= The Buggles discography =

- Studio albums: 2
- Compilation albums: 1
- Singles: 9
- Video albums: 1
- Music videos: 3
- Promotional extended plays: 1
- Production: 3

The Buggles, a duo consisting of bassist Trevor Horn and keyboardist Geoff Downes, have a discography of two studio albums, a compilation album and video live album, a promotional extended play, nine singles, and three music videos. The Buggles also produced three songs, "Back of My Hand" by The Jags, "Monkey Chop" by Dan-I, and "Film Star" by Tom Marshall. The group formed in 1977 in Wimbledon, South West London, and were signed by Island Records to record and publish their debut studio album, The Age of Plastic, which was released in 1980. The album charted in the UK, Canada, the Netherlands, France, Sweden, and Japan.

The lead single for The Age of Plastic was "Video Killed the Radio Star", released in 1979. The song was a huge commercial success, becoming the 444th number one hit on the UK Singles Chart, spending one week at the top. It was also number 1 on fifteen other international record charts and sold more than five million copies worldwide. It received certifications by the Syndicat National de l'Édition Phonographique and British Phonographic Industry of platinum and gold respectively. Its music video was the first to air on MTV. Three other singles from The Age of Plastic, "Living in the Plastic Age", "Clean, Clean" and "Elstree", achieved chart success in the UK, Germany and the Netherlands. Music videos were made for all of the album's songs, with the "Video Killed the Radio Star" video being the first to air on MTV, and the "Living in the Plastic Age" video being the second-to-final video aired that day.

Adventures in Modern Recording, released in 1981, was the second and last album by The Buggles. Five singles from it were released between 1981 and 1982, "I Am a Camera", "Adventures in Modern Recording", "On TV", "Lenny", and "Beatnik". The album and its singles were a commercial failure in the UK, but the album did chart in the United States, peaking at number 161 on the Billboard 200 and at number 7 on the Bubbling Under the Top Rock Albums chart. The album also charted in the Netherlands, as did "I Am a Camera" and "Lenny". "On TV" was certified gold by Music Canada for sales of 5,000 units. Music videos were also made for the album's first three singles. By the end of 1982, the band would break up, although they would reunite multiple times, including in 2010, when they released their sole live album, A Sea of Cameras – Live in New York, 20th September 2010. They would also release a compilation album, The 12" & Rarities Collection, a year later, in 2010.

== Albums ==
=== Studio albums ===
List of studio albums, with details and chart positions
Title	Details	Peak chart positions									
Title	Details	UK	CAN	FRA	ITA	JPN	NLD	NOR	SWE	US	US Rock
The Age of Plastic	Released: 10 January 1980 (Australia); Label: Island; Formats: CD, LP, cassette, digital download	27	83	15	17	35^{[A]}	—	23	24	—	—
Adventures in Modern Recording	Released: November 1981 (UK); Labels: Carrere, Polydor, CBS; Formats: CD, LP, cassette, digital download	—	—	—	—	—	26	—	50	161	57^{[B]}
"—" denotes releases that did not chart or did not have a release in that territory.

=== Compilation ===
List of compilation albums with details
Title	Details
The 12" & Rarities Collection	Released 2011; Format: CD

=== Live video albums ===
List of compilation albums with details
Title	Details
A Sea of Cameras – Live in New York, 20th September 2010	Released 2010; Format: DVDr

== Promotional extended plays ==
List of promotional extended plays with details
Title	Details
Extracts from The Age of Plastic	Released 1979; Labels: Island; Format: Vinyl

== Singles ==
List of singles, with selected chart positions, certifications and sales
Title	Year	Peak chart positions										Certifications	Album
Title	Year	UK	AUS	AUT	GER	ITA	NLD	NZ	SWE	SWI	US	Certifications	Album
"Video Killed the Radio Star"	1979	1	1	1	2	23	16	2	1	1	40	BPI: Platinum; SNEP: Platinum; IFPI Danmark: Gold; FIMI: Gold; RIAJ: Gold; PROMUSICAE: Gold	The Age of Plastic
"Living in the Plastic Age"	1980	16	—	—^{[C]}	29	—	29	—	—	—	—		The Age of Plastic
"Clean Clean"	1980	38	—	—	60	—	—	—	—	—	—		The Age of Plastic
"Elstree"	1980	55	—	—	—	—	—	—	—	—	—		The Age of Plastic
"I Am a Camera"	1981	— ^{[C]}	—	—	—	45	46	—	—	—	—		Adventures in Modern Recording
"Adventures in Modern Recording"	1982	— ^{[D]}	—	—	—	—	—	—	—	—	—		Adventures in Modern Recording
"On TV"	1982	—	—	—	—	—	—	—	—	—	—	MC: Gold	Adventures in Modern Recording
"Lenny"	1982	—	—	—	—	—	17	—	—	—	—		Adventures in Modern Recording
"Beatnik"	1982	—	—	—	—	—	—	—	—	—	—		Adventures in Modern Recording
"—" denotes releases that did not chart or did not have a release in that territory.

== Music videos ==
Song	Year	Director
"Video Killed the Radio Star"	1979	Russell Mulcahy
"Living in the Plastic Age"	1980	Russell Mulcahy
"Clean, Clean"	1980	
"Elstree"	1980	
"I Am a Camera"	1981	
"Adventures in Modern Recording"	1982	
"On TV"	1982	

== Production ==
List of songs produced by The Buggles, with year of release and chart positions
Song and artist	Year	Peak chart positions			
Song and artist	Year	UK	NZ	SWE	US
"Back of My Hand" by The Jags	1979	17	—	—	84
"Monkey Chop" by Dan-I	1979	30	4	11	—
"Film Star" by Tom Marshall	1981	—	—	—	—
"—" denotes releases that did not chart or did not have a release in that territory.

== Notes ==
- A The 2010 Japanese reissue of The Age of Plastic made a minor appearance on the Oricon charts, taking the number 225 spot.
- B Adventures in Modern Recording was not able to chart on the Billboard Top 50 Rock Albums, but did manage to reach number seven on Bubbling Under the Top Rock Albums chart, an extension to the Top Rock Albums.
- C Although never appearing on the proper singles chart, Ö3 Austria Top 40, "Living in the Plastic Age" reached number six on the Ö3-Hitparade.
- D This single did not enter the UK Singles Chart, but did reach number 97 on the Record Business Top 100 Singles chart.
- E This single did not enter the UK Singles Chart, but did reach number 136 on the Record Business Bubbling Under Singles 101–150 chart.
