= I Love You (Miss Robot) =

1980 song by the Buggles

Song by the Buggles

from the album The Age of Plastic
- Released: January 10, 1980
- Recorded: 1979
- Genre: Electropop; new wave
- Length: 4:58
- Label: Island
- Songwriter: The Buggles
- Producer: The Buggles

The Age of Plastic track listing
- 8 tracks: 1. "Living in the Plastic Age"; 2. "Video Killed the Radio Star"; 3. "Kid Dynamo"; 4. "I Love You (Miss Robot)"; 5. "Clean, Clean"; 6. "Elstree"; 7. "Astroboy (And the Proles on Parade)"; 8. "Johnny on the Monorail"

Audio sample
- First verse: file; help

"I Love You (Miss Robot)" is a song written, performed and produced by the Buggles, a duo of Trevor Horn and Geoff Downes, for their debut studio album, The Age of Plastic (1980), released through Island Records. The song was recorded in 1979, and is an electropop and new wave record.

The song is, according to Downes, about "being on the road and making love to someone you don't really like", although music critics consider the song's subject having to do with a robot. The song was performed live in 2010, as part of the first performance of all the tracks from The Age of Plastic.

== Production ==
"I Love You" is the fourth track of The Buggles' debut studio album The Age of Plastic, although it was not released as a single. Plastic was recorded in 1979, and was made on a budget of £60,000. The backing track of "I Love You" was recorded at Virgin's Town House in West London, with mixing and recording of vocals held at Sarm East Studios. Gary Langan mixed the song on a Sunday in 1979, between 11:00 p.m./12:00 a.m. and 3:00/4:00 a.m. Langan has said that the song was "one of the best mixes I've ever done", and considered the song to be a "pukka mix".

== Composition and reception ==
"I Love You" is an electropop and new wave record. When performing "I Love You" at the Ladbroke Grove's Supperclub, a live performance known as "The Lost Gig", Horn said that he conceived the idea of the song after playing Henry Mancini's "Moon River" on a bass guitar every Tuesday night. Alongside Horn, Downes is also a vocalist on the track, which he sings through a vocoder. He said that "I Love You" was really about "being on the road and making love to someone you don't really like, while all the time you're wanting to phone someone who's a long way off."

Despite this, AllMusic, in their review of The Age of Plastic, considered the song to be about "a metaphorical love affair with a robot" that "explores modern man's relationship to, and dependence on, technology", and Craven Lovelace of the Grand Junction Free Press noted the song as an example of the increased popularity of robots as a musical subject in the early 1980s. Theo Cateforis wrote in his book, Are We Not New Wave?: Modern Pop at the Turn of the 1980s, that the title of The Age of Plastic and the songs "I Love You" and "Astroboy" "picture the arrival of the 1980s as a novelty era of playful futurism". Chuck Eddy from Spin viewed the song title as a proof The Age of Plastic was "firmly in Kraftwerk's future-tech tradition".

== Live performances ==
In September 2010, the song was performed live at Ladbroke Grove's Supperclub in Notting Hill, London, billed as "The Lost Gig". This saw the first live performances of all songs from The Age of Plastic.

== Personnel ==
- Geoff Downes – writer, producer, keyboards, drums, percussion, additional vocals
- Trevor Horn – writer, producer, vocals, bass guitar, guitar
