= Adventures in Modern Recording =

Studio album by the Buggles
- Released: November 1981
- Studios: Sarm East, London
- Genre: Progressive electronic
- Length: 34:29
- Labels: Carrere; CBS
- Producers: Trevor Horn; Geoff Downes; John Sinclair

The Buggles chronology
The Age of Plastic (1979)	Adventures in Modern Recording (1981)

Singles from Adventures in Modern Recording
- 1. "I Am a Camera" Released: 2 October 1981; 2. "Adventures in Modern Recording" Released: 8 January 1982; 3. "Lenny" Released: March 1982 (EU); 4. "On TV" Released: 9 April 1982 (UK); 5. "Beatnik" Released: 7 October 1982 (France)

Adventures in Modern Recording is the second and final studio album by the English new wave group the Buggles, released in November 1981 by Carrere Records. Although the Buggles began as a duo of Trevor Horn and Geoff Downes, the album ended up as mostly Horn's solo effort, as Downes left to join the English rock band Asia on the day recording was originally scheduled to begin. It contains nine tracks, including a version of a track from the Yes album Drama (1980), recorded during Horn and Downes' short initial tenure with the band. Originally named "Into the Lens", the Buggles rendition is titled "I Am a Camera".

A stylistically and sonically varied progressive electronic album, Adventures in Modern Recording depicts Horn perfecting his skill as producer and was described by journalists as a document for how he would produce his later works. It was one of the earliest albums to use the Fairlight CMI, one of the first digital sampling synthesizers.

Upon its release, Adventures in Modern Recording faced mixed reviews from music critics and performed poorly commercially in the United Kingdom, failing to make it on the UK Albums Chart. The album did well in other territories, such as in North America and mainland Europe, reaching number 161 on the US Billboard 200. Additionally, retrospective reviews praised how comparable in quality its sound was to music released in later years.

Five singles were released from Adventures in Modern Recording: "I Am a Camera", the title track, "On TV", "Lenny", and "Beatnik". Except for "Beatnik", the singles were minor hits in the United Kingdom and the Netherlands, "Lenny" being a top-20 hit in the latter country. Both "We Can Fly from Here" and "Riding a Tide" (appearing as demos on the 2010 reissue) were re-recorded by Yes (with Horn as producer and Downes on keyboards) for their twentieth studio album Fly from Here (2011).

== Background and production ==
On the day studio sessions for Adventures in Modern Recording were to begin, the Buggles' keyboardist Geoff Downes left to form the English rock band Asia. Although Island Records' publisher renegotiated with Downes, his departure gave the publisher a false impression that Buggles singer and bassist Trevor Horn's career ended, resulting in Island dropping the duo; this in turn led to Horn's other industry acquaintances having a similar viewpoint. Horn recalled feeling "astounded" and "fucking angry [...] I hadn't even got started yet..." Shortly afterwards, Horn's wife Jill Sinclair made a deal with French label Carrere Records to fund, promote and release the album.

While Adventures in Modern Recording was mostly a Horn solo project, Downes was still involved in the writing and production of "Vermillion Sands", "I Am a Camera" and "Lenny" (where he also handled the drum programming) and played keyboards on "Beatnik". Other collaboraters included Julian Mendelsohn and Gary Langan as engineers; Anne Dudley, who would later form The Art of Noise with Langan and Horn, as keyboardist on "Beatnik"; Horn's long-time collaborator Luis Jardim as percussion on "Beatnik"; and Yes bassist Chris Squire as providing "sound effects" for the title track. One of the tracks, "I Am a Camera," started as a Buggles demo that turned into a "slightly more overblown" track for their Yes collaboration album Drama (1980), named "Into the Lens"; although Horn appreciated the Yes version's "unadulterated" melody and complex arrangement, he liked the Buggles' recording more.

== Concept and sound ==
"Vermillion Sands"
Adventure in Modern Recording is a sonically and stylistically diverse album, as illustrated by "Vermillion Sands" alone; this part quickly goes from an upbeat jazz song to a dramatic piece of music.

A more left-field record than the Buggles' previous album The Age of Plastic (1980) as Horn planned it to be, Adventures in Modern Recording is a progressive electronic album containing both dance cuts and big-sounding tracks. It is stylistically and sonically diverse, as heard in "Vermillion Sands" alone; compared by Chris Roberts of BBC Music to Queen's "Bohemian Rhapsody", the song consists of "electro-pop, harmony vocals, key signature changes, incongruous blasts of synthetic trumpet and boogie woogie piano and swing", described Mojo's David Buckley. The title track mashes together electronic and acoustically made instruments, as well as dreamy and "hyper-alert" vibes, analyzed Joe Stannard of The Quietus.

The Buggles line-up for Adventures in Modern Recording: Horn (third from the left) in a tuxedo surrounded by similarly dressed dummies.

During the recording of the album, Horn also produced for the pop act Dollar; this influenced how he created Adventures in Modern Recording and in turn his works for Dollar. He envisioned the duo as a "technopop orchestra" playing at the Vermillion Sands hotel (the subject of one of the album's tracks). This not only gave Horn the idea of songwriting and production concepts for Adventures in Modern Recording, but also how the Buggles' visual aesthetic would change; the group went from two human players to a four-piece led by Horn and backed by three male dummies a la the Autons and members of Kraftwerk.

Horn described producing Adventures in Modern Recording as a training of his production craft with experimentations of gear. Retrospective pieces have labeled it a document of how he would produce his later works. The album was one of the first commercially available albums to feature sounds from the Fairlight CMI, one of the first digital sampling synthesizers, and was one of Horn's earliest times working with sampling techniques he'd later incorporate into his works for Grace Jones, Art of Noise and Frankie Goes To Hollywood.

== Release and promotion ==
Initially, Carerre only planned three single releases of Adventures in Modern Recording tracks: "I Am a Camera" with a B-side of "Fade Away" in October 1981, the title track with "Blue Nylon" as its B-side in January 1982 and "On TV" with a longer version of "Blue Nylon" later that year. However, the album's success in continental Europe led to the label releasing both "Lenny" and "Beatnik" as singles in 1982. "On TV" and "Fade Away" garnered an exclusive flexidisc release via Trouser Press magazine, while the title track ran on the seventh issue of SFX Cassette Magazine, where guest critic Richard Skinner applauded Horn's singing and compared it to the works of Crosby, Stills, Nash & Young.

In February 2010, Salvo and ZTT Records reissued the album on CD. This edition included the original album alongside a selection of bonus tracks, including B‑sides and several previously unreleased demos such as "We Can Fly from Here," "Dion," "Videotheque," "On TV," "Walking on Glass" (an early version of "Lenny"), and "Riding a Tide." Some reviewers criticized the reissue for being mastered from lossy digital sources, rather than the original tapes.

== Critical reception ==
Reviews of Adventures in Modern Recording upon release were mixed. Tim de Lisle of Smash Hits praised Horn's production and the first five tracks for having "enough strong tunes, witty ideas and funky noises", but generally found the album "much less than the sum of the parts, and Side Two deteriorates into tedious Yes-style pomposity". A reviewer from The Morning Call also made an unflattering Yes comparison towards some of the songs, like "Beatnik"; he wrote that while it has the "melancholic frenzy" of the duo's biggest hit "Video Killed The Radio Star", it also has the same Yes-style mixture of "pretentious, meaningless lyrics" and "soaring, grandiose harmonics". Opined Mike Gardner in Record Mirror, "Instead of an invigorating glimpse into their world of hi-sci techno wizardry, we get a weedy piece of whimsy."

A Record Mirror review by Sunie Fletcher of the title track negatively compared it to the "yukky strain of studiedly bouncy, vacuous pop" of "Video Killed the Radio Star". Smash Hits published an unfavorable review of "I Am a Camera", written by Fred Dollar. However, it also ran Martin Fry's review for "On TV", which noted its ahead-of-the-curve production, particularly with its huge drum and clear recording quality.

Retrospective reviews were far more enthusiastic, noting how Adventures in Modern Recording's sound was comparable in quality to music released in later years. AllMusic's Jeri Montesan found the sound of it and The Age of Plastic better than the "unimaginative" pop of the 1990s. Roberts, on the other hand, felt that while Horn's project was ambitious, it had some outdated and chintzy-sounding moments. Stannard called its songwriting "vastly more sophisticated and satisfying" than The Age of Plastic, while The Bolton News journalist Martin Hutchinson highlighted Horn's vocals.

== Commercial performance ==
Horn admitted to being uninterested in Adventures in Modern Recording near the end of production "because I didn’t think there was a single there". In his home country of the United Kingdom, the album's economic performance confirmed that doubt, failing to make an impact. It was unable to enter the UK Albums Chart, and the title track and "On TV" were only minor hits on the singles and airplay charts of UK magazine Record Business.

However, Adventures in Modern Recording fared better in North America and continental Europe, particularly France, the Netherlands and the US where it was the Buggles' only entry on the country's official Billboard 200 chart, peaking at number 161. "On TV" was number 31 on Quebec's non-French chart, lasting five weeks on it, and was certified gold by Music Canada for sales of 5,000 units. In the Netherlands, "I Am a Camera" was a minor hit and "Lenny" was in the top 20, particularly reaching number nine in Holland.

This led to Horn lip-syncing "Lenny" on the country's TopPop series (with ABC as the backing band) on an episode aired 10 April 1982. The performance signaled the end of the Buggles project; Horn stated in the interview after the performance that while the Buggles were going downhill, he was more focused on his more successful venture as a producer for other acts.

== Track listing ==
Side one
No.	Title	Writer(s)	Producer(s)	Length
1.	"Adventures in Modern Recording"	Simon Darlow; Trevor Horn; Bruce Woolley	T. Horn; John Sinclair	3:46
2.	"Beatnik"	T. Horn	T. Horn; J. Sinclair	3:38
3.	"Vermillion Sands"	Geoff Downes; T. Horn	T. Horn; G. Downes	6:48
4.	"I Am a Camera"	G. Downes; T. Horn	T. Horn; G. Downes	4:56

Side two
No.	Title	Writer(s)	Producer(s)	Length
5.	"On TV"	T. Horn; B. Woolley; Rodney Thomlpson	T. Horn; J. Sinclair	2:48
6.	"Inner City"	S. Darlow; T. Horn	T. Horn; J. Sinclair	3:22
7.	"Lenny"	G. Downes; T. Horn	T. Horn; G. Downes	3:12
8.	"Rainbow Warrior"	S. Darlow; T. Horn; J. Sinclair	T. Horn; J. Sinclair	5:22
9.	"Adventures in Modern Recording" (reprise)	S. Darlow; T. Horn; B. Woolley	T. Horn; J. Sinclair	0:51
Total length:				34:29

Bonus tracks on the 2011 Vinyl re-release (B-sides)
No.	Title	Writer(s)	Producer(s)	Length
10.	"Fade Away"	T. Horn; J. Sinclair	T. Horn	2:36
11.	"Blue Nylon"	T. Horn; S. Darlow; J. Sinclair	T. Horn	2:25
12.	"I Am a Camera" (12" mix)	T. Horn; G. Downes	T. Horn	4:13
Total length:				43:43

Bonus tracks on the 1997 CD re-release and the 2010 CD re-release (B-sides)
No.	Title	Writer(s)	Producer(s)	Length
10.	"Fade Away"	T. Horn; J. Sinclair	T. Horn	2:36
11.	"Blue Nylon"	T. Horn; S. Darlow; J. Sinclair	T. Horn	2:25
12.	"I Am a Camera" (12" mix)	T. Horn; G. Downes	T. Horn	4:13
Total length:				43:43

Bonus tracks on the 2010 CD re-release (Demos)
No.	Title	Writer(s)	Producer(s)	Length
13.	"We Can Fly from Here – Part 1"	G. Downes; T. Horn	G. Downes; T. Horn	5:09
14.	"Dion"	G. Downes; T. Horn	G. Downes; T. Horn	5:03
15.	"Videotheque"	S. Darlow; T. Horn	T. Horn	3:34
16.	"On TV" (Demo)	B. Woolley; R. Thompson; T. Horn	T. Horn; J. Sinclair	3:52
17.	"Walking on Glass" (Original version of "Lenny")	G. Downes; T. Horn	T. Horn	3:14
18.	"Riding a Tide"	G. Downes; T. Horn	T. Horn	4:50
19.	"We Can Fly from Here – Part 2"	G. Downes; T. Horn	T. Horn	4:02
Total length:				73:27

== Personnel ==
The following is taken from the liner notes of the 2010 re-issue of Adventures in Modern Recording.

The Buggles – producers

- Geoff Downes – keyboards (2–4, 7), drum programming (7), production (3–4, 7, 12)
- Trevor Horn – vocals, bass (1, 6, 9–11), guitar (2–4, 7), drum programming (4), production

Production

- John Sinclair – drum programming (1, 5–6, 8–11), cymbals (1, 8–9), guitar (2), vocals (5), production (1–2, 5–6, 8–9, 16)
- Simon Darlow – keyboards and guitar (1, 5–6, 8–11)
- Chris Squire – sound effects (1, 9)
- Anne Dudley – keyboards (2)
- Luís Jardim – percussion (2)
- Bruce Woolley – vocals (5)
- Danny Schogger, Rod Thompson – keyboards (7)
- Gary Langan, Julian Mendelsohn – engineering
- Stuart Bruce – assistant engineering
- Rory Kee – illustrator
- Glenn Travis Associates – design

== Charts ==
Weekly chart performance for Adventures in Modern Recording
Chart (1982)	Peak position
Dutch Albums (Album Top 100)	26
Swedish Albums (Sverigetopplistan)	50
US Billboard 200	161
US Top Adds Rock Albums (Billboard)	7
