= English Garden (album) =

Studio album by Bruce Woolley and the Camera Club
- Released: November 1979
- Recorded: Eden Studios, London
- Genre: Post-punk; new wave; power pop; hard rock
- Length: 39:15; 57:04 (reissue)
- Label: Epic; Columbia
- Producer: Mike Hurst, Bruce Woolley, Thomas Dolby

Alternate covers
- 2009 reissue using North American cover art

Singles from English Garden
- 1. "Video Killed the Radio Star" Released: June 1979 (EU); 2. "Dancing with the Sporting Boys" Released: September 1979; 3. "Clean, Clean" Released: November 1979; 4. "English Garden" Released: March 1980 (US)

English Garden, released in North America as Bruce Woolley and the Camera Club, is a studio album by Bruce Woolley and his new wave band the Camera Club. The band consisted of Woolley on vocals, Matthew Seligman on bass, Rod Johnson on drums, Dave Birch on guitar, and Thomas Dolby on keyboards. Before forming the group, Woolley was creating pop songs intended for publishing companies, but he was not happy with what the artists were doing with his songs and decided to write material for himself.

Recorded at Eden Studios in London, English Garden was released in most territories by Epic Records, while in North America the album was distributed by CBS Records. Singles from English Garden included the title track, "Video Killed the Radio Star", "Clean, Clean" and "Dancing with the Sporting Boys". Most reviews of English Garden were very positive, one reviewer even calling it ahead of other releases in its genre. "Video Killed the Radio Star" and "Clean, Clean" would later be recorded and popularized by The Buggles, which Woolley was a founding member of.

== Background ==
Bruce Woolley started writing and recording pop songs at home with Revox equipment during his school years: "I was playing guitar but floundering about without direction." This made him start making songs specifically for music publishing companies, and he was eventually hired by someone to do so. He had spent eighteen months writing compositions for other artists, but did not appreciate what they were doing with his songs. He decided to quit this position and write songs for himself, meeting producer Mike Hurst and his manager Chris Bough, who was also well known for being manager for singer-songwriter Cat Stevens. Thus, Woolley financed to form his band which he called the Camera Club, which, in addition to him being the vocalist, had Matthew Seligman on bass, Rod Johnson on drums, Dave Birch on guitar, and Thomas Dolby on keyboards. Recorded in Eden Studios in London, English Garden was engineered by Richard Goldblatt with assistance from Nick T. Froom.

Meanwhile, Woolley had also formed a group with Trevor Horn and Geoff Downes called the Buggles in 1977, recording demos of tracks such as "Clean, Clean" and "Video Killed the Radio Star". Woolley had left the group to form the Camera Club by the time the Buggles were signed to Island Records in 1979, and the band recorded both songs for English Garden. Many writers called Woolley's recording of "Video" much better than the Buggles' version. This included one critic who called both acts overall as of being very high quality, but felt that Woolley's version was more faithful to the source material than that of the Buggles, noting the filtered vocals and cute, female vocals of the latter rendition as giving it a novelty feel. However, he also wrote of liking both versions of "Clean, Clean" on the same level.

== Composition ==
While also categorized by one writer to be a light power pop record in the vein of acts like the Move, as well as a pop rock release by another, English Garden is a new wave record taking influence of works from David Bowie and Brian Eno, like the majority of artists in the style that existed around the release of the album. However, unlike other new wave releases that only increased their hopelessness of Bowie's and Eno's songs, English Garden's honest, humorous lyrics, which deal with a male remembering about his currently failing marriage thanks to "automation and his modern surroundings" as one journalist analyzed, show that the narrator is struggling, but is optimistic that his relationship will improve.

== Release ==
In North America, the group was signed by Columbia Records after just five weeks of rehearsal, and the [self-titled] album was released in the continent with cover art designed by Janet Perr. Bruce Woolley & the Camera Club was promoted in the United States with a tour just before its release in the country, and songs from the album also garnered radio play in the States. The album peaked at number 184 on the Billboard 200 chart. There were also several performances in Woolley's home country promoting English Garden. However, despite this and the record's critical acclaim, the release quickly faded into obscurity; a writer for Trouser Press analyzed that this was to be expected given that the LP only presented Woolley's devotion to music from the 1960s, but also said that the group might've been famous in some sort of way thanks to Dolby's involvement in the band.

== Critical reception ==
English Garden garnered mostly rave reviews upon its release. The Age's John Teerds spotlighted the album's "inventive" songwriting, strong vocal performance, and "appealing" melodies, but also noted that it may take two or three hearings of the record for the listener to enjoy it. Ted Burley of Montreal Gazette honored the quality of the release as above other new wave acts at the time and wrote that it should've set the decade's norm for the genre. He wrote that Woolley was "attacking the eighties rather than surrendering to them", being able to make the production fresh and the vocals futuristic while making it sound human and non-robotic. Among the "lush" harmonies and "tasteful" arrangements, the unique, non-permissive lyrical content was also a significant highlight in his review, praising its "slice-of-life realism and scope." A more mixed review called the album "one of those weird pop albums that England seems to spew out yearly" and "sort of 10cc for nostalgists".

== Track listing ==
All songs written and composed by Bruce Woolley and produced by Mike Hurst. Additional writing credits are noted.

Side 1
No.	Title	Length
1.	"English Garden"	3:00
2.	"Video Killed the Radio Star" (Trevor Horn, Geoff Downes)	2:49
3.	"Dancing with the Sporting Boys"	3:32
4.	"Johnny" (Horn)	3:03
5.	"No Surrender"	2:50
6.	"Flying Man"	2:50

Side 2
No.	Title	Length
7.	"You Got Class" (Stuart Gent)	2:10
8.	"W. W. 9. Instrumental" (Thomas Dolby)	0:49
9.	"Clean, Clean" (Horn, Downes)	5:23
10.	"Get Away William" (Dave Birch)	3:19
11.	"Goodbye to Yesterday"	3:33
12.	"Goodbye to Yesterday (reprise)" (Birch, Dolby, Matthew Seligman, Rod Johnson)	2:22
13.	"You're the Circus (I'm the Clown)" (Graham Adcock)	3:35
Total length:		39:15

2009 reissue bonus tracks
No.	Title	Length
14.	"Bobby Bad"	2:38
15.	"Blue Blue (Victoria)"	3:41
16.	"1000 Mph" (Guy Woolley)	3:35
17.	"Ghost Train" (Thomas Dolby)	3:51
18.	"House of Wax"	4:04
Total length:		57:04

== Singles ==
Song	Region	Date(s)	Format	Label
"English Garden" / "Video Killed the Radio Star"	North America	1979	7"	Columbia Records
"Video Killed the Radio Star" / "Get Away William"	Europe	1979	7"	Epic Records
"Clean, Clean" / "Flying Man"	Europe	1979	7"	Epic Records
"Clean Clean" / "Video Killed the Radio Star"	Japan	1979	7"	Epic Records
"Dancing with the Sporting Boys" / "Flying Man"	United Kingdom	14 September 1979	7"	Epic Records
