= The Age of Plastic =

Studio album by The Buggles
- Released: 10 January 1980 (Aus.); 8 February 1980 (UK)
- Recorded: 1979
- Studios: Virgin's Town House (West London); Sarm East (London); Brick Lane
- Genres: Progressive pop; new wave; electropop
- Length: 36:24
- Label: Island
- Producer: The Buggles

The Buggles chronology
The Age of Plastic (1980)	Adventures in Modern Recording (1981)

Singles from The Age of Plastic
- 1. "Video Killed the Radio Star" Released: 7 September 1979; 2. "The Plastic Age" Released: 18 January 1980; 3. "Clean, Clean" Released: 24 March 1980; 4. "Elstree" Released: 27 October 1980

The Age of Plastic is the debut album by the English new wave duo the Buggles, first released on 10 January 1980 on Island Records. It is a concept album about the possible repercussions of modern technology. The title was conceived from the group's intention of being a "plastic group" and the album was produced in the wake of the success of their debut record, "Video Killed the Radio Star" (1979), which topped the UK Singles Chart. Most of the album's other tracks were written during promotion of the single.

The album was recorded on a budget of £60,000. Bassist Trevor Horn was chiefly inspired by Kraftwerk's 1978 album The Man-Machine and sought unconventional recording methods for The Age of Plastic. Keyboardist Geoff Downes characterised the album as "science fiction music ... like modern psychedelic music ... very futuristic." Several tracks also featured contributions from vocalist Bruce Woolley, who left the group mid-production. The backing tracks were recorded at Virgin's Town House in West London, while the vocals were recorded, and all mixing took place, at Sarm East Studios. Mixing was completed before Christmas 1979.

The Age of Plastic reached number 27 on the UK Albums Chart amid a mixed critical reception. Its three subsequent singles, "The Plastic Age", "Clean, Clean" and "Elstree", charted in the UK, reaching number 16, 38 and 55 respectively. Classic Pop magazine called it the 99th best album of the 1980s, Paste magazine the 45th-best new wave album of all-time. A September 2010 performance at the Ladbroke Grove's Supperclub in Notting Hill, London marked the first time that the group performed the album in its entirety.

== Background ==
Geoff Downes formed the Buggles in 1977 in Wimbledon, South West London with Trevor Horn and Bruce Woolley. The trio had recorded rough demos of early compositions such as "Video Killed the Radio Star", "Clean, Clean" and "On TV", a track later included on their second album, Adventures in Modern Recording. Talking about the formation of the Buggles, Downes said about the demos:

We’d sort out the songs at my place and do all the arrangements together. Later we’d kick the artist out of the studio and spent most of the studio time just doing different things of our own, using every moment to our best advantage. It was a big experience for both of us and after a couple of years of doing that, we had quite a few songs together... It was at that stage that we decided to become artists. We felt that it was about time that somebody started making good, well-produced pop records again. We wanted to give people something more than they already had.

"Video Killed the Radio Star"
Excerpt from the song.

The Buggles were signed to Island Records, who gave Horn and Downes recording and publishing contracts. The group started recording their first studio album in the first half of 1979. Although Woolley was originally intended to be the band's lead vocalist, he left the group during the sessions to form his own band, the Camera Club, who also recorded versions of "Clean, Clean" and "Video Killed the Radio Star", songs that appeared on their 1979 album English Garden. When "Video Killed the Radio Star" became a huge commercial success, Horn and Downes realized that they needed to record more material to fill out a full album, so they wrote additional songs, during the promotion of the single, while in airport lounges, dressing rooms, rehearsal rooms and studios.

== Production and recording ==
The Age of Plastic was afforded a budget of £60,000 (equivalent to £300,000 in 2025). Engineer Hugh Padgham recorded the backing tracks at Virgin's Town House in West London, as Sarm East Studios was very small and Horn wanted to record real drums. The Buggles went to London's Wardour Street to recruit two women to appear on the album. The mixing and Horn's vocal recording were later performed at Sarm East Studios, and mixing was finished before Christmas 1979 for a 1980 album release. Sarm East mixer Gary Langan used a 40-input Trident TSM console to record and mix the album, which was housed inside the same control room as were two Studer A80 24-track machines and outboard gear that included an EMT 140 echo plate, Eventide digital delay, Eventide phaser, Marshall Time Modulator, Kepex noise gates, Urei and Orban equalizers, and Urei 1176, Dbx 160 and UA LA2 and LA3 compressors.

Vocals were recorded at Sarm East to a click track using a Roland TR-808 drum machine and other various machines and boxes that were synced to the tracks. As Langan recalls: "In those days of relatively limited technology we again had to push what we had to the limit... If, for instance, something required an effect, whether it be tape delay or phasing or some big, delayed reverb, the art was to get that effect right and record it... It all had to be done and then, as I said, it would influence the next process." Langan has noted that balancing the backing vocals in the songs was an issue because of the limited storage capacities of the time: "We'd make it as clean as we possibly could, bounce that down to two tracks and then we'd erase."

== Style and composition ==
I don’t have a great feel or a great blues voice. Then I heard Kraftwerk's The Man-Machine and I thought, that’s it! A mechanised rhythm section, a band where you’re never old-fashioned, where you don’t have to emote. It sounded so new and exciting, so full of potential.

— Trevor Horn

Unable to make the album sound similar to others of the late 1970s, Horn "figured that if I couldn't get records to sound like Elton John, which I couldn't because I couldn't figure out how they did it, then whatever I could do, I'd better exaggerate it." He had also wanted to "perverse things with sound, except that in 1978 and 1979, none of the equipment which would later allow me to do that was available. So I had to pre-date that technology by finding my own ways of achieving certain sounds." Audio noted that the album's sound was reminiscent of duo Godley & Creme's debut album Consequences.

Some music reviewers have labeled The Age of Plastic as the first landmark of another electropop era. In his book Are We Not New Wave?: Modern Pop at the Turn of the 1980s, Theo Cateforis writes that the album's title and the songs "I Love You (Miss Robot)" and "Astroboy" "picture the arrival of the 1980s as a novelty era of playful futurism." In a 1979 interview, Downes defined the album as "science fiction music. It's like modern psychedelic music. It's very futuristic." Multiple music journalists have described it as a mixture of synthpop and new wave music, with elements of disco, punk, progressive rock and pop music from the 1960s. The album was also influenced by groups such as 10cc, ELO and Kraftwerk.

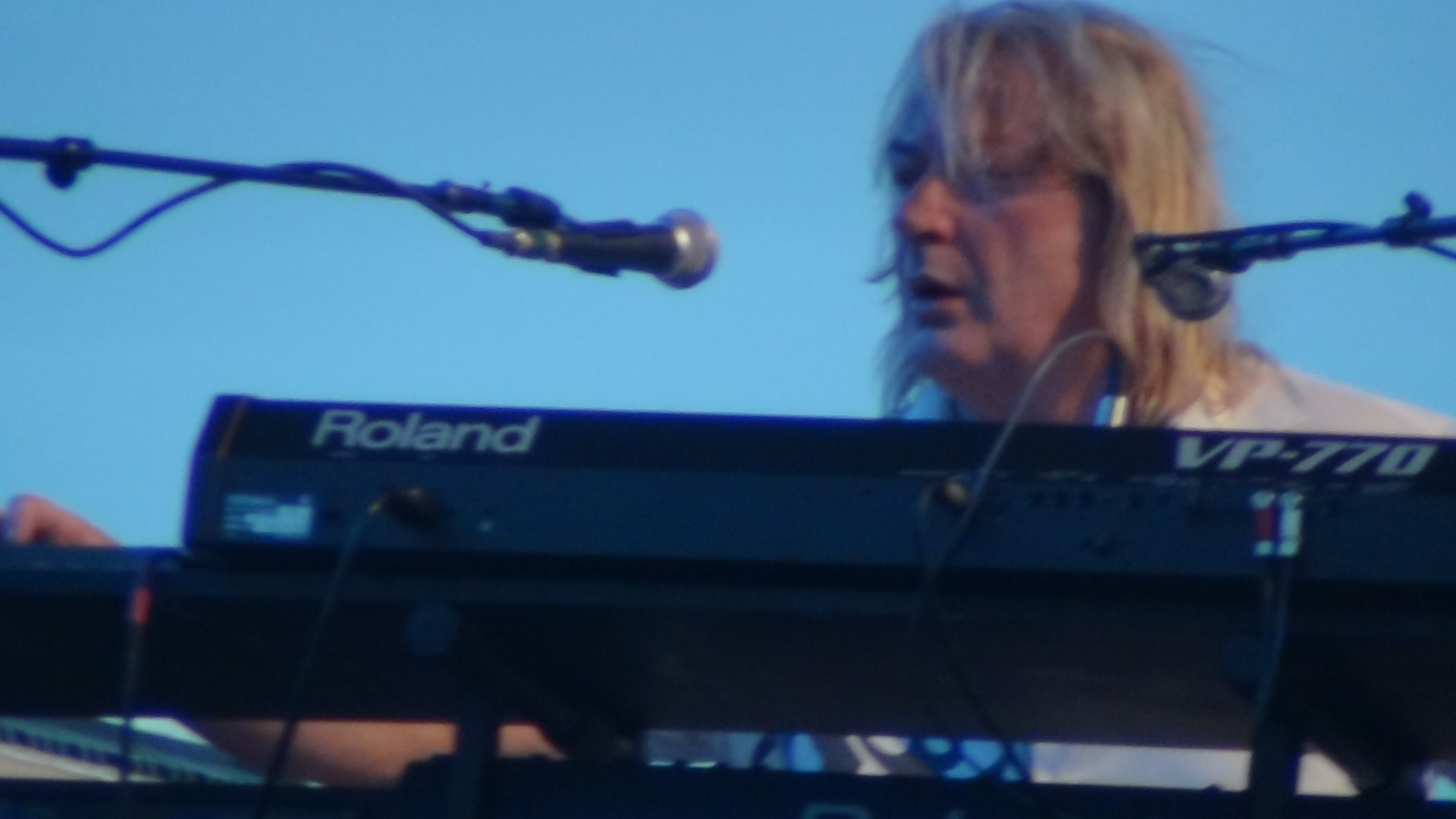
Geoff Downes performing in 2012

Downes and Krinein Magazine noted the tracks' instrumentations of guitars, bass guitar, drums, vocoded, robotic and female vocals, and synthesizers used to emulate orchestral instruments, and well as compositional elements of a variety of complex builds. Downes has said that he used five synthesizers in making The Age of Plastic, which were used to "fake up things and to provide effects we won't use them in the manner that somebody like John Foxx does." According to Horn: "We used about three different drummers including one [Richard James Burgess] from Landscape and Johnny Richardson from the Rubettes, who's really good. We also used the occasional session guitarist to play various bits and there were three or four girl singers involved. Apart from that, we did everything ourselves." Downes claimed to have used George Shearing's trick of doubling melody lines in block chords very heavily on some of the songs.

== Themes and lyrics ==
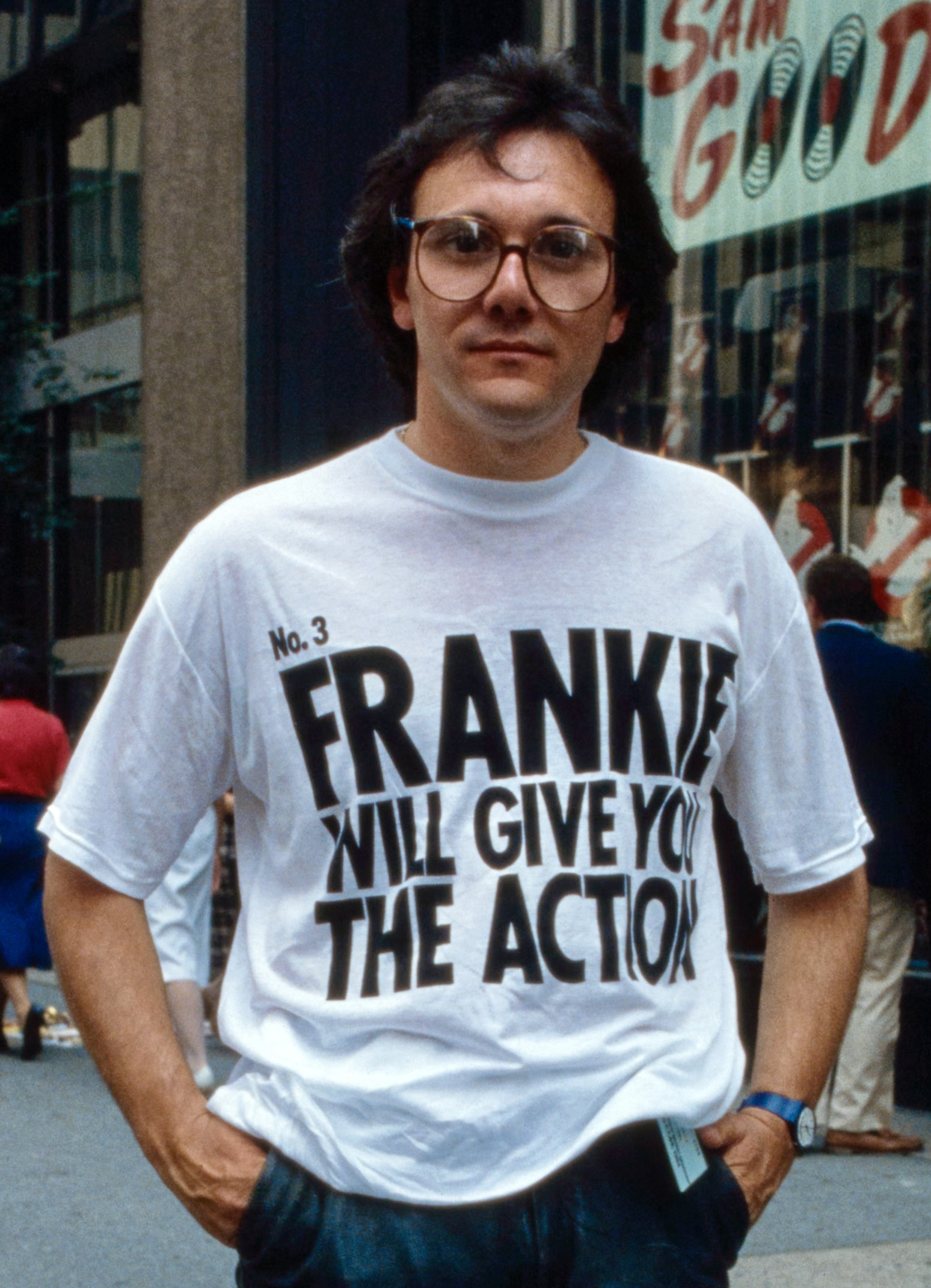
Trevor Horn (pictured 1984) wrote the lyrics to tracks from The Age of Plastic.

The Age of Plastic is a tragicomic concept album with lyrical themes of intense nostalgia and anxiety about the possible effects of modern technology. The lyrics, which were written by Trevor Horn, were inspired by the works of J. G. Ballard. The Buggles have claimed that they were necessarily a "plastic group" to meet the needs of a "plastic age", explaining the album's title, The Age of Plastic. Downes has said that the lyrics were "trying to make cynical comments on a number of issues." Eight tracks are included on The Age of Plastic: "Living in the Plastic Age", "Video Killed the Radio Star", "Kid Dynamo", "I Love You (Miss Robot)", "Clean, Clean", "Elstree", "Astroboy (And the Proles on Parade)" and "Johnny (on the Monorail)". The album's lyrical concept was compared by Orange Coast magazine to that of the works of Canadian progressive rock band Klaatu.

"Video Killed the Radio Star," the second track, refers to a period of technological change in the 1960s, the desire to remember the past and the disappointment that children of the current generation would not appreciate the past. The fast-paced third song, "Kid Dynamo," is about the effects of media on a futuristic kid of the 1980s. On the surface, the lyrics of fourth track, "I Love You (Miss Robot)", describe having sex with a robot prostitute; Downes has said it is about "being on the road and making love to someone you don't really like, while all the time you're wanting to phone someone who's a long way off." Wave Maker magazine viewed the song as "a darkly soothing, bass guitar-driven ballad which brings us back into cyberpunk country."

"Clean, Clean", the album's fifth track, juxtaposes the idea of "fighting clean" with the chaos and absurdity of war; one reviewer suggested it was about a young gang member growing disillusioned with violence. Wave Maker found "Elstree," the album's sixth song, lyrically similar to "Video Killed the Radio Star," as it follows "a failed actor taking up a more regular position behind the scenes and looking back at his life in regret." The slow-tempo ballad "Astroboy (And the Proles on Parade)", according to Wave Maker, "once again revisits cyberpunk with a much lighter vibe, although the keyboards do occasionally border darker realms, expecially [sic] with the post-chorus hook," and the album closer "Johnny on the Monorail" has a "pop atmosphere" that "better suits the flow of the rest of the album."

== Release and reception ==
Contemporary professional ratings
Review scores
Source	Rating
Audio	B+
Melody Maker	4.5/5 stars
Record Mirror	3/5 stars
The Rolling Stone Record Guide	2/5 stars
Smash Hits	8/10
Sounds	2/4 stars

The Age of Plastic was first released in Australia on 10 January 1980, and in the United Kingdom on 8 February the same year. Initially, songs from The Age of Plastic were played on English radio stations from 31 December 1979, and two advertisements for the album were also released. On 1 February 1980, Hans Zimmer filed an injunction to the High Court of Justice threatening to take the album off store shelves for not being credited, but it was rejected; Zimmer didn't play any instrument and only programmed the sequencer and a few Prophet V sounds. The Age of Plastic appeared on the UK Albums Chart for six weeks, reaching number 27 on the chart. The album debuted at number 32 in Norway, eventually reaching number 23, and peaked at number 24 in Sweden. It also reached the number 15 spot on the French Albums Chart and number 35 in Japan.

Lead single "Video Killed the Radio Star", released months earlier, was commercially successful, topping the record charts in 16 countries, including the UK Singles Chart. From January to October 1980, three more singles were issued in support of the album: "Living in the Plastic Age", "Clean, Clean" and "Elstree". All of the singles had chart success in the UK, with "The Plastic Age" and "Clean, Clean" gaining chart success on an international level.

A Trouser Press writer recalled that "The Age of Plastic was a disappointment to fans of the Buggles' cogent 45s ... technically stunning, reasonably catchy and crashingly hollow." Upon release, Betty Page from Sounds commented that the group "stretches uncomfortably out into the long playing medium like a skein of well-chewed bubblegum." Dave Marsh and John Swenson, writing for The Rolling Stone Record Guide (1983), opined that "aside from the wonderful 'Video Killed the Radio Star' — perhaps the most successful recent example of a single where the production was catchier than the material", the album was "high-tech dreck." Conversely, Melody Maker noted that the album is "all jerky twitchings and absurdly inflated post-punk melodrama" and named it as "essential." The Canberra Times's Keith Gosman found the production excellent and said the album sounded "crisp as fresh dollar bills." Smash Hits rated the album 8 out of 10 and called the "electronic and futuristic flavouring" of the album "quite human and therefore the most enjoyable of the lot.", including "lots of energy, well constructed, imaginative and above all a set of GREAT TUNES throughout".

=== Retrospective reviews ===
Retrospective professional ratings
Review scores
Source	Rating
AllMusic	4.5/5 stars
MusicHound Rock	2/5 stars
Krinein Magazine	8/10
Virgin Encyclopedia of Popular Music	2/5 stars

Among retrospective reviews, Jeri Montesano from AllMusic described it as "a fun record that doesn't need to be taken too seriously" and that "it would be difficult to find a record from this era that sounds half as good. Pop rarely reaches these heights." While reviewing the Buggles' second album, Montesano stated that both albums "still sound fresh" compared to 1990s pop music. Amazon editorial reviewer Grant Alden also compared the album to 1990s pop, and labelled the group as "Part of the early-1980s great explosion of pop music [...] to have any real impact."

The Encyclopedia of Science Fiction described the LP as "one of the best examples of the decade's characteristically disposable pop", while Spin named it one of the "8 Essentials of Post-Kraftwerk Pop." Napster's Nicholas Baker liked the album's composition and concluded that "this LP is not so much a guilty pleasure as an essential point in electropop history." Metro Pulse's Anthony Nownes found the tunes "punchy, memorable" and "accessible", concluding his review with "If all rock records sounded like this—shiny and slick and highly processed—the world would be terrible. But a few Trevor Horns—people who use studio technology the way a curious and playful child uses a room full of fictile toys—are nice to have around."

Less favourably, Joseph Stannard opined that The Age of Plastic "sounds like unfinished business, a series of good ideas in need of elaboration." In a review of the album's 1999 reissue, Richard Wallace of the Daily Mirror wrote that the record "shows how [The Buggles] pioneered the synth-led nonsense which fused much of the decade's pop, but had little creative imagination. That bombastic electro-sound became [Trevor] Horn's trademark as a producer. Skip it." Alexis Petridis of The Guardian called it "awful beyond measure", pointing to the liner notes conceding that "we did not have an album's worth of material" and called reissuing it "wasteful, it's stupid."

== Legacy and influence ==
Popular French bands such as Justice, Daft Punk and Phoenix have been influenced by The Age of Plastic. Justice has said that they were "totally fascinated by The Buggles' first album [The Age of Plastic]. It's full of stuff we like - there's a bit of electro, a bit of pop, a bit of classical going on there... We like the way they operated too, as an autonomous duo..."

In 2000, as part of the Island Remasters series, the album was reissued with three bonus tracks, "Technopop", "Island" and "Johnny on the Monorail (A Very Different Version)". The album was remastered and re-released again on 24 February 2010 in Japan. The new edition included nine additional tracks, three of which were from the 2000 re-release album. A single and special DJ version of "Elstree" also appeared on the 2010 reissue of the album, as well as a 12" version of "Clean, Clean". The album's 2010 reissue briefly appeared at number 225 in Japan.

On 28 September 2010, the Buggles reunited to play their first full-length live performance of the album. The event was billed as "The Lost Gig" and took place at Ladbroke Grove's Supperclub in Notting Hill, London. It was a fundraiser with all earnings going to the Royal Hospital for Neuro-disability. With the exception of "Video Killed the Radio Star" and "The Plastic Age", which the band had previously played together, "The Lost Gig" saw the first live performances of all of the remaining songs from The Age of Plastic.

== Track listing ==
All songs written by Trevor Horn and Geoff Downes, except where noted. Source for section names and lengths of "Video Killed the Radio Star":

Side one
No.	Title	Writer(s)	Length
1.	"Living in the Plastic Age"		5:13
2.	"Video Killed the Radio Star" (3:27) Contains "Polythene Symphonia" (0:52)	Horn; Downes; Bruce Woolley	4:13
3.	"Kid Dynamo"		3:29
4.	"I Love You (Miss Robot)"		4:58

Side two
No.	Title	Writer(s)	Length
1.	"Clean, Clean"	Horn; Downes; Woolley	3:53
2.	"Elstree"	Horn; Downes; Woolley	4:29
3.	"Astroboy (And the Proles on Parade)"		4:41
4.	"Johnny on the Monorail"		5:28
Total length:			36:24

Bonus tracks on 2000 CD reissue
No.	Title	Length
9.	"Island" (edit)	3:33
10.	"Technopop"	3:50
11.	"Johnny on the Monorail" (a very different version)	3:49

Bonus tracks on 2010 Japanese CD reissue
No.	Title	Length
9.	"Video Killed the Radio Star" (single version)	3:25
10.	"Kid Dynamo" (single version)	3:29
11.	"Living in the Plastic Age" (single version)	3:51
12.	"Island" (edit version)	3:33
13.	"Clean Clean" (12-inch version)	5:15
14.	"Technopop"	3:50
15.	"Elstree" (single version)	4:06
16.	"Johnny on the Monorail" (a very different version)	3:50
17.	"Elstree" (Special DJ edit version)	3:36

== Personnel ==
Credits are adapted from the album's liner notes.

The Buggles – producers

- Geoff Downes – keyboards, synthesizers, drums, percussion, vocoder
- Trevor Horn – vocals, bass guitar, guitars

=== Additional musicians ===
- Dave Birch – guitars on "The Plastic Age" and "Video Killed the Radio Star"
- Richard James Burgess – drums
- Tina Charles – background vocals
- Debi Doss and Linda Jardim – background vocals on "Video Killed the Radio Star"
- Phil Towner – drums on "Video Killed the Radio Star"
- Paul Robinson – drums
- Bruce Woolley – guitar

=== Technical personnel ===
- Gary Langan – mixer, vocal recording
- Bob Ludwig – mastering
- Hugh Padgham – engineer, instrumental recording

== Charts ==
Weekly chart performance for The Age of Plastic
Year	Chart	Peak position
1980	Australian Albums (Kent Music Report)	49
1980	Canadian Albums (RPM)	83
1980	French Albums (IFOP)	15
1980	Italian Albums (Musica e Dischi)	17
1980	Japanese Albums (Oricon)	35
1980	Norwegian Albums (VG-lista)	23
1980	Spanish Albums (AFE)	4
1980	Swedish Albums (Sverigetopplistan)	24
1980	UK Albums (Official Charts)	27
2010	Japanese Albums (Oricon)	225

Annual chart rankings for The Age of Plastic
Chart (1980)	Rank
Italian Albums (Musica e dischi)	64
