= Into the Lens =

1980 song by Yes

Single by Yes

from the album Drama
- B-side: "Does It Really Happen?"
- Released: September 1980
- Genre: Progressive rock; progressive pop
- Length: 8:33; 3:47 (single)
- Label: Atlantic
- Songwriters: Geoff Downes; Trevor Horn; Steve Howe; Chris Squire; Alan White
- Producers: Yes; Eddy Offord

Yes singles chronology
"Don't Kill the Whale" (1978)	"Into the Lens" (1980)	"Owner of a Lonely Heart" (1983)

Music video
- "Into the Lens" on YouTube

"Into the Lens" is a song written by Trevor Horn and Geoff Downes. It was originally released by progressive rock band Yes, of which Horn and Downes were a part, as a part of their tenth studio album, Drama (1980), through Atlantic Records, before being reworked as "I Am a Camera" for The Buggles, a duo consisting of Horn and Downes, specifically with their second studio album, Adventures in Modern Recording (1981), released through Carrere Records and ZTT Records. Both versions were released as singles, with the Yes single being re-titled "Into the Lens (I Am a Camera)".

The Yes version of the song additionally credits Yes members Steve Howe, Chris Squire, and Alan White as co-songwriters; all of the songs on Drama were credited to the entire band. Upon its release, both versions were positively received by music critics. Commercially, Yes' version charted at number 104 on the US Billboard Hot 100 and peaked within the top 10 of the US Bubbling Under Hot 100, while the Buggles' version charted in both the United Kingdom and the Netherlands. A music video was made of the latter version, and was named a "Classic Video" by Classic Pop.

== Background and development ==
"I Am a Camera"

Single by the Buggles

from the album Adventures in Modern Recording
- B-side: "Fade Away"
- Released: 2 October 1981
- Length: 4:32
- Label: Carrere; ZTT
- Songwriters: Geoff Downes; Trevor Horn
- Producer: Trevor Horn

The Buggles singles chronology
"Elstree" (1980)	"I Am a Camera" (1981)	"Adventures in Modern Recording" (1982)

The first version of the song was a demo, recorded on a Sunday afternoon, when songwriters Trevor Horn and Geoff Downes started working on the second Buggles album in 1980. When they joined Yes, it gained input from other members Steve Howe, Chris Squire and Alan White, and therefore, "Into the Lens" features a more distinctive progressive rock and progressive pop sound.

When Horn and Downes resumed work on the Buggles album, which would become Adventures in Modern Recording (1981), the song was reworked as "I Am a Camera". Trevor Horn said about the two versions:

The song "I Am a Camera" was a Buggles track and we had adapted it into a Yes track. It became "Into the Lens" and, naturally, slightly more overblown. I don't mind "Into the Lens"—the melody's unadulterated while the arrangement's a lot more complicated—but I still prefer The Buggles version. I think Geoffrey's brilliant on the Buggles version.

== Release ==
Along with the "On TV" and "Lenny" singles, the Buggles' "I Am a Camera" was re-released by ZTT on iTunes in 2012, including three bonus tracks: the aforementioned "12" Mix" of the song, and two demos both titled "We Can Fly from Here" ("Part I" and "Part II" respectively). The latter two songs would, like the "I Am a Camera" demo, be reworked as Yes songs, and would become the basis of Yes' future album, Fly from Here (2011), which would mark the second time that both Horn and Downes would work with Yes, following a departure by Jon Anderson, with Downes returning on keyboards for both the album and the tour, but Horn taking the role as producer and offering some backing vocals, reserving lead vocals for Benoît David. Along with the "12" mix", the B-side, and the two demos, the song also appears on ZTT's 2010 re-release of Adventures in Modern Recording.

Yes' version of the song was also released as a single, although significantly shortened from the original album version. The single was released under the title "Into the Lens (I Am a Camera)".

== Reception ==
Upon its release, Record World called it a "playful pop-rocker" with "sweetly affecting" harmonies and keyboards. Commercially, in the Netherlands, the Buggles' version charted on the Single Top 100 at number 46 and peaked at number 11 on the Dutch Top 40. In the United Kingdom, the single charted at number 97 on Record Business' Top 100 Singles chart. Yes' version charted at number 104 on the Billboard Hot 100, and peaked at number 4 on the Bubbling Under Hot 100 chart, both in the United States.

== Music video ==
In the music video made for "I Am a Camera", during the beginning, there are a pair of Horn's trademark glasses. On one of the lenses is a video and the other is glass. Horn comes out of the video side of the glasses (as illustrated). There are scenes involving Horn singing, broken glasses and opticians' tools. The video is seemingly set in a dollhouse. Towards the end, Horn is seen lying on the floor passed out. On the 22nd of March, 2013, Classic Pop called the music video a "Classic Video".

== Legacy ==
Since 1982, a few bars from the song are used as a jingle of "music premiere" at Polskie Radio Program III (Polish Radio Three) and as a jingle to announce a new song on their chart, Lista Przebojów Programu Trzeciego. In 1985, "I Am a Camera" was covered by Kim Carnes, as a bonus track to her ninth studio album, Barking at Airplanes. In a 2020 interview, Carnes admitted that she was unhappy with her performance of the song.

== Personnel ==
=== "Into the Lens" ===
- Trevor Horn – lead vocals
- Geoff Downes – keyboards, vocoder
- Steve Howe – Fender Console Steel and Telecaster
- Chris Squire – bass, backing vocals
- Alan White – drums, percussion

=== "I Am a Camera" ===
- Geoff Downes – keyboards, vocoder
- Trevor Horn – vocals, guitar, drum programming, production

== Charts ==
Weekly chart performance for "Into the Lens"
Chart (1980)	Peak position
US Billboard Hot 100	104

Weekly chart performance for "I Am a Camera"
Chart (1981–82)	Peak position
France (TMP)	9
Italy (TV Sorrisi e Canzoni)	27
Netherlands (Single Top 100)	46
Netherlands (Tipparade)	11
Portugal (Música & Som)	10
UK Top 100 Singles (Record Business)	97
