= Debi Doss =

American-born photographer and singer

Debi Doss is an American-born photographer and singer.

Doss attended Webster University in Webster Groves, a suburb of St. Louis, Missouri in the United States, where she became interested in photography.

== Career ==
Doss performed as a backing vocalist, touring with The Kinks for over three years. She also recorded backing vocals for their musical concept album Schoolboys in Disgrace and on Pink Floyd singer/songwriter/guitarist David Gilmour's self titled debut solo album, alongside Carlena Williams and Shirlie Roden.

Doss sang on "Video Killed the Radio Star", which reached number one on the UK charts. She was on tour with Hot Chocolate when the song reached number one, and Errol Brown gave her a bottle of champagne, as well as the day off, which allowed her to travel to London to perform on Top of the Pops alongside The Buggles.

Doss joined the girl-band Love Force, produced and managed by Dominic ’Bugatti’ King and Frank Musker. During the 1980s, she began a successful partnership with songwriters/producers Charlie Skarbek and Tim Smit. As a group, the trio were signed to CBS and issued singles as The Rhythm Slaves, "Electricity" in 1981 and Dream Regime. In 1984, Charlie and Tim produced Doss’s solo single "Romantique" issued by Ariola Records, the record received airplay across Europe.

Throughout the 1980s and 1990s, Doss continued to work as a session singer recording demos and backing vocals for artists including Chris De Burgh, Cilla Black, Twiggy, Samantha Fox, Mike Oldfield and Bill Wyman. She also worked for theatre impresario Bill Kenwright, recording demos for potential shows; this included an early demo of the Chess hit "I Know Him So Well". During this period, Doss also performed as lead session singer on a 1987 recording of songs from the Petula Clark / Dee Shipman musical Someone Like You. She performs on the Pet Shop Boys' 2006 album Fundamental and performs lead vocals on the new studio recording of songs from the musical Someone Like You.
