= Clean, Clean =

Song written by Trevor Horn, Geoff Downes and Bruce Woolley

Single by Bruce Woolley and the Camera Club

from the album English Garden
- B-side: "Flying Man"
- Released: 2 November 1979
- Recorded: 1979
- Genre: Post-punk; new wave; power pop; synth-pop
- Length: 3:16
- Label: Epic
- Songwriters: Trevor Horn; Geoff Downes; Bruce Woolley
- Producer: Mike Hurst

"Clean, Clean"

Single by the Buggles

from the album The Age of Plastic
- B-side: "Technopop"
- Released: 24 March 1980
- Recorded: 1979
- Genre: Post-punk; new wave; power pop; synth-pop
- Length: 3:53
- Label: Island
- Songwriters: Trevor Horn; Geoff Downes; Bruce Woolley
- Producer: The Buggles

The Buggles singles chronology
| "Living in the Plastic Age" (1980) | "Clean, Clean" (1980) | "Elstree" (1980) |
- 8 tracks: 1. "Living in the Plastic Age"; 2. "Video Killed the Radio Star"; 3. "Kid Dynamo"; 4. "I Love You (Miss Robot)"; 5. "Clean, Clean"; 6. "Elstree"; 7. "Astroboy (and the Poles On Parade)"; 8. "Johnny (on the Monorail)"

Audio sample
- file; help

Music video
- "Clean, Clean" on YouTube

"Clean, Clean" is a song composed by Trevor Horn, Geoff Downes and Bruce Woolley, with additional composition by Thomas Dolby. It was recorded first by the latter for Woolley's band Bruce Woolley and the Camera Club in 1979, which Dolby was also a part of, and later by the remaining two Buggles for their debut album The Age of Plastic. It was released as the album's third single on 28 November 1979. The Buggles' version charted at number 60 on the GfK Entertainment charts in West Germany, and peaked at number 38 on the UK Singles Chart. Their version was also performed on the British television series' Top of the Pops and Cheggers Plays Pop.

== Background and release ==
Along with "Video Killed the Radio Star", the song was co-written by Bruce Woolley. "Clean, Clean" was first recorded and originally released in 1979 by Bruce Woolley and the Camera Club. It was issued as a single in the Netherlands and Japan on 7" vinyl via Epic Records. It was the only song that the Buggles fully wrote as a trio. "Video Killed the Radio Star" was also issued as a single by Woolley in 1979. Both songs were included on the album English Garden, which was also issued under the title Bruce Woolley and the Camera Club.

The single was released on 7" vinyl via Island Records across Europe, America and New Zealand. In the UK, the single was manufactured and distributed by EMI Records Ltd. The single included the B-side "Technopop" which was written by Downes and Horn. The song was originally exclusive to the single before it appeared as a bonus track on the 2000 remastered re-issue of The Age of Plastic album, amongst other re-issues of the album.

The majority of the releases of the single featured the same track listing, however the main American release of the single featured "Astroboy (And the Proles on Parade)" as the B-side - an album track from The Age of Plastic. Additionally, a promotional version of the single was released in America which featured a stereo and mono version of the song on each side.

In America, the single was also issued on 12" vinyl as a scarce promotional release only. This version featured an extended 12-inch version of the song, whilst the B-side was "Living in the Plastic Age", the duo's previous single release. The release also featured exclusive artwork. The 12-inch version of "Clean, Clean" would later see release as a bonus track on the 2010 Japanese CD re-release of The Age of Plastic.

Following the song's original release, it has appeared on three various artists compilations; the 1980 Warner Bros. Records compilation Troublemakers, the 1994 Oglio Records release Richard Blade's Flashback Favorites, Vol. 3 and the 1995 Polygram compilation Teenage Kicks: 46 Classic Punk & New Wave Tracks.

== Composition and reception ==
The original version of "Clean, Clean" by Bruce Woolley plays at a length of 3 minutes and 16 seconds. The Buggles version of "Clean, Clean" runs for 3 minutes and 51 seconds, and is performed at a tempo of 160 beats per minute. The 12-inch mix of the Buggles version included on the 2010 re-issue of The Age of Plastic plays for 5 minutes and 15 seconds. Lyrically, the song follows a group of soldiers who have already seen their share of the action on their way to their next engagement and war being a dirty business in which it is hard to stay clean. The intro of the Camera Club version was composed by Thomas Dolby, titled 'W.W.9', an ambient synth instrumental inspired by the Bowie-Eno ambient synth era, which appears on their debut and only album 'English Garden'. During the Camera Club's live gigs, Dolby would always play it live just before 'Clean, Clean'.

A mixed review by David Hepworth was published for the single in Smash Hits: "Future Winks" from Cuba (Arlola) is another of those fidgety new records, brimming with cleverness and weighed down with smart-ass humour. The same could also apply to "Clean, Clean" by The Buggles (Island) were it not for the cunningly buried hook line that surfaces after a few plays. These boys are masters of the middle eight. But it's as easy to find records like this obnoxious as it is to say they're catchy."

Jeri Montesano of AllMusic highlighted the song as an album standout by labeling it an AMG Pick Track. A review of the album from Audio magazine, noted "Clean, Clean" to be one of "best moments are those coauthored by Wooley" along with "Video Killed the Radio Star". The song was performed at the Buggles' live performance "The Lost Gig" in London. The Independent's Simon Price, on 3 October 2010, stated that “minor hits such as "Clean Clean" and "Elstree" sound radiantly relevant now." Krinein magazine's writer L. Vincent described the song as "pop-electronic", along with the album track "I Love You Miss Robot" and the single's own B-side "Technopop". Nicholas Baker of Napster spoke of the song in a review of the album, stating that it was one of the songs from the album that Trevor Horn's "considerable songwriting prowess" was "evident" in.

== Music video ==
An official music video was produced for the Buggles version of the song, though it is unclear if it was initially released, as no documentation of it exists online prior to its upload to the Buggles Vevo page on October 19, 2020. The video is relatively simplistic when compared to other videos by the band, cutting between shots of various military vehicles driving around a field, with Trevor and Geoff lip syncing the song in the back of a Jeep, and various shots of Geoff playing the 1977 Taito arcade game Missile-X, with Trevor occasionally sat beside him continuing to lip sync.

== Live performances ==
On the 31st of March, 1980, the Buggles mimed the song on Cheggers Plays Pop. On the 10th of April, 1980, the Buggles appeared on the UK music show Top of the Pops, where they also mimed the song. The band performed the song live on BBC Radio 1 on the 4th of October, 1980.

On the 28th of September, 2010, the Buggles reunited to play their first full-length live concert. The event was billed as "The Lost Gig" and took place at Ladbroke Grove's Supperclub, Notting Hill, London, and was a fund raiser with all earnings going to the Royal Hospital for Neuro-disability. Except "Video Killed the Radio Star" and "The Plastic Age" which the band had previously played together, "The Lost Gig" saw the first live performances of all songs from The Age of Plastic, and included Bruce Woolley performing vocals with Horn on "Clean, Clean".

== Track listing ==
7" single

1. "Clean, Clean" - 3:54
2. "Technopop" - 3:48

7" single (American release)

1. "Clean, Clean" - 3:54
2. "Astroboy (And the Proles on Parade)" - 4:40

7" single (American promo)

1. "Clean, Clean (Stereo)" - 3:54
2. "Clean, Clean (Mono)" - 3:54

12" single (American promo)

1. "Clean, Clean (Extended Version)" - 5:13
2. "Living in the Plastic Age" - 5:09

== Charts ==
| Chart (1980) | Peak position |
|---|---|
| UK Singles (Official Charts Company) | 38 |
| West Germany (GfK) | 60 |

== Personnel ==
- Geoff Downes – keyboards, backing vocals, drums, percussion, producer
- Trevor Horn – vocals, bass guitar, guitar, producer
- Bruce Woolley - vocals, guitar, producer

=== Additional personnel ===
- Thomas Dolby - keyboards, producer
- Paul Robinson - drums
- Richard James Burgess – drums
- John Sinclair - mixing
