= The Buggles =

English new wave band

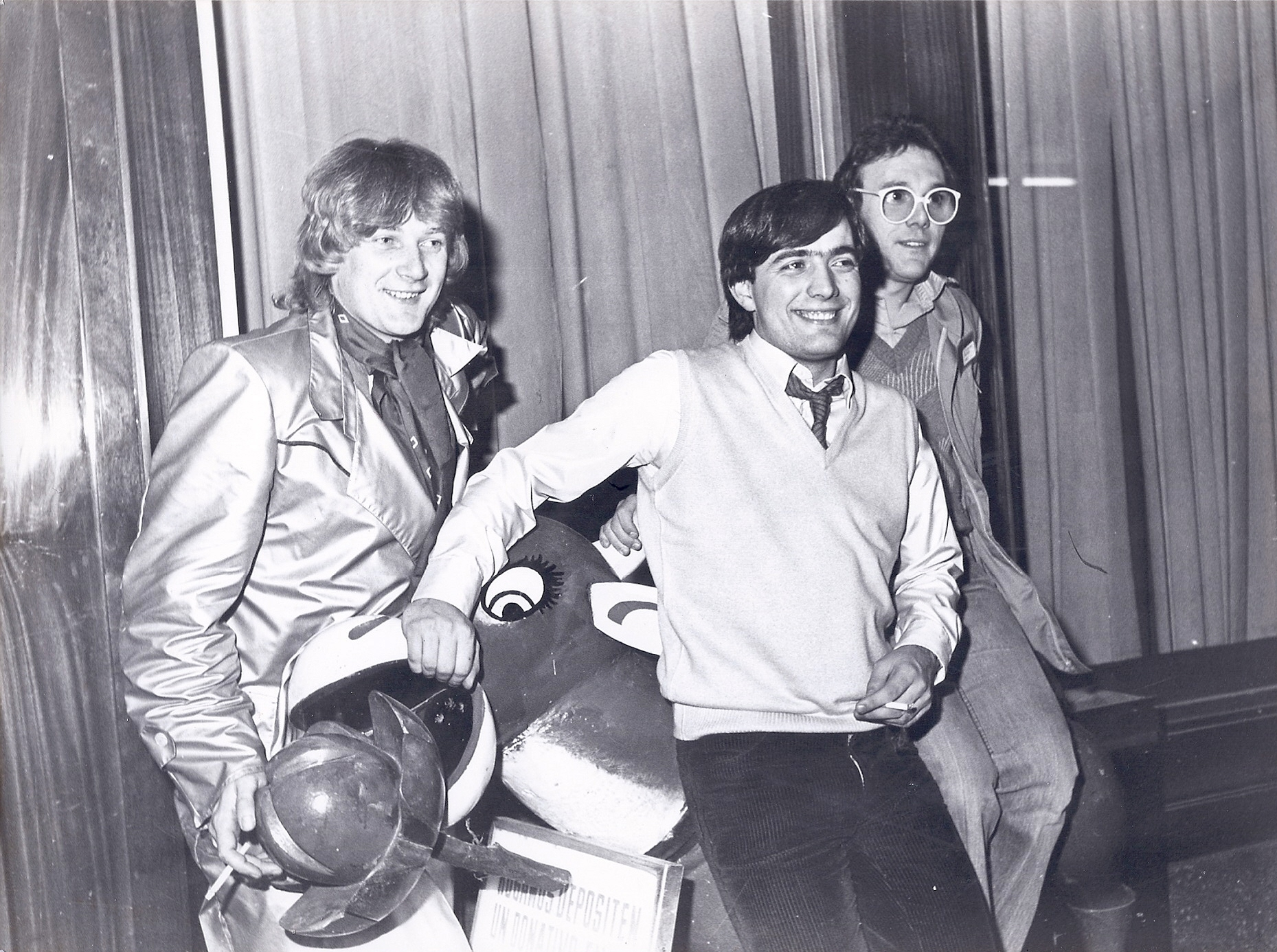
- Geoff Downes (far left) and Trevor Horn (far right) with Spanish host Xarli Diego on the show Caspe Street in 1980

Background information
- Origin: Wimbledon, London, England
- Genres: New wave; synth-pop; art pop; progressive pop
- Works: Discography
- Years active: 1977–1982; 1998; 2004; 2010; 2011; 2023–present
- Labels: Island; Carrere; ZTT; Sony Music Entertainment
- Members: Trevor Horn
- Past members: Geoff Downes; Bruce Woolley

The Buggles are an English new wave band formed in London in 1977. Their best-known lineup was as a duo of singer and bassist Trevor Horn and keyboardist Geoff Downes, with Bruce Woolley briefly contributing as a member from 1977 to 1979. They are best known for their 1979 debut single, "Video Killed the Radio Star", which topped the UK singles chart and reached number one in 15 other countries.

They released their debut studio album, The Age of Plastic, on the 10 January 1980. On 7 September 1979, "Video Killed the Radio Star" was released, serving as both the lead song of the album and the band's debut single. The modestly successful singles "Living in the Plastic Age", "Clean, Clean" and "Elstree" followed. Around this time, the group also produced the Jags' most successful single, "Back of My Hand", and helped with the production of Dan-I's sole hit, "Monkey Chop".

Soon after the album's release, Horn and Downes joined the progressive rock band Yes, recording and releasing Drama (1980) in the process. They also released their second and final studio album that year, Adventures in Modern Recording. After a tour to promote the album, the group disbanded in 1981. That same year, on 1 August, the music video for "Video Killed the Radio Star" became the first shown on MTV in the United States, It also was the final music video played on MTV Music when it ceased broadcasting on 31 December 2025.

Since 1998, Horn and Downes have occasionally performed the Buggles' songs. The band had its debut tour in 2023 in a lineup with Horn, but without Downes. Their most recent reunion occurred in 2023, and is currently ongoing as of 2025. In 2017, they planned a musical entitled The Robot Sings, although its fate is unknown. Their work has influenced popular acts such as Justice, Phoenix and Daft Punk, and has been covered by artists such as Erasure, Robbie Williams and Ben Folds Five.

== History ==
=== 1977–1979: Formation ===
Downes claimed the group's name derived as a pun on the rock band The Beatles, saying: "It was originally called the Bugs ... studio insects—imaginary creatures who lived in recording studios creating havoc. Then somebody said as a joke that the Bugs would never be as big as the Beatles. So we changed it to the Buggles." Horn later spoke of its name: "I know the name's awful, but at the time it was the era of the great punk thing. I'd got fed up of producing people who were generally idiots but called themselves all sorts of clever names like the Unwanted, the Unwashed, the Unheard ... when it came to choosing our name I thought I'd pick the most disgusting name possible. In retrospect I have frequently regretted calling myself Buggles, but in those days I never really thought much about packaging or selling myself, all that really concerned me was the record."

Horn began his career producing jingles and punk rock groups. Downes was a keyboardist in She's French and graduated from Leeds College of Music in 1975, after which he moved to London looking for keyboard work. The two first met in 1976 at auditions for Tina Charles' backing band and worked with her producer, Biddu, whose backing tracks had an influence on their early work as the Buggles. Horn met musician Bruce Woolley while playing the bass guitar in the house band at the Hammersmith Odeon. Both expressed an interest in Kraftwerk and Daniel Miller, leading them to read Crash by J. G. Ballard. Said Horn, "We had this idea that at some future point there'd be a record label that didn't really have any artists—just a computer in the basement and some mad Vincent Price-like figure making the records ... One of the groups this computer would make would be the Buggles, which was obviously a corruption of the Beatles, who would just be this inconsequential bunch of people with a hit song that the computer had written ... and would never be seen."

In 1977, Horn, Downes and Woolley got together and began recording a selection of demos in a small room above a stonemason shop in Wimbledon, south-west London, including "Video Killed the Radio Star", "Clean, Clean" and "On TV". Though unsure about what they wished to do with the demos, Downes remembered that "we knew even then ... there was some distant goal that had to be reached", and proceeded to re-record the songs at a 16-track recording studio in north London. Initial searches for the right record label to record and release an album failed, but Horn, having begun a relationship with Jill Sinclair, a co-founder of Sarm East Studios, managed to secure plans for a potential deal. However, the demo version of "Video Killed the Radio Star" caught the attention of producer Chris Blackwell of Island Records and, on the day on which Horn and Downes were due to sign with Sarm East, Blackwell offered them a more lucrative deal, which they accepted. Downes claimed Island rejected them three times before a final deal was agreed upon.

=== 1979–1980: The Age of Plastic ===
With the Island recording contract having been secured, the Buggles recorded their debut studio album, The Age of Plastic, through 1979. Initially, the demo of "Video Killed the Radio Star" featured vocals by Tina Charles, who also helped fund the project. Although the song was primarily a Woolley composition, he ended his association with Horn and Downes to form the Camera Club before the song's release as a single. Making The Age of Plastic involved several months of tiresome and intense experimentation with studio equipment and techniques, struggling to capture the "magic" of the original demos. Debi Doss and Linda Jardim-Allan, the female voices on "Video Killed the Radio Star", contributed their vocals to other songs on the album as well.

"Video Killed the Radio Star", the album's lead single, was released first in September 1979 to considerable commercial success, topping the chart in 16 countries. Its music video, directed by Russell Mulcahy, was the first video aired on MTV in the United States on 1 August 1981. Film composer Hans Zimmer makes a brief appearance in the video. The Age of Plastic was released in January 1980 and reached No. 27 on the UK Albums Chart. Three subsequent singles were released: "Living in the Plastic Age", "Clean, Clean" and "Elstree", all of which charted in the United Kingdom.

=== 1980–1981: Collaboration with Yes ===
In early 1980, Horn and Downes began work on a second Buggles album in London, working in a studio next door to that of the progressive rock band Yes, who had lost vocalist Jon Anderson and keyboardist Rick Wakeman following failed recording sessions for a potential new album. In particular, Horn had been a long-standing fan of Yes. The Buggles offered a song to Yes, "We Can Fly from Here", but at the suggestion of Brian Lane, manager of both bands, Yes's bassist Chris Squire invited them to actually replace Anderson and Wakeman as members of Yes. Horn and Downes accepted the offer and joined Squire, Steve Howe and Alan White to record Drama.

The absorption of the Buggles into Yes met with mixed reactions; the band was sometimes booed in the United Kingdom despite its chart position, but not in the United States. Horn admitted that he did not have Anderson's vocal range or style, which many fans missed, but most were still willing to give the new incarnation of Yes a chance. However, some press critics and fans were far less forgiving, especially in the United Kingdom. The US tour was much less financially successful than expected, and Yes disbanded in December 1980 after the Drama tour ended.

=== 1981–1982: Adventures in Modern Recording ===
In early 1981, following the disbanding of Yes, Downes and Horn reconvened at Sarm East Studios to record the Buggles' second studio album, Adventures in Modern Recording. However, Downes left the group on the day that the recording was to begin to help form Asia with Howe, citing musical differences. Horn was angry that Island Records renegotiated publishing terms for Downes to join Asia, but never did for Horn since, in his words, he was "washed up, career-wise." To fix this problem, Jill Sinclair made a deal with the French label Carrere, whose leader Claude Carrere, whom Horn described as a "very nice man", helped fund the album. Horn was now left to complete much of the album with several additional personnel.

Released in November 1981, Adventures in Modern Recording involved Horn's experimentation with numerous production techniques, especially with the heavy use of sampling with the Fairlight CMI, with instruments from the computer such as the drums on "Inner City" and the big band jazz sounds on "Vermillion Sands". These same sampling techniques would later be used in records that he produced, such as Slave to the Rhythm by Grace Jones, 90125 by Yes, The Seduction of Claude Debussy by Art of Noise, and Welcome to the Pleasuredome by Frankie Goes to Hollywood. While the album garnered little attention in the United Kingdom, Horn recalled in 2010 that it was a commercial success in France, and in the United States the album peaked at number 161 on the American Billboard 200. By the time of the album's release, when Horn was also producing the album The Lexicon of Love by ABC, he decided to take Sinclair's advice that he was always meant to be a producer rather than a performer or songwriter; thus the performance of "Lenny" on a Dutch television show, with ABC as the backing band, marked the end of the Buggles. As Horn recalled when he was interviewed after the show:

"I'll never forget it because the guy said to me, 'well, things are not looking so good for you', and I said 'how do you mean?' And he said 'well, you know, your first record was a big hit now this record is number eleven, so your career is going downhill'. And I said 'well you know what? You see these guys, this is a band called ABC and I'm a producer now I don't really care about this stuff, I'm just doing it to promote the record. And I may be on the skids as an artist but things are looking up in other areas. End of interview. Fuck off.'"

=== 1998–present: Reunion performances ===
Being largely a studio creation, the Buggles never toured. There were some Top of the Pops playback appearances, and later some performances for promotional purposes in support of the second album, but the first live outing by the original duo came in a low-key appearance on 3 December 1998 at a showcase for new bands on Horn's ZTT Records label at Mean Fiddler in north-west London. During this appearance, the Buggles played only "Video Killed the Radio Star", backed by singer Tessa Niles and one of the other groups on the bill, the Marbles.

On 11 November 2004, the Buggles reunited with Doss, Jardim-Allan and Woolley at Wembley Arena to perform "Video Killed the Radio Star" and "The Plastic Age" as part of a The Prince's Trust charity concert celebrating Horn's career as a producer.

On 28 September 2010, the Buggles performed their first actual concert, billed as "The Lost Gig", at Supperclub in Notting Hill, west London, as a fundraiser for the Royal Hospital for Neuro-disability. Following an opening performance by Orchestral Manoeuvres in the Dark, the Buggles' set included The Age of Plastic performed in its entirety, including Woolley singing with Horn on "Clean, Clean". Also featured were Lol Creme, Chris Braide, Alison Moyet, Gary Barlow, Richard O'Brien and Claudia Brücken.

On 25 October 2011, the Buggles reunited to play at the British Music Experience at the O2 Arena. The gig included the first live performance of "I Am a Camera" and covers of "Space Oddity" by David Bowie and "Check It Out" by Nicki Minaj and will.i.am, which utilised samples from "Video Killed the Radio Star". Kirsten Joy, Holly Petrie and Kate Westall provided backing vocals.

In 2013, Downes spoke of the chance of another reunion: "It's always a challenge working on new stuff, and I'd love to collaborate with Trevor again ... it's not impossibility, just a matter of making the planets align so that one day we can hopefully make it happen." In March 2015, Downes joined the Trevor Horn Band on stage at the Shepherd's Bush Empire to play "The Plastic Age" and "Video Killed the Radio Star". Horn and Downes reunited in the studio in early 2016 for more Buggles activity.

During April–June 2023, the Buggles were the support act for Seal during his 30th-anniversary tour, on which Horn was the musical director and bassist. This marked the group's first tour. The lineup was the same as Seal's backing band, led by Horn. Geoff Downes was not involved. The set list included songs from both the band's albums and material by Frankie Goes to Hollywood and Yes.

== Artistry and reception ==
Many of the lyrics Trevor Horn wrote were inspired by sci-fi works by writers such as J. G. Ballard. According to Geoff Downes;

"The whole idea of the Buggles was the use of technology in an art form. Hence, we tried to use synthesizers, studio gadgets, etc. to create these fake effects to parallel conventional music. The Polythene Symphonia at the end of Video Killed the Radio Star is one example. Our contributions to the Drama album were an extension of this in many ways."

Downes claims to have used George Shearing's "technique of doubling melody lines in block chords (using the 5th note)... quite extensively on some of the Buggles' recordings".

Both of the Buggles' albums have received positive reception from music critics. The Trouser Press called both albums "technically stunning, reasonably catchy and crashingly hollow," while AllMusic's Jeri Montesano said that, compared to 1990s pop music, they "still sound fresh".

== Legacy ==
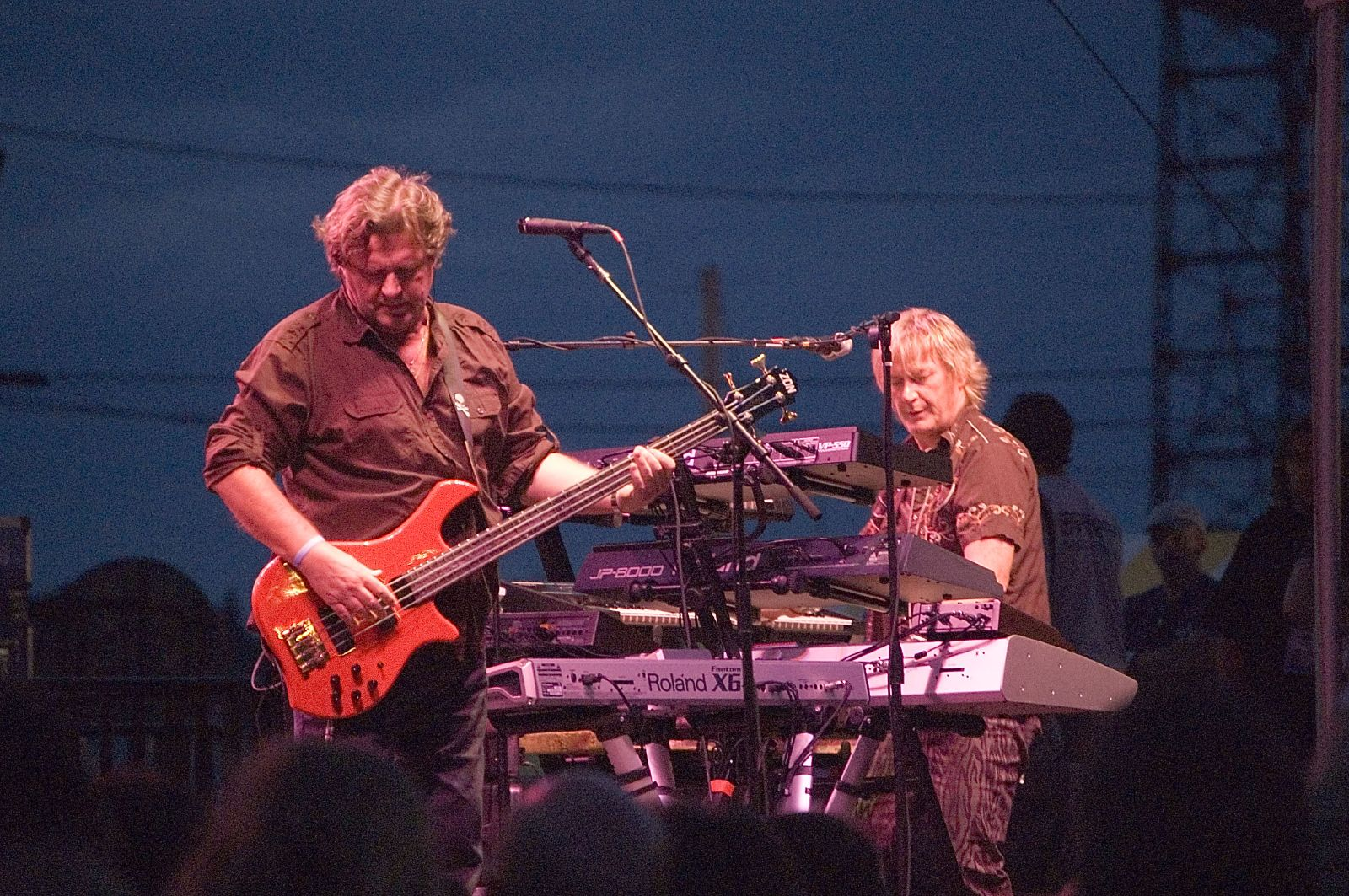
Geoff Downes (right) performing with Asia in 2006

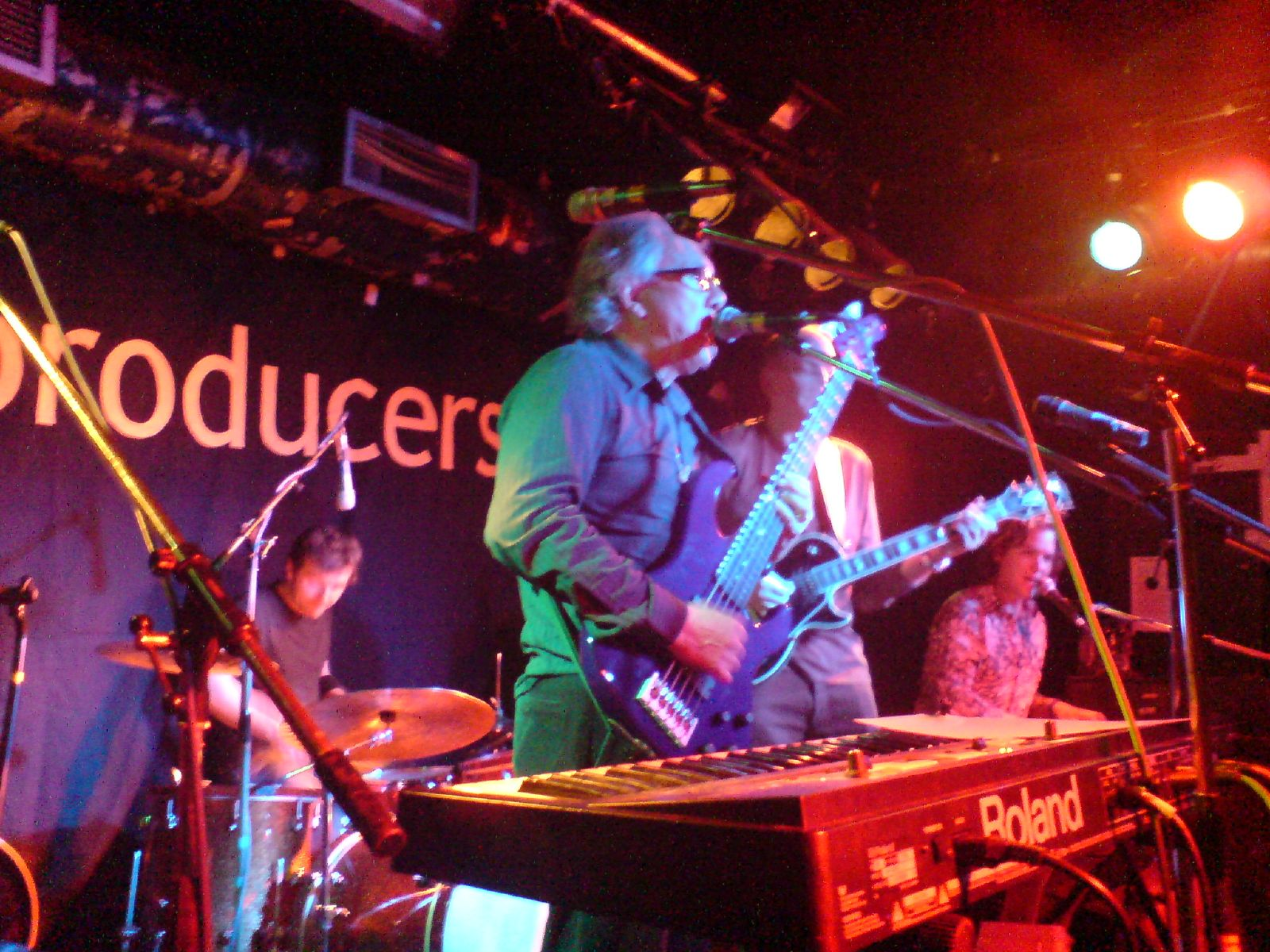
Trevor Horn performing with Producers in 2007

After leaving the Buggles, Downes joined his former Yes bandmate Steve Howe in forming the aforementioned supergroup Asia, together with John Wetton (formerly of King Crimson) and Carl Palmer (formerly of Emerson, Lake & Palmer), which made its name with the 1982 hit single "Heat of the Moment". Downes remains a member of Asia today. Parallel to Asia, he also worked on other projects, including several solo albums and production of acts such as GTR. In 2011, Downes rejoined Yes as their keyboardist, working once again alongside Horn on the album Fly from Here and accompanying tour.

Horn embarked on a highly successful career as a record producer, achieving success with the bands ABC, Dollar, Frankie Goes to Hollywood, Art of Noise, and even the albums 90125 and Big Generator from a re-formed Yes, with Jon Anderson back on vocals. In 1985, Horn won the Best Producer BRIT Award. More than twenty years on, he is still active, producing with Seal, Tina Turner, Paul McCartney, Tom Jones, Cher, Simple Minds, Belle and Sebastian, t.A.T.u., Charlotte Church, Captain, Pet Shop Boys and Robbie Williams among his many credits. He is currently working with his new band, the Producers, who released the album Made in Basing Street (2012). Both Asia and the Producers have played "Video Killed the Radio Star" as part of their live set in tribute to their members' origins in the Buggles.

In 2009, Horn produced the album Reality Killed the Video Star for British singer Robbie Williams. The album title pays homage to the trademark Buggles song, and Horn performed the song with Williams (Horn on bass and Williams on vocals) at the BBC Electric Proms on 20 October 2009.

Following 2010 discussions with Chris Squire, Horn produced the Yes album Fly from Here (2011), the bulk of whose 47-minute duration comprises unused or incomplete Buggles material from the early 1980s (particularly "We Can Fly from Here"), reminiscent of the use of the Buggles' I am a Camera for "Into the Lens" on Drama during their first stint in 1980. Horn brought in Downes to play keyboards on the album (replacing Oliver Wakeman, son of Rick Wakeman) and Horn himself also performed some parts and sang backing vocals on the album. The album's group photograph prominently features Horn standing centre, signifying that to all intents he was considered the sixth band member for the recording. The Fly From Here tour did not feature Horn. At the suggestion of Yes drummer Alan White, the band subsequently released a new version of the album entitled Fly from Here – Return Trip, with Horn recording new lead vocals (replacing Benoit David).

In February 2017, Bruce Woolley and his band the Radio Science Orchestra, released a new, dark ambient version of "Video Killed the Radio Star" with singer Polly Scattergood on vocals. The single was released on Gramophone Records, along with a music video featuring musician and producer Thomas Dolby and Wolfgang Wild of Retronaut fame.

=== The Robot Sings ===
On 8 March 2017, Horn posted an announcement on his official Facebook page, linking to an article on theatre website Broadway World that Horn, Downes and Woolley were working together on a musical provisionally entitled The Robot Sings. Based on The Tempest by William Shakespeare, and taking influence from sci-fi authors such as J. G. Ballard, Brian Aldiss and Isaac Asimov, the stage show was to tell the story of a boy called Jay trying to save his robot companion. The musical was to feature "Video Killed the Radio Star" as well as new compositions by Downes, and the script was to be written by Jack Woolley.

== Band members ==
=== Current ===
- Trevor Horn – lead vocals, bass, guitar, sound effects (1977–1982, 1998, 2004, 2010, 2011, 2023–present)

=== Former ===
- Geoff Downes – piano, keyboards, synthesizers, drums, percussion, backing vocals (1977–1981, 1998, 2004, 2010, 2011)
- Bruce Woolley – lead and backing vocals, guitar (1977–1979, 2004, 2010)

=== Touring ===
- Debi Doss – backing vocals (1979, 2004)
- Linda Jardim-Allen – backing vocals (1979, 2004; died 2015)
- Earl Harvin – drums (2023–present)
- Mat Dauzat – guitar (2023–present)
- Jamie Muhoberac – keyboards (2023–present)
- La Tanya Hall – backing vocals (2023–present)
- Everett Bradley – backing vocals, percussion (2023–present)

== Discography ==
=== Studio albums ===
- The Age of Plastic (1980)
- Adventures in Modern Recording (1981)

== See also ==
- List of one-hit wonders in the United States
