= Living in the Plastic Age =

1980 single by the Buggles

Single by the Buggles

from the album The Age of Plastic
- B-side: "Island"
- Released: 14 January 1980
- Recorded: 1979
- Genre: New wave; synth-pop
- Length: 5:08
- Label: Island
- Songwriters: Trevor Horn; Geoff Downes
- Producer: The Buggles

The Buggles singles chronology
"Video Killed the Radio Star" (1979)	"Living in the Plastic Age" (1980)	"Clean Clean" (1980)
- 8 tracks: 1. "Living in the Plastic Age"; 2. "Video Killed the Radio Star"; 3. "Kid Dynamo"; 4. "I Love You (Miss Robot)"; 5. "Clean, Clean"; 6. "Elstree"; 7. "Astroboy (And the Proles on Parade)"; 8. "Johnny on the Monorail"

Audio sample
- file; help

"Living in the Plastic Age" (on some releases simply listed as "The Plastic Age") is a synth-pop song written, performed and produced by the Buggles. It was recorded in 1979 and released as the second single from their debut studio album, The Age of Plastic (1980). The B-side of the single, "Island" was written as a 'Thank You' to their record company, Island Records, and appears as a bonus track on both the 2000 CD reissue and the 2010 Japanese CD reissue, Alongside the single version of "Living in the Plastic Age".

Upon its release, the song was positively received by music critics, some of which praising the track as one of the best from the album. Commercially, the single fared less successful than its predecessor, "Video Killed the Radio Star", although it was still decently successful, charting at number 16 on the UK Singles Chart and peaking at number 3 on the SNEP chart in France. The song's music video, directed by Russell Mulcahy, was the penultimate video aired on MTV's first day. It was also performed on Top of the Pops.

== Background and composition ==
The lyrics of "The Plastic Age" comment on the coldness of the culture of plastic technology in the 1970s. The song is five minutes and eight seconds long, and is played at a tempo of 140 beats per minute. The song begins with sounds of telephones ringing, and brief, garbled yells, before a piano, synthpop bass and drumbeat start the song. There are also vocals that build up each chorus of the song.

Trevor Horn remembers about the song:

"Listening back to the piano, bass and drums tracks was extraordinary. Paul Robinson played the drums on 'Video Killed The Radio Star' and Richard Burgess played the drums on 'Living In The Plastic Age', and I do remember that by the time we'd finished playing 'Living In The Plastic Age' Richard Burgess was pale! He was so worn out because we insisted that it sound perfect and that he played it perfectly. And the funny thing is that when you listen to it, it sounds like a drum machine. Both tracks sound like drum machines because at the time we were so manic about them having that spot-on perfect techno feel, not some sort of bullshit Elton John groovy album feel."

The 7" vinyl UK and Spanish version of the single included both the album version of the song on its A-side and the song "Island" on its B-side. In Spain, the song was released as "La Edad Del Plastico". The single's French and Netherlands 7" vinyl release included an edit version of the song on their A-side, but the song "Island" was still on the B-side of both those releases. The Canadian release of the 7" vinyl included the edit of the song on the A-side, but, instead of "Island", the song "Johnny on the Monorail" was included on the B-side.

A 2011 Japanese re-issue of The Age of Plastic album features the longer version as on the original vinyl album and also includes the shorter "single version" as a bonus track.

== Critical reception ==
=== Contemporary ===
In its 1980 review, Smash Hits listed the song as one of the best tracks on parent album "The Age of Plastic", alongside "Video Killed the Radio Star".

=== Retrospective ===
Don Ignacio, in a review of The Age of Plastic, gave the song an A+, and considered the song to be a highlight of the album. Krinein magazine wrote that songs from the album, "The Plastic Age", "Kid Dynamo", "Elstree" and "Johnny on the Monorail", were "equally effective in their melodies, rhythms and harmonies." Napster's Nicholas Baker said of "The Plastic Age" as one of the songs from the album that Trevor Horn's "considerable songwriting prowess" was evident in. In an AllMusic review of the album, the song was rated an AMG pick track.

== Commercial performance ==
"Living in the Plastic Age" was less successful than its predecessor, "Video Killed the Radio Star", although it was still modestly successful, peaking at number 16 on the UK Singles Chart. The song also performed decently worldwide. In Belgium, the single charted at number 17 on the Ultratop 50 in Flanders. In France, the single charted at number 3 on the SNEP chart, and was the forty-fifth best-selling song of 1980 in France, with sales of under 350,000 units. In the Netherlands, the single charted at number 29 on the Dutch Single Top 100, and peaked two spots higher, at number 27, on the Dutch Top 40. In Spain, the single charted at number 18 on the AFYVE chart. In West Germany, the single charted at number 29 on the GfK Entertainment charts.

== Music video ==
The Buggles also created an unusual, futuristic and illusion-like music video for the song. The video, directed by Russell Mulcahy, was only rarely shown on music channels but VH1 Classic occasionally airs the video. The music video for "Living in the Plastic Age" employed bright colours, harsh source lighting, much colour keying, and provocative motifs (women in body paint portraying inanimate objects). Fine Print Magazine found the video to be unmemorable. It was also the 208th and penultimate video aired on MTV on its first day.

The band also recorded a mimed performance of the song for Top of the Pops, originally broadcast on 24 January 1980, and a second performance two weeks later.

== Legacy ==
Will Harris of PopMatters said, in a 2003 review of Supertramp's album Breakfast in America, that the song "Living in the Plastic Age” might've had a keyboard bit cribbed from "Fool's Overture". A year later, in 2004, the Buggles reunited (including Debi Doss, Linda Allen and Bruce Wooley) at Wembley Arena to perform "Video Killed the Radio Star" and "The Plastic Age" in front of Prince Charles as part of a Prince's Trust charity concert celebrating Horn's career as a producer. French extreme metal band Carnival in Coal covered the song for their 2005 album Collection Prestige.

The song was performed at a September 2010 Buggles reunion performance, billed as "The Lost Gig", that took place at Ladbroke Grove's Supperclub, Notting Hill, London. It was a fund raiser with all earnings going to the Royal Hospital for Neuro-disability. With the exception of "The Plastic Age" and "Video Killed the Radio Star", "The Lost Gig" saw the first live performances of all songs from The Age of Plastic.

== Track listing ==
7" single

1. "The Plastic Age" [full-length version] - 5:10
2. "Island" [edit] - 3:33

7" single (UK promo)

1. "The Plastic Age" (Special Edited DJ Version) - 3:47
2. "The Plastic Age" [full-length version] - 5:10

7" single (Austria, Australia and Germany)

1. "The Plastic Age" [single version] - 3:51
2. "Island" [edit] - 3:33

7" single (Ireland, Portugal, Sweden)

1. "The Plastic Age" [full-length version] - 5:10
2. "Island" [full-length version] - 4:03

7" single (French release and German promo)

1. "The Plastic Age" [single version] - 3:51
2. "Island" [full-length version] - 4:03

7" single (Canada)

1. "Living In The Plastic Age" (Edit) - 3:47
2. "Johnny On The Monorail" - 5:26

== Charts ==
Weekly chart performance
Chart (1980)	Peak position
Austria (Ö3-Hitparade)	6
Belgium (Joepie)	13
Belgium (Ultratop 50 Flanders)	17
Luxembourg (Radio Luxembourg)	16
Netherlands (Dutch Top 40)	27
Netherlands (Mega Top 30) (Note: In all instances of the song's performance on the Mega Top 30, the artist name was incorrectly presented as "the Pagans".)	29
Netherlands (Single Top 100)	29
Portugal (Música & Som)	3
Spain (AFYVE)	18
UK Singles (OCC)	16
West Germany (GfK)	29
