= Elstree (song) =

Single by the Buggles

from the album The Age of Plastic
- B-side: "Johnny on the Monorail (A Very Different Version)"
- Released: 27 October 1980
- Genre: New wave; synth-pop
- Length: 4:33 (album version); 4:04 (single version); 3:35 (special DJ edit version)
- Label: Island
- Songwriters: Trevor Horn; Geoff Downes
- Producer: The Buggles

The Buggles singles chronology
"Clean Clean" (1980)	"Elstree" (1980)	"I Am a Camera" (1981)
- 8 tracks: 1. Living in the Plastic Age"; 2. "Video Killed the Radio Star"; 3. "Kid Dynamo"; 4. "I Love You (Miss Robot)"; 5. "Clean, Clean"; 6. "Elstree"; 7. "Astroboy (And the Proles on Parade)"; 8. "Johnny on the Monorail"

Music video
- "Elstree" on YouTube

"Elstree" is a song by English pop band the Buggles, released on their debut album, The Age of Plastic (1980). It was the fourth and final single released from the album, released on the 27th of October, 1980. The track, a new wave and synth-pop record, was written by group members Trevor Horn and Geoff Downes, who also produced the song. Lyrically, the song is about the studio of the same name. Upon its release, the song was positively received by music critics. Commercially, the single charted at number 55 on the UK Singles Chart. The song's music video features Horn as a janitor who reminisces on his time as an actors for films in the titular studio.

== Music and lyrics ==
The song is a tribute to Elstree Studios.

"Elstree" is a tribute to the U.K. film studios Elstree Studios. It follows the story of a failed actor who, according to Wave Maker Magazine, is "taking up a more regular position behind the scenes and looking back at his life in regret." The song is 4 minutes and 32 seconds long, and is played at a BPM of 136. Geoff Downes performed an old-sounding grand piano and a minimoog in the song to emulate an oboe.

== Releases ==
The single was released on 7" vinyl via Island Records across Europe and Japan. It was not given an America release. In the UK, the single was manufactured and distributed by EMI Records Ltd. The single was also issued in Brazil through Island Records and Ariola, which was the umbrella company in Brazil for Island Records at the time. For the single, the song was edited down by half a minute in comparison to the album version of the song. Despite this, the UK version of the single still dubbed the song "(Full-length Album Version)" on the A-side of the vinyl. The single included the B-side "Johnny on the Monorail (A Very Different Version)" which was written by Downes and Horn. As the title suggested, the song is a different version of the closing album track of The Age of Plastic. The version was originally exclusive to the single before it appeared as a bonus track on the 2000 remastered re-issue of The Age of Plastic album, amongst other re-issues of the album.

The majority of the releases of the single featured the same track listing, however the Japanese issue of the single, released on 21 July 1980 as a promotional release only, featured the full album version of "Elstree" and not the single version, whilst the B-side was "Island" which was originally the B-side to the band's second single "Living in the Plastic Age" from 1980. Most issues of the single featured a full colour sleeve with artwork of a Magic lantern-style movie projector. The Japanese release used different artwork, using an alternate design of the drawing of the duo first seen as the artwork on their 1979 debut single "Video Killed the Radio Star".

Additionally, a promotional single was released in the UK which featured "Elstree (Special DJ Version)" - a three and a half minute version of the song. This version was originally exclusive to the single but would later see release as a bonus track on the 2010 Japanese CD re-release of The Age of Plastic, along with the single version of "Elstree". The promotional single still featured the usual full colour sleeve.

== Reception ==
Upon its release as a single, Julie Birchill of the NME stated, "The Buggles ply us with yet more supercilious Poor You! pop. The[y] seem to like writing songs about popular commodities suddenly and brutally dropped by a bored public. I wonder where their beady eyes will alight next – Lassie, hula hoops, Ruth Ellis? I suggest they look a little closer to home. That's right, just look in the mirror; your next song should be called 'Buggles'." Commercially, the song peaked at #55 in the UK singles chart and lasted in the Top 100 for a total of four weeks. It was the band's final Top 100 release in the UK.

The Independent, on the 3rd of October, 2010, spoke of the song in a review of The Buggles' live performance "The Lost Gig" in London, where the author Simon Price stated "The Age of Plastic, played in order, and accompanied by films generally involving old footage of things that once, like the songs, felt impossibly futuristic. Then again, minor hits such as "Clean Clean" and "Elstree" sound radiantly relevant now." Krinein magazine reviewed the album in 2003, where writer L. Vincent stated "The great quality of The Age of Plastic is due to a whole in the spirit and the musical success of individual 'Video Killed the Radio Star'. For example, the titles "Living in the Plastic Age", "Kid Dynamo", "Elstree" and "Johnny On The Monorail" are quite as effective in their melodies, their rhythms and their harmonies."

Nicholas Baker of Napster spoke of the song in a review of the album, stating "Don't overlook this '80s pop classic. Production deity Trevor Horn had more in him than just "Video Killed the Radio Star." His considerable songwriting prowess is also evident on "Plastic Age," "Elstree" (a tribute to the famed U.K. film studios) and "Clean Clean."

== Music video ==
Trevor Horn (top right) as he appears in the video as a BBC janitor on a cemetery set, while black-and-white characters (bottom) play as various roles he recalls in the song.

A music video was filmed featuring Trevor Horn as a BBC janitor cleaning a cemetery set on a sound stage as he recalls his days as a bit player in Elstree Studio b-films. Intercut with scenes of black and white sword fighting and retro movie scenes are included in the video. As Horn reminisces, black-and-white footage of his "films" play, illustrating the various roles he recalls in the song.

== Live performances ==
On 28 September 2010, The Buggles reunited to play their first full-length live concert. The event was billed as "The Lost Gig" and took place at "Ladbroke Grove's Supperclub", Notting Hill, London, and was a fund raiser with all earnings going to the Royal Hospital for Neuro-disability. Except "Video Killed the Radio Star" and "The Plastic Age" which the band had previously played together, "The Lost Gig" saw the first live performances of all songs from The Age of Plastic, which included "Elstree".

== Legacy ==
The song was parodied in the 1983 Central TV 'Christmas Tape', with reference made about the move from the ATV Elstree Studios to the then new Lenton Lane Studios in Nottingham - a voice-over from an advert for Tunes menthol sweets is played at the end: 'A Second Class Return to Nottingham, please'. Gigi D'Agostino reused parts of the song's melodic structure for his 1999 hit "Another Way".

== Track listing ==
7" Single

1. "Elstree" - 4:05
2. "Johnny on the Monorail (A Very Different Version)" - 3:54

7" Single (Japanese promo release)

1. "Elstree" - 4:27
2. "Island" - 3:31

7" Single (UK promotional release)

1. "Elstree (Special DJ Version)" - 3:35
2. "Johnny on the Monorail (A Very Different Version)" - 3:54

== Charts ==
Chart (1980)	Peak position
UK Singles Chart	55

== Personnel ==
- Geoff Downes – keyboards, drums, percussion, producer
- Trevor Horn – vocals, bass guitar, guitar, producer
- Paul Robinson - drums
- Richard James Burgess – drums
- John Sinclair - mixing
