= Dan-I =

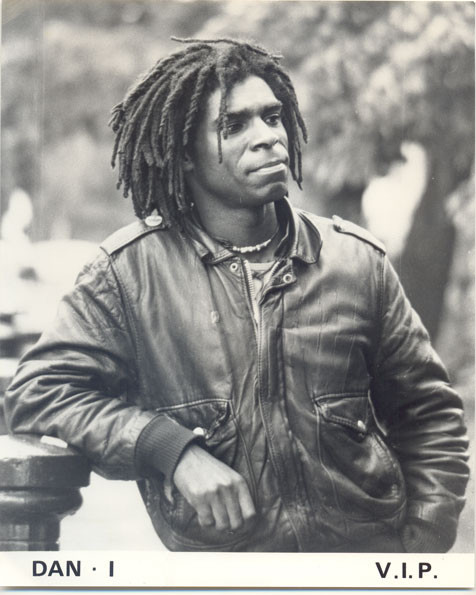

Background information
- Born: Selmore Ezekiel Lewinson; 1 July 1951
- Died: 19 May 2006 (aged 54)
- Occupation: Musician
- Labels: Island; Dan-I

Dan-I (born Selmore Ezekiel Lewinson; July 1951 – 19 May 2006) was a British disco musician, signed to Island Records, who had a Top 30 hit in the UK Singles Chart in 1979 with a single called "Monkey Chop,” which later climbed to number 11 on “Top of the Pops” in Sweden by March 1980 and in the Top Ten in Milan, Italy and in New Zealand. He originated from Clarendon, Jamaica. Without any further chart success, Dan-I remains listed as a one-hit wonder, although he continued to release several albums as a solo artist under independent record labels and as lead singer for various other bands, most notably the L.A.-based gospel reggae band, Unity, in the 1980s.

== Career and background ==
His stage name derived from his interest in numerology, meaning "number one". In the early 1970s he was asked by George Clinton to join his band Funkadelic, but he declined, believing he was too young. During the 1970s he worked with Cat Stevens, Andy Fraser, and Joe Jammer, and led his own club band, D-Dancer. D-Dancer split up in 1976, after which Dan-I spent a year in Nigeria before embarking on a solo career, signing with Island Records after being introduced by Linton Kwesi Johnson, and having a major hit with "Monkey Chop", which he described as "music for the new optimism". The song was produced by Trevor Horn and Geoff Downes.

He moved to Los Angeles, California in the mid-1980s, where he recorded several demos. During the 1980s, he helped found The Unity Gospel Band. He was also connected with a release by Unity, For The Glory Of Jah. He provided the lead vocals for the release. He provided backing vocals for Busta Jones's 1988 single, "My Hands Are Shakin'".

He then moved to South Africa before returning to London.

== UK discography (unless stated otherwise) ==
7" Singles
Title	Release info	Year	Notes
"Monkey Chop" / "Roller (Do It) Boogie"	Island WIP 6520	1979	
"Hidden Valley" / "Action"	Island WIP 6572	1980	
"Let's Be An Animal" / "Free Prison"	Aura AUS 123	1980	

12" Singles
Act	Title	Release info	Year	Notes
Dan-I	"Hidden Valley" / "Dennis And The Spider", "Action" (long version)	Island 12WIP 6572	1980	
Dan I & Big Youth	"Who Killed The Prophets" / "Monkey Chop"	V.I.P Records 007		

Albums
Title	Release info	Year	F	Notes
Sure Love The Feeling	Selmore Records ALPSEL001	1989	LP	
Nicely Nicely	The Vodka Label VDK 8001	1984	LP	US release
Living Figures	Onset Records OSET CD 001	1999	CD	

Other releases
Act	Title	Release info	Year	F	Notes
Unity	For The Glory Of Jah	Unity Productions UP 204A		Cass	L voc: Dan-I Lewinson; Bass: Raymond Barrow; Drums: Derrick Smith; Guitar: Lesmond Sosa; Keys: Craig Tomblin
Simultations	Dan-I	Dan-I Records	2005	CD-R	
Dan-I	Listen to the Magic	Welovemusic.de	2023		Selmore/Skliris/Deligiannides
Dan-I	Stand Up	Welovemusic.de	2023	performed by Kokomo	Selmore/Skliris/Deligiannides
