= Joepie =

Belgian youth magazine (1973–2015)

- Categories: Youth magazine; Music magazine
- Frequency: Weekly (1973–April 2015); Monthly (from April 2015)
- Founded: 1973
- First issue: 28 February 1973
- Final issue: 2015
- Company: De Persgroep
- Country: Belgium
- Language: Dutch
- OCLC: 971494300

Joepie (Dutch: Yippie) was a weekly youth and music magazine published in Belgium. The magazine appeared between 1973 and 2015.

== History and profile ==
Joepie was first published on 28 February 1973. The founding company was N.V. Sparta which was later renamed as Magnet Magazines. It was the precursor of De Persgroep. Guido Van Liefferinge was the founding editor-in-chief of the magazine which was published in Dutch.

Joepie published photonovels which featured the Belgian singers such as Willy Sommers, Micha Mara, Paul Severs, Jimmy Frey and John Terra. The magazine was redesigned in 1985 to improve its sales and became a publication with a focus on pop music celebrities. It began to target 12-17 years old girls after its redesign. The publications of photonovels ended in February 2014. The magazine sold 31,133 copies in February 2015. Joepie folded in the late 2015 due to lower circulation levels. Shortly before its closure the frequency of the magazine was redesigned as monthly in April 2015.

Two special issues of Joepie were published in 2019 and in 2023 for charity purposes.
