= Monkey Chop =

Single by Dan-I

from the album Monkey Chop
- B-side: "Rollercide (Part One)"
- Released: 1979
- Genre: Disco
- Length: 3:33
- Label: Island
- Songwriter: Selmore Ezekiel Lewinson (Dan I)
- Producer: Selmore Ezekiel Lewinson (Dan I)

Monkey Chop is a single by British disco artist Dan-I, and is widely recognized as a "one-hit wonder". It was produced by Dan-I.

== Track listing ==
The single "Monkey Chop" had two A-side-, and two B-side songs:

- Side A:
  1. "Monkey Chop"
  2. "We Got Time"
- Side B:
  1. "Roller (Do It) Boogie"
  2. "Rollercide (Part One)"

== Chart positions ==
=== Weekly charts ===
Chart (1979–1980)	Peak position
Italy (FIMI)	6
New Zealand (Recorded Music NZ)	4
Sweden (Sverigetopplistan)	11
UK Singles (OCC)	30

=== Year-end charts ===
Chart (1980)	Position
Italy (FIMI)	28
