= Video Killed the Radio Star =

1979 song by Trevor Horn, Geoff Downes and Bruce Woolley

- Standard picture sleeve

Single by the Buggles

from the album The Age of Plastic
- B-side: "Kid Dynamo"
- Released: 7 September 1979
- Recorded: 1979
- Studio: Virgin's Town House (London); Sarm East (London)
- Genre: New wave; synth-pop; electropop
- Length: 4:13 (album version); 3:25 (single version)
- Label: Island
- Songwriters: Geoff Downes; Trevor Horn; Bruce Woolley
- Producers: Trevor Horn; Geoff Downes

The Buggles singles chronology
"Video Killed the Radio Star" (1979)	"Living in the Plastic Age" (1980)
- 8 tracks: 1. "Living in the Plastic Age"; 2. "Video Killed the Radio Star"; 3. "Kid Dynamo"; 4. "I Love You (Miss Robot)"; 5. "Clean, Clean"; 6. "Elstree"; 7. "Astroboy (And the Proles on Parade)"; 8. "Johnny on the Monorail"

Music video
- "Video Killed the Radio Star" on YouTube

"Video Killed the Radio Star" is a song written by Trevor Horn, Geoff Downes, and Bruce Woolley in 1979. It was recorded concurrently by Bruce Woolley and the Camera Club (with Thomas Dolby on keyboards) for their debut studio album, English Garden, and by British new wave/synth-pop group the Buggles, which consisted of Horn and Downes (and initially Woolley). The Buggles' version of the track was recorded and mixed in 1979, released as their debut single on 7 September 1979 by Island Records, and included on their debut studio album, The Age of Plastic.

The song relates to concerns about and mixed attitudes toward 20th-century inventions and machines for the media arts. The song has been positively received by music critics, with its reviewers praising its unusual musical pop elements. On release, the Buggles' version topped sixteen international record charts, including those in the United Kingdom, Australia, and Japan. It also peaked in the top 10 in Canada, Germany, New Zealand and South Africa, but only reached number 40 in the United States. It has also been certified Platinum in the United Kingdom and France, and has sold 5,000,000 copies worldwide.

The accompanying music video was written, directed, and edited by Russell Mulcahy. It was the first music video shown on MTV in the US, airing at 12:01 a.m. on 1 August 1981, and the first video shown on MTV Classic in the UK on 1 March 2010. It was also the final music video played on MTV Music in the UK before it closed down on 31 December 2025. The song has received several critical accolades, such as being ranked number 40 on VH1's "100 Greatest One-Hit Wonders of the '80s". The song has also been covered by many recording artists, including Ben Folds Five, The Presidents of the United States of America, Robbie Williams, and Erasure.

== Background and lyrics ==
The Buggles, formed in 1977, first consisted of Trevor Horn, Geoff Downes and Bruce Woolley. They recorded the first demo of "Video Killed the Radio Star" on a Revox A77 tape recorder one afternoon in 1978 in Downes' flat, located above a monumental stonemason's in Wimbledon Park, London. The piece was built up from a chorus riff developed by Woolley. It is one of the three Buggles songs on which Woolley assisted in writing, the two others being "Clean, Clean" and "On TV". A later, more detailed demo of the song, featuring Horn's then-girlfriend Tina Charles on vocals, was recorded at Camden's Soundsuite Studios and engineered by studio owner Peter Rackham. This demo became the blueprint for the final record, and helped the group get signed to Island Records to record and release their debut album, The Age of Plastic. The group also produced and wrote for the label after Downes' girlfriend, who worked for Island, managed to get the demo played to executives there. Woolley left during recording to form his own band, The Camera Club, which did their own version of "Video", as well as "Clean, Clean" for their album English Garden.

Horn has said that J. G. Ballard's short story "The Sound-Sweep", in which the title character—a mute boy vacuuming up stray music in a world without it—comes upon an opera singer hiding in a sewer, provided inspiration for "Video", and he felt "an era was about to pass." Horn claimed that Kraftwerk was another influence of the song: "It was like you could see the future when you heard Kraftwerk, something new is coming, something different. Different rhythm section, different mentality. So we had all of that, myself and Bruce, and we wrote this song probably six months before we recorded it." In a 2018 interview, Horn stated: "I'd read JG Ballard and had this vision of the future where record companies would have computers in the basement and manufacture artists. I'd heard Kraftwerk's The Man-Machine and video was coming. You could feel things changing".

All the tracks of The Age of Plastic deal with positives and concerns of the impact of modern technology. The theme of "Video Killed the Radio Star" is thus nostalgia, with the lyrics referring to a period of technological change in the 1960s, the desire to remember the past, and the disappointment that children of the current generation would not appreciate the past. The lyrics relate to concerns of the varied behaviours towards 20th-century technical inventions and machines used in media arts such as photography, cinema, radio, television, audio recording and record production. According to Horn, the band initially struggled to come up with a line to follow the song's opening ("I heard you on the wireless back in '52"). He eventually came up with "Lying awake intent at tuning in on you", inspired by memories of listening to Radio Luxembourg at night as a child. Woolley worried about the song's name, given the existence of a band with the name Radio Stars and a song titled "Video King" by singer Snips.

== The Buggles version ==
=== Development and composition ===
The Buggles' version of "Video Killed the Radio Star" is a new wave, synth-pop, and electropop song. It performs like an extended jingle, sharing its rhythm characteristics with disco. The piece plays in common time at a bright tempo of 132 beats per minute. It is in the key of D♭ major, and six basic chords are used in the song's chord progression. According to Geoff Downes, "It's actually a lot more complicated piece of music than people think, for instance part of the bridge is actually suspended chords and minor 9ths. A lot of people transcribed the song wrongly, they thought it was a straight F# chord. The song was written in D flat. The suspended gives it a slightly different feel." Writing in his book, Pop Music: Technology and Creativity: Trevor Horn and the Digital Revolution, Timothy Warner said that the "relatively quiet introduction" helped the listener detect a high amount of "tape hiss" generated through the use of analog multi-track tape recorders, as well as the timbre of the synthesized instruments, give an indication of the technical process and time of producing the song.

"Video Killed the Radio Star"
The final chorus of "Video Killed the Radio Star". There are instruments of electric guitars, a bass guitar, drums, and synths arranged in the track, and the male and female singers' accents and effects differ to give a historical and tonal contrast.

Horn and Downes tried to interest labels in the song, but were turned down multiple times, including by Island Records. Downes' then girlfriend worked for Island and was able to get the song listened to again. The demo ended up being heard by Chris Blackwell, who chose to sign the band. The song took more than three months of production. In 2018 Downes stated that the version that was released was rewritten from that recorded for the band's demo tape: the verses were extended and Downes contributed a new intro and middle eight, with the bulk of the original song having already been written by Horn and Woolley when he joined. The instrumental track was recorded at Virgin's Town House in West London in twelve hours, with mixing and recording of vocals held at Sarm East Studios. The entire song was mixed through a Trident TSM console. "Video" was the first track recorded for the group's debut LP, The Age of Plastic, which cost a sum of £60,000 (equivalent to £327,899 in 2025) to produce, and the song was mixed by Gary Langan four or five times. According to Langan, "there was no total recall, so we just used to start again. We’d do a mix and three or four days later Trevor would go, 'It's not happening. We need to do this and we need to do that.' The sound of the bass drum was one of his main concerns, along with his vocal and the backing vocals. It was all about how dry and how loud they should be in the mix without the whole thing sounding ridiculous. As it turned out, that record still had the loudest bass drum ever for its time."

The song includes instrumentation of drums, bass guitar, electric guitar, synth strings, piano, glockenspiel, marimbas and other futuristic, twinkly sounds, and vocals. Downes used a Solina, Minimoog and Prophet-5 to create the overdubbed orchestral parts. The male and female voices differ to give a tonal and historical contrast. When Langan was interviewed in December 2011, he said he believed that the male vocal was recorded through either a dynamic Shure SM57, SM58, Sennheiser MD 421, or STC 4038 ribbon microphone, and that four or five takes were done. The male voice echoes the song's theme in the tone of the music, initially limited in bandwidth to give a "telephone" effect typical of early broadcasts, and the singer uses a Mid-Atlantic accent resembling that of British singers of the 1950s and '60s. The Vox AC30 amplifier was used to achieve the telephone effect, and Gary Langan says he was trying to make it "loud without cutting your head off". Langan and Horn also tried using a bullhorn, but they found it too harsh. Langan later compressed and EQ'ed the male vocals, and he said that doing the compression for old-style vocal parts was a "real skill". The female vocals are panned in the left and right audio channels, and they sound more modern and have a New York accent.

The single version of "Video Killed the Radio Star" lasts for 3 minutes and 25 seconds. The album version plays for 4 minutes and 13 seconds, about 48 seconds longer than the single version, as it fades into a piano and synth coda, titled "Polythene Symphonia", which ends with a brief sampling of the female vocals.

=== Critical reception ===
The song became a Billboard Top Single Pick on 3 November 1979. The publication found the chorus catchy and also highlighted the orchestral instruments supporting the backing singers. Although there had been a mixed review of the single from Smash Hits by Andy Partridge of XTC, who found the song to be "too tidy, like Vymura" (wallpaper), they listed it in a review of The Age of Plastic as one of the best tracks of the album, along with "Living in the Plastic Age". Timothy Warner wrote that, although several common pop elements were still present in the song, it included stronger originality for its own purpose than most other pop hits released at the time. These unusual pop music characteristics include the timbres of the male and female vocal parts, and the use of suspended fourth and ninths chords for enhancement in its progression. He also felt it was unnecessary to dislike it as a "novelty song". AllMusic's Heather Phares said the track "can be looked on as a perfectly preserved new wave gem", "just as the song looks back on the radio songs of the '50s and '60s". She concluded her review by saying that it "still sounds as immediate as it did when it was released, however, and that may be the song's greatest irony".

However, many writers called Woolley's recording of "Video" much better than the Buggles' version. This included one critic who called both acts overall as of being very high quality, but felt that Woolley's version was more faithful to the source material than that of the Buggles, noting the filtered vocals and cute, female vocals of the latter rendition as giving it a novelty feel. However, he also wrote of liking both versions of "Clean, Clean" on the same level. For what it's worth, the Woolley version ranked number 18 for 2 weeks on Canada's CHUM Chart, 19 and 26 May 1980.

In 2024, Billboard recognized "Video Killed the Radio Star" as one of the 100 greatest songs about the music industry, ranking it at number one.

==== Accolades ====
Publication/TV show/author(s)	Country	Accolade	Year	Rank
20 to 1	Australia	Top 20 One Hit Wonders	2006	3
Bruce Pollock	United States	The 7,500 Most Important Songs of 1944–2000	2005	*
Giannis Petridis	Greece	2004 of the Best Songs of the Century	2003	*
Gilles Verlant, Thomas Caussé	France	3000 Rock Classics	2009	*
The Guardian	United Kingdom	The Top 100 British Number 1 Singles		53
Hervé Bourhis	France	Le Petit Livre Rock: The Juke Box Singles 1950-2009	2009	*
Les Inrockuptibles	France	1000 Indispensable Songs	2006	*
Mashable	United States	32 Unforgettable Music Videos	2013	*
MSN Music	United Kingdom	Best Song Titles Ever	2003	19
NBC-10	United States	The 30 Best Songs of the 80s	2006	*
Pause & Play	United States	Songs Inducted into a Time Capsule, One Track at Each Week		*
PopMatters	United States	The 100 Best Songs Since Johnny Rotten Roared	2003	73
Q	United Kingdom	The 1010 Songs You Must Own (Q50: One-hit Wonders)	2004	*
Time	United States	Top 10 MTV Moments	2010	*
Time Out	United Kingdom	100 Songs That Changed History		100
Triple J Hottest 100	Australia	Hottest 100 of All Time	1998	79
VH1	United States	100 Greatest One-Hit Wonders of the 80's	2009	40
VH1	United States	100 Greatest Videos	2001	79
Volume!	France	200 Records that Changed the World	2008	*
Xfinity	United States	Top 10 Groundbreaking Videos		10
WhatCulture!	United States	10 Controversial Music Videos That Look Tame Today	2013	*
WOXY.com	United States	The 500 Best Modern Rock Songs of All Time	2008	348
"*" indicates the list is unordered.

=== Commercial performance ===
"Video Killed the Radio Star" was a huge commercial success, reaching number one on 16 national charts. The song made its debut on the UK Singles Chart in the Top 40 at number 24, on the issue dated 29 September 1979. The next week, the track entered into the chart's top ten at number six before topping the chart on the week of 20 October. It was the 444th UK number-one hit in the chart's entire archive. In 2022, the single was certified platinum by the British Phonographic Industry (BPI) for UK sales and streams of 600,000 units.

In Australia, "Video Killed the Radio Star" reached Number 1, and for 27 years it held the country's record for best-selling single. In late 1979, while the single was still in an eight-week run at Number 1 in the charts, the single was awarded a platinum disc by Festival Records, the record's distributing company, for sales of over 100,000 copies in Australia. The song also made a Number 1 peak in France and Spain, where it was certified gold and platinum, respectively, as well as peaking in Austria, Ireland, Sweden, and Switzerland. In other parts of Europe and Oceania, "Video Killed the Radio Star" was a Number 2 hit in Germany and New Zealand, and it also charted in Flanders on the Ultratop 50 and in the Netherlands on the Nationale Hitparade Top 50 (now the Single Top 100) and Dutch Top 40.

"Video Killed the Radio Star" did not start charting in North America, however, until November 1979. In the United States, the song appeared on the Billboard Hot 100 and Cash Box Top 100, barely breaking into the Top 40 on both charts. In a 2015 list from Billboard, it tied with Marvin Gaye's recording of "The End of Our Road" as the "Biggest Hot 100 Hit" at the peak of Number 40. "Video Killed the Radio Star" debuted at Number 86 on the Billboard Hot 100 on the week of 10 November 1979, while on the Cash Box Top 100 it debuted at Number 83 that same week. It started also at Number 83 on the Canadian RPM Top Single Chart. By January 1980, it entered the Top 40 at number 31, and on 2 February made it into the Top 20 at Number 11. Two weeks later, the song earned its peak in the Top 10 at Number 6 and issue dated 16 February 1980.

=== Music video ===
==== Production and concept ====
Trevor Horn (right) and Geoff Downes (left) as they appear in the video

The music video for "Video Killed the Radio Star" was written, directed, and edited by Australian Russell Mulcahy. It was produced on a budget of $50,000. The video was shot in one day in South London and was edited over two days. Around 30 takes were required for shots of the actress in the tube. The tube falls over in the video, although Mulcahy claims it was not intended to be shown in the final edit. Hans Zimmer can be briefly seen wearing black playing a keyboard, and Debi Doss and Linda Jardim-Allen, who provided the female vocals for the song, are also seen.

The video begins with a young girl sitting in front of a radio. A black-and-white shot of Trevor Horn singing into an early radio-era microphone is superimposed over the young girl by the radio. The radio explodes by the time of the first chorus. During the second verse, the girl is transported into the future, where she meets Horn and a silver-jumpsuited woman in a clear plastic tube. Shots of Horn and Geoff Downes are shown during the remainder of the video.

==== Broadcasting and reception ====
The music video was first released in 1979, when it was originally broadcast on the BBC's Top of the Pops for promotion of the single, in lieu of doing live performances. Zimmer recalled in 2001 that the video drew criticism from some viewers who watched it before it aired on MTV, due to being "'too violent' because we blew up a television." The music video for "Video Killed the Radio Star" is notable as the first video ever played on MTV, when the US channel began broadcasting at 12:01 AM on 1 August 1981. On 27 February 2000, it became the one millionth video to be broadcast on MTV. It also opened MTV Classic in the UK and Ireland. The video marked the closing of MTV Philippines before its shutdown on 15 February 2010 at 11:49 PM. It was also the final video aired when MTV Music ceased broadcasting in the United Kingdom and Ireland on 31 December 2025. MTV co-founder Bob Pittman said the video "made an aspirational statement. We didn't expect to be competitive with radio, but it was certainly a sea-change kind of video." In July 2013, multiple independent artists covered the song for the launch of the TV channel Pivot, which launched with the music video of the cover on 1 August at 6 am.

=== Track listing ===
1. "Video Killed the Radio Star"
2. "Kid Dynamo"

=== Charts ===
==== Weekly charts ====
Year	Chart	Peak position
1979–1980
1979–1980	Argentina (CAPIF)	15
1979–1980	Australia (Kent Music Report)	1
1979–1980	Austria (Ö3 Austria Top 40)	1
1979–1980	Belgium (Ultratop 50 Flanders)	12
1979–1980	Belgium (Joepie)	12
1979–1980	Canada Top Singles (RPM)	6
1979–1980	Europe (Europarade)	1
1979–1980	France (IFOP)	1
1979–1980	Germany (GfK)	2
1979–1980	Ireland (IRMA)	1
1979–1980	Italy (Hit Parade)	1
1979–1980	Italy (Musica e Dischi)	1
1979–1980	Italy (TV Sorrisi e Canzoni)	1
1979–1980	Japan (Oricon International Chart)	1
1979–1980	Japan (Oricon Singles Chart)	25
1979–1980	Netherlands (Dutch Top 40)	17
1979–1980	Netherlands (Single Top 100)	16
1979–1980	New Zealand (Recorded Music NZ)	2
1979–1980	Portugal (Música & Som)	2
1979–1980	Quebec non-French Songs (ADISQ)	4
1979–1980	South Africa (Springbok Radio)	6
1979–1980	Spain (AFE)	1
1979–1980	Sweden (Sverigetopplistan)	1
1979–1980	Switzerland (Schweizer Hitparade)	1
1979–1980	UK Singles (Official Charts)	1
1979–1980	US Billboard Hot 100	40
1979–1980	US Cash Box	40
2013	France (SNEP)	190

==== Year-end charts ====
Year	Chart	Position
1979	Australia (Kent Music Report)	18
1979	Belgium (Ultratop 50 Flanders)	94
1979	France (IFOP)	3
1979	UK Singles (OCC)	17
1980	Australia (Kent Music Report)	46
1980	Austria (Ö3 Austria Top 40)	14
1980	Canada (RPM Top Singles)	30
1980	Germany (Media Control Charts)	43
1980	Italy (Musica e dischi)	1
1980	Italy (TV Sorrisi e Canzoni)	2
1980	Spain (AFE)	7

=== Certifications and sales ===
Region	Certification	Certified units/sales
Denmark (IFPI Danmark)	Gold	45,000^{‡}
France (SNEP)	Platinum	1,200,000
Italy (FIMI)	Gold	50,000^{‡}
Japan (RIAJ) 2007 digital release	Gold	100,000^{*}
New Zealand (RMNZ)	2× Platinum	60,000^{‡}
Spain (Promusicae)	Gold	25,000^{^}
Spain (Promusicae) Sales since 2015	Gold	30,000^{‡}
United Kingdom (BPI)	Platinum	1,000,000^{‡}
Summaries
Worldwide	—	5,000,000
^{*} Sales figures based on certification alone.^{^} Shipments figures based on certification alone.^{‡} Sales+streaming figures based on certification alone.

=== Personnel ===
==== Musicians ====
- Geoff Downes – keyboards, percussion
- Trevor Horn – lead vocals, bass guitar
- Debi Doss – backing vocals, chorus vocals
- Linda Jardim-Allen – backing vocals, chorus vocals
- Dave Birch – guitars
- Phil Towner – drums

==== Technical ====
- Gary Langan – mixing, recording
- Hugh Padgham – recording, audio engineering
- John Dent – mastering

== Bruce Woolley and the Camera Club version ==
"Video Killed the Radio Star"
- Italian single release

Single by Bruce Woolley and the Camera Club

from the album English Garden
- B-side: "Get Away William"
- Released: June 1979
- Recorded: 1979
- Length: 2:49
- Label: Epic
- Songwriters: Geoff Downes; Trevor Horn; Bruce Woolley
- Producer: Mike Hurst

Woolley's version was the first to be released, as a June 1979 single with his group the Camera Club on Epic Records, backed with "Get Away William" (written by Woolley and Dave Birch). It was also included on their debut studio album English Garden later that year. Their version was recorded in the same year as the Buggles' version, and was produced by Mike Hurst. Thomas Dolby, who helped produce the Buggles' version, played the keyboards on Woolley's version. Another contributor to the Buggles' version, Dave Birch, also contributed guitars to Woolley's version.

=== Track listing ===
1. "Video Killed the Radio Star"
2. "Get Away William"

=== Personnel ===
==== Musicians ====
- Bruce Woolley – vocals, guitar
- Dave Birch – guitar
- Matthew Seligman – bass
- Thomas Dolby – keyboards
- Rod Johnson – drums

==== Technical ====
- Richard Goldblatt – engineering

== Live performances and cover versions ==
- A notable interpretation of the melody was released in 1979 by French singer Ringo, using French language lyrics by Étienne Roda-Gil supplying a new title "Qui est ce grand corbeau noir ?" ("Who is this big black raven?") Ringo's version peaked at number 8 in France.
- Ben Folds Five included a studio recording in the 2005 remastered release of 1997's Whatever and Ever Amen, as it was a staple of their live shows.
- The Presidents of the United States of America recorded a cover of the song which appeared on the soundtrack of the 1998 film The Wedding Singer starring Adam Sandler.
- A rare live performance of the song by Horn and Downes came at a ZTT showcase in 1998. This was followed by a performance of the song at a Prince's Trust concert celebrating Horn's 25 years as a record producer on 11 November 2004.
- In November 2006, the Producers played at their first gig in Camden Town. A video clip can be seen on ZTT Records of Horn singing lead vocals and playing bass in a performance of "Video Killed the Radio Star". Tina Charles appears on a YouTube video singing "Slave to the Rhythm" with the Producers and Horn reveals that Charles was the singer and originator of the "Oh Ah-Oh Ah-Oh" part of the song; fellow 5000 Volt member Martin Jay was also a session musician on The Buggles record.
- Robbie Williams performed the song with Trevor Horn at the BBC Electric Proms on 20 October 2009. He also parodied the song's name for his eighth studio album, Reality Killed the Video Star, released that same year and produced by Horn.
- Erasure covered this song as a final track to their Other People's Songs album. Vince Clarke in an interview said that he considers it "the perfect pop song".
- Anne Dudley, composer and co-founding member of The Art of Noise with Trevor Horn, performed the song on solo piano on her album Anne Dudley Plays the Art of Noise.

=== Samples and interpolations ===
- In 2010, Will.i.am of Black Eyed Peas and Nicki Minaj released the single "Check It Out" for the latter's debut studio album, Pink Friday (2010). The song heavily samples "Video Killed the Radio Star". Upon its release, it charted at number 24 on the Billboard Hot 100 in the United States. It also peaked within the top 10 on charts in Belgium and Japan, and was certified Silver in the United Kingdom.
- In 2025, Lil Tecca, released the second and final single to his fifth studio album, Dopamine (2025), entitled "Owa Owa". The song samples "Video Killed the Radio Star" in its chorus, with the song's title referencing the portion used. Upon its release, the single charted at number 50 on the Billboard Hot 100, and peaked within the top 10 on charts in Malta and New Zealand.
- The song's name will be used for the upcoming British horror film Video Killed the Radio Star, which takes place in 1979, the same year the song was recorded and released in.

== In popular culture ==
In February 2002, while on international duty with England, David Beckham became involved in an argument with journalist Rob Shepherd during a press conference after Shepherd made a joke about David and Victoria Beckham's habit of finishing second (David finishing second in the recent FIFA World Player of the Year vote and Victoria's inability to have a Number 1 hit). Beckham sarcastically asked Shepherd, "What do you know about music? How many people in your family have ever had a Number 1?" Shepherd replied, "One. My sister was in The Buggles." His sister was Linda Jardim-Allen, who sang vocals on the song.

In mid-2020, the song became popular among TikTok users as a trend to revisit celebrity death conspiracies, and across the internet when a deepfake of Adolf Hitler and Joseph Stalin singing the song went viral on multiple social media sites.

== See also ==
- Reality Killed the Video Star, a 2009 album by Robbie Williams produced by Trevor Horn
- "Internet Killed the Video Star", a 2010 song by the Limousines
- "Check It Out", a 2010 song by Will.i.am and Nicki Minaj which heavily samples the song.
- "Owa Owa", a 2025 song by Lil Tecca which also heavily samples the song.
- Video Killed the Radio Star (film)

=== No. 1 chart lists ===
- List of number-one singles in Australia during the 1970s
- List of European number-one hits of 1980
- List of number-one singles of 1979 (France)
- List of number-one singles of 1979 (Ireland)
- List of number-one hits of 1980 (Italy)
- List of number-one singles of 1980 (Spain)
- List of number-one singles and albums in Sweden
- List of number-one singles from 1968 to 1979 (Switzerland)
- List of UK Singles Chart number ones of the 1970s
- List of 1970s one-hit wonders in the United States
