= Bruce Woolley =

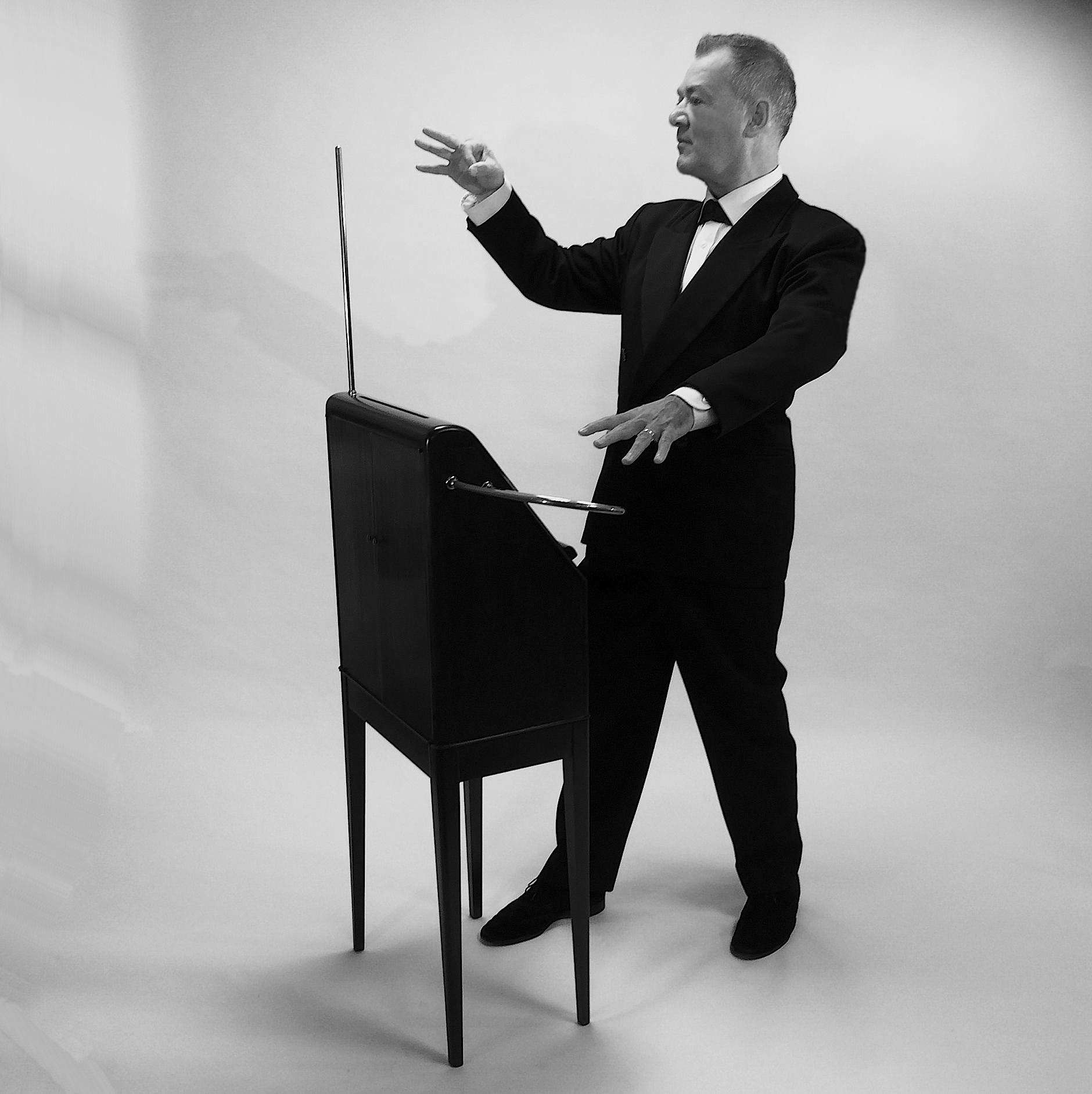
- Woolley with a theremin, London, 2014

Background information
- Born: Bruce Martin Woolley; 11 November 1953 (age 72); Loughborough, England
- Origin: Shepshed, Leicestershire, England
- Genres: New wave; post-punk; power pop; progressive rock
- Occupations: Musician; singer; songwriter; record producer
- Instruments: Vocals; guitar; theremin
- Years active: 1974–present
- Labels: Epic; Island; Gramophone
- Formerly of: The Camera Club, Radio Science Orchestra
- Website: brucewoolleyhq.com radioscienceorchestra.com

Bruce Martin Woolley (born 11 November 1953) is an English musician, singer, songwriter, and record producer. He is best known for his work with the Buggles and Grace Jones, including "Video Killed the Radio Star" and "Slave to the Rhythm", and for the Radio Science Orchestra, of which he is a co-founder.

== Early life ==
Woolley was born in Loughborough, Leicestershire, on 11 November 1953 and educated at Loughborough Grammar School, where he learned electric guitar and where he met his future wife Tessa. He lived in Shepshed, playing the UK pub and club circuit extensively for some years, before landing his first professional engagement in 1974, with Ivor Kenney's Dance Band at Leicester Palais. After a transfer to Derby Tiffany's, Bruce left for London in 1976 to pursue a career in songwriting, after being offered a publishing contract with Everblue Music, in Piccadilly.

== Career ==
=== 1976–1980: The Camera Club ===
Woolley's first hit was "Dancing with Dr Bop" for Australian group the Studs, followed by his first English hit "Baby Blue" for Dusty Springfield, co-written with Trevor Horn and Geoff Downes.

In 1979, Woolley established the new wave music outfit the Camera Club, with Thomas Dolby on keyboards, Matthew Seligman on bass, Dave Birch on guitar and Rod Johnson on drums. Seligman joined the Soft Boys, and was replaced by Re-Flex bassist Nigel Ross-Scott. The Camera Club released their debut and only album English Garden in 1979 and toured the UK and North America. Dolby left the band in 1980 to pursue a solo career, with one final Camera Club track he co-wrote on his debut album. They disbanded in 1983 after two years largely spent on the road, and following disagreements with CBS Records, which refused to release their second album, which was eventually released in October 2024 on a compilation of unreleased material, some of which had never seen the light of day for over 40 years.

In 1978, Woolley co-wrote "Video Killed the Radio Star", together with Horn and Downes, who later became the Buggles. Bruce Woolley and the Camera Club recorded and broadcast their own version of the song before the Buggles released their version in 1979, but it was not a hit. It reached number 18 for two weeks on Canada's CHUM Chart, May 19 and 26, 1980.

"Video Killed the Radio Star" was nominated for an Ivor Novello Award.

=== 1981–1994: Production and songwriting ===
In 1981, Woolley and Trevor Horn co-wrote and produced "Hand Held in Black and White" and "Mirror Mirror" for Dollar. In 1983, Magnus Uggla recorded a cover of the Camera Club's 1981 single "Blue Blue (Victoria)" with new (i.e. not a translation of Woolley's) lyrics in Swedish.

In 1985, Woolley co-wrote Grace Jones' Slave to the Rhythm. The title track was originally intended for Frankie Goes to Hollywood, but Island Records' founder, Chris Blackwell, suggested using the song for Jones. The album took nearly a year to produce and made pioneering use of the Synclavier system.

In 1986, Woolley and Grace Jones co-wrote and produced Jones' eighth studio album Inside Story with Nile Rodgers, which spawned the single "I'm Not Perfect (But I'm Perfect for You)". During production of the music video for this track, Woolley spent time with Andy Warhol, Timothy Leary and also Keith Haring, who were collectively responsible for set design. The song received an ASCAP Award for Black Music in 1987, presented to Woolley by Cab Calloway.

In 1989, Woolley's work was sampled for the ambient piece "A Huge Ever Growing Pulsating Brain That Rules from the Centre of the Ultraworld" by the Orb. The track featured vocals by Woolley and Trevor Horn taken from Slave to the Rhythm.

Woolley's songs have been covered by John Farnham ("Two Strong Hearts"), Shirley Bassey ("Slave to the Rhythm" on 2007's Get the Party Started), the Feeling, Divine, Cliff Richard, Tori Amos, Donna Summer, Tom Jones, Cher ("Love Is the Groove" on 1998's Believe album), and Bebel Gilberto.

=== 1994–present: The Radio Science Orchestra and recent history ===
==== The Radio Science Orchestra ====
In 1994, Woolley, Matthew Seligman, Chris Elliott and Andy Visser founded The Radio Science Orchestra (RSO), a theremin-led space age pop ensemble inspired by the birth of electronic music. The ensemble has recorded for film, television and radio, and provides bespoke arrangements and audio-visual performances combining live music, archive footage and narration.

In 1996, the RSO released a début EP, Memories of the Future. In 1997, together with Grace Jones, the RSO provided the title track "Storm" for The Avengers movie starring Sean Connery, Uma Thurman and Ralph Fiennes. In 1999, the RSO released a follow-up EP, Reverb. The RSO created a live score Ray Santilli's Alien Autopsy, an interactive soundtrack for Superstructure With Satellites at the Tate Gallery. In 2002, the RSO performed at Shanghai's International Pop Festival. The same year, Grace Jones and Luciano Pavarotti performed the RSO's arrangement of "Pourquoi me Reveiller". In 2003, the RSO scored Alien Invasion, a three-minute viral commercial for Greenpeace.

In 2004, the ensemble provided music for the "Electric Storm" installation at London's South Bank for Shell. This featured a 24-hour soundtrack with forty loudspeakers, lights, music and artificial fog created from water which was pumped from the Thames. All the power for the show was derived from a huge wind turbine, specially installed alongside the Waterloo footbridge.

In 2009, the RSO performed at TED Global with Thomas Dolby. In 2006, the RSO played with Thomas Dolby at London's ICA. In 2017, the RSO and Polly Scattergood released "Video Killed the Radio Star (Darkstar)", remixed by Steve Dub of the Chemical Brothers, and used as the soundtrack for trailers for the MTV Music Video Awards, featuring Katy Perry.

In 2019, the RSO presented "Music out of the Moon" at Bluedot Festival (Jodrell Bank Observatory), and TED Summit, Edinburgh. The performances celebrated the anniversary of Apollo 11, and included reconstructed tracks for theremin and jazz band from Harry Revel and Les Baxter's 1947 record Music Out of the Moon, played from space by Neil Armstrong in 1969.

The RSO has appeared on MTV, EBN, BBC 1, BBC 2, BBC World Service Television News, ITV, Channel 1, Channel 4, Radio 2, (including the Chris Evans Drivetime show in February 2008), Radio 3, Radio 4 and at Glastonbury Festival.

Bruce appeared with the Radio Science Orchestra at Leicester National Space Centre in November 2023.

==== Songwriting and production ====
In 2006, Woolley wrote and co-produced tracks for Grace Jones's album Hurricane, together with Brian Eno, Ivor Guest (Bomb the Bass), Pamelia Kurstin, and Sly and Robbie.

On 28 September 2010, Woolley joined Geoff Downes and Trevor Horn for the Buggles' 'live début', to raise funds for the Royal Hospital for Neuro-disability.

In 2004, Woolley performed for a Prince's Trust concert at Wembley Arena celebrating Horn's production career and 25 years of "Video Killed the Radio Star".

Woolley performed the theremin on Thomas Dolby's song "Simone", which was released on Dolby's Oceanea EP in November 2010, and subsequently on the studio album A Map of the Floating City in October 2011.

On 4 October 2011, Woolley received a Gold Medal Award from the BMI in recognition of airplay for "Check It Out", a track by Nicki Minaj and will.i.am, which featured on Minaj's US number 1 album "Pink Friday" which sampled "Video Killed the Radio Star".

In 2018, Woolley sang backing vocals on Trevor Horn's debut album. Woolley sings with Rumer on her version of "Slave to the Rhythm". Trevor Horn Reimagines the Eighties entered the UK Independent Album chart at No. 1 in February 2019.

== Personal life ==
Woolley lives in Surrey, England. His wife, Tessa, died in February 2023. They have three sons.
