= Kirsten Joy =

English musician

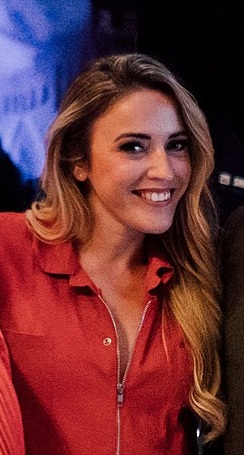
- Joy in 2019

Background information
- Born: Kirsten Joy Gill
- Genre: Pop
- Occupation: Singer-songwriter
- Instrument: Vocals
- Years active: 2006–present
- Member of: Clean Bandit
- Website: www.kirstenjoy.com

Kirsten Joy Child (né Gill) is an English singer-songwriter who is a touring member of the band Clean Bandit. Having been chosen by judge Jessie J in the programme's 'blind auditions' round, Joy joined other contestants on Jessie's team to compete for a place in the finals. During the 'battle rounds' Joy lost out to fellow contestant Toni Warne.

== Music career ==
Music featured throughout Joy's school life through plays, assemblies local concerts, including in Rochester Cathedral, singing at church at taking part in local talent competitions. She was a contestant in a "Star4Medway", a local talent competition promoted by the Mayor of Medway. This led to the opportunity for Joy to sing one of her own songs opening on the main stage at the Kent Music Festival at Port Lympne in 2005, where acts included Girls Aloud and Lemar.

Before starting out as a session singer, Joy performed as a member of the ACM Gospel Choir in 2006 at the Academy of Contemporary Music (ACM), a music academy located in Guildford. Joy, Mark De-Lisser and other ACM students featured on the BBC's talent-themed television show Last Choir Standing in 2008. The ACM Gospel Choir reached the finals of the show.

An article for Kentonline reported that Kirsten had "shared a stage with Gary Barlow, supported Girls Aloud and has sung in front of the Queen". She has also worked with Producers.

She was a member of the British national jury in the Eurovision Song Contest 2012.

In 2012, the UK version of The Voice was broadcast on BBC television and Joy took part as a solo contestant. She succeeded in the 'blind audition' round in attracting the attention of Jessie J and joined Jessie's team to compete against other teams for judges Tom Jones, Will.i.am and Danny O'Donoghue. At the 'battle round' stages, Joy was eliminated in favour of contestant Toni Warne.

=== The Voice UK performances and results ===
Theme	Song performed	Original artist	Result
Blind audition	"Heaven"	Emeli Sandé	Picked for Team Jessie
Battle Rounds	"Think"	James Brown	Eliminated

=== Music releases ===
Kirsten released her debut EP Written in the Sky in February 2013. It was produced by Ben Collier and Nari Man.

=== EP 'Written in the Sky', 2013 ===
No.	Title	Length
1.	"Written in the Sky"	3:58
2.	"Remembered"	3:47
3.	"Castles"	3:41
4.	"Good News"	4:11
5.	"The Wolves"	4:19

She attempted to represent Switzerland at the Eurovision Song Contest 2015 with the song "One Life". However, the song failed to reach the final.

== Clean Bandit ==
Since 2016, Joy has been a touring member of Clean Bandit. She has also recorded with the group. In 2018, it was announced that Joy would be a featuring artist on one of the band's new songs on their second studio album, What is Love?, featuring on "We Were Just Kids" with Craig David.
