= Last Triumph =

Artist management and booking agency

- Founder: JR Hadaway; Nick Morris
- Country of origin: United States
- Location: Minneapolis, Minnesota
- Official website: LastTriumph.com

Last Triumph is an artist management and booking agency based in Minneapolis, Minnesota. It also became the world's first B Corporation certified artist management and booking agency in November 2014.

== Company history ==
In 2014, Jarod Hadaway, (founder of Last Triumph), was responsible for the launch Createch Studio, based in Arlington Hills area of Saint Paul, Minnesota. It was founded as a community recording studio with the city of Saint Paul to allow young people in the Arlington Hills community to schedule studio time to create and record music. Partnering with the MacArthur Foundation, Createch received a $100,000 grant for the project. During the same year, music produced by the label was featured on Oxygen TV.

In late 2014, the label became the world's first B Corporation certified record label.

Last Triumph announced that they would again be hosting The Take Off Tour at SXSW.

== Artist roster ==
- Yatao
- Reina del Cid
- Joshua Lee Turner
- The Other Favorites
- Carson McKee
- Nooky Jones
- No Tent
