= Made in Basing Street =

Studio album by Producers
- Released: 25 June 2012
- Recorded: 2006–2012
- Genres: Synthpop; new wave; rock; progressive rock
- Length: 47:54
- Label: Last Records
- Producers: Chris Braide; Lol Creme; Trevor Horn; Steve Lipson; Ash Soan

Professional ratings
Review scores
Source	Rating
Prog	3.5/5 stars
Classic Rock	3.5/5 stars
Financial Times	3/5 stars
The Independent	positive

Made in Basing Street is the first album by the English supergroup Producers (later known as The Trevor Horn Band), released on 25 June 2012. As the album's name suggests, it was mainly recorded at the legendary SARM Studios (formerly known as 'Basing Street Studios') in Notting Hill, which is now owned by producer and Producers member Trevor Horn, and was used to record such famous albums as Led Zeppelin IV and Queen's News of the World.

The album songs feature different lead vocals, including Trevor Horn, Ryan Molloy, Chris Braide, Lol Creme and Stephen Lipson.

The album's cover features a QR code which, when decoded, links to the former location of the band's now-defunct official website.

== History ==
Producers was formed in 2006 as a live act, allowing its members to play songs from their vast histories as record producers. They also wrote some new songs together (such as "Freeway" and "Barking Up the Right Tree") which they added to their live sets, before deciding to produce their own album. The album was originally announced as early as 2007 under the name Studio 1, when "Barking Up the Right Tree" was released as a single with "Freeway" as a B-side on the Stiff Records label. It was later renamed "Watching You Out There" (the name of a song which appears on the final product). At one point, following Chris Braide's departure when the band briefly went by the name 'US', the band had planned a concept album entitled The Path of Sydney Arthur, which would have told the story of a man born on the same day as the 1969 Moon landing. Made in Basing Street is the final product of these six years' work by the band. Though Chris Braide was no longer a member of the band by the time the album was completed, he receives writing and production credits on every track. Besides the album version of "Freeway" featuring vocals from Braide and Molloy, there is an earlier version with only Braide as the vocalist.

== Recording ==
Trevor Horn, Lol Creme and Stephen Lipson in an interview with Neil McCormick of The Daily Telegraph stated it "was very old school", "just got together and started recording, and everyone was happy with what everyone else did".

== Reception ==
Prog 3.5/5 review, highlighting songs "Freeway" and "Garden Of Flowers", concluded that "aside from a couple of inconsequential though innocuous enough pot-boilers, Made In Basing Street, maps out an agreeably expansive space between memorable, classic pop, and prog-inclined AOR vistas. An eloquent celebration of good old-fashioned songwriting". Classic Rock 3.5/5 review stated that "forestalling ‘the cabaret has taken over’ refrain on "Watching You Out There", Made In Basing Street is polished-to-perfection elegance. And although it lacks the central character that a lead singer might lend, the show of excellence is undeniable".

Financial Times 3/5 review considered it "an album that sounds like a time capsule from the charts circa 1985, complete with an ingratiating ballad ("Man on the Moon"), a song set in the Caribbean ("Every Single Night in Jamaica") and a series of infectiously upbeat numbers like the paean to driving ("Freeway") with which the album opens". The Independent positive review considered it "an album of classy, mature, lush 1970s-flavoured pop-rock. It won't change the rules of music. But hearing people doing what they do, and doing it well, is never a chore".

== Track listing ==
All tracks written by Chris Braide, Lol Creme, Trevor Horn, Steve Lipson and Ash Soan.

No.	Title	Length
1.	"Freeway"	5:14
2.	"Waiting For the Right Time"	4:15
3.	"Your Life"	6:26
4.	"Man on the Moon"	4:02
5.	"Every Single Night in Jamaica"	5:16
6.	"Stay Elaine"	3:44
7.	"Barking Up the Right Tree"	3:21
8.	"Garden of Flowers"	4:14
9.	"Watching You Out There"	5:35
10.	"You & I"	5:47

Disc two - Deluxe Edition
No.	Title	Length
1.	"Your Life" (Extended)	7:40
2.	"Garden Of Flowers" (Alternative)	5:53
3.	"Seven"	3:50
4.	"There's Only So Much You Can Do"	3:29
5.	"Freeway" (Extended)	6:46
6.	"Two Tribes" (hidden track)	4:50

== 2024 re-release ==
A 5CD version was released by Cherry Red in July 2024 under the name Producers. This includes a 2023 mix of the album, instrumentals and additional previously unreleased songs.

Disc three - Made in Basing Street: Alternative Version
No.	Title	Length
1.	"Freeway"
2.	"Waiting For the Right Time"
3.	"Your Life"
4.	"Man On the Moon"
5.	"Every Single Night in Jamaica"
6.	"Stay Elaine"
7.	"Barking Up the Right Tree"
8.	"Garden Of Flowers"
9.	"Watching You Out There"
10.	"You And I"

Disc four - Outtakes
No.	Title	Length
1.	"Broadway"
2.	"Come In Elektra"
3.	"Give Us a Clue"
4.	"Home"
5.	"Looking For Love"
6.	"Looking For Love"
7.	"Music For Bel Air"
8.	"Summer Rain"
9.	"The Path of Shaky Arthur"
10.	"There’s Only So Much You Can Do"
11.	"You And I – Dada Mix"
12.	"Your Life – End Intro Idea"

Disc five - Instrumentals
No.	Title	Length
1.	"Freeway"
2.	"Waiting For the Right Time"
3.	"Your Life"
4.	"Man On the Moon"
5.	"Stay Elaine"
6.	"Barking Up the Right Tree"
7.	"Garden Of Flowers"
8.	"Watching You Out There"
9.	"You And I"

== Personnel ==
- Lol Creme – guitars, marimba, bass, backing vocals, lead vocals (7), keyboards, percussion
- Ash Soan – drums, percussion; acoustic guitar (7)
- Stephen Lipson – guitars, mandolin, percussion, programming; backing vocals (1); bass (4); vocals (7)
- Trevor Horn – bass, backing vocals; lead vocals (3,5,8); acoustic guitar (3); vocoder (5); marimba (8)
- Chris Braide – vocals, keyboards; acoustic guitar (1, 2); glockenspiel (3)
- Ryan Molloy – vocals (1, 4, 6); backing vocals (2, 3)
- Geoff Downes – organ, keyboards, Rhodes, piano
- Luís Jardim – percussion (3, 7)
- Simon Bloor – glockenspiel (8)
- Kirsten Joy – backing vocals (1)
- Kate Westall – backing vocals (1)
- Lucy Monaghan – "giggle girl" (6)

== Charts ==
2012 chart performance for Made in Basing Street
Chart (2012)	Peak position
UK Independent Albums (Official Charts)	26

2026 chart performance for Made in Basing Street
Chart (2026)	Peak position
Scottish Albums (Official Charts)	44
UK Albums Sales (Official Charts)	55
UK Independent Albums (Official Charts)	21
