= City of Bath Male Choir =

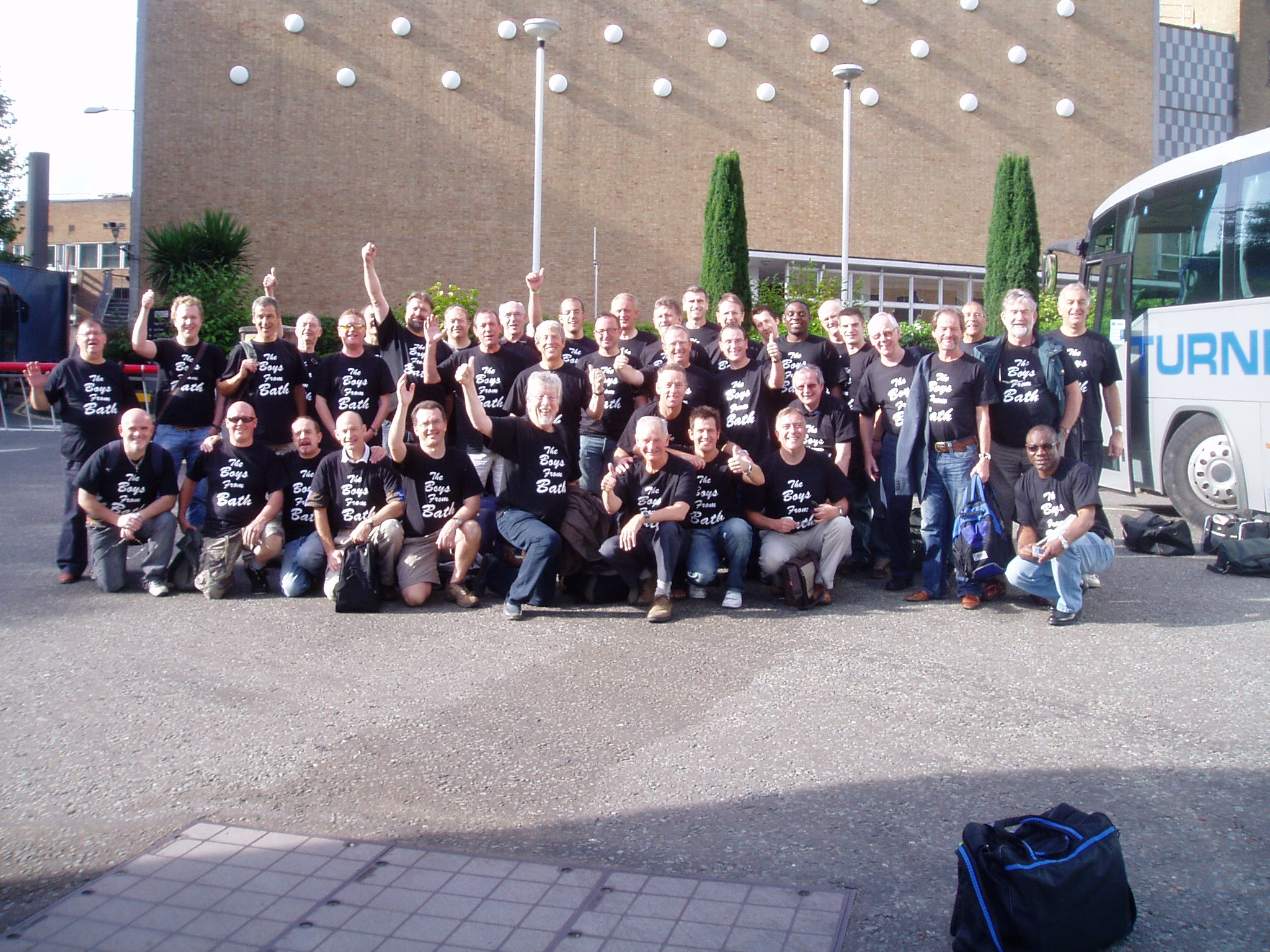
The Bath Male Choir at the BBC 9 August 2008

The City of Bath Male Choir is a male voice choir from Bath, Somerset. They came to national prominence in the United Kingdom after finishing 5th in the BBC television show Last Choir Standing during July and August 2008. They have since performed with many other choirs, bands and celebrities in the UK and overseas, and have participated significantly in charity fundraising projects.

== Early career ==
The amateur choir was formed in January 2006 by Grenville Jones. 15 singers attended the first rehearsal, and its first concert was held in the Bath Guildhall in November 2006. The choir then appeared at the 2007 Bath Showcase charity concert in front of an audience of 1,500 people, with guest appearances from jazz singers Clare Teal and Jamie Cullum.

In July 2007 the choir performed with Aled Jones. They also performed in Germany in the same year, and played a second concert at the Guildhall in early November 2007. Since then, the choir has performed around the UK, Europe, North America and Asia.

The choir's patron is the Mayor of Bath. In June 2008, Mayor Tim Ball joined the choir on a tour to Bath's Dutch twin city of Alkmaar and in 2009 the choir sang at the Mayor of Bath's Call to Prayer in the Guildhall.

For his work establishing the choir and the charity Golden Oldies, Grenville Jones was named the Mayor of Bath's Citizen of the Year in April 2009, and in 2012 was awarded an Honorary Doctorate from Bath Spa University.

== Last Choir Standing ==
In 2008, Jones put forward the choir for a new BBC series, Last Choir Standing, and they were announced as one of the 15 participating choirs on 14 July 2008. The choir went on to reach the last five in the competition.

In August 2008, following the broadcast of the show, the choir sang at a Bath and North East Somerset Council civic reception for the UK School Games. They subsequently performed approximately once a month throughout south-west England, including a tour of Cornwall in September 2009 that included the Stert Theatre, the Eden Project, and Truro Methodist Church.

In December 2009 and February 2010 the choir also sang for two national charity events: on 11 December 2010 at a concert for The Prostate Cancer Society in St. John's Church, Smiths' Square, Westminster and 27 February at Wells Cathedral Wells Cathedral for the Help for Heroes charity. On 7 March 2010, 40 members of the choir ran for charity in the Bath Half Marathon, raising just over £14,000 for the Prostate Cancer Charity and Jones's Golden Oldies Charitable Trust. In December 2010, the choir sang at Bath Abbey for the National Osteoporosis Society with Camilla, Duchess of Cornwall.

== Performances and tours ==
The Bath Male Choir has performed joint concerts with choirs including the Treorchy Male Voice Choir and the Morriston Orpheus Male Voice Choir and with two choirs from Last Choir Standing: the ACM Gospel Choir at the Bath Forum on 11 July 2009, and with the Belfast Open Arts Community Choir on 24 April 2010 at the Bangor International Choral Festival in Northern Ireland. They have also performed alongside the Royal Marines Band and the RAF Central Band, and singers including Alfie Boe and Rhiannon Lambert, Aled Jones, Lee Mead, and Clive Anderson. Grenville Jones is closely associated with the Welsh male choir leader Alwyn Humphries, who is a trustee of the Goldies Cymru Charity, and also writes arrangements for the Bath Male Choir.

Since their first overseas tour to Germany in 2007, the Bath Male Choir has toured in the Netherlands, France, Belgium, Canada, USA and Japan. They sang at the 16th Annual Bacchus Choir Festival in Itami, Japan, on 3 November 2014, the last of over 50 choirs taking part in the one-day event, with over 1,500 people in audience.

== Personnel ==
The choir has had two accompanists: Philip Évry, from the choir's foundation in 2006 until 2015, and Philip Ridgers from 2016 until July 2022. Grenville's son, Laurie Jones, who was a founding member of the choir, re-joined as Deputy Conductor in 2020. Laurie Jones runs the Malmesbury Community Choir and is also Assistant Musical Director for the Bath Welcome Chorus Choir, which is also run by Grenville Jones.
