= The Queen's Award for Enterprise: Innovation (Technology) (2008) =

The Queen's Award for Enterprise: Innovation (Technology) (2008) was awarded on 21 April 2008, by Queen Elizabeth II.

== Recipients ==
The following organisations were awarded this year.

- 4fx Healthcare Ltd of Mansfield, Nottinghamshire for baby nose-clear infant nasal aspirator.
- Academy of Contemporary Music Ltd of Guildford, Surrey for industry led music education.
- Activa Healthcare Ltd of Needwood, Burton-upon-Trent for leg ulcer and chronic oedema management.
- Aqualisa Products Limited of Westerham, Kent for digital showers using electronic control.
- Audio Network PLC of Halstead, Essex for production music and sound effects library service.
- Bernhard and Company Ltd of Rugby, Warwickshire The Express Dual and for the Anglemaster system for sharpening grass cutting blades.
- Callitech Limited (trading as Moneypenny) of Wrexham, Wales for business telephone answering and outsourced reception services
- Cattle Information Services of Rickmansworth, Hertfordshire for ‘Your Herd’ – a web-based programme of dairy herd management tools
- Checkmate UK Ltd of Melksham, Wiltshire for pneumatic dunnage to restrain marine cargoes.
- Diamond Consulting Services Ltd of Aylesbury, Buckinghamshire for ‘Idris’ vehicle detection products.
- DuPont Teijin Films UK Ltd of Middlesbrough for melinex polyester films.
- Eurobuns Ltd of Kingston, Milton Keynes, Buckinghamshire for manufacture and supply of frozen breads to the UK food service and retail food industry.
- Focusrite Audio Engineering Limited of High Wycombe, Buckinghamshire for ReMote SL with AutoMap – hardware control of music-making software.
- Greenbank Terotech Ltd of Swadlincote, Derbyshire for optimisation technology for large coal fired combustion plants.
- Healix Risk Rating Limited of Hampton, Middlesex for medical risk assessment system.
- I’Anson Bros Ltd (trading as British Horse Feeds) of Ripon, North Yorkshire for Speedi-Beet - a quick soaking sugar beet flake for horses and ponies.
- Image Processing Techniques Limited of Basingstoke, Hampshire for OmniTek XR purpose-built analyzer for digital cinema applications.
- KP Technology Ltd of Wick, Caithness, Scotland for the Kelvin probe - vibrating capacitor device for work function and surface potential measurements.
- Keela International Ltd of Glenrothes, Fife, Scotland System Dual for protection for extreme weather garments.
- Keepsake Card Craft (2004) Ltd of Oldbury, West Midlands for embossing boards with patented channels.
- KeyMed (Medical & Industrial Equipment) Ltd of Southend-on-Sea, Essex for i-SPEED high speed video camera.
- Land Rover of Gaydon, Warwickshire for Terrain Response - vehicle traction system.
- Leach Colour Ltd of Huddersfield, for STIK - the magnetic graphic display system.
- West Yorkshire liftshare.com Ltd of Attleborough, Norfolk On-line journey matching system to facilitate car sharing.
- Metryx Ltd of Nailsea, Bristol for mass metrology for semiconductor manufacturing processes.
- Owen Mumford Ltd of Woodstock, Oxfordshire for Unistik 3 safety lancets for blood sampling in hospitals and by patients at home.
- NMI Safety Systems Ltd of London N17 ‘Magic for seats’ wheelchair securement system.
- OneClick Technologies Ltd of Annesley, Nottingham for intelliPlug, intelligent energy saving mains adaptor.
- Ovation Systems Ltd of Thame, Oxfordshire for AfterBurner a 24-hour time lapse hard disk for DVD video recorder.
- Picsel Technologies Limited of Glasgow, Scotland for EPAGE: a graphics engine for mobile devices.
- Sohnar Limited of London W6 Traffic - a software programme to manage all aspects of a business in the creative sector.
- Speed-trap.com Limited (trading as Speed-Trap) of Newbury, Berkshire for software that delivers complete on-line customer insight.
- SunGard Public Sector Limited of Chippenham, Wiltshire for SunGard dS2000 – radio and telecommunications solution to enable a rapid response by emergency service organisations.
- Super Rod Ltd of Blaenavon, Pontypool, Wales for custom designed fibre-glass rods for installing electric cables.
- Syfer Technology Ltd of Arminghall, Norwich, Norfolk for flexicap, a novel termination of multilayer capacitors to prevent failure modes in electronic circuits.
- Symbian Ltd of London SE1 for the Symbian OS - advanced, open, standard operating system for data-enabled mobile phones.
- Thermoteknix Systems Ltd of Waterbeach, Cambridge for MIRICLE range of high performance ultra miniature ruggedised thermal imaging cameras.
- Thomson Scientific Limited of London EC1 THOMSON for pharma - online information for drug development.
- Titan Steel Wheels Ltd of Kidderminster, Three piece integrated flange wheel - for iF series.
- Transmille Ltd of Tonbridge, Kent for development of calibrator design and calibration systems.
- TrichoTech Limited of Cardiff, Wales for analysis of biological samples for substance misuse.
- Trinity Integrated Systems Ltd of Sale, Cheshire 100% migration of legacy safety PLC ladder logic to industry standard IEC-61131 function block code
