= ACM Gospel Choir =

British gospel choir

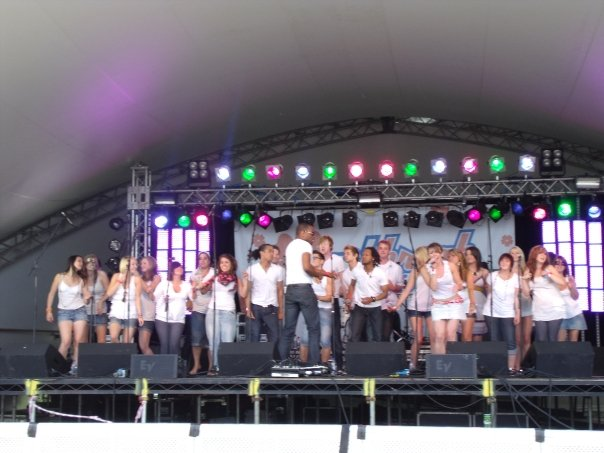
- The choir performing at Beach Break, in 2009.

Background information
- Origin: Surrey, United Kingdom
- Genres: Gospel, Pop, Rock, Soul, Jazz
- Years active: 2005 – Present
- Labels: Vision 28 Ltd
- Members: Shannon Bedford, Em Bollon, Seonaid Bowers, Joanna Breheny, Mariatu Conteh, Mark De-Lisser (Leader), Rishi Dhir, Amy Eftekhari, Kirsten Joy Gill, Lauren Gill, Clare Haggarty, Natasha Hubah, Joe Jacquest, Simone Kaye, Emily Lambros, Cat Lowe, Georgia Mason, Laura Miller, Tonye Minadiri-Brown, Sel Omer, Holly Petrie, Tom Pybus, Sara Robalo, Toni Robinson, Freyja Sculpher, Kirsty Sutton, Adam Wallis, Zion Desta Wilson, Aleksandra Zembron
- Past members: Jenny Gibbons, Christine Gudgin, Joanna Magnay, Fliss Nunn, Natalie Palmer, Rachel Alderson, Rikki Ancell, James Craise, Charlotte Hamson, Natalie Hamson, Rhianna Hills, Paul Humphries, Suraiya Khares, Ed Whicher,
- Website: www.acmgospelchoir.com

The ACM Gospel Choir is a British gospel choir made up of students of the Academy of Contemporary Music. The group first came to public attention in the summer of 2008 when they gained 4th place in BBC One's Saturday night show Last Choir Standing. Shortly after leaving the show the choir released their first album.

== History ==
=== Formation and early years ===
The choir was created by Mark De-Lisser and Nic Rowley at the Academy of Contemporary Music in 2005 as an extra-curricular activity. During the first 3 years the choir rehearsed and performed some gigs in and around the Guildford area.

=== Last Choir Standing (2008) ===
In 2008 the choir entered the BBC One competition Last Choir Standing where they reached the semi-finals. During the competition, the group received praise from both the public and the judges. Suzi Digby said "I wish the people at home could have been sitting where I'm sitting, because I can feel the electricity. It's unbelievable", whilst Russell Watson described them as his favourite choir on the show.

After leaving the show in the semi-finals, the group was invited back for the final to accompany Russell Watson in his performance of Stevie Wonder's Heaven Help Us All.

=== 2008 ===
Since Last Choir Standing the choir played many shows all over the UK, and had a few high-profile appearances. In September they released their self-titled debut album on 1 Records Worldwide. They also sang with Russell Watson on BBC's Proms in the Park in Salford.

=== 2009 ===
In May 2009 and 2010 the group sang at the Windsor Castle Royal Tattoo for Her Majesty the Queen and other members of the royal family. In June 2009, the choir was a guest on the BBC Radio 2 show Beverley's Gospel Nights hosted by gospel singer Beverley Knight. Later in the summer they sang at the Carnegie Challenge Cup at Wembley Stadium supporting Hayley Westenra in the rendition of Abide With Me and the British national anthem, God Save the Queen. They also performed at the Spirit of London Awards ceremony with Robbie Craig and Ashley Walters. The ceremony was hosted by Lemar, who also performed and Brook Kinsella. Other artists on the night included Alexandra Burke, Diversity and Miss Frank. Guest at the ceremony included Michael Caine, Boris Johnson, JLS and Jocelyn Jee Esien.

In October 2009 the choir recorded 'Let me know' with Gabriella Cilmi for her album Ten.

=== 2010 ===
In February 2010 The choir were involved in ITV1's prime time show Ultimate Movie Toons, a celebration of songs from animated movies throughout the years. The choir supported Michael Ball on the number one song The Bare Necessities from The Jungle Book. Hosted by Dannii Minogue and featuring, Pixie Lott, Denise van Outen, Duncan James, Katherine Jenkins, Mika, Craig David, Beverley Knight, and Flawless.

In April 2010 the choir recorded a remake of Three Lions by the squad for the 2010 FIFA World Cup with Robbie Williams and Russell Brand. They also recorded the world cup opening theme song, Hope with Nelson Mandela and Siphiwo Ntshebe who died before the opening ceremony of the 2010 FIFA World Cup where he was supposed to sing the song. During the same month the choir recorded 'A Million More Years' with Olly Murs for his debut album 'Olly Murs' released November 2010. All these recordings were done at Sarm Studios, London with producer Trevor Horn.

In September 2010 the choir recorded an album track for 'Coronation Street 50 Years' a musical put together to celebrate 50 years of the iconic television soap opera Coronation Street. This recording took place at the world-famous Abbey Road Studios.

In November 2010 the choir performed again at the Spirit of London Awards. On this occasion they opened the show with the SOLA theme song 'Streets of London' and backed Alexandra Burke on her acoustic rendition of 'Hallelujah'. Other notable attendees on the night were, Noel Clarke, Boris Johnson, Labrinth, Flawless, Christine Ohuruogu and Barbara Windsor.

In December 2010 the choir appeared on the Christmas Episode (Let It Snow) of the ZingZillas, a television programme aimed at young children, broadcast on the BBC pre-school channel CBeebies. They sang an arrangement of Stille Nacht (Silent Night), arranged by Mark De-Lisser.

They were also invited to sing for the London 2012 Olympic Stadium lights switch-on ceremony, a star-studded event where the choir entertained celebrities such as London Mayor Boris Johnson, British Prime Minister David Cameron, Lord Sebastian Coe, former Olympic, Commonwealth, European and World champion, Jonathan Edwards, former British javelin thrower and heptathlete Tessa Sanderson and many more.

=== 2011 ===
In November 2011 the choir performed again at the Spirit of London Awards at The Royal Albert Hall. On this occasion they opened the show with the SOLA theme song 'Streets of London' with Alexa Goddard. Other notable attendees on the night were, Noel Clarke, Boris Johnson, Labrinth, Flawless, Christine Ohuruogu and Barbara Windsor.

=== 2012 ===
In August 2012 the choir were asked to perform with the band Scouting for Girls for BBC Radio 1's Live Lounge 2012. The band covered "Wings" by Little Mix and the choir provided the background vocals. The cover featured on the compilation album for the show. The choir also performed at the London 2012 Queen Elizabeth Olympic Park throughout the Olympics for the general public.

=== 2013 ===
2013 saw the choir return to the studio to record a collection of negro spirituals for their 3rd album entitled #thespirituals. The album was recorded after a journey of discovery was completed by the singers into the transatlantic slave trade. This newly found knowledge was used as the basis for album sensing the major life struggle of those who were enslaved.

The album was launched in London at the Regent Hall, 275 Oxford Street on 23 August 2013 to mark the International Day for the Remembrance of the Slave Trade and its Abolition designated by UNESCO.

The choir were nominated for Best Event Act of the year at this years Event Awards in London. The choir will perform at the event on 4 October 2013.

The choir were nominated for the Praisetek Gospel Music Award which takes place at the Round Chapel on 2 November.

=== 2014 ===
2014 saw the choir conduct a mini tour in Poland in November.

The choir won the Best Gospel Act 2014 at the Urban Music Awards on 15 November.

The choir also attempted and set a new Guinness World Record in December for the Highest Carol Concert on a plane. This was achieved in partnership with EasyJet.

=== 2015 ===
2015 has seen the choir continue to perform throughout the UK and Europe. In April they took part in Sing Out! Sunday as the host choir. A celebration of choral singing with over 700 singers performing.

== Discography ==
Title	Release date	Info
ACM Gospel Choir	September 2008	Self-titled debut album
Last Choir Standing Album	November 2008	Featured artist: "September"; "Joyful Joyful"
Oh Holy Night (Single)	December 2008	Digital Only
Christmas with the Choir	December 2008	2nd album – Released with the Mail on Sunday on 14/12/08
Hallelujah	April 2009	Featured artist: "Joyful Joyful"
#thespirituals	August 2013	3rd album – A collection of negro spirituals

== Book releases ==
In 2010 two collections of popular songs arranged by Mark De-Lisser, and sung by ACM Gospel Choir, were released by Novello Music Sales Group. The books were titled "Sing Out! Five Pop Songs for Today's Choirs", books 1, 2, 3, 4, 5, Christmas and The Spirituals.
