= Joshua Turner =

Joshua Turner may refer to:

- Joshua Lee Turner (fl. 2000s–2010s), American singer-songwriter
- Joshua Evans Turner (born 1992), American rapper better known by his stage name, Dem Atlas
- Joshua Otis "Josh" Turner (born 1977), American country and gospel singer
- Joshuaturner, a minor planet named for American astronomer Joshua Robert Turner

== See also ==
- Josh Turner (rugby union) (born 1995), professional rugby union player
