= Mary Spender =

British musician and YouTube personality

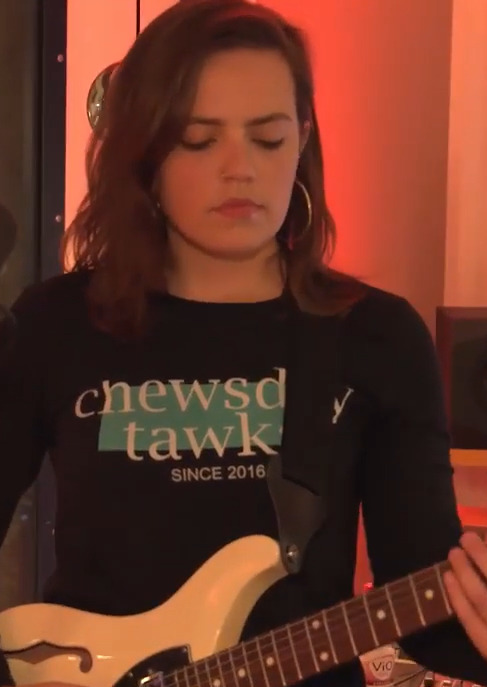
- Spender in 2018
- Born: June or July 1990; Rinteln, West Germany
- Education: University of Bristol
- Occupations: Singer-songwriter; YouTuber

YouTube information
- Channel: Mary Spender
- Genre: Music
- Subscribers: 799 thousand
- Views: 112 million
- Last updated: 15 September 2026
- Website: maryspender.com

Mary Harriet Edwina Spender (born June or July 1990) is a British singer-songwriter, guitarist, and YouTube personality.

== Biography ==
Spender was born at the British Military Hospital in Rinteln, Germany, the daughter of a British Army officer. She studied classical music at the University of Bristol, including playing the viola and classical singing.

Spender writes and performs original songs. Her guitar style has been described as "crisp" with a "harmonically rich, percussive style" and her songwriting as "confessional" and "sultry". Her music has been broadcast on various radio stations including BBC Radio.

Her YouTube channel is themed on music and music technology. It has included interviews with guitarists KT Tunstall, Jen Majura, James Valentine, Devin Townsend, Kaki King, Elle Cordova (known at the time as Reina del Cid), Josh Turner, Molly Tuttle, Earl Slick and Tomo Fujita. She has also appeared on other YouTube channels such as Rob Scallon, Andertons, Adam Neely, and Rick Beato. She also made a guest appearance on the quiz show Lateral. She voices Mary in the cartoon movie Pastacolypse.

Spender wrote and produced a feature-length documentary entitled The Dire Straits Story. It was released on 6 April 2025 exclusively on Nebula streaming service. John Illsley is interviewed extensively and covers the band's full career.

In July 2026 she commented on the controversy surrounding Fender's litigation against other guitar manufacturers on her YouTube channel.
