= Burns London =

Former English guitar manufacturer

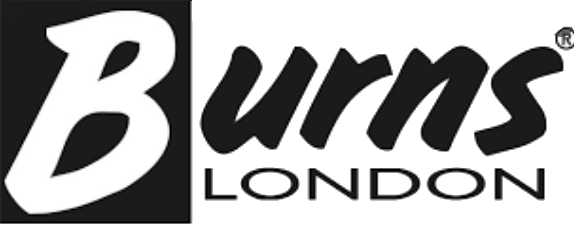
- Type: Private
- Industry: Musical instrument
- Founded: 1959; 67 years ago
- Founder: James Ormston Burns and Alice Louise Farrell
- Headquarters: London, England
- Area served: Formerly Worldwide
- Products: Formerly Electric guitars Electric Bass guitars
- Owner: Terry Hope, Lee Anderton, Peter Anderton, Graham Bell, Christopher McBay
- Website: burnsguitars.com

Burns London was an English manufacturer of electric guitars and bass guitars. Originally established as Ormston Burns Ltd in 1959, it underwent several changes in ownership and branding over the following decades before its assets were acquired in 2020 by a new holding company that has yet to relaunch production.

== History ==
=== Ormston Burns Ltd. (1959–1965) ===
Ormston Burns Ltd was founded in 1959 by luthier James Ormston (Jim) Burns and Alice Louise Farrell, who provided financial and operational leadership.

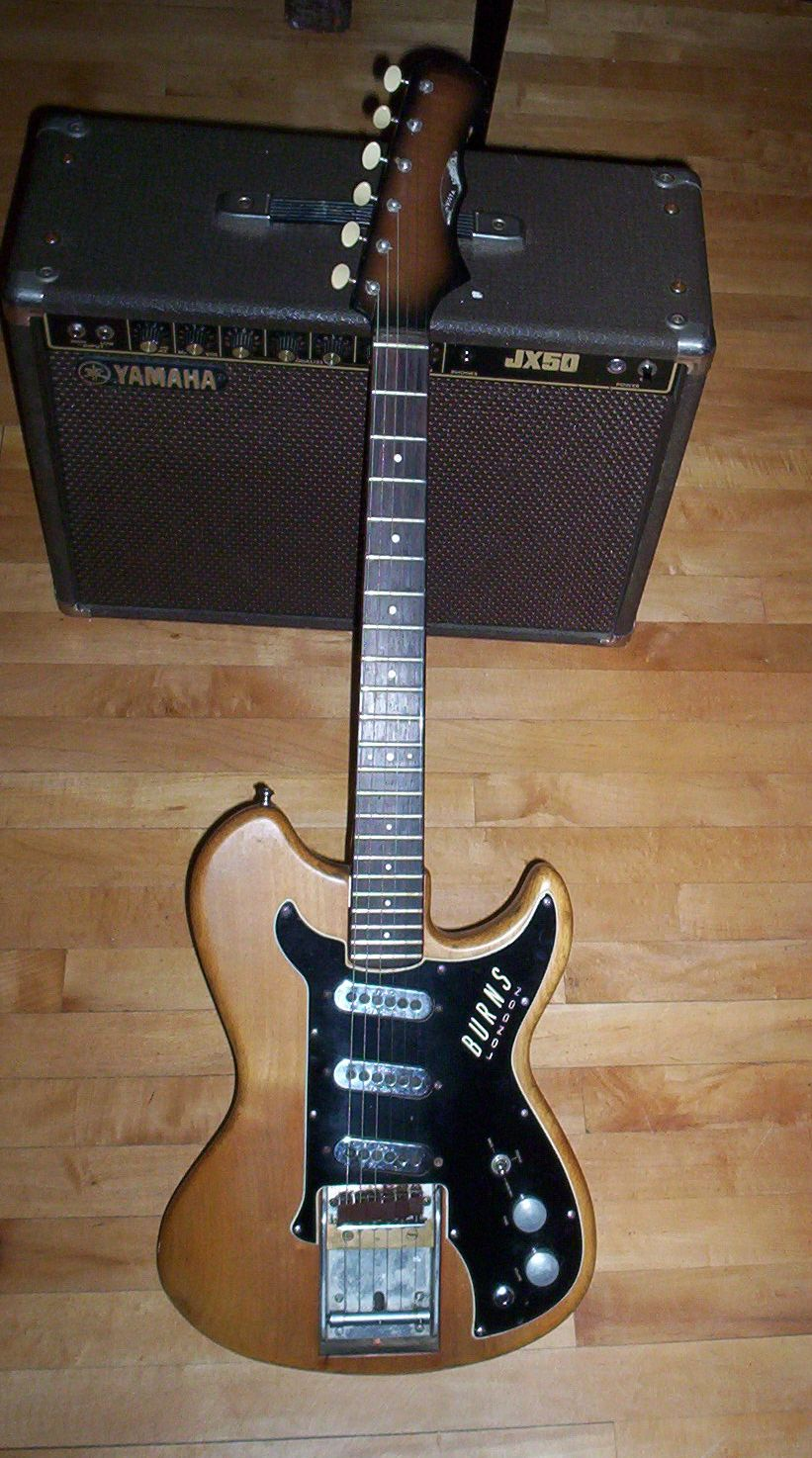
A 1962 Burns Vista Sonic, with the "Wild Dog" tone setting (missing original finish)

During this period, Burns developed a proprietary vibrato system, patented in the United States in late 1962 (US Des. 194,067, issued 13 November 1962). The system was later adopted by manufacturers including Gretsch.

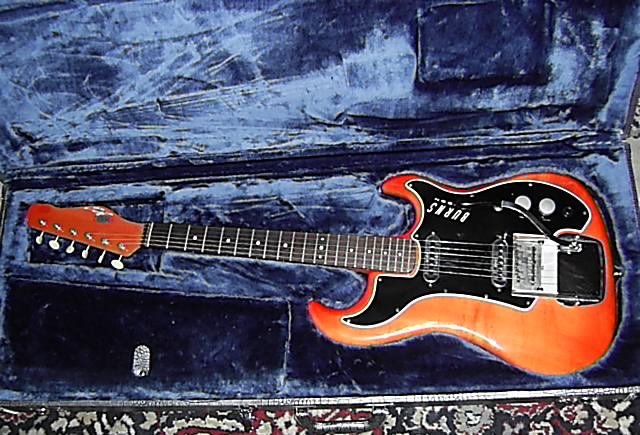
Shortscale Jazz Guitar

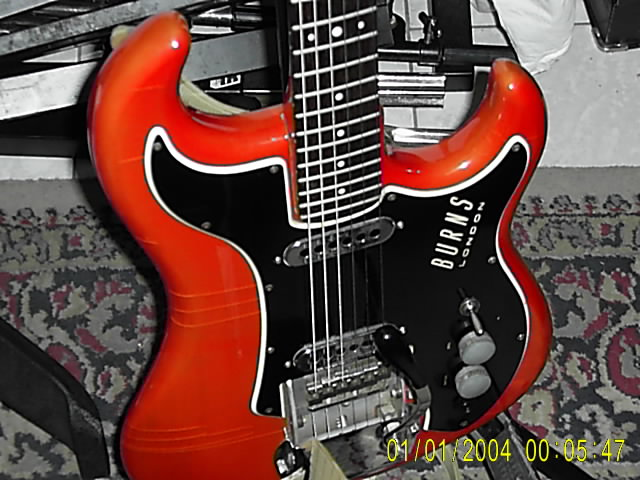
Detail of Shortscale Jazz Guitar

The U.S. brand Ampeg imported British-made Burns guitars. Apart from the pickguard badge ("Ampeg by Burns of London"), these models were otherwise identical to their UK counterparts.

=== Baldwin‑Burns (1965–1970) ===
Ormston Burns Ltd was acquired by the Baldwin Piano Company in October 1965 and rebranded as Baldwin‑Burns. (latterly Baldwin).

The company launched three amplifiers at the June 1965 NAMM Convention.

Some collectors have asserted that the Baldwin-era instruments were somehow inferior to those produced before the takeover, but with the exception of some newly-introduced models, the quality standards on models like the Marvin, Jazz Guitar and Shadows bass remained consistent, with only minor cosmetic differences and the Baldwin badge to distinguish them from the Burns-branded era of production.

For a short time, existing stock was rebadged (initially as 'Baldwin-Burns', then simply 'Baldwin') by the simple expedient of inserting a routed nameplate into the pickguard, from which the earlier Burns routing had been excised. This practice did not last long, and original Baldwin pickguards appeared shortly afterwards, identical to the Burns originals save for the Baldwin routing.

Other commercially-driven changes included replacing the elaborate carved scroll head (seen on earlier versions of the Marvin, Virginian and others) with a simpler, flattened scroll introduced in mid‑1966, and by 1967 most models featured a flat scroll head and bound fingerboard.

Towards the end of the 1960s, Baldwin took the decision to concentrate on the Gretsch range of guitars and drums which they had acquired in 1967, and the Baldwin guitar brand was wound down, with production coming to an end in 1970.

=== Ormston (1966–1968) ===
In 1966, following the acquisition of Ormston Burns Ltd by Baldwin, Jim Burns founded a new company named simply Ormston, in partnership with Nigel Dennis and Gordon Huntley to market pedal steel guitars produced by Denley.

In 1968, just before Ormston shut its doors, Jim Burns produced one notable guitar design that would later form the basis of the Hayman range developed for the Dallas-Arbiter Organisation.

=== Burns UK Ltd. (1974–1977) ===
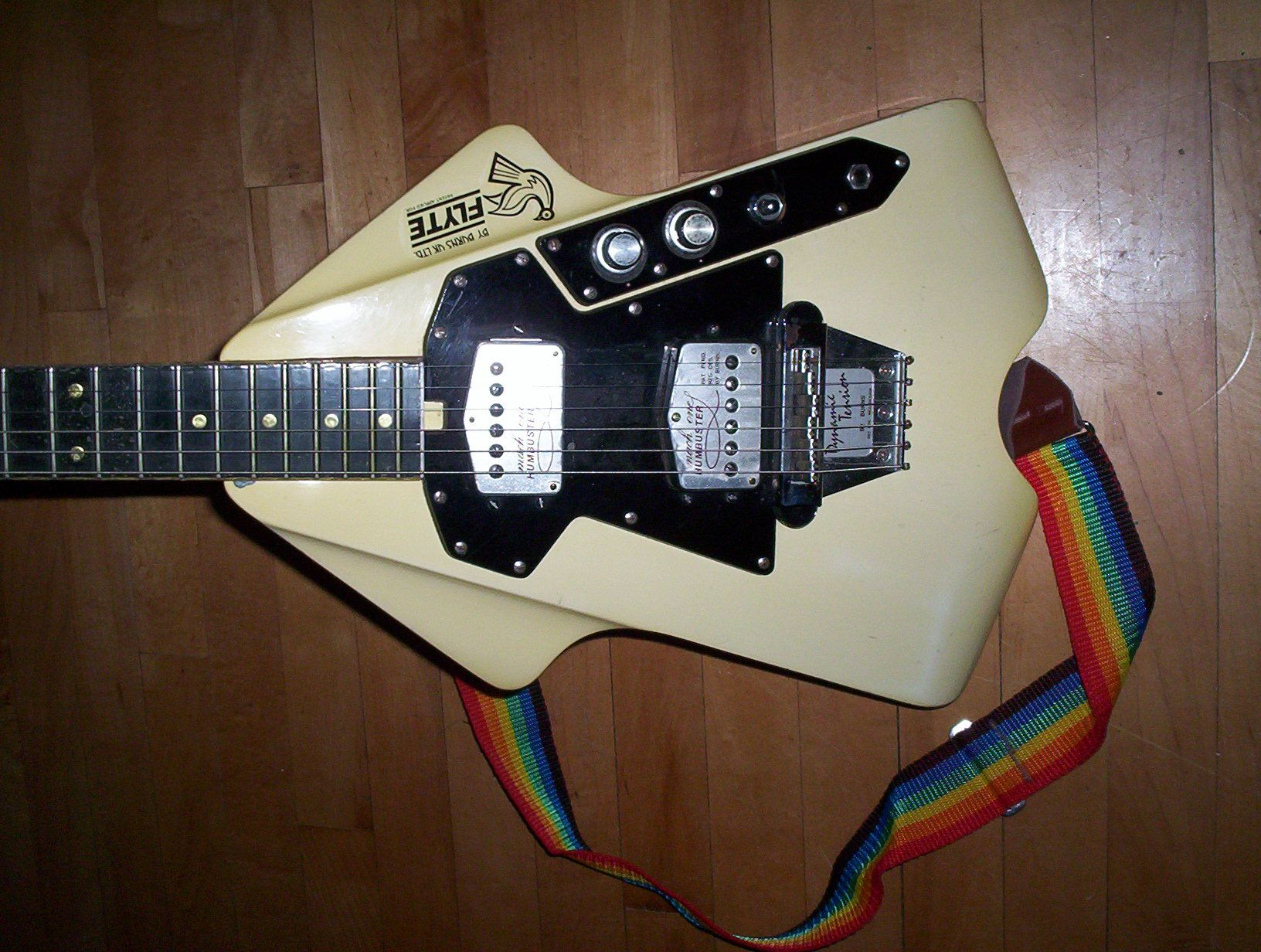
Burns Flyte, a popular glam rock guitar with Mach One Humbuster pickups

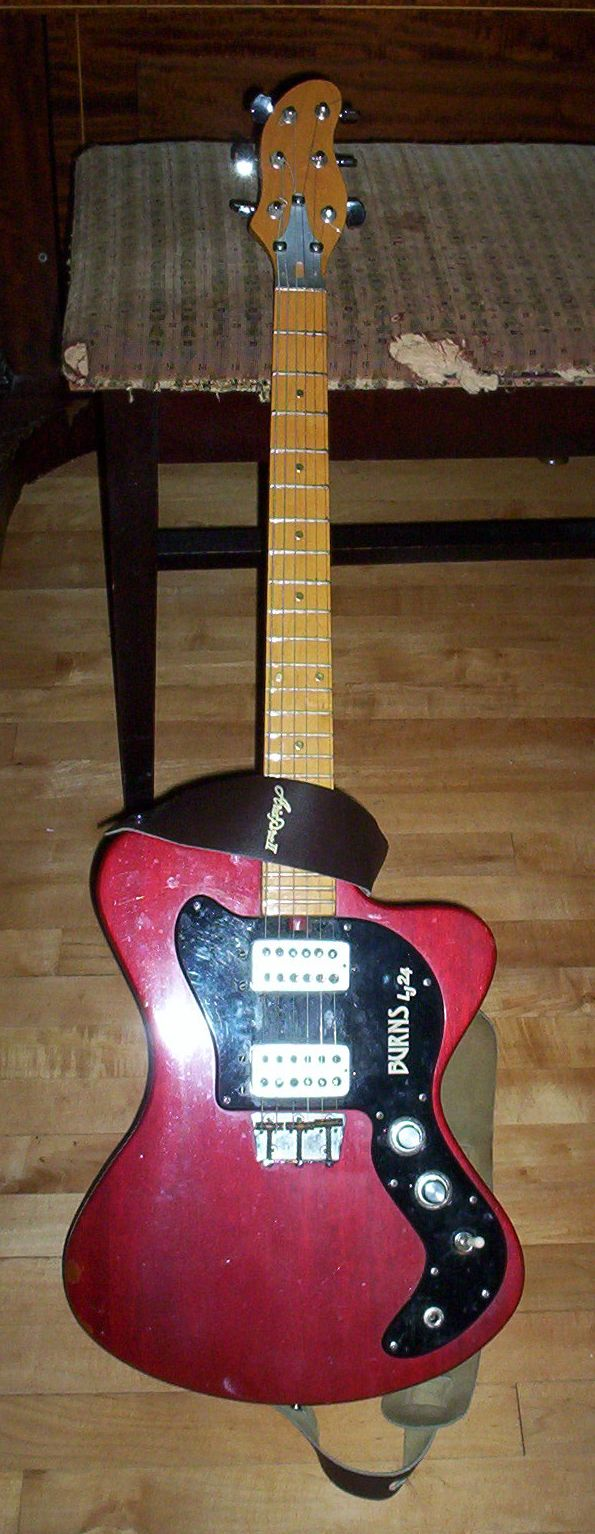
The 1977 release of the simpler LJ24 with new Mach Two pickups came too late to save Burns UK

In the mid 1970s, Jim Burns partnered with Alan Wright of City Music Stores to form Burns UK Ltd. The use of the Burns name was again possible after Baldwin-Burns ceased guitar production in 1970.

The company operated from 1974 to 1977, producing several distinctive models—including the angular Flyte (inspired by the Concorde), Artist, Mirage, and LJ24. Bodies and necks were reportedly manufactured by Shergold.

Although the Flyte attracted attention among glam rock performers, Burns UK ceased trading in 1977.

=== Jim Burns Actualizers Ltd (1979–1983) ===
Following the closure of Burns UK, Jim Burns founded Jim Burns Actualizers Ltd in 1979, based in Littleport near Ely.

The company focused on more recognizably "Burns" designs, including the Steer, Scorpion, Magpie, and Bandit. It also marked the first attempt to recreate the Bison and Marvin in updated form.

The Steer gained popularity with Billy Bragg, while a custom Scorpion variant was produced in small quantities for Chris Stein of Blondie.

Jim Burns Actualizers Ltd ceased operations in 1983.

=== Burns London Ltd. (1992–2020) ===
In 1992, Barry Gibson, a guitarist and guitar historian, relaunched the company as Burns London Ltd, and employed Jim Burns as a consultant.

The entity was originally incorporated on 3 December 1991 as Ritzybase Ltd (company no. 02668005), and renamed Burns London Ltd on 9 January 1992.

Burns London Ltd initially focused on handmade replicas of classic Burns guitars. Gaz Coombes of Supergrass played a reissue Bison model.

In 1999, the company launched a budget line called the Club Series, manufactured in Korea. These retained key Burns design elements and grew in popularity. Budget versions of classic models included the Marquee (based on the Marvin), Steer, Bison, and Barracuda. Later models like the Batwing borrowed visual features from 1960s designs.

In the early 2000s, an entry-level line was introduced, manufactured in China. These included the Cobra (with a Stratocaster-style body but Burns styling) and Nu-Sonic (resembling a Telecaster, but with Burns-specific pickups and body carving).

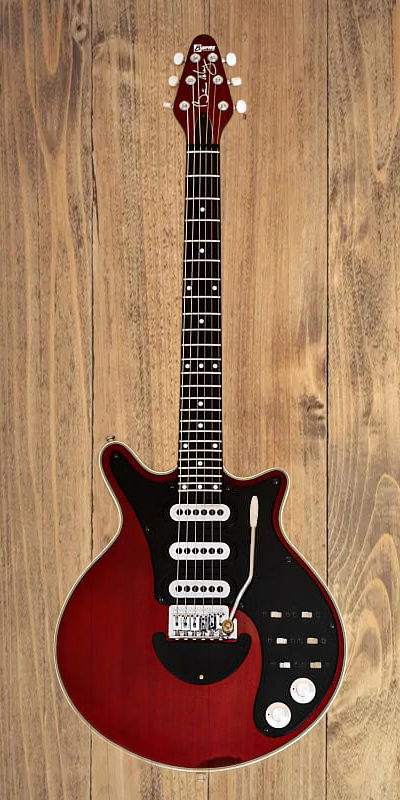
A Burns Brian May Red Special guitar, manufactured 2001–2004

Burns also collaborated with Queen guitarist Brian May to produce a replica of his Red Special guitar, with the signature model manufactured from October 2001 until July 2004. This model was awarded "Best Electric Guitar of the Year 2001" by Guitarist magazine.

The company’s public activity declined after the mid-2010s. No new guitar production has been confirmed since that time. Companies House filings indicate Burns London Ltd ceased including profit and loss accounts in its annual reports beginning in 2016, suggesting a reduction or cessation of trading activity.

=== Burns London Ltd. (Holding Company, 2020–) ===
On 2 June 2020, Burns London (Holdings) Ltd (company no. 12638371), was incorporated under new ownership by a six-member consortium: Simon Gilson and Terry Hope, co-founders and former owners of musical instrument retailer PMT, formerly Professional Music Technology; Lee Anderton, managing director of Andertons Music Co.; Peter Anderton, associated with Andertons Music Co.; Graham Bell, co-founder of the UK guitar retailer GuitarGuitar; and Christopher McBay, a UK-based business executive. Several members of this consortium previously collaborated on the EastCoast guitar brand.

This entity replaced the previous operating company, Barry Gibson's Burns London Ltd (company no. 02668005).

On 26 June 2020, the company's official website was updated to remove all product listings and instead display the message: "Imagined in 1959 / Re-Imagined in 2021" and "Now this amazing, historic brand is set to secure a bright future as the new owners look forward to revealing the re-imagined Burns range in 2021." On 26 March 2022, the website was updated to display: "Re-Imagined in 2022". It does not appear to have been updated again in the years since.

On 27 September 2022, the new holding company adopted the name Burns London Ltd, while the original operating company was renamed Burns London (Holdings) Ltd.

Simon Gilson resigned as a director of the new company on 10 March 2023.

The earlier company was voluntarily dissolved on 11 April 2023.

The company's "Burns LONDON" trademark expired in March 2024. However, a new trademark application was filed in May 2025, and registered in August 2025 suggesting that a revival of Burns London may be under consideration.

Christopher McBay also resigned as a director of the new company on 1st December 2025.
