= The Trevor Horn Band =

British rock band

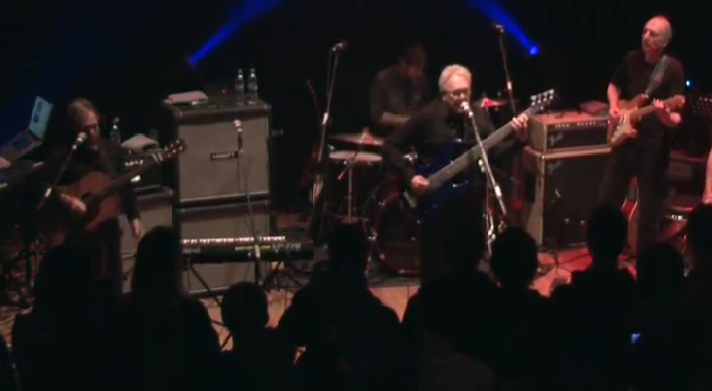
- Producers performing at ACM, Guildford in 2012 (L-R: Lol Creme, Ash Soan (drums), Trevor Horn and Steve Lipson

Background information
- Also known as: (The) Producers (2006–09, 09–15), US (briefly in 2009), The Trevor Horn Orchestra (once in 2012)
- Origin: London, England
- Genres: Synth-pop; new wave; pop rock; progressive rock
- Years active: 2006–present
- Labels: Stiff, ZTT
- Members: Lol Creme; Trevor Horn
- Past members: Chris Braide; Steve Lipson; Ash Soan
- Website: producersmusic.co.uk (defunct)

The Trevor Horn Band are an English group based around record producer and bass player Trevor Horn.

Horn and others got together as the Producers in 2006, when they included producers Horn (bass and vocals), Chris Braide (keyboards and vocals) and Steve Lipson (guitar), and musicians Lol Creme (guitar and vocals) and Ash Soan (drums). Braide left in 2009 due to work commitments, though still contributed to the band's début album Made in Basing Street, released on 25 June 2012.

The band continued to play live and, with the membership evolving, switched to the name The Trevor Horn Band, with Horn and Creme remaining core members. Gary Langan also works with the band, engineering and mixing in the studio and working front of house at gigs.

== History ==
=== Formation and Camden gigs (2006–09) ===
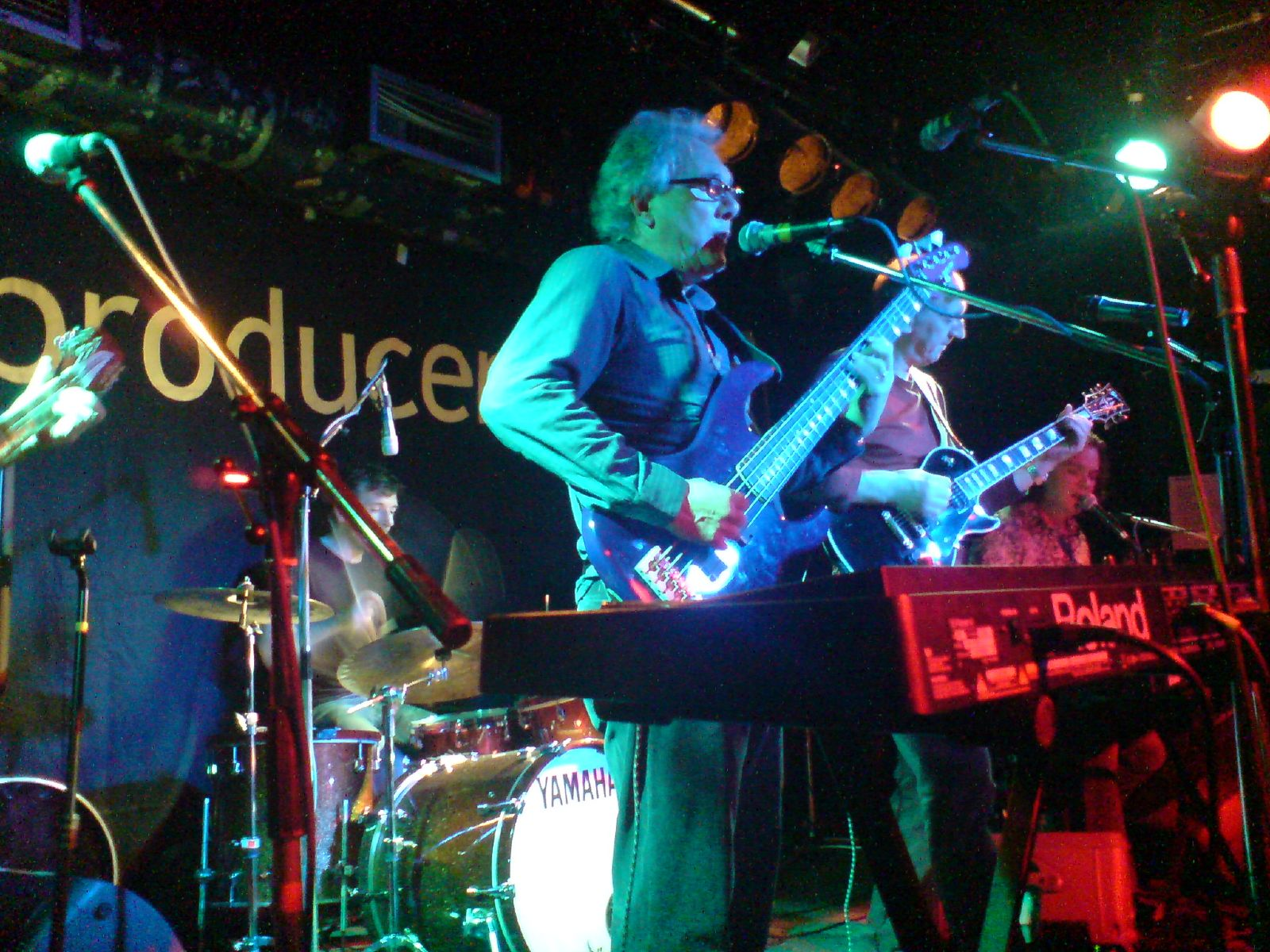
The original line-up (L-R; Creme (out-of-shot), Soan (drums), Horn, Lipson and Braide) performing at the Camden Barfly

The concept for the band was conceived as a mutual means for the ZTT music producer partners Trevor Horn (formerly of The Buggles, Yes and Art of Noise) and Steve Lipson (session guitarist for a number of acts) to take a break from their work in the studio and play their songs live. Joined by producer Chris Braide, music video director and former 10cc frontman Lol Creme (also formerly of Godley and Creme and Art of Noise) and session drummer Ash Soan (worked for various artists including Dido and Robbie Williams, and former member of Del Amitri), they named the project The Producers in reference to their careers in the studio, and started out playing live covers. Braide described the formation of the band:

"The idea was... I was good friends with Steve Lipson, who worked with Trevor on all the Frankie Goes to Hollywood stuff, all that stuff. And Steve and I were good mates and he kept saying to me we should form a band and get out of the studio, just have some fun. This was way back in early 2000s. And we did eventually. And Trevor got involved with Lol, and then I brought Ash Soan, the drummer, in, who I'd known for years before that. And we had good fun, y’know, and then... So, to cut a long story short, I moved to the US and, and that ended."

Their first gig was at the Barfly in Camden Town, London in November 2006, playing songs from the members' history (including "Video Killed The Radio Star" by The Buggles, Clay Aiken's song "Invisible" (co-written by Braide), and 10cc's "Rubber Bullets" and "I'm Not in Love"), as well as covers of other songs that the members had written, worked on, or simply enjoyed. The band was joined by percussionist Luís Jardim and guests; Anne Dudley, David Jordan, producer Bruce Woolley (a friend of Horn's who worked with The Buggles) and Will Young. The band would eventually return to the studio to record original material for Horn and Langan's ZTT branch of Stiff Records, with sessions beginning in Los Angeles in December 2006. Producer, audio engineer and third former member of Art of Noise, Gary Langan, joined as the band's engineer, mixing the album and working front of house at live shows.

A second Camden gig in February 2007 followed a similar format to their first show, but also debuted two original songs, "Freeway" (sung by Braide, which Horn has said was inspired by driving on a freeway from Los Angeles) and "Barking Up the Right Tree" (an acoustic piece sung by Creme). The band was joined again by Jardim and Jordan, as well as Jamie Cullum. "Barking Up the Right Tree" would be released as a single with "Freeway" as a B-side in 2007 on the Stiff Records label. Further gigs in Camden would see more new songs: "Your Life", "Man on the Moon", "You and I", "Waiting for the Right Time" and a song entitled "Music from Bel Air" (which wouldn't appear on the album), and featured more guest appearances, including Tina Charles (whose backing band Horn began his musical career as part of) on their cover of Grace Jones' "Slave to the Rhythm".

The Producers' début album was originally announced under the name Studio 1, to be released on the Stiff label, but was then renamed Watching You Out There (sharing its name with a new song that wouldn't be revealed until the 2012 university tour). The album was eventually released as Made in Basing Street, referencing its creation at the SARM Studios (formerly Basing Street Studios, now owned by Horn) in London's Notting Hill.

=== Work on first album and university tour (2009–2012) ===
Braide left the band as an official "member" in early 2009 due to work commitments, but would continue to perform at gigs between October 2009 and January 2010, as well as contributing to the album when he could. The remaining members decided to change their name to US (pronounced "Us"), but still played live under "The Producers", possibly due to Braide's presence. With the name change, the début album was now to be named The Path of Sydney Arthur, and was to be a concept piece based around the fictional life-story of a man born on the same day as the 1969 Moon landing. The Sydney Arthur idea has not been mentioned since 2009, and it is unknown whether or not it contributed towards the finished album. The short-lived "US" name vanished with the Sydney Arthur idea, and the definite article was dropped, the band now officially going by Producers (though the definite article is still often used for linguistic simplicity).

The remaining members continued with recording sessions at SARM during 2010, with Braide recording vocals on a new song, "Garden of Flowers", in Los Angeles the same year. A new version of "Freeway", still with Braide on vocals, was made available online. The original version of "Freeway" appears on the second disc of the 2CD special edition of Made in Basing Street as "Freeway (Extended)". Outside of the band, all five original members worked together on various other projects, including supporting Horn in the September 2010 and October 2011 reunion shows by The Buggles, with Horn's fellow "Buggle", former Yes bandmate and now Asia keyboardist Geoff Downes also working with The Producers.

In March 2012, the band set out on a small tour of English universities and music colleges, playing at Southampton Solent University, South Birmingham College, Leeds College of Music, Buckinghamshire New University and the Academy of Contemporary Music in Guildford. The concerts (which followed Q&A sessions with the music students attending the institutions) consisted of an hour-long set, which followed the format of previous gigs with hits such as "Video Killed the Radio Star", "Slave to the Rhythm", "I'm Not in Love", and David Bowie's "Space Oddity", as well as performances of the band's original songs, "Barking Up the Right Tree", "Freeway", and the live débuts of "Watching You Out There" and "Garden of Flowers" (with Horn taking the place of Braide on lead vocals where appropriate). Other hits were also played, such as 10cc's "The Dean and I", "Two Tribes" by Frankie Goes to Hollywood, and t.A.T.u.'s "All the Things She Said". The concerts also borrowed from the 2011 Buggles reunion gig, including its tongue-in-cheek cover of "Check It Out" by will.i.am and Nicki Minaj (a song which samples "Video Killed the Radio Star"), and a contest winner being given the opportunity to sing backing vocals on the finale of "Video Killed the Radio Star". The three female backing singers from the Buggles concert – Kirsten Joy, Holly Petrie and Kate Westall – also toured with the band, providing female vocals for appropriate songs such as the aforementioned "Slave to the Rhythm" and "All the Things She Said". The tour was intended as a showcase of Made in Basing Street. Horn's brother, Ken, a television producer and director, was present at the concerts as a camera operator.

Geoff Downes and Chris Braide also started working together as DBA (Downes Braide Association), with an album, Pictures of You, released on Cherry Red Records in November 2012. Braide has described how the album's lyrics are thematically related to the Producers song "Watching You Out There". The DBA collaboration has continued with two more albums and other projects.

=== Made in Basing Street and subsequent live work (2012–present) ===
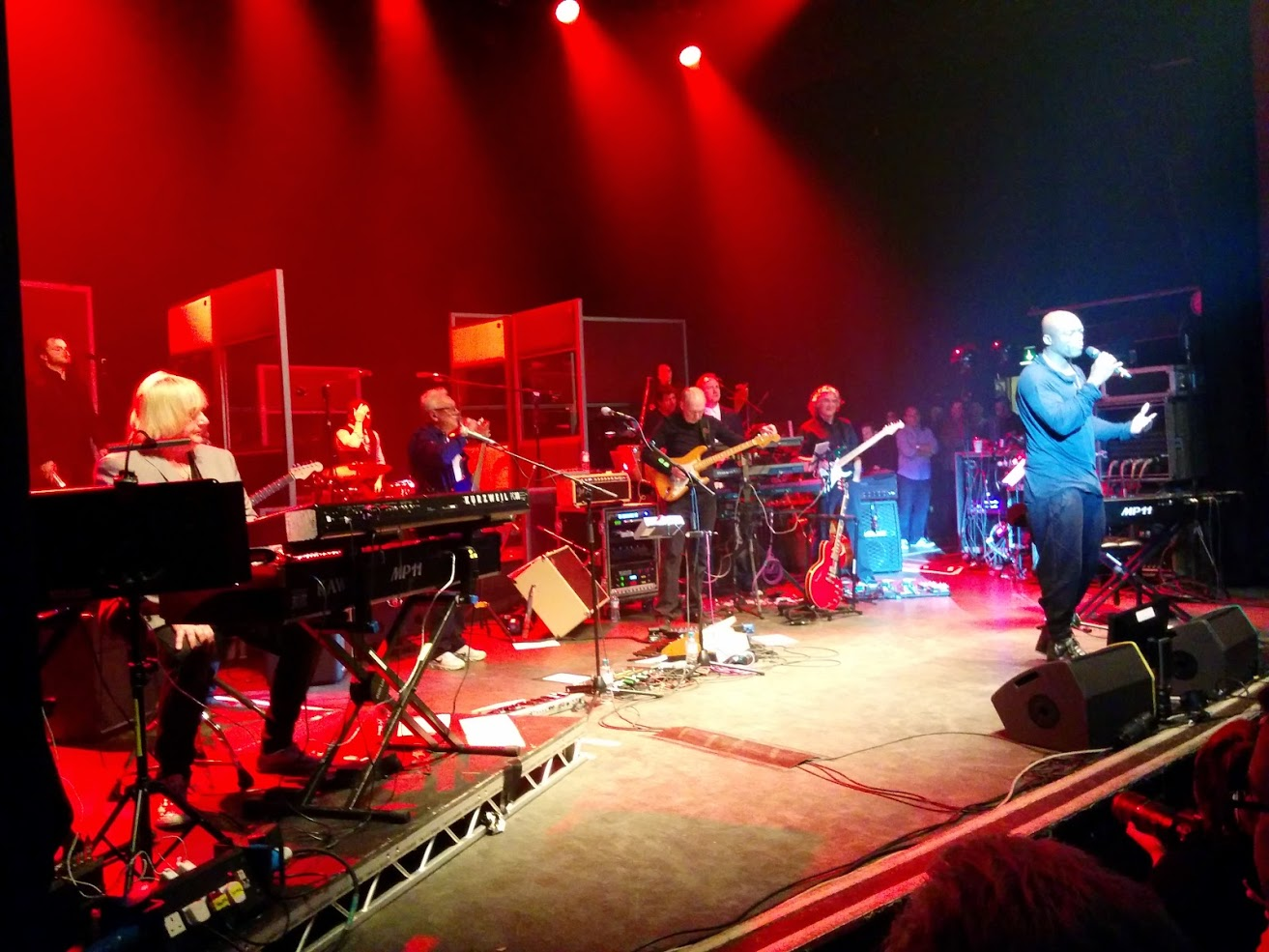
The Trevor Horn Band performing on 5 March 2015 at the O2 Shepherd's Bush Empire in London. L-R; Jamie Squire, Geoff Downes, Lol Crème (behind Downes), Ash Soan, Trevor Horn, Luis Jardim, Simon Bloor (behind Jardim), Steve Lipson, Julian Hinton, Phil Palmer, Seal (making an announcement). Not pictured Kirsten Joy, Kate Westall.

Made in Basing Street, the 10-track début album was released 25 June 2012 under "The LAST Label" – an imprint of ZTT created by the four, named by taking the first letters of the Producers' first names (Lol, Ash, Stephen, Trevor); a 2CD special edition was also released featuring bonus tracks on the second disc. Horn, Creme, Lipson, Soan and Braide perform on every track, with other performers including Ryan Molloy, Luís Jardim, Kirsten Joy and Kate Westall.

In July 2012, following the release of the album, Horn, Creme, Soan, and some other musicians – many involved with Producers – played a gig at the Half Moon pub in Putney as the "Trevor Horn Orchestra", before going on to tour Japan, where they were billed as "Trevor Horn feat. Lol Creme & Ash Soan/Producers", with Phil Palmer filling in for the absent Lipson on guitar. Like Producers, this band performed live sets featuring songs from Horn's recording history, as well as some 10cc songs, but did not perform any material from Made in Basing Street.

In September 2012, Producers, in a line-up including Lipson and Ryan Molloy, performed at The Big Feastival, a food and music festival in Oxfordshire hosted by celebrity chef Jamie Oliver and Alex James of Blur. The album was released in Germany on 1 December 2012, with the band promoting the album across European radio stations in November 2012.

The group spent 2013 on hiatus while the members spent time on other projects, before performing alongside Seal (a Horn-produced artist) at the 2014 MPG Awards in February. The performance was in honour of Horn winning the award for Outstanding Contribution.

The band reemerged on 5 March 2015 at the O2 Shepherd's Bush Empire in London under the name "The Trevor Horn Band", with Geoff Downes, Luis Jardim, Kirsten Joy, Kate Westall, Jamie Squire, Julian Hinton, Phil Palmer and Simon Bloor. Guests included Gabrielle Aplin, Mr Probz and Ella Eyre. Seal was unable to perform due to flu.

The band, with Seal, played European dates in July 2015, including at the Cornbury Music Festival in Oxfordshire and in Amsterdam.

As of 2016, the band's line-up has consisted of Horn and Creme, with varying guest musicians, but Ryan Molloy usually on lead vocals since 2018. The band played UK and Japanese dates in 2017, UK dates in 2018, 2019 at Cornbury Music Festival, 2021 at Rewind Festival, and 2022 at Cropredy Music Festival and as a support group for Nile Rodgers & Chic. They returned to Cropredy in 2025.
