= Last Choir Standing =

- Presented by: Myleene Klass; Nick Knowles
- Judges: Russell Watson; Sharon D. Clarke; Suzi Digby
- Country of origin: United Kingdom
- No. of series: 1
- No. of episodes: 16

Production
- Running time: 30–90mins
- Production company: BBC

Original release
- Network: BBC One, BBC HD
- Release: 5 July – 30 August 2008

Last Choir Standing is a 2008 talent show-themed television series produced by the BBC in the United Kingdom. Broadcast on BBC One in July and August 2008, the series saw amateur choirs competing each week to be the 'last choir standing'.

The series was presented by Myleene Klass and Nick Knowles, with judges Russell Watson, Sharon D. Clarke and Suzi Digby. In the final, following a public telephone vote, the winners were announced as Welsh male voice choir Only Men Aloud!.

A collection of songs from the series was released as an album in November 2008.

== Format ==
The programme, initially to be called Choir Wars, looked to find 'the nation's favourite choir'. Presented by Myleene Klass and Nick Knowles, the programme aired on Saturday nights, with some of the results shows shown on Sundays, in the same timeslot as other BBC entertainment programs such as Strictly Come Dancing and I'd Do Anything.

Applications on tape were accepted from amateur choirs of 10–50 people, aged 13 years or older, and around 1,000 choirs entered the competition. 60 choirs were then invited to audition in front of the three judges in May at Cadogan Hall in London, where the choirs required a 'yes' from two of the judges to proceed to the callbacks. The callbacks saw 27 choirs perform again in front of the judges, as well as other choirs and a studio audience at BBC Television Centre. 15 choirs were then chosen to perform in three rounds of studio heats, with two from each heat proceeding to the live shows. The final six choirs then sang for viewer votes over four weeks, with the choirs being eliminated one-by-one to find the last choir standing.

The format is very similar to Welsh show Côr Cymru (Choir of Wales). Both shows have even featured many of the same Welsh choirs in competition with each other.

=== Judges ===
The judges for the competition were:

- Russell Watson, crossover tenor
- Sharon D. Clarke, singer and actress
- Suzi Digby OBE, choral conductor and director
- Gary Barlow-Take That Singer/songwriter
- Robbie Williams-Take That Singer

== Choirs ==
27 choirs made it through to the callbacks. The following were eliminated before the studio heats:

- Balham SDA
- Basingstoke Ladies
- Cadenza
- Cantata
- Cantus Firmus
- Craigie Community Choir
- Ecclesbourne School chamber choir
- Kitsch in Sync
- Lifted
- Nelson Civic Ladies
- Pegasus
- Singing for Pleasure

Following the callbacks, 15 choirs made it through to the studio heats:

Choir	Members	From	Status
The Alleycats	10	St Andrews	Eliminated in the heats
City of Brighton Gay Men's Chorus	37	Brighton	Eliminated in the heats
Common Room Choir	15	Shropshire	Eliminated in the heats
Dreemz	10	Birmingham	Eliminated in the heats
A Handbag of Harmonies	50	Chester	Eliminated in the heats
Hear Me Now!	13	London	Eliminated in the heats
Hereford Police Male Choir	50	Hereford	Eliminated in the heats
Last Minute	13	Oxford and London	Eliminated in the heats
Open Arts Community Choir	25	Belfast	Eliminated in the heats
Sense of Sound	40	Liverpool	Eliminated, sixth place
City of Bath Male Choir	50	Bath	Eliminated, fifth place
ACM Gospel Choir	35	Guildford	Eliminated, fourth place
Revelation	15	East London	Third place
Ysgol Glanaethwy	50	Bangor	Second place
Only Men Aloud!	18	Cardiff	Winner

== Studio shows ==
=== Heat 1 ===
The first heat saw five of the remaining 15 choirs sing for their place in the live knockout shows. The judges put through Sense of Sound and Ysgol Glanaethwy. The show performances were:

- All choirs:
  - "Shine" (original artists: Take That)
- Performances (in order of performance):
  - Ysgol Glanaethwy: "Adiemus" (Karl Jenkins)
  - Sense of Sound: "Signed, Sealed, Delivered I'm Yours" (Stevie Wonder)
  - Alleycats: "Love Machine" (Girls Aloud)
  - Brighton Gay Men's Chorus: "I Am What I Am" (various)
  - Dreemz: "Somewhere Over the Rainbow" (Patti LaBelle/Eva Cassidy Judy Garland)
  - Ysgol Glanaethwy: "Beatles Medley" (The Beatles)
  - Sense of Sound: "Cry Me a River" (Justin Timberlake)
  - Alleycats: "Freedom/Faith/Valerie Medley" (Wham!/George Michael/The Zutons)
  - Brighton Gay Men's Chorus: "He Ain't Heavy, He's My Brother" (The Hollies)
  - Dreemz: "Ain't No Mountain High Enough" (Marvin Gaye and Tammi Terrell/Diana Ross)
- Sense of Sound were then chosen by the judges to be the first choir through to the live shows, and they performed "Let It Be" by The Beatles. Brighton Gay Men's Chorus were eliminated from the competition. The remaining three choirs then performed again:
  - Dreemz: "You Are Not Alone" (Michael Jackson)
  - Ysgol Glanaethwy: "Lean on Me" (Bill Withers)
  - Alleycats: "Don't Stop Me Now" (Queen)
- The judges then chose Ysgol Glanaethwy as the second choir through to the live shows.

=== Heat 2 ===
The second heat saw five more of the final 15 choirs sing for their place in the live knockout shows. The judges put through Revelation and Only Men Aloud!. The show performances were:

- All choirs:
  - "Can You Feel It" (The Jacksons)
- Performances (in order of performance):
  - Only Men Aloud!: "It's Not Unusual" (Tom Jones)
  - Revelation: "Shackles (Praise You)" (Mary Mary)
  - Last Minute: "Spider-Man" (Michael Bublé, from Spider-Man)
  - The Common Room Choir: "Crazy" (Gnarls Barkley)
  - Hereford Police Male Choir: "Magic Moments/Catch a Falling Star" (Perry Como)
  - Only Men Aloud!: "Danny Boy" (various)
  - Revelation: "Rule the World" (Take That)
  - Last Minute: "It's My Life" (Bon Jovi)
  - The Common Room Choir: "Piece of My Heart" (Dusty Springfield/Janis Joplin)
  - Hereford Police Male Choir: "The Rose" (Bette Midler/Westlife)
- Revelation were then chosen by the judges to be the next choir through to the live shows, and they performed "Amazing Grace". The Common Room Choir were eliminated from the competition. The remaining three choirs then performed again:
  - Hereford Police Male Choir: "All I Ask of You" (from The Phantom of the Opera)
  - Last Minute: "Wonderful Tonight" (Eric Clapton)
  - Only Men Aloud!: "Kiss from a Rose" (Seal)
- The judges then chose Only Men Aloud! to proceed to the live shows.

=== Heat 3 ===
The last five of the final 15 choirs sang for their place in the live knockout shows in the third heat. The judges put through ACM Gospel Choir and City of Bath Male Choir. The show performances were:

- All choirs:
  - "With a Little Help from My Friends" (The Beatles)
- Performances (in order of performance):
  - ACM Gospel Choir: "I Wanna Be the Only One" (Eternal)
  - A Handbag of Harmonies: "Build Me Up Buttercup" (The Foundations)
  - City of Bath Male Choir: "Unchained Melody" (The Righteous Brothers)
  - Hear Me Now!: "Mercy" (Duffy)
  - Open Arts Community Choir: "(Something Inside) So Strong" (Labi Siffre)
  - ACM Gospel Choir: "One Love" (Bob Marley)
  - A Handbag of Harmonies: "Downtown" (Petula Clark)
  - City of Bath Male Choir: "Bring Him Home" (from Les Misérables)
  - Hear Me Now!: "California Dreamin'" (The Mamas & the Papas)
  - Open Arts Community Choir: "ABBA Medley" (ABBA)
- ACM Gospel Choir were then chosen by the judges to be the fifth choir through to the live shows, and they performed "I Believe I Can Fly" by R. Kelly. A Handbag of Harmonies were eliminated from the competition. The remaining three choirs then performed again:
  - City of Bath Male Choir: "I Believe" (Elvis Presley)
  - Hear Me Now: "Can You Feel the Love Tonight" (from The Lion King)
  - Open Arts Community Choir: "I Say a Little Prayer" (Dionne Warwick)
- The judges then chose City of Bath Male Choir to be the final choir through to the live shows.

=== Knockout 1 ===
The first of the live shows allowed viewers to vote for their favourite choir, and resulted in Sense of Sound leaving the competition. The show performances were:

- All choirs:
  - "Everybody Needs Somebody to Love" (The Blues Brothers)
  - "Bridge Over Troubled Water" (Simon & Garfunkel)
- Performances (in order of performance):
  - Ysgol Glanaethwy: "Bohemian Rhapsody" (Queen)
  - Revelation: "Fields of Gold" (Sting/Eva Cassidy)
  - ACM Gospel Choir: "September" (Earth, Wind & Fire)
  - City of Bath Male Choir: "Desperado" (Eagles)
  - Sense of Sound: "Smiley Faces" (Gnarls Barkley)
  - Only Men Aloud!: "Don't Rain on My Parade" (from Funny Girl)
- Clash of the Choirs:
  - Sense of Sound and Revelation received the fewest viewer votes and had to sing again:
    - Sense of Sound: "Gabriel" (Lamb)
    - Revelation: "Lovely Day" (Bill Withers)
  - Sharon and Russell chose to save Revelation and Suzi chose Sense of Sound, meaning Sense of Sound were eliminated.

=== Knockout 2 ===
The second knockout round resulted in Bath Male Choir being eliminated from the competition. The show performances were:

- All choirs:
  - "One Vision" (Queen)
- Performances (in order of performance):
  - City of Bath Male Choir: "Can't Take My Eyes Off You" (Frankie Valli)
  - ACM Gospel Choir: "Stand by Me" (Ben E. King)
  - Revelation: "Higher Love" (Steve Winwood)
  - Only Men Aloud!: "When You Say Nothing at All" (Ronan Keating)
  - Ysgol Glanaethwy: "O Fortuna (Carmina Burana)" (Carl Orff)
  - City of Bath Male Choir: "What a Wonderful World" (Louis Armstrong)
  - ACM Gospel Choir: "Put a Little Love in Your Heart" (Al Green and Annie Lennox)
  - Revelation: "Flying Without Wings" (Westlife)
  - Only Men Aloud!: "James Bond Theme"/"Goldfinger" (John Barry/Shirley Bassey)
  - Ysgol Glanaethwy: "I Want You Back" (The Jackson 5)
- Clash of the Choirs:
  - City of Bath Male Choir and Revelation received the fewest viewer votes and had to sing again:
    - City of Bath Male Choir: "Something" (The Beatles)
    - Revelation: "Love the One You're With" (Stephen Stills)
  - All three judges chose to save Revelation, meaning City of Bath Male Choir were eliminated.

=== Semi-final ===
ACM Gospel Choir left the competition in the third knockout round after losing out in the Clash of the Choirs. The show performances were:

- All choirs:
  - "One Night Only" (from Dreamgirls)
- Performances (in order of performance):
  - ACM Gospel Choir: "(Your Love Keeps Lifting Me) Higher and Higher" (Jackie Wilson)
  - Ysgol Glanaethwy: "Rhythm of Life" (from Sweet Charity)
  - Only Men Aloud!: "Angels" (Robbie Williams)
  - Revelation: "I Knew You Were Waiting (For Me)" (George Michael and Aretha Franklin)
  - ACM Gospel Choir: "I'll Be There" (The Jackson 5)
  - Ysgol Glanaethwy: "Somebody To Love" (Queen)
  - Only Men Aloud!: "Luck Be a Lady" (from Guys and Dolls)
  - Revelation: "I Want to Know What Love Is" (Foreigner)
- Clash of the Choirs:
  - ACM Gospel Choir and Ysgol Glanaethwy received the fewest viewer votes and had to sing again:
    - ACM Gospel Choir: "Joyful, Joyful" (from Sister Act 2: Back in the Habit)
    - Ysgol Glanaethwy: "Circle of Life" (from The Lion King)
  - All three judges chose to save Ysgol Glanaethwy, meaning ACM Gospel Choir were eliminated.

=== Final ===
In the last week of competition, the final three choirs performed "Shine" by Take That at the handover party for the 2012 Summer Olympics outside Buckingham Palace.

During the final, the choirs performed two songs before Revelation were eliminated after receiving the fewest viewer votes. Only Men Aloud! and Ysgol Glanaethwy performed again, and Only Men Aloud! were announced as the winners. The final also saw the return of ACM Gospel choir who accompanied Russell singing "Heaven help us all" by Stevie Wonder. The show performances were:

- All choirs:
  - "I'm Still Standing" (Elton John)
  - "Never Forget" (Take That)
- First performance (in order of performance):
  - Only Men Aloud!: "Cwm Rhondda" (John Hughes)
  - Ysgol Glanaethwy: "Try a Little Tenderness" (various)
  - Revelation: "Ain't No Stoppin' Us Now" (McFadden and Whitehead)
- Second performance (in order of performance), chosen by the judges as their 'song of the series' for each choir:
  - Only Men Aloud!: "Don't Rain on My Parade" (from Funny Girl)
  - Ysgol Glanaethwy: "O Fortuna (Carmina Burana)" (Carl Orff)
  - Revelation: "Rule the World" (Take That)
- Following the elimination of Revelation, who received the lowest number of viewer votes, the final two performed again:
  - Ysgol Glanaethwy: "All That Jazz" (from Chicago)
  - Only Men Aloud!: "All by Myself" (Celine Dion)
- Following the public vote, Ysgol Glanaethwy were then eliminated, leaving Only Men Aloud! as the last choir standing and the winners of the competition. The winning choir were then invited to perform at the Royal Variety Performance and at BBC Radio 3's Choir of the Year final.

== Ratings ==
Show	Date	Official rating (millions)	BBC1 weekly ranking	Share
Heat 1	5 July 2008	4.75	20	22.8%
Heat 2	12 July 2008	4.40	17	24.6%
Heat 3	19 July 2008	3.60	—N/a	22.4%
Results	19 July 2008	4.09	20	19.6%
Knockouts 1	26 July 2008	3.55	24	23.7%
Results	27 July 2008	2.80	—N/a	19.0%
Knockouts 2	2 August 2008	4.09	18	25.1%
Results	3 August 2008	3.30	—N/a	14.0%
Knockout 3	9 August 2008	5.04	12	26.5%
Results	10 August 2008	4.06	26	24.6%
Knockout 4	16 August 2008	5.08	13	27.5%
Results	16 August 2008	4.92	14	23.9%
semi-final	23 August 2008	4.61	27	25.0%
Results	23 August 2008	4.84	21	21.6%
Final	30 August 2008	4.54	20	28.7%
Results	30 August 2008	5.56	8	24.9%
Average		4.33	—N/a	22.1%
