= Andertons Music Co. =

English musical instrument retailer

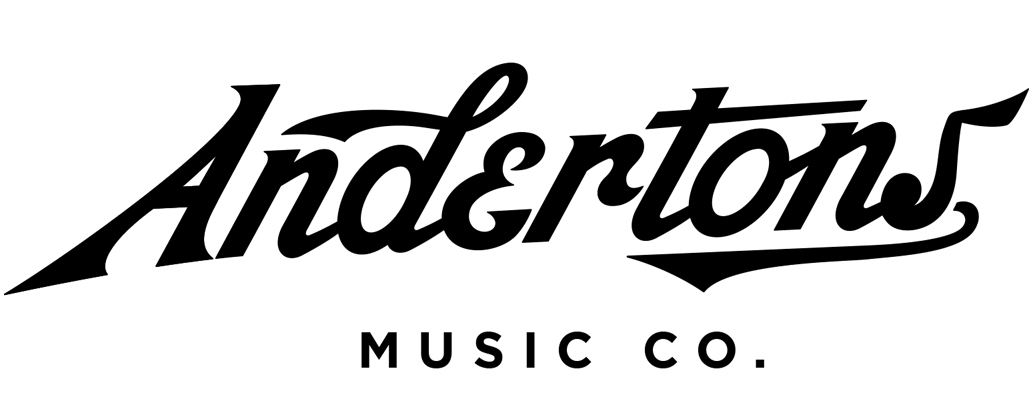

- Shopfront on Woodbridge Road, Guildford
- Type: Private
- Industry: Musical instrument retail
- Founded: 1964
- Founders: Harry Anderton; Peter Anderton
- Headquarters: Guildford, Surrey, England
- Key people: Lee Anderton
- Website: www.andertons.co.uk

Andertons Music Co. is a family owned partnership that sells musical instruments & professional audio equipment. The store & online operations are based in Guildford, Surrey, England. Its online store is one of the United Kingdom's top 150 e-commerce sites, with sales in excess of $70 million per year. Andertons has won numerous awards within the music industry, including the NAMM Music Dealer of The Year Award. Andertons is the only non-US based music store in the world to ever win this award. Andertons is widely known among guitarists & musicians for video demonstrations by co-owner Lee "The Captain" Anderton, Rob Chapman, and Peter Honoré a.k.a. "Danish Pete" as well as many other familiar faces on YouTube. Lee Anderton is also an investor in multiple musical equipment brands, including Chapman Guitars, Victory Amplification, EastCoast Guitars, Burns Guitars London, Landlord FX, and Ordo.

== History ==
Andertons Music Co. was established in 1964 as a family-owned partnership by Harry Anderton and his son, Peter Anderton, in Guildford, Surrey. The business originally operated as a local musical instrument storefront before transitioning through three generations of the Anderton family. It is currently under the leadership of Lee Anderton, Peter's son, who has overseen its transition into a global digital brand.

During the 2010s, the company underwent significant digital expansion, leveraging video content to evolve from a regional shop into a major global e-commerce entity. By 2018, it was recognized as one of the United Kingdom's top 150 internet retailers, with annual sales reported in excess of $70 million. Financial filings for the 2020s indicate continued growth, cementing its position as one of the largest independent musical instrument retailers in Europe.

Beyond retail, the founders have had a lasting impact on music education in the region. Peter Anderton co-founded the Academy of Contemporary Music (ACM) in Guildford, which was established to provide vocational training and degree-level education for contemporary musicians.

== YouTube ==
Andertons opened its primary YouTube channel in 2007, originally with the goal of highlighting product sales and featuring product reviews. The channel currently has over 1 million subscribers (September 2025).

In addition to product reviews and demos, Andertons has featured interviews with many notable guitarists and guitar makers, including Mick Thomson, Joe Bonamassa, Russ Parrish, Paul Gilbert, Guthrie Govan, Albert Lee, John Petrucci, Paul Reed Smith, Mary Spender, Nita Strauss, Walter Trout, Tommy Emmanuel and Steve Vai.

== Awards ==
Andertons has received numerous industry awards, including:

- NAMM 2019: Customer's Choice Award
- NAMM 2018: Dealer of The Year
- NAMM 2018: Best Online Engagement
- Internet Retailing Top 150 Retailer
- NAMM Awards Top 100 Retailer
- NAMM 2017: Best Online Engagement
- YouTube Silver Play Button Award
- Feefo Gold Trusted Service 2017
- 2015: Toast of Surrey Awards – Best Large Business
- Best music retailer at the Music Industries Association (MIAs) awards
- MIA Awards: People of the Moment profile: Kris Biddiss
