= Thermoteknix Systems Ltd =

Thermoteknix Systems Ltd – a British manufacturer of infrared (IR) imaging and thermal measurement based hardware, systems and software applications. Designs and manufactures thermal imaging and temperature screening solutions for industry, defence and security.

== History ==
Thermoteknix started its operations in 1982 and is headquartered at Teknix House in Cambridge, UK.

In 2024, Thermoteknix was awarded the inaugural King's Award for Enterprise (International Trade).

Thermoteknix was also previously awarded the "Queen's Award For Export Achievement" in 1998, and again awarded the Queen's Award for Enterprise (Innovation) in 2008 and the Queen's Award for Enterprise (Export Achievement) in 2015.

The company celebrated its 40-year anniversary in 2022 and continues to design and manufacture thermal imaging solutions at its Cambridge Headquarters. It celebrates a number of milestones throughout its 40-year history.

In September 2004 one of the Thermoteknix infrared cameras assisted with the cleanup after Hurricanes Charley and Frances in Florida, USA.

In 2005 Thermoteknix became technical partner of Red Bull Cheever Racing for the Indianapolis 500. A Thermoteknix camera was selected for use on the target missile in the November 2005's Aegis Ballistic Missile Defense (BMD) intercept test. The same cameras and technology were also used in Formula 1.

In June 2006 Thermoteknix camera was used in the Seaworld amusement park in Orlando, Florida, to see if infrared thermography could spot the reason a killer whale was off its food and had lost its performing edge.

In June 2009 one of the cameras made in Cambridge was blasted to the moon by NASA in the quest to find water.

In 2022, Thermoteknix was awarded a contract in excess of £3m to supply the UK Ministry of Defence (MoD) with its ClipIR XD-E Thermal Clip-on systems (TCOS).

== Operations ==
Main areas of operations: Miniature Radiometric & Rugged Thermal Imaging Cameras, High Definition Cameras for Kiln Shell Scanning, Thermal Imaging Handheld/ Helmet-Mounted Monoculars, Thermal Imaging Handheld Binoculars, Thermal Imaging Modules and Fused Night Vision Technology.

Within Infrared Thermography in the early 1980s Thermoteknix developed electronic hardware and software. In 2002 they launched a portable infrared camera – the world's first infrared camera with simultaneous video display, voice recording, Wi-Fi and Touch-screen Operator interface for Predictive Maintenance. These models are used for Fever Screening at airports, Science and Real-time R&D.

Process Industry IR Monitoring Systems developed by Thermoteknix include IR linescan and IR imaging video cameras, designed for long life and high performance accuracy in the harsh environments as cement plants, lime plants, paper mills, power plants and steel mills. A new product was introduced called FevIR Scan 2, which allows users to scan large groups of people and detect in an individual has a fever.

Miniature Radiometric & Rugged Thermal Imaging Cameras are developed for commercial and military industry which require small, low power radiometric cameras that survive in environmental extremes. These miniature IR cameras are installed in the fields of motor racing, rocketry and other applications.

Thermal Imaging Handheld and Helmet-Mounted cameras and Fused Night Vision Technology are designed for Defence & Security applications due to their low-power consumption and silent operation.

In 2022, Thermoteknix launched its Augmented Reality Tactical Interface Module (ARTIM) head-up display system for dismounted soldiers, which are being used on the frontline by British troops and NATO troops.
