= Joshua Lee Turner =

American musician

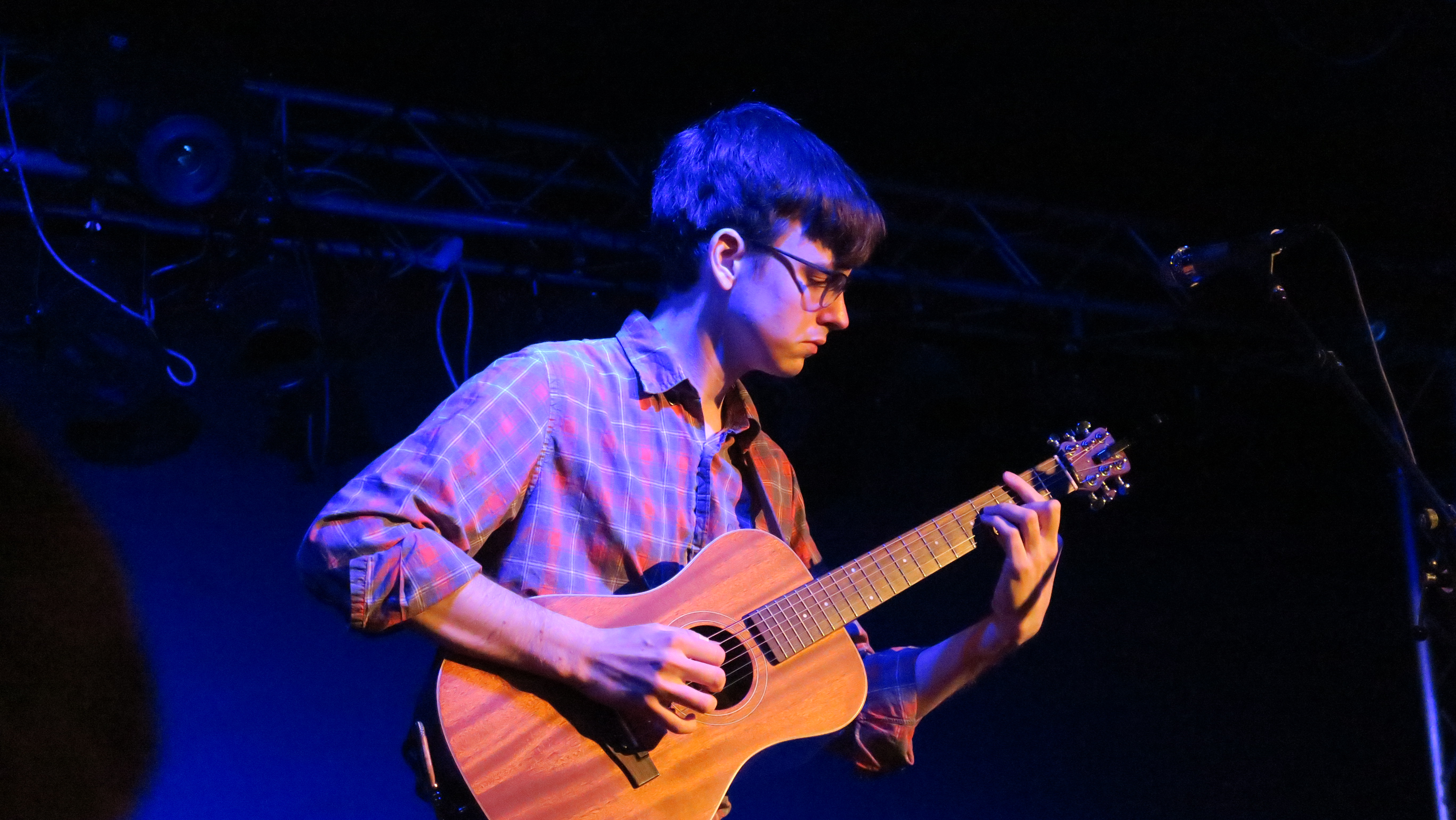

Background information
- Born: June 22, 1992 (age 34); Indianapolis, Indiana, U.S.
- Genres: Folk rock; indie folk; indie rock; bluegrass; classical
- Occupations: Musician; singer-songwriter; record producer
- Instruments: Vocals; guitar; banjo; bass guitar; mandolin; percussion
- Years active: 2007–present
- Label: Bring Luck
- Website: www.joshualeeturner.com

Joshua Lee Turner is an American singer-songwriter, multi-instrumentalist, record producer, and internet personality based in Brooklyn, New York. He is known for his eclectic guitar and vocal covers posted on his YouTube channel Josh Turner Guitar for which he and long time collaborator Carson McKee have gained millions of views.

== Early life and education ==
Turner began singing at the age of nine, and began playing guitar five years later, in January 2006. Over the next few years, he became proficient at several other instruments.

In July 2007, he created his YouTube channel, where he began posting covers of popular songs. His first viral video was his cover of "Sultans of Swing" by Dire Straits. As of October 2026, the video has had 14 million views, and his channel more than 779,000 subscribers.

Turner studied music at Butler University, where he also participated in the Butler Chorale, and was music director for the a cappella group Out of the Dawg House. In 2014, his senior year, he appeared on Good Morning America to perform segments of his cover of Paul Simon's song "Graceland"; the clip became popular on YouTube.

== Career ==
In 2018 and 2019, Turner was a cast member in the touring show The Simon & Garfunkel Story and in 2019 starred as Paul Simon in Graceland Live.

Turner released his first full-length solo album, As Good a Place as Any, in April 2019, and his second album, Public Life, on August 7, 2020.

In addition to his solo work, Turner is part of the folk duo The Other Favorites alongside Carson McKee. They released an EP, Fools, in 2017, an original studio album, Naysayer, in 2018, and a live album, Live in London, in 2019. In 2021, the duo released the album Unamericana. Turner and McKee frequently perform in YouTube videos and on tour with singer-songwriter Elle Cordova and Toni Lindgren.

After meeting Allison Young online in 2017, Turner formed a duo with her called The Bygones. On February 10, 2025, the duo announced that they would not be continuing work on the project.

== Discography ==
=== Solo ===
Title	Album details
As Good a Place as Any	Release date: April 2019; Label: Bring Luck Record
Public Life	Release date: August 2020; Label: Bring Luck Records

=== The Other Favorites ===
Title	Album details
Novelty Josh Turner, Carson Mckee	Release date: 2011; Label: The Other Favorites (Self-release)
The Other Favorites (EP) (Josh Turner, Carson Mckee)	Release date: 2012; Label: The Other Favorites (Self-release)
Fools (EP) (Josh Turner, Carson Mckee)	Release date: September 2017; Label: The Other Favorites (Self-released)
Naysayer (Josh Turner, Carson Mckee)	Release date: June 2018; Label: The Other Favorites (Self-released)
Live in London (Josh Turner, Carson Mckee)	Record date: August 20, 2019; Label: Last Triumph
Unamericana (Josh Turner, Carson Mckee)	Release date: November 19, 2021; Label: The Other Favorites (Self-released)

=== The Bygones ===
Title	Album details
May 9–12 (EP) (Josh Turner, Allison Young)	Release date: July 1, 2022; Label: Bring Luck Records
The Bygones (Josh Turner, Allison Young)	Release date: April 4, 2024; Label: Tone Tree

=== Other albums ===
Title	Album details
Josh & Larkin (Josh Turner, Larkin Dodgen)	Release date: March 2014; Label: Josh & Larkin (Self-released)
Armed and Dangerous (Josh Turner, Carson McKee, Bob Barrick)	Release date: April 2017; Label: Kingdom Jasmine

== Most Popular YouTube videos ==
Song	Release date	Instrument	Release Channel	Additional Collaborators	Views (mil)
Sultans of Swing	July 4, 2012	Electric guitar	Josh Turner Guitar	-	14
Stuck in the Middle with You	December 8, 2019	Bass guitar	Josh Turner Guitar	Carson McKee; Elle Cordova; Toni Lindgren	9.4
Folsom Prison Blues	December 8, 2018	Acoustic Guitar	Josh Turner Guitar	Carson Mckee	8.8
Harvest Moon	July 7, 2019	Bass guitar	Elle and Toni	Carson McKee; Elle Cordova; Toni Lindgren	7.7
Take it Easy	May 13, 2017	Electric guitar	Josh Turner Guitar	Carson Mckee	6.4
Sloop John B	November 15, 2018	Electric guitar	Josh Turner Guitar	Alec Hamilton; Ben Cooley; Taylor Bloom; Marc Encabo; Bob Sale	6.1
Sultans of Swing	February 15, 2022	Electric guitar	Mary Spender	Mary Spender	5.4
Crazy	May 11, 2018	Acoustic Guitar	Josh Turner Guitar	Allison Young	5.3
Don't Think Twice, It's All Right	November 9, 2011	Acoustic Guitar	Josh Turner Guitar	Carson Mckee	5.3
Operator	July 7, 2019	Acoustic Guitar	Josh Turner Guitar	Carson McKee; Elle Cordova; Toni Lindgren	4.9
Baby Driver	February 13, 2020	Acoustic guitar	Josh Turner Guitar	Adam Saxe; Ben Cooley; Taylor Bloom; Marc Encabo; Bob Sale	4.4
Acoustic Blues in D	February 3, 2015	Acoustic Guitar	Josh Turner Guitar	-	4.2
Mamma Mia	November 25, 2019	Banjo	Josh Turner Guitar	Carson McKee; Marie	4.0
Can't Help Falling in Love	July 18, 2017	Acoustic Guitar	Amber Taylor Music	Amber Ordaz; Taylor Neita	3.9
Eleanor Rigby	February 14, 2017	Acoustic Guitar	Josh Turner Guitar	-	3.6
Knockin' on Heaven's Door	April 1, 2013	Acoustic Guitar	Josh Turner Guitar	Carson Mckee	3.4
For What It's Worth	July 2, 2019	Electric guitar	Josh Turner Guitar	Alec Hamilton; Ben Cooley; Taylor Bloom; Marc Encabo; Bob Sale	3.3
Sitting on Top of the World	October 10, 2020	Acoustic Guitar	Josh Turner Guitar	Carson Mckee	2.9
Don't Let Me Down	November 18, 2019	Acoustic guitar	Carson McKee	Carson McKee; Elle Cordova; Toni Lindgren	2.9
Feeling Good	August 23, 2015	Acoustic Guitar	Josh Turner Guitar	Larkin Dodgen	2.8
Honky Tonk Women	October 21, 2016	Electric guitar Bass guitar Cowbell; Drums	Josh Turner Guitar	-	2.8
Fever	September 20, 2019	Electric Guitar	Josh Turner Guitar	Allison Young	2.7
The Times They are a-Changin'	January 30, 2017	Acoustic Guitar	Josh Turner Guitar	Carson Mckee	2.7
Lay Down Sally	June 23, 2019	Electric guitar Bass guitar Drums	Josh Turner Guitar	-	2.6
Black Water	November 4, 2022	Acoustic guitar	Josh Turner Guitar	Carson McKee; Elle Cordova; Toni Lindgren; Andrew Foreman	2.6
Paradise	June 28, 2016	Banjo	Josh Turner Guitar	Carson Mckee; Kingdom Jasmine	2.5
