= Rob Chapman (guitarist) =

- Born: Robert Sutherland Chapman; 14 June 1975 (age 50)
- Other names: Chappers
- Occupations: Musician, Youtuber, entrepreneur
- Musical career
- Genres: Progressive metal, heavy metal, hard rock, blues rock
- Instruments: Guitar, vocals
- Years active: 1995–present

Robert Sutherland Chapman (born 14 June 1975) is an English musician, YouTuber, and the founder and co-owner of Chapman Guitars. Chapman is known for his popular instructional YouTube channel and as demonstrator of guitar equipment for Andertons Music Co. He is the lead singer and a guitarist for the blues/Americana band Clockwork Wolf & Co, and was previously the frontman of rock band Dorje.

== Education and early career ==
Chapman began playing the guitar at age 16, and he graduated from The Institute of Contemporary Music Performance in 1995. His musical influences include Joe Satriani, Devin Townsend, Jimi Hendrix, and Soundgarden.

While working day jobs in marketing and accounting, he gigged and worked as a session musician and worked other various music-related jobs, such as transcribing Yngwie Malmsteen's Trial by Fire: Live in Leningrad. In 2006, he posted an instructional video on Myspace that received positive feedback, and he then switched to YouTube to promote his work globally.

== YouTube ==
Chapman is best known for his YouTube channel and video demonstrations on behalf of Andertons Music Co., alongside Anderton's owner, Lee "The Captain" Anderton. He has also worked on demonstrations with Thomann, a Germany-based online music retailer.

== Dorje ==
Chapman started the UK-based rock band Dorje with lead guitarist Rabea Massaad in 2012, and served as its vocalist and rhythm guitarist until it was announced they had disbanded in 2021.

== Clockwork Wolf and Co ==
Chapman is also the frontman and lead guitarist for the Malta-based band, Clockwork Wolf & Co.

== Chapman Guitars ==
During his time spent as a Faith Guitars clinician, Chapman was approached by the director of the parent company Barnes & Mullins, and was offered a signature guitar as part of the Gould brand. Chapman announced this news on YouTube, asking his subscribers what features they would like to see in his signature guitar. The guitar would be named the "ML1" and was the first Chapman product created through collaborative design. Barnes & Mullins decided to launch the guitar through a new venture, Chapman Guitars. 500 units of the ML1 were shipped in April 2010 and sold out.

== Equipment ==
Chapman primarily uses a number of Chapman Guitars, particularly the ML3 Semi-Hollow Traditional. He is also known to play Gibson Les Pauls and Fender Stratocasters, PRS Guitars, Gibson Flying Vs, and Gibson SGs.

Chapman primarily uses Victory Amplification, with whom he has his own signature amp. He is also known to use a plethora of amps from Marshall, Peavey, Orange, and more.

Chapman has also endorsed Ernie Ball, Faith Guitars, Seymour Duncan, Gravity Picks, and Boss.
