= Ash Soan =

British drummer (born 1969)

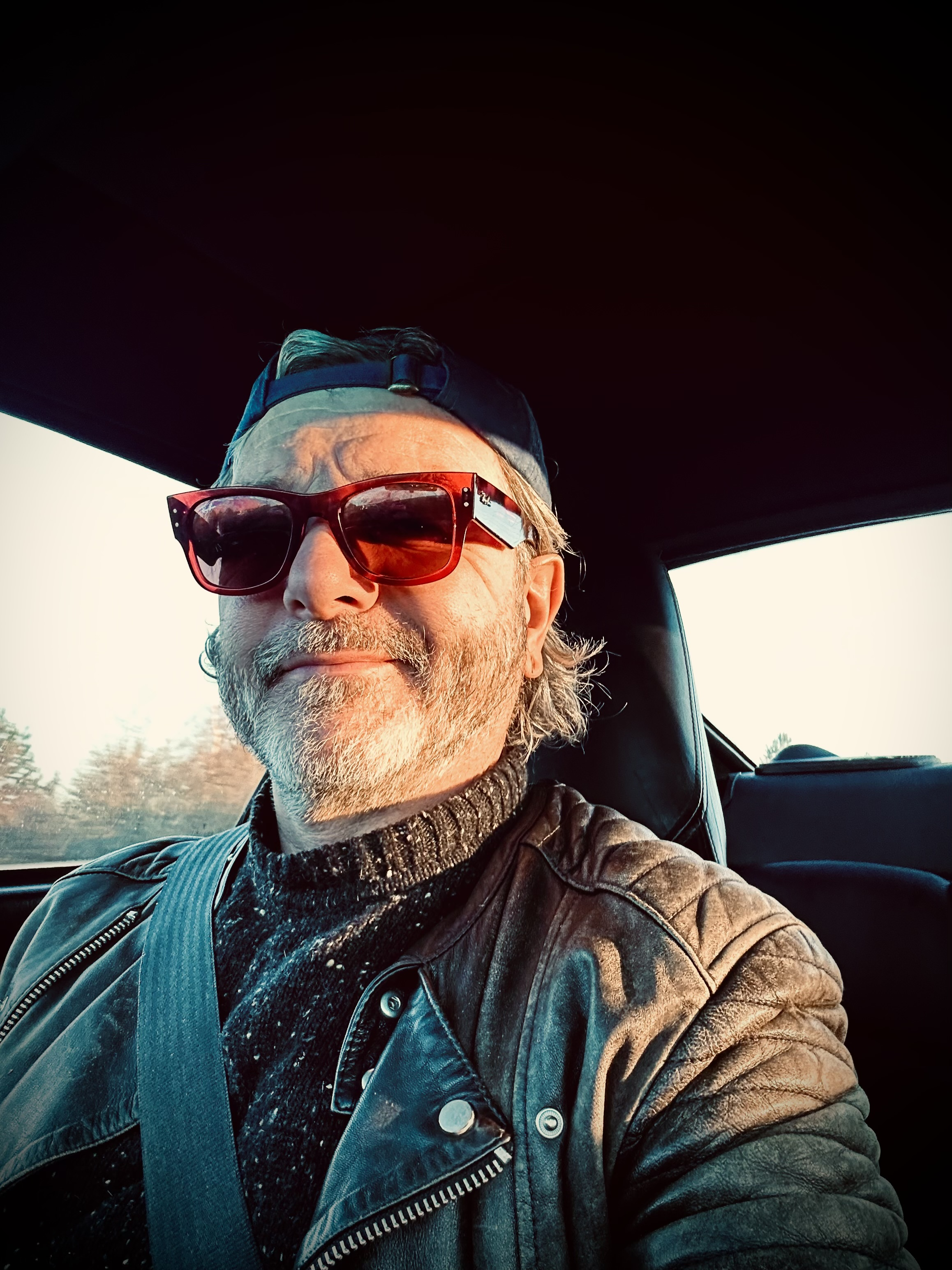
- Soan in 2024

Background information
- Genres: Pop rock, alternative rock, new wave, progressive rock
- Occupation: Drummer
- Years active: 1990s–present
- Member of: Snow Patrol
- Formerly of: Del Amitri, Faithless, Squeeze, Producers/The Trevor Horn Band

Ashley Soan (born 10 December 1969) is a British drummer who is currently playing with Snow Patrol. He has previously played live with Seal, Van Morrison, Bryan Adams, Sinéad O’Connor, Marianne Faithfull, Squeeze, The Waterboys, The Trevor Horn Band, Mike Oldfield, Lisa Stansfield, Terry Reid and Dionne Warwick. He has recorded with Tate McRae, Alicia Keys, Dua Lipa, Cher, Robbie Williams, Billy Idol, Adele, Taylor Swift, Snow Patrol, Celine Dion, Rod Stewart, Seal, Tori Amos and many more.

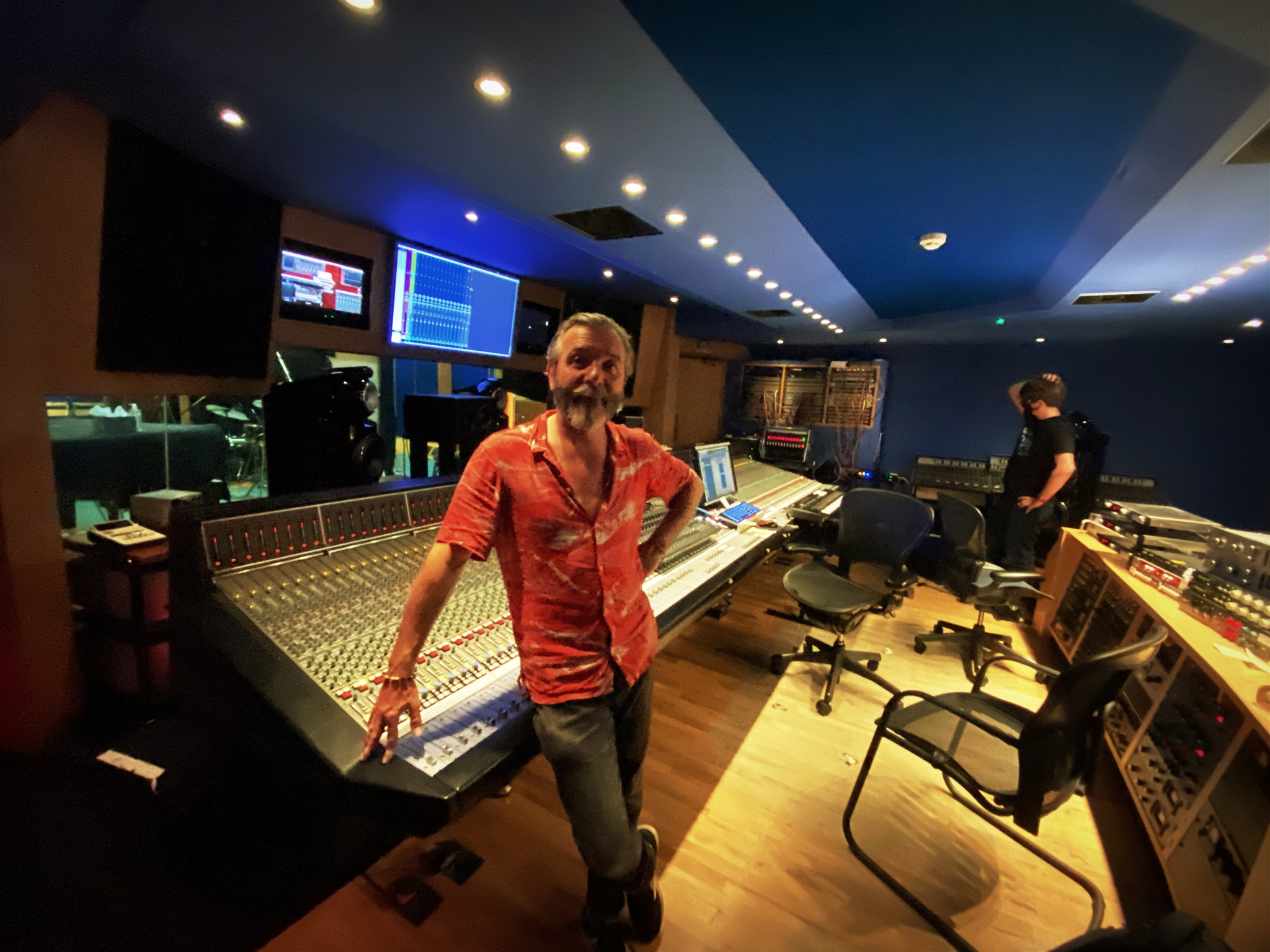
Soan in session at Abbey Road Studios in London.

== Early life and education ==
Born in Dorking, Surrey in England. Educated at the Grove School In Market Drayton, Shropshire, Ashley Soan started having lessons at an early age with Brian Stone. He studied music at Salford University and studied with Dave Hassell then went on to study at Drumtech in Acton in 1991. (now BIMM London & formally Tech Music School) in Fulham, London.

== Career ==
Soan's first break was a short stint with Tom Robinson and then in 1994 joined the band Del Amitri after a recommendation from bass player Pino Palladino whom he met in 1991. He toured and recorded as a member of that band and left Del Amitri in 1997, and subsequently joined Faithless, then went on to tour and record with Squeeze, staying with them until their break-up in 1999.

He has done varied session work since, including touring with Will Young, Tom McRae, Lisa Stansfield, Rick Wakeman, Belinda Carlisle, Chris Difford and Glenn Tilbrook (of Squeeze) and recording with CeeLo Green, Adele, Clare Maguire, Will Young, Delta Goodrem, Vex Red, Robbie Williams including the Robbie Williams and Gary Barlow single "Shame", Enrique Iglesias, Ronan Keating, Marianne Faithfull, Natasha Bedingfield, James Morrison (Songs for You, Truths for Me and the single, "Broken Strings"), Will Young (Let It Go), Alesha Dixon, Boyzone, Dua Lipa and Alicia Keys, Cher, Taylor Swift, Celine Dion and many more.

Soan is a member of Producers/The Trevor Horn Band along with Trevor Horn, Steve Lipson and Lol Creme. He continues to work on further projects produced by Horn, including with Robbie Williams on his November 2009 release, Reality Killed the Video Star. With Horn he also recorded with Billy Idol, Rod Stewart and many more. He also works with Horn's former Buggles partner Geoff Downes, including on the Downes Braide Association's 2017 album Skyscraper Souls. Soan's most recent recording work includes Cher, Billy Idol, Dua Lipa, Taylor Swift, Adele, Seal, Snow Patrol, Tori Amos, Rod Stewart & movie soundtracks for Hans Zimmer & Lorne Balfe including Kung Fu Panda 3, The Lion King 2019, Terminator Genisys, and the Mission Impossible films Fall Out, Dead Reckoning and Final Reckoning.

As of 2020, Soan briefly worked with Del Amitri again having recorded drums for the album Fatal Mistakes, which was released on 28 May 2021.

He played as a member of Tori Amos' band during the 2022-2023 tour for her 16th album, Ocean to Ocean, which was subsequently documented as a live album and released in 2024, titled Diving Deep Live.

Soan currently tours with Snow Patrol having played on their album The Forest Is the Path and touring with them in 2024-2025. Soan will continue touring with Snow Patrol through 2026 and 2027.
