= Academy of Contemporary Music =

Music school in England

Coordinates: 51.23658°N 0.5775°W

The Academy of Contemporary Music
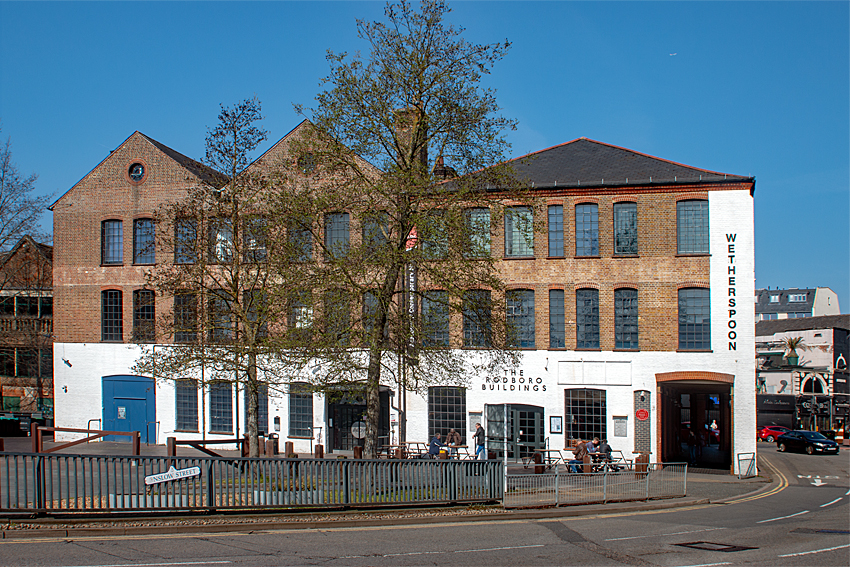
- Rodboro Buildings Campus
- Guildford, Surrey; England

Information
- Type: Music School
- Motto: World Leaders in Music Industry Education
- Established: 1997
- Website: http://www.acm.ac.uk/

The Academy of Contemporary Music (ACM) is a music academy in with campuses in Guildford, Birmingham and London providing contemporary music degrees and postgraduate qualifications, along with other creative industries subjects like games development.

The school of music has a focus on rock, pop music, electronic dance music and a vocational approach. The school has links with Guildford's Electric Theatre, Guildford College, Middlesex University, Metropolis Studios, and University of Surrey.

== History ==
The Academy of Contemporary Music was created by guitar tutor Phil Brookes and Peter Anderton of Andertons Music Co. In the 2000s, the academy partnered with three educational establishments for awarding qualifications: Guildford College which grants BTEC/Edexcel awards for the lower discipline, Middlesex University and the University of Surrey. The latter validate the Certificate in Higher Education for the intermediate discipline, award degrees at BA (Hons) and BMus (Hons) through to an MA (Masters) in contemporary music in partnership with ACM.

In August 2013, ownership of ACM was acquired by Kainne Clements, who also co-owns Metropolis Studios. Since 2013, a partnership with Metropolis Studios developed, which provides the students with practical access to the studio facilities.

In May 2025 ACM was brought under the ownership of Richard Connell, CEO of Metropolis Studios, and Gordon Sweeney, installed as CEO of ACM.

=== Awards ===
In May 2008, ACM was awarded The Queen's Award for Enterprise: Innovation (Technology). In late 2009, with support from the University of Central Oklahoma, ACM opened a base outside of the UK in Downtown Oklahoma City, appointing Scott Booker as executive director.

== Previous students ==
Alumni / former students of ACM (including academic music courses in which vocational placements were made with ACM) include:

- Newton Faulkner, guitarist/singer/songwriter whose album Hand Built By Robots went to number one in the UK Albums Chart.
- Amelle Berrabah, member of The Sugababes.
- Ben King, lead guitarist with The Yardbirds.
- Guy Davis, of rock group Reuben.
- Matty Healy, singer-songwriter of band the 1975, Ivor Novello and Brit Award winner, and two-time Grammy nominee
- Ed Sheeran, singer-songwriter, Ivor Novello, Brit Award and Grammy winner
- Zomboy, dubstep producer
- Ryan Fletcher and Joel Peat of the band Lawson
- Molly Smitten-Downes, singer-songwriter and the United Kingdom's Eurovision Song Contest 2014 entry
- Dominic Lyne, author
- Rabea Massaad, guitarist (Dorje and Toska)
- George Berry, drummer and record producer, Bears in Trees
- Jan-Vincent Velazco, member of Pendragon
- Jamie Irrepressible (founding member) The Irrepressibles
- Nicol River, director of River Music School London
- Theo Lucas, singer-songwriter, represented Cyprus at The Commonwealth in 2023
- Carmen Vandenberg, guitarist (Bones UK, Morrissey)

== See also ==
- List of UCAS institutions
