= Suzi Digby =

British choral conductor and music educator (born 1958)

Suzi Digby OBE
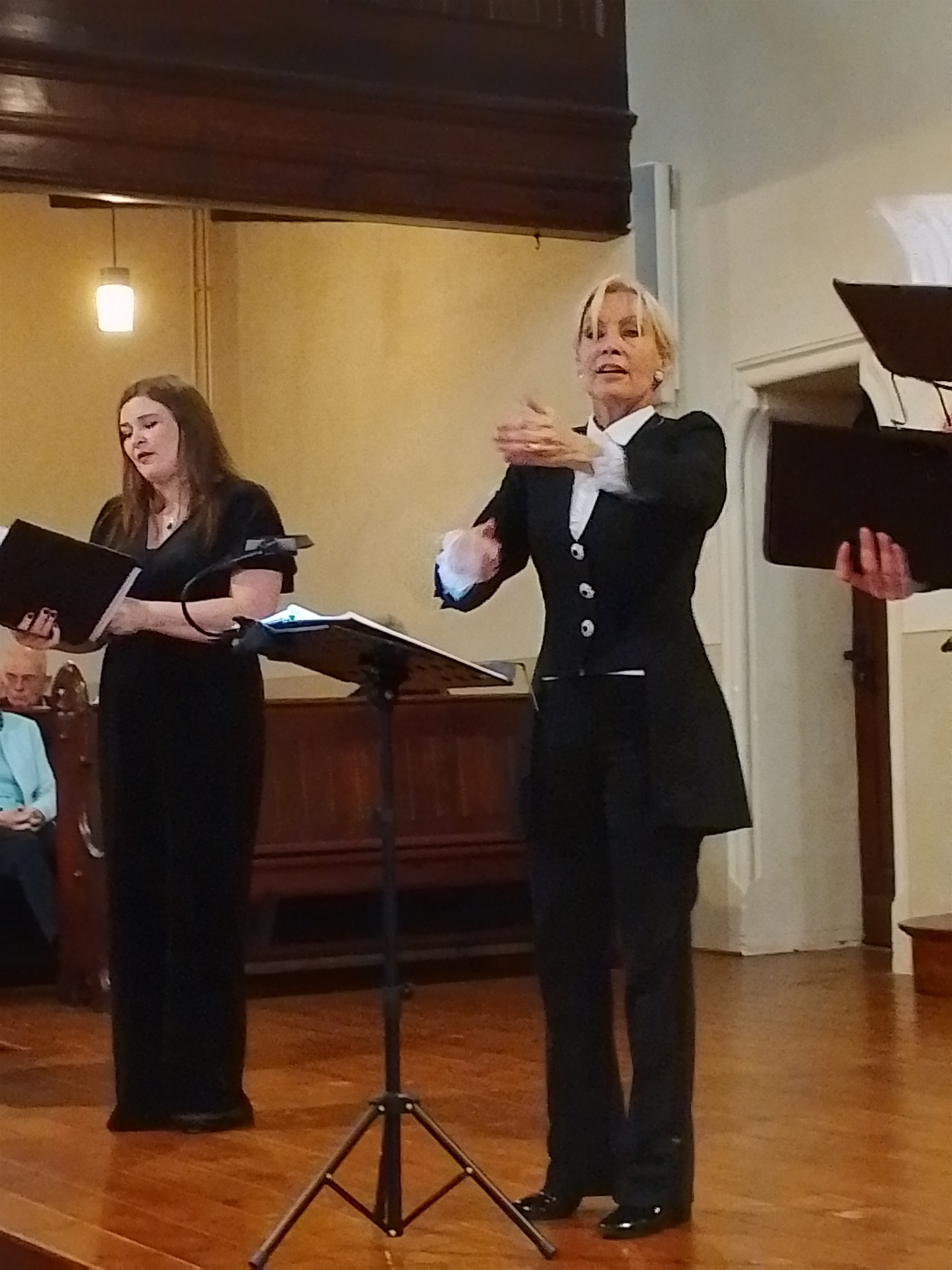
- Suzi Digby in 2025
- Born: Susan Elizabeth Watts; 1 July 1958 (age 68); Japan
- Education: King's College London
- Occupations: Conductor, music educator
- Spouse(s): Henry Noel Kenelm Digby (1980–2001); Lord Eatwell (m. 2006)
- Children: 2
- Website: Official website

Susan Elizabeth Digby OBE (née Watts; born 1 July 1958), known as Suzi Digby, is a British choral conductor and music educator.

== Early life ==
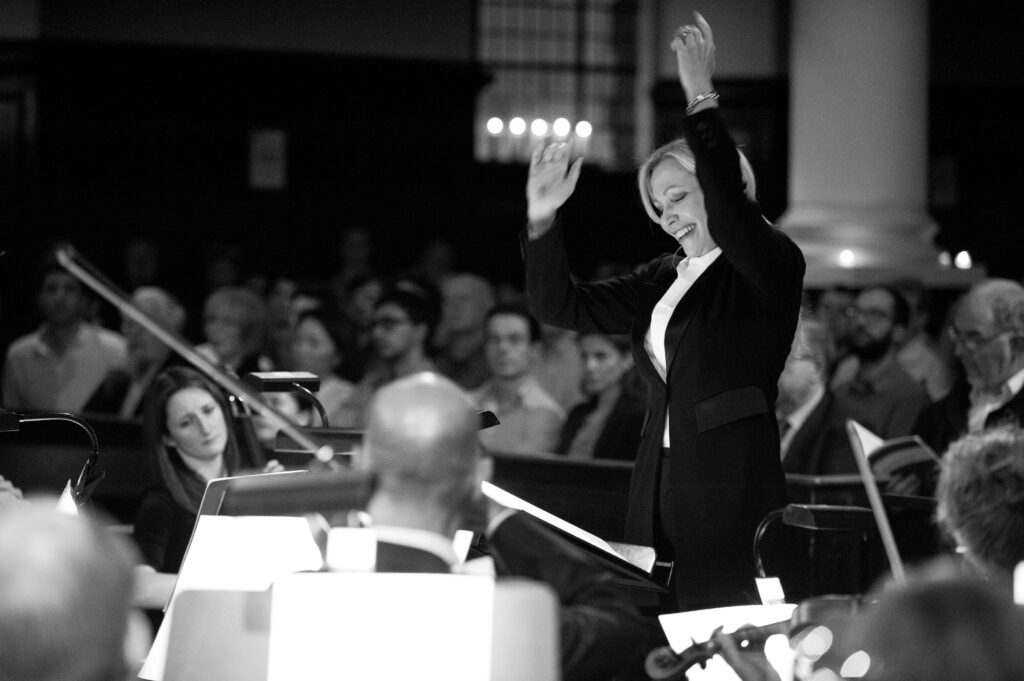
Suzi Digby

Born in Japan as Susan Elizabeth Watts, she attended Francis Holland School, Baker Street, before studying music at King's College London.

She lived in Mexico and the Philippines and then spent 12 years in Hong Kong (1980 to 1992), where she presented the region's first Arts Primetime television series, Art World Presents (ITV World Channel), interviewing visiting Arts celebrities, including Luciano Pavarotti and Andre Previn.

During her time in Hong Kong, Digby was a presenter on RTHK Radio 4 (Classical Music station), the Head of Music DGJS Diocesan Girls' Junior School and taught at The Hong Kong Academy for Performing Arts (HKAPA)

In 1990 she was awarded a Winston Churchill Fellowship, on which she observed and studied in Finland, Hungary, Canada and the US, focusing on methods of choral training and music education.

She also trained with Péter Erdei, head of choral studies at the Franz Liszt Academy of Music in Budapest.

Digby was guest conductor for István Gimnázium Choir and Orchestra (Budapest)

== UK career and choirs ==
Digby is known as a trailblazer for the revival of singing in UK schools and the community over three decades (since 1992). She has founded several pioneering National Arts and Education organisations serving multiple diverse communities throughout the U.K.

Digby founded and directs the professional vocal ensemble, ORA Singers. ORA Singers has commissioned 100 choral works in 10 years (2016 to 2026). Digby is recognised as one of the leading commissioners of new choral music in the world.

She has conducted at many renowned venues and Festivals, including The Royal Albert Hall, St John's Smith Square, the Gstaad Festival, Ambika P3, St Martin in the Fields, St James' Piccadilly, King's College Chapel, Cambridge, O2 London, Glastonbury Festival Pyramid Stage and Hyde Park.

She regularly adjudicates choral competitions and gives workshops and lectures around the world.

=== Voices Foundation ===
1993, Digby founded and ran The Voices Foundation (1993 to 2006), which trained hundreds of thousands of Primary school teachers U.K.-wide, impacting several million children. She acted as Voices Foundation Advisory Teacher, in Primary schools across the U.K.

Hilary Finch, The Times reported the Voices Foundation as giving the Nation back its voice.

=== Musical director ===
1996, Digby was appointed musical director of Rosslyn Hill Chapel Choir in Hampstead, London.

=== Singing Schools ===
In 1998 Digby launched Singing Schools, a five-year program in South Africa involving 70 schools in Soweto and Johannesburg. More than 200 African children's songs have been collected and integrated into the U.K. program.

=== Middlesex Bach Choir ===
In 2000 Digby was appointed director of the Middlesex Bach Choir

=== Winston Churchill Memorial Trust ===
Digby was invited to become a council member of the Winston Churchill Memorial Trust, where she served as chairman of the Arts category. That same year, she was shortlisted for a Creative Britain Award.

Later, after moving to Cambridge, she chaired the Winston Churchill Memorial Trust bursary scheme for Churchill College, Cambridge.

=== Voce ===
2003 Digby founded Voce, one of London's leading amateur chamber choirs.

=== OBE ===
Digby was appointed as an officer of the Order of the British Empire (OBE) for her outstanding services to music education in the 2007 New Year Honours.

=== BBC Last Choir Standing ===
Digby was a judge on the 2008 BBC primetime show Last Choir Standing, featuring 16 episodes with the live final attracting 5.56 million viewers in the UK.

=== Vocal Futures ===
In 2010 Digby founded Vocal Futures, a foundation that set out to identify, involve and inspire young people to engage with live classical music, in particular seminal choral-orchestral works, performed in unusual spaces.

Vocal futures aims to identify, involve and inspire young people (aged 16-22) to begin a lifelong and transformative relationship with classical music: preparing young people for great art, and preparing great art for young people. Our model encompasses education, communication and research, in collaboration with Prof John Sloboda.

Digby's debut with the Orchestra of the Age of Enlightenment (Vocal Futures' Bach, St Matthew Passion) was met with outstanding critical acclaim: "Choral wizard", "The mother of all music", The Telegraph; "Sensitive and accomplished conductor", Musical America; "A serious force for good within Britain's music education system", New Statesman.

Stephen Fry’s response to the St. Matthew Passion:

“The performance of the St Matthew Passion, staged by Patrick Kinmonth and conceived and conducted by Suzi Digby, was one of the most inspirational evenings I can remember.”

Vocal Futures production of Haydn, The Creation (2013) was reviewed by Ivan Hewett (Daily Telegraph, 12th December 2013) as

“There were two forces of nature at this dramatised version of Haydn’s oratorio The Creation. One was Suzi Digby. She was the prime mover behind this latest stage of her campaign to get young people involved in classical music. The other was the work itself. The story of the Creation over seven days is pictured in Haydn’s oratorio with awe-inspiring power, and delightful naivety.”-Ivan Hewett

Following two very successful productions, Vocal Futures presented The Choice, a rarely performed gem in Handel’s repertoire.

The 7-year project culminated in a seminar in Queens’ College, Cambridge, in which Digby and Prof John Sloboda presented their findings to representatives from performing bodies throughout the U.K.

=== University of Southern California ===
From 2011 to 2024 Digby was visiting professor at University of Southern California (USC) Thornton School of Music, delivering lectures for graduate students on the Choral and Sacred Music program.

=== London Youth Choirs ===
Digby co-founded London Youth Choirs in 2012, a pyramid of 10 choirs for children and young adults aged 7 to 23 serving all London's 32 boroughs and multiple communities.

The organisation provides high-calibre musical education and performance opportunities for young singers across London.

=== Independent Society of Musicians ===
Digby was president of the Independent Society of Musicians (ISM) in 2012-13.

=== Rolling Stones 50th Anniversary ===
Digby was the official choral conductor for The Rolling Stones 50th Anniversary 2012. She fixed and coached 70 local choirs for multiple cities for their 50th Anniversary Tour.

Digby performed on stage with Mick Jagger and the Rolling Stones in five concerts at O2, Hyde Park and Glastonbury.

=== Queens' College, Cambridge ===
2013, as acting music director of Queens' College, Cambridge, Digby founded and ran the Queens' Choral Conducting Programme, an annual conducting course for talented Cambridge University undergraduates.

=== Singing4Success ===
Digby founded Singing4Success in 2014, providing leadership and 'Accelerated Learning' and leadership corporate workshops.

=== The Golden Bridge, Los Angeles ===
2014 Digby launched one of the finest professional consorts in California, The Golden Bridge, which commissioned and premièred 40 works by Californian composers to reflect masterpieces of the English 'Golden' Tudor Age and of the European Renaissance.

=== Scratch Youth Messiah ===
Digby conducted 2,000 voices in the Royal Albert Hall in a Scratch Youth Messiah (2015 - 2016) which was awarded first prize for Best Classical Music Education Initiative Nationwide, Classic FM.

=== DMus, University of Aberdeen ===
Digby received an honorary doctorate of music (DMus) from University of Aberdeen in 2016.

=== ORA singers ===
In 2016 Digby founded and directs ORA singers

"ORA Singers' achievement in commissioning and performing 100 new compositions from an impressively wide range of composers must be unprecedented in the entire history of music. It has been an extraordinarily imaginative and generous gift to the composers, and indeed to choirs and audiences everywhere. The repertoire of new choral music has been hugely enriched, and we are all in ORA's debt." - Sir John Rutter

ORA Singers performances and 11 albums (Harmonia Mundi) have received outstanding critical acclaim and have been awarded Germany's Opus Klassik for Best Ensemble of the Year, 2018, and, more recently, the prestigious Jahre Preis der deutschen Schallplattenkritik for the 2023 album, Sanctissima.

== Radio and television appearances ==
Digby has had several appearances on Radio and Television, including on BBC Radio 3 In Tune and Inside Music, and as a judge on the BBC1 hit show Last Choir Standing.

== Personal life ==
Susan Watts married in 1980 The Hon. Henry Noel Kenelm Digby, eldest son of Edward Digby, 12th Baron Digby. She has two children from her first marriage. They divorced in 2001.

In July 2006 she married John Eatwell, Baron Eatwell, then President of Queens' College, Cambridge
