= Elle Cordova =

American singer-songwriter (born 1988)

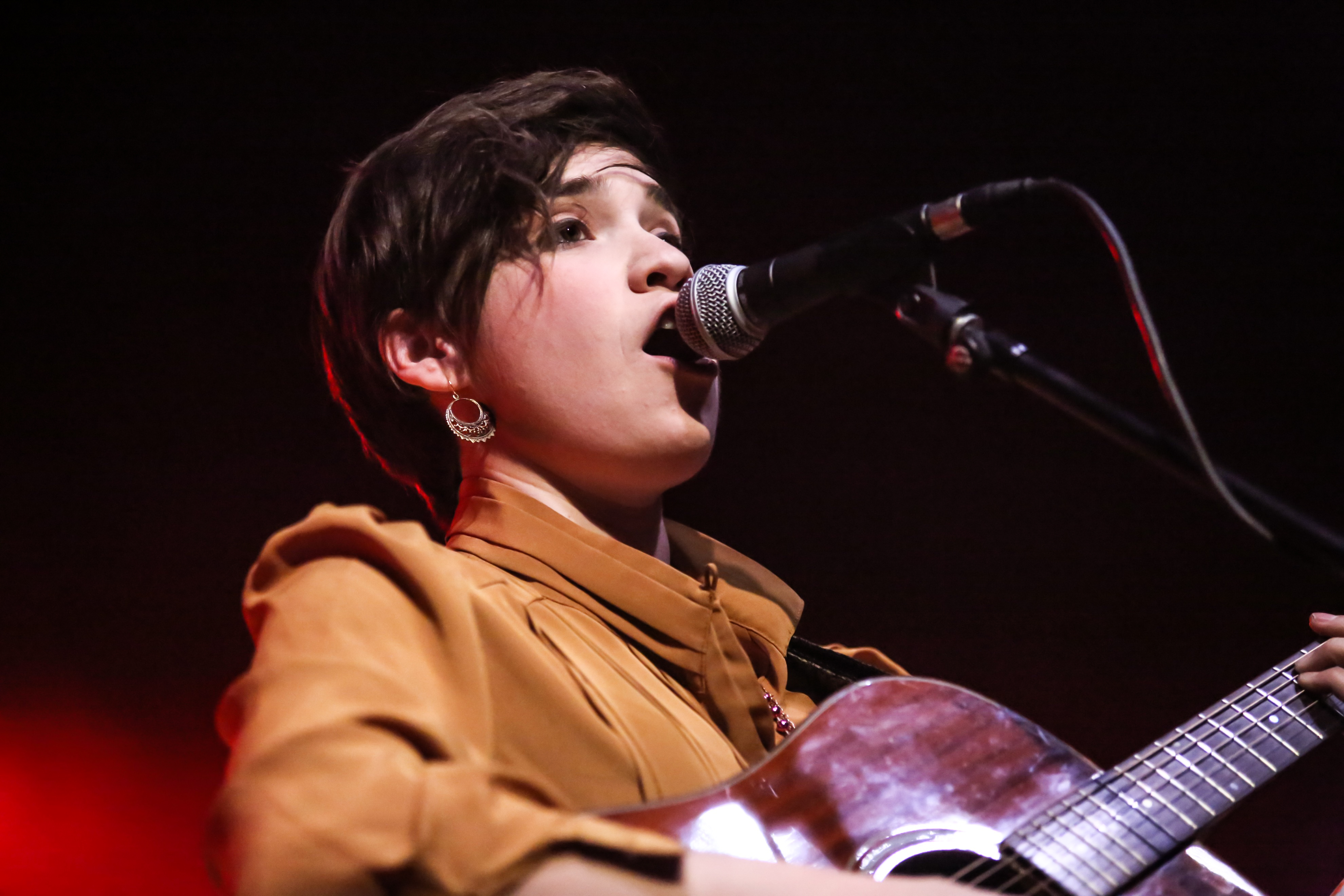
- Cordova performing in Minneapolis in 2018

Background information
- Also known as: Reina del Cid
- Born: Rachelle Cordova; March 8, 1988 (age 38); Fargo, North Dakota, U.S.
- Origin: Minneapolis-St. Paul, Minnesota, U.S.
- Genres: Folk rock; indie folk; indie rock; bluegrass
- Occupations: Musician; singer-songwriter
- Instruments: Vocals; acoustic guitar
- Years active: 2008–present
- Website: ellecordova.com

Rachelle Cordova (/rə.ˈʃɛl/) (born March 8, 1988), known professionally as Elle Cordova and formerly as Reina del Cid, is an American singer-songwriter and lead of the folk rock band Reina del Cid. She is also known for her online comedy sketches, rhyming spoken-word poetry, and videos celebrating literature, space, technology, and nerd culture. She was formerly based in Minneapolis-St. Paul and is now based in Los Angeles.

== Early life and education ==
Cordova was born in Fargo, North Dakota, on March 8, 1988, and earned a Bachelor of Arts degree in English literature from the University of Minnesota – Twin Cities in 2010. After graduating, she worked as an editorial assistant for University of Minnesota Press.

== Career ==
Cordova adopted the name "Reina del Cid" in 2007 for her YouTube channel as a reference to Spanish heroic literature. Having nicknamed her guitar "El Cid" after the Castilian nobleman of that name, she added the name "Reina" ("queen" in Spanish) to become "queen of my guitar".

As Reina del Cid, she gained attention with a residency from 2013 to 2015 at the Amsterdam Bar & Hall in downtown Saint Paul, Minnesota, performing every Monday night for nearly two years.

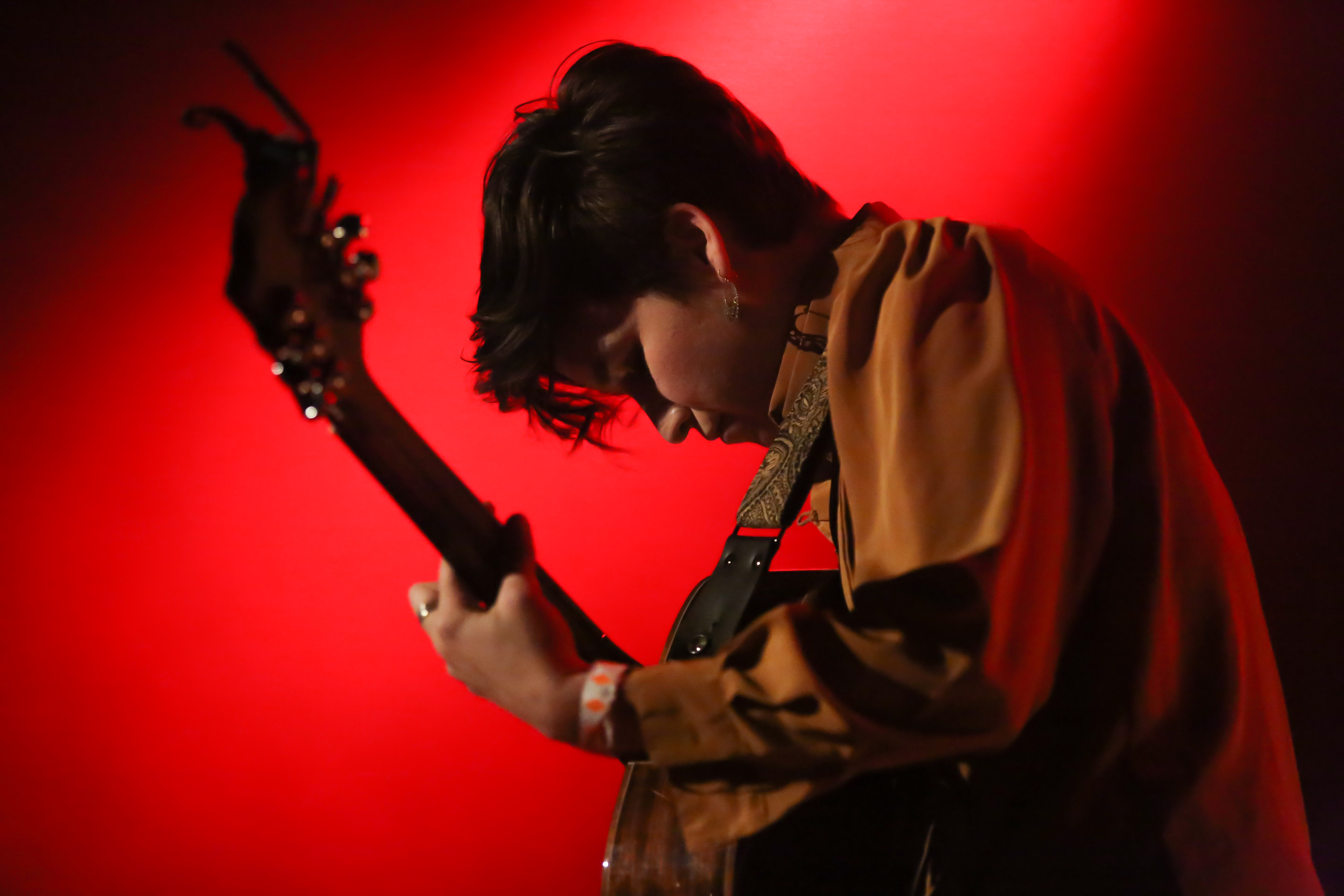
Reina del Cid in 2018

Alongside creative partner and lead guitarist/multi-instrumentalist Toni Lindgren, Cordova has released five full-length studio albums as Reina del Cid: blueprints, plans (credited to "Reina del Cid & the Cidizens"; 2012); The Cooling (2015); Rerun City (2017); Morse Code (2019); and Candy Apple Red (2022).

The Cooling and Rerun City were recorded at Pachyderm Studios. Songs from The Cooling were featured on NPR and Paste, which highlighted the single "Death Cap" and its music video filmed in Iceland. Morse Code was released on October 4, 2019, with a concert at The Cedar Cultural Center in Minneapolis.

Cordova and Lindgren moved to Los Angeles in early 2020. Their fifth studio album, Candy Apple Red, was released on April 28, 2022, with a concert at the Turf Club in St. Paul.

In July 2023, Cordova "reintroduced" herself as Elle Cordova, releasing material under her name to reflect new "songs and poems that feel more personal." As a self-professed "English major nerd with a penchant for sci-fi tv shows", she has released poems, skits, and songs about science, space, sci-fi, and literary themes, some set to hip-hop beats. She launched a YouTube channel under the new name. The Reina del Cid channel was renamed, first to "Sunday Mornings HQ" and then to "Elle & Toni", where Cordova and Lindgren continue to post weekly covers and originals. She said her next album would be an Elle Cordova release, although previous material will retain the Reina del Cid moniker.

In an April 2024 TED Talk, "Poetry and music that reaches across the digital void", Cordova performed her song "Carl Sagan" and explored social media and human connection. TED presented her as a musician known for online comedy sketches, rhyming spoken-word poetry, and videos celebrating literature, space, technology, and nerd culture.

On August 4, 2024, Cordova uploaded to YouTube a cover of Darrell Scott's song "Long Time Gone", and wrote in the description that "We've been a 'long time gone' from this channel temporarily (working on our new album and a few other exciting projects!)".

In January 2025, Elle and Toni ended the Sunday Morning series and started a new one, Full Moon Tunes, in which they post a new cover every full moon.

In March 2025, Cordova's YouTube channel had about 670,000 subscribers, with more than 350 videos and over 187 million combined views. Her Instagram account had over 1.2 million followers.

In October 2026, Cordova announced her album "Curiosities", backed by a Kickstarter campaign and set to release on November 13.

== Political views ==
Cordova supports abortion rights; after the Supreme Court overturned Roe v. Wade, she produced a spin on the American patriotic song "My Country, 'Tis of Thee" criticizing the decision, calling the justices in the majority "six robed dinosaurs".

== Band members ==
- Elle Cordova – lead vocals and rhythm guitar
- Toni Lindgren – lead guitar and backing vocals
- Andrew Foreman – bass
- Nate Babbs – drums
- Zach Schmidt – drums (2014–2018)

== Discography ==
- Let's Begin – EP, self-released 2011 (Credited to Reina Del Cid featuring James Wetzel)
- blueprints, plans – released September 15, 2012 (credited to Reina del Cid & the Cidizens)
- The Cooling – released June 16, 2015
- Rerun City – released December 8, 2017
- Morse Code – released October 4, 2019
- Candy Apple Red – released April 28, 2022
- Curiosities – Album, released November 13, 2026
