= Everything's the Rush =

Studio album by Delays
- Released: 5 May 2008
- Recorded: 2007
- Studio: Space Mountain, Sierra Nevada, Spain; Mayfair, London
- Genre: Indie pop
- Length: 43:40
- Label: Fiction, Polydor
- Producer: Martin "Youth" Glover

Delays chronology
Love Made Visible (2007)	Everything's the Rush (2008)	Star Tiger Star Ariel (2010)

Singles from Everything's the Rush
- 1. "Hooray" Released: 28 April 2008; 2. "Keep It Simple" Released: 11 August 2008

Everything's the Rush is the third studio album by British rock band Delays. It was released on 5 May 2008 through Fiction and Polydor Records. As touring in promotion for their second studio album You See Colours wrapped up in 2006, the band decamped to Space Mountain in Spain with producer Martin "Youth" Glover to work on its follow up. After recording one song at Mayfair Studios in London, recording concluded after 20 days in total. Everything's the Rush is an indie pop album that recalls the sound of their debut studio album Faded Seaside Glamour (2004), with the addition of orchestral elements.

Everything's the Rush received generally favourable reviews from critics, some of whom commented on the musicianship and Gilbert's voice, while others were critical of Youth's production. The album peaked at number 26 on the UK Albums Chart. Preceded by the Love Made Visible EP in late 2007, Delays went on a tour of the United Kingdom to close out the year. They opened 2008 with another UK tour, which led up to the release of the lead single from Everything's the Rush, "Hooray", in April 2008. A third UK tour followed, though some of the shows had to be cancelled due to frontman Greg Gilbert suffering from laryngitis. "Keep It Simple" was released as the album's second single in August 2008, surrounding appearances at various festivals.

== Background and recording ==
Delays released their second studio album You See Colours in March 2006, which peaked at number 24 in the UK Albums Chart. Its two singles "Valentine" and "Hideaway" reached the top 40 in the United Kingdom, with the former charting the highest at number 23. The album's release was promoted with two tours of the UK (bookending either end of the year), and then a stint in the United States with toured the US alongside Franz Ferdinand and the Futureheads. Sessions for the follow-up were held at Space Mountain in Sierra Nevada, Spain, with Martin "Youth" Glover producing and Clive Goddard handling recording; the pair were assisted by Joel Cormack. "Keep It Simple" was recorded at Mayfair Studios in London; recording lasted for 20 days in total.

Discussing the short turnover time, Aaron Gilbert said the band "didn't want to spend 2 days working on a guitar solo or something like that", avoiding the overanalysing that they did for You See Colours. Gilbert liked Youth's previous work with the likes of the Orb, Primal Scream and the Verve. He said the band and Youth worked on a schedule of 11AM to 2AM, where they had a "more Beatles-style ethic with him, so rather than thinking about guitar over-dubs, we did it on the spot". Cenzo Townshend mixed nearly all of the recordings, save for "Pieces", at Olympic Studios with assistance from Neil Comber. Michael Brauer mixed "Pieces" at Quad Studios in New York City, with assistance from Will Hensley, who also served as the Pro-Tools engineer. The album was then mastered by Tim Young.

== Composition ==
Musically, the sound of Everything's the Rush has been described as indie pop, harking back to form of their debut studio album Faded Seaside Glamour (2004), with addition of orchestral elements. Fiona McKinlay of musicOMH said the synthesizer work on You See Colours are "now acting more like a (jolly good) support system for a sunnier band" on Everything's the Rush. Gilbert sung lead vocals on "One More Lie in", "Friends Are False" and "No Contest". Wil Malone arranged the string sections on "One More Lie in", "Pieces" and "Silence", with Perry Montague-Mason as the string leader. Warren Zielinski, Peter Lale, Tony Pleeth and Chris Laurence served as the principals of their respective sections (violin, viola, cello and double bass).

Everything's the Rush opens with the 1980s stadium rock atmosphere of "Girl's on Fire", reminiscent of the work of U2. "Hooray" was the first track Aaron Gilbert wrote after buying a new orchestra synthesizer for his computer; Greg Gilbert added lyrics about OCD, which he deals with. "Love Made Visible" is an electropop track that employs the use of a vocoder; "One More Lie In" deals with being lazy. "Keep It Simple" is a symphonic pop track in the vein of Manic Street Preachers. The ballad "Pieces" evokes the sound of the Verve's Urban Hymns (1997), and is followed by the celtic-esque "Touch Down". The Muse-lite progressive rock of "Friends Are False" recalled the band's own "Stay Where You Are", found on Faded Seaside Glamour, and is followed by the indie disco of "No Contest". The album concludes with the acoustic track "Jet Lag".

== Release ==
On 21 September 2007, Everything's the Rush was announced for release in early 2008. Delays released the Love Made Visible EP on 5 November 2007, which consisted of "Love Made Visible", "Panic Attacks", "Slow Burn", "You See Colours" and a remix of "We Together Make a City". It was promoted with a tour of the UK that same month. In February and March 2008, they went on another UK tour, which was followed by a one-off London show on 6 April 2008. "Hooray" was released as a single on 28 April 2008, a week after its initial planned date; "Chest Out" was included on the CD edition. Two versions were released on 7-inch vinyl: the first with an acoustic version of "Panic Attacks", while the other featured "All Day".

Everything's the Rush was originally planned for release on 28 April 2008, before eventually being released on 5 May 2008. The album's artwork was made by Icelandic artist Siggi Eggertson, who the band showed around Southampton. It was promoted with a UK tour, though some gigs were cancelled due to Gilbert contracting laryngitis. They then appeared at Ben & Jerry's festival in July 2008. "Keep It Simple" was released as a single on 11 August 2008; Ewen MacIntosh starred in the song's music video. Two versions were released on 7-inch vinyl: the first with "Go Slowly", while the other included "One More Lie In (Part 2)". Around the single's release, the band performed at the Wireless, Oxegen, T in the Park and V Festivals. They then played a one-off show in Manchester in October 2008 as part of The Best British Sound: Best of the Festivals concert series. Outtakes from the album were included on the Lost Tunes EP, which was released in December 2008. It consisted of "Christine", "These Days", "Bad Moon Rising" and "Tonight"; the 10-inch vinyl version added an acoustic demo of "Keep It Simple".

== Reception ==
Professional ratings
Aggregate scores
Source	Rating
Metacritic	64/100
Review scores
Source	Rating
AllMusic	3.5/5 stars
Bournemouth Daily Echo	4/5
Drowned in Sound	5/10
Gigwise	4/10 stars
The Guardian	4/5 stars
musicOMH	5/5 stars
Pitchfork	5.7/10
Yahoo! Music	7/10 stars

Everything's the Rush was met with generally favourable reviews from music critics. At Metacritic, which assigns a normalized rating out of 100 to reviews from mainstream publications, the album received an average score of 64, based on seven reviews.

AllMusic reviewer Jon O'Brien saw the album as the band's "most cinematic to date", which sidesteps the majority of their "mid-noughties contemporaries' recent offerings". Kai Jones of Gigwise was highly critical, stating that that album was "so over-laden with giddy, flowery choruses and bouncy Monkees-style verses that the Delays are in danger of turning into a Take That full of Mark Owen". Drowned in Sound's Dom Gourlay said the band "missed a golden opportunity to add something out of the ordinary to their admittedly melodic, if decidedly predictable sound" having Youth as their producer. The Independent music critic Andy Gill wrote that by using Youth, the "already bombastic performances are further expanded with an inflated self-regard that either overwhelms or irritates, depending on one's tolerance". Yahoo! Music writer Jaime Gill, however, criticized Youth's "overbearing production", as "[p]ractically every track comes complete with a distracting and tricksy intro".

Dave Simpson of The Guardian wrote that Greg Gilbert's voice "sound[s] more road-scuffed than before, though this doesn't prevent things occasionally getting too gooey". O'Brien noted that Greg Gilbert's "gutsy falsetto tones -- the band's most distinctive secret weapon -- are kept to a bare minimum", giving way to Aaron Gilbert's on three songs, who "only highlights just how valuable an asset their usual frontman is". Bournemouth Daily Echo writer Lisa Willmot said that the band's "perfect harmonies are still there", while Gilbert's voice "make the record a little quirkier and rougher around the edges". Pitchfork's Ian Cohen, on the other hand, said his "froggy every-bloke accent strips the band of their most distinguishing characteristic".

Everything's the Rush peaked at number 26 on the UK Albums Chart.

== Track listing ==
All tracks by Greg Gilbert and Aaron Gilbert, except where noted.

1. "Girl's on Fire" - 4:26
2. "Hooray" - 3:30
3. "Love Made Visible" - 3:59
4. "One More Lie in" - 3:30
5. "Keep It Simple" - 4:11
6. "Pieces" (G. Gilbert) - 5:29
7. "Touch Down" - 3:09
8. "Friends Are False" - 4:10
9. "No Contest" - 4:06
10. "Silence" (G. Gilbert) - 3:03
11. "Jet Lag" - 4:04

UK bonus track

1. "The Earth Gave Me You" - 4:03

== Personnel ==
Personnel per booklet, except where noted.

Delays

- Greg Gilbert – guitar, vocals
- Aaron Gilbert – keyboard, vocals (tracks 4, 8 and 9)
- Colin Fox – bass
- Rowly – drums

Production and design

- Youth – producer
- Clive Goddard – recording
- Joel Cormack – assistant
- Cenzo Townshend – mixing (all except track 6)
- Neil Comber – assistant
- Michael Brauer – mixing (track 6)
- Will Hensley – mix assistant, Pro-Tools engineer
- Tim Young – mastering
- Big Active – art direction
- Markus Karlsson – design
- Siggi Eggertson – illustration

Additional musicians

- Tim Bran – programming
- Wil Malone – string arranger (tracks 4, 6 and 10)
- Perry Montague-Mason – string leader
- Warren Zielinski – principal 2nd
- Patrick Kiernan – violin
- Boguslav Kostecki – violin
- Jackie Shave – violin
- Chris Tombling – violin
- Jonathan Rees – violin
- David Woodcock – violin
- Mark Berrow – violin
- Emlyn Singleton – violin
- Liz Edwards – violin
- Rita Manning – violin
- Julian Leaper – violin
- Cathy Thompson – violin

Additional musicians (continued)

- Jim McLeod – violin
- Mike McMenemy – violin
- Dai Emanuel – violin
- Tom Pigott-Smith – violin
- Peter Lale – viola principal
- Bruce White – viola
- Rachel Bolt – viola
- George Robertson – viola
- Garfield Jackson – viola
- Ivo Van der Werff – viola
- Tony Pleeth – cello principal
- Dave Daniels – cello
- Caroline Dale – cello
- Ben Chappell – cello
- Chris Laurence – double bass principal
- Paddy Lannigan – double bass

== Charts ==
Chart performance for Everything's the Rush
Chart (2008)	Peak position
UK Albums (OCC)	26
