= Teachers 4: Top of the Class =

Teachers: Top of the Class

Soundtrack album by various artists
- Released: 8 November 2004
- Length: 64:24
- Label: Channel 4

Teachers 4: Top of the Class is the official soundtrack, on the Channel 4 label, of the fourth series of British television comedy-drama series Teachers.

This album contains music by various artists, heard in the show itself.

== Track listing ==
1. "Whatever Happened To Corey Haim?" by The Thrills
2. "I'm Shaking" by Rooney
3. "Oh My Corazon" by Tim Burgess
4. "Just Like Bruce Lee" by Killcity
5. "You And Me Against The World" by Her Majesty
6. "Evil Eye" by Ash
7. "Don't Come Knocking" by The Datsuns
8. "What A Waster" by The Libertines
9. "Stacy's Mom" by Fountains Of Wayne
10. "Together's Better" by Haven
11. "Changes Are No Good" by The Stills
12. "Seems Fine" by The Concretes
13. "You Were Always The One" by The Cribs
14. "Long Time Coming" by Delays
15. "Celebrity Sanctum" by Dogs Die In Hot Cars
16. "You Look So Young" by The Jayhawks
17. "The Day It All Went Wrong" by Gisli
18. "Magic Carpet" by Unisex
19. "Estranged" by The Belles
20. "Misread" by Kings Of Convenience

== Other songs in the show ==
"Cheating on You" by Franz Ferdinand
