= Teachers 2: Back to School =

Teachers: Back To School

Soundtrack album by various artists
- Released: 15 April 2002
- Length: 55:05
- Label: Channel 4

Teachers 2: Back To School is the official soundtrack, on the Channel 4 label, of the second series of British television comedy-drama series Teachers.

This album contains music by various artists, heard in the show itself.

== Track listing ==
1. "Hate To Say I Told You So" by The Hives
2. "Empty At The End" by The Electric Soft Parade
3. "Lucky Charm" by The Apples in Stereo
4. "Poor Misguided Fool" by Starsailor
5. "Doping For Gold" by Preston School of Industry
6. "Eight Track" by Fonda 500
7. "Value Of Life" by Cosmic Rough Riders
8. "Distant Sunshine" by Kid Galahad
9. "We Can't Rewind" by Feeder
10. "Kit & Holly" by Echoboy
11. "Slack" by Turin Brakes
12. "You're My Queen" by Mercury Rev
13. "To You" by I Am Kloot
14. "Drop & Roll" by Simian
15. "Apple Of My Eye" by Ed Harcourt
