= Teachers: A Class Soundtrack =

Soundtrack album by Various artists
- Released: 15 September 2001
- Length: 69:48
- Label: Channel 4

Teachers : A Class Soundtrack is the official soundtrack, on the Channel 4 label, of the first series of British television comedy-drama series Teachers.

This album contains music by various artists, heard in the show itself.

== Track listing ==
1. "Buck Rogers" by Feeder
2. "Catch the Sun" by Doves
3. "Can't Say No" by Lowgold
4. "Get a Move On!" by Mr Scruff
5. "Le Mobilier" by Rinôçérôse
6. "When I Close My Eyes" by Morgan
7. "She Left Me On Friday" by Shed Seven
8. "I Wanna Be Like You" by The Dandys
9. "The Day Before Yesterday's Man" by The Supernaturals
10. "Move Over" by Mover
11. "Little Arithmetics" by Deus
12. "Animal House" by Animal House
13. "Sudwest Funk No. 5" by Echoboy
14. "Indigo" by Moloko
15. "Insomnia" by Faithless
16. "Utopia" by Goldfrapp
