= It Doesn't Matter Anymore (disambiguation) =

"It Doesn't Matter Anymore" is a song written by Paul Anka and recorded by Buddy Holly.

It Doesn't Matter Anymore may refer to:

- It Doesn't Matter Anymore (album), by The Supernaturals
- "It Doesn't Matter Anymore", a song by Puressence from the album Only Forever
- "(You Know) It Doesn't Matter Anymore", a song by Daryl Hall & John Oates from their self-titled album

== See also ==
- It Doesn't Matter (disambiguation)
