= Teachers 3: A New Term =

Teachers: A New Term

Soundtrack album by various artists
- Released: 2 December 2002
- Length: 57:07
- Label: Channel 4

Teachers 3: New Term is the official soundtrack, on the Channel 4 label, of the third series of British television comedy-drama series Teachers.

This album contains music by various artists, heard in the show itself.

== Track listing ==
1. "Come Back Around" by Feeder
2. "The Bitter End" by Placebo
3. "Evening of the Day" by Supergrass
4. "Beautiful" by Athlete
5. "Fractions and Feeling" by Stephen Malkmus
6. "Natalie and Nucy" by Papa Garcia
7. "Pack It In" by Kid Galahad
8. "Up the Bracket" by The Libertines
9. "Get Free" by The Vines
10. "You Got My Number" by The Jeevas
11. "A Modern Way of Letting Go" by Idlewild
12. "I Live for Speed" by Star Spangles
13. "Good to Me" by Brendan Benson
14. "Jerk It Out" by Caesars
15. "Stuck on the Street at Minus Ten" by Basement
16. "Take It Off" by The Donnas
17. "Bigger Wheels" by I Am Kloot
18. "21st Century Rip Off" by Soundtrack of Our Lives
