= Greg Gilbert (musician) =

British musician (1976–2021)

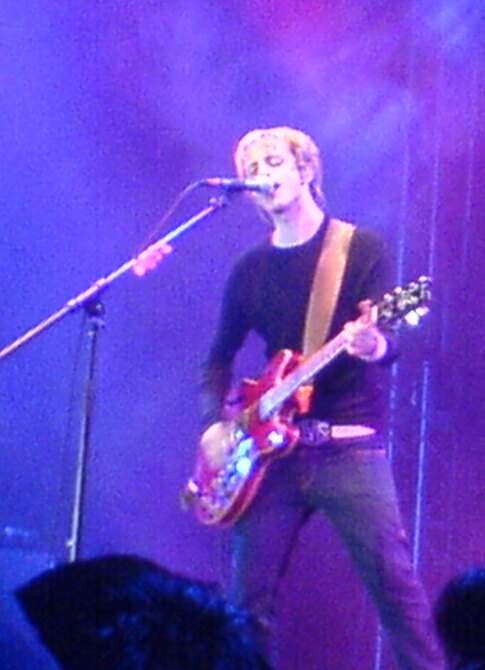
- Greg Gilbert performing with Delays in 2006
- Born: Greig Francis Gilbert; 7 December 1976; Southampton, England
- Died: 30 September 2021 (aged 44); Southampton, England
- Occupations: Musician; singer; songwriter; visual artist; poet
- Spouse: Stacey Heale (m. 2018)
- Children: 2
- Musical career
- Genres: Dream pop; Indie pop; Indie rock
- Instruments: Vocals; guitar
- Labels: Rough Trade Records; Fiction Records; Lookout Mountain Records
- Formerly of: Delays

Greig Francis "Greg" Gilbert (7 December 1976 – 30 September 2021) was a British musician, singer, songwriter, visual artist and poet. He was best known as the lead singer and guitarist of indie band Delays. One of the band's defining characteristics was Gilbert's wide vocal range; the regular use of his upper register became Gilbert's trademark singing style. His vocals were often compared to those of Elizabeth Fraser and Stevie Nicks.

Gilbert was born in Southampton as the eldest of two children. His brother Aaron joined Delays in 2003 as their keyboard player and co-writer on many of the band's tracks.

== Music ==
Gilbert started his musical career as the frontman of a band named Corky, who eventually rebranded as Idoru and released the EP Safety in Numbers in 2001. Despite his initial reluctance to get up on stage, Gilbert realised that it was necessary in order to get his career going. "I had to get on the stage out of necessity. I found it terrifying. I still do find it terrifying but I realised that when you get over that, it's one of those things that you'll be forever glad you did", Gilbert stated in 2013. In 2003, the band switched to their present name Delays and started to gain traction when they were signed by Geoff Travis of Rough Trade Records, who was impressed by the band after attending one of their private shows. The other members of Delays are Greg's brother Aaron Gilbert (keyboards), Colin Fox (bass) and Rowly (drums and percussion). Greg met Colin and Rowly at school. Aaron joined the band halfway through the recording process of the debut album after Greg heard him play a loop.

The band's debut album Faded Seaside Glamour was released on 5 April 2004 and peaked at number 17 in the UK Albums Chart. Eventually the album was certified Silver and all of its accompanying singles ("Long Time Coming", "Nearer Than Heaven" and "Hey Girl") charted within the Top 40 of the UK Singles Chart. Faded Seaside Glamour was produced by Duncan Lewis, Graham Sutton and Delays. The band recorded the album in three months at Rockfield Studios in Rockfield, Monmouthshire, Dustsucker Sound in Hackney, London, and Moles Studio in Bath, Somerset. The album's sound was described as dream pop, jangle pop and indie pop and critics began to compare it to the works of bands such as Cocteau Twins, Geneva, The La's and The Byrds, singling Gilbert's distinctive voice out as a highlight. Following the release, the band toured the UK and Europe and also toured the US for the first time. The band also went on to support Franz Ferdinand, Manic Street Preachers and Snow Patrol at their headlining shows.

In November 2004, Delays released the non-album single "Lost in a Melody" as a double A-side with Faded Seaside Glamour's opening track "Wanderlust". "Lost in a Melody" featured a more hard-edged electronic sound that marked a new direction for the band. The single charted at #28 in the UK Singles Chart.

Delays originally intended to release a second album called Action Reaction in April 2005. However, the project never materialised due to the fact that Aaron Gilbert lost the only copy of the disc, containing roughly 100 demos written by Greg during their Faded Seaside Glamour tour.

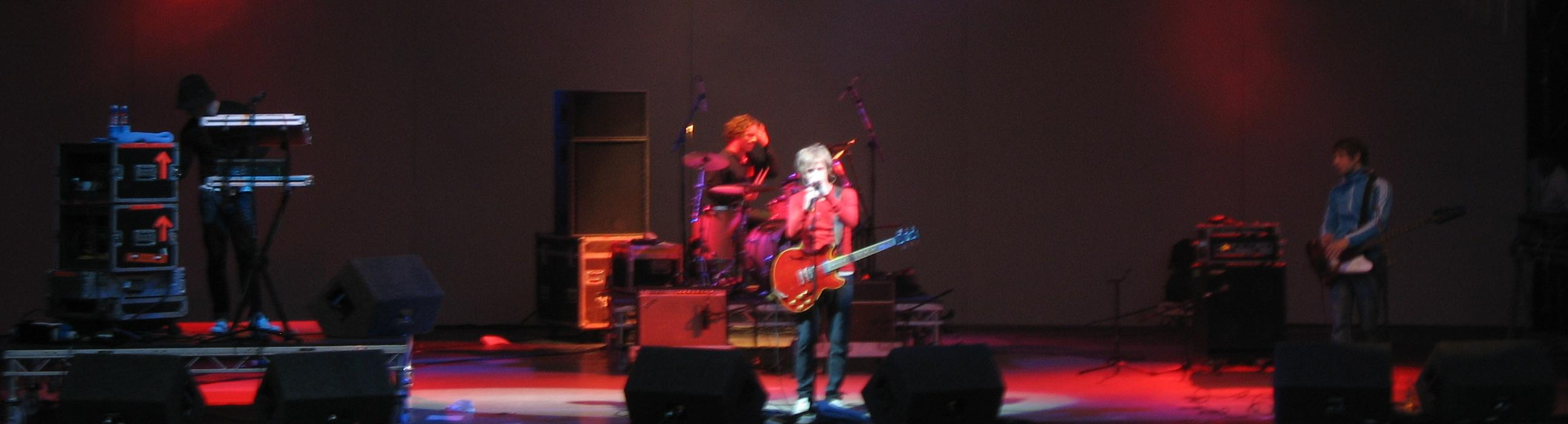
Gilbert performing with Delays at Summer Sundae

The eventual second album You See Colours was released in March 2006 through Rough Trade Records and featured a more synth-driven and up-tempo sound. This new direction was described by Delays as a natural progression, given that keyboardist Aaron joined the band halfway through the writing process of Faded Seaside Glamour. You See Colours was produced by Graham Sutton and charted at number 24 in the UK Albums Chart. The disco-inspired "Valentine" was released as the lead single. Producer Trevor Horn provided additional arrangement and vocal overdub on the track, which was performed on Top of the Pops on 27 February 2006. Horn would later cite the Delays track "Stay Where You Are" from Faded Seaside Glamour as the inspiration for the bass riff on "Bodies", which he produced for Robbie Williams. "Valentine" was shortlisted for the Popjustice £20 Music Prize in 2006, an annual prize to recognise the best British pop single of the year. The single peaked at number 23 in the UK Singles Chart. The second single from You See Colours, "Hideaway", was released on 9 May 2006 and peaked at number 35 in the UK Singles Chart. You See Colours was accompanied by another UK tour before playing a series of festival shows across Europe.

On 5 May 2008, Delays released their third studio album Everything's the Rush through Fiction Records after having parted ways with Rough Trade. The album peaked at number 26 on the UK Albums Chart. The release was preceded by the Love Made Visible EP in late 2007, which consisted of "Love Made Visible" (for which a music video was filmed), "Panic Attacks", "Slow Burn", "You See Colours" and a remix of "Love Made Visible" titled "We Together Make a City". The band promoted the EP with a UK tour, followed by another tour to promote the album in 2008 as well as supporting Crowded House on their tour. Everything's the Rush, which was produced by Martin "Youth" Glover, featured more maximalist production than previous efforts and also incorporated orchestral elements. Vocally, the focus shifted from highlighting Greg's falsetto on its predecessor You See Colours to a bigger emphasis on his lower range, as well as having Aaron sing lead vocals on three songs. The tracks "Hooray" (which featured lyrics about Gilbert's struggle with Obsessive–compulsive disorder) and "Keep It Simple" were released as singles. Delays released the Lost Tunes EP in December 2008, featuring outtakes from the album.

In June 2010, Delays released their fourth album Star Tiger Star Ariel on the label Lookout Mountain Records, with "Unsung" as the lead single. The album was heavily inspired by Southampton and driving around the New Forest National Park. Gilbert said "The first album sounded like the sun, the second album like a club, 'Everything's The Rush' was a festival, but this album sounds like roots beneath the city shaking the buildings at night. This record is about being lost, and the dream of being found. It is our most personal record, and, more than anything, is a soundscape for our home." Later in the year, the band embarked on another UK tour. Gilbert stated in 2013 that he considered Star Tiger Star Ariel to be the best Delays album.

While Delays were on hiatus, Gilbert started his side project The Lunar Fields with ex-members of Liverpool's The Maybes and The Sums. Although the band didn't release any of their tracks officially, some of them were uploaded on YouTube and SoundCloud in 2012.

In 2014, Gilbert toured the UK with Delays for the last time to mark the 10th anniversary of Faded Seaside Glamour. This was the first and only time the band played the album in its entirety. One of Gilbert's final wishes was a vinyl release of the band's first album Faded Seaside Glamour. The LP was released on 27 January 2023 and charted at #2 in the UK Vinyl Chart.

== Visual art ==
In 2013, Gilbert started to gain acclaim and accolades for his work as a visual artist. While he had always been passionate about creating art and attended Winchester School of Art in 1995 with the intention of becoming a conceptual designer for film, his main focus had been music until Delays decided to go on hiatus after the Star Tiger Star Ariel era due to family commitments. His initial signature style consisted mainly of biro miniatures, biro reliefs and pencil drawings. In March 2013, Gilbert's first exhibition, Requiem for a Village, was held at Harbour Lights Picture House in Southampton's Ocean Village. It was inspired by family photos, knitting patterns and postcards from the 1970s. He won the Beaulieu Fine Arts Award with his piece Affinities 1 in his first year of going public with his art. In the same year, he also won the award for being the "Best in the South of England" at a private view of the National Open Art Competition. Many exhibitions in numerous art galleries would follow, including the large solo exhibition Through Sand in 2015 and A Gentle Shrug into Everything, an exhibition at Southampton Art Gallery in 2019. Following his cancer diagnosis, Gilbert decided to move away from his signature biro miniature style due to its physically draining nature. He began to focus on different kinds of visual art, such as sculptural drawings, convalescent drawings and abstract acrylic paintings.

== Poetry ==
Around the time Gilbert started to show his art, he also began writing poetry. It eventually became a bigger focus for him as it served as a way of dealing with his illness and documenting his journey. He decided to explore the Southampton poetry scene and had some pieces of poetry published in an anthology, despite having been self-conscious about it initially. Eventually he met Gillian Clarke (the former National Poet of Wales) at a reading at The Brook in Southampton, who thought Gilbert's work should be published due to the importance of documenting his journey with a life-threatening illness. Clarke passed on some of Gilbert's work to Poet Laureate Carol Ann Duffy without him being aware of it. As it turned out, Duffy was interested in reading more of his work and contacted Gilbert. Gilbert's first collection of poems, Love Makes a Mess of Dying, was published in 2019. The pamphlet was selected by Carol Ann Duffy for the 2019 Laureate's Choice series.

== Personal life ==
In November 2016, Gilbert was diagnosed with stage 4 bowel cancer, secondary lung. He was told that he was genetically incompatible with the only free immunotherapy drug available on the National Health Service and that treatment options were limited. Considering that the treatment that could potentially save or prolong his life (which would also match his gene profile) was not available on the NHS, his long-term partner Stacey set up a fundraiser, aiming to crowdfund £100,000 for Gilbert's medical treatment. The crowdfunding campaign became the fastest fundraiser to hit its target on the giving site by passing its original target in 48 hours and eventually raised more than £215,000 to pay for his medical treatment.

Gilbert died on 30 September 2021, aged 44. He is survived by his wife, Stacey Heale (whom he married in August 2018), and their children, Dalí and Bay.
