= A Tune a Day =

Studio album by The Supernaturals
- Released: August 1998
- Recorded: CaVa, Trident, Chapel, Chipping Norton
- Genre: Indie rock, Britpop
- Length: 47:17
- Label: Parlophone/Food Records
- Producer: Pete Smith

The Supernaturals chronology
It Doesn't Matter Anymore (1997)	A Tune a Day (1998)	What We Did Last Summer (2002)

A Tune a Day is the second album by Scottish Britpop band the Supernaturals on the Food Records branch of the Parlophone label.

Three singles were released from the album, the first of which, "I Wasn't Built to Get Up", peaked at number 25 in August 1998, making them the only citizens of Milngavie to clock up five appearances in the top 40. The follow-up singles "Sheffield Song" and "Everest" didn't break the top 40. The album itself peaked at number 21 in August 1998 and received some positive reviews (7/10 NME and 4/5 Q) which were supported by festival appearances and several headlining tours, and a 30 date UK Arena and European tour with solo singer Robbie Williams and Irish band the Divine Comedy. "I Wasn't Built to Get up" was used in an advertising campaign for Direct Debits on UK television in 1999. The song "Monday Mornings" was used in the film Fast Food in 1999. In November 1998 The Herald claimed it had been "a triumphant past 12 months for oor ain Supernaturals, those masters of perky power-poptasticality".

== Recording ==
A Tune a Day was recorded at various studios in the UK: Cava, Chapel, Chipping Norton, Jacobs and Trident. Sessions were helmed by producer Pete Smith; Geoff Allan, Ben Darlow, Barry Hammond and Graeme Stewart served as engineers. The album was mixed by Smith with Darlow, before it was mastered by Geoff Pesche at Townhouse Studios in London.

== Critical response ==
The Independent reviewed the album as "rather weak and enervated, the inevitable consequence of continuing to subscribe to the Britpop formula after the genre's appeal has curdled... demonstrates facility without taste". The Irish Times was more positive, commenting that "for the Supernaturals, A Tune a Day is less a title than a manifesto". The List commented that the album was "more melancholy than [their] debut" album. Hot Press noted the style as "pretty much Britpop writ if not quite large then in italics" and "The Supernaturals is a rather ironic name for a band who are so ordinary. They are, essentially, your average white indie guitar band, only with more jokes and a sense of self-awareness... At times this modesty serves them well and brings you over to their side; but sometimes it just makes them seem stultifyingly unambitious". XS NOIZE asked if you "crossed a hint of Blur's upbeat mid 90s output with a Scottish-flavoured twist of The Beach Boys and their sunny melodies? You’d probably end up with something a bit like The Supernaturals." Back Seat Mafia described "a hidden gem of an album.. 'I Wasn't Built to Get Up', with its memorable chorus and universally understandable message, was exactly the right choice of first single to promote the album, despite the band and record label being spoilt for choice. Songs like 'You Take Yourself Too Seriously', 'Idiot', and 'Let Me Know' were glorious slabs of melody-heavy power pop, while album apex 'Sheffield Song' confirmed just how far The Supernaturals had developed since their debut."

== Track listing ==
All tracks written by James McColl, except track 2 by McColl, Derek McManus and Alan Tilston, and tracks 12–14 by McColl and Ken McAlpine.

1. "You Take Yourself Too Seriously" – 2:38
2. "Monday Mornings" – 3:00
3. "Submarine Song" – 4:19
4. "I Wasn't Built to Get Up" – 3:26
5. "Country Music" – 3:01
6. "Motorcycle Parts" – 3:12
7. "Sheffield Song" – 3:08
8. "VW Song" – 3:58
9. "Idiot" – 3:18
10. "Magnet" – 3:24
11. "Still Got That Feeling" – 3:09
12. "Let Me Know" – 2:53
13. "It Doesn't Matter Any More" – 3:21
14. "Everest" – 4:30

== Personnel ==
Personnel per booklet.

The Supernaturals

- James McColl – vocals, guitar
- Derek McManus – guitar
- Ken McAlpine – keyboards
- Mark Guthrie – bass
- Alan Tilston – drums

Production and design

- Pete Smith – producer, mixing
- Geoff Allan – engineer
- Ben Darlow – engineer, mix engineer
- Barry Hammond – engineer
- Graeme Stewart – engineer
- Geoff Pesche – mastering
