= Stealin' Beats EP =

EP by Kid Galahad
- Released: 28 May 2001
- Genre: Indie
- Length: 16:17
- Label: Ignition
- Producer: Jim Abbiss/Kid Galahad/Chris Leckie

Kid Galahad chronology
Stealin' Beats EP (2001)	Where's my Gold? EP (2001)

Stealin' Beats EP was the debut release from British band Kid Galahad. The band changed their name in 2006 and are now known as The Furze. The title track "Stealin' Beats" was recorded in the studio and produced by Jim Abbiss who had previously worked with artists such as UNKLE and DJ Shadow. "Days" and "Nefarious" were both recorded live, in order to showcase the band's acclaimed live performances. "Watching the Sun Go Down" was a demo recording made in lead singer Ash's back garden, and includes authentic bird and aeroplane sounds.

The EP was generally well received and was made "single of the week" by NME magazine and BBC Radio One. "Stealin' Beats" was also used in the PlayStation 2 game Dancing Stage MegaMix, which has sold more than 500,000 copies worldwide. The same song featured the UK Channel 4 comedy drama Teachers.

== Track listing ==
All tracks written by A. Bull, D. Ody, P. Seaman, D. Strows

1. "Stealin' Beats" – 4:03
2. "Days" – 4:16
3. "Nefarious" – 3:57
4. "Watching the Sun Go Down" – 4:02

== Personnel ==
- Ash Bull – vocals
- Dave Ody – guitar
- Paul Seaman – bass guitar
- D. "Wookie" Strows – drums
- Jim Abbiss – production and mixing (Track 1)
- Chris Leckie – recording (Track 3)
- Kid Galahad - production (Tracks 2 and 4)
