= The Supernaturals =

Scottish indie rock band

- Promotional photo of the Supernaturals

Background information
- Origin: Glasgow, Scotland
- Genres: Indie rock, Britpop, power pop
- Instruments: Guitar, keyboard, bass, drums
- Years active: 1993–2002, 2012–present
- Labels: Parlophone, Food, Koch
- Members: James McColl; Mark Guthrie; Gavin Crawford; David Currie; Joseph Greatorex
- Past members: Alan Tilston; Ken McAlpine; Derek McManus; Steve Jeffrey; Sean Guthrie; Paul Malcolm

The Supernaturals are a guitar-based indie rock band from Glasgow, Scotland. Fronted by singer-songwriter James McColl, the band signed to Parlophone in 1996, and had a string of singles which were taken from their three albums and four EPs. Other members included Mark Guthrie, Derek McManus, Gavin Crawford and Ken McAlpine. The band's best known songs ("Smile" and "I Wasn't Built To Get Up") were featured prominently in a series of television advertisements. In total they scored five top 40 entries in the UK Singles Chart. The band broke up in 2002, before reforming in 2012, and they continue to record music, and perform concerts, to this day.

== Career ==
The band was formed in 1991 by Derek McManus (guitar), James McColl (guitar/vocals), Gavin Crawford (drums) and Mark Guthrie (bass). Their first release, on cassette, was "Big 7" in 1992 followed by "Dark Star" in early 1993. The band toured extensively around Scotland, selling copies of "Big 7" and "Dark Star" and building a fanbase. Ken McAlpine joined the band in early 1994 on keyboards with Sean Guthrie and Steve Jeffrey sitting in as his replacement on keyboards occasionally. The band often played long sets and featured many impromptu cover versions of songs by bands such as the Move, the Replacements and the Monkees. While still unsigned, they released the CD album Sitting in the Sun in 1994 and played at the Sound City Festival in Glasgow with the Trashcan Sinatras in April 1994. They followed this up with "Let it Bleat" in 1995. Gavin Crawford (drums) left the band in 1995 to be replaced by Alan Tilston. By mid 1995 The Supernaturals played unsigned at the Phoenix Festival and T in the Park. Having come to the attention of Andy Ross of Food Records in 1995, they were signed to Food/EMI in November 1995.

The band spent early 1996 recording their debut album with producer Pete Smith and played gigs supporting Dodgy (on their Big Top Tour), Tina Turner, Sleeper, Menswear, the Bluetones and Ash. The band's second release on Food, "Lazy Lover" was supported by a large UK tour with Silver Sun and Grasshow in late 1996. The band's next release "Day Before Yesterday's Man" was in January 1997 and the band toured with the Boo Radleys and Gene. They re-released "Smile" in April 1997 and their debut album It Doesn't Matter Anymore was released in May 1997. Smile was a success in Japan with the album staying on the chart in Japan for 12 weeks. The band toured Europe and the UK with Robbie Williams in late 1997. After spending early 1998 recording with Pete Smith, they released their second album A Tune a Day (named after the music instruction books) in August 1998 and three singles were released from the album, "I Wasn't Built to Get Up", "Sheffield Song" and "Everest". This was supported by festival appearances and several headlining tours and a 30 date UK Arena and European tour with Robbie Williams and the Divine Comedy in early 1999.

The band left Food/EMI Records in late 1999. They recorded their third album What We Did Last Summer in Glasgow in 2000 and released it on Koch/Universal in May 2002. Mark Guthrie left the band in December 2000 and Ken McAlpine left the band in July 2001. They were replaced by David Mitchell (keyboards) and Paul Malcolm (guitars) with James McColl switching to bass. To support the release of the album the band toured around the UK and with the Proclaimers in late 2001 and made several appearances at festivals to support the album. The band's first single from the album "Finishing Credits" was on a list of song banned by the BBC in the wake of the 9/11 attacks due to the phrase "It's the end of the world as we know it" featuring in the song.

The band were nominated for an Ivor Novello Award in 1998 for best contemporary song for Smile along with the Verve's "The Drugs Don't Work" and Radiohead's "No Surprises". The band won a Tartan Clef award in 1997 as the best new Scottish band.

Songs are often related to other songs on the same album by a common theme. The album It Doesn't Matter Anymore received good reviews (8/10 NME and 4/5 Q) as did the follow-up A Tune a Day (7/10 NME and 4/5 Q).

The creative output saw around 100 songs written in five years. They played at music festivals in the UK, and around Europe, They were also a staple on compilation albums such as Shine, and played radio sessions for BBC Radio 1, Radio 2, Virgin and others. Television appearances included Top of the Pops, TFI Friday, The Jack Docherty Show, Fully Booked and The Big Breakfast, with keyboardist Ken McAlpine appearing as a contestant on Never Mind the Buzzcocks (for Phill Jupitus' team). The band performed at each T in the Park festival between 1995 and 1998.

"The Day Before Yesterday's Man" was used in the TV series Teachers, Hollyoaks and the film Shooting Fish.

Smile was the theme tune for bank Smile.co.uk's TV advertisements, Arnold Clark Automobiles, Sky Movies UK, Pearl Drops, and mayonnaise in Japan, and was re-recorded for use as the main theme of the Nine Network idents in Australia 2008, and was also parodied in Peter Kay's Phoenix Nights. The song was also used on As If, Holiday Showdown, Wife Swap, That'll Teach 'Em, Grumpy Old Men, X Factor, Clarkson's Car Years, and in 2005 was included in VH2's list of the best indie songs of all time. The song was also used as the theme music for the television review show Manic Episodes.

I Wasn't Built to Get Up was used in an advertising campaign for Direct Debits on UK television in 1999. The song "Monday Mornings" was used in the film Fast Food in 1998. "Life is a Motorway" has been used in the BBC TV show Homes Under the Hammer.

Rod Stewart recorded the band's song "Dylan's Day Off" for his album The Rod Stewart Sessions 1971–1998.

== Post break-up: 2005–present ==
The Supernaturals took a break after their third album's release in 2002. At their peak, they enjoyed a loyal fanbase, with several high-quality fansites.

Songwriter McColl went on to be guitarist in band the Hussys. In 2007 the band released We Expected, an eight track album on Quince Records in Japan. The band's 2008 album Super Pro was recorded by Kevin Burleigh at the Byre Studio in Beauly. This was augmented by four songs and released as Super Pro + by Quince Records in Japan in 2009. The band's 2009 UK album Japanese Graffiti had a more 1980s sound. The band then recorded Tokyo Elephant Brothers in a camper van in 2010. The band's final album to date is Please Secure Your Valuables, which was released in 2011. The band have played sessions on Rapal, Channel M and the Janice Long radio show.

Their songs "Rock Concert", "Napoleon", "Friends Reunited", "Warm and Fuzzy" and "We Expected" have been used variously on Jersey Shore, When I Was 17, Paris Hilton's BFF and Made on MTV. "Rock Concert" was used in a US national advert for Payless Shoes. Their songs "Aftershave" "Roller Disco" "T Rex Records" and "Jenny Teaches Rock School" have been played by Rodney Bingenheimer. The Hills have also featured their song "Rocksteady" and "We Expected". The song "Roller Disco" was a top 10 airplay single in Peru in 2009 together with "Greatest Living Actress" and "Aftershave" which received extensive airplay in South America. "Tiger" was used in the Russian language film "20 Cigarettes". The song "Just Think of my Heart as a Campervan" has been used on the BBC 1 TV show, The Legalizer.

Keyboardist McAlpine later became a cameraman for Eòrpa, House Guest, Dragons' Den, and music videos for Justin Currie.

Drummer Tilston collaborated with William Orbit on his 2009 album My Oracle Lives Uptown, and with Madonna on her 2012 album MDNA.

In February 2012, the Supernaturals began rehearsing again with their four original members. Over the next two years they wrote and recorded a fourth album 360, at Gorbals Sound Studios in Glasgow. The album was released on 6 April 2015.

The band released their fifth album, Bird of Luck, on 1 August 2019.

Archive footage from one of the band's appearances on Channel 4's TFI Friday appears in the documentary feature film, 'The Closer We Get' (2016) directed by Karen Guthrie, sister of bass player Mark Guthrie.

The band returned to playing live in 2015 and have since performed supporting Sleeper, Embrace and performed at the Loopallu Festival, the Belladrum Festival, Mugstock Festival and as part of the Star Shaped Festival tour at venues including the Brixton Academy.

Guitarist Derek McManus died on 27 June 2022, at the age of 55.

== Discography ==
=== Albums ===
- It Doesn't Matter Anymore, May 1997 – Number 9 UK
- A Tune a Day, August 1998 – Number 21 UK
- What We Did Last Summer, June 2002
- 360, April 2015
- Bird of Luck, August 2019
- It Only Gets Worse, July 2023
- Show Tunes, May 2025

=== Cassette mini albums on Tourette Sounds ===
- Big Seven 1993 (seven tracks)
- Dark Star 1993 (eight tracks)

=== CD EPs on Tourette Sounds ===
- Sitting in the Sun 1994 (seven tracks)
- Let it Bleat 1995 (five tracks)

=== Singles ===
Year	Single	UK Singles Chart peak	Scottish Singles Chart peak	Album	Video director
1996	"Smile"	98	48	It Doesn't Matter Anymore	n/a
1996	"Lazy Lover"	34	13	It Doesn't Matter Anymore	n/a
1997	"The Day Before Yesterday's Man"	25	10	It Doesn't Matter Anymore	Hammer & Tongs
1997	"Smile"	23	12	It Doesn't Matter Anymore	Hammer & Tongs
1997	"Love Has Passed Away"	38	23	It Doesn't Matter Anymore	Barry Maguire
1997	"Prepare to Land"	48	32	It Doesn't Matter Anymore	Barry Maguire
1998	"I Wasn't Built to Get Up"	25	8	A Tune a Day	Rupert Jones
1998	"Sheffield Song"	45	17	A Tune a Day	Dave Osborne
1999	"Everest"	52	21	A Tune a Day	Barnaby & Scott
2001	"Finishing Credits"	117	90	What We Did Last Summer	n/a
2002	"What We Did Last Summer"	116	92	What We Did Last Summer	Craig Martin
2002	"Life Is a Motorway"	–	–	What We Did Last Summer	Craig Martin
2020	"You're My Best Friend"			Warner Archives	n/a
2022	"I Want You Back For Xmas"			Non album single	n/a
2023	"Roy Wouldn't"			Show Tunes	n/a
2023	"Burn The Witch"			Show Tunes	n/a
2025	"Don't Let The Past Catch Up With You"			Show Tunes	n/a

== Television appearances ==
Date	Programme
14 October 1996	The Big Breakfast
16 October 1996	Fresh Pop
29 January 1997	The Big Breakfast
31 January 1997	TFI Friday
8 February 1997	Top of the Pops
4 July 1997	The Big Breakfast
2 July 1997	Top of the Pops
31 October 1997	TFI Friday
19 July 1998	Fully Booked
9 October 1998	TFI Friday
15 October 1998	STV Box Set
12 November 1998	The Jack Docherty Show
5 March 1999	Ozone
