= Kid Galahad (disambiguation) =

Kid Galahad is a 1962 American musical film starring Elvis Presley as a boxer.

Kid Galahad may also refer to:

- Kid Galahad (EP), an EP by Elvis Presley, containing songs from the above-mentioned film
- Kid Galahad (1937 film), featuring Edward G. Robinson, Bette Davis, and Humphrey Bogart
- Kid Galahad, former name of British band The Furze
- Kid Galahad, nickname of Abdul Barry Awad (born 1990), British boxer
