= Furze (disambiguation) =

Furze is a common name for Ulex, a genus of about 20 species of evergreen shrubs in the subfamily Faboideae of the pea family Fabaceae.

Furze may also refer to:

- Colin Furze (1979-), plumber, stuntman, filmmaker, inventor and two-time Guinness World Record holder
- Mark Furze (born 1986), Australian actor
- The Furze, a British indie band

== See also ==
- Furs
