= Where's My Gold? EP =

Where's my Gold EP

EP by Kid Galahad
- Released: 6 June 2001
- Genre: Indie
- Length: 20:35
- Label: Ignition
- Producer: Jim Abbiss/Kid Galahad

Kid Galahad chronology
Stealin' Beats EP (2001)	Where's my Gold EP (2001)	Runaway Train EP (2001)

Where's my Gold? EP is the second release from British band Kid Galahad. Two tracks on this release, "Where's my Gold?" and "I Don't Wanna Play", were recorded in the studio and produced by Jim Abbiss who had previously worked with artists such as UNKLE and DJ Shadow. Whilst "Green Painted Lady" and "Consoul" were both demo recordings, produced by the band before signing to Ignition Records.

The EP was generally well received and was selected as the Single of the Week by MTV. "I Don't Wanna Play" was featured in the UK Channel 4 comedy drama Teachers.

== Track listing ==
All tracks written by A.Bull, D.Ody, P.Seaman, D.Strows

1. "Where's my Gold?" – 3:59
2. "Green Painted Lady" – 3:24
3. "Consoul" – 4:53
4. "I Don't Wanna Play" – 8:23

== Personnel ==
- Ash Bull – vocals
- Dave Ody – Guitar
- Paul Seaman – Bass guitar
- D. "Wookie" Strows – drums
- Jim Abbiss – Production and Mixing (Tracks 1 and 4)
- Kid Galahad – Production and Mixing (Tracks 2 and 3)
