= T in the Park 2008 =

Music festival in Scotland

- Genre: Various
- Dates: 10 – 13 July 2008
- Locations: Balado, Perth and Kinross, Scotland
- Website: http://www.tinthepark.com

T in the Park 2008 was the fifteenth T in the Park festival to take place since 1994. It took place on the weekend of Friday 11 July, Saturday 12 July and Sunday 13 July at Balado, in Perth and Kinross, Scotland. The bands headlining the 2008 event were Rage Against the Machine, The Verve and R.E.M. on the Main Stage and The Chemical Brothers, Kaiser Chiefs and The Prodigy on the Radio 1 / NME Stage.

It was announced that the campsite would open on 10 July 2008 to avoid a repeat of the previous year's traffic problems.

The first batch of "early bird" tickets (approximately 40,000) were released at 9 am on the 10 July 2007, selling out in less than 65 minutes with the line up yet to be announced. The next batch of tickets went on sale on 16 February 2008 at 9 am. Although tickets sold out in just over an hour.

== Incidents ==
The 2008 festival was marred by two incidents which occurred over the weekend, including the first death at T in the Park. One man was found dead in his tent, another man was stabbed 11 times by two tea boys after he intervened to stop them harassing a female friend of his. Fortunately, this incident did not result in a fatality. The organisers have been heavily criticized for the security not stopping the man who smuggled the knife into the festival. There were only 68 arrests at T in 2008, one up from the previous year.

== Awards ==
T in the park won a number of awards for the festival hold in 2008

- Vodafone's Live C4 Festival of the Year
- Best Line Up at the UK Festival Awards by fans * Awarded Scotland's only Green ‘n’ Clean Award by Yourope, Europe's Festival Association in association with Julie's Bicycle
- Awarded three Scottish Event Awards for Best Large Festival, Green Award and overall Event Grand Prix winner

The Festival's green credentials were recognised in 2008 with the award of the Greener Festival Award 2008 from http://agreenerfestival.com who noted that the festival has long been carbon neutral, promoted public transport and had excellent policies to protect the local environment and waterways.

== Line ups ==
The 2008 line-up was as follows:

=== Main Stage ===
Friday 11 July	Saturday 12 July	Sunday 13 July
The Verve; Stereophonics; KT Tunstall; Newton Faulkner	Rage Against the Machine; The Fratellis; The Kooks; Biffy Clyro; The Feeling; Kate Nash; Gun; Eddy Grant; Sharleen Spiteri	R.E.M.; Kings of Leon; Amy Winehouse; Counting Crows; The Enemy; Amy Macdonald; Shed Seven; Bowling for Soup

- The Sugababes were on the line up for the main stage on the Saturday however pulled out for unknown reasons.

=== Radio 1 / NME Stage ===
Friday 11 July	Saturday 12 July	Sunday 13 July
The Chemical Brothers; Feeder; Scouting for Girls; The Wombats	Kaiser Chiefs; The Raconteurs; The Pigeon Detectives; We Are Scientists; The Courteeners; The Subways; dEUS; The Rocket Summer; The Blackout	The Prodigy; The Zutons; Panic! at the Disco; Goo Goo Dolls; The Hoosiers; Powderfinger; One Night Only; Little Man Tate; Mindless Self Indulgence

=== King Tut's Tent ===
Friday 11 July	Saturday 12 July	Sunday 13 July
The Futureheads; The Music; Kids in Glass Houses; Alphabeat; Los Campesinos!	Ian Brown; The Pogues; Reverend & The Makers; Jack Peñate; Sons and Daughters; Alabama 3; The Stranglers; David Jordan; In Case of Fire; Jaguar Love	Primal Scream; The Charlatans; Pendulum; Echo & the Bunnymen; Vampire Weekend; British Sea Power; The Ting Tings; Delays; Get Cape. Wear Cape. Fly; Royworld

=== Slam Tent ===
Friday 11 July	Saturday 12 July	Sunday 13 July
N/A	Jeff Mills; Modeselektor; Erol Alkan; Model 500; Carl Craig; Dusty Kid; Dubfire; The Black Dog; Damian Lazarus	Richie Hawtin; Aphex Twin; Justice; DJ Hell; Miss Kittin & The Hacker; Slam; Michael Mayer; Rob Da Bank

=== Pet Sounds Arena ===
Friday 11 July	Saturday 12 July	Sunday 13 July
N/A	Interpol; Ben Folds; Band of Horses; MGMT; The Hold Steady; Lightspeed Champion; Will Young; Tom Baxter; The Whigs; Arno Carstens	Eddie and the Robbers (listed on programme as TBC); Hot Chip; The National; Seasick Steve; Paul Heaton; Battles; My Morning Jacket; Brian Jonestown Massacre; 1990s

=== Futures Stage ===
Friday 11 July	Saturday 12 July	Sunday 13 July
N/A	Air Traffic; Cajun Dance Party; The Rascals; The Law; Glasvegas; The Script; White Lies; The Metros; Gabriella Cilmi; Bryn Christopher; Twisted Wheel; Fight Like Apes	Elliot Minor; Captain; Black Kids; Sergeant; We Are The Physics; Ida Maria; Yeasayer; Beth Rowley; Jack McManus; Sons of Albion; Gary Go; The Haze

=== Relentless Stage ===
Friday 11 July	Saturday 12 July	Sunday 13 July
Blood Red Shoes; Joe Lean and the Jing Jang Jong; Bombay Bicycle Club; The Displacements; Haunts	Cancer Bats; Fucked Up; The Blackout; The Ghost of a Thousand; Fighting with Wire; Devil Sold His Soul; Skirtbox; Shels	The Presets; Holy Fuck; Metronomy; Johnny Foreigner; Sparkadia; The Rushes; The Xcerts

=== T-break Stage ===
Friday 11 July	Saturday 12 July	Sunday 13 July
State Of Affairs; No Kilter; Figure 5; Luva Anna; The Down And Outs; Joe Acheson Quartet; The New York Fund	The Fire And I; Isosceles; The King Hats; The Twilight Sad; Parka; Twin Atlantic; The Hazey Janes; Running With Horses; Haight-Ashbury; Be A Familiar; Alto Elite; Grace Emilys	Zoey Van Goey; Jocasta Sleeps; Ex Wives; Frightened Rabbit; Edgar Prais; The Vivians; Fangs; Velcro Quartet; Come On Gang; We See Lights; Departures; Concerto For Constantine; Hi-5 Alive

The Relentless Stage, new to the 2008 version of the festival, was named after and sponsored by Relentless energy drink.
