= It Don't Matter (disambiguation) =

"It Don't Matter" is a 2021 single by Alok, Sofi Tukker, and Inna

It Don't Matter may also refer to:

- "It Don't Matter", a song by Def Leppard from their 1980 album On Through the Night
- "It Don't Matter", a song by Donavon Frankenreiter from his 2004 album Donavon Frankenreiter
- "It Don't Matter", a song by Gang of Four from their 1983 album Hard
- "It Don't Matter", a song by Jacob Collier from his 2019 album Djesse Vol. 2
- "It Don't Matter", a song by Loverboy from their 1980 album Loverboy
- "It Don't Matter", by Moka Only from his 2011 album Airport 5
- "It Don't Matter", a song by Rehab from their 2000 album Southern Discomfort

== See also ==
- It Doesn't Matter (disambiguation)
- Don't Matter, a song by Akon
