= Shooting Fish =

- Promotional poster
- Directed by: Stefan Schwartz
- Written by: Richard Holmes; Stefan Schwartz
- Produced by: Richard Holmes; Glynis Murray
- Starring: Dan Futterman; Stuart Townsend; Kate Beckinsale; Nickolas Grace; Claire Cox; Ralph Ineson; Dominic Mafham; Peter Capaldi; Annette Crosbie; Jane Lapotaire; Phyllis Logan
- Cinematography: Henry Braham
- Edited by: Alan Strachan
- Music by: Stanislas Syrewicz
- Production companies: Gruber Bros; National Lottery; Tomboy Films; UK Arts Council; Winchester Films
- Distributed by: Entertainment Film Distributors
- Release dates: 22 August 1997 (Norway); 17 October 1997 (United Kingdom)
- Running time: 112 minutes
- Country: United Kingdom
- Language: English
- Budget: £2.135 million
- Box office: £4 million

Shooting Fish is a 1997 British romantic crime comedy film directed by Stefan Schwartz and co-written with Richard Holmes, starring Dan Futterman and Stuart Townsend as two con men with Kate Beckinsale as their unwilling assistant. The film was produced by Winchester Films and partly funded by National Lottery money administered through the UK Arts Council. Shooting Fish aimed to transfer well to international markets that were keen on British films following the success of Four Weddings and a Funeral.

The film was released in the United Kingdom on 17 October 1997 and in the United States on 1 May 1998.

== Plot ==
Dylan (Dan Futterman) and Jez (Stuart Townsend) are two orphans who meet in their twenties and vow to achieve their shared childhood dream of living in a stately home. In pursuit of this dream, they spend their days living in a disused gas holder, spending as little money as possible and conning the upper classes out of their riches. During one of their cons, they encounter Georgie (Kate Beckinsale) who is a medical student who can type.

Georgie becomes aware that the two are con-artists. But they manage to convince her that they are modern day Robin Hoods, taking from the rich and giving to the poor. When a con goes wrong, the two find themselves jailed. They later learn that their entire fortune is to be rendered useless as the Royal Bank of England is recalling the notes. Jez and Dylan decide they need to somehow escape and retrieve their money or risk losing it. Jez contacts Georgie and appeals to her to help.

Georgie, unbeknownst to the guys, needs money to save the Down syndrome foundation's mansion that her brother currently attends. She organises for Jez and Dylan to get released on compassionate leave under the guise of attending the cremation of a relative. While the ceremony is ongoing, they sneak out and retrieve the money and return before the prison warders suspect a thing. With the money hidden in the coffin they accidentally send it to be cremated and are returned to prison completely despondent.

It turns out to be a double con as Georgie retrieves the money and buys her ex's "champion" horse only to learn that the horse is a dud. When the guys get out she comes clean and they hatch another plan which will see the horse win a big race allowing them to charge stud fees. Everything works out and the horse romps to victory (thanks to inserting helium in the jockeys outfit).

Georgie agrees to sell the now champion horse back to her ex. With the proceeds all three agree to save the foundation and as they drive to the foundation broke, Jez and Dylan realise they have finally found their stately home.

== Cast ==
- Dan Futterman as Dylan
  - Jacob Macoby as 8-year-old Dylan
- Stuart Townsend as Jez
  - Myles Anderson as 8-year-old Jez
- Kate Beckinsale as Georgie
- Dominic Mafham as Roger
- Tom Chadbon as Mr. Greenaway
- Phyllis Logan as Mrs. Ross
- Peter Capaldi as Mr. Gilzean
- Geoffrey Whitehead as Horse owner
- Ralph Ineson as Mr. Ray
- Nicola Duffett as Mrs. Ray
- Annette Crosbie as Mrs. Cummins
- Nicholas Woodeson as Mr. Collyns
- Jane Lapotaire as Dylan's headmistress
- Rowena Cooper as Jez's teacher
- John Clegg as Vicar

== Production ==
The film was shot in the autumn of 1996 (August–October). Most filming took place at Shepperton Studios and outside street locations in north London. Alexandra Palace features in one notable scene. The gas holder in which Dylan and Jez live no longer exists, having been situated in Mill Hill East up to the early 2000s. The crematorium scene was filmed in Garston, west Hertfordshire. The film would eventually make its nationwide screening in October 1997.

== Reception ==
The film opened in Norway on 22 August 1997 and grossed $65,030 for the week from 10 screens to place 14th at the Nordic box office. It held its own commercially in the UK on its release on 17 October 1997. It opened in third place at the UK box office with an opening weekend gross of £806,605 from 205 screens, the third biggest opening for a British film for the year after Bean and The Full Monty. It opened the same weekend in Germany where it finished 12th at the German box office with an opening weekend gross of $224,382 over the 4-day holiday weekend. Reviews at the time singled out Townsend for praise but felt the narrative contained one twist and turn too many. Others suggested the film was merely an 'Ealing Comedy' in modern form and lacked modern characterization. The 'soft comedic focus' however had been a deliberate plan by the production team who wanted to avoid the socio-political realism in comedies like Brassed Off and The Full Monty.

A Time Out review (1997) said, "A succession of cameos provides light relief, and the film's saved by the amiable performances of Futterman, Beckinsale and, especially, Townsend."

On the review aggregator website Rotten Tomatoes, 52% of 33 critics' reviews are positive.

== Accolades ==
Beckinsale was awarded Best Actress for her performance in Shooting Fish at the Sitges - Catalan International Film Festival.

== Soundtrack ==
Stefan Schwartz, the director, was looking for an essential nineties feel to the film. The era of Britpop was at its height and this was reflected in a stylish and striking array of tracks for a light comedy film:

1. "Me and You vs the World" - Space
2. "Beautiful Alone" - Strangelove
3. "Day Before Yesterday's Man" - The Supernaturals
4. "Golden Skin" - Silver Sun
5. "Twist" - Symposium
6. "Neighbourhood" - Space
7. "What the World Needs Now Is Love" - Jackie DeShannon
8. "I'm a Better Man (For Having Loved You)" - David McAlmont
9. "Body Medusa (The Leftfield Re-mix)" Supereal
10. "Friends" - The Wannadies
11. "Bluetonic" - The Bluetones
12. "Do You Know the Way to San Jose?" - Dionne Warwick
13. "In Charge" - Dubstar
14. "To Be the One" - Passion Star
15. "In Pursuit of Happiness" - The Divine Comedy
16. "Shooting Fish" - Stanisław Syrewicz

== Home media ==
The original 112-minute version of Shooting Fish was released on VHS in the UK in 1998, running to 107 minutes due to PAL speed-up. When released on DVD (and re-released on VHS) in 2001, however, it ran to 99 minutes, equivalent to 103 minutes theatrically. This is apparently the US cinema version, having removed some scenes and dialogue aimed more specifically at British audiences (such as some references to Margaret Thatcher). As of September 2014 it has not been re-released uncut, or in the Blu-ray format.
