= Gold Dust Noise =

Studio album by Kid Galahad
- Released: 20 May 2002
- Genre: Indie
- Length: 45:32
- Label: Ignition
- Producer: Jim Abbiss

Kid Galahad chronology
Runaway Train (2001)	Gold Dust Noise (2002)	The Bedroom Tapes (2006)

Gold Dust Noise is the first studio album by the rock band Kid Galahad. It was released in 2002 on Ignition Records. The album was produced by Jim Abbiss.

Mark Beaumont of NME rated the album 3.5 out of 5 stars.

== Track listing ==
All tracks written by Bull, Ody, Seaman and Strows

1. "Where's My Gold?" – 4:09
2. "Stealin' Beats" – 4:00
3. "Skedaddle" – 4:13
4. "Swimming to Shore" – 4:30
5. "Salvation" – 4:53
6. "Runaway Train" – 3:36
7. "Pack It In" – 3:14
8. "World Crashes Down" – 5:13
9. "Distant Sunshine" – 3:25
10. "I Don't Wanna Play" – 8:21

== Personnel ==
- Ash Bull – vocals
- Dave Ody – guitar
- Paul Seaman – bass guitar
- D. "Wookie" Strows – drums
- Jim Abbiss – production and mixing
