= Star Tiger Star Ariel =

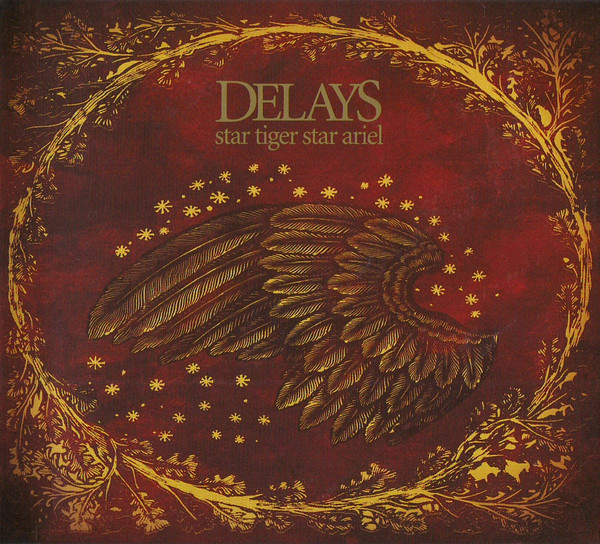

Studio album by Delays
- Released: 21 June 2010
- Recorded: September 2009
- Studio: Rockfield, Monmouth; NAM, Holt
- Length: 46:54
- Label: Lookout Mountain
- Producer: Duncan Lewis; Tom Dalgety; Delays

Delays chronology
Everything's the Rush (2008)	Star Tiger Star Ariel (2010)

Singles from Star Tiger Star Ariel
- 1. "Unsung" Released: 13 June 2010

Star Tiger Star Ariel is the fourth studio album by English rock band Delays. The album was released on 21 June 2010 through Lookout Mountain Records. Less than a year after the release of their third studio album Everything's the Rush, the band left Fiction Records in early 2009. Around this time, they were demoing material for its follow-up. In September 2009, they recorded at Rockfield Studios in Monmouth, Wales and NAM Studios in Holt, with Duncan Lewis, Tom Dalgety and the band acting as producers.

Star Tiger Star Ariel received mixed reviews from critics, some commenting on the band's experimentation, others thought it was uninspiring. It features a stripped-down sound, compared to the band's previous albums. Preceding the album's release, the band went on a tour of the United Kingdom. "Unsung" was released as the album's lead single in June 2010; later in the year, they went on another UK tour.

== Background ==
Delays released their third studio album Everything's the Rush in May 2008 through Fiction and Polydor Records. The album, which peaked at number 26 on the UK Albums Chart, was promoted with a tour and various festivals around the UK. In February 2009, the band announced left Fiction Records; they also said they were in the process of demoing material for their next album. "Rhapsody" and "Unsung" were made available on their Myspace profile.

Star Tiger Star Ariel was recorded in September 2009 at Rockfield Studios in Monmouth, Wales, while additional vocals for "Star Tiger, Star Ariel" were recorded at NAM Studios in Holt. Duncan Lewis, Tom Dalgety and the band produced the proceedings; Aaron Gilbert did additional production at Cellar Door. Dalgety handled record, as well as mixing with the band, bar "Unsung", at Evansson Audio Media in Bath. "Unsung" was mixed by Steve Power at T.O.P. Studio in London. Kevin Metcalfe mastered the album at Soundmasters in London.

== Composition ==
In the context of their other albums, Greg Gilbert said Star Tiger Star Ariel "sounds like roots beneath the city shaking the buildings at night. This record is about being lost, and the dream of being found". He said they intentionally wanted a stripped-down sound to counter the orchestra arrangements heard on Everything's the Rush. The members felt inspired by driving around the New Forest national park. The album opens with the Middle Eastern-inspired ambient song "Find a Home (New Forest Shaker)", which is followed by the indie pop "The Lost Estate". The Britpop aping of "May '45" is followed by "Hold Fire", which is a minimalist piano-centric ballad. "In Brilliant Sunshine" stars Aaron Gilbert on lead vocals, and evokes the sound of New Order. "Moment Gone" and "Lakes Can Be Lethal" harken back to the band's earlier sound; the album concludes with the progressive rock number "Star Tiger, Star Ariel".

== Release and reception ==
Professional ratings
Aggregate scores
Source	Rating
AnyDecentMusic?	5.7/10
Review scores
Source	Rating
AllMusic	3/5 stars
Drowned in Sound	5/10
musicOMH	4/5 stars
NME	5/10
Pitchfork	5.7/10
PopMatters	6/10

=== Promotion ===
In October 2009, Delays went on a tour of the UK, where they debuted material from their forthcoming album. On 21 April 2010, Star Tiger Star Ariel was announced for release in two months' time. Alongside this, the album's track listing was posted online, and "Find a Home (New Forest Shaker)" was made available as a free download from the band's website. In May and June 2010, they embarked on a second trek of the UK. "Unsung" was released as the album's lead single on 13 June 2010. They went on another tour of the UK in October 2010.

=== Critical reception ===
Star Tiger Star Ariel was met with mixed reviews from music critics. At AnyDecentMusic?, which assigns a normalized rating out of 10 to reviews from mainstream publications, the album received an average score of 5.7, based on ninereviews.

AllMusic reviewer Jon O'Brien saw it as a "much more urgent, rock-led affair than its predecessors", though "still offers glimpses of their previous distinctive style". musicOMH's Ben Hogwood said a number of the songs had "moments of pure beauty", with the band "delighting in exploring new sounds to go with Gilbert’s distinctive tones". Maria Schurr of PopMatters wrote that there were "signs of definite progression from their lovely if innocuous debut, Faded Seaside Glamour", and if they could improve on their lyrics, "then they may have something worth swooning over". Pitchfork contributor Ian Cohen noted that the band attempts to "reintroduc[e] themselves with every album", and with Star Tiger Star Ariel, the "strain to come on as strong as possible shows more than ever". He added that it felt "over-baked and impersonal" compared to their earlier releases.

Drowned in Sound writer Simon Jay Catling said the album was "another disappointing reaffirmation that beyond their debut the group still haven’t really written a full record that stands up to sustained interest". Tom Edwards of NME echoed a similar sentiment, stating that "between the Killers-lite electro fluff and shoegaze flutterings lie a couple of pretty snazzy pop songs glimmering timidly in the murk". Daily Express reviewer Martin Townsend felt for the majority of the album, the band "huff and puff like a glorified pub group".

== Track listing ==
All songs written by Greg and Aaron Gilbert, except "Shanghaied", "Hold Fire" and "Lakes Can Be Lethal" by G. Gilbert.

1. "Find a Home (New Forest Shaker)" – 4:02
2. "The Lost Estate" – 4:05
3. "Shanghaied" – 2:59
4. "Rhapsody" – 4:00
5. "May '45" – 3:17
6. "Hold Fire" – 5:07
7. "Unsung" – 3:59
8. "In Brilliant Sunshine" – 4:42
9. "Moment Gone" – 4:27
10. "Lakes Can Be Lethal" – 5:12
11. "Star Tiger, Star Ariel" – 5:04

== Personnel ==
Personnel per booklet.

Delays

- Greg Gilbert – lead vocals, guitars, piano (track 6)
- Aaron Gilbert – lead vocal (track 8), backing vocals, keyboards, programming
- Colin Fox – bass, backing vocals
- Rowly – drums, percussion

Production and design

- Duncan Lewis – producer
- Tom Dalgety – producer, recording, mixing (all except track 7)
- Delays – producer, mixing (all except track 7)
- Aaron Gilbert – additional production
- Steve Power – mixing (track 7)
- Gary Kelly – design
- Steve Averill – design
- Kevin Metcalfe – mastering
