= It Doesn't Matter =

It Doesn't Matter may refer to:

- It Doesn't Matter (album), by The Underdog Project, 2000
- "It Doesn't Matter" (song), a 2000 song by Wyclef Jean
- "It Doesn't Matter", a song by The Chemical Brothers from Dig Your Own Hole
- "It Doesn't Matter", a song by The Living Tombstone
- "It Doesn't Matter", a song by Depeche Mode from Some Great Reward
- "It Doesn't Matter", a version of the Manassas song performed by Firefall from Firefall
- "It Doesn't Matter", a song by Five Finger Death Punch from And Justice for None
- "It Doesn't Matter", a song by Tony Harnell from Sonic Adventure and its sequel
- "It Doesn't Matter", a song by Alison Krauss from So Long So Wrong
- "It Doesn't Matter", a song by Manassas from Manassas
- "It Doesn't Matter", a song by Ratt from Dancing Undercover
- "It Doesn't Matter", a song by September from In Orbit
- "It Doesn't Matter", a song by Spyro Gyra from Morning Dance

== See also ==
- It Don't Matter (disambiguation)
- "It Doesn't Matter Anymore", a song by Paul Anka
- It Doesn't Matter Anymore (album), an album by The Supernaturals
- Doesn't Matter Anyway (EP), an EP by Savatage
- "Doesn't Really Matter", a song by Janet Jackson
- "It Doesn't Really Matter", a song by Platinum Blonde from Standing in the Dark
- "It Doesn't Matter Two", a song by Depeche Mode from Black Celebration
