= Winchester Films =

British production company

- Industry: Film
- Founded: March 1993; 33 years ago
- Founder: Gary Smith
- Defunct: March 2004; 22 years ago
- Fate: Acquired and absorbed by ContentFilm and Universal Pictures UK
- Headquarters: United Kingdom
- Divisions: Winchester Film Distribution; Winchester Television

Winchester Films was a British production company. It was started in March 1993 and was listed on the Alternative Investment Market to raise the capital needed to build an effective portfolio of films and TV programmes. In the late 1990s and the early part of the 21st Century, Winchester Films acquired produced many British films and acquired distribution rights to films from other countries. It also expanded into the US, setting up an office in Los Angeles in order to make connections with the Hollywood crowd. This led to Winchester Films being granted distribution rights to Heartbreakers (the UK's largest distribution deal - $53 million).

In May 2000, Winchester Films had announced that they're launching their own film distribution division based in Britiain named Winchester Film Distribution with Winchester hiring former FilmFour International distribution chief Mick Southworth heading the new distribution division as their CEO.

In May 2001, Winchester Films announced that they've signed a three-year overall deal with Los Angeles-based American production company The Donners' Company to develop and produce their films.

In June 2003, Winchester Entertainment announced that they've acquired London and Los Angeles-based British/American international distribution sales and financing company Cobalt Pictures from their founders John Muse and Alton Irby expanding Winchester Entertainment's film business with them added the latter's portfolio to that of Winchester's with Cobalt Pictures becoming a film financing label and being renamed Cobalt Media Group with Cobalt's British principle Rodney Payne, joining the board of Winchester Entertainment and will continue to operate the label. In March 2004, the company was taken over by ContentFilms Inc and the name was officially changed from Winchester Films to ContentFilm. ContentFilm is no longer listed on the AIM market in London.

== Winchester Films produced ==
- Tales Not Told (2005)
- The Crocodile Hunter: Collision Course (2002)
- One Night (2002)
- Last Orders (2001)
- Another Life (2001)
- Wild About Harry (2000)
- Greenfingers (2000)
- Throw Down (2000)
- Lighthouse (2000)
- Captain Jack (1999)
- The Sea Change (1998)
- Shooting Fish (1997)
- Clockwork Mice (1995)
- Bounty Hamster (2002, 2003)
- The Wheels on the Bus (2001, 2002, 2004, 2006, 2009, 2011)
- Snobarna (2000)
- The Big Garage (1995)
- Jellabies, Jellkins and Jellies (1999, 2001, 2003)
- Shirley Holmes (1997)
- ST Bear's Doll Hospital (1998, 2003)

== Distributed films ==
- Shade (2003)
- Slap Her... She's French (2002)
- Heartbreakers (2001)
- Soul Assassin (2001)
- Greenfingers (2000)
- Honest (2000)
- Palmer's Pick Up (1999)
- Vol-au-vent (1996)
