= The Dandys =

British indie-pop group

The Dandys were a British indie-pop act that formed in 1996, releasing their only album, Symphonic Screams, on 15 June 1998. The album featured the singles "I Wanna Be Like You", "Dirty Weekend", "You Make Me Want To Scream" and "English Country Garden".

Although from Leeds, Yorkshire, England, the band is more associated with the York music scene. The band members were Andy Firth lead vocals, Mike Brooke keyboards plus backing vocals, Ben Davies guitar, Tony Beasley bass guitar and Bryan Munslow drums.

Their songs "I Wanna Be Like You" and "All That You Do" were featured in the first series of British comedy/drama television program Teachers. They performed the song "English Country Garden" on BBC Television Sunday morning television programme Fully Booked.

Later incarnations of the band, all featuring singer Andy Firth, include Soulshaker, Sonar, The Shanks, The Clients and most recently Deltawave.

They were associated with the Britpop era.

== Discography ==
=== Singles ===
- "I Wanna Be Like You" 19/5/97 (ATF1) Ltd purple 7" backed with "Stormy Weather", CD extra track "Real". No.150 (UK)
- "Dirty Weekend" 4/8/97 (ATF2) Ltd clear 7" backed with "Elephant Man", CD extra track "Glory Glory". No.76 (UK)
- "You Make Me Want To Scream" 2/3/98 (ATF3) Ltd blue 7" backed with "Til There Was You" / CD1 "You Make Me Want To Scream", "Til There Was You" and "Wintery Gate" CD2 "You Make Me Want To Scream", "Sunshine Superstar" and "Pop Tart". UK No. 71
- "English Country Garden" 18/5/98 (ATF4) 7" "English Country Garden" backed with "Man Eater", CD1 "English Country Garden", "Man Eater" and "Real" (Live version), CD2 "English Country Garden", "Braindead" and "Oh Yuko". UK No. 57

=== Albums ===
- Symphonic Screams – "Intro", "Merry Go Round", "Drag Queen", "You Make Me Want To Scream", "English Country Garden", "Dirty Weekend", "All That You Do", "I Wanna Be Like You", "Walter Ego", "Long Live The King", "The Butterfly Song" and "Johnny Foxtrot".

=== Compilations ===
- "Do What You Want" on The Beautiful North compilation album
