= It Doesn't Matter Anymore (album) =

Studio album by The Supernaturals
- Released: 5 May 1997
- Studio: Jacobs; Eden; Trident; Chapel; Chipping Norton; Riverside
- Genre: Indie rock, Britpop
- Length: 45:36
- Label: Parlophone/Food Records
- Producer: Pete Smith

The Supernaturals chronology
Let It Bleat EP (1995)	It Doesn't Matter Anymore (1997)	A Tune a Day (1998)

It Doesn't Matter Anymore is the debut album by Scottish band The Supernaturals on the Parlophone label. It reached number 9 on the UK Albums Chart in 1997, and spawned four top 40 singles on the UK Singles Chart.

== Production ==
It Doesn't Matter Anymore was recorded at several studios: Jacobs, Eden, Trident, Chapel, Chipping Norton, and Riverside. Pete Smith served as producer on every track, except for "Pie in the Sky", which was produced by the band. Many of the songs were engineered by different people: Jim Brumby ("Please Be Gentle with Me" and "Prepare to Land"), Ben Darlow ("Smile", "Glimpse of the Light", "Lazy Lover", "Dung Beetle", "I Don't Think So", and "Trees"), Barry Hammond ("Love Has Passed Away", "The Day Before Yesterday's Man", and "Trees"), Jason Clift ("Stammer"), and Duncan Cameron ("Pie in the Sky"). Smith mixed most of the songs with Darlow as the mix engineer at Nomis, except "Lazy Lover" and "Dung Beetle", which were mixed at Swanyard. The band mixed "Pie in the Sky" with Cameron as the mix engineer at Riverside.

== Music and lyrics ==
"Please Be Gentle With Me" had previously been released on Let It Bleat in a different arrangement, with less pronounced bass, and growling dog sound effects.

Early jam versions of "Dung Beetle" and "The Day Before Yesterday's Man" had previously been released on Dark Star, in a more improvised style.

The song "Stammer" had previously been known in 1993 as "Her Majesty".

"Pie in the Sky" features a trumpet solo by Robert Henderson of A Band Called Quinn and The Bathers.

The title song of the album was not included on the track list, but was instead released on the follow-up album A Tune a Day.

The song "Love Has Passed Away" contains a reference to the Blondie song (I'm Always Touched by Your) Presence, Dear.

== Release ==
Music videos were released for 5 or the songs, mostly directed by Hammer & Tongs and Barry Maguire. The band appeared on popular TV and radio shows at the time, as well as several national and international tours.

"The Day Before Yesterday's Man" was used in the TV series Teachers, and the film Shooting Fish. The song was also selected to appear on a CMJ New Music Monthly highlights disc for the American market. The live performance of the song from Glastonbury 1997 was released on a BBC CD entitled Mud For It.

The song "Smile" was the theme tune for bank Smile.co.uk's TV advertisements, and was re-recorded for use as the main theme of the Australian Nine Network idents in 2008, and was also parodied in episode 5 of Peter Kay's Phoenix Nights. It has more recently been used in adverts for Arnold Clark Automobiles. In 2001, the single cover artwork for "Smile" was used by Anya Hindmarch on a fashion umbrella.

Several songs were also included on compilations such as Shine and The Best... Album in the World...Ever!.

A covermounted CD with the June 1997 issue of Select magazine features a rerecorded version of "I Don't Think So". An Xfm compilation album Gimme Shelter featured the song "Pie in the Sky".

== Critical reception ==
Professional ratings
Review scores
Source	Rating
Allmusic	4/5 stars
NME	8/10
Q	4/5 stars

The album received good reviews (8/10 in the NME and 4/5 in Q). It was described as "one of the finest Britpop records of 1997. Filled with beautiful pop melodies" by Virgin Radio, who went on to say that it was "an incredibly accomplished and compelling debut".

The song "Smile" was nominated for an Ivor Novello Award in 1998 for best contemporary song. In 2005 it was included in VH2's list of the best indie songs of all time. The UK release achieved a chart position of 23, however, the Japanese release (ザ・スーパーナチュラルズ 『スマイル』) was a bigger success with both sales and airplay, staying on the chart for 13 weeks.

== Track listing ==
Writing credits per booklet.

No.	Title	Writer(s)	Length
1.	"Please Be Gentle with Me"	James McColl	4:27
2.	"Smile"	McColl; Ken McAlpine; Alan Tilston	3:44
3.	"Glimpse of the Light"	McColl	4:11
4.	"Lazy Lover"	McColl; McAlpine; Tilston; Mark Guthrie; Derek McManus	3:09
5.	"Love Has Passed Away"	McColl	3:32
6.	"Dung Beetle"	McColl	5:19
7.	"Stammer"	McColl; McManus	2:52
8.	"I Don't Think So"	McColl	4:48
9.	"Pie in the Sky"	McColl; McAlpine	3:06
10.	"The Day Before Yesterday's Man"	McColl	3:22
11.	"Prepare to Land"	McColl; Guthrie	4:13
12.	"Trees"	McColl	2:43

Japanese edition bonus tracks
No.	Title	Length
13.	"Ken's Song"	2:14
14.	"Honk Williams"	4:34

== Personnel ==
Personnel per booklet.

The Supernaturals

- James McColl – vocals, guitar
- Derek McManus – guitar
- Ken McAlpine – keyboards
- Mark Guthrie – bass
- Alan Tilston – drums

Additional musicians

- R. E. Henderson – trumpet (track 9)

Production and design

- Pete Smith – producer (all except track 9), mixing (all except track 9)
- The Supernaturals – producer (track 9), mixing (track 9)
- Jim Brumby – engineer (tracks 1 and 11)
- Ben Darlow – engineer (tracks 2–4, 6, 8 and 12), mix engineer (all except track 9)
- Barry Hammond – engineer (tracks 5, 10 and 12)
- Jason Clift – engineer (track 7)
- Duncan Cameron – engineer (track 9) mix engineer (track 9)
- Abrahams Pants – design
- Donald Mine – Supernaturals portrait
- Chris Dwyer – cow shot
- Neil Mersh – live shots

== Chart positions ==
Chart (1997)	Peak position
UK Albums Chart	9
