= Runaway Train (Kid Galahad EP) =

Runaway Train EP

EP by Kid Galahad
- Released: 26 November 2001
- Genre: Indie
- Label: Ignition
- Producer: Jim Abbiss/Kid Galahad

Kid Galahad chronology
Where's my Gold? EP (2001)	Runaway Train EP (2001)	Gold Dust Noise (2002)

Runaway Train EP was the third of a trio of limited edition EP releases from the British band Kid Galahad that led up to the release of their debut album Gold Dust Noise the following summer. The title track "Runaway Train" was recorded in the studio and was produced by Jim Abbiss who had previously worked with artists such as UNKLE and DJ Shadow. Whilst the other three tracks were demo recordings produced by the band before signing to Ignition Records.

"Runaway Train" featured in the UK Channel 4 comedy drama Teachers.

== Track listing ==
All tracks written by A.Bull, D.Ody, P.Seaman, D.Strows

1. "Runaway Train"
2. "Dream it all Away"
3. "Brand New Shoes"
4. "Darklight"

== Personnel ==
- Ash Bull – vocals
- Dave Ody – Guitar
- Paul Seaman – Bass guitar
- D. "Wookie" Strows – drums
- Jim Abbiss – Production and Mixing (Tracks 1)
- Kid Galahad - Production and Mixing (Tracks 2, 3 and 4)
