= Principal (music) =

The section principal in an orchestra, as well as any large musical ensemble, is the lead player for each respective section of instruments. For example, there are multiple sections in an orchestra. The strings, woodwinds, brass, and percussion sections all have subsections. The first violins, second violins, violas, cellos, double basses, flutes, clarinets, oboes, bassoons, trumpets, trombones, French horns, tubas, and percussion are all subsections, each led by a principal player. The principal for each section is normally the most skilled and valuable player, selected through an audition process.

The section principal demonstrates leadership not only through a high standard of playing, but also through verbal communication and body language. The role of section principal requires one to play at a high level, and to be a team leader with competent people skills. Principals often serve the function of verbally communicating directions from the conductor to the rest of their section. Additionally, they are in charge of deciding bowings.

During rehearsals, principals often are expected to contribute musically and technically to the music-making process by making appropriate suggestions to the tutti players. Section players look to the principal to obtain entrance cues, and orient their playing to their leader's style, dynamics, articulation, and phrasing, among other things.

In addition to leading the section, principal players are responsible for playing any solos written for that voice in a given musical score. The principal first violin is called the concertmaster (or "leader" in the UK) and is considered the leader of not only the string section, but of the entire orchestra, subordinate only to the conductor.
