= You See Colours =

Studio album by Delays
- Released: 6 March 2006
- Studios: Real World, (Box, Wiltshire); Rockfield, (Rockfield, Monmouthshire); Dustsucker Sound, (Hackney, London)
- Genres: Indie rock; pop
- Length: 40:08
- Label: Rough Trade
- Producer: Graham Sutton

Delays chronology
Faded Seaside Glamour (2004)	You See Colours (2006)	Love Made Visible (2007)

Singles from You See Colours
- 1. "Valentine" Released: 20 February 2006; 2. "Hideaway" Released: 9 May 2006

You See Colours is the second studio album by British rock band Delays, released on 6 March 2006 through Rough Trade Records. The band released their debut studio album Faded Seaside Glamour in early 2004; by the year's end, they had composed 40 songs for its follow-up. Because the band's keyboardist Aaron Gilbert lost the only copies of their demos, lead singer Greg Gilbert decided to let the other members contribute to the writing. You See Colours was recorded at studios Real World, Rockfield, and Dustsucker Sound with producer Graham Sutton. Focusing on indie rock and pop songs, You See Colours spotlights Gilbert's vocals.

You See Colours received generally favourable reviews from critics, some of whom praised the musicianship. The album charted at number 24 in the UK Albums Chart, while its singles "Valentine" and "Hideaway" charted at number 23 and 35 in the UK Singles Chart, respectively. After Delays toured twice in the United Kingdom, in late 2005 and early 2006, "Valentine" was released as the lead single on 20 February 2006. After touring twice in the UK and playing festivals in Europe, "Hideaway" was released as the second single on 9 May 2006.

== Background ==
In April 2004, Delays released their debut studio album Faded Seaside Glamour, which charted at number 17 on the UK Albums Chart. All three of its singles; "Hey Girl", "Long Time Coming", and "Nearer Than Heaven"; reached the top 40 of the UK Singles Chart, with "Long Time Coming" peaking the highest at number 16. In October 2004, the band embarked on a tour in the United Kingdom; one show saw them debut six new songs. The non-album single "Lost in a Melody" was released in November 2004 and it peaked at number 28 in the UK Singles Chart.

At the end of 2004, singer Greg Gilbert said the band had 40 songs for their next album, which was expected for release in early 2005 under the name Action Reaction. By April 2005, the album was reported to be due for release later in the year. The band eventually accumulated 100 songs; keyboardist Aaron Gilbert lost the only copies on the band's demos, forcing Greg Gilbert to let the other members write songs for the band. Delays then spent time in a rehearsal room near Millbrook, Southampton, writing material for their next album. You See Colours was recorded at Real World Studios in Box, Wiltshire, Rockfield Studios in Rockfield, Monmouthshire, and Dustsucker Sound in Hackney, London, with producer Graham Sutton of Bark Psychosis. The latter and Robbie Nelson acted as engineers, with Sutton mixing the recordings at Dustsucker.

== Composition and lyrics ==
The music of You See Colours has been described as indie rock and pop. In contrast to the guitar-centered sound of Faded Seaside Glamour, You See Colours relies on pop songs and catchy melodies that highlight Gilbert's vocals. Entertainment.ie described the album as "a flurry of Fleetwood Mac songs sung in the style of a teen Brett Anderson [from Suede] with an '80s twist". Six of the album's tracks – "You and Me", "Valentine", "Too Much in Your Life", "Winter's Memory of Summer", "Lillian", and "Waste of Space" – were credited to both Greg and Aaron Gilbert, while the remainder were written solely by Greg Gilbert. The band had help with the arrangements of some of the songs from Trevor Horn ("Valentine"), Duncan Lewis ("Hideaway"), and Jon Kelly ("This Town's Religion" and "Given Time"). Sutton, who helped with some of the synthesizer arrangements, contributed to programming throughout the album.

You See Colours opens with "You and Me", which features strings in the style of Sigur Rós. The song's synthesizer part sets the tone for the rest of the album, separating it from Faded Seaside Glamour and earning a comparison to the music of A-ha. The track concludes with 15 seconds of guitar feedback and bells. Aaron Gilbert had written the string parts in a studio set-up he had in his room at Real World. Greg Gilbert asked for a copy of it and promptly wrote a chorus section. It was the last song to be completed for the album, recorded at Rockfield. "Valentine" is a disco and electronica song whose lyrics were influenced by the band's experience of a hurricane while on tour in the United States. The synthesizer line that opens the song gives way to dance-inspired drums and funk-like scratchy guitar parts. The guitar parts in "This Town's Religion" recall those by U2; bassist Colin Fox referred to it as the "love child of the [Stone] Roses and U2".

"Sink Like a Stone", which Fox said is indebted to the La's, came together during soundchecks while on tour with Snow Patrol. "Too Much in Your Life" begins as rock-like track before shifting into a slow-paced tempo with soft guitar strums and drums. Gilbert saw it as a lyrical companion to Faded Seaside Glamour track "Long Time Coming". "Winter's Memory of Summer", which has jangly guitar work, evolved out of another song that had been heavily worked on. Its stadium sound evokes the tonality of Manic Street Preachers' album This Is My Truth Tell Me Yours (1998). "Given Time" has a Pixies-indebted bass line and recalls the work of the La's. "Hideaway" is mostly an indie-rock song with 1980s vocal harmonies until, in its last minute, it becomes a psychedelic freakout. The song was intended for Faded Seaside Glamour, but the band were unable to finish it at the time. They had tried recording it, along with "Out of Nowhere", for an attempted album with Mike Hedges in 2001. "Lillian", an indie track, is anchored by an electro background. Fox described "Out of Nowhere" as "speeding across America" and "[s]oundtrackesque". The album's closing track "Waste of Space" is a piano-driven song.

== Release ==
In October 2005, Delays embarked on a tour in the United Kingdom and Ireland. On 19 October 2005, You See Colours was announced for release in five months' time. In February and March 2006, the band toured the UK again, this time alongside Nightmare of You and Captain. Some of the dates were cancelled because Gilbert was suffering from a throat infection. "Valentine" was released as the lead single on 20 February 2006; the seven-inch vinyl version includes "Talking Me Down". Two versions of the single were released on CD: the first with "Someday Soon You're Gonna Happen" and the second with "Shadows on Our School", a remix of "Valentine", and the music video for "Valentine" as B-sides. The video sees the band performing in front of a hurricane, a neon-lit city, and psychedelic imagery.

Delays toured the US alongside Franz Ferdinand and the Futureheads. You See Colours was released on 6 March 2006 through Rough Trade Records. Its cover depicts several layers of multi-coloured, tangled cables against a black background. In Japan, the album was jointly released by Rough Trade and Reservoir Records; this version includes "Someday Soon You're Gonna Happen", "Shadows on Our School", "Talking Me Down", and the music video for "Valentine" as bonus tracks. The band toured the UK before playing a series of festival shows across Europe, including a performance at Wakestock.

In August and September 2006, Delays appeared at V Festival, played in Mexico, and went on a UK tour. "Hideaway" was released as a single on 9 May 2006; the seven-inch vinyl version includes a cover of "Beautiful Boy (Darling Boy)" (1980) by John Lennon. Two versions of the single were released on CD: the first with "Broken Pylons" and the second with "Aglow Like Honey", a remix of "Valentine", and the music video for "Hideaway" as B-sides. In the music video for "Hideaway", the band drive around Miami, Florida, in a Ford Mustang. The video was initially planned for "You and Me" but it was later changed to "Hideaway".

== Reception ==
Professional ratings
Aggregate scores
Source	Rating
Metacritic	73/100
Review scores
Source	Rating
AllMusic	2.5/5 stars
Drowned in Sound	6/10
Gigwise	4/5 stars
God Is in the TV	4/5
MusicOMH	4/5 stars
NME	7/10
The Observer	4/5 stars
PopMatters	7/10
Stylus Magazine	B
Yahoo! Launch	7/10 stars

Music critics gave You See Colours generally favourable reviews. At Metacritic, which assigns a normalized rating out of 100 to reviews from mainstream publications, the album received an average score of 73 based on eight reviews.

God Is in the TV writer Ross Fairhurst praised the production as being "absolutely superb" with its subtle layers of instrumentation. Nick Southall of Stylus Magazine complimented the "fantastically produced" album, calling its sound "exquisite, futuristic and clean". musicOMH contributor Jeremy Lloyd found You See Colours to be a "more coherent collection of songs" than Delay's debut album with "at least eight numbers here that would effortlessly sail into the upper echelons of the chart". Gigwise's Lee Glynn said it is a "surprisingly sound-uncompromising album", the band having crafted a release that is "mature enough to stand on its own rather than be weighed down by comparisons to their last offering". AllMusic reviewer Sharon Mawer noted the album has "more numbers" in the vein of "Lost in a Melody" that have a "driving beat and a recognizable verse-chorus-verse that built to a crescendo and then musically fell off the edge, only to build again".

The Observer editor Paul Mardles wrote You See Colours has an "electronic pulse that, though disconcerting on the first few listens, complements the group's trademark blissful harmonies". In a review for NME, journalist Mark Beaumont noted that Gilbert had "sharpened his pop stiletto blade" since the band's first album. He added: "[n]o slack, no tack, no looking back: in career as in phosphorescent vocals, Delays soar above". Yahoo! Launch's James Marshall saw the album as a "delicious pop confection". PopMatters writer Ian Cohen said the album's "high points" create "an unattainable standard for the rest of the album", causing it to feel a "bit unbalanced". Tom Edwards of Drowned in Sound said the band had "found themselves at a loose end", adding they should be praised for "meeting this challenge head on". He called it "such a strong façade ... that it's only after a few listens that you realise it's not much more than a confidence trick".

You See Colours peaked at number 24 in the UK Albums chart. The album's singles, "Valentine" and "Hideaway", charted at number 23 and number 35 in the UK Singles Charts, respectively. Obscure Sound ranked the album at number 50 on their list of the best albums of 2006. Stylus included "Valentine" at number five on their list of the year's 50 best singles.

== Track listing ==
Credits adapted from the booklet of You See Colours. All songs produced by Graham Sutton.

No.	Title	Writer(s)	Length
1.	"You and Me"	Greg Gilbert; Aaron Gilbert	4:43
2.	"Valentine"	G. Gilbert; A. Gilbert	4:52
3.	"This Town's Religion"	G. Gilbert	3:08
4.	"Sink Like a Stone"	G. Gilbert	3:05
5.	"Too Much in Your Life"	G. Gilbert; A. Gilbert	4:38
6.	"Winter's Memory of Summer"	G. Gilbert; A. Gilbert	3:10
7.	"Given Time"	G. Gilbert	3:00
8.	"Hideaway" (Ends at ?, a short instrumental hidden track follows)	G. Gilbert	3:48
9.	"Lillian"	G. Gilbert; A. Gilbert	3:01
10.	"Out of Nowhere"	G. Gilbert	2:46
11.	"Waste of Space"	G. Gilbert; A. Gilbert	3:57
Total length:			40:08

== Personnel ==
Credits adapted from the booklet of You See Colours.

Delays

- Greg Gilbert – guitar, vocals
- Rowly – drums
- Colin Fox – bass, percussion, backing vocals
- Aaron Gilbert – sequencer, synths, backing vocals

Additional musicians

- Graham Sutton – additional synth arrangements, programming
- Trevor Horn – additional arrangement (track 2), vocal overdub (track 2)
- Duncan Lewis – additional arrangement (track 8)
- Jon Kelly – additional arrangement (tracks 3 and 7)

Production and design

- Graham Sutton – producer, engineer, mixing
- Robbie Nelson – engineer
- Paul Burgess – front cover artwork
- Jeff Teader – package design
- Roger Sargent – band photography

== Charts ==
Chart performance for You See Colours
Chart (2006)	Peak position
UK Albums (Official Charts)	24
