= Smile (bank) =

British bank

- Type: Trading name
- Industry: Banking
- Founded: 1999
- Headquarters: Manchester, England, UK
- Key people: Nick Slape (Chief Executive Officer); Bob Dench (Chairman)
- Products: Credit cards Loans; Mortgage loans Retail banking
- Parent: The Co-operative Bank
- Website: www.smile.co.uk

Smile is a British banking brand that operates as a trading division of The Co-operative Bank. It started as the UK's first fully digital bank in 1999, offering full-service current accounts, savings, ISAs, investments and credit cards. As of January 2026, the brand is no longer accepting account applications and is directing prospective customers to its parent.

== History ==
The Smile brand was launched in October 1999.

In July 2000, "moneybags.co.uk" rated Smile highly in terms of accessibility, citing its 'excellent interest rates, top functionality, nice appearance and lots of clear, helpful information in plain English'. Additionally, the "Internet Made Easy" magazine rated Smile as 'simply the best of the web'.

2001 saw Smile launch 'Smile invest', a collaboration with Fidelity which gave Smile customers an opportunity to expand their financial portfolios, and compare more shares and stocks. In 2002, Smile launched share dealing to help experienced and new investors build an online portfolio, with 24-hour access.

In 2003 there were record interim pre-tax profits for the tenth consecutive year. The first half of 2003 improved on the previous year, up 10% on 2002.

As part of this community outreach, Smile sponsored the Cape2cape challenge in 2004, where a team flew from the tip of Chile to the coast of Canada in a single plane. This was followed by Smile sponsoring the North West Comedy Awards in 2005.

In 2008, Smile launched an ethical policy vote, giving customers the opportunity to change the things that matter most to them. This included turning down business, including accounts for known arms dealers, cosmetic businesses which test on animals, and companies which affect the environment with dangerous chemicals.

As of January 2026, Smile's website is no longer accepting new account applications and is directing customers to its parent The Co-operative Bank instead.

== Advertising ==
In 2000, Smile launched a national rollout and a UK-wide ad campaign, featuring the song 'Smile' by The Supernaturals, under the authority of David Conway, the Co-Operative Bank's then-executive director of marketing. They also launched a series of web shorts, all aimed at promoting Smile's automatic cancellation from the customer's previous bank.

They also followed this up with stickers placed on bananas in Co-operative Food stores, with the phrase 'Top Banana' ('bananas' originally being a slang term for money), followed by the Smile URL. Bob Head, chief executive of Smile, said that new research suggested that "more than 11m Brits say bananas make them smile more than any other fruit."

Using direct mail campaigns, like pairs of underwear with the words 'other banks are pants' emblazoned on them, as well as toothbrushes to 'keep people smiling', Smile generally uses a humorous tone when speaking to its audience.

For Smile's tenth anniversary, in October 2009, the bank launched its 'Cheer Up Britain' campaign, showing various ‘unhappy’ celebrities and politicians (like Ann Widdecombe, Gordon Brown and Richard 'Victor Meldrew' Wilson) with a 'smile' in front of their faces. People were also encouraged to cheer up the people around them with starter packs like a joke glasses-and-mustache mask, a pink wig, feather boas and other humorous items.

== Outages ==
In July 2020 the website and mobile application suffered intermittent loss of service, commencing Sunday 5 July and continuing until Saturday 11 July. The outage was caused by a database problem after routine maintenance.
