= Keep It Simple (Delays song) =

Single by Delays

from the album Everything's the Rush
- B-side: "Cherry Cherry" (CD); "One More Lie in Pt.2" (7" vinyl 1); "Go Slowly" (7" vinyl 2)
- Released: 11 August 2008 (CD)
- Genre: Indie
- Length: 4:11
- Label: Fiction Records
- Songwriters: G Gilbert, A Gilbert

Delays singles chronology
"Hooray" (2008)	"Keep It Simple" (2008)

"Keep It Simple" is the second single released from Delays' third studio album, Everything's the Rush. Like the previous single it was available for pre-order, came in three formats and was thus inegelible for UK chart entry. It was released on 11 August 2008. The B-side of the single is a cover version of Neil Diamond's "Cherry Cherry".

== Music video ==
The music video for the song stars Ewen Macintosh ("Keith" from the UK comedy series The Office) as an overweight man jogging through North-East London, the video cuts between him jogging and the band playing the song in a front yard. After a while the man walks into a fast food outlet and orders a large unhealthy meal and attempts to jog and eat at the same time, only to result in him having a heart attack and dying in the middle of the road.

His spirit rises to heaven where angels shower him in fast food but after a while the angels turn into demons and begin hassling him. His spirit returns to his body and he wakes up with the fast food lying next to him. He takes a bite of the burger and walks off, much to the disapproval of the onlooking band.

In the making of the "Keep It Simple" video, keyboardist Aaron described the heaven/hell part as signifying that fast food is quite literally heaven and hell for you.

== Critical reception ==
An indieLondon review of the album stated that "Keep It Simple" "bounces shimmering piano hooks off crunching riffs and more strings to create another giddy treat." Ian Cohen of Pitchfork Media thought that "Keep it Simple", along with two other tracks from the album sounded "like Pavlovian biscuits of phony populism". Clash described it as an "epic heartbreak anthem" and "a melancholic salute to 60s pop in a way that only Delays can pull off".

== Track listing ==
CD single

1. "Keep It Simple"
2. "Cherry Cherry"
