= Love Made Visible =

EP by Delays
- Released: 5 November 2007
- Genre: Indie
- Label: Fiction Records

Delays chronology
You See Colours (2006)	Love Made Visible (2007)	Everything's the Rush (2008)

Love Made Visible is the first EP by British indie band Delays on Fiction Records. It was due to be released on 5 November 2007; however, on Amazon it was released on 12 November 2007. A music video was also made for the title track.

== Track listing ==
- CD1746674
1. "Love Made Visible"
2. "Panic Attacks"
3. "Slow Burn"
4. "You See Colours"
5. "We Together Make a City" (Love Made Visible Torchteam Remix)
