= Faded Seaside Glamour =

Studio album by Delays
- Released: 5 April 2004
- Studios: Rockfield, Rockfield, Monmouthshire; Dustsucker Sound, Hackney, London; Moles, Bath, Somerset
- Genres: Indie pop; dream pop
- Length: 42:12
- Label: Rough Trade
- Producers: Duncan Lewis; Delays; Graham Sutton

Delays chronology
Safety in Numbers (2001)	Faded Seaside Glamour (2004)	You See Colours (2006)

Singles from Faded Seaside Glamour
- 1. "Nearer Than Heaven" Released: 7 April 2003; 2. "Hey Girl" Released: 21 July 2003; 3. "Long Time Coming" Released: 19 January 2004

Faded Seaside Glamour is the debut studio album by English rock band Delays, released on 5 April 2004 through Rough Trade Records. After the end of their previous band Corky, the members formed Delays; lead singer Greg Gilbert recruited his brother Aaron, a keyboardist, into the band after hearing him play a loop. The band signed to Rough Trade Records after its founder Geoff Travis saw them perform live. Delays recorded the album in three months with producers Duncan Lewis and Graham Sutton at Rockfield Studios in Rockfield, Monmouthshire, Dustsucker Sound in Hackney, London, and Moles Studio in Bath, Somerset. Faded Seaside Glamour is an indie pop and dream pop album that has been compared to the works of Cocteau Twins, Geneva and The La's, and Greg Gilbert's vocals have been compared to those of Stevie Nicks and Elizabeth Fraser.

Music critics gave Faded Seaside Glamour generally favourable reviews; some critics praised the band's musicianship and others highlighted Gilbert's vocals. The album charted at number 17 in the United Kingdom and it was certified silver by the British Phonographic Industry (BPI). The lead single "Nearer Than Heaven" initially reached number 91 on the UK Singles Chart, but after its reissue in March 2004, it peaked at number 21. The second single, "Hey Girl", entered at number 40. In January 2004, "Long Time Coming" was released as the third single and peaked at number 16 on the UK Singles Chart. The latter release was followed the next month by a performance at the NME Awards. In July 2004, Delays toured the United States with Cardia and Paula Kelly. The band then returned to the UK, where they supported Franz Ferdinand and Snow Patrol, and ended the year with a headlining UK tour.

== Background and recording ==
Vocalist and guitarist Greg Gilbert, bassist Colin Fox and drummer Rowly performed as the Britpop act Corky, which also featured Gilbert's brother Aaron Gilbert on keyboards. They attracted some attention in their home city Southampton but broke up in 2001. The same year, the first three regrouped under the name Delays, taking influences from 1960s rock and the keyboard work of Cocteau Twins. Delays made CD samplers, which consisted of "Nearer Than Heaven", "You Wear the Sun" and "Zero Zero One", and sent them to record labels. They began recording their debut album with Mike Hedges in mid-2001 but it was later scrapped.

Gilbert's brother Aaron, a keyboardist and previously a member of Corky, was interested in techno music. At this point, he created a loop of what would become the song "Wanderlust". Greg played along to the loop, which marked Aaron's introduction to the band. Geoff Travis, the founder of Rough Trade Records, saw Delays perform live; he was impressed by the sound and promptly signed them. The band gave the label a five-song acoustic demo that featured "Hey Girl", "Satellites Lost", "Wherever You Fall I Die", "Overlover" and "Hideaway". They started touring with acts Tim Burgess of the Charlatans, the Sleepy Jackson and the Thrills, which brought Delays attention from critics in Europe and the United States.

Faded Seaside Glamour was recorded during three months; Aaron Gilbert had been a member of Delays for only a few months up to now. Duncan Lewis and the band produced tracks "Wanderlust", "Nearer Than Heaven", "You Wear the Sun", "Hey Girl", "There's Water Here", "Satellites Lost" and "One Night Away", all of which were recorded with engineer Phil Aul at Rockfield Studios in Rockfield, Monmouthshire, Wales. "Bedroom Scene" and "On" were recorded at Dustsucker Sound in Hackney, London while "Long Time Coming", "No Ending" and "Stay Where You Are" were recorded at Moles Studio in Bath, Somerset, all with producer and engineer Graham Sutton of Bark Psychosis. Paul Corkett also engineered "Long Time Coming", "No Ending" and "Stay Where You Are". Sutton then mixed the recordings at Dustsucker Sound.

== Composition ==
Tim Den of Lollipop Magazine described the album's title Faded Seaside Glamour as an "abandoned boardwalk" that "still soaks up and reflects the summer sun, but is no longer the vibrant, cherished locale showered with people's love". Gilbert said the album's working title was Take Some Home with You because the band members were "all telling people to 'take some (flyers) home with you' after the gigs". Greg Gilbert said they also considered titling the album Our True Intent Is All for Your Delight, which is a reference to a book of photography by John Hinde. Faded Seaside Glamour is an indie pop and dream pop album that evokes the sound of bands Geneva, Cocteau Twins and The La's, with elements of The Byrds and The Hollies. AllMusic reviewer MacKenzie Wilson said Gilbert provides a "lamblike falsetto, an intriguing arrangement that's both gentle and slightly unrefined" while Pitchfork contributor Stephen M. Deusner compared it to a "less abrasive Billy Corgan [of The Smashing Pumpkins] or a less earthy Mike Scott [of The Waterboys]". Some reviewers referred to Gilbert as the male version of Stevie Nicks from Fleetwood Mac or Cocteau Twins frontwoman Elizabeth Fraser.

The opening track "Wanderlust" follows a Stone Roses-lite groove and is anchored around calypso-esque steel drums with Greg and Aaron Gilbert singing vocal harmonies. "Nearer Than Heaven" consists of loud guitars and echo, and is in the style of the band Geneva. When Greg Gilbert wrote "Nearer Than Heaven" in 1998, he thought it dealt with Catholic guilt but in 2020 he said; "now I think it's about finding the transcendent in everyday life". The chorus section and vocal melody heard in "Long Time Coming" recall the later work of The Waterboys; on this track, Gilbert sings in a slightly rougher tone than that of the rest of the album. Aaron Gilbert wrote the track's synth part, in which he tried to emulate the sound of a creaking door, from a dream he had. The band wrote the song in the Gilberts' parents' house; Greg Gilbert said it is about their friend Steve, who died in a car crash in 2003.

Gilbert wrote the lyrics to "Bedroom Scene" in a field near his parents' house while its melody was borrowed from a song by The Smiths. It evokes "Rhiannon" (1976) by Fleetwood Mac due to its melancholy atmosphere; its muted piano saw comparison to the work of U2 and their album War (1983), and the palm muted guitar parts to the music of Mike and the Mechanics. "Bedroom Scene" was initially intended to be a B-side but the band liked the way the track sounded during recording. Aaron Gilbert often played the piano section when the rest of the band were preparing to rehearse, it eventually evolved into a song when the other members began playing along to it. On "No Ending", Greg Gilbert emulates the vocal style of Brett Anderson from Suede, while the music recalls the work of Big Star and Jeff Buckley. Greg Gilbert said the song was inspired by Michael Head and his previous band Shack.

The guitar pop song "You Wear the Sun" was also intended as a B-side. "Hey Girl" is reminiscent of the work of The Byrds and "There She Goes" (1988) by The La's. "Stay Where You Are" toys with funk, and includes elements of the sound of The Cure and electronic music, and is followed by acoustic ballads "There's Water Here" and "Satellites Lost". Gilbert said "There's Water Here" acts as a companion to "Wanderlust", highlighting the guitar riff and its lyrics as being related. "Satellites Lost" is about Greg Gilbert's anxiety about travelling. The Travis-lite song "One Night Away" was written in Edinburgh while listening to Big Star. The album concludes with the neo-psychedelic gospel track "On", which was referred to as the band's own iteration of "I Am the Resurrection" (1989) by The Stone Roses. Greg Gilbert said they wanted a counterpoint to the opening of "Wanderlust"; Aaron Gilbert came up with what his brother described as the "sound of ships leaving the harbour, filling out the album concept".

== Release ==
On 7 April 2003, "Nearer Than Heaven" was released as a single that also includes "Way Smooth" and "Over and Out" as B-sides. The music video for "Nearer Than Heaven" shows friends on the band members plugging headphones into soil and nearby trees in New Forest National Park. The following month, Delays embarked on a tour of the UK with Clearlake. "Nearer Than Heaven" was reissued on 22 March 2004; the CD version includes "Quiet" and a live version of "Long Time Coming" as the B-sides; the seven-inch vinyl edition includes a demo of "Whenever You Fall I Die" as the B-side; and the DVD version includes "Way Smooth", a demo of "Over and Out" and the music video for "Nearer Than Heaven".

"Hey Girl" was released as a single on 21 July 2003. Two editions were released on CD; the first with "Zero Zero One" and "Overlover" as extra tracks and the other includes "Whenever You Fall I Die" and the music video for "Hey Girl". The single was promoted with a tour of the UK with Easyworld. "Long Time Coming" was released as a single on 19 January 2004. The CD version includes "Chicago" as the B-side; the seven-inch vinyl edition includes "Hand Me Downs" as the B-side; and the DVD version includes "Hand Me Downs", "Swallowing the Silence" and the music video for "Long Time Coming". On 8 February 2004, Delays performed at London Astoria as part of a special NME Awards show.

Gilbert asked Rough Trade to contact Bodys Isek Kingelez with the intent of using one of his images for the album's cover. Rough Trade were unable to contract Kingelez so Gilbert began sketching out the cover; he used the same colour scheme as the cover of The Best of the Beach Boys 1970-1986: The Brother Years (2000) by the Beach Boys and the same font as the cover of Loveless (1991) by My Bloody Valentine.

Faded Seaside Glamour was released on 5 April 2004 through Rough Trade. The album came out as post-punk revival labelmates the Libertines and the Strokes were peaking in popularity, which was something Travis wanted Delays to resist. In June 2004, the band appeared at Isle of Wight, which was followed by a performance at the Fleadh festival. In July 2004, Delays toured the US for the first time alongside Cardia and Paula Kelly. In September 2004, Delays supported Franz Ferdinand on their headlining US tour, and went on a headlining UK tour in October and November 2004. "Wanderlust" was used as the B-side to the non-album single "Lost in a Melody", which was released in November 2004. The band ended 2004 supporting Snow Patrol at two of their headlining shows.

Faded Seaside Glamour was re-pressed on vinyl in 2023; Aaron Gilbert pushed for this edition to be released following the death of Greg Gilbert by cancer in 2021. A print was included that featured a painting that the latter Gilbert had made while dealing cancer, while a message from the former is included on the back of it.

== Reception ==
Professional ratings
Aggregate scores
Source	Rating
Metacritic	70/100
Review scores
Source	Rating
AllMusic	4/5 stars
Drowned in Sound	7/10
Gigwise	4/5 stars
God Is in the TV	3/5
The Guardian	4/5 stars
NME	7/10
No Ripchord	7/10
Pitchfork	6/10
Robert Christgau	(dud)
Stylus Magazine	C

Music critics gave Faded Seaside Glamour generally favourable reviews; at Metacritic, which assigns a normalized rating out of 100 to reviews from mainstream publications, the album received an average score of 70, which is based on 24 reviews.

When evaluating Gilbert's vocals, AllMusic reviewer MacKenzie Wilson complimented Greg Gilbert's voice and Delays' "honest to goodness melodic tones". Deusner said Gilbert has "an impressive voice: Earthbound, it has a grainy, adenoidal whine" that "sounds startling and strikingly androgynous" when reaching for high notes. The Guardian's Dorian Lynskey said Gilbert's "unashamedly effeminate, gossamer falsetto" acts as a "curveball", merging with "melodies so fresh they could have wafted in from across the Solent". Mike Davidson of Gigwise said Gilbert's "dreamy falsetto" helps separate the band from their peers, something Noel Murray of The A.V. Club echoed. According to No Ripchord writer D.C. Harrison, Gilbert is "in possession of a memorable voice that gives the song[s] an air of Cupid and Psyche '85 era Scritti Politti romanticism".

In a positive review, Wilson called Faded Seaside Glamour an "honest presentation" that displays the band's "crisp musicianship and the foursome's lush harmonies". Davidson praised its "considerable scope and ambition" as "magnificent". God Is in the TV writer Steven Daniels said Faded Seaside Glamour, unlike some albums that place the best tracks near the beginning, "picks up pace just when it needs to and there's no filler in sight". Deusner said Delays "never to rely on Gilbert's pipes to justify themselves" because they "bolster their ephemeral sound with studied songcraft and an array of touchstones". Hot Press's Phil Udell said the album has a "real uniqueness of spirit and approach at work here that few others have been able to match of late".

In a mixed review, Drowned in Sound's Tom Edwards wrote while Faded Seaside Glamour "falls somewhat flat on the quality meter", when the "formula works, the results are never less than glorious". He went to call nearly a third of it "devoted to namby-pamby ballads" that are "stripped of the band's trademark sugary hooks". Barry Nicolson of NME stated the album's main flaw is its "sugar-coated crystalline sheen that surrounds everything". Stylus Magazine reviewer Nick Southall wrote there are "[n]ice enough melodies and average tunes ... which makes Delays sound like a much better band than they actually are"; Harrison called the album a "proverbial mixed bag" that has "occasional moments of album filler". Music critic Robert Christgau gave the album a "dud" rating.

Faded Seaside Glamour peaked at number 17 in the UK Albums Chart; the British Phonographic Industry certified it silver. Initially, "Nearer Than Heaven" charted at number 91 in the UK Singles Chart. Its reissue peaked at number 21 in the UK and at number 25 in the Scottish Singles chart. "Hey Girl" charted at number 40 in the UK and at number 59 in Scotland. "Long Time Coming" charted at number 16 in the UK and at number 24 in Scotland.

== Track listing ==
Credits adapted from the booklet of Faded Seaside Glamour.

Faded Seaside Glamour track listing
No.	Title	Writer(s)	Producer	Length
1.	"Wanderlust"	Greg Gilbert; Aaron Gilbert	Duncan Lewis; Delays	3:58
2.	"Nearer Than Heaven"	G. Gilber	Lewis; Delays	3:28
3.	"Long Time Coming"	G. Gilbert; A. Gilbert	Graham Sutton	3:57
4.	"Bedroom Scene"	G. Gilbert; A. Gilbert	Sutton	3:37
5.	"No Ending"	G. Gilbert	Sutton	4:42
6.	"You Wear the Sun"	G. Gilbert	Lewis; Delays	2:59
7.	"Hey Girl"	G. Gilbert	Lewis; Delays	2:43
8.	"Stay Where You Are"	G. Gilbert; A. Gilbert	Sutton	4:44
9.	"There's Water Here"	G. Gilbert	Lewis; Delays	2:40
10.	"Satellites Lost"	G. Gilbert	Lewis; Delays	3:13
11.	"One Night Away"	G. Gilbert	Lewis; Delays	3:06
12.	"On"	G. Gilbert; A. Gilbert	Sutton	2:59

== Personnel ==
Credits adapted from the booklet of Faded Seaside Glamour.

Delays

- Greg Gilbert – lead vocals, guitar
- Colin Fox – bass, backing vocals
- Rowly – drums
- Aaron Gilbert – programming, keys, backing vocals

Production and design

- Duncan Lewis – producer (tracks 1, 2, 6, 7 and 9–11)
- Delays – producer (tracks 1, 2, 6, 7 and 9–11)
- Phil Ault – engineer (tracks 1, 2, 6, 7 and 9–11)
- Graham Sutton – producer (tracks 3–5, 8 and 12), engineer (tracks 3–5, 8 and 12), mixing
- Paul Corkett – engineer (tracks 3, 5 and 8)
- Jeff Teader – sleeve design
- Greg Gilbert – outside tray drawing

== Charts and certifications ==
=== Weekly charts ===
Chart performance for Faded Seaside Glamour
Chart (2004)	Peak position
UK Albums (Official Charts)	17

=== Certifications ===
Certifications for Faded Seaside Glamour
Region	Certification	Certified units/sales
United Kingdom (BPI)	Silver	60,000^{^}
^{^} Shipments figures based on certification alone.

== See also ==
- Further – the 1997 album by Geneva, a band that the music of Faded Seaside Glamour was compared to
