= Fast Food (1998 film) =

1999 film

- Directed by: Stewart Sugg
- Written by: Stewart Sugg
- Produced by: Phil Hunt
- Starring: Gerard Butler; Sean Hughes; Graham Turner; Douglas Henshall; Emily Woof; Miles Anderson; Danny Midwinter; Stephen Lord
- Release dates: 9 October 1998 (IFFMH); 28 January 2000 (United Kingdom)
- Country: United Kingdom
- Language: English

Fast Food is a 1998 British crime film starring Gerard Butler and written and directed by Stewart Sugg.

== Plot ==
Benny returns to the town of his youth to find the girl he's loved since childhood and runs into his four old criminal friends who have plans to rob a local gangster.
