= Delays =

English indie rock band

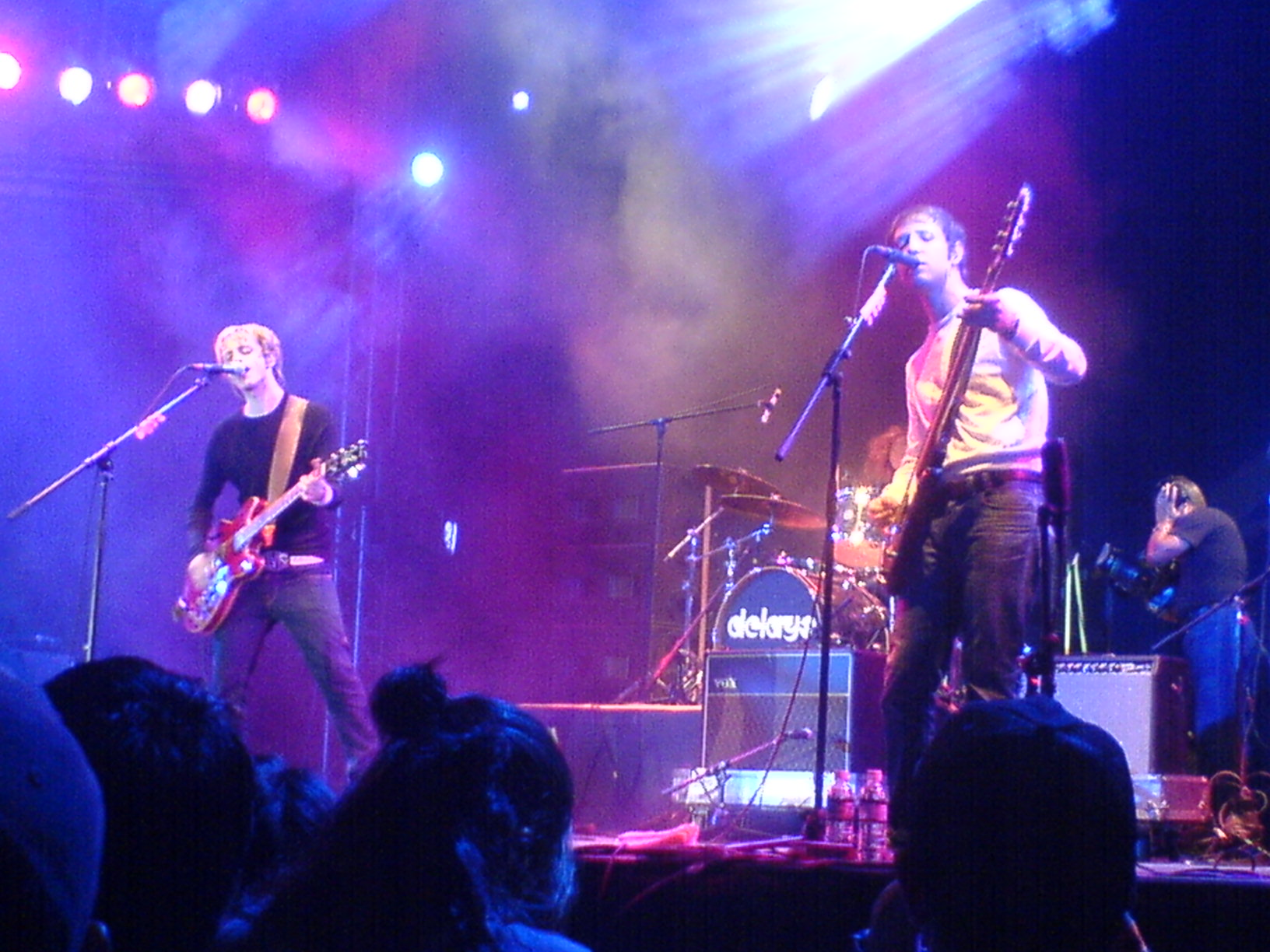
- Delays performing in 2006

Background information
- Origin: Southampton, England
- Genres: Indie rock, indie pop
- Years active: 2001–present
- Labels: Rough Trade; Fiction; Lookout Mountain
- Members: Aaron Gilbert; Colin Fox; Rowly
- Past members: Greg Gilbert

Delays are an English indie band formed in Southampton, which consisted of brothers Greg Gilbert and Aaron Gilbert, Colin Fox and Rowly until Greg Gilbert's death in 2021. The band's sound combines guitar and synths and featured Greg Gilbert's distinctive falsetto lead vocals. They have released four albums to date, the first three of which made the Top 30 in the UK Albums Chart.

== History ==
The band were originally formed under the name Corky, citing amongst their influences British bands, Manic Street Preachers and The La's. The original line-up consisted of Greg Gilbert, drummer Rowly, bassist Colin Fox and guitarist Dan Hall, who left before Greg's brother Aaron Gilbert was invited to join.

Under the name Idoru, they were signed to Blanco y Negro and released one EP with the label, Safety in Numbers EP, in November 2001.

=== Faded Seaside Glamour (2004) ===
"Nearer Than Heaven"
"Nearer Than Heaven" by Delays, from their album Faded Seaside Glamour.

They changed to their present name before signing to Rough Trade Records, and released their debut single "Nearer Than Heaven" in 2003. The band's debut album Faded Seaside Glamour was released in April 2004, and immediately broke into the Top 20 in the UK Albums Chart. On the back of support slots with bands such as Franz Ferdinand and the Manic Street Preachers, as well as their own worldwide tours, most of the band's singles have reached the Top 40 in the UK Singles Chart since their second single "Hey Girl" in July 2003.

=== You See Colours (2006) ===
Their second album, You See Colours, was released in March 2006, and saw a breakthrough when their songs began being used as backing music on the BBC Television football highlights show Match of the Day, and also commercially; "Long Time Coming" featured in national advertisement campaigns both in the UK and the US and on the premiere episode of the second season of Veronica Mars. The band played most of the major British festivals in the summer of 2006. In May of that year, Delays parted company with Rough Trade by mutual consent and signed to Fiction / Polydor in December. The music video for "Valentine" received regular play on MTV, and also gave them their first appearance on the Top of the Pops programme on the BBC.

=== Everything's the Rush (2008) ===
Their debut release on Fiction, Everything's the Rush was released in May 2008, and was recorded over a twenty-day period in Spain. The first single to be released from the album was "Hooray". This was preceded by an EP, Love Made Visible, released in November 2007. "Keep It Simple" was the next single released from Everything's the Rush. The video for the single starred Ewen Macintosh, who played Keith in The Office (the original UK programme).

In July 2008, Delays won the Writers' Choice award at The Mag Awards, presented by The Mag. Also in July 2008 Delays' song, "Are You Ready", was selected as the theme music for the online game Football Superstars.

In October 2008, Delays released Lost Tunes, an EP of assorted cover versions, for digital download sale.

=== Star Tiger Star Ariel (2010) ===
In March 2010, it was announced on the Delays official website that Star Tiger Star Ariel would be released on Lookout Mountain Records in June that year, with the opening single, "Unsung", released on 14 June. Despite becoming an instant fan-favourite as well as being very popular throughout the band, no chart success was to follow. The album takes its name from two British South American Airways airliners named 'Star Tiger' and 'Star Ariel' which disappeared in the Bermuda Triangle in the 1940s.

=== Fifth studio album ===
On 6 November 2012 the band went into the Rockfield Studios, Monmouth to begin recording their fifth studio album, which was scheduled for release in 2013. However, due to outside projects, including lead singer Greg Gilbert's interest in art, as well as three of the band members becoming fathers, the album has not yet been released. On 9 May 2014, Eddy Temple-Morris premiered a demo named "Wondrous Heavy" on Xfm.

Greg Gilbert died on 30 September 2021 at the age of 44 from bowel cancer.

== Band members ==
- Aaron Gilbert — keyboards, vocals
- Colin Fox — bass guitar, vocals
- Rowly — drums and percussion

Past members

- Greg Gilbert — lead vocals, guitar

== Discography ==
=== Studio albums ===
Title	Album details	Peak chart positions				Certifications
Title	Album details	UK	UK Indie	IRE	SCO	Certifications
Faded Seaside Glamour	Released: 5 April 2004; Label: Rough Trade (#RTRADCD114); Formats: CD	17	1	—	24	BPI: Silver
You See Colours	Released: 6 March 2006; Label: Rough Trade (#RTRADCD214); Formats: CD, LP	24	2	61	21	
Everything's the Rush	Released: 5 May 2008; Label: Fiction (#1758391); Formats: CD	26	—	—	25	
Star Tiger Star Ariel	Released: 21 June 2010; Label: Lookout Mountain (#LOOKCD03); Formats: CD	107	10	—	—	
"—" denotes items that did not chart or were not released in that territory.

=== EPs ===
As Idoru:

- Safety in Numbers EP (24 November 2001) – UK #182, Limited edition, 1500 copies released.

As Delays:

- Love Made Visible EP (5 November 2007)
- Lost Tunes (EP) October 2008

=== Singles ===
Year	Title	Peak chart positions			Album
Year	Title	UK	UK Indie	SCO	Album
2003	"Nearer Than Heaven"	91	12	—	Faded Seaside Glamour
2003	"Hey Girl"	40	3	59	Faded Seaside Glamour
2003	"Ride it On" (b/w The Veils)	105	33	—	Non-album single
2004	"Long Time Coming"	16	2	24	Faded Seaside Glamour
2004	"Nearer Than Heaven" (re-issue)	21	2	25	Faded Seaside Glamour
2004	"Lost in a Melody/Wanderlust"	28	2	31	Non-album single
2006	"Valentine"	23	2	12	You See Colours
2006	"Hideaway"	35	1	20	You See Colours
2008	"Hooray"	103	—	29	Everything's the Rush
2008	"Keep It Simple"	—	—	—	Everything's the Rush
2010	"Unsung"	—	—	—	Star Tiger Star Ariel
"—" denotes items that did not chart or were not released in that territory.
