= The Furze =

British indie band

- Also known as: Kid Galahad, Kid G
- Origin: Maidenhead, England, UK
- Genres: Indie
- Years active: 2001 – present
- Labels: Ignition, Three-Sixty
- Members: Ash Bull; Dave Ody; Paul Seaman "Wookie" Strows
- Website: www.thefurze.net

The Furze were a British indie band from Maidenhead, Berkshire, England. The members of the band recorded together for more than ten years, and the same line-up previously performed under the name Kid Galahad. The band’s name is a reference to Furze Platt, the suburb of Maidenhead where the members originated.

Their music style has been compared to that of Beck and Jane's Addiction. The band supported a number of prominent artists at concerts around the world, including Marillion, Kaiser Chiefs, Supergrass, Oasis, Kings of Leon and Elliott Smith. The band bemoaned the lack of live music venues and outlets for local talent in the Maidenhead area, and as a result invested in Denmark Studios in the town.

== Kid Galahad ==
The four band members met in 1997 whilst attending Furze Platt School in Maidenhead. The band honed their skills in live performances and homemade recordings. One of their early demos was given to long-time friend and DJ James Lavelle, who championed the band, along with the independent Ignition record label, which signed the band in 2000. Their recordings for the label were produced by Jim Abbiss (who had previously worked with The Music, DJ Shadow and Unkle amongst others), and the band’s first studio release was the Stealin' Beats EP in May 2001. As well as Abbiss' work on the title track, this EP also contained two live tracks and an original demo recorded in lead singer Ash’s back garden. This EP was named "single of the week" by NME magazine and BBC Radio 1.

Kid Galahad’s second release was the Where’s My Gold? EP in July 2001. Like its predecessor, the EP showed off the band’s eclectic style and mixed studio and live recordings. It was named single of the week by MTV. Finally, a trio of limited edition EP releases was completed in November 2001, with the release of the Runaway Train EP. These releases also coincided with the band touring with bands such as Vex Red, Tetra Splendour and The Electric Soft Parade.

Kid Galahad’s debut album Gold Dust Noise was released on 20 May 2002. The album was critically well received, though some journalists regarded the album with a little disappointment given the strength of the band's previous EPs. A further single, "Swimming to Shore", was released on 10 June 2002 to promote the album. However, the album failed to make the Top 100 on the UK album chart.

Splitting from Ignition records, the band took some time off to work on some new songs and the soundtrack to the film Happily Even After. These two albums were both released in 2006 on the Three-Sixty record label. A subsequent album, The Bedroom Tapes, was released on 20 February 2006, and was described as "experiments in stereo recording". The film soundtrack was released later in June the same year.

These albums were released without any publicity from the members of the band, only a statement on the record label website stating that the band had gone missing in Cornwall: "All that was found in the car was a pair of Wallace and Gromit Boxer shorts and a tape in the player of their Triumph Herald." This story facilitated the transformation and relaunch of the band as The Furze.

Just a month after the final Kid Galahad release, the first single by The Furze, "Carry Me Home" was released on Three-Sixty records. This was followed in March 2007 by the single "I'm on Fire" and then the album Subterranean Kicks in May 2007. The press release suggesting the band had gone missing in Cornwall may have also been a reference to the fact that the band went to the Sawmills Studios to record Subterranean Kicks.

The band went on hiatus later in 2007.

== Music use in other media ==
- "Stealin' Beats" was used in the Konami PS2 game Dancing Stage MegaMix.
- A number of Kid Galahad tracks were used in the UK comedy drama Teachers, including "Stealin' Beats" (series two, episode two), "Distant Sunshine" and "Pack it In" (series two, episode five), "Runaway Train" (series two, episode eight), "I Don't Wanna Play" (series three, episode one), "Distant Sunshine" (series three, episode two) and "Swimming to Shore" (series three, episode four).

== Subsequent projects ==
- Dave Ody released a solo album, Geen, through Line Out Records. In 2008 he formed the band Mothboxer with Phil Davies and Jon Hawes and Robbie Burley. The band played a few gigs in London and the South East in 2008 and 2009. Mothboxer's debut album was released in 2010, followed by Frequency in 2011, Three in 2012, and Death Valley Blue in 2013.
- Singer Ash Bull ran a recording and rehearsal studio in Maidenhead. He also formed a new band, Me and The Beast, featuring Wooky (drums), Carly Cunningham (vocals) and Damien Bidmead (bass). After winning Live and Unsigned, the group disbanded.
- Ash Bull and Damian Bidmead went on to form Sometimes King with Julian Gabriah.
- In 2012, the band re-issued its Skeleton EP on Bandcamp, as well as the self-released singles "I Don't Belong" and "Up In Arms".

== Discography ==
=== Albums ===
As Kid Galahad

- 2002 – Gold Dust Noise
- 2006 – Happily Even After
- 2006 – The Bedroom Tapes

As The Furze

- 2007 – Subterranean Kicks

=== Singles/EPs ===
As Kid Galahad

- 2001 – "Stealin' Beats EP"
- 2001 – "Where's my Gold? EP"
- 2001 – "Runaway Train EP"
- 2002 – "Swimming to Shore"

As The Furze

- 2006 – "Carry me Home"
- 2007 – "I'm on Fire"
