= List of Teachers (British TV series) episodes =

Teachers is a British television comedy drama series, created by Tim Loane and was produced by Tiger Aspect Productions for Channel 4 between 2001 and 2004. It follows the daily lives of the teachers of the Summerdown Comprehensive (later Wattkins School), a secondary school situated in Bristol. It is not to be confused with either the 2006 American series, which is loosely based on it, or the 2016 American series, which has entirely no connection to it.

During the course of the programme, 40 episodes of Teachers aired over four series, between 21 March 2001 and 21 December 2004.

== Series overview ==
Series	Episodes	Originally released	
Series	Episodes	First released	Last released
1	8	21 March 2001	9 May 2001
2	10	13 March 2002	15 May 2002
3	13	6 August 2003	29 October 2003
4	9	26 October 2004	21 December 2004

== Episodes ==
=== Series 1 (2001) ===
No. overall	No. in series	Title	Directed by	Written by	Original release date	Prod. code	Viewers (millions)
1	1	"Episode 1"	Richard Dale	Tim Loane	21 March 2001	101	2.65
The first episode introduces the main characters at the beginning of a new term; Kurt, Brian, and Susan celebrate Simon's birthday by breaking into the school. After facing the wrath of Jenny, Simon seeks relationship advice from Susan.
2	2	"Episode 2"	Richard Dale	Julie Rutterford	28 March 2001	102	2.35
Simon suffers under Jenny as Acting Head of Year when Arnie is found with cannabis; this results in a drugs talk and Simon upsetting new girlfriend, Maggie. Susan prepares to apply for the role of Head of Year herself. Kurt and Brian on the other hand, face real problems when they realise that they have not prepared for parents evening.
3	3	"Episode 3"	Richard Dale	Andrew Rattenbury	4 April 2001	103	2.31
Simon's personal life suffers when his dad invites his girlfriend and her daughter to move in with them; he seeks further advice from Susan regarding Maggie as she is still upset with him.
4	4	"Episode 4"	Jeremy Lovering	Tim Loane	11 April 2001	104	2.12
Simon tries to help Pauline and Cheryl sort out problems with their love lives; this all goes disastrously wrong when he mentions the problems to Kurt and Brian. Alongside this, Simon gets concerned that his relationship has hit a low point sexually as it becomes more serious.
5	5	"Episode 5"	Jeremy Lovering	Julie Rutterford	18 April 2001	105	2.16
Sharing Kurt and Brian's flat becomes too much for Simon, so after much list writing he decides to move in with Maggie. Between this and the flat warming party, Simon and Jenny's friendship becomes less icy. After a claustrophobic incident in a cupboard, Simon feels guilty and confused.
6	6	"Episode 6"	Jeremy Lovering	Andrew Rattenbury	25 April 2001	106	< 2.21
Susan is under great pressure with the organisation of an open evening when she makes a massive decision about her marriage; she is then deeply upset that Simon lets her down and does not support her.
7	7	"Episode 7"	Sallie Aprahamian	Andrew Rattenbury	2 May 2001	107	2.12
While Simon faces the truth about his father, Summerdown School is littered (literally) with pornographic images. Simon finds himself between a rock (Pauline's chest) and a hard place (Bob's office) which is something he cannot get someone else to do.
8	8	"Episode 8"	Sallie Aprahamian	Tim Loane	9 May 2001	108	2.23
Simon is haunted by nightmares as his job interview (for a permanent post) approaches. While initially Kurt and Brian want Simon to get the job, they are soon distracted by a female applicant. The series culminates in a Christmas party where Jenny does something she might come to regret.

=== Series 2 (2002) ===
No. overall	No. in series	Title	Directed by	Written by	Original release date	Prod. code	Viewers (millions)
9	1	"Episode 1"	Peter Lydon	Julie Rutterford	13 March 2002	201	2.62
It is the start of a new year at Summerdown School, and there are two new members of staff. Simon worries about falling into the same old routine while Kurt is still trying to dump Carol. Susan finds herself with a crush on JP, the new French teacher.
10	2	"Episode 2"	Peter Lydon	Julie Rutterford	20 March 2002	202	2.19
Kurt and Brian concoct a scheme to try and save Kurt from Carol; Penny gets dragged unknowingly into the mess. Penny tries to help Simon with his new 'identity crisis' while Jenny takes drastic measures to save Kurt.
11	3	"Episode 3"	John Alexander	Richard Stoneman	27 March 2002	203	2.11
As the school embarks on a crackdown on facial hair, Susan has her own similar issue. Brian and Simon discuss their lack of sexual activity since encounters with Jenny. On a more serious note, the lads find themselves talking to Alec (a psychologist) about their problems and Simon makes a disastrous error in judgement with regards to Susan.
12	4	"Episode 4"	John Alexander	Andrew Rattenbury	3 April 2002	204	2.39
Brian finds himself having doubts about his sexuality after a careers test. Kurt, Simon, and Susan take advantage of this, but JP's sporting skills put Brian straight. Jenny feels let down after organising the career fair and Kurt worries about the consequences of teasing Brian.
13	5	"Episode 5"	John Alexander	Richard Stoneman	10 April 2002	205	2.21
Susan starts to feel uncomfortable living with Jenny as her infatuation with Alec grows. As the consequences of this spread to the English department, Brian, Penny, and Simon all suffer and sympathise with Susan.
14	6	"Episode 6"	Susanna White	Julie Rutterford	17 April 2002	206	2.56
Clare decides that the staff must allow the students more time to talk to them; open surgery at all lunchtimes is to follow. However, much to Simon, Kurt, and Brian's disgust, JP somehow manages to avoid this. Bob undergoes a rebirth and Penny continues to cause a path of destruction!
15	7	"Episode 7"	Susanna White	Charlie Martin	24 April 2002	207	2.34
After Bev comes back into the school and gives a talk about motherhood, Susan finds herself unexpectedly feeling broody; a search for a suitable father follows and Carol has a new boyfriend on the horizon.
16	8	"Episode 8"	Susanna White	Ed Roe	1 May 2002	208	2.56
Simon's life crisis hits an all-time high as he realises just how boring his life is. After a rash decision, which has massive consequences, he finds his life will never be the same again.
17	9	"Episode 9"	Reza Moradi	Andrew Rattenbury	8 May 2002	209	2.15
After Simon has left the English Department in the lurch, Penny has to take on a much larger workload; Jenny uses her new-found energy to take her under her wing and prepare her. Susan, Kurt, and Brian decide that Jenny cannot balance work and relationships.
18	10	"Episode 10"	Reza Moradi	Richard Stoneman	15 May 2002	210	2.53
Penny shows Simon's replacement, Matt, around the school before the Christmas party. While she forms a close relationship with Matt, Kurt and Brian spend the evening wondering how or who they will pull!

=== Series 3 (2003) ===
No. overall	No. in series	Title	Directed by	Written by	Original release date	Prod. code	Viewers (millions)
19	1	"Episode 1"	Brian Kelly	Ed Roe	6 August 2003	301	2.74
The new series begins with Kurt explaining his theory of 'Ugly Men'. Kurt then suffers from a personal crisis as Liz begins to gossip about what happened after the Christmas party, and Lindsay opens Kurt and Brian's eyes about the gender divide.
20	2	"Episode 2"	Brian Kelly	Richard Stoneman	13 August 2003	302	2.55
While Brian explores if drinking vodka and tonic, rather than beer, makes a difference to his urinary needs, Lindsay helps Penny to understand what makes her annoying. Although Penny is trying to better herself, Liz and her are still at loggerheads.
21	3	"Episode 3"	Brian Kelly	Andrew Rattenburry	20 August 2003	303	2.20
Bob has resorted to sleeping in the gym store room and Brian has to address why his lessons are 'boring', or he will face Mrs. Webb. Kurt can't understand Brian's problems as he has far more pressing issues; a parent of one of his students shows an interest in him, that is, until she smells his breath. Halitosis aside, Kurt decides to quit smoking.
22	4	"Episode 4"	Otto Bathurst	Richard Stoneman	27 August 2003	304	2.43
While Bob moves up the property ladder as he moves a bed and television into his office, Kurt, Brian, Lindsay, and Matt pull straws to see who has to address his personal hygiene. Bob takes his relationship with Liz far too seriously by speaking to Kayla, which has dire consequences.
23	5	"Episode 5"	Otto Bathurst	Charlie Martin	3 September 2003	305	2.35
Lindsay is struggling to come to terms with her fast approaching 30th birthday, which she shares with Matt's wife. While Kurt and Brian are convinced that Matt's wife is highly attractive, jealous Penny tells them she is disabled. Penny seeks her revenge with Matt.
24	6	"Episode 6"	Otto Bathurst	Richard Stoneman	10 September 2003	306	2.26
After a record number of staff are off work with stress, Clare assigns the remaining staff 'stress partners'; Matt and Lindsay think they've hit gold when they have to work together. As their friendship grows, Penny gets exceedingly jealous and tells Kurt and Brian that Lindsay is mentally ill; Lindsay and Matt seek revenge in the only way fit.
25	7	"Episode 7"	Jonathan Fox Bassett	Ed Roe	17 September 2003	307	2.62
Kurt and Brian have a surprise when a face from the past returns to Summerdown; despite his reservations, Simon finds himself back in the classroom alarmingly quickly. Simon makes a huge mistake when he tries to help Brian chat up the fit dinner lady, and Kurt makes a life altering bet based on Simon's year travelling.
26	8	"Episode 8"	Jonathan Fox Bassett	Tony Basgallop	24 September 2003	308	2.47
While Simon worries about working with his replacement and wonders why everyone likes him so much, Matt has to step up to the mark to fill Bob's shoes (as it were). The school has a weapons amnesty which leaves the weapons in dangerous hands.
27	9	"Episode 9"	Jonathan Fox Bassett	Ed Roe	1 October 2003	309	2.43
Morale is at a low when Clare cancels the Christmas party; this is reinforced when Kurt and Brian receive a card addressed to 'Kurt and Bryony'. Simon's meddling causes massive changes and Kurt and Brian search for new best friends.
28	10	"Episode 10"	Susanna White	Andrew Rattenbury	8 October 2003	310	2.09
Carol's baby has an adverse effect on Clare, who begins acting rather oddly; the baby also causes much excitement because no one is brave enough to look at it to see who the father is. Bob begins to open up to his class and share some of his best kept secrets (much to their disgust), and Kurt carries on worrying if it is possible for him to be the father of Carol's baby (despite the minor issue that they didn't have sex!). Meanwhile, Lindsay is struggling with mixed messages from Clare and has to avoid alcohol for a week or so.
29	11	"Episode 11"	Susanna White	Jack Lothian	15 October 2003	311	1.99
Brian finally finds himself in the first flushes of romance; however, he has no idea how to behave and seeks advice from the worst possible people. Bob misunderstands him and wants to share his love of Wham!
30	12	"Episode 12"	Andrew Lincoln	Richard Stoneman	22 October 2003	312	1.89
After a race goes very wrong, Kurt finds himself with a new job and a whole new list of problems, and Brian has to face up to his responsibilities. Despite Kurt's quick discovery that he is healthy, he continues to blame, and relies on, Brian for everything; this is heightened on Sports Day.
31	13	"Episode 13"	Andrew Lincoln	Charlie Martin	29 October 2003	313	2.32
Lindsay and Matt's friendship grows after a drunken kiss; despite avoiding each other and their eternal embarrassment, they cannot keep apart. Lindsay tries to put herself off Matt, by talking about his beautiful wife and listening to his tales about his 'multiple shagging disorder', but nothing works.

=== Series 4 (2004) ===
No. overall	No. in series	Title	Directed by	Written by	Original release date	Prod. code	Viewers (millions)
32	1	"Episode 1"	Barnaby Southcombe	Richard Stoneman	26 October 2004	401	2.11
After a hideous and unfortunate car accident, Lindsay, Penny, and Bob are the only few remaining Summerdown teachers left to merge with a new school. Despite Clare's best efforts to make the staff bond, Damien and Ben ignore Penny and Lindsay's best efforts at friendship. Bob has undergone a drastic change, which is marked by a new toupee, and is now hated by Clare.
33	2	"Episode 2"	Barnaby Southcombe	Ed Roe	2 November 2004	402	2.31
Ben is petrified when he has to guide a group of OAPs around the school and, at the other end of the scale, during a session in the library Penny finds herself a new (teenage) boyfriend. Meanwhile, Bob is still discussing his 'fiancée' Sundander Sunitra (secretly hiding the fact his 'bid' for a Thai bride has been rejected on terms of his age) and also plotting to have Ewan sacked.
34	3	"Episode 3"	Barnaby Southcombe	Charlie Martin	9 November 2004	403	2.29
During Gay and Lesbian Awareness Week, Ewan finds himself in an uncomfortable position with a student, and Clare wonders how lesbians 'function'. After some disastrous advice, Ewan finds himself face to face with a Freddie Mercury wannabe. Liz worries about Kayla's non-existent sex life (despite the fact her daughter is only 14), and Lindsay doesn't know why she'd make a good lesbian.
35	4	"Episode 4"	Sean Grundy	Linton Chiswick	16 November 2004	404	2.17
Lindsay is made an example of during Fat Week and Ewan, Damien, Penny, and Ben try to 'help' her diet. Meanwhile, Penny is snubbed by Anthony, and Bob finds himself in a frenzy after his vasectomy.
36	5	"Episode 5"	Sean Grundy	Jack Lothian	23 November 2004	405	2.03
Bob is very excited about meeting his new Thai bride, Ping, but she is far more interested in Ewan. Ben takes Religious Tolerance week very seriously which results in a mini-war between the students.
37	6	"Episode 6"	Sean Grundy	Tony Basgallop	30 November 2004	406	< 1.95
Penny's family history is uncovered and she takes a turn for the worse this week. Meanwhile, the issues of Racial Awareness Week extend to penis size, and Bob's sex life is suffering.
38	7	"Episode 7"	Iain B. MacDonald	Charlie Martin	7 December 2004	407	1.75
Damien finds himself attracted to the new supply teacher; however, after a cooking incident, he is rendered temporarily useless.
39	8	"Episode 8"	Iain B. MacDonald	Richard Stoneman	14 December 2004	408	< 1.89
After a Ouija board, Ben appreciates how he has annoyed the gods in every religion. He thinks he is going to die and so converts to each religion for a day. It's Bob's stag do in Dublin, which everyone tries their hardest to avoid, and the consequences of Penny's behaviour start to hit her.
40	9	"Episode 9"	Iain B. MacDonald	Ed Roe	21 December 2004	409	1.80
As Ofsted approaches, Clare concocts a plan to fool the inspector; however, when the fake classes do not work, Ewan is left to save the day. The final episode culminates in Bob and Ping's wedding.
