= Teachers (British TV series) =

British television comedy drama series (2001–2004)

- Created by: Tim Loane
- Starring: Andrew Lincoln; Adrian Bower; Raquel Cassidy; Navin Chowdhry; Nina Sosanya; Gillian Bevan; Ursula Holden-Gill; Lloyd McGuire; Ellen Thomas; Tamzin Malleson; James Lance; Vicky Hall; Lee Williams; Mathew Horne; James Corden
- Ending theme: "The Boy with the Arab Strap" by Belle and Sebastian
- Country of origin: United Kingdom
- Original language: English
- No. of series: 4
- No. of episodes: 40 (list of episodes)

Production
- Executive producer: Jane Fallon
- Running time: 45–50 minutes
- Production company: Tiger Aspect Productions

Original release
- Network: Channel 4
- Release: 21 March 2001 – 21 December 2004

Related
- Teachers

Teachers is a British television comedy-drama series, created by Tim Loane and originally shown on Channel 4. The series follows a group of secondary school teachers in their daily lives.

In the first series, probationary teacher Simon Casey (Andrew Lincoln) is the protagonist; later series have an ensemble cast. The cast changes dramatically, with few original characters remaining by the fourth series. While some of these disappearances are explained, others are not.

The first three series are set in the fictional Summerdown Comprehensive, which merges with another school in the fourth series to form Wattkins School. The first three series were filmed at the former Merrywood School and the fourth was filmed at the former Lockleaze school in Bristol, England.

Teachers was nominated for six BAFTA awards between 2002 and 2004, and was nominated for Best Comedy Drama at the British Comedy Awards in 2003. In January 2005, after a muted reception to the fourth series, Channel 4 announced that Teachers would not continue for a fifth series. A short lived American version was aired in 2006.

Since mid-2020 the series has been available on UK and Australian Netflix. The series is also available on All 4 and PlutoTV streaming service.

== Episodes ==
Series	Episodes	Originally released	
Series	Episodes	First released	Last released
1	8	21 March 2001	9 May 2001
2	10	13 March 2002	15 May 2002
3	13	6 August 2003	29 October 2003
4	9	26 October 2004	21 December 2004

== Themes ==
Like many sitcoms Teachers had certain themes that it maintained through every episode. These included:

- Appearances of animals, particularly donkeys, in unusual places. Others seen include lions, penguins and sheep. In all such appearances, the teachers and students are completely oblivious to these animals.
- A staffroom scene early in the episode, usually with an announcement by the head teacher Clare to set up one of the plots or premises of the episode.
- The name of the day written in a variety of ways in the scenery, a prop or a body adornment.
- Smoking: a lot of the scenes in all episodes, primarily through the first three series, feature members of the cast smoking as they banter
- The pub is the setting where nearly every episode of Teachers starts, usually with the teachers having immaturely themed conversations.

Every episode featured contemporary music, usually with clips of at least five songs (regularly including the bands The Bluetones, Terrorvision, The Soundtrack of our Lives, The Killers, The Darkness, Shed Seven, Feeder, The Dandy Warhols, Starsailor, Mercury Rev, The Hives, Athlete, I Am Kloot, The Libertines, Ash, and Supergrass), and the soundtrack to all four series has been released on CD by the Channel 4 shop.

The theme tune is the solo section of The Boy With The Arab Strap by Belle and Sebastian.

== Reception ==
=== Ratings ===
Viewing figures available from BARB.

Series	Timeslot	Episodes	First aired		Last aired		Rank	Avg. viewers (millions)
Series	Timeslot	Episodes	Date	Viewers (millions)	Date	Viewers (millions)	Rank	Avg. viewers (millions)
1	Wednesday 9:00 pm	8	21 March 2001	2.65	9 May 2001	2.23	N/A	N/A
2	Wednesday 9:00 pm	10	13 March 2002	2.62	15 May 2002	2.53	7	2.37
3	Wednesday 9:00 pm	13	6 August 2003	2.74	29 October 2003	2.32	11	2.33
4	Tuesday 10:00 pm	9	26 October 2004	2.11	21 December 2004	1.80	N/A	N/A

=== Awards and nominations ===
- BAFTA TV Awards
  - 2003: Best Drama Series – Jane Fallon, Rhonda Smith (nomination)
- BAFTA TV Craft Awards
  - 2002: Best New Director (Fiction) – Richard Dale (nomination)
  - 2003: Best New Writer – Ed Roe (nomination)
  - 2003: Best New Writer – Charlie Martin (nomination)
  - 2004: Best New Writer – Jack Lothian (nomination)
  - 2004: Best New Director (Fiction) – Andrew Lincoln (nomination)
- British Comedy Awards
  - 2003: Best TV Comedy Drama (nomination)
- Royal Television Society Awards
  - 2002: Best Drama Series (nomination)
  - 2004: Best Drama Series (nomination)

== Home media ==
=== VHS & DVD ===
Series	Release date			No. of discs	BBFC rating
Series	VHS	Region 2 DVD (Original)	Region 2 DVD (Re-release)	No. of discs	BBFC rating
Series 1	11 August 2003	11 August 2003	24 September 2007	2	15
Series 2	29 September 2003	29 September 2003	24 September 2007	3	15
Series 3	—N/a	1 November 2004	24 September 2007	4	15
Series 4	—N/a	3 October 2005	—N/a	3	15
Collection sets
Series 1–2	—N/a	29 September 2003	—N/a	4	15
Series 1–3	—N/a	1 November 2004	—N/a	9	15
Series 1–4	—N/a	6 November 2006	2 September 2013	12	15

=== Soundtracks ===
- Teachers: A Class Soundtrack (15 September 2001)
- Teachers 2: Back To School (15 April 2002)
- Teachers 3: A New Term (2 December 2002)
- Teachers 4: Top of the Class (8 November 2004)
