= Trevor Horn discography =

This is the discography of English record producer, singer, and bassist Trevor Horn.

== Solo and related ==
- Trevor Horn/Lol Creme/Yiannis Kotsiras – "Pass the Flame" (single, 2004)
- Various artists – Produced by Trevor Horn (compilation, 2004)
- The Producers – Made in Basing Street (2012)
- Trevor Horn – The Reflection: Wave One – Original Sound Track (2017)
- Trevor Horn – Reimagines the Eighties (2019)
- Trevor Horn – Reimagines the Eighties (Instrumentals) (2019)
- Trevor Horn – Echoes: Ancient & Modern (2023)

=== Live recordings ===
- Produced by Trevor Horn: A Concert for the Prince's Trust – Live at Wembley Arena London 2004 (DVD, 2005)
  - Bonus material includes: Documentary about the concert; VH1 UK TV special "Frankie Say Reform", with audition casting Ryan Molloy
- Trevor Horn and Friends: Slaves to the Rhythm (DVD release of the same concert at Wembley Arena, 2008)
  - Bonus material includes: Documentary; "Frankie Say Reform" special; juke box facility; Dolby Digital 5.1 mix concert only

== The Buggles ==
- The Age of Plastic (1980)
- Adventures in Modern Recording (1981)

== Art of Noise ==
- Into Battle with the Art of Noise (EP, 1983)
- Who's Afraid of the Art of Noise? (1984)
- Daft (compilation, 1986)
- The Seduction of Claude Debussy (1999)
- Reduction (2000)
- Reconstructed (2004)
- Daft as a Brush! (2019)

== Yes ==
- Drama (1980) (band member, lead vocals)
- 90125 (1983) (producer)
- Big Generator (1987) (co-producer)
- Fly from Here (2011) (producer)
- Fly from Here – Return Trip (2018) (lead vocals, producer, mixer)
- From a Page (Expanded and Remastered Edition) (2026) (additional backing vocals)

== Production ==
=== 1970s ===
- John Howard – "I Can Breathe Again" (single, 1978)
- John Howard – "Don't Shine Your Light" (single, 1979)
- Lips – "Say Hello To My Girl " (single, 1978)
- Big A – "Caribbean Air Control" (single, 1978)
- Big A – "Fly On UFO" (single, 1978)
- Chromium – Star to Star (1979) (Horn: producer and songwriter, Geoff Downes: keyboards and songwriter, Hans Zimmer: electronics)

=== 1980s ===
- Dollar – The Dollar Album (produced, and played bass guitar on four tracks: "Mirror Mirror", "Give Me Back My Heart", "Videotheque", "Hand Held in Black and White") (1982)
- ABC – The Lexicon of Love (1982)
- Spandau Ballet – "Instinction" (single, 1982) (co-producer)
- Philip Jap – "Save Us" (single, 1982)
- The Korgis – "Don't Look Back" (single, 1982)
- Malcolm McLaren – Duck Rock (1983)
- Philip Jap – "Brain Dance" (single, 1983)
- Frankie Goes to Hollywood – Welcome to the Pleasuredome (1984)
- Band Aid – "Do They Know It's Christmas?" (12" version, 1984)
- Grace Jones – Slave to the Rhythm (1985)
- Propaganda – A Secret Wish (1985)
- Godley & Creme – "Cry" (single, 1985)
- Anne Pigalle – "Why Does It Have to Be This Way?" (single, 1985)
- Nasty Rox Inc. – Escape from New York (single, 1988) (executive producer)
- Act – "Chance" (single, 1988)
- The Mint Juleps – The Power of Six (1988)
- Pet Shop Boys – "Left to My Own Devices" (single, 1988)
- Pet Shop Boys – "It's Alright" (single, 1989)
- Simple Minds – Street Fighting Years (1989)
- Paul McCartney – Flowers in the Dirt ("Rough Ride", "Figure of Eight", "How Many People", "Ou est le Soleil?") (1989)
- Rod Stewart – "Downtown Train" (single, 1989)
- Rod Stewart – "This Old Heart of Mine" (single, 1989) (co-producer)

=== 1990s ===
- Inga Humpe – "Riding into Blue (Cowboy Song)" (single, 1990)
- David Coverdale – "The Last Note of Freedom" (single, 1990)
- Seal – "Crazy" (single, 1990)
- Seal – Seal (1991)
- Lomax – "Waiting in Vain" (single, 1991)
- Rod Stewart – "Rhythm of My Heart" (single, 1991)
- Rod Stewart – "Your Song" (1991) (Two Rooms: Celebrating the Songs of Elton John & Bernie Taupin)
- Marc Almond – Tenement Symphony (1991)
- Terry Reid – The Driver (four tracks) (1991)
- Betsy Cook – "Docklands" (single, 1992)
- Mike Oldfield – Tubular Bells II (1992)
- Tori Amos – "The Happy Worker" (1992) (Toys Soundtrack)
- Barry Manilow – "Could It Be Magic '93 Remix" (single, 1993)
- Rod Stewart – Lead Vocalist (five tracks) (1993)
- The Pretenders – "I'm Not in Love" (single, 1993) (Indecent Proposal Soundtrack)
- Tom Jones – "If I Only Knew" (single, 1994)
- Seal – Seal II (1994)
- Cher – It's a Man's World ("The Sun Ain't Gonna Shine Anymore", "The Gunman", "Shape of Things to Come") (1995)
- Rod Stewart – A Spanner in the Works (1995)
- The Glam Metal Detectives – "Everybody Up!" (single, 1995)
- Pato Banton with Sting – "Spirits in the Material World" (single, 1995) (Ace Ventura: When Nature Calls Soundtrack)
- Shane MacGowan and Sinéad O'Connor – "Haunted" (single, 1995)
- Shane MacGowan and Máire Brennan – "You're the One" (single, 1995)
- Eddi Reader – "Nobody Lives Without Love" (single, 1995)
- Wendy & Lisa – "This Is the Life" (single, 1995)
- Tina Turner – Wildest Dreams ("Whatever You Want", "Missing You", "On Silent Wings", "Thief of Hearts", "In Your Wildest Dreams", "All Kinds of People", "Dancing in My Dreams") (1996)
- Gabrielle – "Forget About the World" (additional production and remix) (single, 1996)
- The Frames – Fitzcarraldo (four tracks) (1996)
- Bryan Ferry – "Dance with Life (The Brilliant Light)" (single, 1996) (Phenomenon Soundtrack)
- Boyzone – "A Different Beat" (additional production and remix) (single, 1996)
- The Pretenders – G.I. Jane Soundtrack ("Goodbye", "Homecoming") (1997)
- Public Demand – "Invisible" (single, 1997)
- Richard Marx & Donna Lewis – "At the Beginning" (single, 1997) (Anastasia Soundtrack)
- Gary Barlow – Open Road ("Hang on in There Baby") (1997)
- Malcolm McLaren presents Rakim – "Buffalo Gals Back to Skool" (single, 1998)
- Seal – Human Being (1998)
- Lee Griffiths – "Feeling the Strain" (single, 1999)
- David's Daughters – "Dreaming of Loving You" (single, 1999)
- Charlotte Church – "Just Wave Hello" (single, 1999)
- The Frames – Dance the Devil ("Pavement Tune", "God Bless Mom") (1999)
- Genesis – "The Carpet Crawlers" (single, 1999)

=== 2000s ===
- Eros Ramazzotti – Stilelibero (three tracks) (2000)
- LeAnn Rimes – Coyote Ugly Soundtrack (four tracks) (2000)
- LeAnn Rimes – "Can't Fight the Moonlight" (single, 2000)
- Kelly Levesque – "Some Hearts" (single, 2001) (America's Sweethearts Soundtrack)
- Faith Hill – "There You'll Be" (single, 2001) (Pearl Harbor Soundtrack)
- Truth Hurts – "For Your Precious Love"; David Elliot – "Bring It On Home to Me": Ali Soundtrack (2001)
- t.A.T.u. – 200 km/h in the Wrong Lane ("All the Things She Said", "Not Gonna Get Us", "Clowns (Can You See Me Now?)") (2002)
- Yolanda Adams – "If We Could Remember" (2002) (The Sum of All Fears Soundtrack)
- Bryan Adams and Hans Zimmer – Spirit: Stallion of the Cimarron, (co-writer, "Sound the Bugle") (2002)
- Seal – Seal IV (2003)
- Lovefield – Vivid ("Vivid", "Beast", "King of the Universe") (2003)
- Texas – Careful What You Wish For ("Telephone X") (2003)
- Belle and Sebastian – Dear Catastrophe Waitress (2003)
- Various artists – Mona Lisa Smile Soundtrack (2003)
- Lisa Stansfield – The Moment (2004)
- Moya Brennan – "Tell Me Now (What You See)" (King Arthur Soundtrack) (2004) (co-producer)
- G4 – G4 (two tracks) (2005)
- t.A.T.u. – Dangerous and Moving ("Craving (I Only Want What I Can't Have)") (2005)
- Delays – "Valentine" (vocal overdub and additional arrangement) (single, 2006)
- Captain – This Is Hazelville (2006)
- Pet Shop Boys – Fundamental (2006)
- Pet Shop Boys – Concrete (2006)
- David Jordan – Set the Mood (six tracks) (2007)
- Danny Elfman – Wanted: Original Motion Picture Soundtrack (co-producer, "The Little Things") (2008)
- John Legend – "If You're Out There" (digital single, 2008)
- John Legend – Evolver (co-producer, two tracks) (2008)
- Various artists – Israel – Home of Hope (adapting and arranging three tracks) (2008)
- Escala – Escala (2009)
- Kid Harpoon – Once (2009)
- Robbie Williams – Reality Killed the Video Star (2009)
- Aviv Geffen – Aviv Geffen (six tracks) (2009)

=== 2010s ===
- Siphiwo – Hope ("Hope", "The Drinking Song", "Ave Maria", "(Something Inside) So Strong", "You'll Never Walk Alone") (2010)
- Rod Stewart – Once in a Blue Moon: The Lost Album (2010)
- The Squad – "Three Lions 2010" (single, 2010)
- Robbie Williams & Gary Barlow – "Shame" (single, 2010)
- Olly Murs – Olly Murs ("A Million More Years") (2010)
- Jeff Beck – Emotion & Commotion (2010) (executive producer)
- Ou Est le Swimming Pool – The Golden Year ("These New Knights") (2010) (executive producer)
- Blackfield – Welcome to My DNA ("Oxygen") (2011)
- Seal – Soul 2 (2011)
- Estelle – All of Me (vocal producer, "Wonderful Life") (2012)
- Donna Lewis – "Always It's You" (charity single, 2012)
- Dog Is Dead – All Our Favorite Stories ("Heal it") (2012)
- Producers: Made in Basing Street (2012)
- Spector – Enjoy It While It Lasts ("Friday Night, Don't Ever Let It End", "Celestine") (2012)
- The Overtones – Higher (five tracks) (2012)
- Johnny Borrell – Borrell 1 (2013)
- Renato Zero – Amo – Capitolo I (four tracks); Amo – Capitolo II (one track) (2013)
- Billy Idol – Kings & Queens of the Underground (2014)
- Spandau Ballet – The Story: The Very Best of Spandau Ballet ("This Is the Love", "Steal", "Soul Boy") (2014)
- Seal – 7 (2015)
- Artists for Grenfell – "Bridge Over Troubled Water" (charity single, 2017)
- Renato Zero – Zero Il Folle (2019)
- Rod Stewart with the Royal Philharmonic Orchestra – You're in My Heart (2019)

=== 2020s ===
- Blackfield – For the Music ("It's So Hard") (2020)
- Clannad – In a Lifetime ("A Celtic Dream", "Who Knows (Where the Time Goes)" (2020)

== Other work ==
- Boogatti – "Come Back Marianne" (B-side "Boot Boot Woman" written by Horn) (single, 1977)
- original score for Toys, with Hans Zimmer (1992)
- original score for Take Me Home Tonight (2011)
- Legacy – 3 Chord Trick (bass) (2017)

== Samples ==
- The Prodigy – "Firestarter" (1996) sampled Art of Noise's "Close (to the Edit)"
- Dua Lipa: Club Future Nostalgia (2020) sampled Art of Noise's "Moments in Love"
