= Dollar discography =

- Studio albums: 3
- Compilation albums: 10
- Singles: 20
- Box sets: 1

This is the discography of the British pop vocal duo Dollar.

== Albums ==
=== Studio albums ===
Title	Album details	Peak chart positions	Certifications
Title	Album details	UK	Certifications
Shooting Stars	Released: August 1979; Label: Carrere; Formats: LP, MC	36	
The Paris Collection	Released: 5 December 1980; Label: WEA; Formats: LP	—	
The Dollar Album	Released: 22 October 1982; Label: WEA; Formats: LP, MC	18	UK: Silver
"—" denotes releases that did not chart or were not released in that territory.

=== Compilation albums ===
Title	Album details	Peak chart positions	Certifications
Title	Album details	UK	Certifications
The Brightest Dollar	Released: 27 March 1982; Label: WEA; Formats: LP; Japan-only release	—	
The Very Best of Dollar	Released: April 1982; Label: Carrere; Formats: LP, MC; Reissue of Shooting Stars with the addition of "I Wanna Hold Your Hand"	31	UK: Silver
The Collection	Released: 1992; Label: Castle Communications; Formats: CD	—	
Dollar	Released: January 1997; Label: Hallmark; Formats: CD, MC; Contains re-recordings	—	
The Best of Dollar – New Recordings of Their Greatest Hits... And More...	Released: 1997; Label: K-tel; Formats: CD	—	
Shooting Star – The Dollar Collection	Released: November 1999; Label: Crimson; Formats: CD	—	
Shooting Stars – The Dollar Collection	Released: February 2002; Label: Castle Music/Sanctuary; Formats: CD	—	
The Platinum Collection	Released: 24 July 2006; Label: Rhino; Formats: CD	—	
Mirror Mirror	Released: December 2006; Label: Dynamic; Formats: CD	—	
Greatest Hits	Released: 29 November 2019; Label: Cherry Pop; Formats: 2xCD, digital download	—	
"—" denotes releases that did not chart or were not released in that territory.

=== Box sets ===
Title	Album details
Ultimate Dollar	Released: 29 November 2019; Label: Cherry Pop; Formats: 6xCD+DVD

== Singles ==
Title	Year	Peak chart positions									Certifications	Album
Title	Year	UK	AUS	DEN	GER	IRE	NL	SWE	SWI	US	Certifications	Album
"Shooting Star"	1978	14	23	—	35	22	50	18	—	74	UK: Silver	Shooting Stars
"Who Were You With in the Moonlight"	1979	14	39	—	—	17	—	—	—	—		Shooting Stars
"Love's Gotta Hold on Me"	1979	4	—	—	—	12	—	—	—	—	UK: Silver	Shooting Stars
"I Wanna Hold Your Hand"	1979	9	75	—	—	11	—	—	—	—		Non-album single (Note: "I Wanna Hold Your Hand" was later included on The Very Best of Dollar)
"Love Street"	1980	—	—	—	—	—	—	—	—	—		Shooting Stars
"The Girls Are Out to Get Ya"	1980	—	—	—	—	—	—	—	—	—		The Paris Collection
"Takin' a Chance on You"	1980	62	—	—	—	—	—	—	—	—		The Paris Collection
"You Take My Breath Away"	1981	—	—	—	—	—	—	—	—	—		The Paris Collection
"Hand Held in Black and White"	1981	19	—	—	—	18	—	—	—	—		The Dollar Album
"Mirror Mirror (Mon Amour)"	1981	4	97	5	—	5	—	—	—	—	UK: Silver	The Dollar Album
"Ring Ring"	1982	61	—	—	—	—	—	—	—	—		The Very Best of Dollar
"Tokyo" (Japan-only release)	1982	—	—	—	—	—	—	—	—	—		The Brightest Dollar
"Give Me Back My Heart"	1982	4	—	7	—	8	—	14	—	—	UK: Silver	The Dollar Album
"Videotheque"	1982	17	—	—	—	17	—	—	—	—		The Dollar Album
"Give Me Some Kinda Magic"	1982	34	—	13	—	12	—	—	—	—		The Dollar Album
"Two Hearts" (Japan-only release)	1982	—	—	—	—	—	—	—	—	—		Non-album singles
"We Walked in Love"	1986	61	—	—	—	—	—	—	—	—		Non-album singles
"Haven't We Said Goodbye Before"	1986	102	—	—	—	—	—	—	—	—		Non-album singles
"O L'amour"	1987	7	—	—	27	4	—	—	10	—		Non-album singles
"It's Nature's Way (No Problem)"	1988	58	—	—	46	—	—	—	—	—		Non-album singles
"—" denotes releases that did not chart or were not released in that territory.
