= Shooting Stars (album) =

Album by Dollar

Studio album by Dollar
- Released: September 1979
- Recorded: 1978–1979
- Genre: Pop, MOR
- Length: 33:10
- Label: Carrere Records
- Producer: Christopher Neil

Dollar chronology
Shooting Stars (1979)	The Paris Collection (1980)

Professional ratings
Review scores
Source	Rating
Smash Hits	6/10
Chart Songwords	3/5 stars

Shooting Stars is the debut album by the British pop duo Dollar.

Released in 1979, the album contained the duo's first three singles; "Shooting Star", "Who Were You With in the Moonlight" and "Love's Gotta Hold on Me". The album was released on Carrere Records and reached no.36 in the UK Albums Chart. Five of the nine tracks were written by Dollar members David Van Day and Thereza Bazar, the album was produced by Christopher Neil.

Track "Love Street" was released as a single after the group had left the label. "I Need Your Love" was released as a single in Brazil in 1980, while "Tokyo" became a single in Japan in 1982. The album was released on CD for the first time in 2019 as part of a Dollar box-set by Cherry Red Records. At the same time it was re-issued as a gold-coloured vinyl album with "I Wanna Hold Your Hand" added.

The album was never released in the United States.

== Track listing ==
Side one

1. "Overture" (Bazar / Van Day) – 2:21
2. "Shooting Star" (David Courtney) – 3:48
3. "Tokyo" (Bazar / Van Day) – 3:44
4. "Star Control" (Bazar / Van Day) – 6:08

Side two

1. "Who Were You With in the Moonlight" (Courtney) – 4:02)
2. "I Need Your Love" (Bazar / Van Day) – 3:54
3. "Ring Ring" (Rainbow) – 3:01
4. "Love's Gotta Hold on Me" (Bazar / Van Day) – 3:30
5. "Love Street" (Bugatti / Musker) – 2:42

== The Very Best of Dollar ==
The Very Best of Dollar

Compilation album by Dollar
- Released: 2 April 1982
- Recorded: 1978–1979
- Genre: Pop, MOR
- Length: 36:10
- Label: Carrere Records
- Producer: Christopher Neil

Dollar chronology
The Paris Collection (1980)	The Very Best of Dollar (1982)	The Dollar Album (1982)

Dollar left Carrere Records in early 1980 and signed to WEA Records where they went on to find even greater success. Eager to cash in on this, their original label re-released Shooting Stars as The Very Best of Dollar with a new cover and added track - their fourth and final hit with the label, "I Wanna Hold Your Hand". Another single, "Ring Ring" was released to coincide with the album, which clashed with Dollar's latest official single, "Give Me Back My Heart". The album actually improved on its original chart performance, reaching no. 31, which was surprising considering that it featured none of Dollar's recent hits and received no promotion from the duo themselves. The album was certified Silver by the BPI later in the year.

== Track listing ==
Side one

1. "Who Were You With in the Moonlight" (Courtney) – 4:02
2. "I Need Your Love" (Bazar / Van Day) – 3:54
3. "Ring Ring" (Rainbow) – 3:01
4. "Love's Gotta Hold on Me" (Bazar / Van Day) – 3:30
5. "Love Street" (Bugatti / Musker) – 2:42

Side two

1. "Overture" (Bazar / Van Day) – 2:21
2. "Shooting Star" (Courtney) – 3:48
3. "Tokyo" (Bazar / Van Day) – 3:44
4. "Star Control" (Bazar / Van Day) – 6:08
5. "I Wanna Hold Your Hand" (Lennon / McCartney) – 3:00

== Chart performance ==
Release date	Single title	UK Chart position
November 1978	"Shooting Star"	14
March 1979	"Who Were You With in the Moonlight"	14
August 1979	"Love's Gotta Hold on Me"	4
November 1979	"I Want to Hold Your Hand"	9
March 1980	"Love Street"	-
March 1982	"Ring Ring"	61
Release date	Album title	UK Chart position
September 1979	Shooting Stars	36
April 1982	The Very Best of Dollar	31
