= Captain discography =

This is a list of the material released by English indie rock band Captain.

== Demo CDs / Early Tracks ==
- "Build A Life"
- "Western High"
- "East West"
- "Kennedy"
- "Frontline"
- "This Heart Keeps Beating For Me"
- "Glorious"
- "Broke"
- "Earache"
- "Why Wait"
- "Hold Your Fire"
- "Patience"
- "The Egotist"

== Albums ==
=== This Is Hazelville ===
- "This is Hazelville cdr" album (EMI) no cat no
- "This is Hazelville cdr" encoded album (rare)
- "This Is Hazelville Box set album promo" UK CAT NO 00946 363764 2 4
- "This Is Hazelville card sleeve promo" album UK CAT NO 00946 365269 2 8
- "This Is Hazelville Taiwan release cd" With Obi Strip UK CAT NO 0094637085028
- "This Is Hazelville cd uk release (EMI) 00946370 8502
- "This Is Hazelville double gatefold vinyl ltd 2000 (EMI) UK CAT NO 00946 365 2691 1
- "This Is Hazelville double gatefold vinyl TEST PRESSING/ACCITATE (no info)
- "Captain Compilation" BMG Publishing cd given away to 500 at Edinburgh Festival album + 8 instrumentals

=== Distraction ===
- "Distraction" Promo CDR EMI Album (diff running order)
- "Distraction" Promo CDR EMI Album revised track order
- "Distraction" Promo CDR Metropolis mastering Album Sampler
- "Distraction" Promo CDR Metropolis mastering Alternate version
- "Distraction" Promo CDR EMI 207 9982 Album Sampler includes 6 tracks
- "Distraction" Promo CDR Universal Publishing Album Sampler (11 tracks) + 8 instrumental versions

== Singles ==
=== "Frontline At Large" version ===
- "Frontline 2 track promo CD" (At Large) FUGCDDJO11 CAT NO 00946 341830 2 4
- "Frontline white label 7" 1 of 99 made !! (At Large) FUGODJ011
- "Frontline 2 track commercial CD" (At Large) FUGCD011 CAT NO 00946 341832 2 2
- "Frontline 2 Track commercial blue sparkle 7" (At Large) FUGO011 CAT NO 00946 341 8327 7

=== "Broke" ===
- "Broke 1 track cdr" (emi) UK NO CAT
- "Broke 2 track promo CD" inc instrumental CDEMDJ 689 00946 359698 2 5
- "Broke white label 7" 1 of 99 EM689
- "Broke CD wallet" for download
- "Broke CD" 2 track commercial cd including "Why Wait" cdem689 CAT NO 00946 359 759 2 5
- "Broke gatefold vinyl 7" (1)" commercial 7" including "Kennedy" EM 689 CAT NO 00946 359 6987 0
- "Broke vinyl 7" (2)" commercial 7" 2 including "Falling down the stairs EMX689 CAT NO 00946 363 1967 4

=== "Glorious" ===
- "Glorious 1 track cdr" (emi) NO CAT NO
- "Glorious 2 track cdr" (emi) inc album version NO CAT NO
- "Glorious 3 track promo cd" inc instrumental CDEMDJ 700 CAT NO 00946 369 382 2 6
- "Glorious white label 7" CAT NO EM 700
- "Glorious Radio Slave 12" white label 12 EM DJ 700
- "Glorious GOLD box with cd" for downloads NO CAT NO
- "Glorious international 3 track promo cd" with cat code starting DPRO
- "Glorious Download cd" given away with box NO CAT NO
- "Glorious 2 track cd" commercial cd1 includes "Spring Park Hotel" CDEM 700 CAT NO 00946 3700942 0
- "Glorious 4 track maxi cd" commercial cd2 includes "An Evening Light, Radioslave mix and video" CDEMS 700 CAT NO 00946 370 0940 6
- "Glorious gatefold 7" vinyl (1) EM 700 CAT NO 00946 370 094 7 5
- "Glorious 5" VINYL test pressing no info?

=== "Frontline" ===
- "Frontline 2 track promo cd" inc instrumental CDEMDJX 708 CAT NO 00946 376 139 2 4
- "Frontline 3 track promo cd" inc edit (will be rare as not circulated) CDEMDJ 708 CAT NO 00946 375 508 2 3
- "Frontline 7" White Label EM708
- "Frontline DFA 12" white label very rare 12EMDJ 708
- "Frontline Cd:" includes Clear Cut CDEM 708 CAT NO 00946 380 3072 0
- "Frontline gatefold 7inch (1)" includes Evolutions EM 708 CAT NO 00946 375 508 7 8
- "Frontline 7" (2)" includes These Words EMX 708 CAT NO 00946 381 183 7 4
- "Frontline DFA Remix 12" 500 made 12 EM 708

=== "Animal" ===
- "Animal" EMDJ 742 LTD 99 copies of a 1 sided 12" vinyl
- "Animal" EMI CDR

=== "Keep An Open Mind" ===
- "Keep An Open Mind" EMI CDEMDJ746 2 Track Promo CD includes edit and Instrumental
- "Keep An Open Mind" EMI CDEM746 CD includes Keep An Open Mind fade & Bakersfield from the Distraction sessions
- "Keep An Open Mind" EMI EM746 Vinyl 1 Includes Keep An Open Mind Edit & Satellites Ltd gatefold black vinyl
- "Keep An Open Mind" EMI EMX746 Vinyl 2 includes Keep An Open Mind album version & Patience Ltd red vinyl
- "Keep An Open Mind" Alternate Version exclusive version for iTunes
- "Keep An Open Mind" Live Exclusive version for Record Store

Debuted at #53 on the UK Charts. There are 3 different versions of the cover, designed by Bogna Kuczerawy.

=== "Echoes of Fashion" ===
- "Echoes Of Fashion" EMI CDEMDJ 751 2 Track Promo CD includes edit and Instrumental
- "Little Echoes Of Fashion" Rich Haines Dungeon session recording
- "LEOF" Mario's Computer demo version

== Compilations ==
- "In The city 2005 cd"
- "Camden Crawl 2006 cd" (Frontline)
- "Bands 06 cd" (Broke) (emi)
- "Ibiza Rocks 2006 cd" (inc Broke)

== Non album tracks ==
- "Kennedy" Produced by Rob Kirwan (re- recorded bass and drums and mix)
- "Why Wait" Produced by Rob Kirwan b-side "Broke"
- "Falling Down The Stairs" Produced by Rob Kirwan b-side "Broke"
- "Spring Park Hotel" recorded by Tim Weidner b-side "Glorious"
- "An Evening Light" recorded by Tim Weidner b-side "Glorious"
- "Positivity" recorded by Tim Weidner b-side "Glorious"
- "Evolutions" recorded by Captain engineered by Ian b-side "Frontline"
- "Clear Cut" recorded by Captain engineered by Ian b-side "Frontline"
- "These Words" Unfaded version recorded by Captain engineered by Ian b-side "Frontline"
- "Wax Live at Bush Hall" Produced by JJ Stereo mixed by Paddy free Myspace download
- "Accdie Live at Bush Hall" Produced by JJ Stereo mixed by Paddy free Myspace download
- "Frontline" Produced by Rob Kirwan (released on At Large Recordings)
- "This Heart Keeps Beating For Me" Produced by Rob Kirwan (released on At Large Recordings)
- "Broke Demo" Produced by Rob Kirwan iTunes download
- "Broke Instrumental" Produced By Trevor Horn from the Broke Promo CD
- "Glorious Radioslave Remix" remixed by Radioslave (Matt Edwards) b-side Glorious (CD 2)
- "Glorious Cut And Shut version" Produced by Captain iTunes download
- "Glorious live at Bush Hall" Produced by Paul for JJ Stereo iTunes download
- "Glorious Demo" Produced by Rob Kirwan recorded at Rockfield Studios version 2 iTunes download
- "Glorious Edit" Produced By Trevor Horn from the Glorious Promo CD and iTunes
- "Glorious Instrumental" Produced By Trevor Horn from the Glorious Promo CD
- "Frontline DFA Remix" Frontline 12" remixed by the DFA
- "Frontline Demo" Produced by Rob Kirwan iTunes download
- "Frontline Cut And Shut version" Produced by Captain iTunes download
- "Frontline Instrumental" Produced By Trevor Horn from the Frontline Promo CD
- "Bakersfield" Produced By Barny Barnicott from The Keep An Open Mind CD a track not making the second album
- "Satellites" recorded for original release of Keep An Open Mind produced by Ben Hillier (not additional Production from Barny) Keep An Open Mind On vinyl 1
- "Patience" Recorded By Rob Kirwan as an early demo for the band before they signed... never made either album. on Keep An Open Mind On vinyl 2

== Unreleased ==
- "Frontline DFA Remix instrumental" Frontline 12" remixed by the DFA Unreleased
- "Frontline Edit" rare un-issued 3 track promo cd
- "These Words" faded version recorded by Captain engineered by Ian unreleased
- "Glorious" 50 Eddies Remix Unreleased
- "Glorious" 50 Eddies Remix 2 Unreleased
- "Animal" Optimo Remix Unreleased
