= The Paris Collection =

The Paris Collection may refer to:

- The Paris Collection (Dollar album), 1980
- The Paris Collection (Camel album), 2001
