= Reimagines the Eighties =

Studio album by Trevor Horn featuring Sarm Orchestra
- Released: 25 January 2019
- Recorded: 2018
- Length: 52:17
- Label: BMG
- Producer: Trevor Horn

Trevor Horn chronology
The Reflection Wave One (2017)	Reimagines the Eighties (2019)	Echoes: Ancient & Modern (2023)

Trevor Horn Reimagines the Eighties is a studio album by English music producer Trevor Horn, released in 2019. It was recorded over about a year.

== Track listing ==
No.	Title	Originally by	Length
1.	"Everybody Wants To Rule The World" (with Robbie Williams)	Tears for Fears	4:16
2.	"Dancing In The Dark" (with Gabrielle Aplin)	Bruce Springsteen	4:23
3.	"Ashes To Ashes" (with Seal)	David Bowie	4:17
4.	"The Power Of Love" (with Matt Cardle)	Frankie Goes to Hollywood	4:27
5.	"It's Different For Girls" (with Steve Hogarth)	Joe Jackson	4:11
6.	"Slave To The Rhythm" (with Rumer)	Grace Jones	3:14
7.	"Brothers In Arms" (with Simple Minds)	Dire Straits	4:54
8.	"Girls On Film" (with All Saints)	Duran Duran	3:34
9.	"What's Love Got To Do With It" (with Tony Hadley)	Tina Turner	3:32
10.	"Owner Of A Lonely Heart"	Yes	5:48
11.	"Take On Me"	A-ha	4:36
12.	"Blue Monday" (with Rev Jimmie Wood)	New Order	5:05

Japanese bonus track
No.	Title	Originally by	Length
13.	"Cry" (with Jamie Squire)	Godley & Creme

== Personnel ==
- Robbie Williams – vocals (1)
- Gabrielle Aplin – vocals (2)
- Seal – vocals (3)
- Matt Cardle – vocals (4)
- Steve Hogarth – vocals (5)
- Rumer – vocals (6)
- Jim Kerr – vocals (7)
- All Saints – vocals (8)
- Tony Hadley – vocals (9)
- Trevor Horn – vocals (10, 11)
- Jimmie Wood – vocals (12)
- Lol Creme – backing vocals (1)
- Izzy Chase – backing vocals
- Katie Holmes-Smith – backing vocals

== Chart positions ==
Chart performance for Reimagines the Eighties
Chart (2019)	Peak position
Scottish Albums (OCC)	8
UK Albums (OCC)	11
UK Album Downloads (OCC)	5
UK Independent Albums (OCC)	1
