= This Is Hazelville =

Studio album by Captain
- Released: August 14, 2006
- Recorded: 2006
- Label: EMI
- Producer: Trevor Horn

Professional ratings
Review scores
Source	Rating
Click Music	link
Drowned in Sound	link
The Guardian	11 August 2006
Music OMH	link
NME	link
Stylus Magazine	B link
The Beat Surrender	link
Time Out	link

This Is Hazelville is the debut album of the English rock group Captain, produced by Trevor Horn.

== Track listing ==
All songs written by Captain

1. Hazelville (5:04)
2. Glorious (4:30)
3. Broke (3:37)
4. East. West. North. South (3:50)
5. Frontline (3:59)
6. Build a Life (3:46)
7. Wax (4:10)
8. This Heart Keeps Beating for Me (2:58)
9. Western High (4:42)
10. Summer Rain (3:43)
11. Accidie (5:17)

== Personnel ==
=== Captain ===
- Rik Flynn — lead vocals, guitars, 12-string guitars, mandolin, keyboards
- Clare Szembek — vocals, piano, keyboards, marimba, xylophone, percussion, vibraphone, glockenspiel
- Reuben Humphries — drums, percussion, vocals, keyboards, xylophone
- Mario Athanasiou — guitars
- Alex Yeoman — bass, double bass, keyboards

=== Additional musicians ===
- Steve Sidwell — trumpet, flugelhorn
- Taz Mattar — programming, keyboards
