= Love's Gotta Hold on Me =

Single by Dollar

from the album Shooting Stars
- Released: 27 July 1979
- Genre: Pop
- Length: 3:33
- Label: Carrere Records
- Songwriters: David Van Day, Thereza Bazar
- Producer: Christopher Neil

Dollar singles chronology
"Who Were You With in the Moonlight" (1979)	"Love's Gotta Hold on Me" (1979)	"I Want to Hold Your Hand" (1979)

"Love's Gotta Hold on Me" is a 1979 single by the British pop duo Dollar. It was released in July 1979 and became one of the duo's biggest hits, peaking at number four in the UK Singles Charts. The song was written by the duo themselves and produced by Christopher Neil. It was included on their debut album Shooting Stars.

== Overview ==
By the time of this single's release, Dollar had already scored two UK top 20 singles with "Shooting Star" (1978) and "Who Were You With in the Moonlight" (1979). It was with "Love's Gotta Hold on Me" however that Dollar achieved their first top ten placing when it peaked at No.4 in the UK in September 1979. A departure from their first two hits, this song was written by the duo themselves and was a soft-voiced ballad, sung by Thereza Bazar rather than David Van Day to his annoyance who was originally slated to sing lead, but on recording the demo his voice didn't fit the quiet tone of the song and producer Christopher Neil gave it to Bazar instead. Van Day later commented on the situation; "I was supposed to be doing a solo career, and now she's singing the lead and there's hardly any of me on it - and I wrote the bloody thing!" Bazar commented; "He just couldn't sing it". Despite it becoming their biggest hit however the song received negative reviews in the pop press and attracted criticism from Bob Geldof who reviewed the song on an edition of Juke Box Jury, saying that acts like Dollar "constipated" the charts.

Released in July 1979 and peaking inside the top ten in September, "Love's Gotta Hold on Me" remained on the UK top 75 for 13 weeks, being certified silver by the BPI. However, in 1980, the documentary series World in Action ran an edition exposing the chart rigging practices ongoing within the UK singles chart. Of the singles mentioned from the previous 12 months (including some British No.1's), Dollar's "Love's Gotta Hold on Me" was listed as one of the songs rigged to get into the charts. In particular WEA (distributor of Carrere Records) was mentioned as being quite prolific in bribing singles into the charts. Either way, "Love's Gotta Hold on Me" was listed as the 47th best-selling single of 1979. It was also certified silver.

"Love's Gotta Hold on Me" was backed by another Van Day/Bazar composition "Tokyo" as its B-side. This song was also released as a single in Japan the following year. The UK single was released in standard 7-inch vinyl as well as an alternate version on clear vinyl with a picture sleeve. Both tracks were featured on Dollar's debut album Shooting Stars, which was released soon after the single. The album itself peaked at No.36 in the UK albums Chart. Dollar released just one more single with Carrere Records before departing to WEA in 1980. "Love's Gotta Hold on Me" was the first of five top ten hits for the duo, but was the only one they composed.

== Track listing ==
1. "Love's Gotta Hold on Me" (David Van Day / Thereza Bazar) 3.33
2. "Tokyo" (single edit) (Van Day / Bazar) 3.36

== Chart performance ==
Country	Peak position
Ireland	12
UK	4
