= Paul Griggs =

British musician (born 1944)

- Born: 20 November 1944 (age 81); St. Albans, Hertfordshire, England
- Genres: Pop music
- Years active: 1963–present
- Website: paulgriggs.com

Paul Griggs (born 20 November 1944 in St. Albans, Hertfordshire, England) is a British musician. He first played professionally in the band The Cortinas, formed in 1963. The Cortinas released one single in 1968 on Polydor Records called "Phoebe's Flower Shop" and were renamed Octopus the same year.

Octopus, which included Griggs' brother Nigel, supported many well-known groups including Cream and Yes and they released one LP (Restless Night, Penny Farthing, April 1971) and several singles. During its existence, Octopus had several members who later joined famous groups: Drummer Brian Glascock, John Cook and Tim Reeves of Mungo Jerry, and brother Nigel Griggs and Malcolm Green, both later of New Zealand group, Split Enz. According to the Nottingham Post, "There was a point – when Octopus cut a single and album – when it looked like fame would be theirs ... but it didn't happen."

When Octopus disbanded, Griggs joined vocal group Guys 'n' Dolls and their first single "There's a Whole Lot of Loving" reached number two in the UK Singles Chart. Griggs did not feature on this recording. It had been pre-recorded by session musicians. This was followed by other chart placements.

In September 1978, Guys 'n' Dolls supported Frank Sinatra for a week of concerts at the Royal Festival Hall in London and in the same year they took part in the Yamaha Song Festival in Tokyo. Guys 'n' Dolls spent their last years in the Netherlands and during that time Griggs released two solo singles, the first a medley of Shadows instrumentals under the title of "Guitar Collection" for EMI Holland. The second a cover of The Beatles song "You Won't See Me" on the Dureco label. After the group disbanded in 1985 Griggs assumed responsibility for Everyday Music Ltd in England, and concentrated on writing and producing. In 1986 he was a finalist in A Song for Europe with his composition, "I'm Sorry" which was performed by Chad Brown, and a year later his song "No More Tears" was runner-up in "The Buddy Holly Song Contest" that was organised and judged by Paul McCartney. Griggs received his award from McCartney at a dinner in London. Griggs has also released a solo CD on his own Fenman label called My Songs (Fen 001CD), on which he played and composed every track. In 1997, he made a guest appearance on the BBC Two quiz show, Never Mind the Buzzcocks.

Griggs' song "I Don't Wanna Lose You" was recorded by Lonnie Donegan, and featured on Donegan's album Muleskinner Blues.

In 2008, Griggs self-published a memoir, Diary of a Musician (Fenman Paperback) based on the diaries he kept from 1960.

== Discography ==
The Cortinas

- "Phoebe's Flower Shop" / "Too Much in Love" (Polydor, May 1968)

Octopus

- "Laugh at the Poor Man" / "Girlfriend" (Penny Farthing, Nov 1969)
- "The River" / "Thief" (Penny Farthing, May 1970)
- Restless Night (Penny Farthing, April 1971)

Guys 'n' Dolls
