= Reborn in the USA =

- Genre: Reality television, music
- Directed by: Jonathan Bullen
- Presented by: Davina McCall
- Country of origin: United Kingdom
- No. of series: 1
- No. of episodes: 8

Original release
- Network: ITV
- Release: 8 March – 26 April 2003

Reborn in the USA is a British reality television show broadcast on ITV, in which ten British pop acts were transported to the US, where they were supposedly not known in the hope of revitalising their music career.

Each week, the American audience voted for their favourite act. The two acts with the fewest votes would then face the vote from the British public, where the following week the act with the fewest votes was eliminated from the contest and sent back to Britain. The series was presented by Davina McCall and the eventual winner was ex Spandau Ballet lead singer Tony Hadley, who was awarded with the prize of a recording contract.

== Overview ==
The competitors were: Tony Hadley, Michelle Gayle, Gina G, Elkie Brooks, Dollar, Leee John (of Imagination), Haydon Eshun (of Ultimate Kaos), Sonia and Mark Shaw of Then Jerico. Shaw quit the show in the first week after being criticised by other participants for his drunken behaviour prior to the recording of the first concert. Peter Cox (of Go West) was flown in as a replacement.

Further controversy arose in the second week when acts Dollar and Sonia had received the fewest votes and were both up for the public vote. Sonia elected to leave the tour due to stress, but then decided to return to face the vote. Dollar (David Van Day and Thereza Bazar) accused her of pulling a publicity stunt to gain votes, resulting in a heated argument between the two acts, where Sonia ultimately told Van Day he was "a nasty piece of work". In the end, Dollar were voted off and Sonia continued in the show for a few more weeks.

The format for the show had the artists travelling on a tour bus to a new venue each week. Each would perform one song which would relate to the city they were performing in (e.g. the concert in New Orleans would have each perform a well-known song about New Orleans). All songs performed were cover versions, until the final show where the final two (Hadley and Gayle) each sang one of their own hits. Despite his late entry to the show, Peter Cox was the favourite to win, but he finished in third place after forgetting the words to the song he was performing.

The show's theme music was composed and produced by Stuart Hancock for London-based music production company Mcasso Music, and variations of this theme music were used to accompany the on-screen action between song performances.

Following the show's transmission, a book and an album was released. The album contained studio recordings of various cover versions by the acts, comprising 17 songs.

== Live shows ==
=== Results summary ===
Colour key

–	Singer was up for eviction from the tour bus and had to face the weeklong British public vote
–	Singer received the fewest public votes and was immediately eliminated
–	Singer received the most votes from the live American audience

Weekly results per act
Act	Week 1	Week 2	Week 3	Week 4	Week 5	Quarter-Final	Semi-Final	Final
Tony Hadley	Safe	Safe	Bottom Two	Safe	Safe	Safe	Safe	Winner
Michelle Gayle	Safe	Safe	Safe	Safe	Bottom Two	Bottom Two	Safe	Runner-Up
Peter Cox	Safe	Safe	Safe	Safe	Safe	Safe	3rd	Eliminated (semi-final)
Haydon Eshun	Safe	Safe	Safe	Safe	Safe	Bottom Two	Eliminated (quarter-final)	
Leee John	Safe	Safe	Safe	Bottom Two	Bottom Two	Eliminated (week 5)		
Sonia	Bottom Two	Safe	Safe	Bottom Two	Eliminated (week 4)			
Elkie Brooks	Safe	Bottom Two	Bottom Two	Eliminated (week 3)				
Gina G	Safe	Bottom Two	Eliminated (week 2)					
Dollar	Bottom Two	Eliminated (week 1)						
Mark Shaw	Withdrew (week 1)							
Against British public vote	Dollar, Sonia	Elkie Brooks, Gina G	Elkie Brooks, Tony Hadley	Leee John, Sonia	Leee John, Michelle Gayle	Haydon Eshun, Michelle Gayle		

=== Live show details ===
==== Week 1 (8 March 2003) ====
Destination: New Orleans, Louisiana

Performances on the New Orleans show
Artist	Song (Original artist)	Results
Dollar	"They Can't Take That Away from Me" (Ella Fitzgerald)	Eliminated
Elkie Brooks	"Love Letters" (Dick Haymes)	Safe
Gina G	"Fever" (Peggy Lee)	Safe
Haydon Eshun	"Misty Blue" (Dorothy Moore)	Safe
Leee John	"Unforgettable" (Nat King Cole)	Safe
Michelle Gayle	"When I Fall in Love" (Nat King Cole)	Safe
Peter Cox	"The House of the Rising Sun" (The Animals)	Safe
Sonia	"The Greatest Love of All" (Whitney Houston)	Bottom two
Tony Hadley	"To Love Somebody" (Bee Gees)	Safe

==== Week 2 (15 March 2003) ====
Destination: Philadelphia, Pennsylvania

Performances on the Philadelphia show
Artist	Song (Original artist)	Results
Elkie Brooks	"When Will I See You Again" (The Three Degrees)	Bottom two
Gina G	"Don't Leave Me This Way" (Thelma Houston)	Eliminated
Haydon Eshun	"I'll Make Love to You" (Boyz II Men)	Safe
Leee John	"Betcha by Golly, Wow" (The Stylistics)	Safe
Michelle Gayle	"The Whole Town's Laughing at Me" (Teddy Pendergrass)	Safe
Peter Cox	"Me and Mrs. Jones" (Billy Paul)	Safe
Sonia	"In The Midnight Hour" (Wilson Pickett)	Safe
Tony Hadley	"If You Don't Know Me by Now" (Harold Melvin & the Blue Notes)	Safe

==== Week 3 (22 March 2003) ====
Destination: Detroit, Michigan

Performances on the Detroit show
Artist	Song (Original artist)	Results
Elkie Brooks	"You Keep Me Hangin' On" (The Supremes)	Eliminated
Haydon Eshun	"One Day in Your Life" (Michael Jackson)	Safe
Leee John	"What's Going On" (Marvin Gaye)	Safe
Michelle Gayle	"Yester-Me, Yester-You, Yesterday" (Stevie Wonder)	Safe
Peter Cox	"I Heard It Through the Grapevine" (Marvin Gaye)	Safe
Sonia	"You Can't Hurry Love" (The Supremes)	Safe
Tony Hadley	"For Once in My Life" (Stevie Wonder)	Bottom two

==== Week 4 (29 March 2003) ====
Destination: Memphis, Tennessee

Performances on the Memphis show
Artist	Song (Original artist)	Results
Haydon Eshun	"Blue Suede Shoes" (Elvis Presley)	Safe
Leee John	"Return to Sender" (Elvis Presley)	Bottom two
Michelle Gayle	"Love Me Tender" (Elvis Presley)	Safe
Peter Cox	"Always on My Mind" (Willie Nelson)	Safe
Sonia	"Can't Help Falling in Love" (Elvis Presley)	Eliminated
Tony Hadley	"Walking in Memphis" (Marc Cohn)	Safe

==== Week 5 (5 April 2003) ====
Destination: Nashville, Tennessee

Performances on the Nashville show
Artist	Song (Original artist)	Results
Haydon Eshun	"If Tomorrow Never Comes" (Garth Brooks)	Safe
Leee John	"A Little Bit More" (Dr. Hook)	Eliminated
Michelle Gayle	"Breathe" (Faith Hill)	Bottom two
Peter Cox	"You're Still the One" (Shania Twain)	Safe
Tony Hadley	"How Do I Live" (LeAnn Rimes)	Safe

==== Week 6: Quarter-Final (12 April 2003) ====
Destination: Cleveland, Ohio

Performances on the Cleveland quarter-final
Act	First song	Second song	Result
Haydon Eshun	"My Girl" (The Temptations)	"Wonderful Tonight" (Eric Clapton)	Eliminated
Michelle Gayle	"Until You Come Back to Me (That's What I'm Gonna Do)" (Aretha Franklin)	"Ben" (Michael Jackson)	Bottom two
Peter Cox	"Every Breath You Take" (The Police)	"The Tears of a Clown" (Smokey Robinson)	Safe
Tony Hadley	"I Can't Make You Love Me" (Bonnie Raitt)	"Changes" (David Bowie)	Safe

==== Week 7: Semi-Final (19 April 2003) ====
Destination: New York City, New York

Performances on the New York semi-final
Act	First song	Second song	Result
Michelle Gayle	"Fly Me to the Moon" (Frank Sinatra)	"I Say a Little Prayer" (Aretha Franklin)	Safe
Peter Cox	"I Drove All Night" (Cyndi Lauper)	"Don't Know Why" (Norah Jones)	Eliminated
Tony Hadley	"Mack the Knife" (Bobby Darin)	"That's Life" (Frank Sinatra)	Safe

==== Week 8: Final (26 April 2003) ====
Destination: London

Performances on the London final
Act	First song	Second song	Third song	Result
Michelle Gayle	"Sweetness"	"Love Me Tender"	"I Say a Little Prayer"	Runner-Up
Tony Hadley	"Through the Barricades"	"Walking in Memphis"	"That's Life"	Winner

== Album ==
Reborn in the USA – 17 Unforgettable Songs as Performed on the hit ITV Show

1. Tony Hadley – "Walking in Memphis"
2. Peter Cox – "Me and Mrs Jones"
3. Haydon Eshun – "Misty Blue"
4. Michelle Gayle – "Until You Come Back to Me"
5. Elkie Brooks – "Love Letters"
6. Leee John – "Betcha By Golly Wow"
7. Gina G – "I Can't Make You Love Me"
8. Sonia – "Evergreen"
9. Haydon Eshun – "Wonderful Tonight"
10. Tony Hadley – "To Love Somebody"
11. Elkie Brooks – "The Rose"
12. Peter Cox – "Nick of Time"
13. Michelle Gayle – "Love Me Tender"
14. Leee John – "A Little Bit More"
15. Gina G – "Don't Leave Me This Way"
16. Dollar – "Somethin' Stupid"
17. Tony Hadley – "I Can't Make You Love Me"
