= Back of My Hand (The Jags song) =

Single by the Jags

from the album Evening Standards
- A-side: "Back of My Hand"
- B-side: "Double Vision (produced by Simon Humphries)"
- Released: 1979
- Recorded: 1979
- Genre: Power pop
- Length: 3:22
- Label: Island
- Songwriters: Nick Watkinson; John Alder (A-side and B-side)
- Producers: Jon Astley; Phil Chapman (additional production by the Buggles)

The Jags singles chronology
"Back of My Hand" (1979)	"Woman's World" (1980)

"Back of My Hand" is a power pop song by the Jags, written by Nick Watkinson and guitarist John Alder which entered the UK singles chart on 8 September 1979. It had a chart life of 10 weeks and peaked at number 17. In the US, the song peaked at number 84 on the Billboard Hot 100.

There are three distinct versions of the song.

== Version 1 (original single mix) ==
In its original version, the song was produced by Jon Astley and Phil Chapman. This version appears on the initial Jags release, a 4-track 12" EP entitled 4-Track 12" E.P. It was also the original 7" U.K. single mix, before quickly being replaced by the remix below.

== Version 2 (hit single mix) ==
The hit single version uses the same basic recording as version 1, but was remixed by Trevor Horn and Geoff Downes and features additional synths and keyboard parts. This version — which is the charting "hit" version in the U.K. and the U.S. — appeared on all later U.K. single pressings, the U.S. single, and on the U.S. version of the Jags album Evening Standards. Very much sung in Elvis Costello style, it has been described as "simply one of the best records Elvis Costello didn't write", and Jason Ankeny, writing on Allmusic.com, stated that the song was "so reminiscent of Costello's early classics that it veers dangerously close to parody."

== Version 3 (U.K. album version) ==
A third version is a complete re-recording produced by Simon Humphries and The Jags for inclusion on the original U.K. version of Evening Standards. This is also the version that is included on the compilation The Best of The Jags.

== Other versions ==
The song was covered by American musician and actor Drake Bell for his third album Ready, Steady, Go!. Also covered by Alex Orange Drink on his album Future 86 LP.
