= Mirror Mirror (Dollar song) =

Single by Dollar

from the album The Dollar Album
- B-side: "Radio"
- Released: 6 November 1981
- Recorded: 1981
- Genre: Synth-pop; new wave; new pop
- Length: 3:25
- Label: WEA
- Songwriters: Trevor Horn; Bruce Woolley
- Producer: Trevor Horn

Dollar singles chronology
"Hand Held in Black and White" (1981)	"Mirror Mirror" (1981)	"Give Me Back My Heart" (1982)

Music video
- "Mirror Mirror" on YouTube

"Mirror Mirror" (also titled as "Mirror Mirror (Mon Amour)") is a song by the British pop vocal duo Dollar, released on 6 November 1981 by WEA Records as the second single from their third and final studio album, The Dollar Album (1982). The song was co-written by Trevor Horn and Bruce Woolley, and produced by Horn. The song was the follow-up single to "Hand Held in Black and White", which had revived the duo's career in the summer of 1981 when it became their first top 20 hit for a year and a half.

"Mirror Mirror" charted over the Christmas period in 1981 and was the biggest hit of Dollar's career. It reached No. 4 on the UK singles chart and spent a total of 17 weeks there. It also reached No. 5 in Ireland. A music video was made to accompany the song, featuring members David Van Day and Thereza Bazar as wooden dolls coming to life. The B-side of the single was a song written by the duo called "Radio", which had been the opening track on their second studio album The Paris Collection (1980).

== Track listing ==
1. "Mirror Mirror" (Trevor Horn, Bruce Woolley) 3:25
2. "Radio" (Thereza Bazar, David Van Day) 3:45
