= Guys 'n' Dolls =

British pop group

Guys 'n Dolls
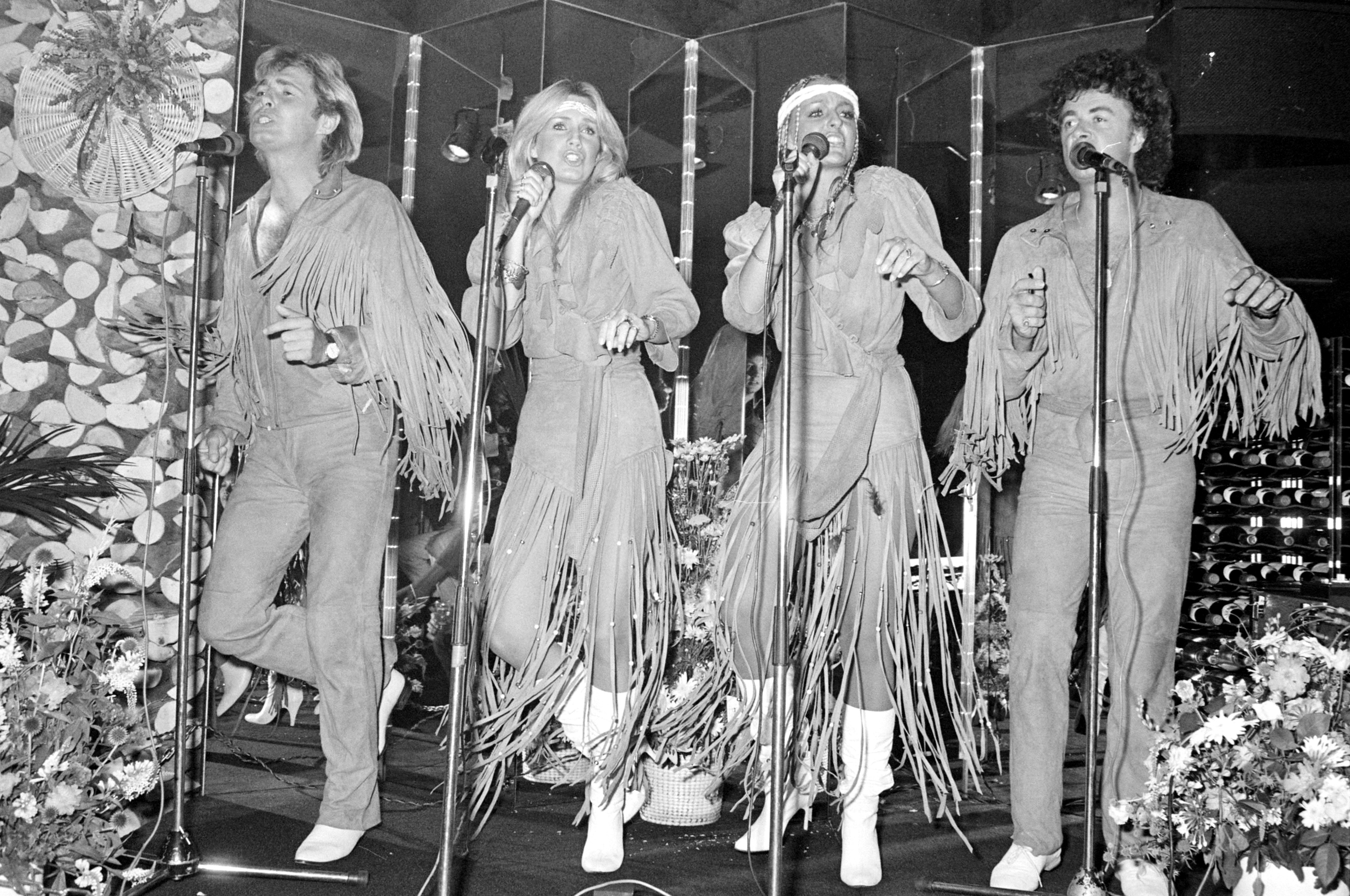
- 1982 club performance in The Netherlands

Background information
- Origin: United Kingdom
- Genres: Pop, MOR
- Instrument(s): Vocals, keyboards
- Years active: 1974–1985
- Labels: Magnet Records
- Past members: Paul Griggs; Dominic Grant; Rosie Hetherington; Martine Howard; Julie Forsyth; David Van Day; Thereza Bazar

Guys 'n' Dolls were a UK pop group, initially comprising a three-girl/three-boy line-up and later becoming two-girl/two-boy. In the mid-1970s, they scored UK top-ten hits with the singles "There's a Whole Lot of Loving" and "You Don't Have to Say You Love Me". In the late 1970s they found further success in the Netherlands, where they had a number-one hit with "You're My World".

== Career ==
Guys 'n' Dolls were formed in November 1974, after Ammo Productions held auditions for three young men and three young women to perform as a vocal group. The six original members were Paul Griggs, David Van Day, Dominic Grant, Thereza Bazar, Martine Howard and Julie Forsyth (daughter of entertainer Bruce Forsyth).

Guys 'n' Dolls released their first hit single, "There's a Whole Lot of Loving", in January 1975. The song was originally recorded in September 1974 by a group of session singers (including Tony Burrows and Clare Torry) for a TV advertisement for McVitie's biscuits. Guys 'n' Dolls were formed to cash in upon the popularity of the jingle and to present it as a single. However, the group was not ready in time to record an entirely new version for the single's hasty release and so the voices of the session singers remained on the single. The song became an immediate hit, rising to No. 2 in the UK singles chart, launching the group to overnight stardom.

The following year, the group scored highly again as their cover of "You Don't Have to Say You Love Me" peaked at No.5. Other singles by the group charted more modestly and they only had one hit album, Guys 'n Dolls, released in 1975. In 1977, however, they scored a No.1 hit in both the Netherlands and Belgium with "You're My World", launching them on a new phase of their career.

By mid-1977, Van Day and Bazar were unhappy with the direction of the group, and their complaints led to the management asking them to leave. By mutual agreement, publicity at the time showed leaving the group was their own decision, to concentrate on songwriting. The duo, as Dollar, had several hits in the late 1970s and 1980s. Guys 'n' Dolls continued as a quartet, with their third album Together (1977) depicting just the four remaining members. The group scored a final minor hit in the UK in 1978, and, after failing to renew their contract with Magnet Records, concentrated on their success in the Netherlands, where they continued having hits for the next few years. In late 1978, the group performed as the opening act for Frank Sinatra in a series of London concerts.

In 1979, the group took part in the A Song For Europe contest, hoping to represent the UK in the Eurovision Song Contest with the song "How Do You Mend a Broken Heart?". The show was abandoned due to a BBC strike, but the song finished in tenth place of the 12 entries when the judges cast votes on the audio recordings of the songs.

In 1980, Forsyth and Grant had their first child together, and Martine Howard and Guys 'n' Dolls' record producer Gerard Stellaard married and moved to the Netherlands. After marrying, Howard left the group, and was replaced by Forsyth's younger sister Laura early in 1981. The change was short-lived, as Laura was replaced by Rosie Hetherington, who had previously been a part of the dance troupe Legs & Co.

Guys 'n' Dolls finished as a unit in December 1985, having spent 11 years together.

Grant and Forsyth performed as the duo Grant & Forsyth, and had another five hits in the Netherlands. In 1988, Forsyth wrote the UK's Eurovision Song Contest entry "Go" performed by Scott Fitzgerald. Both Forsyth and Grant, with ex-Jigsaw member Des Dyer, sang backing vocals for the song's performance at the contest in Dublin, Ireland. The song finished second by a margin of one point behind Celine Dion's song for Switzerland.

The original line-up of Guys 'n' Dolls (Grant, Forsyth, Griggs, Howard, Van Day and Bazar) reunited for the first time in 31 years for a major television show in the Netherlands in March 2008. This included a number of press and TV interviews.

Griggs has published a book called Diary of a Musician, based on diaries he kept from 1960 onwards. It includes a large in-depth section on the story of Guys 'n' Dolls.

Dominic Grant died at his home on 18 November 2020 at the age of 71.

== Discography ==
- Guys 'n' Dolls (1975)
- The Good Times (1976)
- Together (1977)
- Our Songs (1980)
- Happy Together (1982)
