= The Paris Collection (Dollar album) =

Studio album by Dollar
- Released: 5 December 1980
- Recorded: 1980
- Genre: Pop; MOR; New Pop
- Length: 32:41
- Label: WEA
- Producer: Dollar; Greg Walsh; Phil Wainman

Dollar chronology
| Shooting Stars (1979) | The Paris Collection (1980) | The Dollar Album (1982) |

The Paris Collection is the second studio album released by the British pop duo Dollar. It was released in December 1980, their first album on WEA Records.

== Overview ==
Released in late 1980, the album was the first the duo released on the WEA label. Recorded, appropriately enough, in Paris, the album failed to provide Dollar with the same success they had achieved a year previously. Out of the three single releases, only "Takin' a Chance On You" reached the charts, stalling at No.62. The album itself failed to chart. The other singles were "The Girls are Out to Get Ya" and "You Take My Breath Away". In an attempt to promote the album, members David Van Day and Thereza Bazar announced their engagement to the press, when in reality they had split up as a couple months earlier.

The tracks on the album were written by the duo themselves and largely produced by them along with Greg Walsh. Experienced hit producer Phil Wainman produced one song - "The Girls are Out to Get Ya" - which was the lead single from the album, but failed to make an impact.

Dollar went on to achieve their biggest success with the label when they teamed up with producer Trevor Horn in 1981. Tracks from this album were released as B-sides to later hit singles in a further attempt to boost sales of the album. Many of the tracks were released on compact disc on a 2006 compilation album, The Platinum Collection. The whole album was released on compact disc in February 2010 by Cherry Red Records with six bonus tracks. These included two solo singles by Van Day after the group split in 1983, "Young Americans Talking" and "Ringing the Bell", the former a No.43 hit, produced by Andy Hill.

== Track listing ==
All tracks written by David Van Day and Thereza Bazar unless otherwise noted

Side one (The Spring Collection)

1. "Radio" – 3:47
2. "The Girls are Out to Get Ya" – 3:07
3. "Young Love" – 3:10
4. "You Take My Breath Away" – 3:33
5. "Love at First Sight" – 2:48

Side two (The Autumn Collection)

1. "Takin' a Chance on You" – 3:39
2. "Ebony" – 3:09
3. "No Man's Land" – 2:47
4. "Don't Change Your Life" – 2:41
5. "Heartbeat (Love Me Slowly)" – 4:00

Bonus tracks (2010 re-issue)

1. "The Girls Are Out to Get Ya" (Alternate 1980 Mix) – 3:31
2. "Love Don’t Come Easy" (2.30
3. "Young Americans Talking" (7" Version) (David Reilly / Craig Pruess) – 3:33
4. "Fighting for the Country" (Nichola Martin) – 4:23
5. Ringing the Bell" (Jack Hues / Nick Feldman) – 3:43
6. "Young Americans Talking" (12" Version) (Reilly / Pruess) – 6:07

== Personnel ==
- David Van Day – vocals
- Thereza Bazar – vocals
- Billy Lyall – keyboards
- Durbon Laverde – bass Guitar
- Adam Blayzszyk – guitars
- Stuart Elliott – drums
- Joe Hammer – percussion
- Greg Walsh and Dollar – production
- Phil Wainman – production, track 2
- Recorded at Marcus Studios and Marcon Studios, Paris
- Barney Edwards – photography

== Chart performance ==
| Release date | Single title | UK Chart position |
|---|---|---|
| July 1980 | "The Girls are Out to Get Ya" | - |
| October 1980 | "Takin' a Chance on You" | 62 |
| January 1981 | "You Take My Breath Away" | - |
| Release date | Album title | UK Chart position |
| November 1980 | The Paris Collection | - |
