= Echoes: Ancient & Modern =

Studio album by Trevor Horn
- Released: 1 December 2023
- Length: 44:26
- Label: Deutsche Grammophon
- Producer: Trevor Horn

Trevor Horn chronology
Reimagines the Eighties (2019)	Echoes: Ancient & Modern (2023)

Echoes: Ancient & Modern is a covers album by the English music producer Trevor Horn, released on 1 December 2023 through Deutsche Grammophon. Like his previous album Reimagines the Eighties (2019), the songs feature orchestration and are sung by guest vocalists, with the exception of "Avalon", sung by Horn himself. Three of the tracks included—"Owner of a Lonely Heart", "Slave to the Rhythm" and "Relax"—are tracks whose original recordings were produced by Horn.

== Background ==
Horn first mentioned the album in an August 2021 interview, suggesting that it was "eighties chill" compared to his previous album, Reimagines the Eighties (2019).

Horn stated that "finding the right singers was as important as finding the songs, probably more so" and called it an album by himself "as a kind of auteur" that is "the artist commissioning other artists rather than them hiring" him. In regards to recording new versions of tracks he originally produced, Horn commented that as it is "an album under [his] name, there is a certain expectation to do the big hits" and he tried to think of different ways to approach his previous productions. Aside from these, Horn chose to cover "hit singles" that he enjoys.

== Critical reception ==
Professional ratings
Review scores
Source	Rating
The Arts Desk	1/5 stars
I	2/5 stars
Retropop	4/5 stars
The Scotsman	2/5 stars

Retropop commented that it is "all too easy to slip into karaoke territory, but one so masterful as Horn knows how to avoid such pitfalls and, with a stellar ensemble of vocalists at his disposal, shows himself once again to be one of British music's finest". Fiona Shepherd of The Scotsman called Horn's cover of "Avalon" both "tasteful" and "twinkling" but called his version of "Smells Like Teen Spirit" an "overly melodramatic orchestral" rendition and found there to be "odd matches", namely Corr, Astley, Wilcox and Fripp's contributions.

Reviewing the album for The Arts Desk, Thomas H Green felt that the trend of slowing down pop songs into acoustic or orchestral versions "renders sonic perfection as bland, naff slop. Such is the case with Trevor Horn's latest" as beyond Tori Amos's version of "Swimming Pools (Drank)", "things flop about between the dismal, the pointless and the excruciating". I's Ed Power opined that the album "never really justifies its existence", calling Astley's take on "Owner of a Lonely Heart" a "karaoke go" and the following tracks "wildly uneven".

== Track listing ==
Echoes: Ancient & Modern track listing
No.	Title	Writer(s)	Original artist	Length
1.	"Swimming Pools (Drank)" (featuring Tori Amos)	Kendrick Lamar; Nikhil Seetharam; Tyler Williams	Kendrick Lamar	3:56
2.	"Steppin' Out" (featuring Seal)	Joe Jackson	Joe Jackson	4:24
3.	"Owner of a Lonely Heart" (featuring Rick Astley)	Jon Anderson; Trevor Horn; Trevor Rabin; Chris Squire	Yes	3:42
4.	"Slave to the Rhythm" (featuring Lady Blackbird)	Simon Darlow; Horn; Stephen Lipson; Bruce Woolley	Grace Jones	4:17
5.	"Love Is a Battlefield" (featuring Marc Almond)	Michael Chapman; Holly Knight	Pat Benatar	3:31
6.	"Personal Jesus" (featuring Iggy Pop and Phoebe Lunny)	Martin Gore	Depeche Mode	3:26
7.	"Drive" (featuring Steve Hogarth)	Ric Ocasek	The Cars	3:54
8.	"Relax" (featuring Toyah and Robert Fripp)	Peter Gill; Holly Johnson; Mark O'Toole	Frankie Goes to Hollywood	4:06
9.	"White Wedding" (featuring Andrea Corr and Jack Lukeman)	Billy Idol	Billy Idol	4:33
10.	"Smells Like Teen Spirit" (featuring Jack Lukeman)	Kurt Cobain; Dave Grohl; Krist Novoselic	Nirvana	4:33
11.	"Avalon"	Bryan Ferry	Roxy Music	4:04
Total length:				44:26

== Personnel ==
Musicians

- Trevor Horn – keyboards (tracks 1–3, 5, 6, 8–10), guitar (3, 5, 9), background vocals (3, 5, 7–9), bass guitar (4–10), drum programming (4), double bass (7), vocals (11)
- Alan Clark – keyboards (tracks 1–9, 11), piano (2, 7, 8), synthesizer (8)
- Julian Hinton – string arrangement (tracks 1, 4, 5, 7, 9, 10)
- Tashya Lorien – background vocals (track 1)
- Jon Evans – bass guitar (track 1)
- Ash Soan – drums (track 1)
- Tori Amos – piano, vocals (track 1)
- Tim Weidner – programming (tracks 2–9, 11)
- Lol Creme – guitar (tracks 2–4, 6, 8, 9, 11)
- Simon Bloor – guitar (tracks 2, 4, 11), keyboards (2, 9)
- Phil Palmer – guitar (tracks 2, 5–7, 9, 11)
- Earl Harvin – drums (tracks 2, 7, 9, 10)
- Jamie Muhoberac – bass guitar, keyboards (track 2); additional keyboards (9)
- Izzy Chase – background vocals (track 2)
- Steve Sidwell – trumpet (track 2)
- Seal – vocals (track 2)
- Jesper Nielsen – programming (tracks 3, 5, 8, 9)
- Tessa Niles – background vocals (track 3)
- Rick Astley – vocals (track 3)
- Lady Blackbird – vocals (track 4)
- Bryan Chambers – background vocals (track 5)
- Louise Marshall – background vocals (track 5)
- Marc Almond – vocals (track 5)
- Mica Paris – background vocals (track 6)
- Alex Torjussen – drums (track 6)
- Phoebe Lunny – guitar (track 6)
- Alex McArthur – guitar (track 6)
- Jimmy Wood – harmonica (track 6)
- Danny Cummings – percussion (track 6)
- Dave McCracken – programming (track 6)
- Iggy Pop – vocals (track 6)
- Hayley Sanderson – vocals (track 7), background vocals (11)
- Calum Landau – percussion (track 7)
- Steve Hogarth – vocals (track 7)
- Robert Fripp – guitar (track 8)
- Toyah – vocals (track 8)
- Jack Lukeman – vocals (tracks 9, 10)
- Andrea Corr – vocals (track 9)
- Alan Connor – piano (track 10)

Technical

- Trevor Horn – production
- Sidney Claire Meyer – mastering
- Tim Weidner – mixing, engineering
- Jesper Nielsen – engineering, mixing assistance
- George Oulton – engineering (tracks 1, 4, 5, 7, 9, 10)
- Mat Bartram – engineering (tracks 1, 4, 5, 7, 9, 10)
- Mark Hawley – engineering, additional production (track 1)
- Alex McArthur – engineering (track 6)
- Luis Gómez – engineering (track 6)
- Max Bisgrove – engineering (track 6)
- Tashya Lorien – vocal production (track 1)
- Tori Amos – vocal production (track 1)
- Aaron Horn – recording arrangement (track 5)
- Christoph Thiers - immersive mixing, immersive mastering
- Matthias Stalter - immersive mixing, immersive mastering

== Charts ==
Chart performance for Echoes: Ancient & Modern
Chart (2023)	Peak position
Austrian Albums (Ö3 Austria)	68
German Albums (Offizielle Top 100)	47
Scottish Albums (OCC)	27
UK Albums (OCC)	81
