= The Jags =

UK musical group

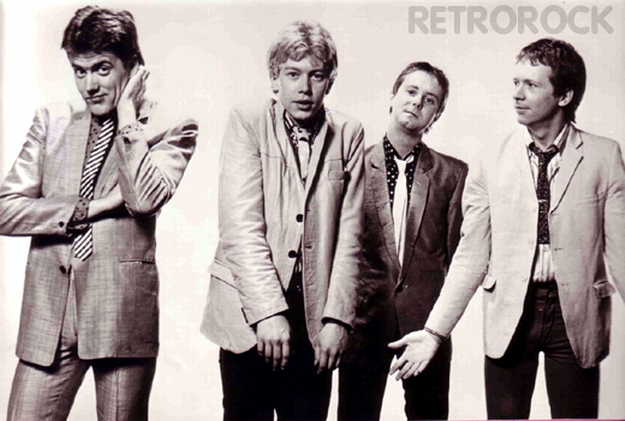

Background information
- Origin: Scarborough, North Yorkshire, England
- Genres: Power pop; new wave
- Years active: 1978–1982
- Label: Island
- Past members: Nicole Watkinson; John Alder; Steve Prudence; Alex Baird; Michael Cotton; Patrick O'Toole; Neil Whittaker; Richard Mazda; Barry Graham

The Jags were a British rock band formed in Scarborough, North Yorkshire, England, in 1978, composed of Nicole Watkinson (vocals), John Alder (guitar/backing vocals), Steve Prudence (bass), firstly Neil Whittaker and then Alex Baird (drums), Michael Cotton (bass/backing vocals) and Patrick O'Toole (piano/keyboard).

A Scarborough-Guildford-Glasgow combo, The Jags marked their signing to Island Records in 1979 with a four-track debut 12” EP ("Back of My Hand" / "Double Visions" / "Single Visions" / "What Can I Do?"). "Back of My Hand" was described as "simply one of the best records Elvis Costello didn't write". The song was included on the band's debut album Evening Standards, which was released the following year.

Starting out in 1978 playing London pubs and college gigs, by 1979 The Jags' sound had moved to jangly power-pop.

== Career ==
They signed to Island Records in July 1978 and initially released a four-track EP.

On 8 September 1979, the power pop single "Back of My Hand", written by Watkinson and guitarist Alder, entered the UK Singles Chart. It had a chart life of 10 weeks and peaked at number 17. "Back of My Hand" was included on their debut album Evening Standards, which was released the following year. Their follow-up single "Woman's World" entered the UK chart on 2 February 1980 at number 75 - dropping out the next week.

1981 saw the release of their second, and what proved to be, final album, No Tie Like a Present. The Jags disbanded in 1982.

== Discography ==
=== Albums ===
- Evening Standards (1980) (US No. 205)
- No Tie Like a Present (1981)

=== Singles ===
- "Back of My Hand" (1979) – UK No. 17, US No. 84
- "Woman's World" (1980) – UK No. 75
- "Party Games" (1980)
- "I Never Was a Beachboy" (1980)
- "Here Comes My Baby" (1981)
- "The Sound of G-O-O-D-B-Y-E" (1981)

Only "Back of My Hand" and "Here Comes My Baby" were released in the US.
