= The Dollar Album =

Studio album by Dollar
- Released: 22 October 1982
- Recorded: 1981–1982
- Studio: RG Jones, London; The Band Stand, Holland; Sarm East, London; Damiens, Paris
- Genre: Pop; synth-pop; new wave
- Length: 46:47
- Label: WEA
- Producer: Trevor Horn; Dollar

Dollar chronology
The Paris Collection (1980)	The Dollar Album (1982)

Singles from The Dollar Album
- 1. "Hand Held in Black and White" Released: August 1981; 2. "Mirror Mirror (Mon Amour)" Released: 6 November 1981; 3. "Give Me Back My Heart" Released: 12 March 1982; 4. "Videotheque" Released: June 1982; 5. "Give Me Some Kinda Magic" Released: September 1982

Professional ratings
Review scores
Source	Rating
AllMusic	4/5 stars

The Dollar Album is the third and final studio album by the British pop vocal duo Dollar, released on 22 October 1982 by WEA Records. The album featured five Top 40 hit singles, including their biggest "Mirror Mirror".

== Background ==
By its release in 1982, Dollar had seen a revival in fortunes following their previous, unsuccessful studio album The Paris Collection (1980). After teaming up with producer Trevor Horn in 1981, the group had enjoyed their biggest success with four hit singles; "Hand Held in Black and White", "Mirror Mirror (Mon Amour)", "Give Me Back My Heart" and "Videotheque" - all of which reached the UK Top 20. Members David Van Day and Thereza Bazar began work on a new album and wrote and produced the remainder of the tracks themselves. Although all their own songs were credited as joint compositions, a number of them were written by only one of them, such as "Dangerous Blondes", "Guessing Games" and "Anyone Who's Anyone" by Bazar and "You Made Me Love You" and "I Got Your Number Wrong" by Van Day.

The production was also largely handled by Bazar herself after she had spent much time working closely with Horn in the studio. A fifth single, "Give Me Some Kinda Magic", was released to coincide with the album. Although it became another Top 40 hit, it failed to chart as highly as the previous four singles. The album, backed by a television advertising campaign, charted at No. 18 (their highest-performing album) and was certified Silver by the BPI. Thereza Bazar has since said of the album that she is proud of their own songs (particularly "Pink and Blue") but regrets that Trevor Horn couldn't have worked on more of it. She says that the four songs he did with them were very expensive due to the vast amount of time spent in the studio on them, but they were "worth every penny".

In early 1983, Dollar were on a promotional tour of Japan with their new single "Two Hearts". The formerly dating couple were by this time finding it difficult to continue working together and decided to split. The single was never released in the UK. Dollar reformed in 1986 and despite four single releases, including a Top 10 hit, the group never released another album.

Many of the tracks on this album were released on compact disc on a 2006 compilation, The Platinum Collection. The whole album was released on compact disc in February 2010 by Cherry Red Records, and included six bonus tracks.

== Track listing ==
Side one

1. "Mirror Mirror (Mon Amour)" (Trevor Horn, Bruce Woolley) – 3:30
2. "Give Me Back My Heart" (Horn, Simon Darlow) – 5:01
3. "Hand Held in Black and White" (Horn, Woolley) – 3:20
4. "Pink and Blue" (David Van Day, Thereza Bazar) – 4:13
5. "I Got Your Number Wrong" (Van Day, Bazar) – 3:49
6. "Guessing Games" (Van Day, Bazar) – 3:42

Side two

7. "Give Me Some Kinda Magic" (Van Day, Bazar) – 3:43
8. "Videotheque" (Horn, Darlow) – 3:34
9. "Dangerous Blondes" (Van Day, Bazar) – 4:13
10. "You Made Me Love You" (Van Day, Bazar) – 4:09
11. "Anyone Who's Anyone" (Van Day, Bazar) – 3:18
12. "Second Time Around" (Van Day, Bazar) – 5:01

Bonus tracks (2010 re-issue)

13. "Hand Held in Black and White" (Alternative Trevor Horn 1981 Mix) – 3:21
14. "Mirror Mirror" (Alternative Trevor Horn 1981 Mix) – 3:52
15. "Give Me Back My Heart" (Alternative Trevor Horn 1982 Mix) – 5:13
16. "Videotheque" (Alternative Trevor Horn 1982 Mix) – 3:33
17. "I Got Your Number Wrong" (Alternative Mix) – 4:24
18. "Guessing Games" (Alternative Mix) – 3:51

== Personnel ==
Credits are adapted from The Dollar Album liner notes.

Musicians

- David Van Day – vocals
- Thereza Bazar – vocals
- Graham Broad – LinnDrum, Simmons kit, percussion
- John Reid – bass guitar
- William C Lyall – piano, keyboards, synthesizers
- Richard Cottle – Prophet-5 synthesizer
- Danny McIntosh Jr. – guitar
- Trevor Horn – bass guitar (1, 2, 3, 8)
- Bruce Woolley – keyboards, synthesizers (1, 2, 3, 8)
- Simon Darlow – keyboards, synthesizers (1, 2, 3, 8)
- Anne Dudley – keyboards, synthesizers (1, 2, 3, 8)
- George McFarlane – bass guitar (9)

Production and artwork

- Thereza Bazar and David Van Day – production on tracks 4, 5, 6, 7, 9, 10, 11, 12
- Trevor Horn – production on tracks 1, 2, 3, 8
- Thereza Bazar, David Van Day, William C. Lyall – arrangements
- Gerry Kitchingham – engineer
- Gary Langan – engineer
- Stefano Massimo – photography
- Nicky Clarke – hair
- Glauca Rossi – make-up
- Bill Smith – design

== Chart performance ==
Release date	Single title	UK Chart position
August 1981	"Hand Held in Black and White"	19
November 1981	"Mirror Mirror (Mon Amor)"	4
March 1982	"Give Me Back My Heart"	4
June 1982	"Videotheque"	17
September 1982	"Give Me Some Kinda Magic"	34

Release date	Album title	UK Chart position
October 1982	The Dollar Album	18
