= The Reflection (TV series) =

Japanese anime television series

- Key Visual
- Genre: Superhero
- Created by: Stan Lee; Hiroshi Nagahama
- Anime television series
- Directed by: Hiroshi Nagahama; Kouichirou Sohtome (Note: Series Director (シリーズディレクター)))
- Written by: Yasuyuki Suzuki
- Music by: Trevor Horn
- Studio: Studio Deen
- Licensed by: Crunchyroll
- Original network: NHK General TV
- Original run: July 22, 2017 – October 7, 2017
- Episodes: 12

The Reflection (Note: Stylized in all caps.) is a Japanese anime television series co-created by writer Stan Lee and director Hiroshi Nagahama. Studio Deen and Lee's Pow! Entertainment are credited with project planning, with animation production by Studio Deen.

The series was directed by Nagahama, with character designs by Yoshihiko Magoshi, scripts by Yasuhiro Suzuki and music by Trevor Horn. 9nine sings the end titles song and also appear as themselves in the show.

The series was broadcast worldwide at the same time, and the 12 episodes aired on TV in Japan from 22 July to 7 October 2017 on NHK General TV. In Europe and the United States, the series was co-produced and streamed by Crunchyroll, with English dubbing previously licensed by FUNimation Entertainment. In other regions, such as Asia, the series was distributed by other platforms. In Japan, the series was distributed on Amazon Prime Video and Video Pass.

A Blu-ray disc was released in 2018.

== Plot ==
Some years previously, a mysterious event called The Reflection gave superpowers to various individuals.

== Characters ==
X-On
Voiced by: Shinichiro Miki (Japanese); Vic Mignogna (English)
X-On has the ability to absorb powers from Reflected, but is not one himself.
I-Guy (Ian Izette)
Voiced by: Satoshi Mikami (Japanese); James Kirby (English)
Izette had a hit with the song "Sky Show" and the Reflection has now given him a superpowered voice that he combines with a supersuit.
Eleanor Evans
Voiced by: Mariya Ise (Japanese); Aviva Pressman (English)
Eleanor is a journalist who can teleport over short distances.
Lisa Livingston
Voiced by: Satomi Hanamura (Japanese); Talya Sindel (English)
A wheelchair-using teenager, Lisa is able to transform into a giant robot powered by her imagination.
Michael Holden
Voiced by: Toshihiko Seki (Japanese); Arthur Romeo (English)
Blinded by the event, able only to see other Reflected.
Vy Le
Voiced by: Ryoka Yuzuki (Japanese); Saki Miata (English)
Michael's wife, transformed into a Darkness Reflected.
Wraith/Ethan Evans
Voiced by: Kōki Miyata (Japanese); Demetrius Conley-Williams (Wraith), Zachary Rice (Ethan) (English)
Leader of the Darkness Reflected. Has the ability to project into Eleanor's mind so only she can see him.
Steel Ruler
Voiced by: Yōko Hikasa (Japanese); Yasmina Shaw (English)
Able to manipulate metal.
Mr. Mystic
Voiced by: Tomomichi Nishimura (Japanese); Stan Lee (English)
The creator appears in his own story as a villain.
Flaming Fury
Voiced by: Yūko Sanpei (Japanese); Laila Berzins (English)
A Darkness Reflected who can manipulate fire.
Volt Vortex
Voiced by: Kensho Ono (Japanese); Michael Orenstein (English)
A Darkness Reflected who can manipulate electricity.
Dead Wing
Voiced by: Shōto Kashii (Japanese); Aron Fromm (English)
A Darkness Reflected who has the appearance and abilities of a bat.
Con Man
Voiced by: (Japanese); Zachary Rice (English)
A Darkness Reflected with the power to cause others to hallucinate.
Thru
Voiced by: (Japanese); Matthew McCallum (English)
A Darkness Reflected with the power to pass herself and others through solid objects.
Deborah
Voiced by: Mika Doi (Japanese); Jill Cott (English)
A government agent investigating the Reflected.
Jim
Voiced by: Ryūsei Nakao (Japanese); Kyle Chapple (English)
A friend of X-On with a scarred face.
Clarence
Voiced by: (Japanese); D.J. Rivers (English)
A military officer investigating the Reflected.
Aaron
Voiced by: Tesshō Genda (Japanese); Michael Orenstein (English)
Ian's long time friend and leader of I-Guy's support crew.
Jay, Tim, and Enrico
Voiced by: Yukito Sōma, Hiroo Sasaki, and Yūta Odagaki (Japanese); Isaac Simons, Aron Fromm, and Matt Murray (English)
I-Guy's support crew.
Ninth Wonder/9nine
Voiced by: Themselves
A quartet of Japanese schoolgirls Reflected.

== Soundtrack ==
A 21-track soundtrack album, The Reflection: Wave One – Original Sound Track, by Trevor Horn was released in Japan, the US and UK. A limited-edition version in Japan adds three bonus tracks. These are also available as the B-side to a digital single, "Sky Show", released in the US and UK.

The end theme, "SunSunSunrise", is sung by 9nine, produced and co-written by Horn, co-composed by Simon Bloor and Cameron Gower Poole, and with lyrics by Kohei Tsunami.
