= Captain (band) =

Alternative rock band from England

- Origin: London, England
- Genres: Alternative rock
- Years active: 2004–present
- Labels: EMI, Gentlemen Recordings
- Members: Rik Flynn; Clare Szembek; Alex Yeoman; Reuben Humphries
- Past members: Mario Athanasiou

Captain are a British alternative rock band from London, England, who formed in 2004. Influenced by groups such as The Smashing Pumpkins, The Beach Boys, My Bloody Valentine and The Cure, their music has also been compared by critics to Prefab Sprout, The Beautiful South and Deacon Blue. The band initially signed a recording contract with At Large Records and released their debut single "Frontline" with that label in December 2005. Soon after, the group signed to EMI Records and achieved minor success in 2006 with their singles "Broke" and "Glorious", which reached numbers 34 and 30 on the UK Singles Chart respectively. Their Trevor Horn produced debut album, This Is Hazelville, was released on 14 August 2006 and reached number 23 on the UK Albums Chart.

On 5 May 2008, Captain released "Keep an Open Mind" as the lead single from their forthcoming second album, Distraction, which had a tentative release date of July 2008. But before it could be released, the band were dropped by EMI (along with many other acts on its roster) as a part of a restructuring plan following the company's purchase by the private equity firm, Terrafirma.

Captain never split up, but chose to work on other projects to keep their enthusiasm for music. Singer/guitarist Rik Flynn and drummer Reuben Humphries formed a new band called More Diamonds, while bassist Alex Yeoman and keyboardist/singer Clare Szembek went on to form the group Misdirectors.

The band have discussed making a new record for some time but never had the opportunity due to many differing work commitments. They planned to release a second album in 2012.

Throughout 2012 and 2013, Captain recorded some tracks at Half-Ton Studios in Cambridge. In March 2014, Captain posted some videos of new songs (including a cover of The Lotus Eaters' "The First Picture of You") on their Facebook page.

Lead guitarist, Mario Athanasiou, died in early 2016.

Captain returned in 2017 with the album, For Irini, and continued to remain active via Facebook.

They released the song "High Beams" on 17 March 2023. An album is to follow.

== Members ==
- Rik Flynn - lead vocals, rhythm guitar
- Clare Szembek - vocals, keyboards, percussion
- Alex Yeoman - bass guitar
- Reuben "Reu" Humphries - drums, piano
- Seb Wesson - lead guitar

=== Former members ===
- Mario Athanasiou - lead guitar

== Discography ==
=== Albums ===
- This Is Hazelville (UK number 23)
- Distraction (no official release, although promo copies do exist)
- For Irini

=== Singles ===
- "Frontline" (released on At Large Records)
- "Broke" (UK number 34)
- "Glorious" (UK number 30)
- "Frontline" (UK number 62)
- "Keep an Open Mind" (UK number 53)
