= Thereza Bazar =

Canadian-born ,English citizen singer

- Born: Theresa Lorraine Bazar; 23 May 1955 (age 71); Toronto, Ontario, Canada
- Origin: Cheltenham, Gloucestershire, England
- Genres: Pop
- Occupations: Singer; songwriter
- Instrument: Vocals
- Years active: 1975–present
- Labels: WEA; Carrere; MCA; London; Cherry Red
- Formerly of: Dollar; Guys 'n' Dolls

Theresa Lorraine Bazar (born 23 May 1955) is a Canadian-born British singer, best known as a member of the pop duo Dollar.

== Career ==
Bazar found success in her late teens as a member of 1970s vocal/dance group Guys 'n' Dolls, who scored a 1975 hit with "There's A Whole Lot of Lovin'". The group went on to have a period of moderate chart success in Britain but were more successful in Belgium and the Netherlands. By 1977, Bazar's then-boyfriend and bandmate David Van Day made it known he felt disillusioned with the group, he and Bazar were subsequently dismissed by the group in 1977.

Van Day and Bazar formed Dollar in 1977. Their hits began with "Shooting Star" in 1978, and the duo went on to achieve ten UK Top 40 hits including "Love's Gotta Hold on Me" (1979), "Mirror Mirror" (1981), "Give Me Back My Heart" (1982), and "Oh L'amour", which hit the UK Top 10 in early 1988. It would be the duo's final hit.

Bazar contributed vocals to the Gary Numan song "Noise, Noise" which was the B-side to his 1982 Top 20 single "Music for Chameleons".

She has occasionally returned to the UK to reform Dollar, for events such as the Prince's Trust's Tribute To Trevor Horn concert at Wembley Arena in November 2004; the Here and Now Tour and the reality television show Reborn in the USA in 2003.

In March 2008, Bazar and Van Day reunited with the other members of Guys 'n' Dolls for several TV appearances in the Netherlands. The original six members also reunited for a concert held in Amsterdam on 17 October.

In April 2008, Bazar and her son, Sam, appeared on the Australian television show My Kid's a Star. In the first episode, Bazar talked about her career.

In August 2008, Bazar took part in a makeover show with Van Day called Pop Goes the Band, which was screened on Living TV in February 2009.

== Solo career ==
The Big Kiss

Studio album by Thereza Bazar
- Released: October 1985
- Recorded: 1985
- Genre: Pop
- Label: MCA
- Producer: Arif Mardin

Professional ratings
Review scores
Source	Rating
NME	November 1985

Bazar released one solo studio album in 1985 called The Big Kiss, which she co-wrote. It was produced by Arif Mardin and featured the singles "The Big Kiss" and "Too Much in Love". The album reportedly cost half a million pounds to produce and generated media attention, but according to Bazar, the album's circulation was poor due to a mix-up at the record company, with the album allegedly unavailable at the time of its advertised release. The title track single peaked at no. 84 in June 1985, but the album and subsequent singles failed to chart. Today, Bazar considers the album's failure as the most upsetting thing of her career, but she has high regard for the album, saying it had "a strong pedigree".

The same year, she recorded the theme song for the US film, Gotcha!. This was released as a single in the US.

In 2012, with Alan Connor, she jointly formed the electro/ Electronic/house band TnA Project. They released a single, "Hold Me on the Dance Floor", in May 2012, with Bazar on lead vocals.

On 20 November 2019, Bazar played a solo live show at 229 The Venue, London; singing songs from Guys 'n' Dolls through to Dollar.

Since 2023 Bazar has performed and recorded with Stephen Fox as Tereza Bazar's Dollar.

== Personal life ==
Bazar lived in Sydney, Australia throughout the 1990s and much of the 2000s before returning to England, although she now resides in Sydney. Australia. She was married during the 1990s, and divorced in the mid-2000s.
