= Dollar (group) =

British musical duo

Background information
- Origin: United Kingdom
- Genre: Pop
- Years active: 1978–1983, 1986–1988 (one-off reunions: 2002–2004, 2008)
- Labels: Carrere; WEA; Arista
- Past members: Thereza Bazar; David Van Day

Dollar were a British pop vocal duo, comprising David Van Day and Anglo-Canadian Thereza Bazar. The duo were successful in the late 1970s and 1980s, achieving ten top 40 singles on the UK singles chart, including the top ten hits "Love's Gotta Hold on Me" (1979), "I Wanna Hold Your Hand" (1979), "Mirror Mirror" (1981), "Give Me Back My Heart" (1982) and "O l'amour" (1987).

== History ==
=== Formation ===
Thereza Bazar and David Van Day met at 17 when they successfully auditioned for the pop act Guys 'n' Dolls. The group enjoyed a number of hit singles in the mid-1970s and during this time Van Day and Bazar became romantically involved. By 1977, the group was in decline and the pair complained about the choice of material and musical direction. Van Day and Bazar were asked to leave the group in July of that year, with them publicly stating they had decided to leave to concentrate on songwriting. Van Day originally planned to go solo, but ultimately they agreed to form a duo. in 1978 they met Chris Youle who had just left RSO records and formed Acrobat records. He wanted to put out a record quickly by them but, as Acrobat did not yet have a distribution deal, he did a deal with French label Carrere Records, to release the single he had made under the name Dollar.

=== 1978–1982 ===
Dollar's first single, "Shooting Star", was released in late 1978 and, after a slow climb, reached number 14 in the UK singles chart. The follow-up, "Who Were You With in the Moonlight?", was released in early 1979 and also reached number 14. After two hit singles featuring Van Day on lead vocals, their third, the ballad "Love's Gotta Hold on Me" was sung by Bazar. It became Dollar's first self-penned hit as it entered the Top 10 and was one of their biggest, climbing to number 4 in the UK chart. Encouraged by this steady run of success, the group released their debut album, Shooting Stars, which made the top 40. In a change of pace, the band released a cover of The Beatles' song "I Want to Hold Your Hand", which reached number 9. At the same time, Dollar had their first (and only) US hit with "Shooting Star", which made it to No. 74 on the Billboard Hot 100.

In 1980, Dollar moved to WEA Records. Buoyed by the success of "Love's Gotta Hold on Me", the pair decided to write and produce all the songs for their second album, released in December 1980. Attempting a move towards a rockier sound, the album, along with its singles, failed to sell well. In October 1980, Van Day and Bazar publicly announced their engagement, coinciding with the release of their new single "Takin' a Chance on You". However, this was later revealed to be a publicity stunt done as an attempt to generate record sales. In reality, they had split up as a couple several months earlier.

In 1981, Bazar approached record producer Trevor Horn, whom she had met during her days in Guys n' Dolls, and asked if he would work with them. He agreed, and produced their 1981 and 1982 material. Horn's production work gave Dollar a more distinctive sound, and their four Horn-produced singles represented the high point in the band's career. It gave them another two Top 10 singles ("Mirror Mirror" and "Give Me Back My Heart") and two more Top 20 hits ("Videotheque" and "Hand Held in Black and White"). All four singles appeared on the duo's third album The Dollar Album, released in October 1982. The production on these four hit singles had brought Horn to the attention of other bands, notably ABC, and it was not long before he was too busy to continue working with the duo. "Give Me Some Kinda Magic", a Top 40 hit Dollar had written and produced themselves was the fifth single taken from their third album, released in September 1982. The Dollar Album was a mixture of Horn's and the duo's own efforts. It became the biggest of their three albums, peaking at No. 18 in the UK and was certified Silver by the BPI.

=== Split and reformation ===
During a promotional trip to Japan in February 1983, relations between the duo had become increasingly tempestuous and Van Day quit the band. Their latest single ("Two Hearts") went unreleased in the UK and Dollar split.

Van Day had ambitions to be a solo artist after he and Bazar split. He released the single "Young Americans Talking", which was written and produced by the people behind Bucks Fizz. Meanwhile, Bazar recorded an album, The Big Kiss, with producer Arif Mardin, and a theme song for the US film Gotcha! with composer Bill Conti. This was released as a single.

Neither member of the duo enjoyed the same kind of success as solo artists as they had had as Dollar, and by 1986, they had reformed and released the singles "We Walked in Love" and "Haven't We Said Goodbye Before". Neither of these met with much success and soon the group were looking for another record contract. In late 1987, the group covered the Hi-NRG-style Erasure song "O l'amour". In early 1988, the song became one of their biggest hits and peaked at No. 7. The group then hit a stumbling block in deciding on a follow-up and past ill-feeling between the pair was rising again. Six months later, they finally released another single, "It's Nature's Way", produced bv Phil Harding and Ian Curnow for PWL. Harding described the recording sessions as strained, with the band feeling intense pressure to make a hit. "They were quite fragile sessions," recalled Harding. "I think they were fairly desperate [for a hit], especially Thereza." The single was to be their last release as it flopped, and work on a possible album had been long delayed. In late 1988, Dollar disbanded again.

Van Day again attempted to launch a solo career, but to no avail. Bazar decided to finish with the music industry and moved to Australia where she concentrated on raising her family. During the 1990s, Van Day teamed up with a succession of female singers for a touring version of Dollar. In the latter half of the decade, he joined a rival variation of the group Bucks Fizz with original member Mike Nolan. Two versions of Bucks Fizz were touring the UK and another Bucks Fizz original member, Bobby G brought a case in the High Court against Van Day. In 2001, a judge refused to grant a court injunction against Van Day as he had been operating in Bucks Fizz for five years at the time, while also running a burger van in Brighton.

=== 2000s ===
In the early 2000s, Van Day persuaded Bazar to rejoin him in Dollar for a reunion tour. In 2002, they took part in the 'Here And Now' tour, a series of arena-sized concerts featuring other singers and bands from the 1980s. They followed this up by appearing on the reality television show Reborn in the USA in 2003. This show involved a number of formerly successful chart acts touring together in America with the public voting off a different act each week. They quickly became the centre of attention when they were involved in an argument with pop star Sonia, which was televised and reported in the newspapers. Dollar were the first act to be voted off and they returned to the UK. Dollar made another live appearance in 2004, in a show celebrating the career of Trevor Horn. It took place at Wembley Arena and Dollar appeared alongside ABC and Pet Shop Boys, amongst other acts who had worked with Horn over the years.

In July 2008, Dollar came together again to take part in a UK reality television programme entitled Pop Goes the Band, in which a number of former pop stars were remodelled and restyled to try to recapture their former glory. The programme aired on Living TV on 23 February 2009. To date, this has been their last activity as an act.

On 15 February 2010, Cherry Red Records re-issued remastered and expanded editions of The Dollar Album and The Paris Collection for the first time on CD. In 2019 Cherry Pop re-released their catalog in a 6-CD/1-DVD box set. The box contains expanded versions of all three of their original studio albums with rare and new-to-CD bonus tracks including demos, single A- and B-sides, backing tracks, outtakes, and 12-inch mixes. A DVD (in Region 2 PAL) has eighteen promo videos and television appearances.

Since 2023 Bazar has performed and recorded with Stephen Fox as Thereza Bazar's Dollar.

== Discography ==
Studio albums

- Shooting Stars (1979)
- The Paris Collection (1980)
- The Dollar Album (1982)
