= Videotheque =

Single by Dollar

from the album The Dollar Album
- B-side: "Living a Life of Dreams"
- Released: June 1982
- Genre: Synth-pop; new pop
- Length: 3:34
- Label: WEA
- Songwriters: Trevor Horn; Simon Darlow
- Producer: Trevor Horn

Dollar singles chronology
| "Give Me Back My Heart" (1982) | "Videotheque" (1982) | "Give Me Some Kinda Magic" (1982) |

Official audio
- "Videotheque" on YouTube

"Videotheque" is a song by the British pop vocal duo Dollar, released in June 1982 by WEA Records as the fourth single from their third and final studio album, The Dollar Album (1982). The song, a synth-pop and new pop record, was written by Simon Darlow and Trevor Horn, the latter producing the track. Upon its release, the song spent 10 weeks on the UK singles chart, peaking at No. 17. It also reached the same chart position on the Irish Singles Chart. A demo version by Horn when he was part of the Buggles, featuring Darlow as keyboardist and guitarist with Horn on vocals, is included on the 2010 reissue of their second and final studio album, Adventures in Modern Recording (1981).

== Charts ==
| Chart (1982) | Peak position |
|---|---|
| UK singles chart | 17 |
| Irish Singles Chart | 17 |
