= Trevor Horn =

English musician and producer (born 1949)

Trevor Horn CBE
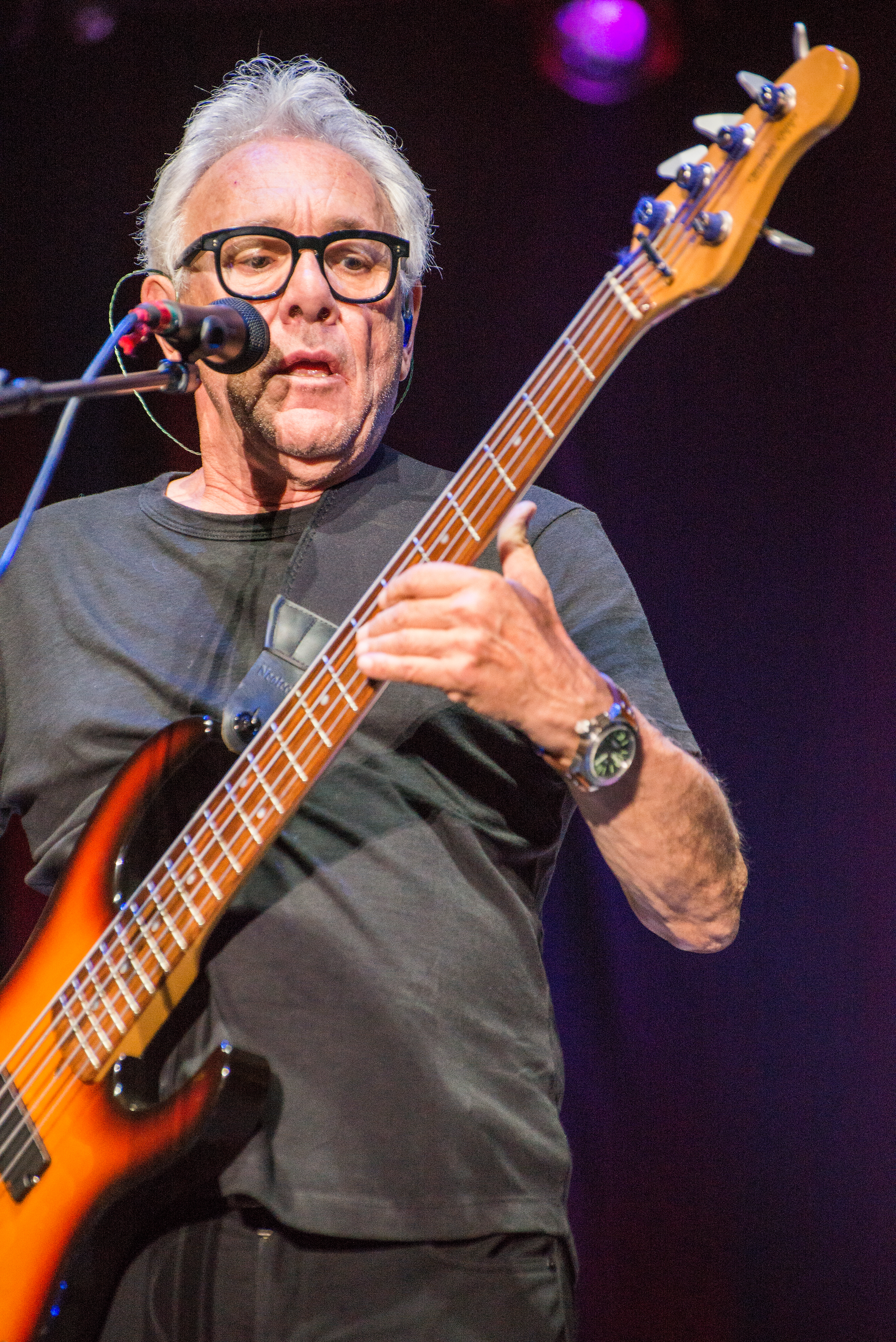
- Horn in 2022

Background information
- Born: Trevor Charles Horn; 15 July 1949 (age 77); Hetton-le-Hole, County Durham, United Kingdom
- Genres: Synth-pop; soul; rock and roll; disco; electronic; new wave; progressive rock
- Occupations: Record producer; musician; songwriter; studio and label owner
- Instruments: Vocals; bass guitar
- Years active: 1963–present
- Labels: ZTT; Deutsche Grammophon
- Member of: The Buggles; The Trevor Horn Band
- Formerly of: Yes; Art of Noise
- Spouse: Jill Sinclair (m. 1980; died 2014)

Trevor Charles Horn (born 15 July 1949) is an English record producer and musician. His influence on pop and electronic music in the 1980s was such that he has been called "the man who invented the eighties".

Horn took up the bass guitar at an early age and taught himself to sight-read music. In the 1970s, he worked as a session musician, built his own studio, and wrote and produced singles for various artists. Horn gained fame in 1979 as a member of the Buggles, who achieved a hit single with "Video Killed the Radio Star". In 1980, he joined the progressive rock band Yes as their lead singer for the Drama album and tour until the band broke up.

In 1981, Horn became a full-time producer, working on successful songs and albums for acts including Dollar, ABC, Malcolm McLaren, Yes (who reformed in 1983), Frankie Goes to Hollywood, Grace Jones, and Pet Shop Boys. In 1983, Horn and his wife, the music executive Jill Sinclair, purchased Sarm West Studios, London, and formed a record label, ZTT Records, with the journalist Paul Morley. Horn also co-formed the electronic group Art of Noise. He produced further hits in the 1990s and 2000s for Seal, LeAnn Rimes, and t.A.T.u., and produced the 1992 Mike Oldfield album Tubular Bells II and the 2003 Belle and Sebastian album Dear Catastrophe Waitress. He has performed with the Trevor Horn Band since 2006.

Horn's awards include Brit Awards for Best British Producer in 1983, 1985, and 1992, a 1995 Grammy Award for Seal's song "Kiss from a Rose", and a 2010 Ivor Novello Award for Outstanding Contribution to British Music.

== Early life ==
Trevor Charles Horn was born on 15 July 1949 to John and Elizabeth Horn in Hetton-le-Hole, County Durham, England, and grew up in Durham City. The second of four children, he has two sisters, including the novelist Marjorie (M.M.) DeLuca, and a brother, the television producer Ken Horn. His father was a maintenance engineer at the neighbouring dairy and a professional musician who played the double bass in the Joe Clarke Big Band during the week. Horn attended Johnston Grammar School in Durham.

At around eight years of age, Horn took up the double bass and was taught the basics by his father, including the concept of playing triads. He taught himself the bass guitar and became confident in sight-reading music, using guide books and practising on his father's four-string guitar in the spare room of the house. In his early teens, Horn filled in for his father on the double bass in the Joe Clarke band when he was late for a gig. At school Horn was given a recorder, which he picked up with little effort as he already had music knowledge, and performed in the local youth orchestra. His interests turned to contemporary rock acts such as the Beatles, the Rolling Stones, and Bob Dylan. At 14, Horn played electric guitar in his first group, the Outer Limits, named after the 1963 television series, playing mainly covers by the Kinks.

Horn pursued a series of jobs, including one at a rubber company. He also put on a Bob Dylan imitation act for two nights a week and played the bass at occasional gigs. At seventeen, Horn decided to pursue a career in music. His parents were reluctant, hoping he would become a chartered accountant as he performed well in maths, but Horn had failed the required exams. His parents pleaded with him to try one more job, but three months into his role as a progress chaser in a plastic bag factory, he was fired. The next day, received an offer to play the bass in a local semi-professional band at a Top Rank Ballroom, playing top 40 and dance music for £24 a week for five nights' work. Horn also received airplay on BBC Radio Leicester, performing self-written songs on a guitar.

== Career ==
=== 1971–1979: Early work ===
At 21, Horn relocated to London and took up work by playing in a band, which involved re-recording top 20 songs for BBC radio owing to the needle time restrictions then in place. This was followed by a one-year tenure with Ray McVay's big band, included performances at the world ballroom dancing championship and the television show Come Dancing. Horn also joined the Canterbury Tales, a group based in Margate, and spent time in Denmark where he ended up broke. His mother sent him money for his return journey. He also worked as a session musician for rock groups and jingles. At 24, Horn began work in Leicester, where he had a nightly gig playing bass at a nightclub and helped construct a recording studio. He produced songs for local artists, including a song for Leicester City F.C.

By 1976, Horn had returned to London. He played bass in Nick North and Northern Lights, a cabaret and covers band, which also featured the keyboardist Geoff Downes and the singer Tina Charles. Horn formed Tracks, a jazz fusion band inspired by Weather Report and Herbie Hancock, with the future Shakatak drummer Roger Odell, before he left to play in Charles's backing band. Also in the band were the keyboardist Geoffrey Downes and the guitarist Bruce Woolley, both of whom Horn later worked with in the band the Buggles. Horn and Charles entered a short relationship, and Horn learned from her inspiring producer Biddu.

In the mid-1970s, Horn worked for a music publisher on Denmark Street, London, producing demos. From 1977 to 1979, Horn worked on various singles as a songwriter, producer, or orchestra director, but without profit. Among his first was "Natural Dance" by Tony Cole and "Don't Come Back" by Fallen Angel and the T.C. Band, featuring Woolley as songwriter, which Horn produced under the name "T.C. Horn". He wrote "Boot Boot Woman", the B-side to the Boogatti single "Come Back Marianne". In 1978, Horn wrote, sang, and produced "Caribbean Air Control" under the pseudonym Big A, which features Horn pictured as a pilot on the front sleeve. In 1979, a full studio album, Star to Star, by Chromium, a "sci-fi disco project", was released. It featured Horn and Downes as songwriters and producers, and Horn's future Art of Noise bandmate Anne Dudley on keyboards. Other artists that Horn worked with included Woolley, John Howard, Dusty Springfield ("Baby Blue"), and the Jags ("Back of My Hand"). Horn achieved his first production hit when "Monkey Chop" by Dan-I reached No. 30 on the UK singles chart in 1979.

=== 1978–1980: The Buggles and "Video Killed the Radio Star" ===
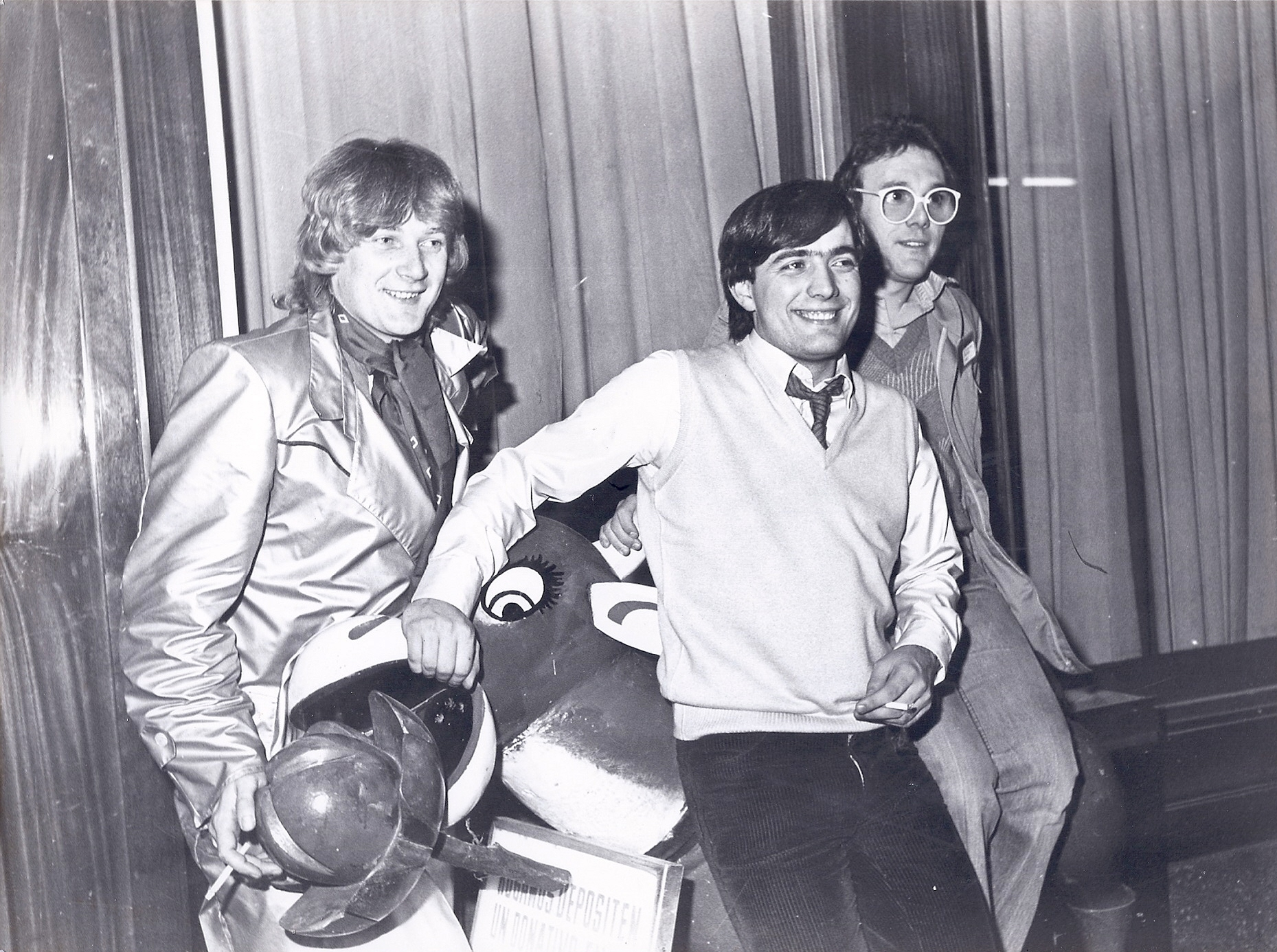
The Buggles: Geoff Downes (far left) and Horn (far right) on the show Caspe Street in 1980

In 1978, Horn and Downes formed the new wave band the Buggles with early contributions from Woolley. They secured a recording deal with Island Records and spent much of 1979 recording their debut album, The Age of Plastic (1980). The credits list Horn with co-production, lead vocals, guitar and bass.

The Buggles' debut single, "Video Killed the Radio Star", was released in September 1979 and reached No. 1 in the UK, propelling Horn, aged 30, to fame. In August 1981, "Video Killed the Radio Star" became the first music video to air on MTV.

=== 1980: Yes ===
The Buggles secured management from Brian Lane, who was also managing the progressive rock band Yes. The Yes singer, Jon Anderson, and the keyboardist, Rick Wakeman, had both departed. Horn and Downes were invited to replace them, and Yes recorded an album, Drama (1980), with Horn on vocals and bass. On tour, Horn was poorly received by fans, and Wakeman would later say "this fat, dumpy guy at the front singing ... it was an absolute nightmare from start to finish". Yes broke up after the tour, with Anderson fronting the band again when they reformed in 1983.

=== 1980–1982: Dollar, ABC and Malcolm McLaren ===
In 1980, Horn married the music executive Jill Sinclair, who became his manager. Sinclair told him that as an artist he would always be "second division", but if he pursued production he would become the best in the world.

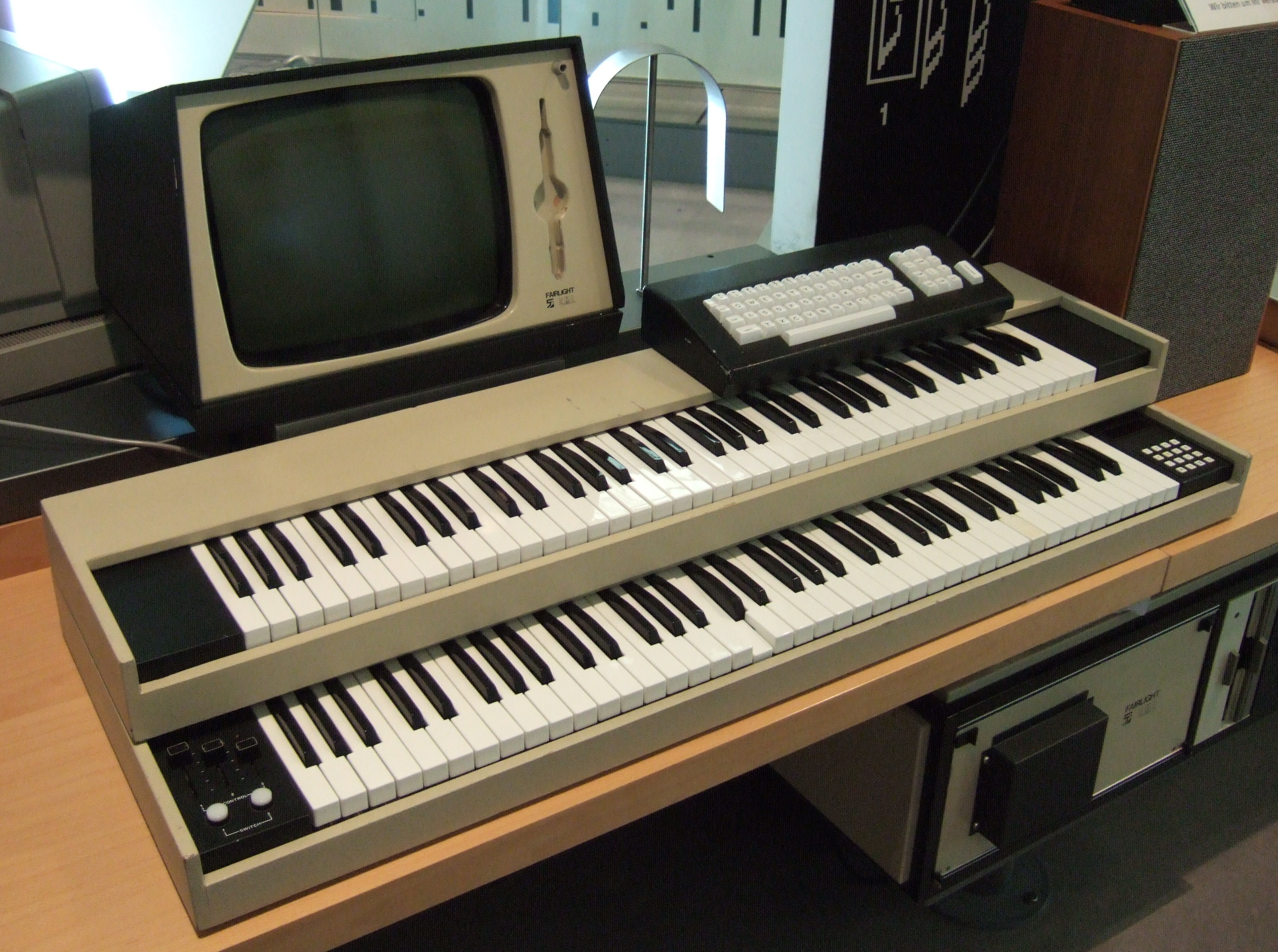
In the 1980s, Horn incorporated samples into pop music using a Fairlight CMI synthesiser.

Horn assembled studio equipment, including a Roland TR-808 drum machine, a sequencer, a Minimoog synthesiser and Simmons electronic drums. He spent £18,000 on a Fairlight CMI, an early digital synthesiser, one of four in the UK at the time. The Fairlight was one of the first digital samplers, allowing musicians to play back samples such as sound effects at different pitches. He said later: "I knew what it was capable of, because I understood what it did. Most other people didn't understand at the time – sampling was like a mystical world." Horn is credited as the "key architect" in incorporating sampling into "the language of pop". His understanding of electronic equipment made him influential on the development of pop music in the following decade.

In 1981, Horn completed a second Buggles album, Adventures in Modern Recording, largely on his own following Downes's decision to form Asia. Horn produced a string of hit singles by the pop duo Dollar, writing the songs "Mirror Mirror", "Hand Held in Black and White", "Give Me Back My Heart" and "Videotheque". All four became top 20 hits in the UK. Though Dollar were a middle-of-the-road band with little credibility, Horn saw an opportunity to combine the electronic music of Kraftwerk and the crooner Vince Hill. The music journalist Alexis Petridis said that The Dollar Album "mapped out ... the sonic future of 80s pop", with "booming drums, high-drama synthesisers and sampled voices". Horn did not complete The Dollar Album, and the production of the remaining tracks was attributed to Dollar themselves.

Horn's success with the Dollar singles generated interest from other acts. He next produced The Lexicon of Love by ABC, working also with Anne Dudley for the string arrangements. ABC's debut became one of the best-selling albums of 1982. During the recording, he persuaded ABC to replace their bassist, feeling he was not up to scratch. Horn regretted the decision, and he later learnt that U2 had declined to work with him as they were concerned he would split the band. Horn won the 1983 Brit Award for British Producer of the Year, thanks to his work on the album.

In 1982, Horn and Sinclair formed a music publishing company, Perfect Songs. In 1983, Horn produced Duck Rock by the former Sex Pistols manager Malcolm McLaren. It featured the single "Buffalo Gals", credited as the first British hip hop single.

=== 1983–1989: ZTT, Frankie Goes to Hollywood and Grace Jones ===
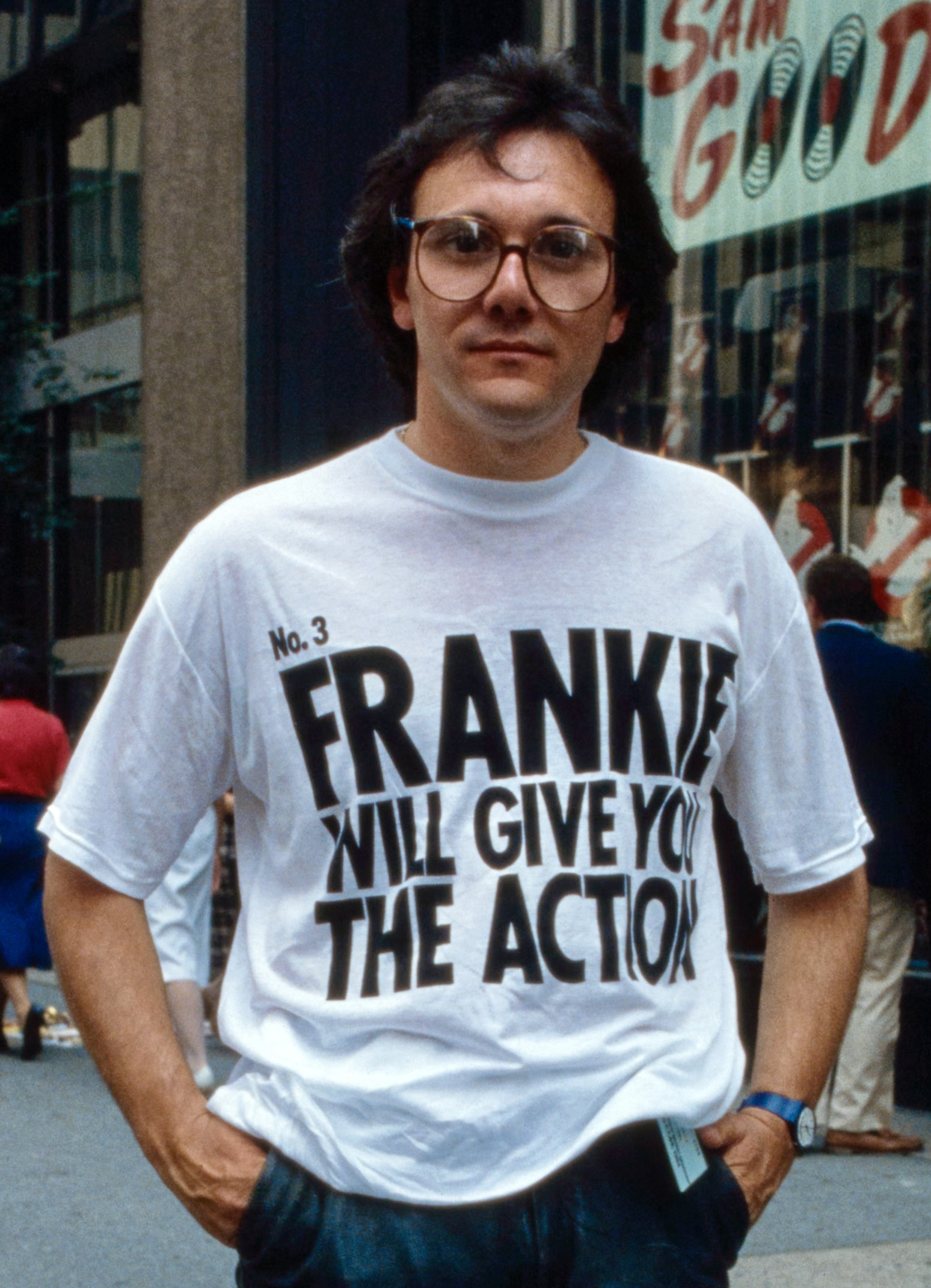
Horn in 1984

In 1983, Horn and Sinclair purchased Basing Street Studios in west London from Chris Blackwell and renamed it Sarm West Studios. With the journalist Paul Morley, they co-founded a record label, ZTT Records. The first act they signed was Frankie Goes to Hollywood. He dramatically restructured the lead single, "Relax", described by Sound on Sound as a "hi-NRG brand of dance-synth-pop" that "broke new sonic ground, while epitomising '80s excess in all its garish, overblown glory". "Relax" reached No. 1 on the UK singles chart. At this point, Horn was working with Foreigner in the US on their album Agent Provocateur (1984). He left the project to work on the follow-up Frankie Goes to Hollywood single "Two Tribes" and their debut album, Welcome to the Pleasuredome, which produced two more hit singles, "The Power of Love" and "Welcome to the Pleasuredome".

Horn worked with Yes again to produce their 1983 album 90125. He persuaded them to record "Owner of a Lonely Heart", which they resisted, deeming it "too poppy". It became their only No. 1 single in the USA. In 1983, Horn co-formed the band the Art of Noise, co-writing hits including "Close (To the Edit)", "Beat Box", "Moments in Love", and "Slave to the Rhythm". "Slave to the Rhythm" was intended as Frankie Goes to Hollywood's second single, but was instead given to Grace Jones. Horn and his studio team reworked it into six separate songs to form Jones's 1985 album Slave to the Rhythm. It features the Pink Floyd guitarist David Gilmour.

In 1984, Horn was asked by Bob Geldof to produce the song "Do They Know It's Christmas?", a charity song to raise money for the 1983–1985 famine in Ethiopia. Horn was receptive but said he would need at least six weeks, which would make it impossible to release by Christmas. However, he allowed the team to use his studios, Sarm West Studios in Notting Hill, London, free for 24 hours on 25 November. Horn later remixed and co-produced the 12" version and remixed it for the 1985 re-release, and again in 2024 for a fortieth anniversary mix.

In the late 1980s, Horn relocated to Bel Air, Los Angeles, where he established Sarm West Coast LA, a residential recording studio. Horn produced another Yes album, Big Generator (1987), and co-produced the Simple Minds album Street Fighting Years (1989) with Stephen Lipson.

=== 1990s: Seal ===
In 1990, Horn produced the debut album by the English singer Seal. This began a multi-album collaboration, which Horn reasoned down to his liking of Seal's voice and a "musical empathy" with how he works and the songs he writes. Seal reached No. 1 in the UK and lead single "Crazy" went to No. 2. The album marked a turning point in Horn's production method, switching typical studio hardware for computers, and he recorded tracks on Seal using MIDI and Opcode Studio Vision software. Horn was pleased with the results and sold his PC equipment for an Apple Macintosh. At this stage of his career, Horn had lost his enthusiasm for producing 12-inch mixes of songs, and he brought in other remixers to make them while concentrating on albums.

He also produced half of the songs on Marc Almond's 1991 album Tenement Symphony, including the three singles on the album: "Jacky", "My Hand Over My Heart" and "The Days of Pearly Spencer", which reached #4 in the UK charts.

In the 1990s, Horn wrote and produced "Riding into Blue (Cowboy Song)", recorded by Inga Humpe, and "Docklands", recorded by Betsy Cook. He also co-wrote two songs with Terry Reid for his 1991 album The Driver, and wrote "The Shape of Things to Come" for the 1995 Cher album It's a Man's World.

Hook End Recording Studios, purchased by Horn in the 1990s

Horn co-produced Mike Oldfield's 1992 album Tubular Bells II alongside Oldfield and Tom Newman. Oldfield was a fan of "Video Killed The Radio Star" and described Horn as like being a judge in a courtroom when presenting some of his ideas for the album, to which Horn would either nod or shake his head. This, according to Oldfield, gave him a kind of a filter for which ideas worked.

Horn collaborated with the composer Hans Zimmer to produce the score for the 1992 film Toys, which included interpretations by Tori Amos, Thomas Dolby, Pat Metheny and Wendy & Lisa. Horn co-wrote "Everybody Up", the theme song to the comedy series The Glam Metal Detectives broadcast on BBC2 in 1995. This was another collaboration with Lol Creme.

In the mid-1990s, Horn and Sinclair bought Hook End Manor in Oxfordshire and renamed its recording facility Sarm Hook End. In 1995, Horn produced "The Carpet Crawlers 1999", a rerecording of "The Carpet Crawlers" by Genesis, which featured vocals from their former singers, Peter Gabriel and Phil Collins. It was released on the compilation Turn It On Again: The Hits (1999). In 1996, Horn produced the multi-platinum album Wildest Dreams by Tina Turner. According to the duo Wendy & Lisa, Horn produced an album for them in the late 1990s that went unreleased. Lisa Coleman said Horn and Sinclair objected to their homosexuality as sinful.

=== 2000s: t.A.T.u., LeAnn Rimes and Belle and Sebastian ===
In the 2000s, Horn was hired by Interscope Records to create English-language versions of songs by the Russian pop duo t.A.T.u. He wrote new lyrics for "All the Things She Said" and "Not Gonna Get Us" and coached t.A.T.u. to sing them in English. He also rerecorded the instruments, as he did not have access to the original multitracks. "All the Things She Said" reached No. 1 on the UK singles chart. In 2020, The Guardian named it Horn's greatest work since the mid-80s.

For the 2000 film Coyote Ugly, Horn produced "Can't Fight the Moonlight" by the American singer LeAnn Rimes. It sold more than two million copies worldwide and reached No. 1 in the UK and Australia. Horn co-wrote "Pass the Flame" (the official torch relay song for the 2004 Olympics in Athens) in collaboration with Lol Creme and co-wrote the title track from Lisa Stansfield's 2004 album The Moment.

Horn co-wrote "Sound the Bugle", performed by Bryan Adams and featured on the Spirit: Stallion of the Cimarron soundtrack and produced 3 tracks (La Sombra del Gigante, Un Angel No Es and Mujer Amiga Mia) of Stilelibero (Freestyle) Estilolibre by Eros Ramazzotti, released on 29 May 2001.

Horn produced the 2003 Belle and Sebastian album Dear Catastrophe Waitress. Horn, known for using electronic equipment to transform music, was seen as a surprising choice for Belle and Sebastian, who were described by the Guardian as "the last living purveyors of arts-and-crafts indie values".

On 11 November 2004, a Prince's Trust charity concert celebrating Horn's 25 years as a record producer took place at Wembley Arena, featuring performances from Horn and many acts he produced. It was released on DVD as Produced By Trevor Horn: A Concert For The Prince's Trust – Live At Wembley Arena London 2004 (2005) and Trevor Horn and Friends: Slaves to the Rhythm (2008), and accompanied by a compilation album, Produced by Trevor Horn (2004).

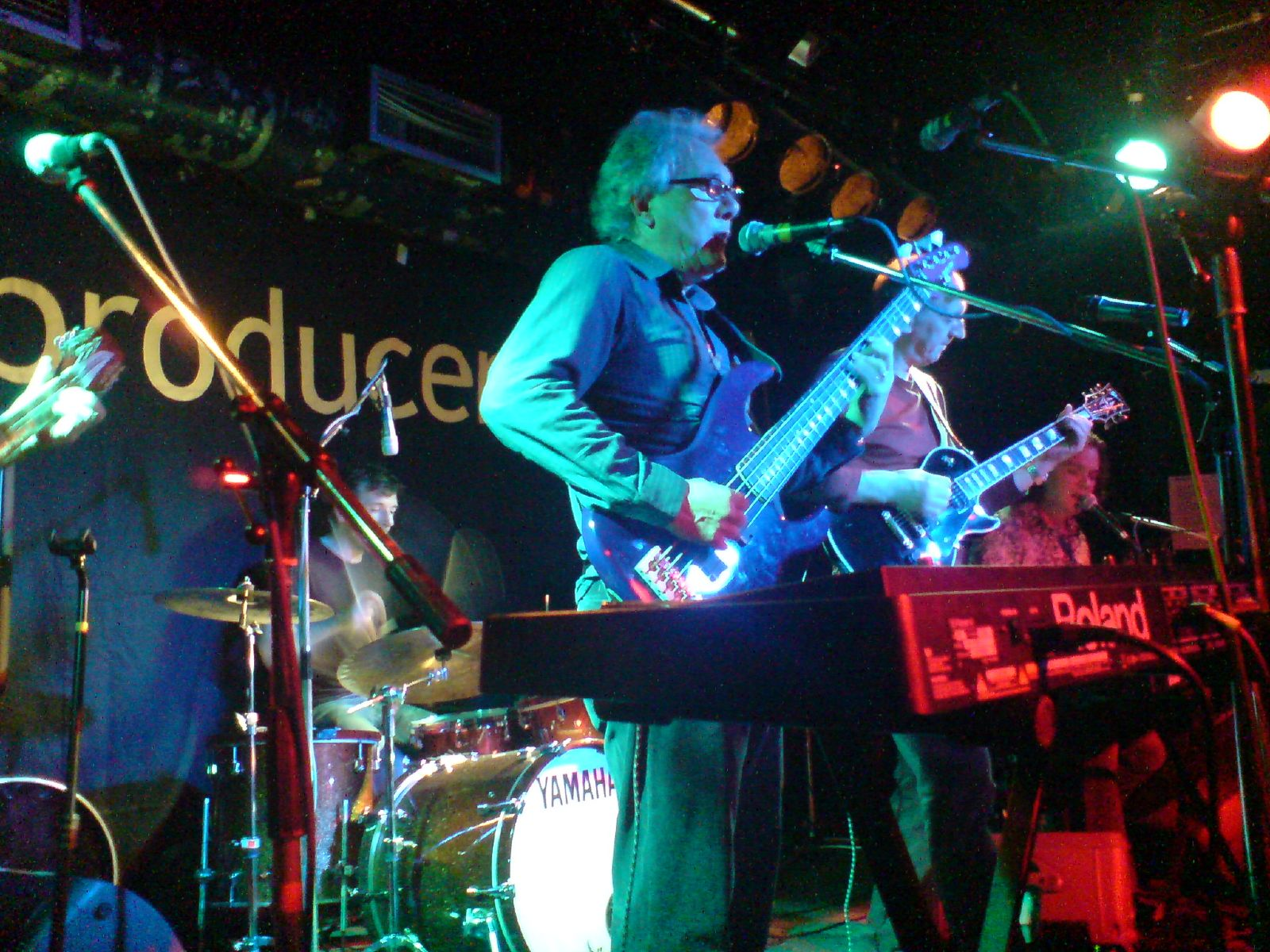
Horn performing with the Producers in 2007

In 2006, Horn co-formed the supergroup the Producers, with the singer Lol Creme, the producer Steve Lipson, the drummer Ash Soan and the singer-songwriter Chris Braide. They performed their first gig at the Camden Barfly in November 2006. They continue to perform under the name the Trevor Horn Band.

Horn produced the ninth album by the synth-pop duo the Pet Shop Boys, Fundamental, released in May 2006. It reached No. 5 in the UK chart. In the same month, he featured in a Pet Shop Boys concert specially recorded for BBC Radio 2. Horn produced an album version of the event, Concrete, released on 23 October 2006. Horn also produced Captain's debut album, This is Hazelville, released in late 2006. In the same year, he also worked with British band Delays on their song "Valentine", which was released as the lead single from their album You See Colours. He has also worked with John Legend and David Jordan.

In 2007, Horn sold his Sarm Hook End residential studio for £12 million and relocated to Primrose Hill, London.

For the 2008 movie Wanted (starring James McAvoy and Angelina Jolie), Horn produced Danny Elfman's vocals on the closing credits song "The Little Things". In 2009, Horn produced Reality Killed the Video Star, the eighth album by Robbie Williams. The album title references the Buggles song and Horn and Williams' mutual disdain for reality television and music contest programmes. It reached No. 2 on the UK Album Chart and was Williams' first studio album not to reach No. 1.

=== 2010s–present ===
Horn was the executive producer of Jeff Beck's 2010 album Emotion & Commotion. He returned to work with Yes again, producing their new album from October 2010. That album, 2011's Fly From Here, is a reunion of sorts for Horn's former bandmate Geoff Downes; not only is Downes a member of the band's current incarnation, but the album also takes its title from a song written by Horn and Downes and performed by Yes during their original stint with the band in 1980.

In 2017, Horn wrote the music for the Stan Lee co-produced anime The Reflection, the soundtrack being released as the first album under Horn's name. Horn remixed 2011's Fly From Here with Yes, adding new vocals and editing parts. The album is called Fly from Here – Return Trip and was released in March 2018. He has also been working on musicals, including one called "The Robot Sings".

In November 2018, Horn performed a one-off concert at the Queen Elizabeth Hall in London. Horn's new album, Trevor Horn Reimagines the Eighties, was released on 25 January 2019. A single, "Everybody Wants to Rule the World", with vocals by Robbie Williams, was released on 24 October 2018. Further guests include Rumer, All Saints, Simple Minds and Gabrielle Aplin. In late 2017, Horn's Sarm West Coast residential studio in Bel Air, Los Angeles, was destroyed in the Skirball Fire. Horn was not present at the time of the fire.

Horn toured as the bass player in Dire Straits Legacy in 2018–2020. In late 2022, he published a memoir, Adventures in Modern Recording: From ABC to ZTT. He joined Seal's 2023 tour, playing bass in Seal's band and reviving the Buggles as an opening act. In December 2023, Horn released Echoes: Ancient and Modern, another album of covers with guest singers.

== Influence ==
Musicians and producers including Gary Barlow, DJ Shadow and Nigel Godrich cite Horn as an influence. Horn became one of the first producers to realize the full potential of then-new electronic instruments like the Fairlight CMI synthesizer and the Roland TR-808 drum machine.

== Personal life ==
Horn met Jill Sinclair, a former mathematics teacher, in 1977. They married in 1980 and became business partners. They had four children: two sons, Aaron and Will, and two daughters, Gabriella and Alexandra, the latter of whom has worked as a trainee solicitor. Aaron (known in the industry as "Aaron Audio"), like his father, is a musician and producer. He was in the band Sam and the Womp and frequently DJs around London (he lives in north London). Both Aaron and Ally Horn are co-directors of Sarm Studios. As of August 2016, Horn has three grandsons. He is not Jewish, but he has attended synagogue with his children, who were raised in his wife's faith. In a 2019 interview, he said that he "believes in [Judaism] more than anything else".

On 25 June 2006, Sinclair's son accidentally shot her with an air gun pellet, which damaged a major artery and caused irreversible brain damage and paralysis. She died of cancer on 22 March 2014, aged 61.

== Discography ==
Solo studio albums

- Made in Basing Street (2012, with Producers)
- The Reflection: Wave One – Original Sound Track (2017)
- Reimagines the Eighties (2019)
- Echoes: Ancient & Modern (2023)

== Awards ==
- BRIT Award 1983 – Best British Producer
- BRIT Award 1985 – Best British Producer
- BRIT Award 1992 – Best British Producer
- Grammy Award 1995 – Record of the Year (as producer of "Kiss from a Rose")
- Horn was appointed Commander of the Order of the British Empire (CBE) in the 2011 New Year Honours for services to the music industry.
- Honorary degree of Doctor of Music (2012) by Southampton Solent University, England.

== Bibliography ==
- Tobler, John (1992). NME Rock 'N' Roll Years (1st ed.). Reed International Books Ltd. ISBN 978-0-600-57602-0.
- Warner, Timothy (2003). Pop Music - Technology and Creativity: Trevor Horn and the Digital Revolution. Routledge. ISBN 978-0-7546-3132-3.
- Welch, Chris (2008). Close to the Edge – The Story of Yes. Omnibus Press. ISBN 978-1-84772-132-7.
- Horn, Trevor (2022). Adventures in Modern Recording: From ABC to ZTT. Nine Eight Books. ISBN 978-1-78870-603-2.
