= Give Me Back My Heart =

Single by Dollar

from the album The Dollar Album
- Released: 12 March 1982
- Genre: Synth-pop; new pop
- Length: 5:01
- Label: WEA
- Songwriters: Simon Darlow; Trevor Horn
- Producer: Trevor Horn

Dollar singles chronology
"Mirror Mirror" (1981)	"Give Me Back My Heart" (1982)	"Videotheque" (1982)

"Give Me Back My Heart" is a song by the British pop duo Dollar, released in March 1982 as the third single from their third album The Dollar Album. The song was their second biggest hit out of the five top twenty hit singles off the album, after "Mirror Mirror". It reached No. 4 in the UK, and No. 8 in Ireland. The song was co-written by Trevor Horn and Simon Darlow, and produced by Horn.

== Cover versions and media appearances ==
A cover version by Robin Wright was released in 1988 on Fantasia Records.

The song was parodied in the 1983 series of Three of a Kind as "Sing a Soppy Song". David Copperfield (as David Van Day) sang the prophetic line "I'll think I'll go and join Bucks Fizz" (to which Tracey Ullman replied "Well, you know where your suitcase is"), which is the group Van Day later joined in 1996.
