= David Van Day =

English singer, songwriter and politician (born 1956)

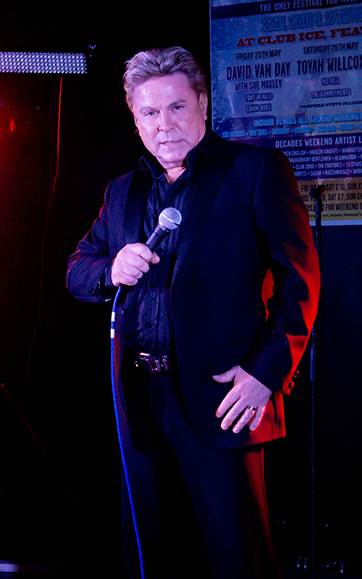
- Van Day performing in 2012

Background information
- Born: David Paul Day; 28 November 1956 (age 69); Brighton, Sussex, England
- Genres: Pop; rock
- Occupations: Singer; songwriter; politician
- Instrument: Vocals
- Years active: 1974–present
- Formerly of: Dollar; Guys 'n' Dolls; Bucks Fizz

David Van Day (born David Paul Day, 28 November 1956) is an English singer, songwriter and politician who was formerly a member of the pop vocal duo Dollar. He was also in the 1970s vocal group Guys 'n' Dolls (with his Dollar partner Thereza Bazar), and two latter-day line-ups of Bucks Fizz in the 1990s and 2000s.

== Early life ==
Van Day was born David Paul Day on 28 November 1956 in Brighton, Sussex, England. He trained at the Italia Conti Academy of Theatre Arts.

== Career ==
His career started as a member of song-and-dance troupe The Young Generation, in 1974 he successfully auditioned for the then-new vocal group Guys 'n' Dolls. The group had a few hits, and Van Day began a romantic relationship with bandmate Thereza Bazar. Keen to embark on a solo career, Van Day left the band in 1977, and on account of that Bazar was asked to leave shortly afterwards.

Van Day and Bazar then decided to perform together, and formed a new duo, Dollar. The band recorded and toured from 1978 to 1983, then again from 1986 to 1988. They had several top-ten hits in the UK, including "Love's Gotta Hold on Me" and "Give Me Back My Heart". He also had a brief solo career as a movie actor, appearing as a devious handyman in Michael Armstrong's 1983 horror anthology film Screamtime, opposite Dora Bryan and Jean Anderson. After a final top-ten hit, "O L'amour", in 1988, Dollar broke up for a second time. Bazar left the music industry and moved to Australia.

In the early to mid- 1990s, Van Day toured as Dollar with a succession of female singers. In 1996, he joined the pop group Bucks Fizz, who by then included only one remaining original member, Bobby G. Van Day left after a year, and then formed his own Bucks Fizz with another original member, Mike Nolan. After Nolan left in 2001, Van Day continued touring for the next two years as "David Van Day's Bucks Fizz". With both his own versions of Dollar and Bucks Fizz, he recorded and released budget-priced CDs of re-recorded hits. Neither sold well and the Bucks Fizz tracks in particular received widespread criticism from fans.

In 2003 Van Day (with Bazar) competed in the ITV1 reality show Reborn in the USA. He was the first act voted off. He caused controversy during the show, accusing producers of biased editing, and arguing with singer and fellow contestant Sonia, accusing her of "being crafty and cunning to try to save her own skin".

In 2008, Van Day was a semi-finalist on the eighth series of British reality television show I'm a Celebrity...Get Me Out of Here!, finishing in fourth place.

Van Day hosted the eleven-part reality series Brides on a Bus on Wedding TV. He also briefly appeared in the series Celebrity Coach Trip on Channel 4, and was interviewed with wife Sue Moxley on The Jeremy Kyle Show.

== Politics ==
In 2007, Van Day stood as a Conservative Party candidate for Brighton and Hove City Council in the East Brighton ward, but neither he nor the other two Conservative candidates was successful in gaining a seat.

In 2018, Van Day stood for a seat on Thurrock council in Aveley and Uplands ward as a Conservative. The election was won by MEP Tim Aker. In 2019, Aker resigned and Van Day won the subsequent by-election. He lost the seat to Labour by 20 votes in May 2022.

== Personal life ==
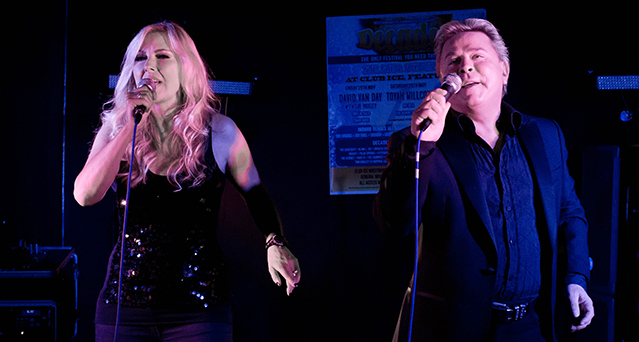
Van Day performing with his wife Sue Moxley in 2012

In the 1990s Van Day married a model called Maria. They have two children together, Amber Van Day and Olivia Van Day. He started a relationship with the beauty editor of The Sun newspaper, Sue Moxley, but initially ended it on the Channel 5 TV show The Wright Stuff. They reunited soon after and married in Orsett, Essex, on 21 February 2010. They are currently living together in South Ockendon, Essex.

During the early 2000s Van Day operated a burger van with his best friend Les Cole in Brighton, earning him the nickname "Burger Van Day"

In late October 2016, Van Day suffered a heart attack. He was taken to a hospital in Essex, England, where a stent was fitted.

== Solo discography ==
- 1983 – "Young Americans Talking" (UK No. 43)
- 1985 – "Ringing the Bell"
- 1989 – "She Said, She Said"
- 2000 – "A Fistful of Dollar"
- 2008 – "Biff Baff Boff" (with Timmy Mallett as "Croc Idol")
- 2009 – "A Big Ship on the Mersey"
