= The Songs Lennon and McCartney Gave Away =

Compilation album by Various artists
- Released: 18 April 1979
- Recorded: 1963–1973
- Genre: Various
- Length: 46:42
- Language: English
- Label: EMI NUT 18
- Producer: Various

The Songs Lennon and McCartney Gave Away is a conceptual compilation album containing the original artist recordings of songs composed by John Lennon and Paul McCartney in the 1960s that they had elected not to release as Beatles songs. The album was released in the UK in 1979.

With the exception of "I'm the Greatest", a Ringo Starr album track written for him by John Lennon in 1973, all songs were recorded and released as singles during the active Beatles years in the 1960s.

There are three songs written by Paul McCartney when the Beatles were together that are not in this compilation: “Thingumybob", recorded by Black Dyke Mills Band; "Goodbye", recorded by Mary Hopkin; and "Come and Get It", recorded by Badfinger.

A similar but less comprehensive compilation, The Stars Sing Lennon & McCartney, had been released on EMI's mid-price Music for Pleasure label in 1971.

== Background ==
Lennon and McCartney started writing songs together in the late 1950s and by 1963 were prolific composers who wrote songs for the Beatles and also for other artists. There were broadly three categories of Lennon–McCartney songs that were not released by the Beatles:

- Recordings by the Beatles of Lennon–McCartney songs that the group ultimately decided not to release.
- Lennon–McCartney songs that the Beatles deemed unsuitable for the group at the outset and did not even attempt to record themselves.
- Songs that had been intentionally written for other artists.

In the earliest days of their songwriting partnership, Lennon and McCartney expressed a desire to emulate the success of composing duos such as Goffin & King and Leiber & Stoller in having their compositions recorded by other artists, so this was an aspect of the songwriting craft that they were interested in pursuing.

With the encouragement of the Beatles' manager Brian Epstein, they supplied some of their songs deemed unsuitable for the Beatles to fellow artists, several of whom were also managed by Epstein and were friends of the Beatles. Once the Beatles' initial success in early-mid 1963 mushroomed into a phenomenon, there was great interest in songs written by the Beatles "in-house" writing duo. Artists began clamouring to secure original Lennon–McCartney songs knowing that there would automatically be media and public interest in such songs.

The quality of the songs and the subsequent commercial success of such songs added to the demand by artists for even more compositions.

== Track listing ==
Side one
No.	Title	Writer(s)	Artist(s)	Length
1.	"I'm the Greatest" (1973)	John Lennon	Ringo Starr	3:23
2.	"One and One Is Two" (1964)	Lennon–McCartney	The Strangers with Mike Shannon	2:11
3.	"From a Window" (1964)	Lennon–McCartney	Billy J. Kramer with the Dakotas	1:58
4.	"Nobody I Know" (1964)	Lennon–McCartney	Peter and Gordon	2:29
5.	"Like Dreamers Do" (1964)	Lennon–McCartney	The Applejacks	2:31
6.	"I'll Keep You Satisfied" (1963)	Lennon–McCartney	Billy J. Kramer with the Dakotas	2:05
7.	"Love of the Loved" (1963)	Lennon–McCartney	Cilla Black	2:02
8.	"Woman" (1966)	Bernard Webb (Note: Bernard Webb was a pseudonym used by McCartney when writing "Woman".)	Peter and Gordon	2:26
9.	"Tip of My Tongue" (1963)	Lennon–McCartney	Tommy Quickly	2:06
10.	"I'm in Love" (1963)	Lennon–McCartney	The Fourmost	2:08

Side two
No.	Title	Writer(s)	Artist(s)	Length
1.	"Hello Little Girl" (1963)	Lennon–McCartney	The Fourmost	1:51
2.	"That Means a Lot" (1965)	Lennon–McCartney	P.J. Proby	2:33
3.	"It's for You" (1964)	Lennon–McCartney	Cilla Black	2:21
4.	"Penina" (1969 (Note: Penina was written by McCartney at the Hotel Penina in December 1968, when he was vacationing in the Portuguese region of the Algarve. The song was first recorded by the hotel's band Jotta Herre, but a month later it was also recorded by the singer Carlos Mendes, a member of the Portuguese group the Sheiks until 1967.))	Paul McCartney	Carlos Mendes	2:36
5.	"Step Inside Love" (1968)	Lennon–McCartney	Cilla Black	2:21
6.	"A World Without Love" (1964)	Lennon–McCartney	Peter and Gordon	2:38
7.	"Bad to Me" (1963)	Lennon–McCartney	Billy J. Kramer with the Dakotas	2:18
8.	"I Don't Want to See You Again" (1964)	Lennon–McCartney	Peter and Gordon	1:59
9.	"I'll Be on My Way" (1963)	Lennon–McCartney	Billy J. Kramer with the Dakotas	1:40
10.	"Cat Call" (1967)	Paul McCartney	The Chris Barber Band	3:04

== Artwork ==
McCartney's profile in the artwork for the front cover reused a portion of the illustration from the Beatles' album Revolver, and Lennon's profile is a drawing that duplicated the back-cover photograph from his album Imagine.

== See also ==
- Lennon–McCartney non-Beatles songs
