= I Go to Pieces =

1964 single by Peter and Gordon

Single by Peter & Gordon

from the album I Go to Pieces (U.S.)
- B-side: "Love Me Baby"
- Released: 20 November 1964 (UK); December 1964 (US)
- Recorded: 1964; Abbey Road Studios
- Genre: Merseybeat
- Length: 2:25
- Label: Columbia
- Songwriter: Del Shannon
- Producer: John Burgess

Peter & Gordon singles chronology
"I Don't Want to See You Again" (1964)	"I Go to Pieces" (1964)	"True Love Ways" (1965)

"I Go to Pieces" is a song written by Del Shannon which became a top ten hit for Peter and Gordon on 20 February 1965. The duo's fourth single, it was their first not to be written by John Lennon and Paul McCartney.

== Del Shannon ==
Del Shannon had written "I Go to Pieces" for an R&B singer named Lloyd Brown whom Shannon discovered at a Michigan nightclub. Shannon arranged and produced Brown's recording but was unable to find a label interested in releasing the track. Shannon did attempt to record "I Go to Pieces" in the August 1964 session at Mira Sound Studios NYC, which yielded his single "Do You Wanna Dance" and its B-side "This Is All I Have to Give." However Shannon was unable to cut a satisfactory vocal of "I Go to Pieces" before the three hours booked for the session ran out.

Following the success of the Peter and Gordon version of "I Go to Pieces," Del Shannon recorded the song at Bell Sound Studios in New York City in March 1965. Basing his version on the arrangement utilized by Peter and Gordon, Shannon's version of his own composition was effectively one of a number of covers of recent hits which comprised his album 1,661 Seconds with Del Shannon. Shannon also sang on the remake of "I Go to Pieces" by Nils Lofgren on his 1981 album Night Fades Away. Del Shannon's final remake of "I Go To Pieces" appeared on his album Rock On!, which was posthumously released by Jeff Lynne in 1991. It features a leaner arrangement (with Del Shannon not harmonizing with himself), little or no reverb on the drums, strings replaced by a synthesizer, and a sound typical of recordings produced or recorded by Lynne at this time. While Lynne produced other numbers on the album, this track was produced by Mike Campbell. It also features Tom Petty on backing vocals.

== Peter and Gordon ==
"I Go to Pieces" passed to Peter and Gordon when that duo and Del Shannon, along with the Searchers, shared the bill for a tour of Australia in the second half of 1964. At one of the tour's venues, Shannon pitched "I Go to Pieces" to the Searchers. singing it for the group in their dressing room. Peter and Gordon in the dressing room next door overheard Shannon singing "I Go to Pieces" to the Searchers, who weren't interested in it and, recognizing the song's potential to become a Merseybeat-style hit, Peter and Gordon asked Shannon to let them record it. Peter and Gordon recorded "I Go to Pieces" at Abbey Road Studios with John Burgess producing and Geoff Love as arranger/conductor. As well as Peter and Gordon playing guitars, the session featured their guitar player, Eddie King, on twelve-string guitar.

Released in the UK on 20 November 1964, "I Go to Pieces" became the second consecutive Peter and Gordon single to miss the UK Top 50 but, as with their preceding release, "Nobody I Know," it became a hit in America, where the "British Invasion" craze was at its height. Released in the US in December 1964, "I Go to Pieces" entered the Top Ten of the Billboard Hot 100 on 20 February 1965. The title track of Peter and Gordon's third US album release, "I Go to Pieces" was cited in 1999 by Gordon Waller as his favorite of the duo's songs. Peter and Gordon's first three singles had all been Lennon–McCartney compositions, but "I Go to Pieces" began a series of four single releases by the duo which were covers of American songs.

"I Go to Pieces" afforded Peter and Gordon an international hit, reaching number 11 in Sweden while in Australia the track was a double A-side hit reaching number 26 in tandem with its flip "Love Me Baby."

"I Go to Pieces" was one of 150 songs which Clear Channel Communications requested its 1,170 stations not to play in the wake of the September 11, 2001 terrorist attacks, drawing the comment from Peter Asher that: "I suppose a song about someone going to pieces could be upsetting if someone took it literally" (However, Asher did object to the inclusion of Peter & Gordon's "A World Without Love" on the list: "[Its] sentiment [is] as true in crisis as it is in normal times. It's a totally pro-love sentiment and could only be helpful right now.")

Peter and Gordon came back together after a gap of 37 years to perform "I Go to Pieces" at the Mike Smith Tribute Concert at B.B. King's House of Blues in New York City on 2 August 2005. The song is also one of the Peter & Gordon hits performed in the multimedia live show "Peter Asher: A Musical Memoir of the '60s and Beyond," which Peter Asher has been mounting across the US since 2010, with Asher's keyboardist Jeff Alan Ross harmonizing with Asher.

== Chart history ==
=== Weekly charts ===
Chart (1964–1965)	Peak position
Australia (Kent Music Report)	26
Canada RPM Top Singles	21
Sweden	11
US Billboard Hot 100	9
US Cash Box Top 100	6

=== Year-end charts ===
Chart (1965)	Rank
US Billboard Hot 100	75
US Cash Box	84

== Remakes ==
=== Cotton Lloyd & Christian ===
"I Go to Pieces" was remade in 1975 by Cotton, Lloyd & Christian for the group's self-titled album on 20th Century Records, released in August 1975 and produced by group member Michael Lloyd with Mike Curb. Released as a single, the track reached number 66 on the Hot 100 in Billboard, in which the magazine's Easy Listening chart afforded the track a number 10 peak, as well as in Canada.

In the UK, the Cotton, Lloyd & Christian version of "I Go to Pieces" almost accrued enough interest to bring the song for the first time into the UK chart, however the track lost momentum to stall at number 51. In Australia, the single reached number 62. The Cotton, Lloyd & Christian version became a major hit in the Netherlands reaching number 17 in February 1976 with the track being included on the Dutch release of the group's Number Two album.

In 1976, the tracks from the Cotton Lloyd & Christian album - including "I Go to Pieces" - were utilized for the soundtrack of the teen film The Pom Pom Girls with unsold copies of the Cotton Lloyd & Christian album being repackaged/redistributed as The Pom Pom Girls soundtrack album. Cotton, Lloyd & Christian's "I Go to Pieces" was released as a single in France in 1977 being branded as a soundtrack item from Lache-moi les baskets (the title for The Pom Pom Girls in its French release) and featuring a distinct B-side from the single's earlier releases, with the track "I Can Sing, I Can Dance" replacing "Mr. Rock 'N' Roll".

Chris Christian of Cotton, Lloyd & Christian would include "I Go to Pieces" in a medley with "Don't Worry Baby" and "Ain't Nothing Like the Real Thing" on his 1986 live album release Live at Six Flags.

=== Other versions ===
Subsequent to the Cotton Lloyd & Christian version, Michael Lloyd would produce two further remakes of "I Go to Pieces" the first also for 20th Century Records: specifically a 1976 single release by Leif Garrett which was the first attempt - and an unsuccessful one - to turn the teen actor into a hit recording artist. Then in 1981 Michael Lloyd himself had a self-produced solo single release of "I Go to Pieces" on Arista Records.

In 1979 Rachel Sweet remade "I Go to Pieces", that track and "Sad Song" being recorded to augment Sweet's 1978 UK album release Fool Around for its US release. The new tracks were both produced by David Mackay and Barrie Guard; Sweet had wanted to work with Mackay on the basis of his work with Bonnie Tyler. "I Go to Pieces" was issued as the lead single for the US release of Fool Around in August 1979: the track did not chart in the US but did reach number 39 in Australia.

"I Go to Pieces" has twice appeared on the Billboard Hot Country Songs chart, the first time in 1988 when Dean Dillon took the song to a number 39 peak, the track being a single off Dillon's Slick Nickel album. In 1990 an a cappella remake of "I Go to Pieces" by Southern Pacific reached number 31 C&W: the number had been a Southern Pacific concert staple since the band's 1984 inception before being recorded in the summer of 1989 for their January 1990 album release Country Line album with the track being issued as a single in February 1990 - the month of its composer Del Shannon's death - although it only gradually accrued support to reach the C&W Top 40 that May. Southern Pacific member Keith Knudsen would allege resistance to the band's version of "I Go to Pieces" from C&W radio: "ten or so big [C&W] stations...wouldn't even test it. We heard [program directors say] things like - 'Well, there's no music on it'...Or - 'Well, I liked it, but that's an old Pop song [so] we can't use it.' Meanwhile, on the stations that did play it, it was the most requested record that we ever had."

Guys Next Door performed "I Go to Pieces" on their self-titled TV series, the video being shown in the episodes broadcast 27 October 1990 and 17 November 1990. Although not included in the US edition of the group's self-titled 1991 album release, "I Go to Pieces" was included in the UK edition of Guys Next Door, the UK edition featuring an additional five tracks to the US edition's ten.

Besides the Nils Lofgren remake (featuring vocals by Del Shannon) on Lofgren's 1981 Night Fades Away album, "I Go to Pieces" has also been recorded by David Frizzell (My Life is Just a Bridge/ 1993), Sonny Geraci (On the Verge/ 2000), the Ian Mitchell Band (Suddenly You Love Me/ 2008), Joe Pernice (It Feels So Good When I Stop/ 2009), Colleen Peterson (Takin' My Boots Off/ 1978), Streetnix (Listen/ 1993), Gyllene Tider (B-side of 1982 single "Flickan I En Cole Porter-Sång"), Bobby Vinton (Bobby Vinton/ 1988), Albert West (West & Friends/ 1988), and the Wynners (Love & Other Pieces/ 1975). A rendering in Italian as "Il mare non-racconta mai" was a 1967 single release by Camaleonti (it). Also the Finnish rendering "Palasiksi Hajoan" was recorded by Rock Ola & the Charades for their self-titled 1993 album.
