= Geoff Love =

British arranger (1917–1991)

- Born: Geoffrey Love; 4 September 1917; Todmorden, West Riding of Yorkshire, England
- Died: 8 July 1991 (aged 73) London, England
- Genres: Film, easy listening, pop
- Years active: 1936–1991

Geoffrey Love (4 September 1917 – 8 July 1991) was a prolific British band leader, musical director, and arranger of easy listening instrumental versions of popular music and film themes. He provided accompanying music for recordings for many vocalists. Starting in the late 1950s, he recorded under the stage name Manuel and the Music of the Mountains. He also recorded under his own name.

== Early years ==
Love was born in Todmorden, West Riding of Yorkshire, England, the only son and younger of two surviving children (an elder sister Cornelia) of African American Thomas Edward (Kidd) Love and his English wife, Frances Helen Maycock (1892–1975), an actress and singer.

The Loves travelled around Britain as entertainers, but, following the death of his father, the family returned to their grandmother's house in Todmorden. Whilst at school, Love learned the trombone. After leaving school at 15, Love worked as a car mechanic and played trombone at dance halls in the evening. Having turned professional at 17, Love joined Freddie Platt's band.

Later, in 1936, he joined Jan Ralfini's band playing in London and learned to play jazz. With the outbreak of the Second World War, Love was called up and joined the King's Royal Rifle Corps. Whilst in the armed forces, Love spent time learning orchestration by questioning musicians how best to write for their individual instruments.

== Post-war career ==
Following his release from the army, Love became a freelance trombonist and arranger, and also played with Stanley Black's BBC orchestra. He also developed his orchestration through the tutelage of the harpist Marie Goossens.

In the early 1950s, along with saxophonist Harry Gold, his brother Laurie Gold and pianist Norrie Paramor, Love was a member of the 'Pieces of Eight', playing Dixieland jazz.

Although Love continued to play trombone at recording sessions (for example with bandleader Lew Stone), he was doing more and more orchestral arrangements. His arrangements were played by the Cliff Adams Singers, Ambrose and Ken Mackintosh dance bands, as well as work for television and radio orchestras.

By the mid-1950s, Love was writing for several recording labels, moving from Philips to Polydor and PolyGram before finally settling at EMI. Whilst at the His Master's Voice label, he arranged for Frankie Vaughan and Alma Cogan, among others. At Columbia, Love arranged Laurie London's gospel song "He's Got the Whole World in His Hands", a 1957 chart topper in the US.

In the late 1950s, playing under the pseudonym of 'Manuel and his Music of the Mountains', Love created his "Theme from Honeymoon" (1959) which proved popular in the UK. His attempt to keep his identity secret whilst playing as 'Manuel' was impossible due to his success, especially in the US in 1959 and 1960.

In 1959, he and his orchestra recorded an album with British singer Shirley Bassey named The Fabulous Shirley Bassey. It was her first album for the Columbia label.

In 1964, Geoff Love's Music backed the British rock duo Peter and Gordon on their first two hit singles (both written by Paul McCartney), the UK and US No. 1 hit "A World Without Love" and the top 15 hit "Nobody I Know". Love also arranged and conducted most of Peter and Gordon's subsequent hit singles, including "I Go to Pieces"(US number 9 in 1964), "True Love Ways" (US number 14 and UK number 2 in 1965), and "Lady Godiva"(US number 6 and UK number 16 in 1966), as well as numerous album tracks.

During the 1960s and into the 1970s, Love recorded many albums for MFP, often featuring film or television themes such as: Big Western Movie Themes (1969), Big War Movie Themes (1971), Big Suspense Movie Themes (1972), Your Top TV Themes (1972), Big Terror Movie Themes (1976) and other instrumental and disco music. Big Bond Movie Themes (1975) featuring a selection of instrumental versions of music and songs from the James Bond film series from Dr. No up to The Man with the Golden Gun (including Burt Bacharach's Casino Royale from the 1967 spoof Bond film) has since become one of Love's most sought after MFP albums. One of these MFP sets was called Glad with Love, which featured the pianist Mrs Mills and Love on a sing-along together, with studio audience participation. One of Love's most recognised arrangements was "Rodrigo's Guitar Concerto De Aranjuez (Theme From 2nd Movement)" by Manuel and the Music of the Mountains (soloist Ivor Mairants), which reached No. 3 on the UK singles chart. This was announced as the number one single in the United Kingdom in February 1976, but the chart was withdrawn four hours later, due to compilation errors, making it the shortest period that a song had been number one. He also made a very popular album of arrangements of Christmas carols and songs, Christmas with Love (1972).

Love appeared on television with pianist Russ Conway and became well known for working alongside singer-comedian Max Bygraves. He was also a prolific composer, writing the theme music for the ITV sitcom Bless This House. Love also made some recordings as a vocalist.

He was the subject of This Is Your Life in 1975, when he was surprised by Eamonn Andrews.

In the early 1980s, Love was the co-founder (with Bill Starling) of the Young Person's Concert Foundation. He travelled the country with this charity, promoting music to schools and other venues. In the late 1980s, Love became involved with several brass bands.

An extract of his recording "Tico's Tune" was used as the theme tune for the long-running Gay Byrne Show on Ireland's RTÉ Radio 1 station.

== Awards ==
During his career, Love was awarded one platinum, fifteen gold and thirteen silver discs, and an award for selling in excess of 2½ million records.

== Personal life ==
Love married Cicely Joyce Peters (known as Joy, 1923/4–1993) on 4 April 1942. She worked alongside Love, organising his recording sessions and accounts. They had two sons, Adrian (1944–1999), who became a well-known radio presenter, and Nigel (1948–2013).

== Death ==
Love died at the University College Hospital, Camden, London, on 8 July 1991, at the age of 73.

== Albums and compilations ==
- The Music of the Mountains (1960)
- Mountain Carnival (1961)
- Ecstasy (1963)
- Mountain Fiesta (1964)
- Exotica (1965)
- Blue Waters (1966)
- Sunrise, Sunset (1967)
- Beyond the Mountains (1967)
- Mirage (1968)
- Magic Fountains (1968)
- Reflections (1969)
- Manuel and the Music of the Masters (1969)
- Manuel and the Music of the Movies (1970)
- Cascade (1971)
- Carnival (1971)
- Manuel Meets Pepe Jaramillo (1971)
- Mardi Gras (1972)
- The Sun, the Sea and the Sky (1972)
- Horizons (1973)
- Shangri-La (1973)
- Latin with Love in the Mood for Dancing (1973)
- Y Viva España (1974)
- El Bimbo (1975)
- Big Bond Movie Themes (1975)
- Masquerade (1976)
- Mountain Fire (1977)
- The Music of Manuel (1978)
- The Magic of Manuel (1978)
- Star Wars and Other Space Themes (1978)
- Close Encounters of the Third Kind and Other Disco Galactic Themes (1978)
- Super Natural (1979)
- Viva Manuel (1979)
- Fiesta (1980)
- Fantasy (1981)
- Great Western Themes (1988)
- In the mood for Love (1989)
- Mountain Fiesta (1990)
- Magic of Manuel & the Music of the Mountains (1991) (2-CD set)
- With Love (1992)
- Instrumental love songs (1994) (3-CD set)
- Golden sounds of Manuel & the Music of the Mountains (1996)
- Reflections/Carnival (1998) (2-CD set)
- Music & Romance (1999)
- 50 Sing Along Wartime Hits (2005)
- Very Best of (2008)
- Latin with Love & Dreaming with Love (2011)
- Big Suspense Movie Themes & Big Band Movie Themes (2011)
- Mountain Fire & Beyond the Mountains (2012)
- Star Wars & Other Space Themes/Close Encounters & Other Discos (2012)
- Mountain Carnival (2013)
- Viva Manuel!/Music of Manuel (2013)
- Big Western Movie Themes & Great TV Western Band Themes (2013)
- Waltzes with Love & More Waltzes with Love (2013)
- Music of Michel Legrand & Music of Ennio Morricone (2013)
- Masquerade/Y Viva España (2013)
- Heat Wave (2017)

=== Albums (as Mandingo) ===
- The Primeval Rhythm of Life (1972)
- Sacrifice (1973)
- Mandingo III (A Story of Survival) (1974)
- Savage Rite (1975)

== Hit singles ==
- "Honeymoon Song" (UK number 22, 1959)
- "Never on Sunday" (UK number 29, 1960)
- "Somewhere My Love" (UK number 42, 1966)
- "Rodrigo's Guitar Concerto de Aranjuez" (UK number 3, 1976)
