= Woman (Paul McCartney song) =

Paul McCartney song recorded by Peter and Gordon

- West German picture sleeve

Single by Peter and Gordon
- B-side: "Wrong from the Start"
- Released: 10 January 1966
- Recorded: December 1965
- Genre: Pop
- Length: 2:25
- Label: Capitol (US); Columbia (EMI) (UK)
- Songwriter: Bernard Webb (Paul McCartney)
- Producer: John Burgess

Peter and Gordon singles chronology
"Baby I'm Yours" (1965)	"Woman" (1966)	"To Show I Love You" (1966)

"Woman" is a 1966 single written by Paul McCartney (under the pseudonym Bernard Webb) and recorded by Peter and Gordon. McCartney intended the song to test whether one of his compositions could be successful based on its own merits without being associated with the hit-making Lennon–McCartney songwriting team, which had produced dozens of hit records for the Beatles and other acts (including Peter and Gordon). The duo's single did become a hit, reaching number 14 in the US and number 28 in the UK, but not before its author's true identity was publicly revealed.

== Authorship ==
Under the Lennon–McCartney moniker, McCartney had written three previous Peter and Gordon singles (viz. “A World Without Love”, “Nobody I Know”, and “I Don't Want to See You Again”). On this occasion, McCartney used the pseudonym Bernard Webb (though some Capitol pressings carry the name A. Smith instead) to see if the song would be a success without the Lennon–McCartney credit. McCartney commented at a press conference in August 1966, "People come up to them and say, 'Ah, we see you're just getting in on the Lennon–McCartney bandwagon'. That's why they did that one with our names not on it...because everyone sort of thinks that's the [only] reason they get hits. It's not true, really."

However, the publishing credit was Lennon and McCartney's company Northern Songs, and according to Gordon Waller it took only two weeks for the song's real pedigree to be revealed, as the first review of the record said, "This Bernard Webb has an amazing talent. Could even be Paul McCartney!" "Woman" would be overtly introduced as written by McCartney when Peter and Gordon performed the song on the 11 April 1966 broadcast of the US TV show Hullabaloo. As of 2026, the song is published by MPL Music (McCartney) and Sony Music (under a new deal between Yoko Ono and Sony Music).

== Reception ==
Billboard described the song as "a powerful ballad featuring strings, cellos in the baroque fashion and with an easy beat in strong support."

=== Weekly charts ===
Chart (1966)	Peak position
Canada RPM Top Singles	1
New Zealand (Listener)	7
UK (OCC)	28
US Billboard Hot 100	14
US Cash Box Top 100	17

== Notes ==
- Although Peter & Gordon had several hits which charted higher than "Woman", Gordon Waller would cite "Woman" as the ultimate Peter and Gordon track and his personal favourite: "You can sing it without any music, you can sing it with one guitar, you can sing it with a band, or you can sing it with a bloody orchestra. I think it envelops a lot of our other songs from that period, which were basically all love songs."
- McCartney can be seen giving a casual performance of the song in The Beatles: Get Back.
- The 1980 single “Woman” by John Lennon, is a different song.
- The demo version revealed that McCartney played the drums.
