= Tip of My Tongue (Tommy Quickly song) =

1963 song written by John Lennon and Paul McCartney

Single by Tommy Quickly
- B-side: "Heaven Only Knows"
- Released: 30 July 1963 (UK)
- Recorded: 8 July 1963
- Genre: Beat
- Label: Pye Piccadilly 7N 35137 (UK)
- Songwriter: Lennon–McCartney

Tommy Quickly singles chronology
"Tip of My Tongue" (1963)	"Kiss Me Now" (1963)

"Tip of My Tongue"

Single by The Badbeats
- B-side: "One and One Is Two"
- Released: January 1979 (USA)
- Recorded: 27 December 1978
- Genre: Power pop
- Label: Beat Bad Records1000 (USA)
- Songwriter: Lennon–McCartney
- Producers: Barry Knoedl & Bill Kern

"Tip of My Tongue" is a single by Tommy Quickly. Written by Paul McCartney and attributed to the songwriting partnership of Lennon–McCartney, it was one of their relatively few songs that were never officially released by the Beatles. Several takes of this song were recorded on 26 November 1962 at EMI Studios, although George Martin was dissatisfied with the results. This session has yet to emerge on any of the Beatles bootlegs.

Surprisingly, although Quickly's version was released in the UK as Beatlemania was taking off, the single was a flop and proved merely the first of a series of career disappointments for the singer. "Tip of My Tongue" remains one of only three original A-sides written by Lennon–McCartney not to have at least made the UK charts upon its initial release; the others being "One and One Is Two" by The Strangers with Mike Shannon and Peter and Gordon's "I Don't Want to See You Again", which did at least chart in the US, peaking at #16.

== Covers ==
Swedish band Mascots released a cover version of "Tip of My Tongue" on their 1965 debut album.

"Tip of My Tongue" was also recorded by the Badbeats on Beat Bad Records (USA) in 1979. The single was backed with another Lennon–McCartney song, "One and One Is Two". This single was the first release for either of these songs in the United States.

Recordings of "Tip of My Tongue" as the Beatles may have performed it are available on the 1989 album by Bas Muys entitled Secret Songs: Lennon & McCartney and on the 1998 release It's Four You by the Australian tribute band The Beatnix.

== Sources ==
- Lewisohn, Mark (1988). The Complete Beatles Recording Sessions. Harmony Books. p. 23. ISBN 0-600-55798-7.
