= Love of the Loved =

- A-side label of UK single

Single by Cilla Black

from the album The Best of Cilla Black
- B-side: "Shy of Love" (Willis)
- Released: September 27, 1963
- Genre: Pop
- Length: 2:02
- Label: Parlophone R 5065
- Songwriter: Lennon–McCartney

Cilla Black singles chronology
"Love of the Loved" (1963)	"Anyone Who Had a Heart" (1964)

"Love of the Loved" is a song written mainly by Paul McCartney, credited to Lennon–McCartney. It is one of his earliest compositions and featured in the Beatles live act in their early days. The group recorded the song at their 1962 audition for Decca Records, but never issued it on any of their official releases. Instead, Cilla Black recorded it for her debut single, which was produced by George Martin. The single reached No. 35 on the UK Singles Chart in October 1963.

The Beatles audition version was left off Anthology 1, even though the other Lennon–McCartney originals from the same session, "Hello Little Girl" and "Like Dreamers Do", were included.

Recordings of "Love of the Loved" as the Beatles may have performed it were released as singles by US band The Poppees (1975) and Dutch band RollerCoaster (1980). Other cover versions are available on the 1989 album by Bas Muys entitled Secret Songs: Lennon & McCartney and on the 1998 release It's Four You by the Australian Beatles tribute band The Beatnix. It has also been covered by Seattle-based Beatles cover band Apple Jam on their album Off the Beatle Track and on The Weeklings' 2016 release Studio 2, which was recorded at Abbey Road Studios along with three other unreleased Lennon/McCartney/Harrison compositions.

The original Decca audition version, along with 10 other tracks from the 1962 Decca session, is now available on the CD I Saw Her Standing There.

== Personnel ==
- Cilla Black – lead vocals
- Don McGinty - drums
