= Hello Little Girl =

Song by John Lennon

Song by the Beatles

from the album Anthology 1
- Released: 20 November 1995
- Recorded: 1 January 1962
- Studio: Decca Studios, London
- Genre: Rock and roll; Merseybeat
- Length: 1:40
- Label: Apple Records
- Songwriter: Lennon–McCartney
- Producer: Mike Smith

"Hello Little Girl" is a song written by John Lennon in 1957, one of the first songs he wrote and one of the earliest written songs credited to Lennon–McCartney. It was most notably performed by the Beatles at their unsuccessful 1 January 1962 audition for Decca Records and ultimately included on the 1995 compilation album Anthology 1. A 1960 home demo recording has never been officially released.

Liverpool groups the Fourmost and Gerry & the Pacemakers recorded versions in 1963. The former reached number nine in the British charts while the latter remained unreleased until 1991.

== Composition and structure ==
John Lennon wrote "Hello Little Girl" near the end of 1957, around the same time Paul McCartney wrote "I Lost My Little Girl". Lennon described it as one of his first finished compositions. Beatles historian Mark Lewisohn describes it as "the third song he wrote (but the first to stick)". According to Lennon, he drew on an old "Thirties or Forties song" that his mother sang to him. Lewisohn identifies it as the 1939 dance-band and film number "Scatterbrain". In particular, Lennon was captured by the rhythmic flow of lines like, "When you smile it's so delightful / When you talk it's so insane / Still it's charming chatter, scatterbrain." Lewisohn writes that the song is "steeped in the Crickets' sound" and that, "the Buddy Holly influence is overwhelming." Musicologist Walter Everett agrees, writing the song "has strong Holly characteristics." In particular, "Hello Little Girl" is the first Beatles song to recreate Holly's double-tracked vocal parts with Lennon on lead and McCartney singing the descant; the Beatles used this arrangement in almost all of their duets through 1969.

The song underwent significant changes between 1960 and 1962. Everett notes that in measures 22–23, the earlier version seeks to emulate Buddy Holly much more than the syncopated passage in the later version. The earlier version is also "supported by a single chain of applied V^{7}s, VI^{♯7}–II^{♯7}–V^{7}, whereas the later version repeats much faster-moving diatonic fifth-sequence heard nearly four full times." The change was likely made in part to accommodate added backing vocals from McCartney and George Harrison, emulating the Jordanaires and the Crickets in singing sustained vowels behind the soloist. Everett writes that the earlier version is the closest any composition by the Beatles comes to using the eight-bar bridge chord change III^{♯}–VI^{♯}–II^{♯}–V typical to Tin Pan Alley songs; He also writes that, like most early compositions by the Beatles', the song is "thoroughly diatonic, grounded solidly in the major scale," though the song features a "bluesy" guitar solo. The later version also includes a new ending, using the same triplet close heard in "Twist and Shout" and "I Want to Hold Your Hand". Musicologist and writer Ian MacDonald writes that the only musically interesting part of the song is "the swift chromatic descent at the end, paralleling the equally swift chromatic ascents in "Like Dreamers Do".

== Recording ==
The earliest known recording of the song is from 1960. (Note: Lewisohn writes it was recorded around 18 June 1960 (McCartney's 18th birthday). Everett writes it was around April 1960.) This recording features Lennon on lead vocal and his Höfner Club 40 guitar while McCartney provides harmony vocals and plays his Framus Zenith acoustic guitar. McCartney recalls, "Sometimes I'd borrow a tape recorder—a Grundig with a little green eye—[or] John would manage to borrow one, and we'd go around my house and try to record things. I seem to remember recording 'Hallelujah, I Love Her So,' because I had the Eddie Cochran record. They were very much home demos, very bad sound quality." (Note: This quotation is from a 3 November 1995 interview with Lewisohn. Audio of it is included on Anthology 1, "Sometimes I'd borrow ... those still exist".) Though the recording features Lennon, McCartney and Stu Sutcliffe, "Hello Little Girl" includes only Lennon and McCartney on guitars. The track has never been officially released but circulates unofficially.

The Beatles recorded the song for their Decca audition on 1 January 1962. Lewisohn writes that Harrison's guitar work on this recording of "Hello Little Girl" is substandard compared to his normal work. Pete Best adds full-measure snare rolls between sections. Lewisohn further writes that the track is one of the few in the session that turned out well, mostly due to Lennon and McCartney's combined lead vocal.

On 8 February 1962, the Beatles recorded "Hello Little Girl" and three other songs in an audition for radio producer Peter Pilbeam. As audition tapes were not kept, the recording is almost definitely lost. From the performance of "Hello Little Girl" in particular, Pilbeam marked McCartney as "NO" but Lennon as "YES". On 7 March 1962, the Beatles recorded at the Playhouse Theatre for Pilbeam's BBC program. They recorded four tracks for the program, including "Hello Little Girl", though it was the only song of the four not broadcast.

On 13 February 1962, Beatles manager Brian Epstein visited producer George Martin for the first time. He gave Martin a 78 acetate of "Hello Little Girl" and "Till There Was You" from their Decca audition. Epstein marked the record in pen as "Hullo Little Girl" [sic] by "John Lennon & the Beatles", crediting the song to "Lennon, McCartney" and "Til There Was You" [sic] as "Paul McCartney & the Beatles". In the raw transcripts and manuscripts for his 1964 autobiography, A Cellarful of Noise, Epstein recalls "George [Martin] liked Hello Little Girl, Till There Was You. Liked George on guitar. Thought Paul was the one for discs."

The Fourmost's lead guitarist Brian O'Hara recalls that Lennon and Harrison made him a demo tape of "Hello Little Girl" on acoustic guitars and gave it to him a few days before the recording session.

== Release ==
The Beatles rendition for their Decca audition was released on their 21 November 1995 compilation album Anthology 1.

A Decca-made acetate of "Hello Little Girl" and "Like Dreamers Do" sold for £4,000 in 1996 (equivalent to £8,000 in 2025).

In March 2016, Omega Auctions auctioned off an acetate once owned by Les Maguire of Gerry and the Pacemakers (dubbed the "Holy Grail") featuring "Hello Little Girl" and "Till There Was You" for £77,500, exceeding the original estimate of £10,000.

== Personnel ==
Decca audition (Anthology 1) version

According to Ian MacDonald:

- John Lennon – lead vocal, rhythm guitar
- Paul McCartney – bass, harmony vocal
- George Harrison – lead guitar
- Pete Best – drums

== Versions by the Fourmost, Gerry and the Pacemakers, and Sheila ==
"Hello Little Girl"

Single by the Fourmost
- B-side: "Just in Case" (Boudleaux Bryant)
- Written: 1957
- Released: 30 August 1963
- Recorded: 3 July 1963
- Studio: EMI Studios
- Genre: Merseybeat
- Label: Parlophone
- Songwriter: Lennon–McCartney
- Producer: George Martin

The Fourmost singles chronology
"Hello Little Girl" (1963)	"I'm in Love" (1963)

On 3 July 1963, with the Beatles in the studio, the English Merseybeat band the Fourmost recorded "Hello Little Girl" at EMI Studios. The song was released as their debut single.

On 17 July 1963, Gerry and the Pacemakers recorded a version of the song, but the version by the Fourmost was selected for the issue. The Fourmost's release reached number 9 in the United Kingdom. Everett describes both performances as "straight" with "square syncopation, in strictly even eights as opposed to John's much freer style, in the music-hall tradition and lacking all soul."

The recording by Gerry and the Pacemakers was not released until the 1991 compilation, The Best of Gerry & the Pacemakers. The Fourmost's version of this song is also on 1979 The Songs Lennon and McCartney Gave Away compilation album.

In early 1964, local pop star Sheila – later internationally famous as Sheila B. Devotion - released a French-language version "Hello Petite Fille" on her fifth maxi-single for Philips (cat.no. 434849). The song became the lead track for media play and the record eventually sold over 150,000 copies, reaching number 4 in the French charts and number 19 in Belgium. Her May 1964 TV performance of the track on the programme Jeunesse Oblige was the first time this piece of Lennon & McCartney music had been broadcast on francophone television.

=== Weekly charts ===
Chart (1963)	Peak position
UK Singles (OCC)	9
