= One and One Is Two =

Single by The Strangers with Mike Shannon
- B-side: "Time and the River"
- Released: 8 May 1964
- Genre: Pop
- Length: 2:15
- Label: Philips
- Songwriter: Lennon–McCartney

"One and One Is Two" is a song by the Strangers with Mike Shannon, released as their debut single in 1964. It was composed by Paul McCartney, credited as Lennon–McCartney.

== Background ==
The demo of "One And One Is Two" was probably recorded in Paris in late January/early February 1964, with McCartney singing to an acoustic guitar and piano. It was recorded at the George V Hotel during the Beatles' concert series at the Olympia at the request of publisher Dick James. The demo has not yet been officially released, but can be found on bootlegs.

"One And One Is Two" was originally intended for Billy J. Kramer & the Dakotas, but the group declined. John Lennon reportedly exclaimed during the recording of the demo, "Billy J. will be done when he gets this song". In 1980, he commented, "This is another one of Paul's bad attempts at writing a song".

The song was also offered to fellow group the Fourmost, who, like the Dakotas, had previously recorded other Lennon/McCartney compositions. Brian O'Hara, guitarist and vocalist for the Fourmost, later said of the offer, "McCartney came into the studio and played bass on "One and One Is Two", but there just wasn't any meat in the song and we couldn't get anywhere with it."

The single "One and One is Two" with the B-side "Time and the River" was finally released on May 8, 1964, in the UK by The Strangers with Mike Shannon. The song didn't get into the British charts. The group released their second and final single, "Do You Or Don't You" / "What Can I Do", in December 1964, which also failed to enter the charts.

== Covers ==
- Bas Muys – Lennon & McCartney Songs (never issued)
- The Beatnix – It's Four You

== See also ==
- Lennon–McCartney non-Beatles songs
- The Songs Lennon and McCartney Gave Away
- The Beatles bootleg recordings
