= The Beatles' Decca audition =

Audition by the Beatles in London, 1962

The English rock band the Beatles auditioned for Decca Records at Decca Studios in West Hampstead, north London, on 1 January 1962. They were rejected by the label, who instead signed a contract with Brian Poole and the Tremeloes. The audition was recorded, and five of the songs—"Searchin'", "Three Cool Cats", "The Sheik of Araby", "Like Dreamers Do" and "Hello Little Girl"—were officially released on the Beatles compilation album Anthology 1 in 1995.

== Background ==
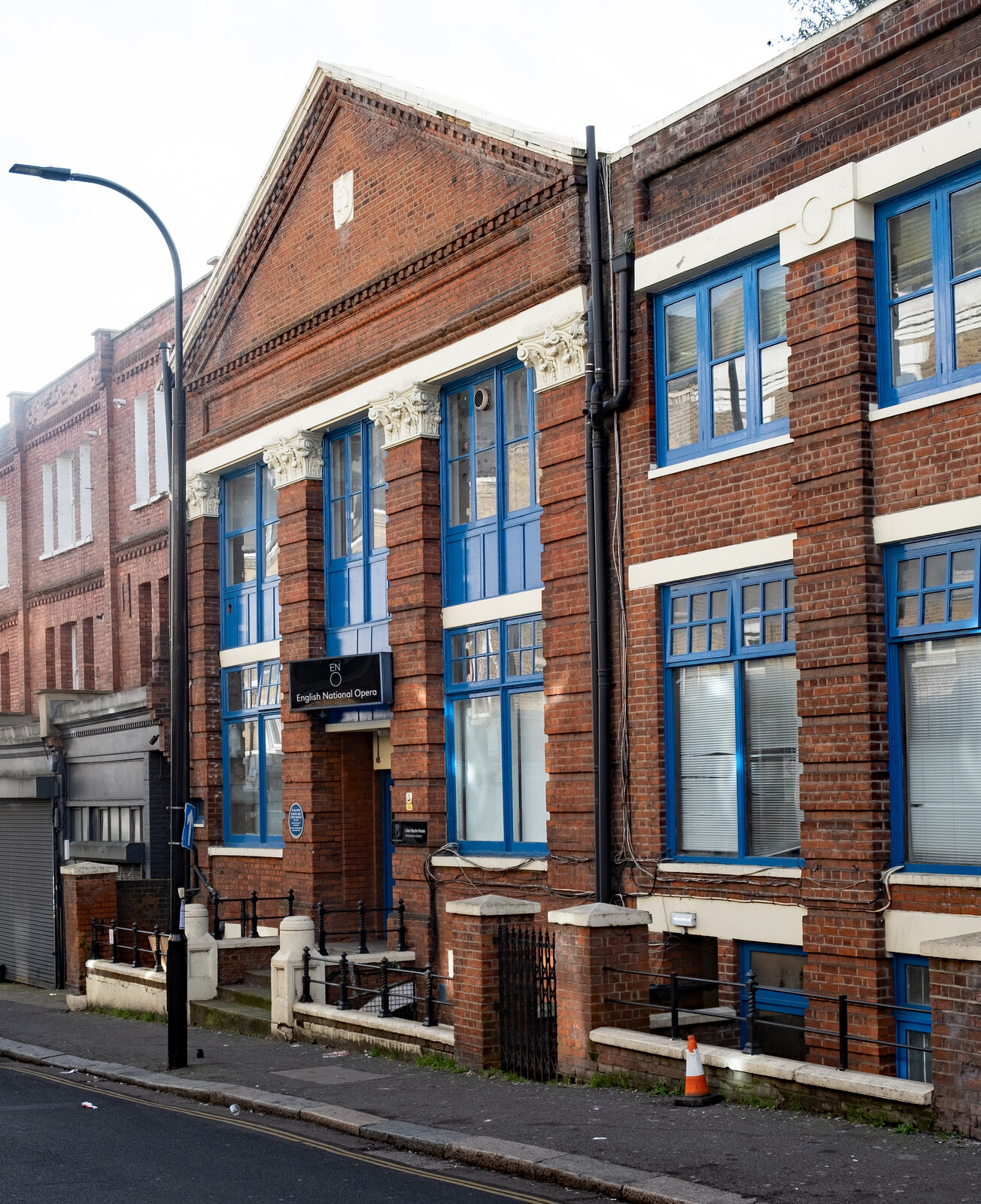
The audition took place at Decca Studios in London (pictured in 2023)

The Beatles' manager, Brian Epstein, met with record companies in London to secure a record contract for the Beatles. He was rejected by many, including Columbia, His Master's Voice, Pye, Philips, and Oriole. After Epstein had meetings with both EMI and Decca at the start of December 1961, Decca artists and repertoire executive Mike Smith travelled to Liverpool to see the Beatles perform at The Cavern Club, and was impressed enough to ask Epstein to bring the band down to London for a test in Decca's recording studios, scheduled for 1 January 1962. (New Year's Day was not a public holiday in England at the time.)

Neil Aspinall drove the Beatles down to London on New Year's Eve 1961; he lost his way, and the trip took ten hours. They arrived at 10 p.m., "just in time to see the drunks jumping in the Trafalgar Square fountain", as John Lennon described it. Decca's London studio was little more than a mile (1.6 km) from EMI's studio (later known as Abbey Road Studios).

== The audition ==
John Lennon, Paul McCartney, George Harrison, and Pete Best arrived at the audition, formally known as a "commercial test", to be headed by Mike Smith with Decca staff, on 1 January 1962 at 10 a.m. However, Smith was late, suffering from a New Year's party hangover as well as cuts and bruises from a car crash three days before Christmas, slightly delaying the start of the audition.

=== Recording ===
At the audition, the Beatles performed songs chosen by Epstein. At the time, the standard procedure for a test of this type was to record two to five songs and then quickly usher the artists out of the studio. The Beatles, however, ended up recording fifteen songs, and the recording session was extended into the afternoon, broken by a lunch break. This may suggest that, had they been offered a deal, their first single and perhaps others would have been taken from the resulting tape.

In his 1992 book The Complete Beatles Chronicle, Mark Lewisohn postulates that "[i]t's unlikely that the Beatles were given any opportunity to perform more than one take of any song", and adds that each was recorded live on two-track tape with no overdubs. The book includes a photograph of an acetate single made by Decca, containing "Like Dreamers Do".

Afterwards, the Beatles came to believe that Epstein had paid Decca to tape the audition. Lennon asserted that Decca producer Tony Meehan (formerly of the Shadows) had produced the Decca audition session, but current scholarship considers this unlikely.

== Setlist ==
For the setlist, Epstein chose 15 songs that the Beatles had performed in clubs over the years, including three Lennon–McCartney originals.

According to Lewisohn, the likely order of the songs at the session was as follows:

1. "Like Dreamers Do" (Lennon–McCartney)
2. "Money (That's What I Want)" (Berry Gordy–Janie Bradford)
3. "Till There Was You" (Meredith Willson)
4. "The Sheik of Araby" (Harry B. Smith–Francis Wheeler–Ted Snyder)
5. "To Know Her Is to Love Her" (Phil Spector)
6. "Take Good Care of My Baby" (Carole King–Gerry Goffin)
7. "Memphis, Tennessee" (Chuck Berry)
8. "Sure to Fall (in Love with You)" (Carl Perkins–Bill Cantrell–Quinton Claunch)
9. "Hello Little Girl" (Lennon–McCartney)
10. "Three Cool Cats" (Jerry Leiber–Mike Stoller)
11. "Crying, Waiting, Hoping" (Buddy Holly)
12. "Love of the Loved" (Lennon–McCartney)
13. "September in the Rain" (Harry Warren–Al Dubin)
14. "Bésame Mucho" (Consuelo Velázquez)
15. "Searchin'" (Jerry Leiber–Mike Stoller)

== Rejection and aftermath ==
The Liverpool music paper Mersey Beat was the first to report on the Mike Smith visit, saying that the producer had made a tape of the performance (this amounted to the first "test"), and added "he is convinced that his label will be able to put the Beatles to good use."

About a month later, Decca rejected the Beatles. The executives' opinion was "guitar groups are on the way out" and "the Beatles have no future in show business". Some music historians have suggested, however, that the Beatles' work that day did not yet reflect their potential, and the "guitar" comment may have been intended as a polite letdown. In his 1964 autobiography, A Cellarful of Noise, Epstein ascribed the "guitar" comment to Dick Rowe, but Rowe denied it as long as he lived. Decca instead chose Brian Poole and the Tremeloes, who auditioned the same day as the Beatles, because they were local and would require lower travel expenses. Many have speculated about who made the decision to reject the Beatles. While various accounts of the audition have been published, most agree that it was either Dick Rowe or Mike Smith. Rowe did, however, offer to arrange for Tony Meehan to produce a Beatles single if Epstein would agree to pay about £100 for the expenses, but a meeting between Epstein and Meehan on 7 February went badly, and the recording never took place.

While Epstein was negotiating with Decca, he also approached an EMI marketing executive, Ron White. White was not a record producer, but he contacted three EMI producers, Norrie Paramor, Walter Ridley, and Norman Newell, all of whom declined to record the Beatles. They eventually signed with an EMI subsidiary, Parlophone, after producer George Martin heard the Decca demos and decided to meet the band.

== In media ==
The rejection was parodied in the Rutles movie All You Need Is Cash (1978), in which Dan Aykroyd plays a record executive, Brian Thigh, who turns down the Rutles. After ruminating over the "millions in royalties" lost by Thigh's company, the interviewer (Eric Idle) asks Thigh "What's it like to be such an asshole?"

The 1995 documentary film The Beatles Anthology includes snippets from many of the songs performed at the Decca audition. The album released in 1995 as a companion, Anthology 1, includes five of those songs ("Searchin'", "Like Dreamers Do", "Hello Little Girl", "Three Cool Cats", and "The Sheik of Araby"), along with many other outtakes and live performances.

== Sale of audition tape ==
The original safety master tape the group recorded at Decca's London studios was auctioned by the Fame Bureau in December 2012 to a Japanese collector for £35,000. A spokesman for the auctioneers said at the time, "The tape went to a Capitol Records executive after the Beatles signed with EMI. He sold it to the current owner who was one of the top buyers for Hard Rock Cafe but it was for his own personal collection." The authenticity of the tape sold remains debatable among experts, however, because the tape of the audition contains 15 songs and the tape auctioned has only 10. Additionally, the auction recording is on Ampex tape, which was not in use in 1962. It has not been firmly ascertained whether the original master tape recorded by Decca on 1 January 1962 is in the possession of the Beatles' Apple Corps Ltd. A copy of the tape, widely used by bootleggers, is in the hands of a private collector.

Another audition tape (with 15 songs) was found in a Vancouver record shop on March 11, 2025. "Frith [the record store owner] said the tape appeared to be a professionally edited recording of the Beatles’ New Year’s Day 1962 audition for Decca Records in London, a session that notably ended with the band’s rejection." Frith handed the tape over to Paul McCartney in September.

== See also ==
- Outline of the Beatles
- The Beatles timeline
