= The Beatles Bootleg Recordings 1963 =

Compilation album / live album by the Beatles
- Released: 17 December 2013
- Recorded: 11 February – 26 December 1963
- Studio: Abbey Road Studios
- Length: 134:53; 37:40 (outtakes); 94:12 (BBC recordings); 3:01 (demos)
- Label: Universal
- Producer: George Martin (studio outtakes)

The Beatles chronology
On Air – Live at the BBC Volume 2 (2013)	The Beatles Bootleg Recordings 1963 (2013)	The U.S. Albums (2014)

The Beatles Bootleg Recordings 1963 is a compilation album of 59 previously unreleased recordings by English rock band the Beatles, released on 17 December 2013, exclusively through the iTunes Store. While it was initially only available for a few hours, it later became available again for purchase. The release was timed to extend the copyright of the 1963 recordings under EU law by 20 years – the EU protects recordings for 70 years only if they are formally released.

== Composition ==
The album includes 15 studio outtakes and 42 live BBC Radio tracks, adding to those released previously on the albums Live at the BBC (1994) and On Air – Live at the BBC Volume 2 (2013). The album also includes John Lennon's demo recordings of "Bad to Me" and "I'm in Love", later released as singles by Billy J. Kramer and the Dakotas and the Fourmost, respectively.

== Track listing ==
Tracks 1–14 are stereo; the rest are mono.

All tracks are written by Lennon–McCartney, except where noted.

Studio outtakes
No.	Title	Writer(s)	Length
1.	"There's a Place" (Takes 5 & 6)		2:19
2.	"There's a Place" (Take 8)		1:58
3.	"There's a Place" (Take 9)		2:04
4.	"Do You Want to Know a Secret" (Take 7)		2:17
5.	"A Taste of Honey" (Take 6)	Bobby Scott, Ric Marlow	2:12
6.	"I Saw Her Standing There" (Take 2)		3:07
7.	"Misery" (Take 1)		1:54
8.	"Misery" (Take 7)		1:56
9.	"From Me to You" (Takes 1 & 2)		3:24
10.	"From Me to You" (Take 5)		2:17
11.	"Thank You Girl" (Take 1)		2:09
12.	"Thank You Girl" (Take 5)		2:04
13.	"One After 909" (Takes 1 & 2)		4:29
14.	"Hold Me Tight" (Take 21)		2:42
15.	"Money (That's What I Want)" (RM 7 Undubbed)	Janie Bradford, Berry Gordy	2:48

BBC sessions
No.	Title	Writer(s)	Length
16.	"Some Other Guy" (Live at the BBC for Saturday Club, 26 January 1963)	Jerry Leiber, Mike Stoller, Richard Barrett	2:02
17.	"Love Me Do" (Live at the BBC for Saturday Club, 26 January 1963)		2:31
18.	"Too Much Monkey Business" (Live at the BBC for Pop Go the Beatles, 11 June 1963; incorrectly listed as 26 January 1963)	Chuck Berry	1:50
19.	"I Saw Her Standing There" (Live at the BBC for Saturday Club, 16 March 1963)		2:38
20.	"Do You Want to Know a Secret" (Live at the BBC for Saturday Club, 25 May 1963; incorrectly listed as 16 March 1963)		1:50
21.	"From Me to You" (Live at the BBC for Saturday Club, 25 May 1963; incorrectly listed as 26 January 1963)		1:54
22.	"I Got to Find My Baby" (Live at the BBC for Saturday Club, 29 June 1963; incorrectly listed as 26 January 1963)	Berry	1:59
23.	"Roll Over Beethoven" (Live at the BBC for Saturday Club, 29 June 1963)	Berry	2:29
24.	"A Taste of Honey" (Live at the BBC for Easy Beat, 23 June 1963)	Scott, Marlow	2:01
25.	"Love Me Do" (Live at the BBC for Easy Beat, 20 October 1963)		2:29
26.	"Please Please Me" (Live at the BBC for Easy Beat, 20 October 1963)		2:08
27.	"She Loves You" (Live at the BBC for Easy Beat, 20 October 1963)		2:19
28.	"I Want to Hold Your Hand" (Live at the BBC for Saturday Club, 21 December 1963)		2:19
29.	"Till There Was You" (Live at the BBC for Saturday Club, 21 December 1963)	Meredith Willson	2:16
30.	"Roll Over Beethoven" (Live at the BBC for Saturday Club, 21 December 1963)	Berry	2:16
31.	"You Really Got a Hold on Me" (Live at the BBC for Pop Go the Beatles, 4 June 1963)	Smokey Robinson	2:54
32.	"The Hippy Hippy Shake" (Live at the BBC for Pop Go the Beatles, 4 June 1963)	Chan Romero	1:43
33.	"Till There Was You" (Live at the BBC for Pop Go the Beatles, 11 June 1963)	Meredith Willson	2:14
34.	"A Shot of Rhythm and Blues" (Live at the BBC for Pop Go the Beatles, 18 June 1963)	Terry Thompson	2:06
35.	"A Taste of Honey" (Live at the BBC for Pop Go the Beatles, 18 June 1963)	Scott, Marlow	1:56
36.	"Money (That's What I Want)" (Live at the BBC for Pop Go the Beatles, 18 June 1963)	Bradford, Gordy	2:41
37.	"Anna (Go to Him)" (Live at the BBC for Pop Go the Beatles, 25 June 1963)	Arthur Alexander	3:02
38.	"Love Me Do" (Live at the BBC for Pop Go the Beatles, 10 September 1963)		2:29
39.	"She Loves You" (Live at the BBC for Pop Go the Beatles, 24 September 1963; replay of the recording from 10 September 1963 featured later on this set)		2:16
40.	"I'll Get You" (Live at the BBC for Pop Go the Beatles, 10 September 1963)		2:05
41.	"A Taste of Honey" (Live at the BBC for Pop Go the Beatles, 10 September 1963)	Scott, Marlow	2:00
42.	"Boys" (Live at the BBC for Pop Go the Beatles, 17 September 1963)	Luther Dixon, Wes Farrell	2:12
43.	"Chains" (Live at the BBC for Pop Go the Beatles, 17 September 1963)	Gerry Goffin, Carole King	2:22
44.	"You Really Got a Hold on Me" (Live at the BBC for Pop Go the Beatles, 17 September 1963)	Robinson	2:57
45.	"I Saw Her Standing There" (Live at the BBC for Pop Go the Beatles, 24 September 1963)		2:41
46.	"She Loves You" (Live at the BBC for Pop Go the Beatles, 10 September 1963)		2:15
47.	"Twist and Shout" (Live at the BBC for Pop Go the Beatles, 24 September 1963)	Phil Medley, Bert Russell	2:36
48.	"Do You Want to Know a Secret" (Live at the BBC for Here We Go, 12 March 1963)		1:55
49.	"Please Please Me" (Live at the BBC for Here We Go, 12 March 1963)		1:57
50.	"Long Tall Sally" (Live at the BBC for Side by Side, 13 May 1963)	Enotris Johnson, Richard Penniman, Robert Blackwell	1:49
51.	"Chains" (Live at the BBC for Side by Side, 13 May 1963)	Goffin, King	2:23
52.	"Boys" (Live at the BBC for Side by Side, 13 May 1963)	Dixon, Farrell	1:53
53.	"A Taste of Honey" (Live at the BBC for Side by Side, 13 May 1963)	Scott, Marlow	2:04
54.	"Roll Over Beethoven" (Live at the BBC for From Us to You, 26 December 1963)	Berry	2:17
55.	"All My Loving" (Live at the BBC for From Us to You, 26 December 1963)		2:06
56.	"She Loves You" (Live at the BBC for From Us to You, 26 December 1963)		2:21
57.	"Till There Was You" (Live at the BBC for From Us to You, 26 December 1963)	Willson	2:12

Home demos
No.	Title	Length
58.	"Bad to Me" (Demo)	1:29
59.	"I'm in Love" (Demo)	1:32
Total length:		2:10:49

== See also ==
- 1963 in music
- The Beatles bootleg recordings
- The 50th Anniversary Collection, 2012 compilation of Bob Dylan recordings also released to prevent recordings from entering the public domain
- Ashcan copy, comic book industry term for a work published solely for copyright purposes
