= I'm in Love (Lennon–McCartney song) =

1963 single by The Fourmost

Single by The Fourmost
- B-side: "Respectable" (O.Isley- R.Isley-R.Isley)
- Released: 15 November 1963
- Recorded: October 1963, EMI Studios
- Genre: Beat
- Label: Parlophone
- Songwriter: Lennon–McCartney
- Producer: George Martin

The Fourmost singles chronology
"Hello Little Girl" (1963)	"I'm in Love" (1963)	"A Little Lovin'" (1964)

"I'm in Love"

Demo by the Beatles

from the album The Beatles Bootleg Recordings 1963
- Released: 17 December 2013
- Recorded: 1963
- Genre: Rock and roll
- Length: 1:32
- Label: Apple, Universal Music Group
- Songwriter: Lennon–McCartney

"I'm in Love" is a song credited to Lennon–McCartney and possibly written solely by John Lennon. In 1963 the English Merseybeat band the Fourmost made a recording of the song at the EMI Studios, produced by George Martin.

John Lennon said, in 1971, "Me—I wrote it for the Fourmost." He seemed less definite in his 1980 Playboy interview. In Paul McCartney's authorized biography, Barry Miles seems to refer to this song as a collaboration.

Billy J. Kramer also recorded a version of the song, but the version by the Fourmost was selected for the issue and reached number 17 in the United Kingdom.

The B-side, "Respectable", is a cover from the Isley Brothers.

In America, the song was recorded by the short-lived West Coast band, The New Breed. It appears on the album The New Breed Wants You! and was the B-side of their single "Green-Eyed Woman", released on Diplomacy Records in 1965. The record was a regional success in the Bay Area (their home base) and other parts of California, but not nationally.

Recordings of "I'm in Love" as the Beatles may have performed it are available on the 1989 album by Bas Muys entitled Secret Songs: Lennon & McCartney and on the 1998 release It's Four You by the Australian tribute band The Beatnix.

The New Jersey–based band The Weeklings recorded a version of the song for their 2015 album, Monophonic. It has also been covered by Seattle-based Beatles cover band Apple Jam on their album Off The Beatle Track.

A Beatles demo version was released in 2013 on the iTunes exclusive album The Beatles Bootleg Recordings 1963.
