= Cat Call =

Song by Chris Barber's Jazz Band

Instrumental by Chris Barber's Jazz band

from the album Battersea Rain Dance
- Released: 20 October 1967 (as a single)
- Recorded: July 1967
- Studio: Chappell Recording Studios
- Genre: Jazz
- Length: 3:04
- Label: Marmalade Records
- Songwriter: Paul McCartney
- Producer: Giorgio Gomelsky

"Cat Call" (original name: "Catswalk") is an instrumental piece, composed by Paul McCartney, recorded by the British musical group Chris Barber's Jazz Band and released in 1967 as the A side of a single.

== History ==
The instrumental "Catswalk" was written by Paul McCartney in 1959 and was part of the Beatles' live repertoire until 1962. The Beatles recorded a version in December 1962 at the Cavern Club in Liverpool, without an audience, using a Grundig tape recorder. At the time, they recorded several songs including "I Saw Her Standing There" and "One After 909" for EMI in order to show their repertoire of original compositions to Dick James, their music publisher. Apart from a few improvised measures on 24 January 1969, the 15th day of the Get Back/Let It Be sessions, the Beatles never recorded "Catswalk" in a studio. The Cavern Club version has not been officially released, but it can be found in bootlegs. McCartney wished that guitarist Bert Weedon could record it, but this did not happen.

== Chris Barber ==
Bandleader and trombonist Chris Barber is the leader of a traditional jazz orchestra. With himself on bass and band members Lonnie Donegan (guitar and vocals) and Beryl Bryden (washboard), they recorded Leadbelly's "Rock Island Line", as a skiffle song. This recording became a big hit in 1955 in England and the United States and inspired John Lennon to start a band of his own, the Quarrymen (it was said that without Donegan and Barber, the Beatles probably would not have happened).

Paul McCartney later met Barber and, in 1967, offered "Catswalk" for him to record. The band recorded it at London's Marquee Club in July, but McCartney felt the result could be better. A second recording session, with a new arrangement including a choir, took place on the 20th of the same month at Chappell Recording Studios at 52 Maddox Street in London, produced by Giorgio Gomelsky. The title of the song was changed to "Cat Call", with McCartney listed as sole composer, and is released as a single in the United Kingdom on 20 October 1967, with "Mercy, Mercy, Mercy" (credited to Joe Zawinul) on the B-side, but failed to chart.

McCartney and his girlfriend Jane Asher are present at the recording and it is said that McCartney can be heard playing the organ and asking to "Please play slower" before the final section, which takes at this time a slower tempo, and heard among the choirs singing "for he's a jolly good fellow" during the finale. On the liner notes of the 1969 album Battersea Rain Dance, on which both sides of the single appear, it is instead stated that the organ is played by Brian Auger and that the voice is that of producer Gomelsky while McCartney is credited to a yell and as being part of the so-called cat callers.

"Cat Call" was ultimately included on the 1979 compilation album The Songs Lennon and McCartney Gave Away.
