= Lennon–McCartney =

Songwriting partnership between John Lennon and Paul McCartney

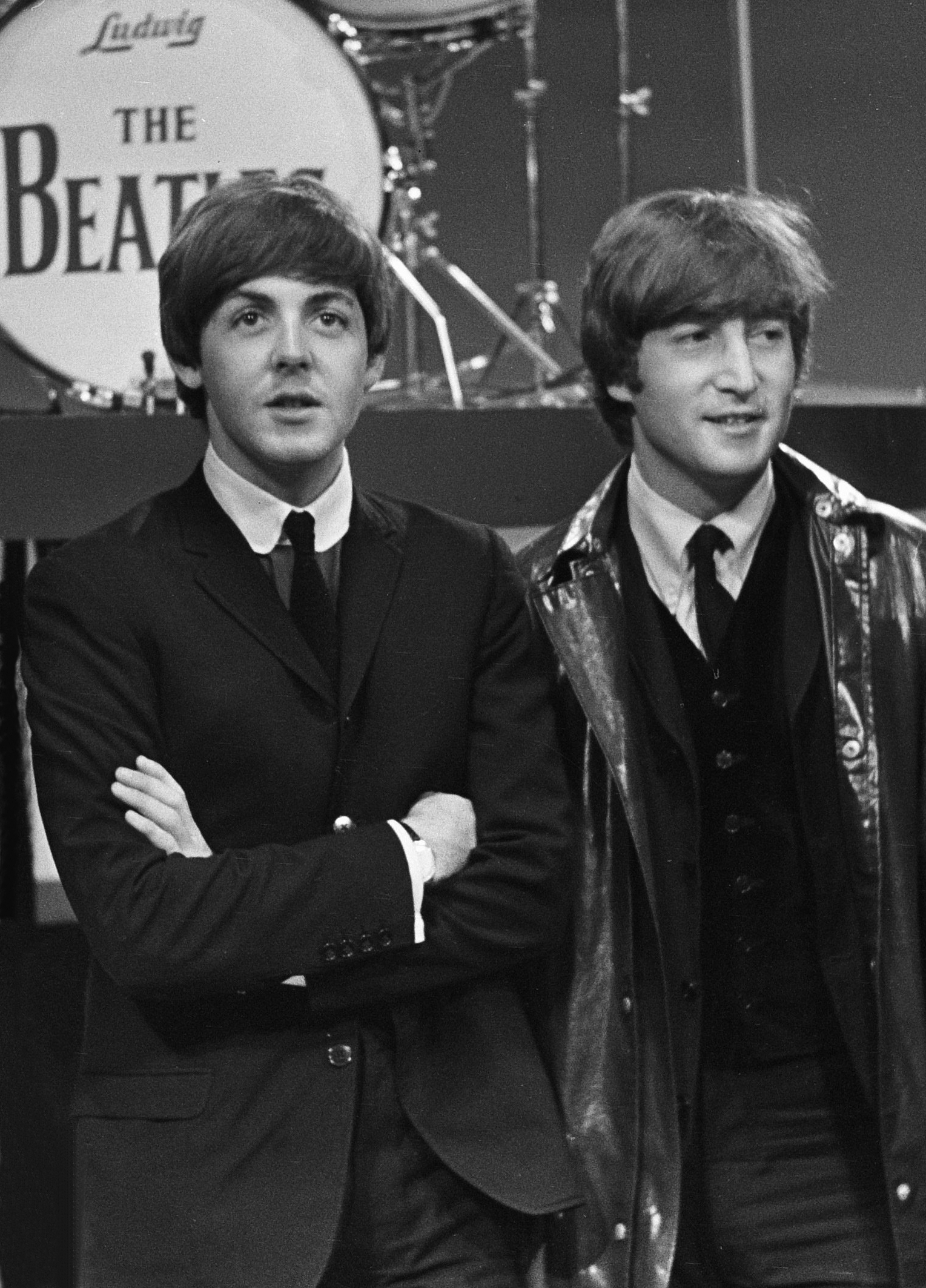
Paul McCartney (left) and John Lennon (right) in 1964

Lennon–McCartney was the songwriting partnership between the English musicians John Lennon (1940–1980) and Paul McCartney (born 1942) of the Beatles. It is widely considered one of the greatest, best known, and most successful musical collaborations ever by records sold, with the Beatles selling more than 600 million records worldwide as of 2004. Between 5 October 1962 and 8 May 1970, the partnership published approximately 180 jointly credited songs, of which the vast majority were recorded by the Beatles, forming the bulk of their catalogue.

Unlike many songwriting partnerships that comprise a separate composer and lyricist, such as George and Ira Gershwin, Richard Rodgers and Oscar Hammerstein II, John Kander and Fred Ebb, or Elton John and Bernie Taupin, both Lennon and McCartney wrote music and lyrics. Sometimes, especially early on, they would collaborate extensively when writing songs, working "eyeball to eyeball" as Lennon phrased it. During the latter half of their partnership, it became more common for either of them to write most of a song on their own with minimal input from the other, and sometimes none at all. By an agreement made before the Beatles became famous, Lennon and McCartney were credited equally with songs that either one of them wrote while their partnership lasted.

Lennon–McCartney compositions have been the subject of numerous cover versions. According to Guinness World Records, "Yesterday" has been recorded by more musicians than any other song.

== History and evolution ==
=== The Quarrymen days ===
Lennon and McCartney separately experimented with songwriting before having met each other. McCartney wrote his first song fragments – including "I Call It Suicide" and the tune of what eventually became "When I'm Sixty-Four" – in spring 1956, just shy of 14 years old. Lennon's first song, "Calypso Rock", was written about March 1957.

Although McCartney had previously seen and noticed Lennon in the local area without knowing who he was, the pair first met on 6 July 1957, at a local church fête, where 16-year-old Lennon was playing with his skiffle group, the Quarrymen. The 15-year-old McCartney, brought along by a mutual friend, Ivan Vaughan, impressed Lennon with his ability on the guitar and his version of Eddie Cochran's "Twenty Flight Rock". Soon afterwards, Lennon asked McCartney if he would join the Quarrymen; McCartney accepted. The duo's first musical idols were the Everly Brothers, Little Richard, Chuck Berry, Elvis Presley, Buddy Holly, and Smokey Robinson and the Miracles, and they learned many of their songs and imitated their sound. Their first compositions were written at McCartney's home (20 Forthlin Road), at Lennon's aunt Mimi's house (251 Menlove Avenue), or at the Liverpool Institute.

The first song that Lennon and McCartney wrote together, according to Mark Lewisohn, was titled "Too Bad About Sorrows" (January 1958), followed soon after by "Just Fun". The two boys kept song scraps in a notebook, the top of each page noting "another Lennon–McCartney original." This formulation was inspired by theatrical writing teams like Rodgers and Hammerstein. They often invited friends – including George Harrison, Nigel Walley, Barbara Baker, and Lennon's art school colleagues – to listen to performances of their new songs. However, they did not perform these songs with the Quarrymen. The pair continued to write throughout 1958 and 1959, though by summer 1959 they were writing mostly separately and presenting each other with their own songs for approval. Most compositions during this time were by McCartney. Early versions of numerous songs the Beatles and other artists recorded emerged at this time, including "Love Me Do", "I'll Follow the Sun", "Love of the Loved", "A World Without Love", and "What Goes On".

=== Hiatus, 1960–1961 ===
In May 1960, Lennon's art college classmate Stuart Sutcliffe joined the group, soon known as the Beatles. Sutcliffe's close friendship with Lennon and new role in the band made McCartney envious and disrupted the Lennon–McCartney songwriting dynamic. The pair wrote no new songs in 1960, despite needing to fill hours of stage time in their Hamburg residency. Lewisohn observed, "as a bar band, it was important the Beatles played songs people knew or might know." The dry spell continued on the next year, as neither Lennon nor McCartney wrote any new songs in 1961. The pair kept their songwriting a secret from associates and fans alike; on the rare occasions they played one of their own songs, they would not announce them as such to the audience. Possibly the only instance of such a performance was a rendition of "One After 909" at the Top Ten Club at Astrid Kirchherr's request. It was not until late 1961, around the time the Beatles met Brian Epstein, that they began regularly performing some of their original songs.

=== New songs and songwriting contracts ===
The Lennon–McCartney songwriting partnership re-emerged forcefully in 1962. Among the songs the Beatles recorded at their failed 1 January 1962 Decca Records audition were three old originals – "Like Dreamers Do", "Love of the Loved", and "Hello Little Girl". Soon after, a tape of this performance of "Like Dreamers Do" was played for EMI song publishers Ardmore & Beechwood, who lobbied EMI management to sign the Beatles as recording artists so Ardmore & Beechwood could obtain exclusive publishing rights to Lennon–McCartney songs. Around March 1962, John and Paul each wrote their first songs since 1959 – "Ask Me Why" and "Pinwheel Twist", respectively. In May, Paul wrote "P.S. I Love You".

At the Beatles' first four EMI recording sessions, between June and November 1962, the band played almost exclusively Lennon–McCartney songs. However, producer George Martin was initially unconvinced that the pair could write any hit songs. His attitude changed after the chart success of the first Lennon–McCartney single, "Love Me Do", which reached the UK top 20. Martin then offered a series of ideas that would dramatically bolster the Lennon–McCartney partnership: to record and release "Please Please Me" as their next single (which went on to become a breakout hit); to record an LP composed largely of Lennon–McCartney tunes; and to use Dick James as song publisher for Lennon–McCartney songs.

In the latter months of 1962 and early months of 1963, aspects of the partnership became formalized in legal documents. On 1 October 1962, Lennon, McCartney, and Brian Epstein signed a publishing agreement with Ardmore & Beechwood. As Mark Lewisohn wrote: "From 1 October 1962, unstoppable twin energies – the Beatles and Lennon–McCartney – were running strong, together and separate, side by side and neck and neck, parallel missions that intertwined, mutually reinforcing." In February 1963, James proposed creating the Northern Songs publishing company for Lennon–McCartney songs, fostering an arrangement whereby Lennon, McCartney, and Epstein collectively owned 50% of the new company.

== Writing chemistry ==
Lennon said the main intention of the Beatles' music was to communicate, and that, to this effect, he and McCartney had a shared purpose. Author David Rowley points out that at least half of all Lennon–McCartney lyrics have the words "you" and/or "your" in the first line. In Lennon's 1980 Playboy interview, he said of the partnership:

[Paul] provided a lightness, an optimism, while I would always go for the sadness, the discords, the bluesy notes. There was a period when I thought I didn't write melodies, that Paul wrote those and I just wrote straight, shouting rock 'n' roll. But, of course, when I think of some of my own songs—"In My Life", or some of the early stuff, "This Boy"—I was writing melody with the best of them.

Historian Todd Compton has noted that there is some truth to Lennon's statement regarding McCartney's optimism. However, it does not tell the whole story, as some of McCartney's most characteristic songs are tragic, or express themes of isolation, such as "Yesterday", "She's Leaving Home", "Eleanor Rigby" or "For No One".

Although Lennon and McCartney often wrote independently—and many Beatles songs are primarily the work of one or the other—it was rare that a song would be completed without some input from both writers. In many instances, one writer would sketch an idea or a song fragment and take it to the other to finish or improve; in some cases, two incomplete songs or song ideas that each had worked on individually would be combined into a complete song. Often one of the pair would add a middle eight or bridge section to the other's verse and chorus. George Martin attributed the high quality of their songwriting to the friendly rivalry between the two.

As time went on, the songs increasingly became the work of one writer or the other, often with the partner offering up only a few words or an alternative chord. "A Day in the Life" is a well-known example of a later Beatles song that includes substantial contributions by both Lennon and McCartney, where a separate song fragment by McCartney ("Woke up, fell out of bed, dragged a comb across my head ...") was used to flesh out the middle of Lennon's composition ("I read the news today, oh boy ..."). "Hey Jude" is another example of a later McCartney song that had input from Lennon: while auditioning the song for Lennon, when McCartney came to the lyric "the movement you need is on your shoulder", McCartney assured Lennon that he would change the line—which McCartney felt was nonsensical—as soon as he could come up with a better lyric. Lennon advised McCartney to leave that line alone, saying it was one of the strongest in the song.

Though Lennon and McCartney's collaborative efforts decreased in later years, they continued to influence one another. As Lennon stated in 1969, "We write how we write now because of each other. Paul was there for five or ten years, and I wouldn't write like I write now if it weren't for Paul, and he wouldn't write like he does if it weren't for me."

== Credit variations and disputes ==
=== Joint credit ===
When McCartney and Lennon met as teenagers and began writing songs together, they agreed that all songs written by them (whether individually or jointly) should be credited to both of them. The precise date of the agreement is unknown; however, Lennon spoke in 1980 of an informal agreement between him and McCartney made "when we were fifteen or sixteen". Two songs written (primarily by Lennon) in 1957, "Hello Little Girl" and "One After 909", were credited to the partnership when published in the following decade. The earliest Beatles recording credited to Lennon–McCartney to be officially released is "You'll Be Mine", recorded at home in 1960 and included on Anthology 1 35 years later.

Some other songs from the band's early years are not credited to the partnership. "In Spite of All the Danger", a 1958 song that the band (then the Quarrymen) paid to record to disc, is attributed to McCartney and George Harrison. "Cayenne", recorded at the same time as "You'll Be Mine", is a solo McCartney song. "Cry for a Shadow", an instrumental recorded during the Beatles' sessions with Tony Sheridan in June 1961 (one of the only full instrumentals the group recorded), was written by Harrison and Lennon.

By 1962, the joint credit agreement was in effect. From the time of the Beatles' A&R Decca audition in January that year, until Lennon's announcement in September 1969 that he was leaving the band, virtually all songs by McCartney or Lennon were published with joint credit, although, on a few of their first releases, the order was reversed (see below). The only other exceptions were a handful of the McCartney songs released by other musicians (viz. "Woman" by Peter and Gordon in 1966 [McCartney using Bernard Webb as a pseudonym], "Cat Call" by Chris Barber in 1967, and "Penina" by Carlos Mendes in 1969). Lennon kept the joint credit for "Give Peace a Chance", his first single with the Plastic Ono Band.

After the partnership had ended, Lennon and McCartney each gave various accounts of their individual contribution to each jointly credited song, and sometimes claimed full authorship. Often their memories of collaboration differed, and often their own early and late interviews are in conflict. In 1972, Lennon offered Hit Parader a list of Beatles songs with comments regarding his and McCartney's contributions to each song. In his response to the article at the time, McCartney disputed only one of Lennon's entries.

- "Help!" (1965)

Lennon described the song as co-written in 1965 interviews. In late interviews, he claimed full authorship. McCartney's stated input was on the "countermelody", estimating the song as "70–30" to Lennon. In 1984, McCartney said "John and I wrote it at his house in Weybridge for the film."

- "Ticket to Ride" (1965)

In 1965, Lennon claimed that the song was "three-quarters mine and Paul changed it a bit. He said let's alter the tune." However, in 1980, Lennon said that McCartney's contribution was limited to "the way Ringo [Starr] played the drums". In Many Years from Now, McCartney said "we sat down and wrote it together ... give him 60 percent of it."

- "In My Life" (1965)

Lennon's entry for "In My Life" was the only one that McCartney disputed in his response to the Hit Parader article. Lennon said that McCartney helped only with "the middle eight" of the song. McCartney said that he wrote the entire melody, taking inspiration from Smokey Robinson songs.

- "Eleanor Rigby" (1966)

In the 1997 biography Many Years from Now, McCartney recalled writing the music to "Eleanor Rigby" on a piano at Jane Asher's family home in Wimpole Street, and then playing it to Donovan, who supported that the song lacked any serious lyrics at that point. In 1972, Lennon said that he wrote 70 percent of the lyrics, but Pete Shotton, Lennon's childhood friend, remembered Lennon's contribution as being "absolutely nil". In 1985, McCartney said that Lennon had contributed "about half a line" to the song, but elsewhere (including a 1966 interview) he describes finishing the song with more substantial collaboration with Lennon. Harrison and Starr also contributed to this song. According to journalist Hunter Davies, the last verse was finished with all the Beatles giving suggestions in the studio.

- "And Your Bird Can Sing" (1966)

McCartney claimed to have helped on the lyric, estimating the song as "80–20" to Lennon. In Hit Parader, Lennon did not acknowledge any contributions from McCartney.

- "Being for the Benefit of Mr. Kite" (1967)

In Hit Parader, Lennon said he authored the song and took the words from a circus poster. He did not acknowledge McCartney as a contributor. In 2013, McCartney recalled spending an afternoon with Lennon writing the song based on the poster: "I read, occasionally, people say, 'Oh, John wrote that one.' I say, 'Wait a minute, what was that afternoon I spent with him, then, looking at this poster?'"

=== Lennon–McCartney vs McCartney–Lennon ===
In October 1962, the Beatles released their first single in the UK, "Love Me Do", credited to "Lennon–McCartney". However, on their next three releases the following year (the single "Please Please Me", the Please Please Me LP, and the single "From Me to You"), the credit was given as "McCartney–Lennon". According to McCartney, the decision to consistently order the credit with Lennon first was made at an April 1963 band meeting. With the "She Loves You" single, released in August 1963, the credit reverted to "Lennon–McCartney", and all subsequent official Beatles singles and albums list "Lennon–McCartney" (UK) or "John Lennon–Paul McCartney" (US) as the author of songs written by the two.

In 1976, McCartney's band Wings released their live album Wings over America with songwriting credits for five Beatles songs reversed to place McCartney's name first. Neither Lennon nor his wife Yoko Ono publicly objected to the flipped credits at the time.

Many years after Lennon's death, however, in the late 1990s, McCartney and Ono became involved in a dispute over the credit order. McCartney's 2002 live album, Back in the U.S., also used the credit "Paul McCartney and John Lennon" for all of the Beatles songs. When Ono objected to McCartney's request for the reversed credit to be used for the 1965 song "Yesterday", McCartney said that he and Lennon had agreed in the past that the credits could be reversed, if either of them wanted to, on any future releases. In 2003, he relented, saying, "I'm happy with the way it is and always has been. Lennon and McCartney is still the rock 'n' roll trademark I'm proud to be a part of – in the order it has always been."

An in-depth analysis of the legal issues was the subject of a 66-page article in the Pepperdine Law Review in 2006.

Subsequent Paul McCartney live albums Good Evening New York City (2009) and Amoeba Gig (2019) featured original credit to Lennon–McCartney songs. The new Paul McCartney and Wings live-in-the-studio album One Hand Clapping (2024) featured inverted credits to "P. McCartney/J. Lennon" for the Beatles songs.

=== Lennon–McCartney and others ===
A number of songs written primarily by the duo and recorded by the Beatles were credited as follows:

- "What Goes On" (1965): Lennon–McCartney–Starkey
- "12-Bar Original" (1965): Lennon–McCartney–Harrison–Starkey
- "Flying" (1967): Harrison–Lennon–McCartney–Starkey
- "Jessie's Dream" (1967): Lennon–McCartney–Harrison–Starkey
- "Los Paranoias" (1968): Lennon–McCartney–Harrison–Starkey
- "Dig It" (1969): Lennon–McCartney–Harrison–Starkey
- "Maggie Mae" (1969): Arrangement by Lennon–McCartney–Harrison–Starkey
- "Suzy Parker" (1969): Lennon–McCartney–Harrison–Starkey
- "Free as a Bird" (1995): Original composition by John Lennon; Beatles version credited to John Lennon, Paul McCartney, George Harrison and Ringo Starr
- "Christmas Time (Is Here Again)" (1995 edit of 1967 fan club version): Lennon–McCartney–Harrison–Starkey
- "Now and Then" (2023): Original composition by John Lennon; Beatles version credited to John Lennon, Paul McCartney, George Harrison and Ringo Starr

The German-language versions of "I Want to Hold Your Hand" and "She Loves You" were also credited to additional songwriters for assisting with the translation. "Komm, gib mir deine Hand" was credited to Lennon–McCartney–Nicolas–Hellmer, and "Sie liebt dich" was credited to Lennon–McCartney–Nicolas–Montague.

== Effect on George Harrison ==
Lennon and McCartney privately discussed, but rejected, the idea of including George Harrison in their songwriting partnership as it was being formalized in 1962. Harrison claimed later that the elevation of Lennon–McCartney had the effect of sidelining himself and Ringo Starr: "An attitude came over John and Paul of 'We're the grooves and you two, just watch it'. They never said that or did anything, but it was over a period of time. ... In a way, I felt like an observer of the Beatles, even though I was in them. Whereas, I think, John and Paul were the stars of the Beatles." Harrison (and to a lesser extent Starr) eventually became songwriting contributors to the band as well, though without major assistance from Lennon or McCartney. Harrison acknowledged that his bandmates inspired him to start writing songs, but he also admitted that the high standard of Lennon–McCartney songs intimidated him from presenting new songs while he was a developing songwriter: "We'd be in a recording situation, churning through all this Lennon–McCartney! Then I'd say [meekly] 'can I do one of these?'" In later years, McCartney acknowledged that Harrison made vital uncredited contributions to Lennon–McCartney songs, such as the guitar riff in "And I Love Her".

== Legacy ==
=== Cultural impact ===
Lennon–McCartney, as well as other British Invasion songwriters, inspired changes to the music industry because they were bands that wrote and performed their own music. This trend threatened the professional songwriters that dominated the American music industry. Ellie Greenwich, a Brill Building songwriter, said, "When the Beatles and the entire British Invasion came in, we were all ready to say, 'Look, it's been nice, there's no more room for us. … It's now the self-contained group—makes, certain type of material. What do we do?" In 1963, The Sunday Times called Lennon and McCartney the greatest composers since Ludwig van Beethoven.

The Lennon–McCartney brand would prove to be a model for several other songwriting teams in the rock genre, including, according to Lennon, the Rolling Stones' Jagger–Richards partnership. Subsequent Beatlesque songwriting teams attracted comparisons in the media to Lennon–McCartney. The new wave band Squeeze's partnership of Chris Difford and Glenn Tilbrook was dubbed the "new Lennon–McCartney" by music writers. Difford and Tilbrook expressed ambivalence about the comparison: Tilbrook felt that they "got a bit pompous" as a result, while Difford noted that, although the tag was "very useful" to Squeeze for getting the attention of radio programmers, the label "might have been a burden" on Tilbrook "because he had to live up to the challenge of [the Beatles'] kind of songwriting." In 1980, Record Mirror suggested that Andy McCluskey and Paul Humphreys – the founding duo of Orchestral Manoeuvres in the Dark – were "becoming the Lennon and McCartney of the electronic world"; music journalists subsequently began to describe the pair as "the Lennon–McCartney of synth-pop".

When McCartney teamed up with Elvis Costello in 1989, Costello's acerbic style earned him comparisons to Lennon in his role as McCartney's collaborator. McCartney, despite conceding that Costello has "got a bit of Lennon in him", characterized the pairing as "a new thing".

=== Beatles catalogue ===
The Lennon–McCartney songwriting partnership makes up the majority of the Beatles' catalogue. The first two UK studio albums included 12 cover tunes and 15 Lennon–McCartney songs, with one track ("Don't Bother Me") credited to George Harrison. Their third UK album, A Hard Day's Night (1964), is the only Beatles album made up entirely of Lennon–McCartney compositions. The next album released, Beatles for Sale (1964), included six covers and eight Lennon–McCartney originals. The subsequent release, Help! (1965), had two covers and two Harrison compositions along with ten Lennon–McCartney tracks; it was the last Beatles album to feature a non-original composition until Let It Be, which included an arrangement of the traditional Liverpool folk song "Maggie Mae". Among the songs in this post-Help! output, Harrison contributed between one and four songs per album, and Ringo Starr wrote two songs in total and received a joint credit with Lennon and McCartney for a third ("What Goes On"). In addition, "Flying" and "Dig It" were credited to all four Beatles. The rest of the catalogue came from Lennon and McCartney.

Lennon and McCartney gave songs to Starr to sing, and to Harrison before he started writing his own material. As for the songs they kept for themselves, each partner mostly sang his own composition, often with the other providing harmonies, or they shared lead vocal. If each contributed a fragment to make a whole song, he might sing his portion, as in the case of "I've Got a Feeling" and "A Day in the Life". "Every Little Thing" is a rare example of a Lennon–McCartney song in which one member of the partnership was primary composer (McCartney) but the other sang lead vocal (Lennon). McCartney sings in unison with Lennon on the verses, but Lennon's vocal is more prominent. McCartney sings the high harmony on the chorus.

In January 2017, McCartney filed a suit in United States district court against Sony/ATV Music Publishing seeking to reclaim ownership of his share of the Lennon–McCartney song catalogue beginning in 2018. Under US copyright law, for works published before 1978 the author can reclaim copyrights assigned to a publisher after 56 years. McCartney and Sony agreed to a confidential settlement in June 2017.

The duo's sons Sean Lennon and James McCartney have also written a song together, "Primrose Hill".

== Non-Beatles songs ==
Several songs credited to Lennon–McCartney were originally released by bands other than the Beatles, especially those managed by Brian Epstein. Recording a Lennon–McCartney song helped launch new performing-artists' careers. Many of the recordings below were included on the 1979 compilation album The Songs Lennon and McCartney Gave Away. Beatles versions of some of these were recorded; some were not released until after their split, on compilations such as Live at the BBC (1994) and The Beatles Anthology (1995–96).

Year	Artist	Song	Peak chart position	Notes
1963	The Rolling Stones	"I Wanna Be Your Man"	UK #12	Beatles version released later in 1963 on With the Beatles
1963	Billy J. Kramer with the Dakotas	"I'll Be on My Way"	(B-side)	Beatles version released on Live at the BBC
1963	Billy J. Kramer with The Dakotas	"Bad to Me"	UK #1	Beatles demo was released on iTunes download The Beatles Bootleg Recordings 1963
1963	Billy J. Kramer with The Dakotas	"I Call Your Name"	(B-side)	Beatles version released on The Beatles' Second Album (US) and the Long Tall Sally EP (UK) in 1964
1963	Billy J. Kramer with The Dakotas	"I'll Keep You Satisfied"	UK #4	
1964	Billy J. Kramer with The Dakotas	"From a Window"	UK #10	
1963	Tommy Quickly	"Tip of My Tongue"	—	
1963	The Fourmost	"Hello Little Girl"	UK #9	Beatles version released on Anthology 1
1963	The Fourmost	"I'm in Love"	UK #17	Beatles demo released on iTunes download The Beatles Bootleg Recordings 1963
1963	Cilla Black	"Love of the Loved"	UK #35	Beatles version released on bootlegs of the Decca audition
1964	Cilla Black	"It's for You"	UK #7	
1964	The Strangers with Mike Shannon	"One and One Is Two"	—	The song was rejected by Billy J. Kramer. The Strangers with Mike Shannon were South African.
1964	Peter & Gordon	"A World Without Love"	UK #1; US #1	Demo released in bootlegs
1964	Peter & Gordon	"Nobody I Know"	UK #10	
1964	Peter & Gordon	"I Don't Want to See You Again"	US #16	
1964	The Applejacks	"Like Dreamers Do"	UK #20	Beatles version released on Anthology 1
1965	P.J. Proby	"That Means a Lot"	UK #30	Beatles version released on Anthology 2
1968	John Foster & Son Ltd Black Dyke Mills Band	"Thingumybob"	—	The eponymous theme to a Yorkshire Television sitcom. Developed from an early version known as "Etcetera", demoed by Paul McCartney during a session for "Mother Nature's Son" on 20 August 1968.
1968	Cilla Black	"Step Inside Love"	UK #8	Beatles improvisation released on Anthology 3
1969	Mary Hopkin	"Goodbye"	UK #2	Original demo released in the Abbey Road 50th anniversary deluxe edition.
1969	Plastic Ono Band	"Give Peace a Chance"	UK #2	Although composed alone by Lennon, McCartney was credited as co-composer on the single appearance and on Lennon's compilation albums Shaved Fish and The John Lennon Collection. The credit was revised in the 1990s to cite only Lennon.

Four songs and a soundtrack album were released during this period but credited solely to Paul McCartney:

Year	Artist	Recording	Peak chart position	Notes
1966	Peter & Gordon	"Woman"	UK #28; US #14	McCartney is credited as "Bernard Webb".
1966	The George Martin Orchestra	The Family Way soundtrack	—	McCartney composed the melodies while Martin scored and directed the music for the film and album.
1967	The Chris Barber Band	"Catcall"	—	Originally known as "Catswalk", performed from 1958 to 1962 and revisited during the Get Back sessions in January 1969.
1969	Jotta Herre	"Penina"	—	Originally released by Jotta Herre and later covered by Carlos Mendes.
1969	Badfinger	"Come and Get It"	UK #4	The original demo was included on Anthology 3 and 50th Anniversary of Abbey Road in 2019.

== Unreleased songs ==
The following compositions are believed to have been written by Lennon and McCartney, but never officially released by the Beatles or any other artist except as noted below. Many have appeared on Beatles bootlegs, an exception being "Carnival of Light". The list of unreleased songs includes some of the earliest Lennon–McCartney joint works dating back to the Quarrymen, the group that evolved into the Beatles. Several of these songs were revisited during the Get Back sessions of early 1969.

Title	Year	Notes
"Keep Looking That Way"	1957	Played by the Quarrymen.
"Looking Glass"	1957	Instrumental. Mentioned in 1969 film outtakes; unknown if performed during Get Back sessions.
"That's My Woman"	1957	Played by the Quarrymen.
"Years Roll Along"	1957	Played by the Quarrymen.
"I'll Wait Till Tomorrow"	1960	Country-influenced duet briefly sung by Lennon and McCartney during the Get Back sessions on 3 January 1969.
"I've Been Thinking That You Love Me"	1960	Briefly performed during the Get Back sessions on 3 January 1969.
"Some Days"	1960	Speculative titles based on taped works-in-progress. "You'll Be Mine", also recorded at the time, was released on Anthology 1.
"You Must Write Everyday"	1960	Speculative titles based on taped works-in-progress. "You'll Be Mine", also recorded at the time, was released on Anthology 1.
"Well Darling"	1960	Speculative titles based on taped works-in-progress. "You'll Be Mine", also recorded at the time, was released on Anthology 1.
"Come on People"	1960	Speculative titles based on taped works-in-progress. "You'll Be Mine", also recorded at the time, was released on Anthology 1.
"I Don't Know"	1960	Speculative titles based on taped works-in-progress. "You'll Be Mine", also recorded at the time, was released on Anthology 1.
"Pinwheel Twist"	1962	Performed live in 1962.
"Carnival of Light"	1967	Recorded on 5 January 1967; nearly 14-minute-long experimental collage.
"Shirley's Wild Accordion"	1967	Recorded on 12 October 1967; instrumental intended for Magical Mystery Tour film.
"Etcetera"	1968	Recorded by McCartney on 20 August 1968, with "Mother Nature's Son" and "Wild Honey Pie".
"Watching Rainbows"	1969	Sung by Lennon; performed during the Get Back sessions on 14 January 1969.

== See also ==
- Outline of the Beatles
- The Beatles timeline
- List of songs recorded by the Beatles
- List of songwriter collaborations
- Jagger–Richards
