= Gordon Waller =

Scottish guitarist, singer and songwriter (1945–2009)

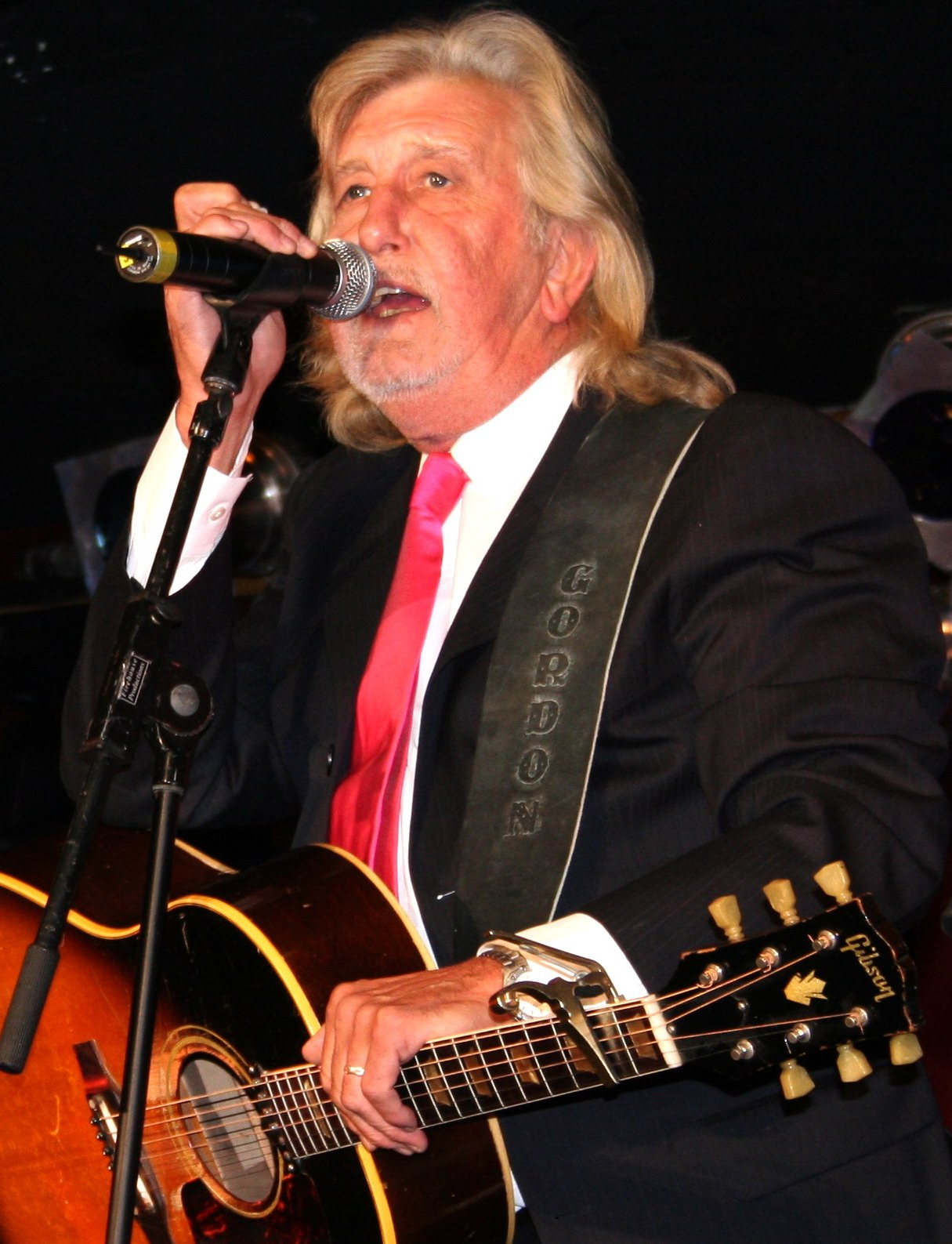
- Waller in 2005
- Born: Gordon Trueman Riviere Waller; 4 June 1945; Braemar, Aberdeenshire, Scotland
- Died: 17 July 2009 (aged 64); Norwich, Connecticut, U.S.
- Occupations: Guitarist; singer; songwriter
- Years active: 1952–2009
- Spouses: Gay Robbins; Georgiana Steele; Josenia (Jen) Couldrey

Gordon Trueman Riviere Waller (4 June 1945 – 17 July 2009) was a Scottish guitarist, singer-songwriter and actor, best known as Gordon of the 1960s pop music duo Peter and Gordon, whose biggest hit was the no. 1 million-selling single "A World Without Love".

== Early life ==
Waller was born in Braemar, Aberdeenshire, Scotland, the son of a prominent surgeon who was based in Pinner. His family lived in London, England, but his mother moved to Scotland to give birth to him, as the Second World War was still happening. When Waller was a small child, the family moved to Middlesex, where he gained entrance to Westminster School.

== Career ==
=== Peter and Gordon ===
While attending Westminster School he met fellow student Peter Asher, likewise the son of a doctor, in 1959 and they began playing together as a duo – Peter and Gordon. Asher mentioned in a 2006 interview that "Our voices are quite different, Gordon's and mine, but we tried singing together experimentally and we found that we could achieve this very nice harmony."

They secured a two-week residency at The Pickwick Club, owned by Harry Secombe, while Asher was studying philosophy at university and Waller was still at boarding school. Every evening, Gordon would sneak out of boarding school by climbing over the school gates to attend the gig, however one night he stabbed the bottom of his foot on the gates spikes, permanently damaging it (Waller said in an interview in the 2000s that a hole was still there). Through Secombe, they met Norman Newell, who signed them to EMI.

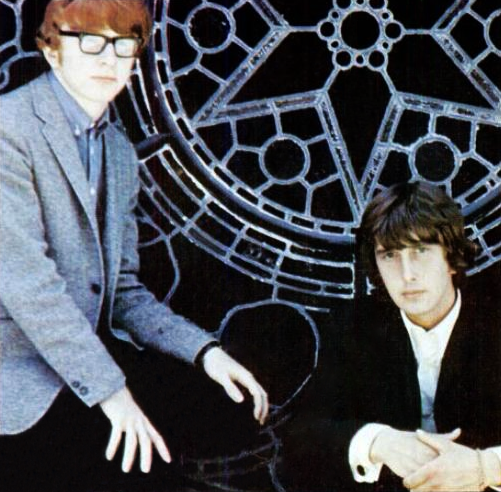
Peter and Gordon in 1966

Asher is the elder brother of actress and businesswoman Jane Asher, who in the mid-1960s was girlfriend of the Beatles' Paul McCartney. Through this connection he and Waller were given unrecorded Lennon–McCartney songs to perform, most notably the duo's first and biggest hit, "A World Without Love" (1964), which went to number one in both the UK and US. The duo were one of the most popular acts to come to America from the UK as a part of the British Invasion.

Peter and Gordon disbanded in 1968. Waller described the duo parting ways: "We just decided we'd done what we could do at the time. In those days, even if you were top of the bill, you only did like 20 to 25 minutes. By about '67, '68, that 25 minutes was just taken up with playing hits. So we didn't have time for anything other than the hits. It just got very, very tedious doing the same songs night after night after night. So we said let's give it a break for a bit and concentrate on recording."

Peter and Gordon reunited for a benefit concert in 2005 for Mike Smith of The Dave Clark Five. From then onwards the two would reunite a few more times. On 19 July 2008, Peter and Gordon performed together at The Cannery Casino in Las Vegas, Nevada. Also on the bill that night were Chad & Jeremy. Both duos sang the final concert song ("Bye Bye Love") together for only the second time. On 21 August 2008, they performed a free concert on the pier in Santa Monica, California, briefly accompanied by Joan Baez. On 2 February 2009 Gordon performed with Asher at the Surf Ballroom as part of a tribute concert marking the 50th anniversary of "the Day the Music Died".

=== Solo career ===
With Waller and Asher parting ways, Waller attempted a solo career with little success, releasing one record, ...and Gordon. He also appeared in a production of Joseph and the Amazing Technicolor Dreamcoat as Pharaoh in 1971, a performance that he reprised on the LP. Waller first performed "Joseph" at the Edinburgh Festival, later reprising the role at the Albery Theatre in London's West End.

Waller returned to recording in 2002 as part of the He's a Rebel: The Gene Pitney Story Retold project produced by Gary Pig Gold. In 2007, Waller released a solo album Plays the Beatles, featuring a new recording of "Woman", which Paul McCartney wrote under the pseudonym of Bernard Webb, and which had been a Peter and Gordon hit in the mid-1960s. In 2008, he followed up with the release of Rebel Rider.

== Personal life ==
Waller married three times. The first two ended in divorce. His first wife was Gay Robbins; his second marriage was to Georgiana Steele, which lasted from August 1998 to 2007. His third marriage, to Josenia (Jen) Couldrey, lasted from March 2008 until his death.

In the 1970s, Waller ran a landscape gardening business in Northamptonshire and worked as a photocopier salesman with Rank Xerox in Leicester. Waller lived in the village of Fowey, in Cornwall, for eight years in the late 1980s, where he ran a gift shop and dinghy repair service.

At the time of his death, his first wife continued to reside in Fowey and his daughters remained associated with the village. In 1995, he moved to Los Angeles, California, and started a publishing company, Steel Wallet International. Ltd., with his longtime friend and later wife, Georgiana Steele. In later life, Waller lived in Ledyard, Connecticut.

Waller was an alcoholic throughout most of his adulthood.

== Death ==
Waller went into cardiac arrest on the evening of 16 July 2009, and died of a heart attack early in the morning of 17 July, aged 64, at William W. Backus Hospital in Norwich, Connecticut. He is survived by his two grown daughters, Phillippa and Natalie, both by first wife Gay, and a granddaughter, Tyla, as well as both his sisters, Diana and Annie.

On 29 May 2010 a sold-out tribute performance for Gordon Waller was held at the Cannery Casino and Hotel, which was Waller's favourite Las Vegas venue. Performers included Peter Asher, Chad and Jeremy, Denny Laine, Terry Sylvester of The Hollies, Ian Whitcomb, John Walker of the Walker Brothers and DJ Fontana, Elvis Presley's drummer.

Peter Asher said of Waller: "He was my best friend at school almost half a century ago. He was not only my musical partner but played a key role in my conversion from only a snooty jazz fan to a true rock and roll believer as well. Without Gordon I would never have begun my career in the music business in the first place. Our professional years together in the sixties constitute a major part of my life and I have always treasured them. We remained good friends even while we were pursuing entirely separate professional paths and I was so delighted that after a hiatus of almost forty years we ended up singing and performing together again more recently for the sheer exhilarating fun of it. Gordon remains one of my very favourite singers of all time and I am still so proud of the work that we did together."

== Discography ==
=== With Peter and Gordon ===
- In Touch With... (1964)
- Peter and Gordon (1964)
- World Without Love (1964)
- Hurtin' 'n' Lovin' (1965)
- I Don't Want to See You Again (1965)
- I Go to Pieces (1965)
- True Love Ways (1965)
- Best of Peter and Gordon (1966)
- Peter and Gordon Sing & Play the Hits of Nashville (1966)
- Somewhere (1966)
- Woman (1966)
- In London for Tea (1967)
- Knight in Rusty Armour (1967)
- Lady Godiva (1967)
- Hot Cold & Custard (1968)
- Best of Peter and Gordon (1983)
- Hits of Peter and Gordon (1983)
- Best of Peter and Gordon (1991)
- Ultimate Peter and Gordon (2001)
- Definitive Collection: Knights in Rusty Armour (2003)

=== Solo albums ===
Year	Title	Notes
1972	...and Gordon	
1974	Joseph and the Amazing Technicolor Dreamcoat	Voice of Pharaoh
1996	Race with Destiny	
2007	Plays the Beatles	
2008	Rebel Rider	

=== Singles ===
Year	Label	A-side	B-side
1968	Columbia Records	"Rosecrans Blvd."	"Red, Cream And Velvet"
1968	Columbia Records	"Every Day"	"Because Of A Woman"
1968	Columbia Records	"Weeping Analeah"	"The Seventh Hour"
1969	Bell Records	"I Was A Boy When You Needed A Man"	"The Lady In The Window"
1970	Bell Records	"You're Only Gonna Hurt Yourself"	"Sunshine"
