= Tommy Quickly =

English rock and roll singer (born 1945)

- Born: Thomas Quigley; 7 July 1945 (age 81); Norris Green, Liverpool, Lancashire, England
- Genres: Pop music
- Occupation: Musician
- Instrument: Vocals
- Years active: 1962–1966
- Labels: Piccadilly, Pye
- Formerly of: The Remo Four

Tommy Quickly (born Thomas Quigley, 7 July 1945) is an English rock and roll singer who recorded mostly in the early 1960s. He was a later signing of artist manager Brian Epstein, whose biggest act was the Beatles. He was born to Patrick Quigley and Dorothy Gower. He is the twin brother of Patricia Quigley.

== Professional career ==
Spotted as the vocalist with local group the Challengers, Epstein liked Quigley but not the band, suggesting first a name change (to "Tommy Quickly and the Stops"), then pairing him instead with the Remo Four. The next change was in song selection; while Quickly's voice was best suited to rhythm and blues, Epstein steered him toward pop songs, starting with his first single, "Tip of My Tongue", written by John Lennon and Paul McCartney of the Beatles. He then made the usual round of appearances on stage and in public, and was promoted by Epstein as part of his NEMS Enterprises artist stable.

"Tip of My Tongue" was a flop, as were his next three singles. His fifth single, "Wild Side of Life", made the Top 40 of the UK Singles Chart, spending eight weeks there. Quickly was offered the Lennon–McCartney song "No Reply", but when he failed to issue it, the Beatles took it back and recorded it themselves. Described as young, naive and impulsive, and seemingly overwhelmed with matters since parting with the Challengers, Quickly was ill-prepared for the spotlight. When follow-up hits did not materialise, and with manager Epstein unable to push him further, Quickly retired from the music industry in 1965. Switching to television, Quickly served as co-host of The Five O'Clock Club, a variety show aimed at children under twelve, from January 1965 to January 1966. Later that year he spent time in Walton Hospital, Liverpool, suffering from a breakdown; he has remained out of the spotlight ever since.

Tommy Quickly and the Remo Four can be seen performing "Humpty Dumpty" in the 1965 film Pop Gear (released in the United States as Go Go Mania). Was a guest on American Music Show "Shindig" on December 9th 1964 and sang "I'll Go Crazy".

== Singles ==
- "Tip of My Tongue" (Lennon–McCartney) / "Heaven Only Knows" (30 July 1963, Piccadilly 7N 35137)
- "Kiss Me Now” / "No Other Love" (1963, Piccadilly 7N 35151)
- "Prove It" (Gerry Marsden) / "Haven't You Noticed" (1964, Piccadilly 7N 35167)
- "You Might as Well Forget Him" / "It's as Simple as That" (1964, Piccadilly 7N 35183)
- "The Wild Side of Life" / "Forget the Other Guy" (October 1964, Pye 7N 15708) UK No. 33
- "Humpty Dumpty" / "I'll Go Crazy" (December 1964, Pye 7N 15748)

== In popular culture ==
Tommy Quickly is portrayed by British actor Andrew Gower in the 2020 independent short film, Humpty Fu*king Dumpty, which depicts Quickly's mental breakdown after his career failed. The film was written and directed by Stephen Walters, and released on 8 May 2020 on their official website HumptyFilm.com.
