= The Applejacks (British band) =

English beat group

- Origin: Solihull, Warwickshire, England
- Genres: Brumbeat, rock and roll
- Years active: 1963–1967
- Label: Decca
- Past members: Al Jackson; Martin Baggott; Don Gould; Phil Cash; Gerry Freeman; Megan Davies; Paul Willetts

The Applejacks were an English beat group of the 1960s. They were the first "Brumbeat" group (that is, from the West Midlands conurbation-Birmingham area) to reach the Top 10 of the UK Singles Chart, and were unusual for having a female bass guitarist, Megan Davies.

== History ==
All of the Applejacks (except Jackson) were members of the same scout troop as children. Baggott, Cash and Freeman began playing together in a skiffle group named the Crestas in 1961, occasionally performing at a local youth club. Davies joined the group in 1961, Gould the following year. Lacking a vocalist, they were strictly an instrumental band until the addition of singer Al Jackson in 1963; they began playing rock and roll songs and secured a residency at Solihull Civic Hall. During that time, they changed their name to the Jaguars before finally becoming the Applejacks in July 1962.

Signed to Decca Records late in 1963, their success was largely due to the strength of their first single, "Tell Me When". Written by Les Reed and Geoff Stephens, "Tell Me When" was released in February 1964 and shot to No. 7 in the UK Singles Chart. After the group met the Beatles during rehearsals for a television appearance, John Lennon and Paul McCartney provided the Applejacks with a song which was to be their second single: "Like Dreamers Do". However, the record only reached number 20 in the UK chart, whilst their final hit, "Three Little Words (I Love You)" (also in 1964), made it to No. 23.

The group quarrelled with Decca over their next single. Decca wanted them to record "Chim Chim Chiree", but the group disliked the song. Although the single had been announced (and is therefore listed in most discographies), it was never released. According to Megan Davies, the group did not even record "Chim Chim Chiree". Thanks to that quarrel, their next single, "Bye Bye Girl", was released half a year after "Three Little Words".

Although Decca continued to issue Applejacks recordings during 1965 (including the first released version of Ray Davies's "I Go to Sleep"), they met with little response from the public, leading to a rapid return to playing local gigs. After 1966, the group became an act on cruise liners, working for Cunard until the end of the decade and frequently aboard the RMS Queen Mary, RMS Queen Elizabeth, and Queen Elizabeth 2.

Freeman and Davies were married in September 1964, with the other band members serving as groomsmen. Davies eventually retired from music to become a nurse and hospital administrator for the National Health Service.

They were once described as the "Solihull Sound", and Chris May and Tim Phillips compared their music to the bijou doorbells popular in Solihull at the time.

On 11 December 2010, the band came together once more to perform a one-off concert at St Mary's Church, Solihull, in which church the Applejacks practised in the early days. The concert was meant to raise funds for the church.

Freeman died in December 2025.

== Original band members ==
- Al Jackson (born Harry Llewellyn Jackson, 21 April 1945, Birmingham, Warwickshire), lead vocals (from July 1962);
- Martin Baggott (born Martin Thomas Baggott, 20 October 1947, Birmingham, Warwickshire), lead guitar (from early 1961);
- Don Gould (born Donald Peter Gould, 23 March 1947, Solihull, Warwickshire), organ (from December 1961);
- Phil Cash (born Philip Peter Cash, 9 October 1947, Birmingham, Warwickshire), rhythm guitar (from early 1961);
- Gerry Freeman (born Gerald Ernest Freeman, 5 May 1943, Solihull, Warwickshire – died December 2025), drums (from early 1961);
- Megan Davies (born Megan Kelso Davies, 25 March 1944, Sheffield, West Riding of Yorkshire), bass (from early 1961)

== UK discography ==
=== Singles ===
- "Tell Me When" / "Baby Jane" (Decca F 11833) 14 February 1964 (No. 7 UK, No. 135 U.S.)
- "Like Dreamers Do" / "Everybody Fall Down" (Decca F 11916) 5 June 1964 (No. 20 UK)
- "Three Little Words (I Love You)" / "You're the One" (Decca F 11981) 18 September 1964 (No. 23 UK)
- "Chim Chim Chiree" / "It's Not a Game Anymore" (Decca F 12050) 19 March 1965 (withdrawn)
- "Bye Bye Girl" / "It's Not a Game Anymore" (Decca F 12106) 19 March 1965
- "I Go to Sleep" / "Make Up or Break Up" (Decca F 12216) 27 August 1965
- "I'm Through" / "We Gotta Get Together" (Decca F 12301) December 1965
- "You've Been Cheating" / "Love Was in My Eyes" (CBS 202615) 10 March 1967

=== Albums ===
- The Applejacks (Decca LK 4635) October 1964:
  - "Tell Me When" / "Wishing Will Never Make It So" / "Over Suzanne" / "Hello Josephine" / "As a Matter Of Fact" / "Too Much Monkey Business" / "Memories of You" / "Ain't That Just Like Me" / "Kansas City" / "I Wonder" / "Three Little Words (I Love You)" / "Baby Jane" / "No Time" / "See If She Cares" / "What's the Matter Little Girl" / "What'd I Say"

=== CD samplers ===
- Tell Me When (Deram 820 968-2, October 1990):
  - "Tell Me When" / "Wishing Will Never Make It So" / "Over Suzanne" / "Hello Josephine" / "As a Matter of Fact" / "Too Much Monkey Business" / "Memories of You" / "Ain't That Just Like Me" / "Kansas City" / "I Wonder" / "Three Little Words (I Love You)" / "Baby Jane" / "No Time" / "See If She Cares" / "What's the Matter Little Girl" / "What'd I Say" / "Like Dreamers Do" / "Everybody Fall Down" / "You’re the One for Me" / "I Go to Sleep"
- The Applejacks (Cherry Red Records CDMRED411, June 2009):
  - "Tell Me When" / "Wishing Will Never Make It So" / "Over Suzanne" / "Hello Josephine" / "As a Matter Of Fact" / "Too Much Monkey Business" / "Memories of You" / "Ain't That Just Like Me" / "Kansas City" / "I Wonder" / "Three Little Words (I Love You)" / "Baby Jane" / "No Time" / "See If She Cares" / "What's the Matter Little Girl" / "What'd I Say" / "Like Dreamers Do" / "Everybody Fall Down" / "You’re the One for Me" / "Bye Bye Girl" / "It's Not a Game Anymore" / "I Go to Sleep" / "Make Up or Break Up" / "I’m Through" / "We Gotta Get Together" / "Baby's in Black"

== See also ==
- List of performers on Top of the Pops
- List of artists under the Decca Records label
- Tudor Grange Grammar School
- Lennon–McCartney
