= Etcetera (song) =

Song by the Beatles
- Released: Unreleased
- Recorded: 20 August 1968
- Studio: EMI Studios, London
- Genre: Folk music
- Length: Unknown
- Songwriter: Paul McCartney
- Producer: George Martin

"Etcetera" is an unreleased song recorded as a demo by Paul McCartney on 20 August 1968, during a session for The Beatles (also known as "the White Album").

== Background ==
Paul McCartney recalls in his authorised biography, Many Years from Now, that he had written the song, intending to give it to Marianne Faithfull to record, but she passed on recording it, as did the Beatles. The music was then adapted, and given to the Black Dyke Mills Band, whose brass band instrumental version "Thingumybob" became the A-side of one of the first four simultaneously released singles on the Beatles' new record label Apple.

== Recording ==
The song was recorded as a demo during the same session that produced other "White Album" songs "Mother Nature's Son" and "Wild Honey Pie". McCartney recorded one take of the song while waiting for session musicians to arrive. After the take was recorded, the tape was taken away by George Martin's assistant, Chris Thomas. The recording is said to have lyrics, a bridge, and an introduction that is reminiscent of "Here, There and Everywhere".

== Unreleased status ==
McCartney himself has not spoken well of "Etcetera". He has stated that "it's a bad song" and that he's "glad it died in a tape bin". On the other hand, engineer Alan Brown called it "a very beautiful song." Brown described the song as a "ballad and has the word 'etcetera' several times in the lyric. I only heard it twice: when [McCartney] recorded it and when we played it back to him. The tape was taken away and I've never heard of it since."

Music critic Richie Unterberger describes "Etcetera" as "the second most sought-after outtake" from the White Album. In terms of the tape itself, Unterberger writes that EMI engineer Alan Brown recalled that the tape is no longer in EMI's vaults. However, an acetate copy of the song has surfaced in McCartney's personal archive in the early years of the 21st century. The song has yet to be released officially.

== Personnel ==
- Paul McCartney – vocals, acoustic guitar

Personnel per The Beatles Bible.
