= A Cellarful of Noise =

Book by Brian Epstein

- Front cover
- Author: Brian Epstein
- Published: October 2, 1964 (Souvenir Press)
- Pages: 224
- ISBN: 978-0-671-01196-3
- OCLC: 39211052

A Cellarful of Noise is the autobiography of the Beatles' manager Brian Epstein, published on October 2, 1964. Derek Taylor, Epstein's assistant, ghostwrote the book, which describes the early days of the Beatles.

Epstein asked John Lennon what he thought the book should be called, and Lennon suggested "Queer Jew". Lennon later was quoted as saying that the book should have been titled "A Cellarful of Boys" in reference to Epstein's homosexuality.

In the 1978 film All You Need Is Cash, a book by Leggy Mountbatten—the manager of the Rutles and a parody of Epstein—is titled A Cellarful of Goys.

The phrase is also in the lyrics of Petula Clark's 1965 hit "I Know a Place". Harry Shearer "dramatically reproduced" quotations from this book for the music documentary Pop Chronicles. Epstein himself had begun recording an audio edition, but it was never finished, though brief excerpts did appear on the Beatles compilation Anthology 1 in 1995.

The book was reprinted by Souvenir Press with an introduction by Craig Brown in 2021.

We knew that America would make us or break us as world stars. In fact, she made us.
