= Like Dreamers Do =

Song by Paul McCartney

Single by the Applejacks
- B-side: "(Boom, Boom, Boom, Boom) Everybody Fall Down" (Dello, Ray Cane)
- Released: 5 June 1964
- Recorded: April 1964
- Studio: Decca Studios, London
- Genre: Beat
- Label: Decca F11916 (UK); London 9681 (US and Canada)
- Songwriter: Lennon–McCartney
- Producer: Mike Smith

The Applejacks singles chronology
"Tell Me When" (1964)	"Like Dreamers Do" (1964)	"Three Little Words (I Love You)" (1964)

"Like Dreamers Do"

Song by the Beatles

from the album Anthology 1
- Released: 20 November 1995
- Recorded: 1 January 1962
- Genre: Rock, Merseybeat
- Length: 2:36
- Label: Apple
- Songwriter: Lennon–McCartney

"Like Dreamers Do" is a song written by Paul McCartney in 1959 and one of the earliest written songs credited to Lennon–McCartney. It was most notably performed by the Beatles at their unsuccessful 1 January 1962 audition for Decca Records. That performance, which took place before Ringo Starr joined the band and featured Pete Best on drums, was recorded by Decca and was finally released on the Beatles' Anthology 1 in 1995.

The Beatles' Decca rendition of "Like Dreamers Do" was received favourably by employees at EMI's publishing arm, Ardmore & Beechwood, in February 1962. Based on that tape, Ardmore & Beechwood became interested in publishing recordings of Lennon–McCartney songs and played a pivotal role in securing the Beatles a recording contract with EMI several months later.

In 1964, the track was recorded by Decca Records band the Applejacks and released as the group's second single, reaching No. 20 on the UK Singles Chart. The Applejacks worked with Mike Leander from Decca as the musical director.

Bas Muys covered "Like Dreamers Do" on his 1989 album Secret Songs: Lennon & McCartney, in a similar style to the Beatles' original performance. Australian Beatles tribute band the Beatnix also covered it for their 1998 release It's Four You.

Seattle band Apple Jam covered this song on their 2009 album, Off the Beatle Track, in the style of "This Boy".

== Beatles version personnel ==
- Paul McCartney – vocals, bass guitar
- John Lennon – guitar
- George Harrison – guitar
- Pete Best – drums
