= The Fourmost =

English band

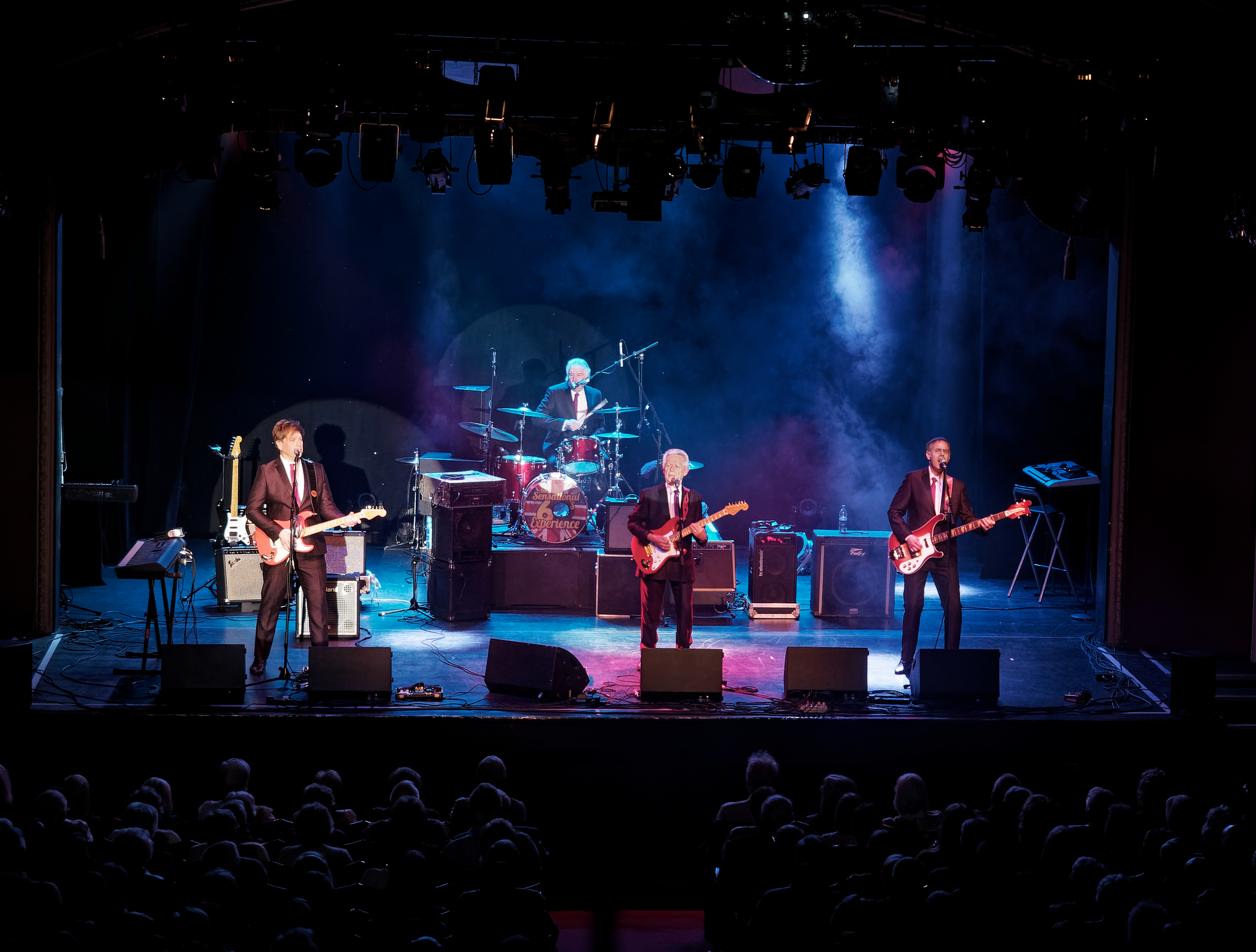
- Sensational 60s Experience Tour 2019

Background information
- Origin: Liverpool, England
- Genres: Beat, pop
- Years active: 1961–present
- Members: Kevin Clarkson; Des Thurlby; Lee Clarkson; Matt Johnson
- Past members: Brian O'Hara; Mike Millward; Billy Hatton; Dave Lovelady; Joey Bower; George Peckham
- Website: thefourmost.co.uk

The Fourmost are an English Merseybeat band that recorded in the 1960s. Their biggest UK hit single was "A Little Loving" in 1964. Three of their singles, including the first two, were cover versions of Lennon & McCartney songs.

== History ==
=== Formation ===
Guitarist/vocalist Brian O'Hara and best friend guitarist/vocalist Joey Bower (born Joseph Bower, 17 November 1939, Dingle, Liverpool, Lancashire) formed the Two Jays in 1957. The group changed its name to the Four Jays in September 1959 when bass guitarist/singer Billy Hatton and drummer Brian Redman (born 21 June 1941, Huyton, Liverpool, Lancashire) joined the group. The Four Jays played at the Cavern Club on 1 March 1961. Rhythm guitarist/singer Mike Millward (ex-the Undertakers) joined the Four Jays in November 1961, followed by drummer/singer Dave Lovelady in September 1962. The band changed its name to the Fourmost in October 1962. On 30 June 1963, the group signed a management contract with Brian Epstein. This led to their being auditioned by George Martin and signed to EMI's Parlophone record label.

=== Early years ===
With Epstein as their manager, the Fourmost had access to early Lennon–McCartney compositions. The Fourmost's first two singles were written by John Lennon. "Hello Little Girl", one of the earliest Lennon songs, was released on 30 August 1963 and reached No. 9 in the UK Singles Chart. Their follow-up single, "I'm in Love" (Lennon–McCartney), was released on 15 November 1963 and reached No. 17 in the UK. It was also notable as one of the earliest Beatles-penned songs to be released in the United States but, as with the Fourmost's other singles, it failed to chart there.

Their biggest hit followed. "A Little Loving", written by Russ Alquist, reached No. 6 in the UK Singles Chart in mid-1964. From then on, none of the group's singles cracked the Top 20 in the UK. "How Can I Tell Her" was followed by a cover version of the Four Tops' "Baby I Need Your Loving", sung by Millward, while Hatton took lead vocal on "Everything in the Garden" and "Girls Girls Girls" (first recorded by the Coasters and a hit for Elvis Presley). O'Hara composed most of their songs, which were used as B-sides including "Waitin' for You", "That's Only What They Say", "He Could Never", and "You Got That Way".

=== Peak years ===
On the group's only 1960s album, First and Fourmost, from September 1965, they covered Jackie DeShannon's, "Till You Say You'll Be Mine". Other tracks included "My Block" sung by Hatton and written by Jimmy Radcliffe, Carl Spencer and Bert Berns (originally a hit for the Chiffons in 1963), Millward sang a re-make of "The In Crowd", which featured the brass section from Sounds Incorporated, and Hatton sang cover versions of Little Richard's "The Girl Can't Help It" and "Heebie-Jeebies". The band appeared in the 1965 film Ferry Cross the Mersey and on the soundtrack album of the same name singing "I Love You Too" (which appeared in two differing versions from mono to stereo).

=== Personnel changes ===
In early 1966, the band was rocked by the sudden death of rhythm guitarist/vocalist Mike Millward from leukaemia. They recruited George Peckham as replacement. In August 1966, the Fourmost covered another Beatles song, "Here, There and Everywhere", followed by a cover of George Formby's "Auntie Maggie's Remedy" in November 1966. The latter song was representative of a comedic element to some of the group's recordings. Peckham wrote and sang the country-influenced "Turn the Lights Down Low" (the B-side of "Auntie Maggie's Remedy"), a short-lived effort to branch out to less pop-oriented fare.

In 1968, now on the CBS record label, they recorded "Apples, Peaches And Pumpkin Pie", an R&B hit by Jay & the Techniques, followed by "Rosetta" (suggested by Paul McCartney, who played piano on it), and "Easy Squeezy". The group soon stopped recording, and became popular on the cabaret circuit. Peckham left the band in 1969 to run a recording studio. Joey Bower returned to the band as replacement. A later private pressing album, The Fourmost – featuring O'Hara, Hatton, Lovelady and Bower – included covers such as "Without You", "I've Got You Under My Skin", "Rag Doll" and "Save the Last Dance for Me"; it was sold at their shows in 1975.

Hatton, Lovelady and Bower all left in 1980 while O'Hara continued the group with new members, although a version of the band featuring O'Hara with Hatton and Lovelady did once perform at the new Cavern Club. O'Hara eventually dropped out, selling the band's name. A later line-up featuring longtime bassist/singer Bill Haisman (who had been in the later group alongside O'Hara) plus John Richards (lead guitar, vocals), Gary Pearson (guitar, vocals) and Kevin Clarkson (drums, vocals) released a DVD and CD titled The Fourmost Live at The Club Tropicana, featuring a recording of a show in Skegness on 7 April 2007. They performed both "Hello Little Girl" and "A Little Loving" among other covers of 1950s, 1960s, and 1970s hit songs. Charley Records later issued a 20-track compilation album also titled First and Fourmost, while EMI Records later released a CD stereo/mono version of the original 1965 album in 1999. Brian O'Hara took his own life the same year. In 2005, they also released a 33-track CD compilation The Best of The Fourmost, which included the stereo version of "I Love You Too", and four previously unreleased songs with booklet notes written by Hatton.

In 2008, Hatton and Lovelady lost a court case to own the trademark on "The Fourmost" name, to the iteration of the band dating back to when they both left in 1978. In the following years afterwards, the two toured as "The Original Fourmost".

Hatton died in 2017.

In 2018, the Fourmost completed a 59-date theatre tour on the Sensational 60s Experience Tour along with other acts from that period.

== Original band members ==
- Brian O'Hara, born 12 March 1941, Dingle, Liverpool; died 27 June 1999, Wavertree, Liverpool (suicide), vocalist/lead guitarist
- Mike Millward, born Michael Millward, 9 May 1942, Bromborough, Cheshire; died 7 March 1966, at Clatterbridge Hospital, Bebington, Cheshire (leukemia) rhythm guitarist/vocalist
- Billy Hatton, born William Henry Hatton, 9 June 1941, Dingle, Liverpool; bassist/vocalist died 19 September 2017, Liverpool
- Dave Lovelady, born David Lovelady, 16 October 1942, Litherland, Liverpool, drummer/vocalist

== Discography ==
=== Albums ===
Year	Album	Chart positions		
Year	Album	UK	AU	US
1965	First and Fourmost	-	-	-
1975	The Fourmost	-	-	-

=== Singles ===
Year	Single	Chart positions		
Year	Single	UK	AUS	US
1963	"Hello Little Girl"	9	-	-
1963	"I'm in Love"	17	-	-
1964	"A Little Loving"	6	98	-
1964	"If You Cry" (US Only)	-	-	-
1964	"How Can I Tell Her"	33	-	-
1964	"Baby I Need Your Loving"	24	63	-
1965	"Everything in the Garden"	-	-	-
1965	"Girls Girls Girls"	33	21	-
1966	"Here, There and Everywhere"	-	-	120
1966	"Auntie Maggie's Remedy"	-	43	-
1968	"Apples, Peaches And Pumpkin Pie"	-	-	-
1968	"Rosetta"	-	-	-
1969	"Easy Squeezy"	-	-	-

== See also ==
- List of bands and artists from Merseyside
- List of performers on Top of the Pops
- List of artists who have covered The Beatles
