= I Don't Want to See You Again =

1964 single by Peter and Gordon

Single by Peter and Gordon
- B-side: "I Would Buy You Presents" (Asher/Waller)
- Released: 11 September 1964
- Recorded: August 1964
- Genre: Pop; soft rock
- Label: Columbia DB 7356 (UK); Capitol 5272 (U.S.)
- Songwriter(s): Lennon–McCartney
- Producer(s): John Burgess

Peter and Gordon singles chronology
| "Nobody I Know" (1964) | "I Don't Want to See You Again" (1964) | "I Go to Pieces" (1964) |

"I Don't Want to See You Again" is a song by Paul McCartney credited to Lennon–McCartney, that was released by Peter and Gordon in 1964 as a single. It failed to chart in the UK, but reached #16 on the Billboard Hot 100. In Canada it reached #17.

== Sources ==
- Unterberger, Richie (2006). The Unreleased Beatles: Music & Film. San Francisco, California: Backbeat Books. ISBN 978-0-87930-892-6.
