= Peter and Gordon =

British pop duo

- Peter and Gordon publicity photo, 1965

Background information
- Genre: Pop
- Years active: 1962–1968; 2005–2009
- Labels: Columbia (EMI); Capitol (US)
- Past members: Peter Asher; Gordon Waller

Peter and Gordon were a British pop duo, composed of Peter Asher (b. 1944) and Gordon Waller (1945–2009), who achieved international fame in 1964 with their first single, the million-selling "A World Without Love". The duo had several subsequent hits in America in the British Invasion era, including "I Go to Pieces", "Lady Godiva", "Woman", "True Love Ways", and "Nobody I Know".

== History ==
Peter Asher and his sister Jane were child actors in the 1950s. They played siblings in a 1955 episode of the television series The Adventures of Robin Hood. Jane dated Paul McCartney between 1963 and 1968, and Peter and Gordon recorded several songs written by McCartney but credited to Lennon–McCartney. Those hits included "A World Without Love" (US & UK No. 1), "Nobody I Know" (US No. 12; UK No. 10) and "I Don't Want to See You Again" (US No. 16, but not a hit in the UK).

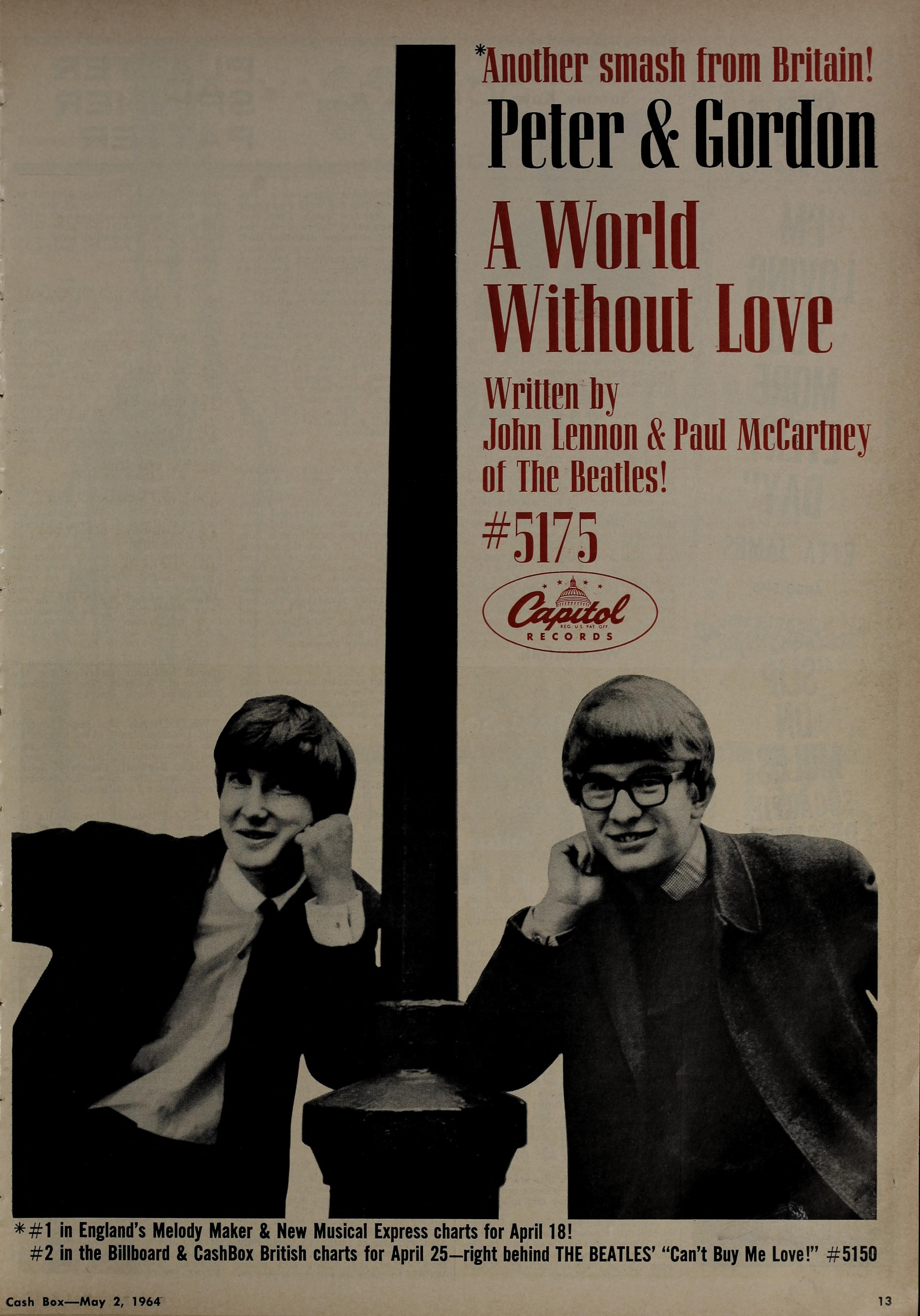
Cashbox advertisement, 2 May 1964

With "Woman" (1966: US No. 14, UK No. 28), McCartney used the pseudonym Bernard Webb to see if he could have a hit song without his name attached. First pressings of the US Capitol single listed the composer as "A. Smith". Peter and Gordon also recorded the John Lennon–penned Lennon–McCartney song "If I Fell", which was previously recorded by the Beatles and released on their 1964 album A Hard Day's Night.

Other hits for the duo included "I Go to Pieces" (US No. 9), written by Del Shannon and given to Peter and Gordon after the two acts toured together. The duo also recorded remakes of Buddy Holly's "True Love Ways" (1965: US No. 14, UK No. 2), and The Teddy Bears' "To Know Him Is To Love Him", retitled "To Know You Is To Love You" (1965: US No. 24, UK No. 5).

Peter and Gordon had their last hit in the UK in late 1966 with "Lady Godiva", which reached No. 16 there (and No. 6 in the US), whilst their success lasted into 1967 in the US, with "Knight in Rusty Armour" and "Sunday for Tea" both registering in the upper reaches of the Billboard Hot 100 that year.

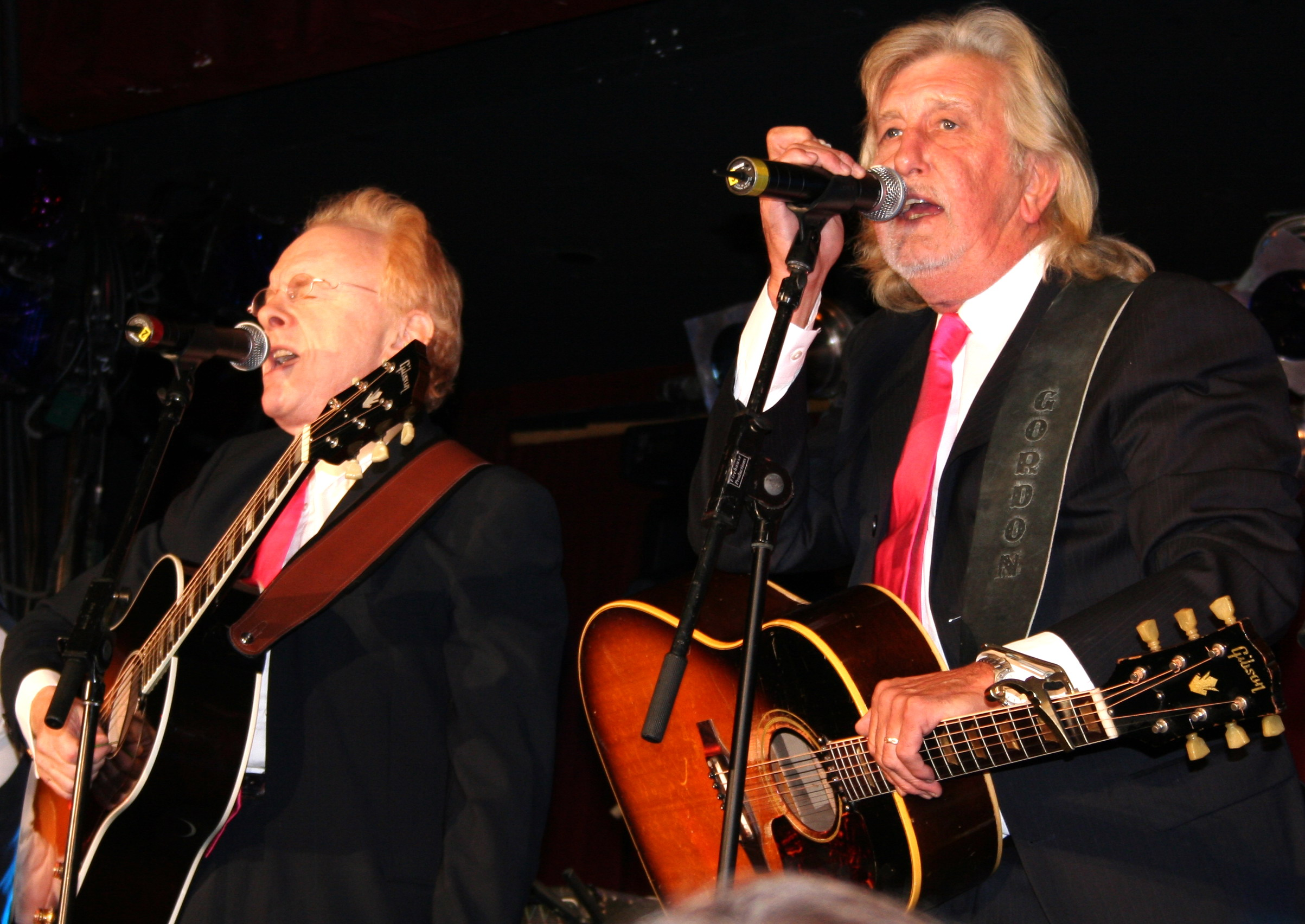
Peter and Gordon performing in 2005

Peter Asher subsequently became head of A&R for Apple Records. He continued his career as a recording executive in California, where he managed and produced Linda Ronstadt and James Taylor throughout the 1970s and 1980s. Asher also produced recordings for Cher, 10,000 Maniacs, and Diana Ross. His daughter, Victoria Asher, is a member of the alternative group Cobra Starship.

In August 2005, Peter and Gordon reunited onstage for the first time in more than 30 years, as part of two tribute concerts for Mike Smith of The Dave Clark Five in New York City. This was followed by full concerts at The Fest for Beatles Fans (formerly Beatlefest) conventions that began the following year. Paul McCartney heard about the reunion shows and sent a message to congratulate them on reuniting. Peter and Gordon told Palmiere at the Las Vegas Festival for Beatles Fans that they were to perform at the 2006 Adopt-A-Minefield show with Paul McCartney, who subsequently cancelled it because of his impending divorce from Heather Mills.

In the spring of 2007 and 2008, Peter and Gordon were featured performers in the EPCOT Flower Power concert series at Walt Disney World. Also in 2007, they performed as part of Love-In: A Musical Celebration, a tribute to the music of the 1960s, which was filmed at the Birch North Park Theatre in San Diego, California, and released on DVD in March 2009. On 21 August 2008, they performed a free concert on the pier in Santa Monica, California.

The pair played numerous times at the 50 Winters Later celebration, in February 2009, to commemorate the 50th anniversary of the death of Buddy Holly, Ritchie Valens and the Big Bopper. This was held in Clear Lake, Iowa, at the Surf Ballroom.

They subsequently performed in Chicago, New Jersey, and at the Festival for Beatles Fans convention in Las Vegas on 1 and 2 July 2009, where, according to a report by journalist Peter Palmiere for Beatlefan magazine, the pair were the performing highlight of the convention.

Gordon Waller died of a heart attack on 17 July 2009 in Ledyard, Connecticut, at the age of 64.

== Certifications ==
"A World Without Love", "Nobody I Know", "True Love Ways", and "Lady Godiva" each sold over one million copies, and were awarded gold discs.
