= A World Without Love =

1964 single by Peter and Gordon

- Norwegian picture sleeve

Single by Peter and Gordon

from the album A World Without Love
- B-side: "If I Were You"
- Released: 28 February 1964
- Recorded: 21 January 1964
- Studio: EMI, London
- Genre: Pop; soft rock
- Length: 2:44
- Label: Columbia, Capitol
- Songwriter: Lennon–McCartney
- Producer: Norman Newell

Peter and Gordon singles chronology
"A World Without Love" (1964)	"Nobody I Know" (1964)

"A World Without Love" is a song recorded by the British duo Peter and Gordon and released as their first single in February 1964. It was included on the duo's debut album in the UK, and in the US on an album of the same name. The song was written by Paul McCartney and attributed to Lennon–McCartney. The B-side was "If I Were You", written by Peter and Gordon.

In the United Kingdom, the song reached No. 1 on both the Record Retailer chart and the New Musical Express chart. In the United States, "A World Without Love" topped both the Billboard Hot 100 and the Cash Box Top 100. The song also reached No. 1 on the Irish Singles Chart, No. 1 on New Zealand's "Lever Hit Parade", No. 2 in Australia, and No. 8 on Norway's VG-lista.

"A World Without Love" is one of The Rock and Roll Hall of Fame's 500 Songs that Shaped Rock and Roll.

== Background ==
McCartney wrote the song when he was 16. McCartney described John Lennon's reaction to the song: "The funny first line always used to please John. 'Please lock me away –' 'Yes, okay.' End of song." Lennon said of the song that "I think that was resurrected from the past. ... I think he had that whole song before the Beatles. ... That has the line 'Please lock me away' that we always used to crack up at." As such, McCartney realized that the song was not going to be used by The Beatles. He instead offered it to fellow Merseybeat artist Billy J. Kramer, who declined.

Meanwhile, McCartney had become involved with the actress Jane Asher during 1963, and when he was in London he was invited to stay at the Asher household. Also there was her brother, Peter Asher, who asked McCartney if he could use the song after he and Gordon Waller had signed a recording contract as Peter and Gordon. McCartney agreed, but the song lacked a bridge; shortly before Peter and Gordon were due to record the song, McCartney came up with one ("So I wait and in a while ...").

Cash Box described the Peter and Gordon single as "a tantalizing, easy-beat thumper." The lead guitarist on this recording is studio musician Vic Flick who also played the guitar lick for the James Bond Theme.

Peter Asher first discussing the origins of "A World Without Love", and then some minutes later performing "A World Without Love", during a show in the United States in 2026

"A World Without Love" is one of two songs credited to Lennon–McCartney to reach number one in the US by an artist other than the Beatles. The other is "Lucy in the Sky with Diamonds" (which was recorded by the Beatles but not released as a single), reinterpreted by Elton John in 1974. "Bad to Me", written by Lennon and McCartney in 1963, was given to Billy J. Kramer and reached number 1 in the UK, but it failed to do so in the US. The song was one of the seven number ones credited to Lennon-McCartney that charted in the US in 1964, an all-time songwriting record for most songs to top the US charts in a calendar year.

The song was never released by the Beatles, and the only known recording of the song by any member of the Beatles is an informal personal recording of the song by McCartney, pre-bridge, which is now in the possession of Peter Asher. In January 2013, McCartney's recording was posted to YouTube. The clip was subsequently played during Peter Asher's concert appearances, which include his reflections on the various aspects of his career interspersed with his performances of key songs.

== Charts ==
=== Weekly charts ===
Chart (1964–1965)	Peak position
Argentina (CAPIF)	6
Australia (Kent Music Report)	2
Canada CHUM Chart	1
Finland (Suomen virallinen lista)	21
Ireland (IRMA)	1
New Zealand (Lever Hit Parade)	1
Norway (VG-lista)	8
UK (New Musical Express)	1
UK (Record Retailer)	1
US Billboard Hot 100	1
US Cash Box Top 100	1

=== Year-end charts ===
Chart (1964)	Rank
Australia	20
US Billboard Hot 100	30
US Cash Box Top 100	33

== Bobby Rydell version ==
A cover version by Bobby Rydell released in May 1964 was a strong regional hit in many markets. It reached No. 80 on the U.S. Billboard Hot 100 and No. 2 in a tandem ranking with the Peter and Gordon version on the Cash Box Top 100, before Rydell's name was dropped from the entry. In Canada, Rydell's version reached No. 9 co-charting with the Peter and Gordon version.

In his native Philadelphia the paired versions reached No. 1, while in the Pittsburgh market Rydell's version reached No. 4 to the exclusion of the Peter and Gordon original. In Chicago, Rydell's version reached No. 10 on the WLS "Silver Dollar Survey", in a tandem ranking with the Peter and Gordon version, while reaching No. 13 independently. Rydell's version also reached No. 5 in Singapore and No. 9 in Hong Kong.

== Other notable versions ==
In 1964, the Supremes released a version of the song on the album A Bit of Liverpool. Their version was a hit in some countries in Southeast Asia, reaching No. 7 in Malaysia. In 2001, Vonda Shepard's version appeared on a soundtrack for the television show Ally McBeal, being the first revival of the song in the new millennium.
