= Nobody I Know =

1964 song composed by Lennon–McCartney performed by Peter and Gordon

Single by Peter and Gordon
- B-side: "You Don't Have to Tell Me"
- Released: 29 May 1964
- Recorded: April 1964
- Genre: Pop; soft rock
- Label: Columbia DB7292 (UK); Capitol 5211 (US)
- Songwriter: Lennon–McCartney
- Producer: John Burgess

Peter and Gordon singles chronology
"A World Without Love" (1964)	"Nobody I Know" (1964)	"I Don't Want to See You Again" (1964)

Nobody I Know is a song written by Paul McCartney (attributed to Lennon–McCartney) which Peter and Gordon recorded in an April 1964 session at EMI Studios. Peter and Gordon had a UK and US #1 hit with the McCartney composition "A World Without Love" and McCartney wrote "Nobody I Know" with the specific intent of providing a follow-up hit for the duo. Billboard described the song as a "strong follow-up" to "A World Without Love." Cash Box described it as "a captivating uptempo romancer...that the twosome wraps up with loads of charm."

== Chart performance ==
"Nobody I Know" reached #9 in Canada, #10 UK, and #12 US.

== Cover versions ==
- A French rendering entitled "Partir, il nous faut" was recorded by Petula Clark and issued on a 1965 EP headed by her hit "Dans les temps".

== Sources ==
- Unterberger, Richie (2006). The Unreleased Beatles: Music & Film. San Francisco, California: Backbeat Books. ISBN 978-0-87930-892-6.
