= The Beatnix =

Australian Beatles tribute band

- Origin: Australia
- Genre: Rock
- Years active: 1980–present
- Website: https://www.beatnix.com.au/

The Beatnix is an Australian Beatles tribute band. It is amongst the longest running Beatles tribute shows in the world.

== History ==
The concept for the band was conceived and assembled in March 1980 by founding member Tony Dean as a live performance entity. Through the years, band membership has rolled over.

The Beatnix show includes fully authentic musical instruments similar to those used by the Beatles. These include guitars by Gretsch, Höfner, Rickenbacker and Gibson, Vox AC30 guitar amplifiers and a Vox AC50 bass amplifier with a T60 bass cabinet. The drums are identical to the ones used by Ringo Starr: a 1960s model Ludwig Black Oyster Pearl kit. They perform with a range of early period Beatle costumes, including Sgt Pepper's Lonely Hearts Club Band outfits.

The Beatnix Show has performed internationally with seasons in Hong Kong, Malaysia, Bangkok and New Zealand; and domestically from large venues (ARL Grand Final at the Stadium Australia 100,000+ people) to smaller bookings (50 people in a back garden setting in Surry Hills)

They have appeared in multiple television performances, including Hey Hey It's Saturday, The Midday Show, Good Morning Australia, The Don Lane Show, Ernie and Denise, Simon Townsend's Wonder World, Donnie Sutherlands' Sounds, and appearances at Beatles festivals in Adelaide, Melbourne, Auckland and four Beatlefests in Sydney.

The Beatnix have recorded songs for It's Four You (1994, Raven Records) a lost Beatles tracks album, Stairways to Heaven, The Money or the Gun album and numerous television and radio commercials including the Soothers ad, Arnetts Shapes, and Browns Chocolate. In print, they have appeared in an ad for Hertz.
