= Billy J. Kramer discography =

- Studio albums: 8
- EPs: 5
- Compilation albums: 13
- Singles: 36

This is the discography of English singer Billy J. Kramer, including his releases with the Dakotas.

== Albums ==
=== Studio albums ===
| Title | Album details | Peak chart positions | |
| Title | Album details | UK | US |
|---|---|---|---|
| Listen… | Released: October 1963; Label: Parlophone; Formats: LP, reel-to-reel | 11 | — |
| Little Children | Released: May 1964; Label: Imperial; Formats: LP; US-only release | — | 48 |
| I'll Keep You Satisfied | Released: August 1964; Label: Imperial; Formats: LP; US-only release | — | — |
| Trains and Boats and Planes | Released: August 1965; Label: Imperial; Formats: LP; US and Canada-only release | — | — |
| Kramer Versus Kramer | Released: October 1986; Label: Attack; Formats: LP; Solo release containing re-recordings | — | — |
| I Won the Fight | Released: 16 February 2014; Label: Self-released; Formats: CD, digital download; Solo release | — | — |
| Are You With Me? | Released: 7 June 2024; Label: Bootle Music; Formats: CD, digital download; Solo release | — | — |
"—" denotes releases that did not chart or were not released in that territory.

=== Compilation albums ===
| Title | Album details |
|---|---|
| Top Twelve Hits | Released: 5 October 1964; Label: Capitol; Formats: LP; Canada-only release |
| Billy Boy | Released: 1966; Label: Music for Pleasure; Formats: LP |
| The Best of Billy J. Kramer with the Dakotas | Released: August 1977; Label: EMI; Formats: LP, MC |
| The Best of Billy J. Kramer and the Dakotas | Released: August 1984; Label: Parlophone; Formats: LP, MC |
| The Best of the EMI Years | Released: 1991; Label: EMI; Formats: CD |
| The Definitive Collection | Released: 8 October 1991; Label: EMI; Formats: CD; US-only release |
| The EP Collection | Released: 19 June 1995; Label: See for Miles; Formats: CD |
| The Very Best of Billy J. Kramer and the Dakotas | Released: 14 July 1997; Label: Secret Society; Formats: CD |
| Billy J. Kramer with the Dakotas at Abbey Road 1963–1966 | Released: 23 February 1998; Label: EMI; Formats: CD |
| The Best of Billy J Kramer | Released: 1999; Label: Pegasus; Formats: CD |
| Do You Want to Know a Secret? The EMI Years 1963–1983 | Released: 16 February 2009; Label: EMI; Formats: 4xCD |
| Listen... / I'll Keep You Satisfied / Little Children / Trains and Boats and Trains | Released: May 2014; Label: BGO; Formats: 2xCD |

== EPs ==
| Title (Note: This is a list of EPs released in the UK. Various other EPs were released elsewhere.) | Album details | Peak chart positions |
| Title | Album details | UK |
|---|---|---|
| The Billy J. Kramer Hits | Released: October 1963; Label: Parlophone; Formats: 7" | 8 |
| I'll Keep You Satisfied | Released: April 1964; Label: Parlophone; Formats: 7" | — |
| Little Children | Released: May 1964; Label: Parlophone; Formats: 7" | — |
| From a Window | Released: November 1964; Label: Parlophone; Formats: 7" | — |
| Billy J. Plays the States | Released: February 1965; Label: Parlophone; Formats: 7" | — |
"—" denotes releases that did not chart.

== Singles ==
| Title (A-side / B-side) | Year | Peak chart positions | | | | | | | | | Label (UK / US) |
| Title (A-side / B-side) | Year | UK | AUS | CAN RPM CHUM | IRE | NOR | NZ | SWE | US | US AC | Label (UK / US) |
|---|---|---|---|---|---|---|---|---|---|---|---|
As Billy J. Kramer with the Dakotas
| "Do You Want to Know a Secret" b/w "I'll Be on My Way" | 1963 | 2 | 62 | — | 8 | 7 | 1 | 6 | — | — | Parlophone / Liberty |
| "Bad to Me" b/w "I Call Your Name" | 1963 | 1 | 18 | — | 3 | — | 1 | 7 | — | — | Parlophone / Liberty |
| "I'll Keep You Satisfied" b/w "I Know" | 1963 | 4 | 66 | — | — | — | 3 | — | — | — | Parlophone / Liberty |
| "Bad to Me" (US-only second release) b/w "Do You Want to Know a Secret" | 1964 | — | — | — | — | — | — | — | — | — | Liberty |
| "Little Children" b/w "They Remind Me of You" | 1964 | 1 | 10 | 12 | 2 | 9 | 1 | 8 | — | — | Parlophone |
| "Bad to Me" (US-only third release) b/w "Little Children" | 1964 | — | — | 12 | — | — | — | — | 9; 7 | — 6 | Imperial |
| "I'll Keep You Satisfied" (US-only re-release) b/w "I Know" | 1964 | — | — | — | — | — | — | — | 30 | — | Imperial |
| "From a Window" b/w "Second to None" (UK); "I'll Be on My Way" (US) | 1964 | 10 | 18 | 6 | — | — | — | 15 | 23 | — | Parlophone / Imperial |
| "It's Gotta Last Forever" b/w "Don't You Do It No More" (UK); "They Remind Me of You" (US) | 1965 | — | — | 43 | — | — | — | — | 67 | — | Parlophone / Imperial |
| "Trains and Boats and Planes" b/w "That's the Way I Feel" (UK); "I'll Be on My Way" (original US) | 1965 | 12 | 13 | 13 | — | — | — | — | 47 | 10 | Parlophone / Imperial |
| "Twilight Time" (US and Canada-only release) b/w "Irresistible You" (US); "The Twelfth of Never" (Canada) | 1965 | — | — | — | — | — | — | — | — | — | Imperial |
| "Neon City" b/w "I'll Be Doggone" | 1965 | — | — | — | — | — | — | — | — | — | Parlophone / Imperial |
| "We’re Doing Fine" b/w "Forgive Me" | 1966 | — | — | — | — | — | — | — | — | — | Parlophone |
| "You Make Me Feel Like Someone" b/w "Take My Hand" | 1966 | — | — | — | — | — | — | — | — | — | Parlophone / Imperial |
Billy J. Kramer solo singles
| "Town of Tuxley Toy Maker Part 1" b/w "Chinese Girl" (with the Dakotas) | 1967 | — | 91 | — | — | — | — | — | — | — | Reaction |
| "1941" b/w "His Love Is Just a Lie" | 1968 | 57 (Note: Chart position is from the official UK "Breakers List".) | — | — | — | — | — | — | — | — | NEMS / Epic |
| "A World Without Love" b/w "Take My Hand" | 1968 | — | — | — | — | — | — | — | — | — | NEMS |
| "Colour of My Love" b/w "I'm Running Away" | 1969 | — | — | — | — | — | — | — | — | — | MGM |
| "And the Grass Won't Pay No Mind" (as William Howard Ashton) b/w "There's No Time" | 1971 | — | — | — | — | — | — | — | — | — | Polydor |
| "A Fool Like You" b/w "I'll Keep You Satisfied" | 1973 | — | — | — | — | — | — | — | — | — | Decca |
| "Darling Come to Me" b/w "Walking" | 1973 | — | — | — | — | — | — | — | — | — | Decca |
| "Stayin' Power" b/w "Blue Jean Queen" | 1974 | — | — | — | — | — | — | — | — | — | BASF |
| "San Diego" b/w "Warm Summer Rain" | 1977 | — | — | — | — | — | — | — | — | — | EMI |
| "Ships That Pass in the Night" b/w "Is There Any More at Home Like You" | 1978 | — | — | — | — | — | — | — | — | — | EMI |
| "Blue Christmas" (limited release) b/w "Little Love" | 1979 | — | — | — | — | — | — | — | — | — | Hobo |
| "Silver Dream" b/w "Lonely Lady" | 1980 | — | — | — | — | — | — | — | — | — | JM |
| "Sun Tan" b/w "Gone Away" | 1981 | — | — | — | — | — | — | — | — | — | JM |
| "Rock It" b/w "Dum Dum" | 1982 | — | — | — | — | — | — | — | — | — | Runaway |
| "You're Right, I'm Wrong" b/w "The Fugitive" | 1982 | — | — | — | — | — | — | — | — | — | Runaway |
| "You Can't Live on Memories" b/w "Stood Up" | 1983 | — | — | — | — | — | — | — | — | — | RAK |
| "Shootin' the Breeze" b/w "Doris Day Movie" | 1984 | — | — | — | — | — | — | — | — | — | Mean |
| "Jealous Hearts" b/w "Loose Change" | 1986 | — | — | — | — | — | — | — | — | — | Attack |
| "Are You with Me?" | 2024 | — | — | — | — | — | — | — | — | — | Bootle Music |
| "I Couldn't Have Done It Without You" | 2024 | — | — | — | — | — | — | — | — | — | Bootle Music |
| "My Sweet Rose" | 2024 | — | — | — | — | — | — | — | — | — | Bootle Music |
"—" denotes releases that did not chart or were not released in that territory.
