= Produced by George Martin =

2011 documentary film directed by Frank Hanly

Box set by George Martin
- Released: 17 July 2001
- Recorded: 1950–1997
- Genre: Various
- Label: Parlophone (UK); Capitol (United States)
- Producer: George Martin

George Martin chronology
In My Life (1998)	Produced by George Martin (2001)	Produced by George Martin (single CD) (2006)

Professional ratings
Review scores
Source	Rating
AllMusic	4/5 stars

Produced by George Martin is a 2001 various artists compilation box set of tracks produced by Sir George Martin. It is also the title of a documentary film on George Martin co-produced by the BBC's Arena team and released in 2012 by Eagle Rock Entertainment on DVD and Blu-ray.

The audio box set was issued to commemorate Martin's 50-year career as a record producer. The recordings are not in chronological order but are instead grouped together by common themes.

A single CD compilation with highlights from this collection was released on 6 November 2006.

The film documentary was first aired by the BBC in the United Kingdom on 25 April 2011. It combines rare archive footage and new interviews with, among others, Paul McCartney, Ringo Starr, Jeff Beck, Cilla Black and Giles Martin. The DVD and Blu-ray was released worldwide on 10 September 2012 and includes over 50 minutes of out-takes and bonus interview footage from Rick Rubin, T-Bone Burnett and Ken Scott.

== Track listing ==
=== Disc One (Crazy Rhythms) ===
1. "Pickin' A Chicken" – Eve Boswell with Glenn Somers & His Orchestra
2. "I Got it Bad And That Ain't Good" – Cleo Laine with Johnny Dankworth & His Orchestra
3. "Hayfoot, Strawfoot" – The Kenny Baker Quartet 1953
4. "High Society" – Graeme Bell's Australian Jazz Band
5. "Princess Elizabeth of England" – The Luton Girls' Choir with the Band of The Irish Guards
6. "Romanza" – Roberto Inglez & His Orchestra
7. "Melody on the Move" – Tommy Reilly with the Vic Hammett Quartet
8. "Ae Fond Kiss" – Kenneth McKellar
9. "Bluebell Polka" – Jimmy Shand & His Band
10. "Scottish Polka" – Mickie Ainsworth & Jimmy Blue
11. "Dashing White Sergeant" – The Glasgow Phoenix Choir
12. "Arriverderci Darling" – Edna Savage and the Nuffield Centre Chorus
13. "Away in a Manger" – Kirkintilloch Junior Choir with Joan Summers and Moira Anderson
14. "Robin Hood" – Dick James with Stephen James & His Chorus, and Ron Goodwin's Orchestra
15. "Portrait of My Love" – Matt Monro 1960
16. "Won't You Come Home, Bill Bailey" – Freddy Randall & His Band
17. "Experiments With Mice" – Johnny Dankworth & His Orchestra
18. "Oi! Oi! Oi!" – Joe Daniels & His Band and the Butlins Campers
19. "Saturday Jump" – Humphrey Lyttelton & His Band
20. "Crazy Rhythm" – Max Geldray with Wally Stott & His Orchestra
21. "My Kind of Girl" – Matt Monro 1961
22. "Hi"-Flutin' Boogie – John Scott
23. "Earth Angel" (Will You Be Mine?) – The Southlanders with Philip Green & His Orchestra 1955
24. "Don't You Rock Me Daddy-O" – The Vipers Skiffle Group 1956
25. "Skiffling Strings" – Ron Goodwin & His Concert Orchestra
26. "Be My Girl" – Jim Dale
27. "No Other Baby" – The Vipers 1958
28. "Sun Arise" – Rolf Harris 1962
29. "You're Driving Me Crazy" – The Temperance Seven with Paul McDowell

=== Disc Two (Transports of Delights) ===
1. "The Q5 Piano Tune" – Spike Milligan
2. "Unchained Melody" – Peter Sellers
3. "Mock Mozart" – Peter Ustinov and Anthony Hopkins 1953
4. "A Transport of Delight" – Flanders and Swann 1960
5. "Nellie the Elephant" – Mandy Miller
6. "Little Red Monkey" – Joy Nichols, Jimmy Edwards & Dick Bentley
7. "Goodness Gracious Me" – Peter Sellers & Sophia Loren 1960
8. "The Wormwood Scrubs Tango" – Spike Milligan 1962
9. "The Hippopotamus Song" – Ian Wallace and Donald Swann
10. "Any Old Iron" – Peter Sellers and the Mate's Spoffle Group with Fred Spoons 1957
11. "The Hole in the Ground" – Bernard Cribbins
12. "Aftermyth of War" – Beyond The Fringe Cast
13. "All The Things You Are" – Peter Sellers 1958
14. "The Horse Show" – Michael Bentine
15. "The End of the World" – Beyond The Fringe Cast
16. "My Boomerang Won't Come Back" – Charlie Drake
17. "A Drop of the Hard Stuff" – Peter Sellers 1958
18. "You Gotta Go Oww!" – Spike Milligan, Count Jimmy Moriarty, Graveley Stephens and the Massed Alberts
19. "Morse Code Melody" – The Alberts with Professor Bruce Lacey and Vox Humana
20. "I've Lost My Mummy" – Rolf Harris 1963
21. "My Brother" – Terry Scott
22. "Judge Not" – Cambridge Circus Cast
23. "The Gas Man Cometh" – Flanders and Swann 1964
24. "Right Said Fred" – Bernard Cribbins
25. "Football Results" – Michael Bentine
26. "Jake The Peg" – Rolf Harris 1966
27. "The Highway Code" – The Master Singers
28. "A Hard Day's Night" – Peter Sellers 1965
29. "She Loves You" – Peter Sellers 1965

=== Disc Three (That Was the Decade That Was) ===
1. "Please Please Me" – The Beatles 1963
2. "How Do You Do It?" – Gerry & The Pacemakers 1963
3. "Do You Want to Know a Secret" – Billy J. Kramer with The Dakotas 1963
4. "Hello Little Girl" – The Fourmost 1963
5. "I Want to Hold Your Hand" – The Beatles 1963
6. "The Cruel Sea" – The Dakotas 1963
7. "That Was the Week That Was" – Millicent Martin with David Frost 1963
8. "Bad to Me" – Billy J. Kramer with The Dakotas 1963
9. "Anyone Who Had a Heart" – Cilla Black 1964
10. "Don't Let the Sun Catch You Crying" – Gerry & The Pacemakers 1964
11. "I'll Keep You Satisfied" – Billy J. Kramer with The Dakotas 1963
12. "A Little Lovin'" – The Fourmost 1964
13. "Little Children" – Billy J. Kramer with The Dakotas 1964
14. "You're My World (Il Mio Mondo)" – Cilla Black 1964
15. "Yesterday" – The Beatles 1965
16. "You'll Never Walk Alone" – Gerry & The Pacemakers 1963
17. "I (Who Have Nothing)" – Shirley Bassey 1963
18. "In the Summer of His Years" – Millicent Martin 1963
19. "It's for You" – Cilla Black 1964
20. "It's You" – Alma Cogan with Stan Foster & His Orchestra 1964
21. "Ferry Cross the Mersey" – Gerry & The Pacemakers 1964
22. "Can't Buy Me Love" – Ella Fitzgerald 1964
23. "I've Been Wrong Before" – Cilla Black 1965
24. "In My Life" – The Beatles 1965
25. "Land of a Thousand Dances" – The Action 1965
26. "Alfie" – Cilla Black 1966
27. "Michelle" – David and Jonathan 1966
28. "Step Inside Love" – Cilla Black 1968
29. "She's Leaving Home" – David and Jonathan 1967
30. "When I'm Sixty-Four" – Bernard Cribbins 1967
31. "Time" – Cilla Black 1967

=== Disc Four (Gold Fingers) ===
1. "Coronation Scot" – Sidney Torch & His Orchestra (from Paul Temple)
2. "Chopin: Prelude in C Minor, Op. 28 No. 20" – Sidney Harrison (piano)
3. "Mozart: Serenade in E flat major, K. 375, Fourth Movement" – London Baroque Ensemble
4. "Mozart: Serenade in E flat major, K. 375, Fifth Movement" – London Baroque Ensemble
5. "The Lark Ascending" – London Philharmonic Orchestra
6. "Barwick Green" – Sidney Torch & His Orchestra (from The Archers)
7. "The White Suit Samba" – Jack Parnell & His Rhythm 1952
8. "Time Beat" – Ray Cathode
9. "Theme from Limelight" – Ron Goodwin & His Orchestra
10. "Elizabethan Serenade (Where the Gentle Avon Flows)" – Ron Goodwin & His Orchestra
11. "Murder She Says" – Ron Goodwin & His Orchestra (from Murder She Said)
12. "I Like Money" – Nadia Gray (from Mr. Topaze)
13. "Double Scotch" – Ron Goodwin & His Orchestra
14. "No One Will Ever Know" – Matt Monro 1961
15. "The Dr. Kildare Theme" – Johnnie Spence and his Orchestra 1961
16. "Ringo's Theme (This Boy)" – The George Martin Orchestra 1964
17. "633 Squadron Theme" – Ron Goodwin & His Orchestra 1964
18. "From Russia with Love" – Matt Monro 1963
19. "All Quiet on the Mersey Front" – The George Martin Orchestra
20. "Goldfinger" – Shirley Bassey 1964
21. "By George! It's The David Frost Theme" – The George Martin Orchestra
22. "Love in the Open Air" – The George Martin Orchestra (from The Family Way) 1967
23. "Thingumybob" – The George Martin Orchestra 1968
24. "Theme One" – The George Martin Orchestra
25. "Snakes Alive" – The George Martin Orchestra (from Live and Let Die)
26. "The Ticlaw Anthem" – The George Martin Orchestra (from Honky Tonk Freeway)
27. "Where Eagles Dare" – Ron Goodwin (from Where Eagles Dare) 1968

=== Disc Five (Smiles of the Beyond) ===
1. "Marrakesh Express" – Stan Getz 1969
2. "Icarus" – Paul Winter 1973
3. "Marblehead Messenger" – Seatrain
4. "Sans Souci" – John Williams 1973
5. "Live and Let Die" – Paul McCartney & Wings 1973
6. "Juniper Bear" – Paul Winter and Winter Consort 1973
7. "The Smile of the Beyond" – John McLaughlin & The Mahavishnu Orchestra 1974
8. "Tin Man" – America 1974
9. "Pinafore Days" – Stackridge
10. "Sunday" – Cleo Laine 1976
11. "Diamond Dust" – Jeff Beck 1975
12. "Sister Golden Hair" – America 1975
13. "The Moon Is a Harsh Mistress" – Jimmy Webb 1977
14. "Amarillo" – Neil Sedaka 1971
15. "Get Back" – Billy Preston 1970
16. "The Highwayman" – Jimmy Webb 1977
17. "No More Fear of Flying" – Gary Brooker 1979
18. "World's Greatest Lover" – Cheap Trick 1980

=== Disc Six (Nice Work) ===
1. "Ebony and Ivory" – Paul McCartney and Stevie Wonder 1982
2. "Hymn" – Ultravox 1982
3. "Say Say Say" – Paul McCartney and Michael Jackson 1983
4. "Our Perfect Song" – Kenny Rogers 1985
5. "No More Lonely Nights" – Paul McCartney 1984
6. "I Love You, Samantha" – The King's Singers 1990
7. "Love Dust" – Mary Hopkin and Freddie Jones 1988
8. "Mr Waldo, Come and Sweep My Chimbley" – Tom Jones 1988
9. "Memory" – José Carreras 1990
10. "Pinball Wizard" – Tommy Cast 1993
11. "Nice Work If You Can Get It" – Larry Adler featuring Sting 1994
12. "My Man's Gone Now" – Larry Adler featuring Sinéad O'Connor 1994
13. "Rhapsody in Blue" – Larry Adler featuring George Martin 1994
14. "Summertime" – Larry Adler featuring Peter Gabriel 1994
15. "The Pepperland Suite" – George Martin 1998
16. "Here, There and Everywhere" – Celine Dion 1998
17. "Friends and Lovers" – George Martin 1998

== Single CD Track listing ==
1. "Theme One" · The George Martin Orchestra · 2.31
2. "I Want to Hold Your Hand" · The Beatles · 2.26
3. "Anyone Who Had a Heart" · Cilla Black · 2.51
4. "Ferry Cross The Mersey" · Gerry & The Pacemakers · 2.24
5. "Do You Want to Know a Secret" · Billy J Kramer & The Dakotas · 2.03
6. "Live and Let Die" · Paul McCartney & Wings · 3.12
7. "Goldfinger" · Shirley Bassey · 2.49
8. "She's Leaving Home" · David and Jonathan · 3.14
9. "Portrait of My Love" · Matt Monro · 2.46
10. "Elizabethan Serenade (Where the Gentle Avon Flows)" · Ron Goodwin & His Orchestra · 2.53
11. "A Hard Day's Night" · Peter Sellers · 1.49
12. "Melody on the Move" · Tommy Reilly · 2.50
13. "Wormwood Scrubs Tango" · Spike Milligan & Orchestra · 2.33
14. "Goodness Gracious Me" · Peter Sellers & Sophia Loren · 3.00
15. "A Transport of Delight" · Flanders & Swann · 2.23
16. "The Pepperland Suite" · George Martin · 6.18
17. "From Russia with Love" · Matt Monro · 2.35
18. "Alfie" · Cilla Black · 2.39
19. "Get Back" · Billy Preston · 3.00
20. "Mr. Waldo, Come and Sweep My Chimbley" · Tom Jones · 2.58
21. "Tin Man" · America · 3.29
22. "Diamond Dust" · Jeff Beck · 8.21
23. "Here, There and Everywhere" · Celine Dion · 3.17
24. "Friends and Lovers" · George Martin · 2.25
