= List of NME number-one singles of the 1960s =

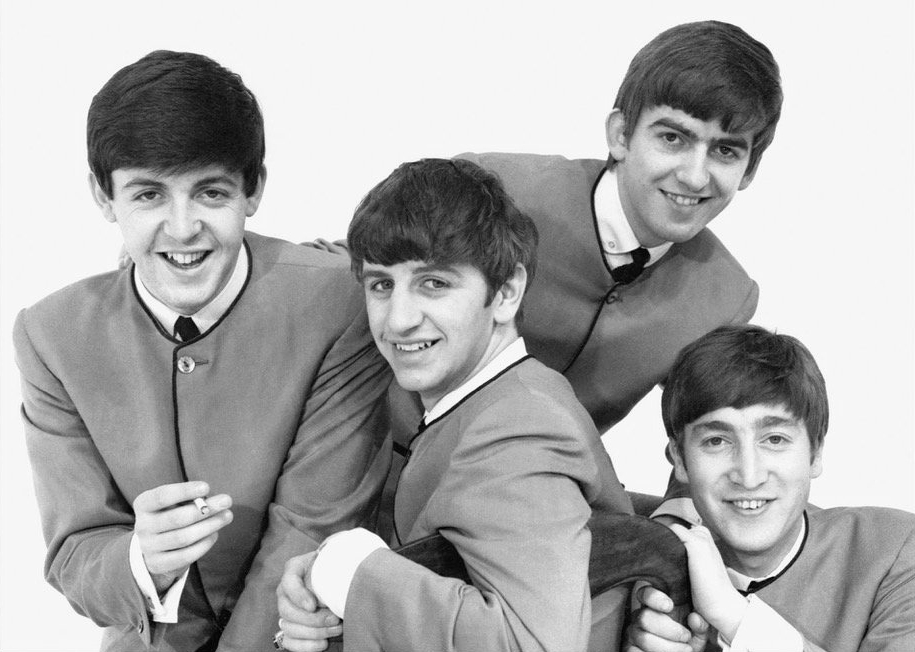
The Beatles had eighteen number-one singles on the NME chart, only one of which never topped the Record Retailer chart.

The NME (or New Musical Express) was a British weekly popular music newspaper. Record charts in the United Kingdom began on 14 November 1952 when NME imitated an idea started in American Billboard magazine and compiled their own hit parade. Until 15 February 1969, when the British Market Research Bureau (BMRB) chart was established, many periodicals compiled their own charts. During this time the BBC used aggregated results of the prominent NME, Melody Maker, Disc, Record Mirror and, later, Record Retailer charts to compile their Pick of the Pops chart. Prior to 1969 there was no universally accepted source or "official" singles chart; however, the Official Charts Company and Guinness' British Hit Singles & Albums regard the canonical sources for this period as NME before 10 March 1960 and Record Retailer from then until the BMRB took over in 1969. Although Record Retailer is now the most predominantly used source for charting music in the 1960s, NME had the biggest circulation of charts in the decade and was more widely followed. After the BMRB was formed, the NME continued compiling its own chart up until 14 May 1988.

The Allisons' entry for the Eurovision Song Contest, entitled "Are You Sure?", was the first single to be number one on the NME chart but not to reach the top spot on Record Retailer's chart. In total, sixteen songs failed to reach number one with Record Retailer but topped the NME chart. In 1969, after the BMRB chart was introduced, four songs topped the NME but not the BMRB chart. Notable discrepancies include "19th Nervous Breakdown", which reached number one for the Rolling Stones on the NME, Disc, and Melody Maker charts, topped the BBC's Pick of the Pops aggregated chart and was announced as number one on Top of the Pops; however, because it did not reach number one on the Record Retailer chart, it is omitted from the Official Charts Company's canon. The Beatles' "Please Please Me" suffered the same fate so, arguably, should be considered the Beatles' first number-one single. Conversely, Elvis Presley's double A-side, "Rock-A-Hula Baby"/"Can't Help Falling in Love", reached number one on all charts except NME because the entries were split by NME according to which song was requested when the shop returned its figures.

== Number-one singles ==
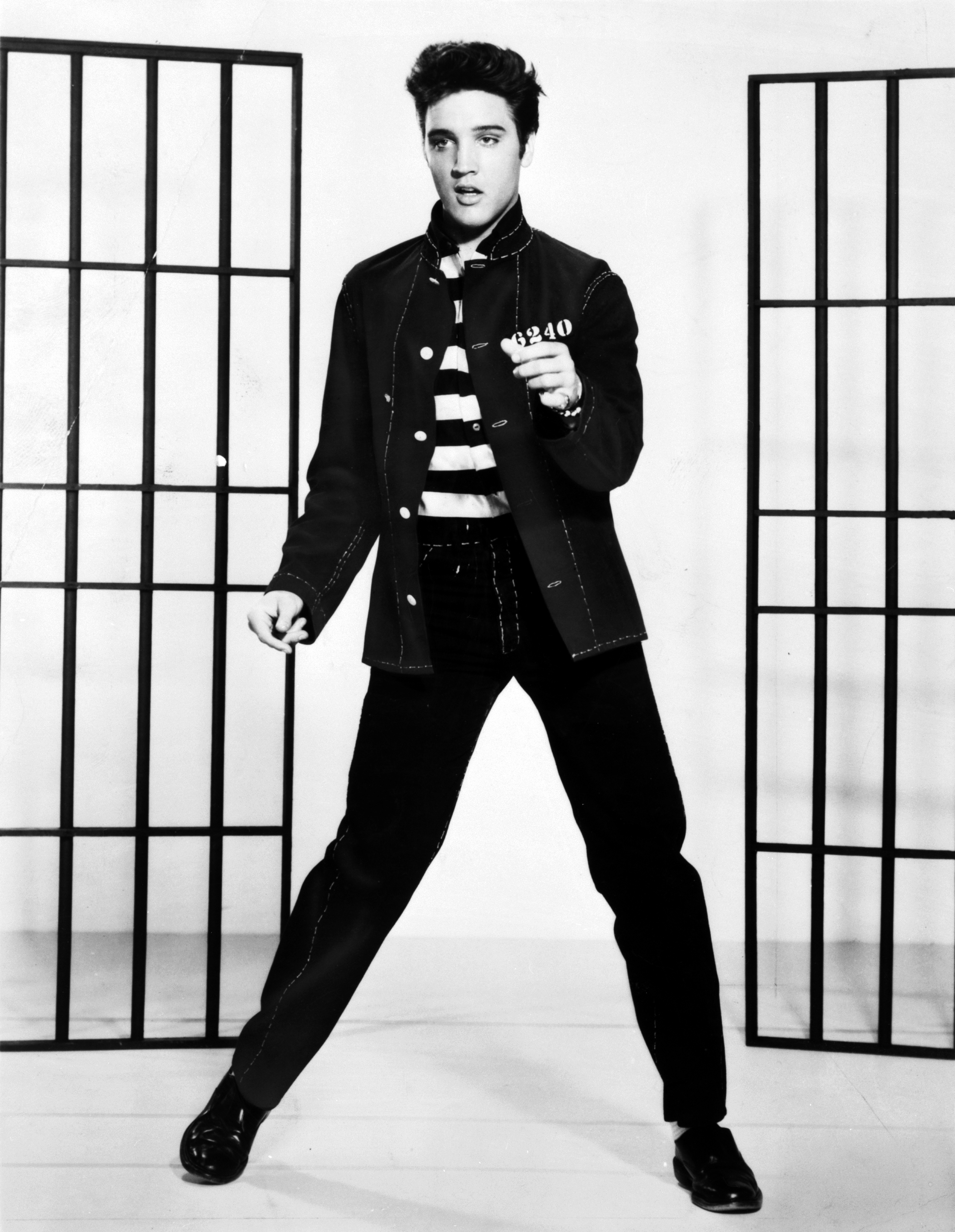
Elvis Presley had eleven number-one singles on the NME chart, including two not recognised by The Official Charts Company.

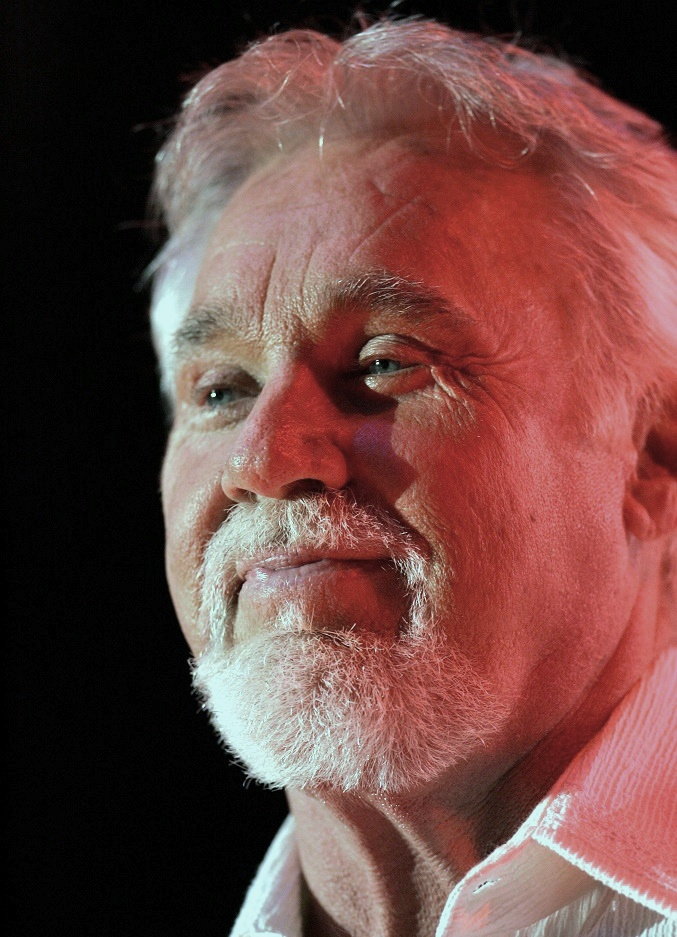
Kenny Rogers' first number-one single on the NME chart came over seven years before he reached the top of Record Retailer's chart.

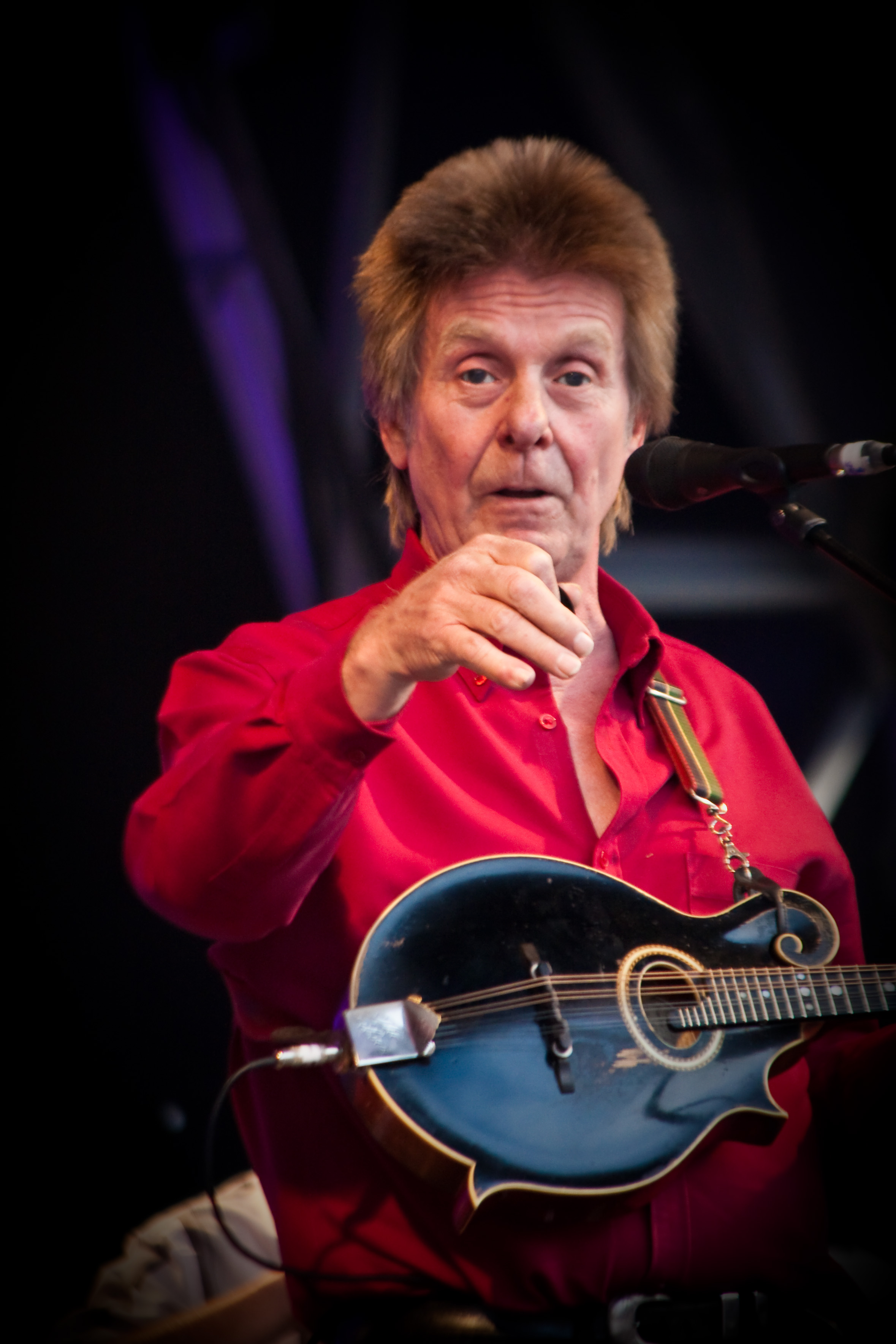
Joe Brown said the decision to favour the Record Retailer chart "has deprived [him] of [his] only number one".

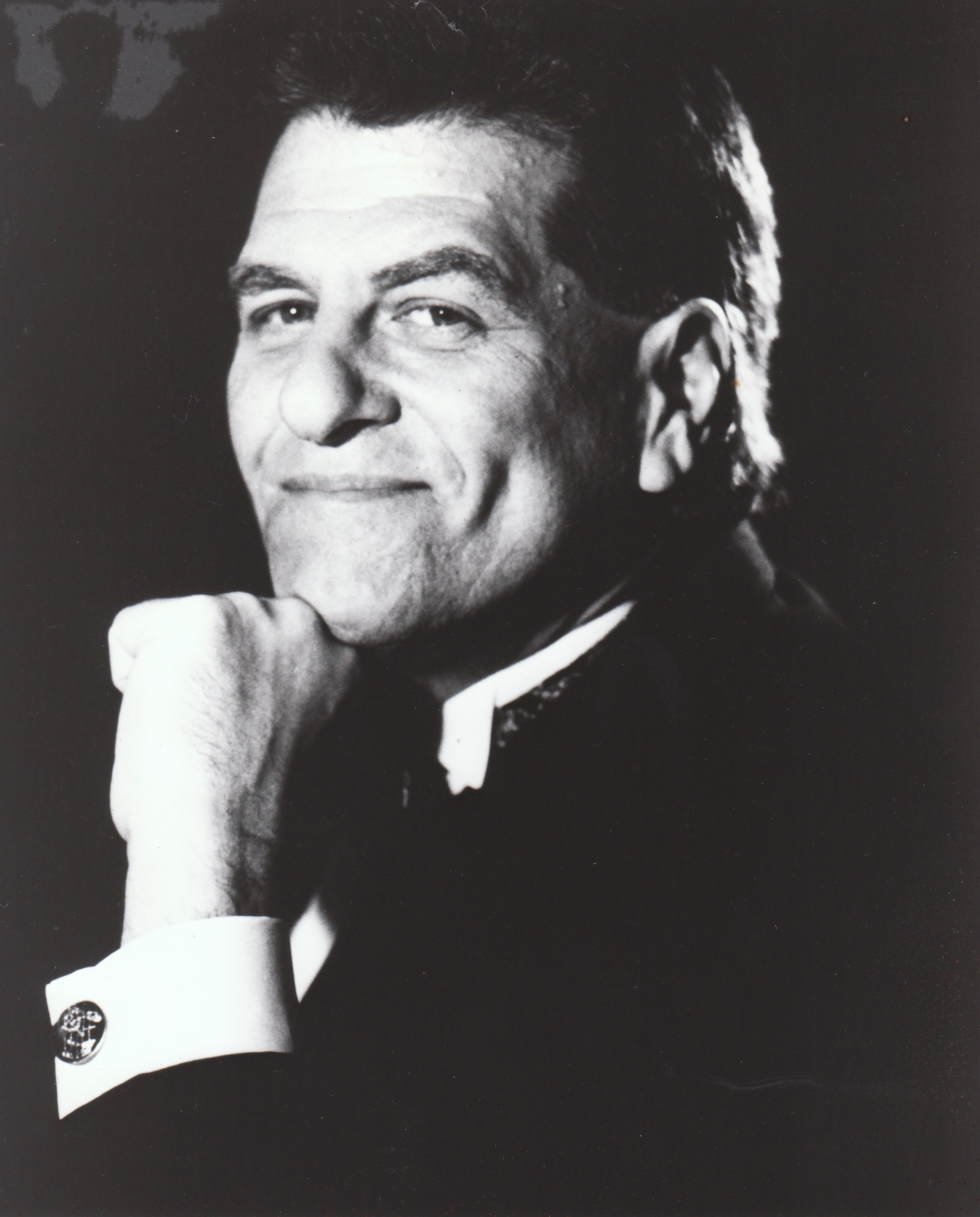
Len Barry's only number-one single was on the NME chart with "1-2-3".

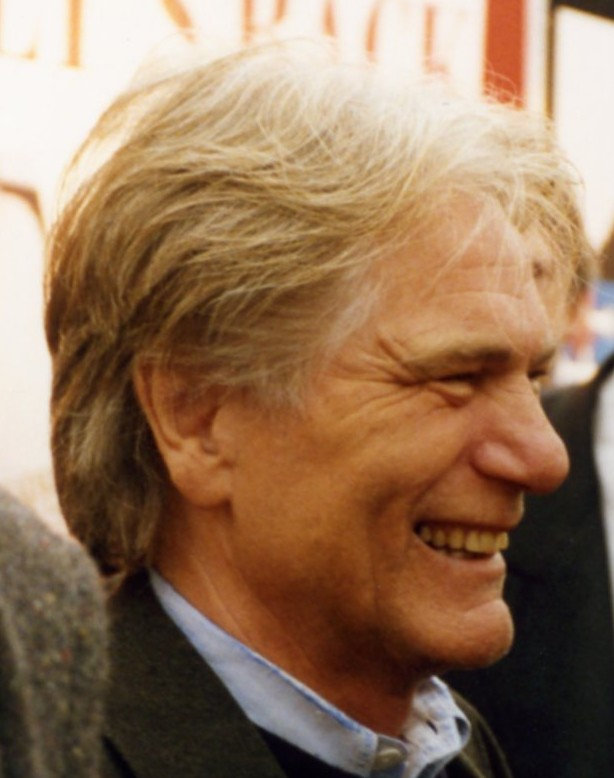
Adam Faith's "Poor Me" was the last number-one single for which NME is considered the canonical source.

Key
Italics	Prior to 10 March 1960 the NME is considered by the Official Charts Company as the canonical source.
†	The song did not reach number one on the Record Retailer chart which is considered by the Official Charts Company as the canonical source until 15 February 1969.
‡	The song did not reach number one on the BMRB chart which is considered as the official chart after 15 February 1969.
[nb #]	The song spent a week at number one, where it shared the top spot with another song.

No.	Artist (Note: The names, singles, week-ending dates and duration at number one are from NME.)	Single	Reached number one	Weeks at number one
1960
94	Emile Ford and the Checkmates	"What Do You Want to Make Those Eyes at Me For?"	18 December 1959	6
95	Michael Holliday	"Starry Eyed"	29 January 1960	1
96	Anthony Newley	"Why"	5 February 1960	4
97	Adam Faith	"Poor Me"	4 March 1960	2
98	Johnny Preston	"Running Bear"	18 March 1960	1
99	Lonnie Donegan	"My Old Man's a Dustman"	25 March 1960	4
100	Anthony Newley	"Do You Mind?"	22 April 1960	1
101	The Everly Brothers	"Cathy's Clown"	29 April 1960	9
102	Jimmy Jones	"Good Timin'"	1 July 1960	3
103	Cliff Richard and The Shadows	"Please Don't Tease"	22 July 1960	4
104	The Shadows	"Apache"	19 August 1960	6
105	Ricky Valance	"Tell Laura I Love Her"	30 September 1960	2
106	Roy Orbison	"Only the Lonely (Know How I Feel)"	14 October 1960	3
107	Elvis Presley	"It's Now or Never"	4 November 1960	9
1961
108	Johnny Tillotson	"Poetry in Motion"	6 January 1961	3
109	Elvis Presley	"Are You Lonesome Tonight?"	27 January 1961	5
110	The Everly Brothers	"Walk Right Back"	3 March 1961	3
111	Elvis Presley	"Wooden Heart"	24 March 1961	2
112	The Allisons	"Are You Sure?" †	7 April 1961	1
re	Elvis Presley	"Wooden Heart"	14 April 1961	1
re	The Allisons	"Are You Sure?" †	21 April 1961	1
113	The Temperance Seven	"You're Driving Me Crazy"	28 April 1961	1
114	The Marcels	"Blue Moon"	5 May 1961	2
115	Del Shannon	"Runaway"	19 May 1961	1
116	Elvis Presley	"Surrender"	26 May 1961	4
re	Del Shannon	"Runaway"	23 June 1961	3
117	The Everly Brothers	"Temptation"	14 July 1961	1
118	Eden Kane	"Well I Ask You"	21 July 1961	2
119	Helen Shapiro	"You Don't Know"	4 August 1961	3
120	John Leyton	"Johnny Remember Me"	25 August 1961	4 (Note: John Leyton's "Johnny Remember Me" and Helen Shapiro's "You Don't Know" were classified jointly as number one on 1 September 1961. The following week "Johnny Remember Me" reclaimed the number-one spot outright.)
re	Helen Shapiro	"You Don't Know"	1 September 1961	1
121	Elvis Presley	"Wild in the Country" †	22 September 1961	1
re	John Leyton	"Johnny Remember Me"	29 September 1961	1
122	The Highwaymen	"Michael (Row the Boat)"	6 October 1961	1
123	Helen Shapiro	"Walkin' Back to Happiness"	13 October 1961	4
124	Elvis Presley	"His Latest Flame"	10 November 1961	3
125	Frankie Vaughan	"Tower of Strength"	1 December 1961	4 (Note: Frankie Vaughan's "Tower of Strength" and Bobby Vee's "Take Good Care of My Baby" were classified jointly as number one on 1 December 1961. For the following three weeks "Tower of Strength" claimed the number-one spot outright.)
126	Bobby Vee	"Take Good Care of My Baby" †	1 December 1961	1
127	Danny Williams	"Moon River"	29 December 1961	1
1962
128	Acker Bilk	"Stranger on the Shore" †	6 January 1962	1
129	Cliff Richard	"The Young Ones"	13 January 1962	6
130	Chubby Checker	"Let's Twist Again" †	24 February 1962	2
131	Kenny Ball and his Jazzmen	"March of the Siamese Children" †	10 March 1962	1
132	The Shadows	"Wonderful Land"	17 March 1962	9 (Note: The Shadows's "Wonderful Land" and B. Bumble and the Stingers's "Nut Rocker" were classified jointly as number one on 12 May 1962. The following week neither reclaimed the number-one spot.)
133	B. Bumble and the Stingers	"Nut Rocker"	12 May 1962	1
134	Elvis Presley	"Good Luck Charm"	19 May 1962	5
135	Mike Sarne with Wendy Richard	"Come Outside"	23 June 1962	2
136	Joe Brown and the Bruvvers	"A Picture of You" †	7 July 1962	1
137	Ray Charles	"I Can't Stop Loving You"	14 July 1962	1
138	Frank Ifield	"I Remember You"	21 July 1962	8
139	Elvis Presley	"She's Not You"	15 September 1962	3
140	The Tornados	"Telstar"	6 October 1962	5
141	Frank Ifield	"Lovesick Blues"	10 November 1962	5
142	Elvis Presley	"Return to Sender"	15 December 1962	2
143	Cliff Richard and The Shadows	"The Next Time" / "Bachelor Boy"	29 December 1962	1
1963
144	The Shadows	"Dance On!"	5 January 1963	3
145	Jet Harris and Tony Meehan	"Diamonds"	26 January 1963	4
146	Frank Ifield	"The Wayward Wind"	23 February 1963	1 (Note: Frank Ifield's "The Wayward Wind" and The Beatles' "Please Please Me" were classified jointly as number one on 23 February 1963. The following week The Beatles claimed the number-one spot outright.)
147	The Beatles	"Please Please Me" †	23 February 1963	2
148	Cliff Richard and The Shadows	"Summer Holiday"	9 March 1963	3
149	The Shadows	"Foot Tapper"	30 March 1963	1
150	Gerry & The Pacemakers	"How Do You Do It?"	6 April 1963	3
151	The Beatles	"From Me to You"	27 April 1963	6 (Note: The Beatles' "From Me to You" and Billy J. Kramer & The Dakotas' "Do You Want to Know a Secret" were classified jointly as number one on 1 June 1963. The previous week "From Me to You" had been the number-one spot outright, and the following week "Do You Want to Know a Secret" claimed the number-one spot individually.)
152	Billy J. Kramer & The Dakotas	"Do You Want to Know a Secret" †	1 June 1963	2
153	Gerry & The Pacemakers	"I Like It"	15 June 1963	4
154	Frank Ifield	"Confessin' (That I Love You)"	13 July 1963	3
155	The Searchers	"Sweets for My Sweet"	3 August 1963	3
156	Billy J. Kramer & The Dakotas	"Bad to Me"	24 August 1963	2
157	The Beatles	"She Loves You"	7 September 1963	4
158	Brian Poole and The Tremeloes	"Do You Love Me"	5 October 1963	3
159	Gerry & The Pacemakers	"You'll Never Walk Alone"	26 October 1963	4
re	The Beatles	"She Loves You"	23 November 1963	2
160	The Beatles	"I Want to Hold Your Hand"	7 December 1963	6
1964
161	The Dave Clark Five	"Glad All Over"	18 January 1964	2
162	The Searchers	"Needles and Pins"	1 February 1964	3
163	Cilla Black	"Anyone Who Had a Heart"	22 February 1964	4
164	Billy J. Kramer & The Dakotas	"Little Children"	21 March 1964	1
165	The Beatles	"Can't Buy Me Love"	28 March 1964	4
166	Peter & Gordon	"A World Without Love"	25 April 1964	2
167	The Searchers	"Don't Throw Your Love Away"	9 May 1964	1
168	The Four Pennies	"Juliet"	16 May 1964	2
169	Cilla Black	"You're My World (Il Mio Mondo)"	30 May 1964	3
170	Roy Orbison	"It's Over"	20 June 1964	2
171	The Animals	"House of the Rising Sun"	4 July 1964	2
172	The Beatles	"A Hard Day's Night"	18 July 1964	4
173	Manfred Mann	"Do Wah Diddy Diddy"	15 August 1964	2
174	The Honeycombs	"Have I the Right?"	29 August 1964	2
175	The Kinks	"You Really Got Me"	12 September 1964	1
176	Herman's Hermits	"I'm Into Something Good"	19 September 1964	3
177	Roy Orbison	"Oh, Pretty Woman"	10 October 1964	3
178	Sandie Shaw	"(There's) Always Something There to Remind Me"	31 October 1964	2
179	The Supremes	"Baby Love"	14 November 1964	1
180	The Rolling Stones	"Little Red Rooster"	21 November 1964	2
181	The Beatles	"I Feel Fine"	5 December 1964	6
1965
182	Georgie Fame	"Yeh Yeh"	16 January 1965	1
183	The Moody Blues	"Go Now"	23 January 1965	2
184	The Righteous Brothers	"You've Lost That Lovin' Feelin'"	6 February 1965	1
185	The Kinks	"Tired of Waiting for You"	13 February 1965	1
186	The Seekers	"I'll Never Find Another You"	20 February 1965	2
187	Tom Jones	"It's Not Unusual"	6 March 1965	1
188	The Rolling Stones	"The Last Time"	13 March 1965	4
189	The Yardbirds	"For Your Love" †	10 April 1965	1 (Note: The Yardbirds' "For Your Love" and Cliff Richard's "The Minute You're Gone" were classified jointly as number one on 10 April 1965. The next week neither song reclaimed the number-one spot.)
190	Cliff Richard	"The Minute You're Gone"	10 April 1965	1
191	The Beatles	"Ticket to Ride"	17 April 1965	5
192	Jackie Trent	"Where Are You Now (My Love)"	22 May 1965	1
193	Sandie Shaw	"Long Live Love"	29 May 1965	2
194	The Everly Brothers	"The Price of Love" †	12 June 1965	1
195	Elvis Presley	"Crying in the Chapel"	19 June 1965	2
196	The Hollies	"I'm Alive"	3 July 1965	2
197	The Byrds	"Mr. Tambourine Man"	17 July 1965	2
198	The Beatles	"Help!"	31 July 1965	4
199	Sonny & Cher	"I Got You Babe"	28 August 1965	1
200	The Rolling Stones	"(I Can't Get No) Satisfaction"	4 September 1965	3
201	Ken Dodd	"Tears"	25 September 1965	6
202	The Rolling Stones	"Get Off of My Cloud"	6 November 1965	3
203	Len Barry	"1-2-3" †	27 November 1965	1
204	The Seekers	"The Carnival Is Over"	4 December 1965	1
205	The Beatles	"Day Tripper" / "We Can Work It Out"	11 December 1965	5
1966
206	The Spencer Davis Group	"Keep On Running"	15 January 1966	3
207	The Overlanders	"Michelle"	5 February 1966	1
208	Nancy Sinatra	"These Boots Are Made for Walkin'"	12 February 1966	1
209	The Rolling Stones	"19th Nervous Breakdown" †	19 February 1966	3
210	The Hollies	"I Can't Let Go" †	12 March 1966	2 (Note: The Hollies' "I Can't Let Go" and The Walker Brothers' "The Sun Ain't Gonna Shine Anymore" were classified jointly as number one on 19 March 1966. The previous week The Hollies had been number one outright and The Walker Brothers held the number-one spot individually for the following three weeks.)
211	The Walker Brothers	"The Sun Ain't Gonna Shine Anymore"	19 March 1966	4
212	The Spencer Davis Group	"Somebody Help Me"	16 April 1966	1
213	Dusty Springfield	"You Don't Have to Say You Love Me"	23 April 1966	2
214	Manfred Mann	"Pretty Flamingo"	7 May 1966	3
215	The Rolling Stones	"Paint It, Black"	28 May 1966	1
216	Frank Sinatra	"Strangers in the Night"	4 June 1966	3
217	The Beatles	"Paperback Writer"	25 June 1966	2
218	The Kinks	"Sunny Afternoon"	9 July 1966	2
219	Chris Farlowe	"Out of Time"	23 July 1966	2
220	The Troggs	"With a Girl Like You"	6 August 1966	2
221	The Beatles	"Yellow Submarine" / "Eleanor Rigby"	20 August 1966	4
222	Small Faces	"All or Nothing"	17 September 1966	1
223	Jim Reeves	"Distant Drums"	24 September 1966	5
224	Four Tops	"Reach Out I'll Be There"	29 October 1966	3
225	The Beach Boys	"Good Vibrations"	19 November 1966	2
226	Tom Jones	"Green, Green Grass of Home"	3 December 1966	7
1967
227	The Monkees	"I'm a Believer"	21 January 1967	4
228	Petula Clark	"This Is My Song"	18 February 1967	2
229	Engelbert Humperdinck	"Release Me"	4 March 1967	6
230	Nancy Sinatra and Frank Sinatra	"Somethin' Stupid"	15 April 1967	1
231	Sandie Shaw	"Puppet on a String"	22 April 1967	4
232	The Tremeloes	"Silence Is Golden"	20 May 1967	3
233	Procol Harum	"A Whiter Shade of Pale"	10 June 1967	5
234	The Beatles	"All You Need Is Love"	15 July 1967	4
235	Scott McKenzie	"San Francisco (Be Sure to Wear Flowers in Your Hair)"	12 August 1967	4
236	Engelbert Humperdinck	"The Last Waltz"	9 September 1967	6
237	Bee Gees	"Massachusetts"	21 October 1967	3
238	The Foundations	"Baby Now That I've Found You"	11 November 1967	3
239	Long John Baldry	"Let the Heartaches Begin"	2 December 1967	1
240	The Beatles	"Hello, Goodbye"	9 December 1967	6
1968
241	Georgie Fame	"The Ballad of Bonnie and Clyde"	20 January 1968	1
242	Love Affair	"Everlasting Love"	27 January 1968	3
243	Manfred Mann	"Mighty Quinn"	17 February 1968	2
244	Esther and Abi Ofarim	"Cinderella Rockefella"	2 March 1968	4
245	The Beatles	"Lady Madonna"	30 March 1968	2
246	Cliff Richard	"Congratulations"	13 April 1968	1
247	Louis Armstrong	"What a Wonderful World"	20 April 1968	4
248	Gary Puckett & The Union Gap	"Young Girl"	18 May 1968	5
249	The Rolling Stones	"Jumpin' Jack Flash"	22 June 1968	2
250	The Equals	"Baby Come Back"	6 July 1968	3
251	Tommy James and the Shondells	"Mony Mony"	27 July 1968	4
252	Tom Jones	"Help Yourself" †	24 August 1968	2
253	Bee Gees	"I've Gotta Get a Message to You"	7 September 1968	1
254	The Beatles	"Hey Jude"	14 September 1968	3
255	Mary Hopkin	"Those Were the Days"	5 October 1968	5
256	Joe Cocker	"With a Little Help from My Friends"	9 November 1968	1
257	Hugo Montenegro	"The Good, the Bad and the Ugly"	16 November 1968	1
258	Barry Ryan	"Eloise" †	23 November 1968	2
259	The Scaffold	"Lily the Pink"	7 December 1968	5
1969
260	Marmalade	"Ob-La-Di, Ob-La-Da"	11 January 1969	2
261	Fleetwood Mac	"Albatross"	25 January 1969	3
262	The Move	"Blackberry Way"	15 February 1969	1
263	Amen Corner	"(If Paradise Is) Half as Nice"	22 February 1969	1
264	Peter Sarstedt	"Where Do You Go To (My Lovely)?"	1 March 1969	4
265	Marvin Gaye	"I Heard It Through the Grapevine"	29 March 1969	3
266	Desmond Dekker & The Aces	"Israelites"	19 April 1969	2
267	The Beatles with Billy Preston	"Get Back"	3 May 1969	5
268	Tommy Roe	"Dizzy"	7 June 1969	2
269	The Beatles	"The Ballad of John and Yoko"	21 June 1969	2
270	Thunderclap Newman	"Something in the Air"	5 July 1969	2
271	Elvis Presley	"In the Ghetto" ‡	19 July 1969	1
272	The Rolling Stones	"Honky Tonk Women"	26 July 1969	5
273	Zager and Evans	"In The Year 2525 (Exordium and Terminus)"	30 August 1969	3
274	Creedence Clearwater Revival	"Bad Moon Rising"	20 September 1969	3
275	Bobbie Gentry	"I'll Never Fall in Love Again"	11 October 1969	3
276	The Archies	"Sugar, Sugar"	1 November 1969	2
277	Fleetwood Mac	"Oh Well" ‡	15 November 1969	1
re	The Archies	"Sugar, Sugar"	22 November 1969	2
278	Stevie Wonder	"Yester-Me, Yester-You, Yesterday" ‡	6 December 1969	1
279	Kenny Rogers and The First Edition	"Ruby, Don't Take Your Love to Town" ‡	13 December 1969	1
280	Rolf Harris	"Two Little Boys"	20 December 1969	6
