= Little Children =

Little Children may refer to:

- Little Children (novel), by Tom Perrotta
  - Little Children (film), based on the novel
  - Little Children (soundtrack), the official soundtrack of the film
- "Little Children" (song), a 1964 hit for Billy J. Kramer
  - Little Children (album), the album containing it
- "Little Children", a song from the eponymous album Brian Wilson
