= 2006 Los Angeles Film Critics Association Awards =

Annual US film awards ceremony

32nd LAFCA Awards
- Date: December 2006

Highlights
- Best Picture: Letters from Iwo Jima

The 32nd Los Angeles Film Critics Association Awards, given by the Los Angeles Film Critics Association (LAFCA), honored the best in film for 2006.

== Winners ==
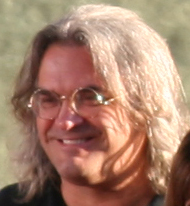
Paul Greengrass, Best Director winner

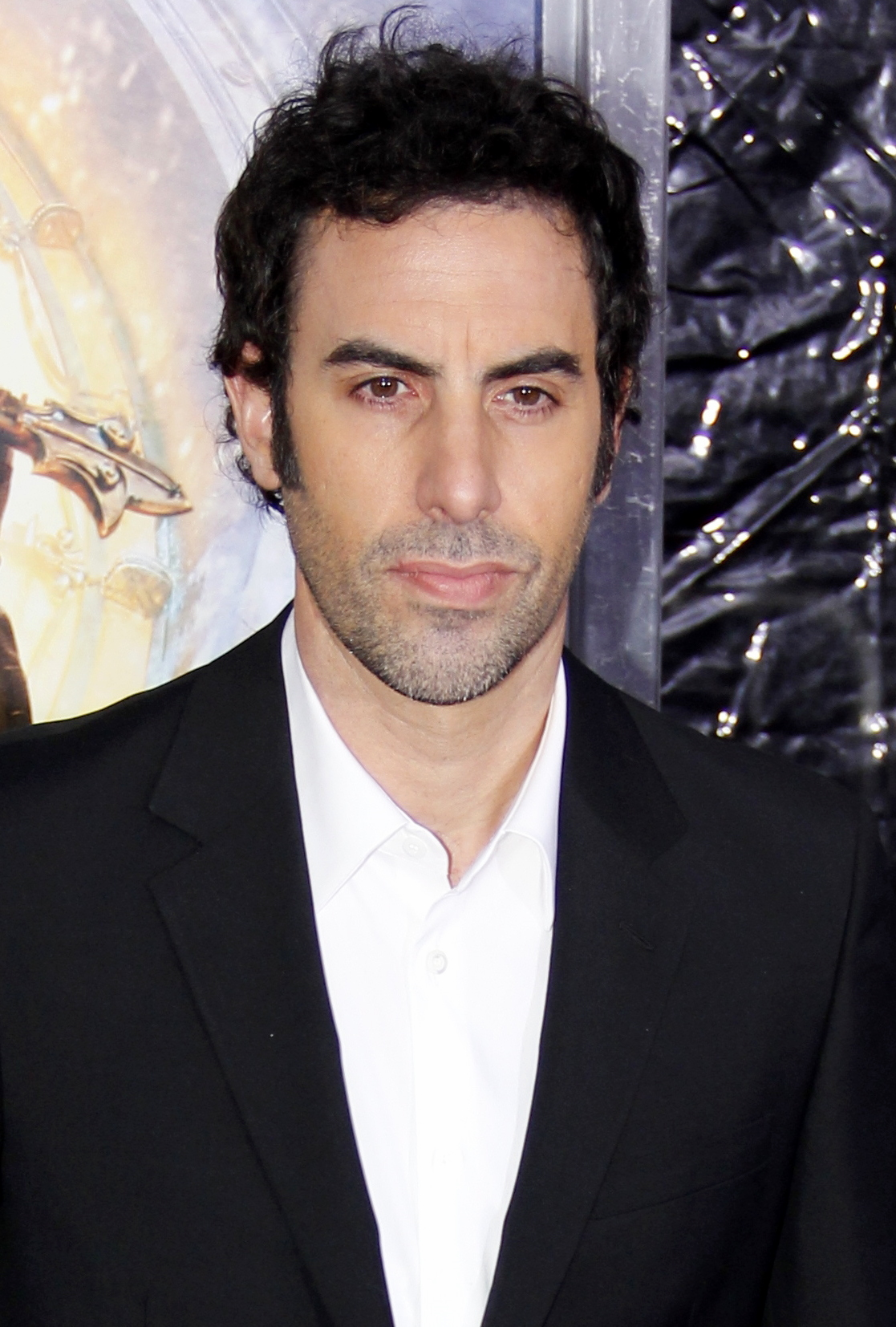
Sacha Baron Cohen, Best Actor co-winner

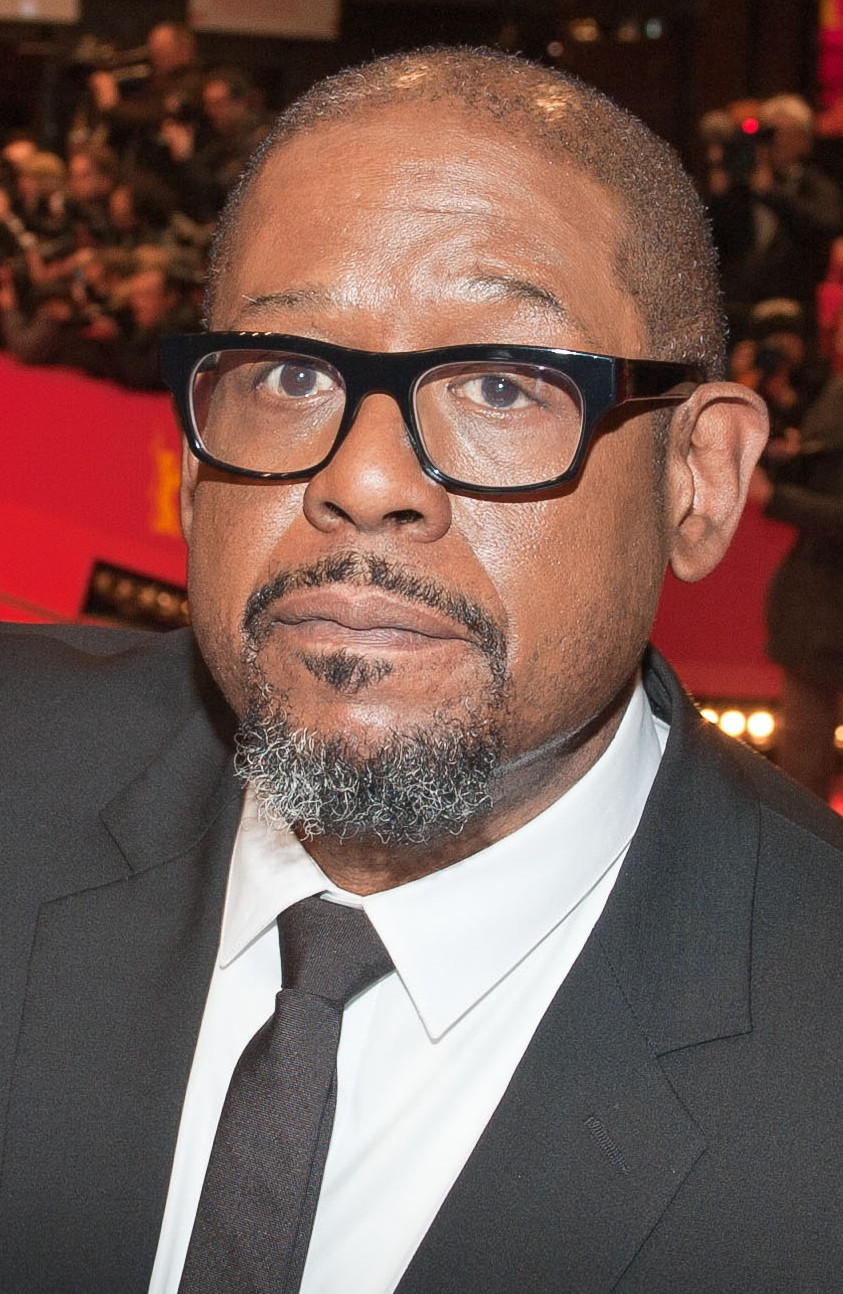
Forest Whitaker, Best Actor co-winner

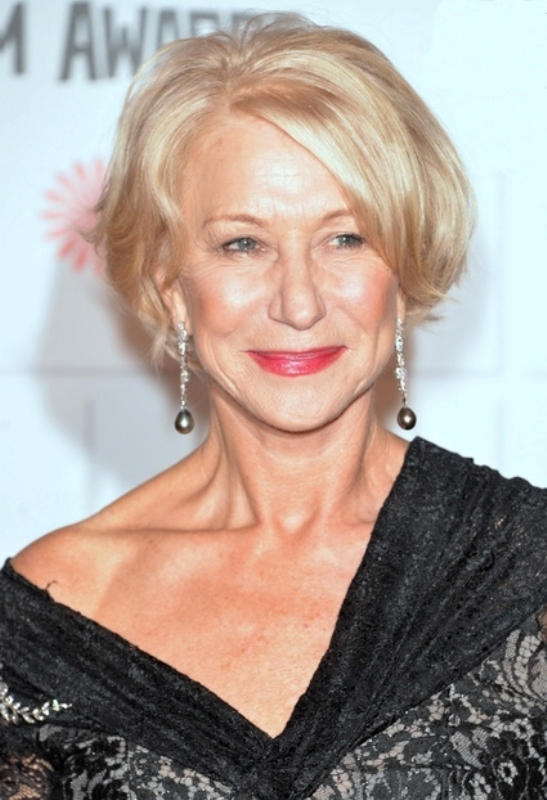
Helen Mirren, Best Actress winner

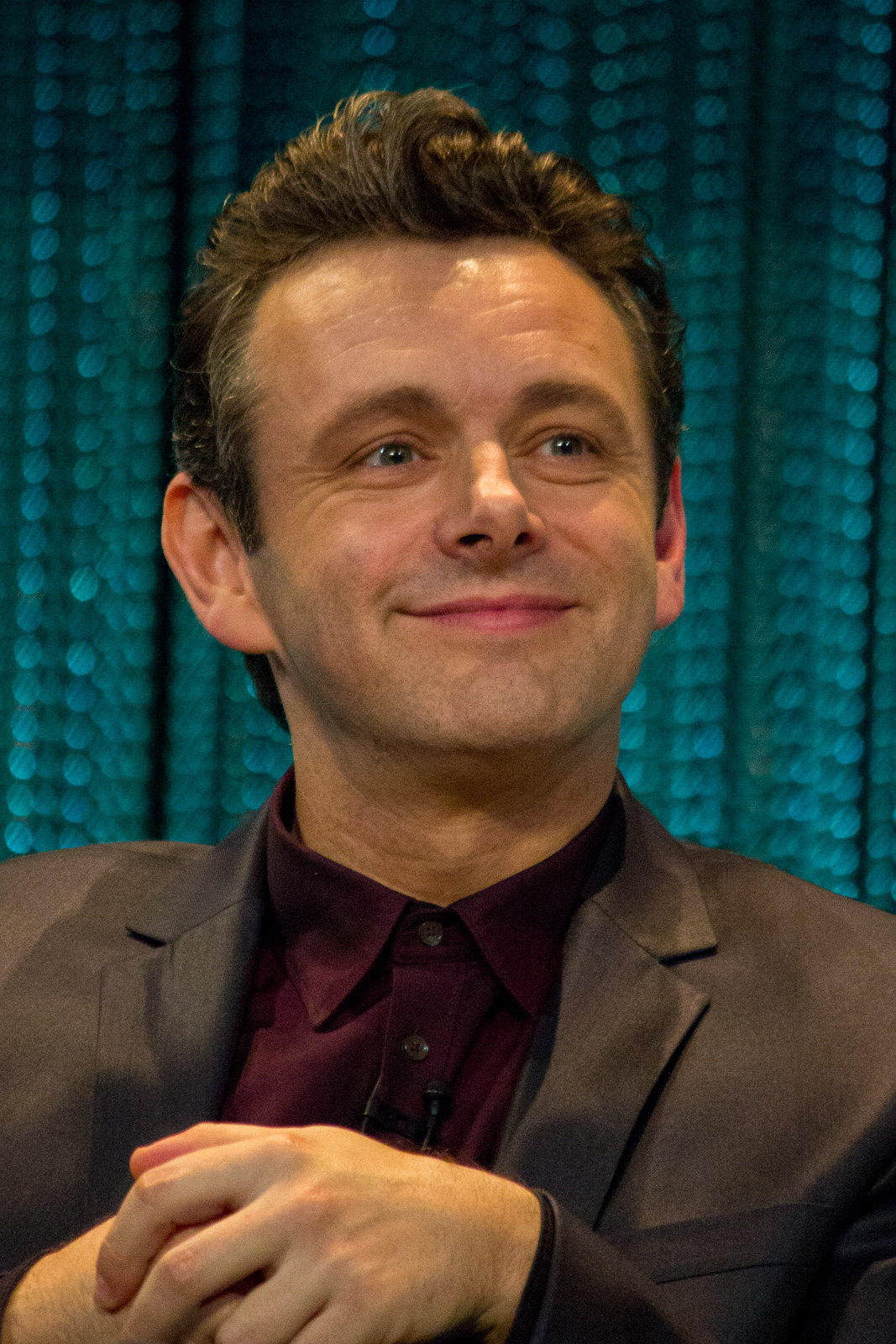
Michael Sheen, Best Supporting Actor winner

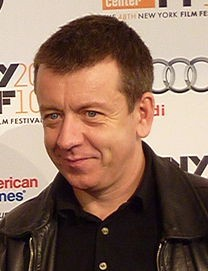
Peter Morgan, Best Screenplay winner

- Best Picture:
  - Letters from Iwo Jima
  - Runner-up: The Queen
- Best Director:
  - Paul Greengrass – United 93
  - Runner-up: Clint Eastwood – Flags of Our Fathers and Letters from Iwo Jima
- Best Actor (TIE):
  - Sacha Baron Cohen – Borat: Cultural Learnings of America for Make Benefit Glorious Nation of Kazakhstan
  - Forest Whitaker – The Last King of Scotland
- Best Actress:
  - Helen Mirren – The Queen
  - Runner-up: Penélope Cruz – Volver
- Best Supporting Actor:
  - Michael Sheen – The Queen
  - Runner-up: Sergi López – Pan's Labyrinth (El laberinto del fauno)
- Best Supporting Actress:
  - Luminița Gheorghiu – The Death of Mr. Lazarescu (Moartea domnului Lăzărescu)
  - Runner-up: Jennifer Hudson – Dreamgirls
- Best Screenplay:
  - Peter Morgan – The Queen
  - Runner-up: Michael Arndt – Little Miss Sunshine
- Best Cinematography:
  - Emmanuel Lubezki – Children of Men
  - Runner-up: Tom Stern – Flags of Our Fathers and Letters from Iwo Jima
- Best Production Design:
  - Eugenio Caballero – Pan's Labyrinth (El laberinto del fauno)
  - Runner-up: Jim Clay, Veronica Falzon, and Geoffrey Kirkland – Children of Men
- Best Music Score:
  - Alexandre Desplat – The Painted Veil and The Queen
  - Runner-up: Thomas Newman – The Good German and Little Children
- Best Foreign-Language Film:
  - The Lives of Others (Das Leben der Anderen) • Germany
  - Runner-up: Volver • Spain
- Best Documentary/Non-Fiction Film:
  - An Inconvenient Truth
  - Runner-up: Darwin's Nightmare
- Best Animation:
  - Happy Feet
  - Runner-up: Cars
- The Douglas Edwards Experimental/Independent Film/Video Award:
  - So Yong Kim – In Between Days
  - Kelly Reichardt – Old Joy
- New Generation Award:
  - Michael Arndt (screenwriter), Jonathan Dayton and Valerie Faris (co-directors) – Little Miss Sunshine
- Career Achievement Award:
  - Robert Mulligan
- Special Citation:
  - Jean-Pierre Melville's 1969 film Army of Shadows upon the occasion of its long-overdue U.S. release.
  - Jonas Mekas for his contributions to American film culture as a filmmaker, critic and co-founder of Anthology Film Archives.
