= I Call Your Name =

1964 song by the Beatles

- Picture sleeve of the 1964 German release

Song by the Beatles

from the EP Long Tall Sally
- Released: 19 June 1964
- Recorded: 1 March 1964
- Studio: EMI, London
- Genre: Rock and roll; ska
- Length: 2:09
- Label: Parlophone
- Songwriter: Lennon–McCartney
- Producer: George Martin

Long Tall Sally track listing
- 4 tracks Side one: 1. "Long Tall Sally"; 2. "I Call Your Name"; Side two: 1. "Slow Down"; 2. "Matchbox"

"I Call Your Name"

Single by Billy J. Kramer with the Dakotas
- A-side: "Bad to Me"
- Released: 26 July 1963
- Recorded: 27 June 1963
- Studio: EMI, London
- Label: Parlophone
- Songwriter: Lennon–McCartney
- Producer: George Martin

Billy J. Kramer with the Dakotas singles chronology
"Do You Want to Know a Secret" (1963)	"Bad to Me" / "I Call Your Name" (1963)	"I'll Keep You Satisfied" (1963)

"I Call Your Name" is a song recorded by the English rock band the Beatles and credited to Lennon–McCartney. It was written primarily by John Lennon, with assistance from Paul McCartney. It was released in the US on The Beatles' Second Album on 10 April 1964 and in the UK on the Long Tall Sally EP on 19 June 1964. On 7 March 1988, the song appeared on Past Masters, a compilation album that includes every song commercially released by the band that was neither included on the 12 UK studio albums nor the US Magical Mystery Tour LP, meaning that "I Call Your Name" appeared for the first time on a core catalogue album.

== Overview ==
Lennon wrote the song prior to the formation of the Beatles. In 1963, he gave it to Billy J. Kramer of The Dakotas, another Liverpool band who were signed to Parlophone by George Martin. Kramer released it as the B-side of the single "Bad to Me", another Lennon–McCartney composition.

Lennon was reportedly dissatisfied with the Dakotas' arrangement of his song as well as its position as the single's B-side, so the Beatles recorded their own version.

Since the song was being considered for inclusion in the Beatles' 1964 debut film A Hard Day's Night, a rush mono mix for United Artists was attempted on 3 March 1964, but was ultimately scrapped. The following day, a new mono mix was made for the US Capitol Records release The Beatles' Second Album, while a stereo mix, edited from two separate takes, was recorded on 10 March 1964 and was also rushed to the US for the stereo version of the album. The edit uses an alternate take of the opening guitar riff and the opening line sung by Lennon. The final UK mono mix was performed on 4 June 1964, intended for the A Hard Day's Night LP, but ultimately appearing on the EP Long Tall Sally. The final UK stereo mix, performed on 22 June 1964, three days after the release of the Long Tall Sally EP, and also intended for the upcoming stereo version of the UK album, did not appear on a British release until the 1976 Rock 'n' Roll Music compilation (along with the remaining tracks from the Long Tall Sally EP). The song was never added to the 1964 film A Hard Day's Night because director Richard Lester thought it sounded too similar to "You Can't Do That", which was recorded five days prior and featured on the non-soundtrack side of the album release.

The mono mixes feature cowbell from the start of the rhythm downbeat. The UK stereo edit has no cowbell and Lennon's vocal is single tracked until edited at the second measure of the opening verse, when the cowbell and double tracked vocal appear. The earlier US stereo mix places the edit on the word "call", and the double tracking and cowbell begin. The vocals are more prominent to the right, with the UK version being better centered, and there is a significant addition of reverb by the producers of The Beatles' Second Album.

"I Call Your Name" was re-released in stereo in 1988 on the compilation album Past Masters.

The Beatles recorded the song for the BBC radio programme Saturday Club on 31 March 1964 (transmitted 4 April 1964). However, that performance has not been commercially released.

== Personnel ==
- John Lennon – lead vocals, rhythm guitar
- Paul McCartney – bass guitar
- George Harrison – 12 string lead guitar
- Ringo Starr – drums, cowbell
- George Martin – producer
- Norman Smith – engineer

Personnel per Ian MacDonald

== Covers ==
- The Mamas & the Papas covered "I Call Your Name" in 1966 on their debut album If You Can Believe Your Eyes and Ears. Cass Elliot whispers "John... John" during the instrumental break, a nod to her crush on John Lennon. The group closes the song with, "I call your name... ye-ah!" The Beatles were well known for the phrase "Yeah, yeah, yeah" from "She Loves You".
- The Buckinghams released a version of the song in 1966.
- Tom Waits quotes two lines of the song in his 1980 ballad "Jersey Girl".
- Ringo Starr recorded a version of the song for a television special marking the 10th anniversary of Lennon's death and the 50th anniversary of his birth. The track, produced by Jeff Lynne, features a supergroup composed of Lynne, Tom Petty, Joe Walsh and Jim Keltner.
