= The Cruel Sea =

The Cruel Sea or Cruel Sea may refer to:

- The Cruel Sea (novel), 1951 novel by Nicholas Monsarrat
- The Cruel Sea (1953 film), a 1953 war film made of the above book, starring Jack Hawkins
- The Cruel Sea (1972 film), a 1972 Kuwaiti film and the first Kuwaiti film to be produced
- The Cruel Sea (band), Australian indie rock band formed in the 1980s
- "The Cruel Sea" (song), 1963 instrumental by The Dakotas; in the U.S. a.k.a. "The Cruel Surf"
- "Cruel Sea", television series episode of Walking with Dinosaurs
