= From a Window =

Single by Billy J. Kramer with The Dakotas
- B-side: "Second to None"
- Released: 17 July 1964
- Recorded: 29 May 1964; Abbey Road Studios
- Genre: Beat
- Length: 1:56
- Label: Parlophone
- Songwriter: Lennon–McCartney
- Producer: George Martin

Billy J. Kramer with The Dakotas singles chronology
""Little Children"(UK) "I'll Keep You Satisfied" (US)" (1964)	"From a Window" (1964)	"It's Gotta Last Forever" (1964)

"From a Window" is a song written by Paul McCartney, attributed to John Lennon and Paul McCartney, which was recorded by Billy J. Kramer with The Dakotas. It was the last of six Lennon–McCartney compositions recorded by Kramer.

Kramer recorded the song on 29 May 1964 at Abbey Road Studios. George Martin produced the session, which was attended by Lennon and McCartney. McCartney can be heard at the very end of the song, harmonizing on the final word. Kramer recalled the session in 2024: "One never knows who wrote what in a Lennon-McCartney song, but I think ‘From A Window’ was more Paul. If he wouldn’t have come to the session, I wouldn’t have learned the song. We learned it in the studio then and there and recorded it. It was the same with ‘Bad To Me’: John Lennon came to Abbey Road, and set up the piano.”

"From a Window" was released as a single in the UK on 17 July 1964. Its peak in August at no. 10 indicated an abrupt drop in popularity for Kramer & the Dakotas whose previous chart history comprised four Top 5 hits, two of them no. 1s. The follow-up, "It's Gotta Last Forever", fell short of the UK Top 50, and the subsequent release, "Trains and Boats and Planes", peaking at no. 12 in the summer of 1965, punctuated their two-year UK chart career.

In the US – with "I'll Be on My Way" serving as the B-side – "From a Window" reached no. 23 in October 1964. It was the band's fourth US Top 40 hit in a five-month period, and also their last. In Canada the song was No. 6 for 2 weeks on the CHUM Charts.

Chad & Jeremy recorded "From a Window" in a December 1964 New York City recording session produced by Jimmie Haskell. The track was featured on the February 1965 album release Chad & Jeremy Sing For You. World Artists Records issued the track as a single that June. By then Chad & Jeremy had other current releases on Columbia Records, but their version of "From a Window" received enough regional attention to register on the Billboard Hot 100 at no. 97. In Canada the song reached No. 38 on the CHUM Charts.

Billy J. Kramer's version of "From a Window" was included on the 1979 compilation album The Songs Lennon and McCartney Gave Away.

"From a Window" has also been recorded by Cisse (fi) (album Teen Dreams/ 1976) and by Graham Parker on his album From a Window: Lost Songs of Lennon & McCartney (2003). A cover for the Mexican market: "Desde mi ventana", was recorded by both Los Hermanos Carrión (es) and Sandro y los de Fuego.

Recordings of "From a Window" as The Beatles may have performed it are available on the 1989 album by Bas Muys entitled Secret Songs: Lennon & McCartney and on the 1998 release It's Four You by the Australian tribute band The Beatnix. It has also been covered by Seattle-based Beatles cover band Apple Jam on their album Off The Beatle Track.
