= I'll Be on My Way =

Song written by Lennon–McCartney

Single by Billy J. Kramer with the Dakotas
- A-side: "Do You Want to Know a Secret" (UK) "From a Window" (US)
- Released: 26 April 1963
- Recorded: 14, 21 March 1963
- Length: 1:40
- Label: Parlophone (UK); Imperial (US)
- Songwriter: Lennon–McCartney
- Producer: George Martin

"I'll Be on My Way"

Song by the Beatles

from the album Live at the BBC
- Released: 30 November 1994 (UK); 5 December 1994 (US)
- Recorded: 4 April 1963
- Studio: BBC Paris Theatre, London
- Genre: Pop
- Length: 1:58
- Label: Apple Records
- Songwriter: Lennon–McCartney
- Producers: Bryant Marriott, George Martin (Executive Producer)

"I'll Be on My Way" is a song written by Paul McCartney, credited to Lennon–McCartney, first released on 26 April 1963 by Billy J. Kramer with the Dakotas as the B-side of their hit debut single "Do You Want to Know a Secret", a song also written by Lennon–McCartney. The single reached number two in the UK charts while "From Me to You" by the Beatles occupied the number 1 position. The Beatles recorded a version of the song on 4 April 1963 for BBC radio, first released on the 1994 compilation album Live at the BBC.

== Composition ==
John Lennon explained "I'll Be on My Way" "was early Paul." Credited to Lennon–McCartney, Paul McCartney wrote the song in the first half of 1959. Author Todd Compton attributes it to "McCartney–Lennon." McCartney wrote the song on his first guitar, a Framus Zenith acoustic guitar. In The Beatles Anthology, McCartney recalls, "All my first songs... were written on the Zenith; songs like 'Michelle' and 'I Saw Her Standing There'. It was on this guitar that I learnt 'Twenty Flight Rock', the song that later got me into the group The Quarry Men." When first written, the song had little beyond its melody. The song was fleshed out years later after the Beatles added it to their live repertoire. (Note: Walter Everett writes the song was added to the Beatles' repertoire in "the last months of 1961", while Lewisohn writes it was not until September 1962.)

The song is heavily inspired by Buddy Holly. Musicologist and writer Ian MacDonald writes, "Played a little faster, the song reveals its debt to Buddy Holly's simple three-chords schemes. (Imagine each chorus finishing 'I'll be on my way ah-hey-hey'.)" The rising and falling chromatic line of the guitar intro comes from the Crickets' cover of "Don't Ever Change", especially the augmented E chord. After measure 11, McCartney's vocal part moves to a descant in parallel thirds above Lennon's, a technique derivative of Holly's normal double-tracked vocal patterns.

Though Lennon sang the lead vocal as a harmony duet with McCartney, he never liked the song. Beatles historian Mark Lewisohn writes that while performing it, "when they got to the line 'this way will I go'—[Lennon] pulled a crip face and hunched himself Quasimodo-like around the microphone. Paul had no choice but to ride the laughter."

== Recording ==
McCartney made a demo of the song prior to Billy J. Kramer and the Dakotas recording it. Dakotas guitarist Mike Maxfield claimed that he still owns the acetate and that all of the Beatles play on it, though this claim has never been substantiated.

The Beatles recorded the song on 4 April 1963 at the BBC Paris Theatre, London, and broadcast on the BBC radio show Side by Side on 24 June 1963. Everett writes that George Harrison's guitar solo features "the clash of bent unison double-stops", similar to those of Scotty Moore in Elvis Presley's "Just Because" and "Jailhouse Rock" and in Jerry Lee Lewis's "Livin' Lovin' Wreck".

== Release and reception ==
Everett suggests the Beatles recorded a rendition of the song only to help promote Kramer's record. The Beatles released their version on the 1994 album Live at the BBC. It is the only non-cover song on the album that was previously unreleased.

MacDonald describes the lyrics and music as "almost derisively naive". Lewisohn singles out the lyric "When the June light turns to moonlight" as the kind Lennon and McCartney "usually spurned" in others. McCartney reflected on the work in his official biography, Paul McCartney: Many Years from Now, saying "It's a little bit too June-moon for me, but these were very early songs and they worked out quite well." In 1980, John Lennon said of the song, "That's Paul, through and through. Doesn't it sound like him? Tra la la la la [laughs]. Yeah, that's Paul on the voids (joys) of driving through the country." Everett writes the "this way I will go" lyrics, "are too closely related, in an innocent way, to those of "I'll Follow the Sun." He concludes that the chord transitions are ultimately uninteresting.

== Personnel ==
According to Ian MacDonald:

- John Lennon – lead vocal, acoustic guitar
- Paul McCartney – harmony vocal, bass
- George Harrison – lead guitar
- Ringo Starr – drums

== The Billy J. Kramer version ==
Kramer and the Dakotas recorded "I'll Be On My Way" on 14 and 21 March 1963.

Billy J. Kramer and the Dakotas released their cover of the song as the B-side of their hit debut single, "Do You Want to Know a Secret" on 26 April 1963. The record held at #2 nationally in the U.K., second to the Beatles' "From Me To You". This version of the song is included on the 1979 EMI album The Songs Lennon and McCartney Gave Away.
