= Eddie Mooney =

British musician (born 1957)

- Born: 6 August 1957 (age 69); Stoke-on-Trent, England
- Genres: Rock, pop
- Occupations: Singer, bassist
- Instruments: Bass guitar, guitar
- Years active: 1974-present
- Labels: TJM Records, Castle Communications, Cherry Red Records, Sony BMG, Public Broadcasting Service, Still Unbeatable Records, Visionary Records, Maximus Records, Q Records, Stormfree Records, JKP/Warners Records
- Website: Eddie Mooney Website

Eddie Mooney (born 6 August 1957) is an English rock and pop vocalist/bassist. He is best known as a member of The Fortunes.

== Early career ==
Mooney joined his first teen pop group in Larne, Northern Ireland in 1974, called Flame, who toured with the chart acts of the time, but released no recordings. In 1975, Mooney moved to Manchester where he formed the progressive rock band Accidents with keyboardist Paul McKavanagh and drummer Alan Arenstein. Popular on the student circuit, the band survived the onset of punk, releasing their only EP "Execution" on their own Eye label. By 1978, Mooney had gone solo and, with backing group the Grave, featuring guitarist Mike Rowbottom and drummer Chris Fisher, he was signed to independent Manchester label TJM Records, which also released singles by Mick Hucknall, later of Simply Red, and Slaughter & The Dogs. In 1978, the label released the bizarre "I Bought Three Eggs" single, frequently played by BBC Radio 1 DJ John Peel. Although it did not chart, the track attained cult status being re-released on the White Dopes on Punk CD in 2005, and again on vinyl on the German Still Unbeatable label in 2009. During the 80s, Mooney was lead vocalist and bassist with Park Avenue, who toured with chart acts and released their only single "Raffy and Sean/No Control" on the independent label Q Records, which reached the lower end of the UK Top 100 in 1983. During this period Mooney recruited drummer Tony Mansfield (brother of singer Elkie Brooks), who was a former original member of the 60s hit band The Dakotas, which also backed singer Billy J. Kramer. This led to reformation of The Dakotas with original guitarist Mike Maxfield.

== The Dakotas ==
From 1989 to 2007, Mooney was a member of The Dakotas who toured the United States, Germany, Ireland and Sweden as well as the UK nostalgia and theatre circuit. The band released six albums, "The Dakotas", "The Beat Goes On", "Don't Look Back", "Everlasting", "Strong" and "Evolution" and were a regular fixture on the successful "Solid Silver 60s" tours (six to date), where they also backed acts such as Peter Noone of Herman's Hermits, Wayne Fontana, John Walker of The Walker Brothers and others. Mooney also appeared on a sporadic basis as bassist and vocalist with 70s Glam rock act The Glitter Band during this period, also recording new versions of their hits "Angel Face" and "Didn't Know I Loved You" with original member John Rossall.

== Peter Kay ==
In 2001 Mooney worked with UK comedian Peter Kay as a session singer and bassist on the successful Phoenix Nights TV series, notably singing "Don't Cry Out Loud". Mooney also sang and played on Kay's follow up series Max and Paddy's Road to Nowhere. He had a cameo role in Episode 3 performing as a musician on stage with Kay's character Max, dressed as Boy George.

== The Walker Brothers ==
As a spin-off from working with John Walker of The Walker Brothers, Mooney appeared on a US PBS television special in 2007 as a member of The Walker Brothers, where they reprised the act's UK and American hits. Their performance was subsequently released on a US-only "British Invasion" DVD.

== The Fortunes ==
In December 2007, whilst still with The Dakotas, Mooney was asked to stand in as lead vocalist and bassist with 60s and 70s British chart band The Fortunes due to the illness of original frontman Rod Allen. In early 2008 Mooney became a permanent member following the death of Allen and has been with the band ever since. Mooney played on The Fortunes albums Play On and Another Road and appeared during 2008 in Las Vegas, Netherlands and Belgium as well as the UK. The band successfully toured Canada, the Netherlands and Sweden, in addition to the UK during 2009. Since then the Fortunes continue to appear on 60s theatre package shows, as well as their own Past and Present theatre show. Mooney played on and produced the accompanying Past and Present live album. In 2016 the band appeared on the Australian "Rock the Boat" concert cruise and the band toured Australia in 2018. In 2021 the Fortunes had two hit singles on the Amazon, Spotify and iTunes download charts, "Never Too Far" (co-written by Mooney) and "One Special Moment". In 2022 and 2023 the Fortunes singles "Hello My Friend" and " One Special Moment" were hits on the UK Heritage Chart, hosted by DJ Mike Read. The Fortunes appeared on the Happy Together Tour of the USA during the summer of 2026 with US acts of the era, including the Association, the Cowsills, Ron Dante of the Archies, Jason Scheff of Chicago, Gary Puckett and the Vogues.

== Eddie Mooney and the Grave ==
After a hiatus of almost forty years, Mooney reformed the 1970s pop punk band Eddie Mooney and the Grave in 2019 with original guitarist Mike Rowbottom, Coventry drummer Rick Medlock and Munich-based guitarist and German record label owner Malte Buhr. Medlock had worked with Ben E King, Barbara Dickson, Cupid's Inspiration and ex-the Specials bassist Horace Panter. The band released a series of digital and vinyl singles, "Dennis Votes" (2019 and 2021), "Down The Drain" (2020 and 2021), "Lockdown Baby" (2020), "Telephones" (2021), "(How Does It Feel to Be) Great!!!" (2021), "Vinyl Freak" (2021) "Bone Idol" (2022), "Voodoo Chile" (2022), "Plastic Smile" (2022), "Cruella Is Here" (2023) and "No! No! No! (2024). Several of these singles charted on various digital and streaming charts.

== Die Toten Hosen ==
Mooney sang co-lead vocals with German punk metal band Die Toten Hosen on the track "Man In The Box" on their 2026 album "Trink Aus, Wir Müssen Gehen". The album topped the charts in Germany, Austria and Switzerland. The song was originally a single by Manchester punk band V2 in 1978.

== Discography ==
=== Studio albums ===
- The Dakotas by The Dakotas, Maximus Music Records, August 1991
- The Beat Goes On by The Dakotas, Maximus Music Records, September 1995
- Don't Look Back by The Dakotas, Maximus Music Records, September 2000
- Everlasting by The Dakotas, Maximus Music Records, February 2002
- Strong by The Dakotas, Maximus Music Records, February 2003
- Evolution by The Dakotas, Maximus Music Records, February 2007
- Play On by The Fortunes, Stormfree Records, 2008
- Another Road by The Fortunes, Stormfree Records, 2010
- Past And Present by The Fortunes, Stormfree Records, 2015
- The Fortunes Down Under by The Fortunes, Stormfree Records, 2018
- Special Moments by The Fortunes, Stormfree Records, 2021
- Sixty Years Live by The Fortunes, Stormfree Records, 2023

=== Compilations ===
- Identity Parade by Various Artists (Eddie Mooney & The Grave), TJM Records, December 1978
- Nights at the Oasis by Various Artists (The Dakotas), Maximus Music Records, 1991
- Holidays in the Sun by Various Artists (Eddie Mooney & V2), Visionary/Cherry Red Records, 1999
- The British Invasion Returns by Various Artists (The Dakotas), Sony BMG Records, 2000
- White Dopes on Punk by Various Artists (Eddie Mooney & The Grave), Castle Communications, 2005
- The British Beat: Best of the 60s by Various Artists (The Walker Brothers), 2007, Public Broadcasting Service
- The Accidents Collection by The Accidents, Spotify, 2015
- Keeping Control – Independent Music From Manchester 1977-1981, 3CD Box Set by Various Artists, Cherry Red Records, May 2023
- The Singles Plus by Eddie Mooney and the Grave, Still Unbeatable Records, July 2024
- The Singles 1979-2025 (vinyl album only) by Eddie Mooney and the Grave, Still Unbeatable Records, October 2025
- The Original Studio Recordings 1978 (vinyl album and CD) by The Accidents, Eye Records, November 2025
- Trink Aus, Wir Müssen Gehen (vinyl album and CD) by Die Toten Hosen, JKP/Warners Records, May 2026

=== Singles ===
- Execution EP - Execution/Stranglehold/Self-Indulgent Kid by The Accidents, Eye Records, March 1978
- I Bought Three Eggs/Zombie by Eddie Mooney & The Grave, TJM Records, December 1978
- Raffy and Sean/No Control by Parq Avenue, Q Records, March 1983
- Your Love Made a Man Out of Me by The Dakotas, Maximus Music Records, January 1996
- I Bought Three Eggs/Zombie by Eddie Mooney & The Grave, Still Unbeatable Records, April 2009
- Look on the Darkside by Eddie Mooney & The Grave, Eye Records, September 2010
- Dennis Votes/Bedtime Crime/Hard On My Brain/Soldiers by Eddie Mooney & The Grave ft Mike Rowbottom, Still Unbeatable Records, October 2019
- Down The Drain/Brainwashed/Sweaty Socks/Insects by Eddie Mooney & The Grave ft Mike Rowbottom, Still Unbeatable Records, March 2020
- Lockdown Baby/The Working Man (7" vinyl) by Eddie Mooney & The Grave ft Mike Rowbottom and Malte Buhr, Still Unbeatable Records, January 2021
- Never Too Far by The Fortunes, Stormfree Records, February 2021
- Telephones by Eddie Mooney & The Grave ft Mike Rowbottom, Malte Buhr and Rick Medlock, Snap Record/Still Unbeatable Records, July 2021
- One Special Moment by The Fortunes, Stormfree Records, May 2021
- Down The Drain (Remix) by Eddie Mooney & The Grave ft Mike Rowbottom, Malte Buhr and Rick Medlock Still Unbeatable Records, June 2021
- Telephones/Down The Drain (Remix) (7" vinyl) by Eddie Mooney & The Grave ft Mike Rowbottom, Malte Buhr and Rick Medlock, Snap Record/Still Unbeatable Records, July 2021
- Dennis Votes (Remix) by Eddie Mooney & The Grave ft Mike Rowbottom, Malte Buhr and Rick Medlock Still Unbeatable Records, July 2021
- (How Does It Feel To Be) Great!!! by Eddie Mooney & The Grave ft Mike Rowbottom, Malte Buhr and Rick Medlock Still Unbeatable Records, October 2021
- Vinyl Freak by Eddie Mooney & The Grave ft Mike Rowbottom, Malte Buhr and Rick Medlock Still Unbeatable Records, December 2021
- Your Love Made a Man Out of Me by Eddie Mooney with Toni Baker and Mike Maxfield, Stormfree Records, January 2022
- Bone Idol by Eddie Mooney & The Grave ft Mike Rowbottom, Malte Buhr and Rick Medlock, Still Unbeatable Records, March 2022
- Hello My Friend by The Fortunes, Creative & Dreams Records, April 2022
- Voodoo Chile by Eddie Mooney & The Grave ft Richard Benson, Eye Records, June 2022
- Plastic Smile(Single Edit) by Eddie Mooney & The Grave, Eye Records, September 2022
- One Special Moment (US Remix) by The Fortunes, Creative & Dreams Records, March 2023
- I Bought Three Eggs (Remix) by Eddie Mooney & The Grave, Still Unbeatable Records - Cherry Red Records, May 2023
- I Just Don't Know What To Do With Myself by The Fortunes, Creative & Dreams Records, July 2023
- Never Too Far (Remix) by The Fortunes, Creative & Dreams Records, October 2023
- Cruella Is Here by Eddie Mooney & The Grave ft Mike Rowbottom, Malte Buhr and Rick Medlock, Still Unbeatable Records, November 2023
- The Crying Game by Eddie Mooney with Mike Maxfield, Eye Records, December 2023
- No! No! No! by Eddie Mooney & The Grave ft Mike Rowbottom, Malte Buhr and Rick Medlock, Still Unbeatable Records, March 2024
- The Dark Side by Eddie Mooney & The Grave ft Mike Rowbottom, Malte Buhr and Rick Medlock, Still Unbeatable Records, November 2024
- The Wind Walker by Eddie Mooney & The Grave ft Mike Rowbottom and Mark Standley, Still Unbeatable Records, March 2025
- How Does It Feel To Be Great!!! (2025 Remix) by Eddie Mooney & The Grave ft Mike Rowbottom, Malte Buhr and Rick Medlock Still Unbeatable Records, May 2025
- Little Peter Street by Eddie Mooney & The Grave ft Mike Rowbottom and V2 Still Unbeatable-Detour Records, September 2026
