= Theme One =

1967 instrumental piece by George Martin

Song by George Martin and his Orchestra

from the album Produced by George Martin
- Released: 29 September 1967 (45 rpm single), CD album release 17 July 2001
- Genre: Classical, orchestral
- Length: 2:30
- Label: United Artists Records
- Composer: George Martin
- Producer: George Martin

Theme One is a 1967 instrumental piece by George Martin, used from 1967 until the mid-1970s as the opening and closing theme tune for BBC Radio 1 and BBC Radio 2. Theme One was first played on Radio 2, immediately before Radio 1 began broadcasting independently, on the launch day of both stations, 30 September 1967 (The Move's "Flowers in the Rain" was the first record played in full on Radio 1).

== Composition ==
George Martin recalled in his autobiography All You Need is Ears that Robin Scott, the BBC controller planning the new Radio 1 and Radio 2, approached Northern Songs publisher Dick James to ask if Paul McCartney was interested in composing a theme for the new station. McCartney turned the commission down, but James suggested George Martin, who had produced the Beatles' studio recordings at Abbey Road Studios. The classically trained Martin had been responsible for the majority of the orchestrations and unusual instrumentation on the Beatles' albums, including the double string quartet on "Eleanor Rigby" and the piccolo trumpet solo on "Penny Lane", which led him to be considered a candidate as "the Fifth Beatle".

Robin Scott's specification requested an opening theme that was "very English, very contemporary, with classical overtones, and strikingly unusual." The finished recording is a crossover which blends a classical orchestra (including a Baroque-style trumpet fanfare) with contemporary rock instruments - electric guitar and bass, drum kit and featuring heavy electronic phasing. The work opens with a pipe organ solo, played by Martin himself at Central Hall, Westminster and cut into the studio recording.

On hearing the work, Anna Instone, the head of the BBC Record Library, is reputed to have said "Good God, it sounds like William Walton gone mad!" Martin recalled that Robin Scott was very satisfied with the piece and it was the first piece of music heard at the launch of BBC Radios 1 and 2 on 30 September 1967. Scott introduced the work simultaneously on BBC Radios 1 and 2 and played the work in full to listeners on launch day:

Like a new pair of shoes, we shall be breaking the networks in until they fit properly and we must crave your indulgence if the shoes squeak a bit, though we hope they won't. Very far from a squeak is the exciting sound of George Martin's "Theme One" for Radio 1, part of which will herald the start of Radio 1's and Radio 2's day from now on and close the combined networks at 2 o'clock in the evening.

== Recordings ==
The original recording was released as a 45-rpm single the day before the Radio 1 launch, 29 September 1967, with the B-side another instrumental by Martin called "Elephants and Castles". It was also released as a 12 inch "Special Collectors Single" with the flip side "Over The Top" It was track six of side one on the LP album British Maid (UK release title) and London by George (U.S. title) in 1968. It was reissued on CD in the retrospective album Produced by George Martin released in 2001. Martin also re-recorded the work in 1974 for his orchestral album Beatles to Bond and Bach.

"Theme One"
- UK single gatefold

Single by Van der Graaf Generator

from the album Pawn Hearts
- B-side: "W"
- Released: February 1972
- Recorded: July 1971
- Studio: Trident
- Genre: Progressive rock, jazz-rock
- Length: 2:53
- Label: Charisma (UK), Philips (EU/AUS)
- Composer: George Martin
- Producer: John Anthony

Theme One was covered by the British progressive rock group Van der Graaf Generator. Originally played on stage at the band's concerts, it was later recorded and released as a single (which achieved Number One in Italy) and appeared on US pressings of the album Pawn Hearts. The rock drummer Cozy Powell released a version on his album Over the Top in 1979. The Collapso, from National Health's second album Of Queues and Cures (1978) impromptu with the main theme melody.
