= Mike Maxfield =

English songwriter and lead guitarist (1944–2023)

- Born: Michael William Maxfield; 23 February 1944; Manchester, England, UK
- Died: 2 December 2023 (aged 79)
- Genres: pop
- Instruments: Guitar, vocals
- Years active: 1960–2005
- Formerly of: The Dakotas

Michael William Maxfield (23 February 1944 – 2 December 2023) was an English composer, songwriter and guitarist, who came to fame as a member of The Dakotas.

== Career ==
Maxfield joined The Dakotas in February 1962 and backed Billy J. Kramer throughout the early 1960s. He composed their song "The Cruel Sea", which was also recorded by The Ventures. Maxfield left in 1965 to focus on songwriting, and was the band was reduced to a trio. Maxfield was sponsored by the Guild Guitar Company and was given their guitars for no charge.

In 1989, Maxfield, with new members including Toni Baker and Eddie Mooney, reformed the Dakotas. In 2005, Maxfield suffered a serious stroke leaving him unable to walk and ending his career as a musician; he allowed the band to carry on, while stilling with them behind the scenes. Other acts with which Maxfield has collaborated include George Martin, Coffin Daggers, Les Champions, and The Challengers.

== Personal life ==
Whilst residing in Heaton Moor, Stockport, Maxfield's nine year old daughter, Lucy, was tragically struck by a car and killed in 1997. After donating her organs, Lucy's life went on to save several others. In 2000, Maxfield appeared on an episode of Panorama, to advocate for a change in speed limits.

After developing complications from dementia Maxfield died in December 2023, at the age of 79. He leaves behind his wife Merle Maxfield.

== Notes ==
- https://news.bbc.co.uk/2/hi/uk_news/642626.stm
