= Little Children (album) =

Studio album by Billy J. Kramer & The Dakotas
- Released: 1964
- Recorded: 1963–1964, EMI Studios, London
- Genre: Rock, rock and roll
- Length: 32:45
- Label: Imperial
- Producer: George Martin

Billy J. Kramer & The Dakotas chronology
Listen (1963)	Little Children (1964)	From a Window (EP) (1964)

Little Children is the second album by the English rock band Billy J. Kramer & The Dakotas. It was released by Imperial Records in the United States in 1964. There never was a British version.

== Track listing ==
Side 1

1. Little Children (J. Leslie McFarland/Mort Shuman) 2:46
2. Da Doo Ron Ron (Phil Spector/Jeff Barry/Ellie Greenwich) 1:52
3. Dance With Me (Glick/Lobish/Naham/Treadwell) 2:14
4. Pride (Madera/White) 2:20
5. I Know (George Martin/Bob Wooler) 2:05
6. They Remind Me Of You (Maxfield/McDonald) 2:19

Side 2

1. Do You Want to Know a Secret? (McCartney/Lennon) 2:01
2. Bad To Me (John Lennon/Paul McCartney) 2:18
3. I'll Keep You Satisfied (John Lennon/Paul McCartney) 2:04
4. Great Balls Of Fire (Otis Blackwell, Jack Hammer) 1:44
5. It's Up to You (Fuller) 2:47
6. Tell Me Girl (Smith) 2:47
