= The Cruel Sea (song) =

Single by The Dakotas
- B-side: "The Millionaire"
- Released: 5 July 1963
- Recorded: 29 May 1963
- Studio: Abbey Road Studios
- Genre: Instrumental rock
- Label: Parlophone
- Songwriter: Mike Maxfield
- Producer: George Martin

The Cruel Sea is a 1963 song by The Dakotas. It made #18 on the UK singles chart. The song was written by Mike Maxfield, the Dakotas' lead guitarist. In the U.S. the track was initially released as "The Cruel Surf" (Liberty 55618).

== Cover versions ==
- The Ventures covered it on their album The Fabulous Ventures and as the B-side to "Walk, Don't Run '64".
- The Challengers on their 1965 album Go Sidewalk Surfing!.
- California Guitar Trio on their 2008 album Echoes.

== Documentary ==
In 2001, the track was featured in the documentary Produced by George Martin.
