= The Good German (soundtrack) =

Film score by Thomas Newman
- Released: January 9, 2007
- Length: 44:26
- Label: Varèse Sarabande

Thomas Newman chronology
Little Children (2006)	The Good German (2007)	WALL-E (2008)

Professional ratings
Review scores
Source	Rating
SoundtrackNet	5/5 stars

The Good German (Original Motion Picture Soundtrack) is the soundtrack of the 2006 film The Good German. The original score was composed by Thomas Newman, and released by Varèse Sarabande on January 9, 2007. The soundtrack was nominated for an Academy Award for Best Original Score.

== Track listing ==
Below is a list of tracks:

1. "Unrecht Oder Recht (Main Title)" – 2:25
2. "River Havel" – 1:07
3. "Countless Roundheels" – 1:22
4. "Such a Boy"" – 1:36
5. "Kraut Brain Trust" – 1:05
6. "The Russian Deals" – 1:12
7. "A Good Dose" – 1:11
8. "Muller's Billet" – 0:48
9. "Wittenbergplatz" – 0:46
10. "Trip Ticket" – 1:41
11. "Safe House" – 0:57
12. "A Nazi and a Jew" – 1:51
13. "Dora" – 2:49
14. "Kurfürstendamm" – 0:44
15. "The Big Three" – 1:25
16. "A Persilschein" – 1:36
17. "Stickball" – 0:27
18. "Golem" – 1:10
19. "The Atom Bomb" – 1:31
20. "The Good German" – 2:10
21. "Hannelore" – 1:01
22. "Occupation Marks" – 1:19
23. "U-Bahn" – 1:37
24. "The Brandenburg Gate" – 1:26
25. "Skinny Lena" – 1:44
26. "Rockets for Our Side" – 1:50
27. "Always Something Worse" – 2:05
28. "Godless People (End Title)" – 2:43
29. "Jedem Das Seine" – 2:48
