= Little Children (soundtrack) =

Little Children (Original Motion Picture Score)

Film score by Thomas Newman
- Released: December 11, 2006
- Genre: Film score
- Length: 37:32
- Label: New Line Records
- Producer: Thomas Newman; Bill Bernstein

Thomas Newman chronology
Jarhead (2005)	Little Children (Original Motion Picture Score) (2006)	The Good German (2006)

Little Children (Original Motion Picture Score) is the film score of the 2006 film Little Children, composed by Thomas Newman. The album was released by New Line Records on December 11, 2006.

== Track listing ==
Little Children (Original Motion Picture Score)
No.	Title	Length
1.	"Snack Time"	1:11
2.	"Tissue"	0:52
3.	"2 Hillcrest"	0:47
4.	"Late Hit"	1:12
5.	"Bandshell"	2:05
6.	"Red Bathing Suit"	2:03
7.	"Lucy"	1:46
8.	"It's Wrong and It's Weird"	2:33
9.	"Pool Days"	1:49
10.	"Weekends Were Difficult"	1:47
11.	"What's the Hurry?"	3:31
12.	"Fly Me to the Moon (In Other Words)" (arranged by Sammy Nestico)	2:35
13.	"Mae"	1:08
14.	"A Sniff or Two"	1:42
15.	"Torso"	1:10
16.	"Be a Good Boy"	1:41
17.	"Slutty Kay"	0:42
18.	"Little Children"	1:10
19.	"End Title"	7:40
Total length:		37:32
