= Do You Want to Know a Secret =

Beatles single from 1963

- US picture sleeve

Single by the Beatles

from the album Introducing... The Beatles
- B-side: "Thank You Girl"
- Released: 22 March 1963 (UK Please Please Me album); 23 March 1964 (US single)
- Recorded: 11 February 1963
- Studio: EMI, London
- Genre: Merseybeat; pop; doo-wop
- Length: 1:56
- Label: Parlophone (UK); Vee-Jay (US)
- Songwriter: Lennon–McCartney
- Producer: George Martin

The Beatles US singles chronology
"Can't Buy Me Love" (1964)	"Do You Want to Know a Secret" (1964)	"Love Me Do" (1964)

Music video
- "Do You Want to Know a Secret" on YouTube

Audio sample
- file; help

"Do You Want to Know a Secret" is a song by English rock band the Beatles from their 1963 album Please Please Me, sung by George Harrison. In the United States, it was the first top ten song to feature Harrison as a lead singer, reaching No. 2 on the Billboard chart in 1964 as a single released by Vee-Jay, VJ 587. In the UK, Billy J. Kramer released a cover of the song as his debut single on 26 April 1963, reaching No. 1 on the NME singles chart and No. 2 on the Record Retailer chart.

== Composition ==
"Do You Want to Know a Secret", written in autumn 1962, was primarily composed by John Lennon but credited to McCartney–Lennon. The song was inspired by "I'm Wishing", a tune from Walt Disney's 1937 animated film Snow White and the Seven Dwarfs which Lennon's mother, Julia, would sing to him as a child. The first two lines of the song in Disney's movie ("Want to know a secret? Promise not to tell?") come right after the opening lyrics ("You'll never know how much I really love you... You'll never know how much I really care..."). McCartney has said it was a "50–50 collaboration written to order", i.e., for Harrison to sing. Lennon, who always claimed the song as his own, explained in a 1980 interview that he had realized as soon as he had finished writing the song that it best suited Harrison.

== Recording ==
In 1980, Lennon said that he gave "Do You Want to Know a Secret" to Harrison to sing because "it only had three notes and he wasn't the best singer in the world", but added "he has improved a lot since then." The song was recorded as part of their marathon ten-hour recording session on 11 February 1963 along with nine other songs for Please Please Me. Harrison sang two songs on Please Please Me—this song by Lennon–McCartney and "Chains" by Goffin/King. "Don't Bother Me" would be Harrison's debut composition and appeared on the Beatles' next UK album With the Beatles.

Harrison and Lennon both played acoustic guitars on the recording in different channels: on the stereo mix, Harrison's guitar was panned to the right channel while Lennon's was panned to the left.

== Single release ==
"Do You Want to Know a Secret" was released a year later as a single by Vee-Jay in the United States on 23 March 1964, reaching the number two spot behind "Hello, Dolly!" by Louis Armstrong in Billboard, reaching number three on the Cash Box chart, but reaching number one for two weeks in the chart published by the Teletheatre Research Institute. In the U.S., it was the most successful Beatles song on which Harrison sang lead vocal until "Something" peaked at No. 1 as part of a double-sided number one hit with "Come Together" in 1969.

== Personnel ==
- George Harrison – lead vocals, acoustic guitar (right channel)
- John Lennon – acoustic guitar (left channel), backing vocals
- Paul McCartney – bass guitar, backing vocals
- Ringo Starr – drums, tapped drumsticks

Engineered by Norman Smith

Personnel per Walter Everett and John Winn

== Charts and certifications ==
=== Charts ===
Chart (1964)	Peak position
German Media Control Singles Chart	34
New Zealand (Lever Hit Parade)	2
US Billboard Hot 100	2
US Cash Box Top 100	3

=== Certifications ===
Region	Certification	Certified units/sales
United States (RIAA)	Gold	500,000^{‡}
^{‡} Sales+streaming figures based on certification alone.

== Billy J. Kramer version ==
"Do You Want to Know a Secret?"

Single by Billy J. Kramer with the Dakotas

from the album Little Children
- B-side: "I'll Be on My Way"
- Released: 26 April 1963
- Recorded: 1963
- Genre: Pop; beat
- Length: 2:01
- Label: Parlophone (UK); Imperial (US)
- Songwriter: Lennon–McCartney
- Producer: George Martin

Billy J. Kramer with the Dakotas singles chronology
"Do You Want to Know a Secret?" (1963)	"Bad to Me" (1963)

The Beatles' version was never released as a single in the UK, where a cover version by Billy J. Kramer with the Dakotas (released b/w "I'll Be on My Way", Parlophone R5023, 26 April 1963) reached number two in the Record Retailer chart, and hit number one in the NME chart (used by Radio Luxembourg) and the BBC's Pick of the Pops chart, which were more widely recognised at the time. It appeared on his album, Little Children. It reached number eight in the Irish Singles Chart.

=== Chart performance ===
Chart (1963)	Peak position
United Kingdom (Record Retailer)	2
United Kingdom (NME)	1

== Other cover versions ==
Santo and Johnny, Count Basie and His Orchestra, Mary Wells, Keely Smith, Sonny Curtis, Bobby Vee, The Johnny Mann Singers, The Ray Charles Singers, Sharon Clark, Fairground Attraction, and The Hollyridge Strings also recorded the song.

Swedish actress and recording artist Anita Lindblom recorded a Swedish-language version titled "Lyssna (vill du veta vad jag tänker?)" for her 1968 album Sån't är livet.

The song reached the No. 1 position on Billboard in 1981 and No. 2 in the United Kingdom as part of the cover-medley "Stars on 45".
