= I'll Keep You Satisfied =

Single by Billy J. Kramer with The Dakotas

from the album Little Children (album)
- B-side: "I Know"
- Released: 1 November 1963
- Recorded: 14 October 1963; Abbey Road Studios
- Length: 2:06
- Label: Parlophone (UK); Imperial (US)
- Songwriter: Lennon–McCartney
- Producer: George Martin

Billy J. Kramer with The Dakotas singles chronology
"Bad to Me" (1963)	"I'll Keep You Satisfied" (1963)	"Little Children" (1964)

"I'll Keep You Satisfied" is a song written primarily by Paul McCartney and credited to the Lennon-McCartney partnership. It was released as a single by Billy J. Kramer with the Dakotas on 1 November 1963, and released on Kramer's album Little Children. It reached number 4 and spent 13 weeks in the UK charts, kept off the top spot by the Beatles' "She Loves You" (another Lennon–McCartney composition) and the Gerry & the Pacemakers version of the 1945 song "You'll Never Walk Alone". The song hit #30 in the US charts in 1964.

== Recording ==
The song was recorded on 14 October 1963 at Abbey Road Studios. Lennon was present at the recording.
