= Bad to Me =

1963 single by Billy J. Kramer with the Dakotas

Single by Billy J. Kramer with the Dakotas

from the album Little Children
- B-side: "I Call Your Name"
- Released: 26 July 1963
- Recorded: 27 June 1963 (Note: In Richie Unterberger's 2006 book The Unreleased Beatles, he dates Kramer's recording to 26 June 1963 on one page, but later writes it was 27 June. In The Beatles Diary, Barry Miles dates the recording to 27 June, adding that Paul McCartney attended the recording session at EMI Studios.)
- Studio: EMI, London
- Length: 2:22
- Label: Parlophone
- Songwriter: Lennon–McCartney
- Producer: George Martin

Billy J. Kramer with the Dakotas singles chronology
"Do You Want to Know a Secret" (1963)	"Bad to Me" (1963)	"I'll Keep You Satisfied" (1963)

"Bad to Me"

Song by the Beatles

from the album The Beatles Bootleg Recordings 1963
- Released: 17 December 2013
- Recorded: 1963
- Genre: Merseybeat
- Length: 1:29
- Label: Apple, Universal Music Group
- Songwriter: Lennon–McCartney

"Bad to Me" is a song credited to Lennon–McCartney. In late interviews, John Lennon said that he wrote it for Billy J. Kramer with the Dakotas while on holiday in Spain. However, in a 1964 interview he said that he and Paul McCartney wrote it in the back of a van, declaring McCartney a contributor. Lennon's original demo of the song was released on iTunes in December 2013 on the album The Beatles Bootleg Recordings 1963. It became one of the first occasions a Lennon–McCartney composition made the US Top 40 recorded by an artist other than the Beatles (the first being "A World Without Love" by Peter & Gordon).

== Chart performance ==
Billy J. Kramer with the Dakotas released their recording of the song in 1963 and it became their first number 1 in the UK Singles Chart. Paul McCartney was present during the recording session at EMI Studios in London. The single was released in the US the following year, and was a top-ten hit there, reaching number 9. In Canada "Bad To Me' reached number 12 on both the CHUM and RPM charts.

== Cover versions ==
- Terry Black released a version of the song on his 1965 debut album, Only 16.
- Graham Parker recorded a version of the song for the 2003 album Lost Songs of Lennon & McCartney, new versions of 17 Lennon–McCartney songs that were originally released by other artists. Leif Garrett also recorded a version of the song for his self-titled debut album. Finnish rock band Hurriganes covered this song in their third album, Crazy Days.
- Recordings of "Bad to Me" as the Beatles may have performed it are available on the 1989 album by Bas Muys entitled Secret Songs: Lennon & McCartney and on the 1998 release It's Four You by the Australian tribute band The Beatnix.
- Die Toten Hosen, published a cover of bad for me on the album Learning English Lesson 3: Mersey Beat! The Sound of Liverpool.

== Sources ==
- Miles, Barry (2001). The Beatles Diary Volume 1: The Beatles Years. London: Omnibus Press. ISBN 978-0-7119-8308-3 – via Google Books.
- Unterberger, Richie (2006). The Unreleased Beatles: Music & Film. San Francisco: Backbeat Books. ISBN 978-0-87930-892-6 – via Google Books.
