= Little Children (song) =

Single by Billy J. Kramer with the Dakotas

from the album Little Children
- B-side: "They Remind Me Of You"; (Maxfield/McDonald) (UK); "Bad to Me"; (Lennon/McCartney) (US)
- Released: 1964, October 1987 (reissue)
- Genre: Pop; beat
- Length: 2:45
- Label: Parlophone R5105
- Songwriter(s): J. Leslie McFarland, Mort Shuman
- Producer(s): George Martin

Billy J. Kramer with the Dakotas singles chronology
"Bad to Me (US release)" (1964)	"Little Children" (1964)	"Bad to Me (US re-release)" (1964)

"Little Children" is a song written by J. Leslie McFarland and Mort Shuman, and was recorded by Billy J. Kramer & the Dakotas.

== Background ==
The lyric concerns a man's entreaties to his girlfriend's young siblings not to reveal his courtship of their elder sister and to leave them alone. At some points he even bribes them with such things as sweets, money and entertainment on the condition that they "keep a secret". As such, it was a departure from the traditional love songs previously recorded by Kramer (sometimes supplied by Lennon & McCartney). When offered another Lennon and McCartney song, "One and One Is Two", for his next single by the manager of both groups, Brian Epstein, Kramer turned it down and chose "Little Children" instead, after a search for suitable material from music publishers.

== Chart performance ==
"Little Children" reached No.1 in the UK Singles Chart in March 1964, and No. 7 in the US Hot 100 singles chart later the same year. The B-side of "Little Children" in the U.S., "Bad to Me" (which had previously been an A-side in the UK and which made No. 1 there in August 1963) peaked at No. 9 on the US charts simultaneously to the success of "Little Children". In Canada "Little Children" reached No. 12 on the CHUM Charts, while "Bad To Me' reached No. 12 on both the CHUM and RPM charts.
