= Billy J. Kramer =

English pop singer (born 1943)

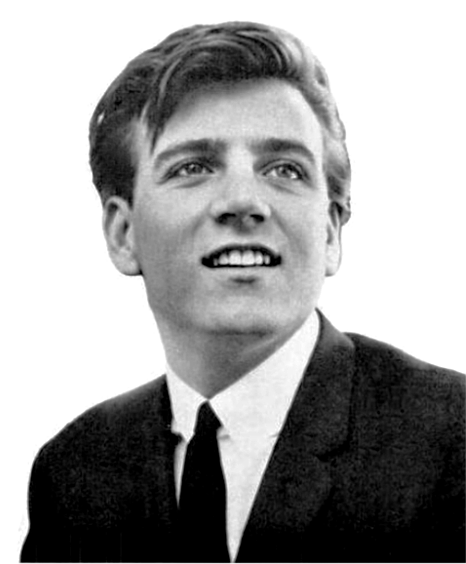
- Kramer, 1965

Background information
- Born: William Howard Ashton; 19 August 1943 (age 83); Bootle, Lancashire, England
- Origin: Liverpool, Lancashire, England
- Genres: Pop; Merseybeat; British rock and roll
- Occupation: Singer
- Instrument: Vocals
- Years active: 1963–present
- Labels: Parlophone; Imperial
- Website: billyjkramermusic.com

William Howard Ashton (born 19 August 1943), known professionally as Billy J. Kramer, is an English pop singer. With the Dakotas, Kramer was managed by Brian Epstein during the 1960s and scored hits with several Lennon–McCartney compositions never recorded by the Beatles, among them the UK number one "Bad to Me" (1963). Kramer and the Dakotas had a further UK chart-topper in 1964 with "Little Children" and achieved U.S. success as part of the British Invasion. Since the end of the beat boom, Kramer has continued to record and perform. His autobiography, Do You Want to Know a Secret, was published in 2016.

== Early life and career ==
Kramer grew up as the youngest of seven siblings and attended the St George of England Secondary School, Bootle. He then took up an engineering apprenticeship with British Railways and in his spare time played rhythm guitar in a group he had formed himself, before switching to become a vocalist. The performing name Kramer was chosen at random from a telephone directory. John Lennon suggested that the "J" be added to the name further to distinguish him by adding a "tougher edge". Kramer soon came to the attention of Brian Epstein, ever on the look-out for new talent to add to his expanding roster of local artists. Kramer turned professional but his then backing group, the Coasters, were less keen, so Epstein sought out the services of a Manchester-based group, the Dakotas, a combo then backing Pete MacLaine.

Even then, the Dakotas would not join Kramer without a recording contract of their own. Once in place, the deal was set and both acts signed to Parlophone under George Martin. Collectively, they were named Billy J. Kramer with the Dakotas to keep their own identities within the act. Once the Beatles broke through, the way was paved for a tide of Merseybeat and Kramer was offered the chance to cover "Do You Want to Know a Secret?" first released by the Beatles on their own debut album, Please Please Me. The track had been turned down by Shane Fenton (later known as Alvin Stardust) who was looking for a career-reviving hit.

=== Success ===
With record producer George Martin, the song "Do You Want to Know a Secret?" was a number two UK Singles Chart hit in 1963, (but number one in some charts) and was backed by another tune otherwise unreleased by the Beatles, "I'll Be on My Way". After this impressive breakthrough another Lennon/McCartney pairing, "Bad to Me" c/w "I Call Your Name", reached number one. It sold over a million copies and was awarded a gold disc. "I'll Keep You Satisfied" ended the year with a respectable number four placing.

Kramer was given a series of songs specially written for him by Lennon and McCartney which launched him into stardom. "I'll Keep You Satisfied", "From a Window", "I Call Your Name" (recorded by The Beatles themselves) and "Bad to Me" earned him appearances on the television programmes, Shindig!, Hullabaloo (hosted by Beatles manager Epstein) and The Ed Sullivan Show. (Kramer had also been offered Lennon/McCartney's "I'm in Love" and recorded a version in October 1963. In the end, it was shelved and the song was instead given to the Fourmost. In the 1990s, a Kramer compilation album included his version, as well as some recording studio banter on which Lennon's voice could be heard).

The Dakotas enjoyed Top 20 success in 1963 on their own with the Mike Maxfield composition "The Cruel Sea", an instrumental retitled "The Cruel Surf" in the US, which was subsequently covered by The Ventures as The Cruel Sea. This was followed by a George Martin creation, "Magic Carpet", in which an echo-laden piano played the melody alongside Maxfield's guitar. But it missed out altogether and it was a year before their next release. All four tracks appeared on an EP later that year.

The three hits penned by Lennon and McCartney suggested that Kramer would always remain in the Beatles' shadow, unless he tried something different. Despite being advised against it, he turned down the offer of another Lennon/McCartney song, "One and One Is Two", and insisted on recording the Stateside chart hit "Little Children". It became his second chart topper and biggest hit. In the United States, "Little Children" was backed with "Bad to Me". This was the only debut single of an act on the Hot 100, each of whose sides separately reached that chart's The Top 10 (No. 7 and No. 9, respectively). "From a Window", a Lennon/McCartney composition, was his second and final UK single of 1964 and became a Top Ten hit.

=== After the peak ===
The 1965 Kramer single "It's Gotta Last Forever" signified a shift to a ballad approach. It failed to chart, though Kramer's cover version of Bacharach and David's "Trains and Boats and Planes" eclipsed Anita Harris' version in the UK, reaching number 12. All subsequent releases failed to chart.

The Dakotas' ranks were then strengthened by the inclusion of Mick Green, formerly a guitarist with the London band the Pirates who backed Johnny Kidd. This line-up cut a few tracks which were at odds with the balladeer's usual fare. These included a take on "When You Walk in the Room" and "Sneakin' Around". The Dakotas' final outing whilst with Kramer was the blues-driven "Oyeh!", but this also flopped.

== Later career ==
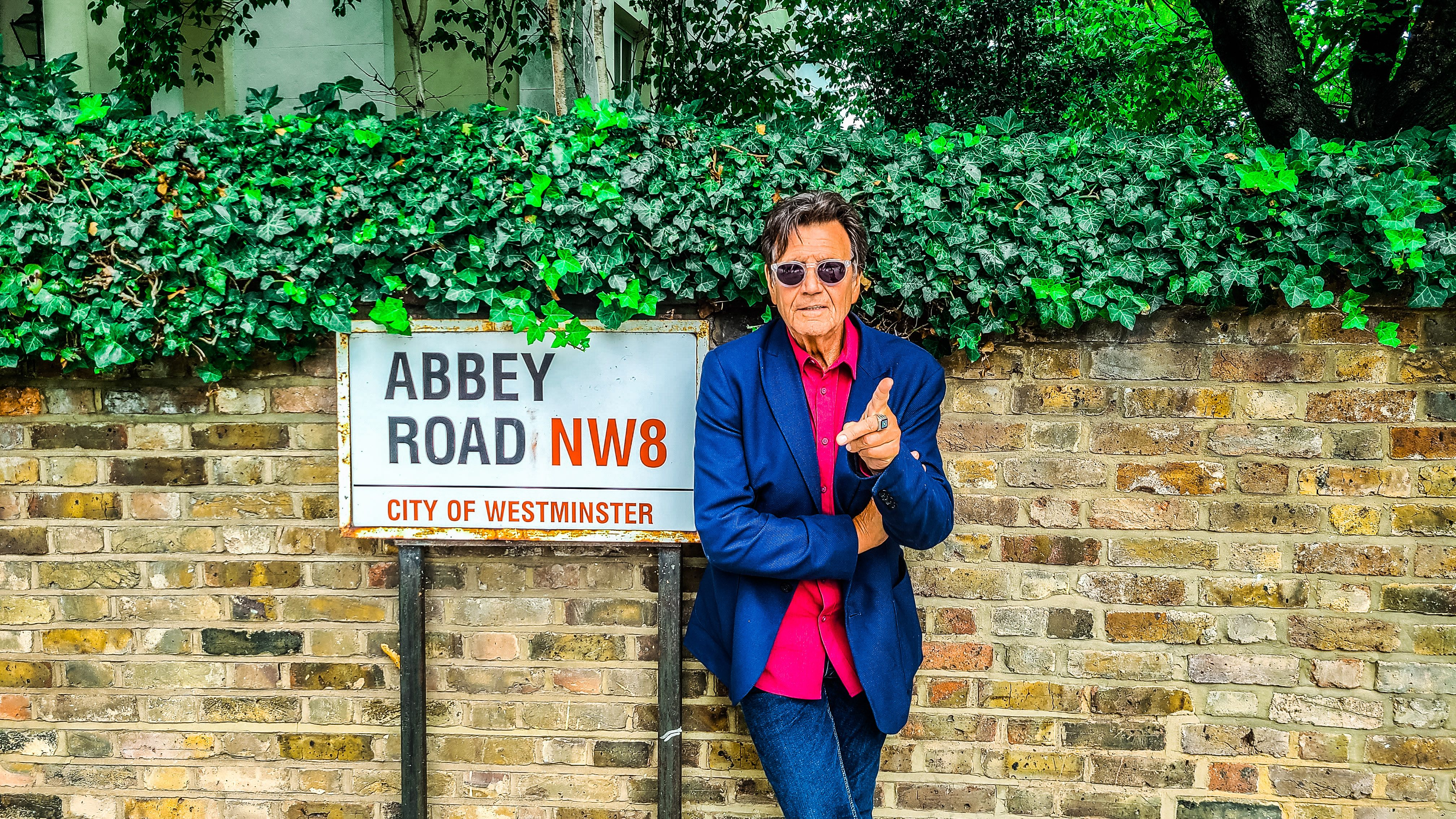
Kramer in 2023, recording at Abbey Road Studios

After releasing "We're Doing Fine", which also missed the charts, the singer and group parted company. Kramer, then lived in Rugby, Warwickshire, after marrying a local woman Ann Ginn there in 1968. He had a solo career over the next ten to fifteen years or so, working in cabaret and television with his new band, again from the Manchester area, consisting of Pete Heaton (bass), John Miller (drums) and Tim Randles (guitar); this later saw changes with Bob Price now on bass and Roger Bell on guitar.

In the late 1970s, Kramer teamed up with Bedford musicians Mike Austin (bass), Max Milligan (guitar) and John Dillon (percussion), the one constant member throughout the changes in musicians at this time was his sound engineer Stewart Oakes, performing cabaret in the UK and Europe, whilst also recording "San Diego" and "Ships that Pass in the Night" – after which Kramer eventually went to live in the United States.

The Dakotas re-formed in the late 1980s and recruited vocalist Eddie Mooney and session musician Toni Baker. They still tour and record. Other latter-day members are drummer Pete Hilton and guitarist Alan Clare.

In 1983, Kramer released a solo single on the RAK label, "You Can't Live on Memories" / "Stood Up", which failed to chart. The following year, 1984, he released "Shootin' the Breeze" / "Doris Day Movie" on 'Mean Records'. Again, this failed to chart.

In 2005, Kramer recorded the song "Cow Planet" for Dog Train, the children's album by Sandra Boynton. A long-term fan of Kramer, Boynton had sought him out for her project: in 1964, at the age of 11, Little Children became the first album she ever bought.

In late 2012, Kramer went back into the studio for the first time in years to record a new CD, I Won the Fight, which was released in 2013. The CD features some new songs written by Kramer, as well as some covers.

In 2013, Kramer provided the introduction to the graphic novel The Fifth Beatle by Vivek Tiwary. The book was released in November and spent several weeks on the New York Times best-seller list, reaching No. 1 in its third week of release. He also released a new album, entitled I Won the Fight.

In 2015, Kramer was part of the British Invasion 50th Anniversary tour, performing in the US and the UK. The following year saw the publication of his autobiography Do You Want to Know A Secret, co-written with Alyn Shipton. In February 2024, Kramer released a single "Are You With Me" which charted on The Heritage Chart. His latest release, November 2025, is the single "Go On Girl".
