= The Dakotas (band) =

English backing band for Billy J. Kramer

- Origin: Manchester, England
- Genres: Pop; rock
- Years active: 1962–1968; 1989–2021; 2025–2026
- Labels: Parlophone; Imperial
- Past members: Robin McDonald; Tony Mansfield; Bryn Jones; Ian Fraser; Alexander Byers (Drummer); Ray Jones; Mike Maxfield; Mick Green; Frank Farley; Toni Baker; Eddie Mooney; Richard Benson; Pete Hilton; Alan Clare; Paul Rafferty; Marius Jones; Ronnie Ravey; Robin Hill
- Website: Link

The Dakotas was a group of British musicians, which initially convened as a backing band in Manchester, England. They originally backed club singer Pete Maclaine, but after signing to Brian Epstein, he had Maclaine replaced with the singer Billy J. Kramer, a Liverpudlian who the band backed during the 1960s, performing on two UK number ones sung by Kramer. The band also recorded singles by themselves, usually instrumental. In North America, they are regarded as part of the British Invasion.

The lineup that recorded on Kramer's hit records was guitar players Mike Maxfield and Robin McDonald, bassist Ray Jones, and drummer Tony Mansfield. Kramer stopped working with the Dakotas in 1967 and by the time they disbanded in 1968, the band was a trio of McDonald on bass, guitarist Mick Green and drummer Frank Farley. The Dakotas reformed in 1989, and in 2004, performed the music for the comedy show Max and Paddy's Road to Nowhere. By the time the Dakotas disbanded again 2021, the band had no original members, as Maxfield suffered a stroke and retired from performing in 2004.

== History ==
=== Origins: 1962—1963 ===
The group's name arose from an engagement at the Plaza Ballroom in Oxford Street, Manchester. Their manager asked the group to return the next week dressed as Indians and called the Dakotas, founded in September 1960 by rhythm guitarist Robin MacDonald (born 18 July 1943, Nairn, Scotland, died 9 September 2015), with Bryn Jones on lead guitar; Tony Mansfield (born Anthony Bookbinder, 28 May 1943, Salford, Lancashire / Elkie Brooks older brother) on drums, and Ian Fraser on bass. Ray Jones (born Raymond Jones, 22 October 1939, Oldham, Lancashire – died 20 January 2000) joined the band as bassist replacing Ian Fraser, and Mike Maxfield joined the band in February 1962 as lead guitarist replacing Bryn Jones after being with a Manchester band called the Coasters.

=== Backing Billy J. Kramer: 1963—1967 ===
The group first backed Pete MacLaine (born 1942) between February 1962 and January 1963. However, Brian Epstein, who was managing Billy J. Kramer, made the Dakotas an offer to become Kramer's backing band, which they accepted. Epstein insisted the name was "Billy J Kramer with the Dakotas", not "...and...". The group and Billy J Kramer then went to Hamburg to perfect their act.

In addition to backing Kramer on his hits, the group itself is perhaps best known for their instrumental single called "The Cruel Sea", a composition of Maxfield that reached No.18 in the UK singles chart in July 1963. The track was re-titled "The Cruel Surf" in the U.S., and was subsequently covered by the Ventures.

The band released "Magic Carpet" by George Martin in September 1963. It was not a hit. Their next single, "Oyeh" (November 1964), was not a chart success either.

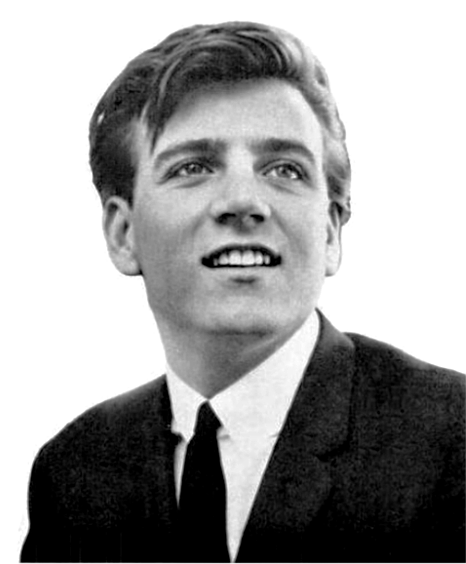
Billy J. Kramer in 1965

After a row with Epstein, Ray Jones left the group in July 1964. Robin MacDonald moved to bass to make way for a new lead guitarist, Mick Green from Johnny Kidd and the Pirates, and the band continued to record with Kramer and under their own name. Maxfield left to concentrate on songwriting in 1965, leaving the Dakotas as a trio, while ex-Pirate Frank Farley (born Frank William Farley, 18 February 1942, Belgaum, British India) replaced Mansfield on drums in 1966. However, the decline of Kramer's career through alcoholism also caused the decline of the Dakotas' career. He parted from the group in September 1967, and the band folded the following year. MacDonald, Green and Farley then joined Cliff Bennett's backing band.

=== Reformed: 1989—2021 ===
The Dakotas re-formed in the late 1980s and recruited vocalist Eddie Mooney and session musician Toni Baker. After original drummer Tony Mansfield left to pursue a career in finance and Mike Maxfield suffered a stroke, drummer Pete Hilton and guitarist Alan Clare were added. In recent years, the band appeared on nostalgia 1960s package tours in their own right, as well as backing artists such as Peter Noone of Herman's Hermits, Wayne Fontana and John Walker of the Walker Brothers. In 2004 the Dakotas worked with British comedian Peter Kay on hit TV series Phoenix Nights and Max and Paddy. Toni Baker co-wrote all the music with Peter Kay.

Maxfield suffered a stroke in August 2004 and left the band, leaving no original Dakotas.

In December 2007, Eddie Mooney was invited to front the Fortunes whose lead singer, Rod Allen died after a sudden illness. This led to him joining the band full-time. In December 2010 the Dakotas gained a new bass player in Marius Jones, and a new frontman in Ronnie Ravey, taking the band back to the original formula of a five-piece outfit.

The Dakotas still tour and record, but none of the members from the 1960s play with the group, although Mike Maxfield, the original guitarist, was still involved behind the scenes. The Dakotas ended in 2021.

=== Years after and Maxfield tribute concert: 2025—2026 ===
Ronnie Ravey died from a heart attack on 10 November 2025.

On 6 December 2025, it was announced that the Dakotas would reform for a one-off gig at the Butlins Skegness' 60s weekend on 3 January 2026, made in honour of Mike Maxfield. The lineup will include Toni Baker and Pete Hilton, plus Eddie Mooney returning from 2007, and new member Robin Hill.

A month after the reunion concert, on 16 February, it was announced on the bands website that the "new" Dakotas would return in January 2027.

== Personnel ==
Frontmen

- Pete Maclaine (February 1962 – January 1963)
- Billy J. Kramer (January 1963 – September 1967)

Former members

- Robin MacDonald – rhythm guitar (September 1960—July 1964), bass (July 1964—1968)
- Tony Mansfield – drums (September 1960—August 1966, 1989—1999)
- Bryn Jones – lead guitar (1960—February 1962)
- Ian Fraser – bass (1960—November 1961)
- Ray Jones – bass (November 1961—July 1964)
- Mike Maxfield – lead guitar (February 1962—1965, 1989—August 2004)
- Mick Green – lead guitar (July 1964—1968)
- Frank Farley – drums (August 1966—1968)
- Toni Baker – keyboards (1989—2021, 2025—2026)
- Eddie Mooney – bass (1989—2007, 2025—2026)
- Richard Benson – lead guitar (August 2004—December 2006)
- Pete Hilton – drums (1999—2021, 2025—2026)
- Alan Clare – lead guitar (December 2006—2021)
- Paul Rafferty – bass guitar (2008—December 2010)
- Marius Jones – bass guitar (December 2010—2021)
- Ronnie Ravey – lead vocals (December 2010—2021)
- Robin Hill – guitar (2025—2026)

== Discography ==
=== Singles ===
Year	Label	A-side	B-side
1963	Parlophone	"The Cruel Sea"	"The Millionaire"
1963	Parlophone	"Magic Carpet"	"Humdinger"
1964	Parlophone	"Oyeh"	"Hallo Josephine"
1967	Page One	"Im 'N 'Ardworkin' Barrow Boy"	"Seven Pounds Of Potatoes"
1968	Philips	"I Can't Break The News To Myself"	"The Spider And The Fly"
2013	Spoke	"Magic Potion"	"The Spider And The Fly"

=== EPs ===
Year	Label	Title	Tracks
1963	Parlophone	Meet The Dakotas	1. "The Cruel Sea"; 2. "The Millionaire"; 3. "Magic Caprtet"; 4. "Humdinger"

=== Singles with Billy J. Kramer ===
- 1963: "Do You Want to Know a Secret" (UK #2)
- 1963: "Bad to Me" (UK #1)
- 1963: "I'll Keep You Satisfied" (UK #4)
- 1964: "Little Children" (UK #1)
- 1964: "From a Window" (UK #10)
- 1965: "It's Gotta Last Forever"
- 1965: "Trains and Boats and Planes" (UK #12)
- 1965: "Neon City"
- 1966: "We’re Doing Fine"
- 1966: "You Make Me Feel Like Someone"

== Additional information ==
- Tony Mansfield (Tony Bookbinder) is the brother of the British vocalist, Elkie Brooks (Elaine Bookbinder).
- Eddie Mooney appeared on PBS television in the U.S. as a member of the Walker Brothers.
- Toni Baker co-wrote all the music with Peter Kay on hit TV series Phoenix Nights and Max and Paddy's Road to Nowhere.
