= Alex Day discography =

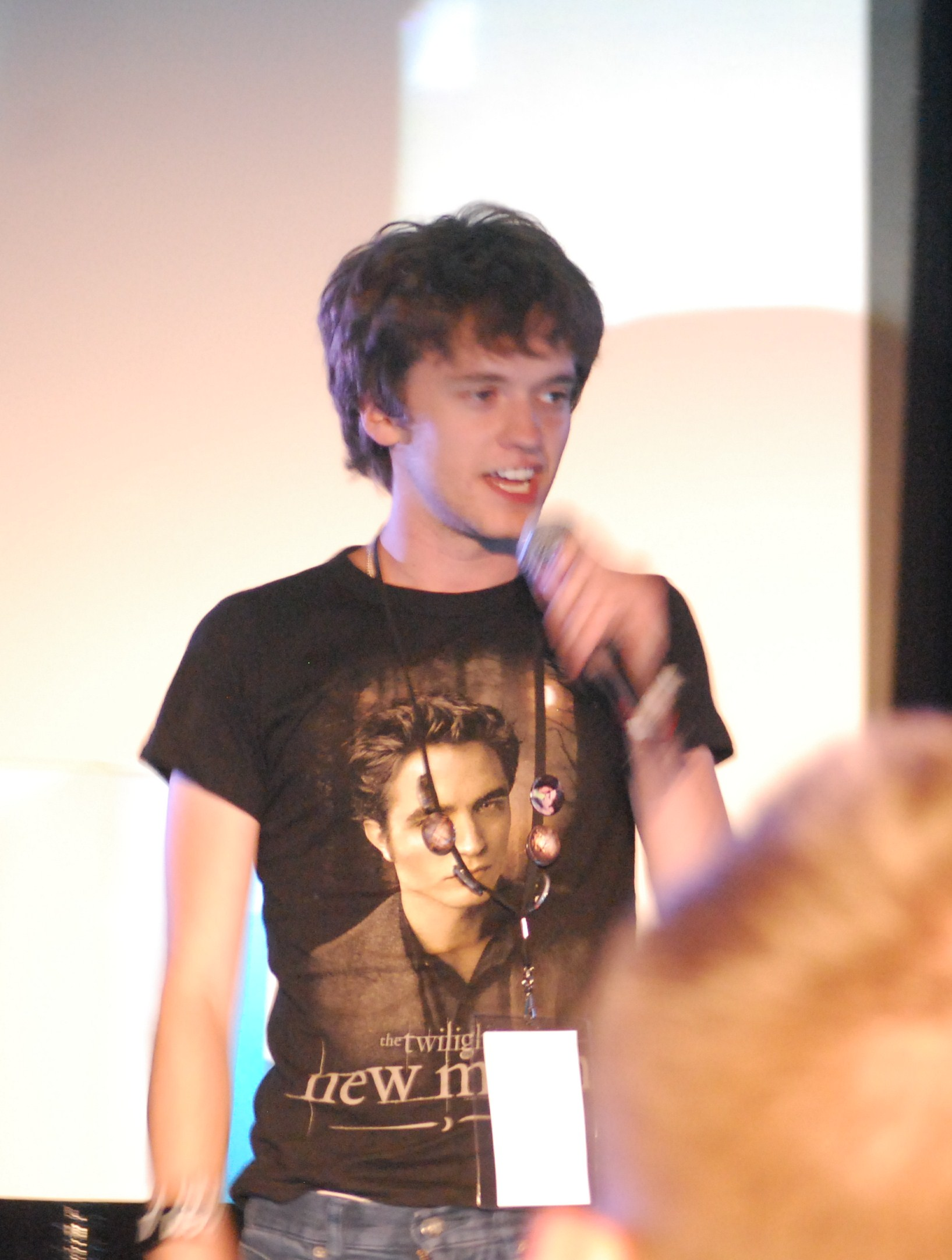
- Day speaking at VidCon in 2010
- Studio albums: 6
- Extended plays: 2
- Singles: 8
- Music videos: 11
- with Chameleon Circuit: 2
- with Sons of Admirals: 1
- Other appearances: 3

The discography of British musician and YouTuber Alex Day consists of nine studio albums, three extended plays, five singles and seven music videos.

== Albums ==
=== Studio albums ===
List of studio albums, with selected chart positions, sales figures and certifications
Title	Album details	Peak chart positions		
Title	Album details	UK	UK Digital	UK Indie
Parrot Stories	Released: 1 October 2009; Label: DFTBA Records; Format: CD, digital download	—	—	—
The World Is Mine (I Don't Know Anything)	Released 28 June 2010; Label: DFTBA Records; Format: CD, digital download	—	—	—
Epigrams and Interludes	Released 17 March 2013; Label: DFTBA Records; Format: CD, digital download	57	29	13
Nowhere Left to Hide	Released 4 October 2015; Label: Self-Released; Format: USB Flash Drive, digital download	—	—	—
Split Infinities	Released 29 September 2016; Label: Self-Released; Format: CD, digital download	—	—	—
Sunset	Released 10 October 2019; Label: Self-Released; Format: digital download	—	—	—
Relax! Nothing Is Under Control!	Released 12 August 2021; Label: Self-Released; Format: digital download	—	—	—
The Stranger	Released 31 March 2026; Label: Self-Released; Format: digital download	—	—	—
The Drop	Released 21 October 2026; Label: Self-Released; Format: digital download			
"—" denotes a recording that did not chart or was not released in that territory.

=== Extended plays ===
Title	Album Details
117% Complete	Released: 1 March 2010; Label: DFTBA Records; Format: CD, digital download
Soup Sessions: Acoustic	Released: 1 November 2010; Label: DFTBA Records; Format: CD, digital download, LP
Shoebox	Released: 9 August 2016; Format: CD, digital download

== Singles ==
Title	Year	Peak chart positions					Album
Title	Year	UK	CAN	IRE	NL	SCO	Album
"Across The Sea"	2011	—	—	—	—	—	Epigrams and Interludes
"Forever Yours"	2011	4	79	20	99	4	Epigrams and Interludes
"Jack & Coke"	2011	—	—	—	—	—	Epigrams and Interludes
"Lady Godiva"	2012	15	—	49	—	16	Epigrams and Interludes
"Good Morning Sunshine"	2012	—	—	—	—	—	Epigrams and Interludes
"She Walks Right Through Me"	2012	—	—	—	—	—	Epigrams and Interludes
"This Kiss" (ft. Carrie Hope Fletcher)	2012	—	—	—	—	—	Epigrams and Interludes
"Stupid Stupid"	2012	25	—	60	—	27	Epigrams and Interludes
"Ugh! Your Ugly Houses"	2015	—	—	—	—	—	
"—" denotes single that did not chart or was not released.

== with Chameleon Circuit ==
Title	Album details	Peak chart positions
Title	Album details	US Heat
Chameleon Circuit	Released: 1 June 2009; Label: DFTBA Records; Formats: CD, digital download	—
Still Got Legs	Released: 12 July 2011; Label: DFTBA Records; Formats: CD, digital download	23
"—" denotes album that did not chart or was not released in that territory

== with Sons of Admirals ==
Title	Released
"Here Comes My Baby" (Single)	31 May 2010
"Here Comes My Baby" (Single) (re-release)	25 October 2010

== Other appearances ==
Title	Artist	Album	Released
Don't Look Back (Demo)	Alex Day	DFTBA Records, Volume 1	1 June 2009
Type 40 (Acoustic)	Chameleon Circuit	Trock On!	6 August 2009
Candy Canes	Alex Day	DFTBA Lullabies	24 January 2010

== As producer ==
Title	Type	Released
Trock On!	Compilation	6 August 2009

== Music videos ==
Year	Music video	Director
2009	"Holding On"	Alex Day
2009	"Don't Look Back"	Alex Day
2010	"Pokémon, What Happened To You?"	Charlotte McDonnell (formerly Charlie McDonnell)
2010	"The Time Of Your Life"	Charlotte McDonnell (formerly Charlie McDonnell)
2011	"Forever Yours"	Charlotte McDonnell (formerly Charlie McDonnell)
2012	"Lady Godiva"	Alex Day
2012	"This Kiss"	Alex Day
2012	"Good Morning Sunshine"	Alex Day
2012	"She Walks Right Through Me"	Alex Day
2012	"Stupid Stupid"	Ciaran O'Brien
2013	"I've Got What It Takes"	Alex Day and Ciaran O'Brien
2013	"Don't Let The World Turn Past Me"	
2016	"Overthinking"	
