= Peter and Gordon discography =

- Studio albums: 14
- EPs: 2
- Compilation albums: 9
- Singles: 21

This is the discography of British pop duo Peter and Gordon.

== Albums ==
=== Studio albums ===
Title	Album details	Peak chart positions	
Title	Album details	UK	US
Peter and Gordon	Released: 5 June 1964; Label: Columbia, Capitol; Formats: LP; Released in the US and Canada as A World without Love	18	21
In Touch with Peter and Gordon	Released: 4 December 1964; Label: Columbia; Formats: LP	—	—
I Don't Want to See You Again	Released: 11 December 1964; Label: Capitol; Formats: LP; US and Canada-only release	—	95
I Go to Pieces	Released: April 1965; Label: Capitol; Formats: LP; US and Canada-only release	—	51
True Love Ways	Released: July 1965; Label: Capitol; Formats: LP; US and Canada-only release	—	49
Hurtin' 'n' Lovin'	Released: 8 October 1965; Label: Columbia; Formats: LP	—	—
Woman	Released: 7 March 1966; Label: Capitol; Formats: LP; US and Canada-only release	—	60
Peter and Gordon	Released: 3 June 1966; Label: Columbia; Formats: LP	—	—
Peter and Gordon Sing and Play the Hits of Nashville, Tennessee	Released: October 1966; Label: Capitol; Formats: LP; US and Canada-only release	—	—
Somewhere...	Released: 9 December 1966; Label: Columbia; Formats: LP	—	—
Lady Godiva	Released: January 1967; Label: Capitol; Formats: LP, 4-track, 8-track; US and Canada-only release	—	80
Knight in Rusty Armour	Released: March 1967; Label: Capitol; Formats: LP; US and Canada-only release	—	—
In London for Tea	Released: July 1967; Label: Capitol; Formats: LP, 4-track; US and Canada-only release	—	—
Hot, Cold & Custard	Released: 5 August 1968; Label: Capitol; Formats: LP, 4-track, 8-track; US and Canada-only release	—	—
"—" denotes releases that did not chart or were not released in that territory.

=== Compilation albums ===
Title	Album details	Peak chart positions
Title	Album details	US
The Best of Peter and Gordon	Released: July 1966; Label: Columbia, Capitol; Formats: LP	72
The Best of Peter and Gordon	Released: 1977; Label: EMI; Formats: LP, MC	—
The Hits and More	Released: January 1986; Label: EMI; Formats: LP	—
Greatest Hits	Released: 1991; Label: CEMA; Formats: CD; US and Canada-only release	—
The Best of the EMI Years	Released: 1991; Label: EMI; Formats: CD	—
The Best of Peter & Gordon	Released: August 1991; Label: Rhino; Formats: CD, MC; US-only release	—
The EP Collection	Released: September 1995; Label: See for Miles; Formats: CD	—
The Ultimate Peter & Gordon	Released: November 2001; Label: EMI; Formats: CD	—
The Definitive Collection – A World Without Love	Released: March 2003; Label: Collectables; Formats: 3xCD box set; US-only release	—
"—" denotes releases that did not chart or were not released in that territory.

== EPs ==
Title (Note: This is a list of EPs released in the UK. Various other EPs were released elsewhere.)	Album details	Peak chart positions
Title	Album details	UK
Just for You	Released: May 1964; Label: Columbia; Formats: 7"	20
Nobody I Know	Released: 24 July 1964; Label: Columbia; Formats: 7"	—
"—" denotes releases that did not chart.

== Singles ==
Title (A-side, B-side)	Year	Peak chart positions										UK Album	US Album
Title (A-side, B-side)	Year	UK	AUS	CAN	IRE	NL	NOR	NZ	SWE	US	US AC	UK Album	US Album
"A World Without Love" b/w "If I Were You"	1964	1	2	2	1	—	8	1	5	1	—	Peter and Gordon	A World Without Love
"Nobody I Know" b/w "You Don't Have to Tell Me"	1964	10	9	9	8	—	—	—	—	12	—	A: Non-album track B: Peter and Gordon	A: I Don't Want to See You Again; B: A World Without Love
"I Don't Want to See You Again" b/w "I Would Buy You Presents"	1964	—	28	17	—	—	—	—	—	16	9	A: In Touch with Peter and Gordon; B: Non-album track	A: I Don't Want to See You Again; B: Knight in Rusty Armour
"I Go to Pieces" b/w "Love Me Baby"	1964	—	26	21	—	—	—	—	11	9	—	Non-album singles	A: I Go to Pieces; B: I Don't Want to See You Again
"True Love Ways" b/w "If You Wish"	1965	2	22	3	4	9	10	—	13	14	—	Non-album singles	A: True Love Ways; B: I Go to Pieces
"To Know You Is to Love You" b/w "I Told You So"	1965	5	39	5	5	— (Note: "To Know You Is to Love You" didn't enter the Dutch Single Top 10, but did peak at number 20 on the Dutch Top 40.)	—	—	—	24	—	Non-album singles	True Love Ways
"Baby I'm Yours" b/w "When the Black of Your Eyes Turn to Grey"	1965	19	—	—	—	—	—	—	—	—	—	A: Non-album track B: Hurtin' 'n' Lovin'	A: Lady Godiva; B: True Love Ways
"Don't Pity Me" (US and Canada-only release) b/w "Crying in the Rain"	1965	—	—	—	—	—	—	—	—	83	—	Hurtin' 'n' Lovin'	True Love Ways
"Woman" b/w "Wrong from the Start"	1966	28	12	1	—	15	—	7	19	14	—	Peter and Gordon (1966)	Woman
"There's No Living Without Your Loving" (US, Canada and Australia-only release) b/w "A Stranger with a Black Dove"	1966	—	71	26	—	—	—	—	—	50 130	—	Peter and Gordon (1966)	A: Woman; B: Knight in Rusty Armour
"To Show I Love You" b/w "Don't Pity Me" (UK); "Start Trying Someone Else" (US)	1966	—	—	59	—	—	—	—	—	98	—	A: Non-album track UK B: Hurtin' 'n' Lovin'; US B: Peter and Gordon (1966)	A: Knight in Rusty Armour; UK B: True Love Ways; US B: Lady Godiva
"Lady Godiva" b/w "Morning's Calling" (UK and second US pressings); "The Town I Live In" (first US pressings)	1966	16	1	1	—	— (Note: "Lady Godiva" didn't enter the Dutch Single Top 20, but did peak at number 30 on the Dutch Top 40.)	—	1	19	6	—	A: Non-album track UK and 2nd US B: Peter and Gordon (1966); 1st US B: Non-album track	A and 2nd US B: Lady Godiva; 1st US B: Non-album track
"Knight in Rusty Armour" b/w "The Flower Lady"	1966	57 (Note: Chart position is from the official UK "Breakers List".)	5	3	—	— (Note: "Knight in Rusty Armour" didn't enter the Dutch Single Top 20, but did peak at number 31 on the Dutch Top 40.)	—	5	—	15	—	Non-album singles	Knight in Rusty Armour
"Il messaggio (Morning's Calling)" (Italy-only release) b/w "Che cos'è una rosa (The Flower Lady)"	1967	—	—	—	—	—	—	—	—	—	—	Non-album singles	Non-album single
"Sunday for Tea" b/w "Start Trying Someone Else" (UK); "Hurtin' Is Lovin'" (US)	1967	—	26	13	—	—	—	14	—	31	34	A: Non-album track UK B: Peter and Gordon (1966); US B: Hurtin' Is Lovin'	A: In London for Tea; UK B: Lady Godiva; US B: True Love Ways
"Liebe, Glück und Treue" (Germany and Netherlands-only release) b/w "Wunder"	1967	—	—	—	—	—	—	—	—	—	—	Non-album singles	Non-album single
"The Jokers" b/w "Red, Cream and Velvet"	1967	—	—	88	—	—	—	—	—	97	—	Non-album singles	In London for Tea
"Never Ever" b/w "Greener Days"	1967	—	—	77	—	—	—	—	—	—	—	Non-album singles	Hot Cold & Custard
"I Feel Like Going Out" b/w "The Quest for the Holy Grail"	1968	—	—	—	—	—	—	—	—	—	—	Non-album singles	Hot Cold & Custard
"You've Had Better Times" b/w "Sipping My Wine"	1968	—	—	46	—	—	—	—	—	118	—	Non-album singles	Hot Cold & Custard
"I Can Remember (Not Too Long Ago)" b/w "Hard Time, Rainy Day"	1969	—	—	—	—	—	—	—	—	—	—	Non-album singles	Non-album single
"—" denotes releases that did not chart or were not released in that territory.
