= Epigrams and Interludes =

Studio album by Alex Day
- Released: 17 March 2013
- Genres: Synth-pop, acoustic, electronic
- Length: 63:32

Alex Day chronology
117% Complete (2010)	Epigrams and Interludes (2013)	Nowhere Left to Hide (2015)

Epigrams and Interludes is the third album released by Alex Day, a musician and YouTuber from Essex, England. The album includes the single "Forever Yours," which made it to No. 4 on the UK Top 40 after selling more than 50,000 copies in one week when released in 2011, and was released 17 March 2013.

== Release ==
Epigrams and Interludes is a 20 song collection and contains all previously released songs since "Forever Yours" not collected on Day's previous albums. Besides this, two songs of the album, "The Time of Your Life" and "Holding On" are from Day's previous albums. Three of the songs, "Forever Yours", "Lady Godiva", and "Stupid Stupid" all debuted on the UK Top 40 when released. They reached No. 4, #15, and No. 25 respectively. As part of the album, Day released a music video for "I've Got What It Takes" starring Tom Ridgewell, Carrie Hope Fletcher as well as a host of other YouTubers.

Day partnered with the file sharing service BitTorrent for an exclusive bundle with the release of Epigrams and Interludes. The package was downloaded more than 1 million times in the first week of release.

== Reception ==
The album debuted at No. 2 on the UK iTunes charts, beating Justin Timberlake's release The 20/20 Experience. The Examiner claimed the album to be just as 'delightful and jaunty' as Day and praised the album for its '80s New Wave and '60s music' sound.

== Music videos ==
The video for "She Walks Right Through Me" was shot in 2012. It shows the story between Alex Day and his imaginary girlfriend who "appears from nowhere". Also it has scenes with Alex Day walking away from hooligans and dancing on a rolling background of rainbow colours during the chorus. At the middle of the video the girl comes to Day's house and then she appears with him on portraits and videos. At the last seconds the girl is sucked in a vacuum cleaner while Alex Day is vacuuming the kitchen.

== Track listing ==
All tracks are written by Alex Day, except where noted.

No.	Title	Writer(s)	Length
1.	"Forever Yours"		2:48
2.	"Here Comes Trouble"		3:55
3.	"Stupid Stupid"	Alex Day, Kenneth King	2:46
4.	"The Time of Your Life"	Day, Tom Milsom	3:00
5.	"Across the Sea (feat. Tom Milsom)"	Day, Milsom	3:29
6.	"Bread"	Charlotte McDonnell (formerly Charlie McDonnell)	3:27
7.	"Don't Let the World Turn Past Me"		3:53
8.	"Poison (feat. Carrie Hope Fletcher)"	Desmond Child, Alice Cooper, John McCurry	4:04
9.	"Lady Godiva"	Mike Leander, Charlie Mills, Gordon Mills	2:26
10.	"Under the Sea (feat. Bryarly Bishop)"	Alan Menken, Howard Ashman	3:18
11.	"Jack and Coke"		3:06
12.	"She Walks Right Through Me"	Mick Lister, James Matthews, Zack Wilkinson, Joshua Wilkinson	2:56
13.	"Wish for is You"		2:52
14.	"This Kiss (feat. Carrie Hope Fletcher)"	Beth Nielsen Chapman, Robin Lerner, Annie Roboff	2:51
15.	"Oh No! I'm in Love :("		2:56
16.	"Holding On"		2:52
17.	"Losing a Future"		2:57
18.	"Good Morning Sunshine"		3:29
19.	"Wannabe a Star"		3:42
20.	"I've Got What It Takes"		2:55
Total length:			63:32
