= Heathers =

1989 film by Michael Lehmann

- Theatrical release poster
- Directed by: Michael Lehmann
- Written by: Daniel Waters
- Produced by: Denise Di Novi
- Starring: Winona Ryder; Christian Slater; Shannen Doherty
- Cinematography: Francis Kenny
- Edited by: Norman Hollyn
- Music by: David Newman
- Production company: Cinemarque Entertainment
- Distributed by: New World Pictures
- Release dates: October 24, 1988 (Italy): January 21, 1989 (Sundance); March 31, 1989 (United States)
- Running time: 103 minutes
- Country: United States
- Language: English
- Budget: $3 million
- Box office: $1.1 million

Heathers is a 1988 American satirical teen film written by Daniel Waters and directed by Michael Lehmann, in both of their respective film debuts. The film stars Winona Ryder, Christian Slater, Shannen Doherty, Lisanne Falk, Kim Walker and Penelope Milford. It follows downtrodden high school student Veronica Sawyer—the only girl of her school clique not to be named Heather—who falls in love with Jason "J.D." Dean, a misanthropic newcomer intent on murdering the popular students and staging their deaths as suicides.

Waters wrote Heathers as a spec script and originally wanted Stanley Kubrick to direct the film, out of admiration for Kubrick's own black comedy film Dr. Strangelove. Waters intended the film to contrast the optimistic teen movies of the era, particularly those written by John Hughes, by presenting a cynical depiction of high school imbued with dark satire.

Filmed in Los Angeles in July 1988, Heathers premiered in Milan, Italy in the fall of 1988 before making its way to the Sundance Film Festival on January 21, 1989, then New World Pictures theatrically released the film in the United States on March 31, 1989. It went on to win the Independent Spirit Award for Best First Feature, and for his screenplay, Waters received the Edgar Allan Poe Award for Best Motion Picture Screenplay. It has since become popular and is regarded in polls as one of the greatest coming-of-age films of all time. Heathers has since been adapted into a musical and a television reboot.

== Plot ==
At Westerburg High School in Sherwood, Ohio, Veronica Sawyer is part of a popular-but-feared clique that includes three wealthy and beautiful girls with the same first name: Heather Duke, Heather McNamara, and the ruthless queen bee, Heather Chandler. Tired of the clique abusing its power, Veronica longs for her old life with her kinder but less popular friends. She becomes fascinated with new student Jason "J.D." Dean after he pulls out a gun and fires blanks to scare football-player bullies, Kurt and Ram. Outsider J.D., whose mother committed suicide, has a strained relationship with his explosives-obsessed demolition mogul father.

Veronica goes with Chandler to a frat party at Remington University, where she refuses to have sex with one member, unlike Chandler, who is coerced into performing oral sex. When Veronica drunkenly vomits on Chandler, Chandler vows to destroy Veronica's reputation in retaliation. Later, J.D. breaks into Veronica's house through her bedroom window, and they have sex. They express to each other their mutual hatred of Chandler's tyranny.

The next morning, Veronica and J.D. break into Chandler's house, planning revenge by using a fake hangover cure to make Chandler vomit. Veronica mixes orange juice and milk into a mug, but J.D. pours a mug full of drain cleaner, which Veronica accidentally grabs, mistakenly killing Chandler. Veronica is horrified by the accident, but J.D. urges her to forge a dramatic suicide note in Chandler's handwriting. The community regards Chandler's apparent suicide as a tragic decision made by a troubled teenager, making her even more worshipped in death than in life. Duke uses the attention surrounding Chandler's death to gain popularity by going to many different news stations, feeling the need to be the clique's new leader.

McNamara later convinces Veronica to go with her, Kurt, and Ram on a double date. J.D. finds the four teens that evening in a field, and Veronica leaves with him as Kurt passes out, while Ram rapes McNamara. The boys spread a false rumor about Veronica performing oral sex on them, ruining her reputation. J.D. proposes that he and Veronica lure the boys into the woods, shoot them with tranquilizers, and humiliate them by staging the scene to look like they were lovers participating in a suicide pact. In the forest, J.D. shoots Ram, but Veronica's shot misses Kurt, who runs away. J.D. chases Kurt back toward Veronica, who, realizing that the bullets are in fact lethal, fatally shoots him in a panic. At their funeral, the boys are made into martyrs to homophobia. Horrified that J.D. is murdering students he dislikes, Veronica breaks up with him.

J.D. grooms Duke into becoming the new queen bee of the clique. He blackmails Duke into getting every student to sign a petition that, unbeknownst to her, is intended to act as a mass suicide note. Martha, an overweight and oft-bullied girl, attempts to kill herself by walking into traffic. She survives but is badly injured and mocked by her peers who believe she was attempting to copy the popular kids. McNamara calls a radio show to discuss her depression. Duke tells the entire school about the radio call, leading to McNamara being bullied. McNamara attempts suicide by overdosing in the girls' bathroom, but Veronica intervenes.

Veronica returns home, where her parents inform her that J.D. stopped by, proclaiming that he is worried she will attempt suicide. Realizing that J.D. plans to kill her, she fakes her own suicide by hanging. J.D. finds her and, assuming she is dead, gives a monologue revealing his plan to blow up the school pep rally and frame it as a suicide pact.

J.D. plants dynamite in the gymnasium equipped with remote detonators. He proceeds to the school's boiler room to place dynamite with a countdown detonator. Veronica confronts J.D. in the boiler room and shoots him, resulting in him accidentally cutting the wires to the detonator with his switchblade. Veronica goes outside, and J.D. follows her with a bomb strapped to his chest. He offers a personal eulogy and detonates the bomb, killing himself. As students and faculty rush to see what happened, Veronica walks back inside, disheveled and covered in soot from the explosion. She confronts and condemns Duke, then invites Martha to spend prom night watching movies together.

== Cast ==
- Winona Ryder as Veronica Sawyer
- Christian Slater as Jason "J.D." Dean
- Shannen Doherty as Heather Duke
- Lisanne Falk as Heather McNamara
- Kim Walker as Heather Chandler
- Renée Estevez as Betty Finn
- Carrie Lynn as Martha Dunnstock
- Penelope Milford as Pauline Fleming
- Glenn Shadix as Father Ripper
- Lance Fenton as Kurt Kelly
- Patrick Labyorteaux as Ram Sweeney
- Jeremy Applegate as Peter Dawson

== Production ==
=== Development ===
Daniel Waters began writing the screenplay in spring of 1986, while he was working at a video store. He wanted the film to be directed by Stanley Kubrick, not only out of admiration for him, but also from a perception that "Kubrick was the only person that could get away with a three-hour film". The cafeteria scene near the start of Heathers was written as a homage to the barracks scene which opens Kubrick's Full Metal Jacket. After a number of failed attempts to get the script to Kubrick, Waters approached director Michael Lehmann, whom he met through a mutual friend. Lehmann agreed to helm the film with producer Denise Di Novi.

In the original version of the script, Jason "J.D." Dean successfully blows up Westerburg High, and the final scene features a surreal prom gathering of all the students in heaven. Executives at New World Pictures agreed to finance the film but they disliked the dark ending and insisted that it be changed. Some reviewers have discussed similarities between Heathers and Massacre at Central High, a low-budget 1976 film. Daniel Waters has stated that he had not seen Massacre at Central High at the time he wrote Heathers but that he had read a review of it in Cult Movies 2, a Danny Peary book about cult movies and that the earlier film may have been "rattling around somewhere in my subconscious".

=== Casting ===
Many actors and actresses turned down the project because of its dark subject matter. Early choices for Veronica Sawyer were Justine Bateman and Jennifer Connelly. Winona Ryder, who was 15 at the time and turned 16 during filming, had begged Waters to cast her as Veronica and wanted the part so badly that she offered to work for free. Waters initially did not think she was "pretty enough" and later said that his first reaction was, "The girl from Lucas? She's just not attractive!" Ryder herself commented in 2014, "At the time, I didn't look that different from my character in Beetlejuice. I was very pale. I had blue-black dyed hair. I went to Macy's at the Beverly Center and had them do a makeover on me."

Ryder's agent was opposed to her taking the role and believed that it would ruin Ryder's career, even getting down on her hands and knees to beg Ryder not to take it. She was eventually given the role and later parted ways with her agent. Brad Pitt read for the role of J.D. but was unsuccessful. Christian Slater reported throwing a "big tantrum" and tossing his script in the trash after assuming he had botched his audition. He was cast as J.D. shortly after Ryder joined the film, later stating that he channeled Jack Nicholson in the film.

Heather Graham, then 17, was offered the part of Heather Chandler but turned it down due to her parents' disapproval of the film. Kim Walker, who was dating Slater, was offered the role instead. Lisanne Falk, 23 years old at the time, lied and said she was in her late teens during the audition. It was only after she was cast that she revealed her true age. 17-year-old Shannen Doherty wanted the role of Veronica but Ryder had been cast, so the producers asked her to audition for Heather Chandler. She was more interested in playing Heather Duke and ended up giving an "amazing" reading as Duke, which secured her the part. The producers wanted her to dye her hair blonde to match the other "Heathers", but she refused, so they compromised on her having red hair.

=== Filming ===
Principal photography took place over 33 days beginning in July 1988, on a budget of $3 million. Although set in Ohio, filming was done entirely in Los Angeles. "Westerburg High School" is an amalgamation of Corvallis High School, now Bridges Academy, in Studio City, Verdugo Hills High School in Tujunga and John Adams Middle School in Santa Monica. The gymnasium scenes were shot at Verdugo Hills High, and the climactic scene on the stairs was filmed outside John Adams Middle School. The funeral scenes were filmed at Church of the Angels in Pasadena, California, a location also used in Buffy the Vampire Slayer and Just Married.

Michael Lehmann has called Doherty "a bit of a handful" on set, in part because she objected to the swearing in the script and refused to say some of the more explicit lines. Falk stated that Doherty "didn't have much of a sense of humor, and she took herself a little seriously", and Di Novi said: "I don't think Shannen really got what Heathers was. And that worked for us. She made that character real." When the cast first viewed the film, Doherty ran out crying because she realized the film was a dark comedy and not the drama she was expecting.

== Soundtrack ==
The film uses two versions of the song "Que Sera, Sera", the first by singer Syd Straw and another over the end credits by Sly and the Family Stone. On the film's DVD commentary, Di Novi mentions that the filmmakers wanted to use the original Doris Day version of the song but Day would not lend her name to any project using profanity.

The song "Teenage Suicide (Don't Do It)" by the fictional band Big Fun was written and produced for the film by musician Don Dixon and performed by the ad hoc group "Big Fun", which consisted of Dixon, Mitch Easter, Angie Carlson and Marti Jones. The song is included on Dixon's 1992 greatest hits album (If) I'm a Ham, Well You're a Sausage.

The film's electronic score was composed and performed by David Newman and a soundtrack CD was subsequently released.

== Release ==
=== Box office ===
Heathers premiered in Milan, Italy, in the fall of 1988, then was screened at the Sundance Film Festival on January 21, 1989, and was released to the U.S. public in March 1989, at which time New World Pictures was going bankrupt. The film was considered a failure when it was released, earning $177,247 in its opening weekend and ultimately grossing $1.1 million in the United States over five weeks.

=== Home media ===
New World Video released Heathers on VHS and LaserDisc in 1989. It developed a cult following after being unsuccessful at the box office. It was released again on LaserDisc in September 1996, as a widescreen edition digitally transferred from Trans Atlantic Entertainment's interpositive print under the supervision of cinematographer Francis Kenny. The sound was mastered from the magnetic sound elements. The film was released on DVD in March 1999, in a barebones edition.

In 2001, a multi-region special edition THX-certified DVD was released from Anchor Bay Entertainment in Dolby Digital 5.1. The DVD contained an audio commentary with director Michael Lehmann, producer Denise Di Novi and writer Daniel Waters, as well as a 30-minute documentary titled Swatch Dogs and Diet Cokeheads, featuring interviews with Ryder, Slater, Doherty, Falk, Lehmann, Waters, Di Novi, director of photography Francis Kenny and editor Norman Hollyn. The DVD was released in the United States, Canada, Australia, and Europe, and achieved high sales. Each release included a different front cover featuring Veronica, J.D., Chandler, Duke and McNamara.

The Anchor Bay DVD was also released in a "Limited Edition Tin Set" of 15,000 copies. The Tin Set included a theatrical trailer, screenplay excerpt, original ending, biographies, a 10-page full-color fold-out with photos and liner notes, an 8-inch "Heathers Rules!" ruler, and a 48-page full-color yearbook-style booklet with rare photos. The film was then re-released on Blu-ray by Image Entertainment in 2011 as a barebones edition, two years after Anchor Bay.

In July 2008, a new 20th anniversary special edition DVD set was released by Anchor Bay to coincide with the DVD of writer Waters' 2007 film Sex and Death 101. The DVD features a new documentary, Return to Westerburg High. In November 2008, Anchor Bay released a Blu-ray with all the special features from the 20th anniversary DVD and a soundtrack in Dolby TrueHD 5.1.

Arrow Films released Heathers in the United Kingdom on Ultra HD Blu-ray on August 5, 2018, and in cinemas on September 10, based on a new 4K restoration of the film. In November 2019, Image Entertainment released a 30th anniversary steelbook edition on Blu-ray. This release did not utilize Arrow Films' 4K restoration and featured new and previous special features.

== Critical reception ==
=== Initial reviews ===
Contemporary reviews of Heathers were generally positive. Writing in April 1989 for The Washington Post, journalist Desson Thomson wrote that it "may be the nastiest, cruelest fun you can have without actually having to study law or gird leather products. If movies were food, Heathers would be a cynic's chocolate binge." Chicago Sun-Times film critic Roger Ebert gave the film 2.5 stars out of 4 and wrote that Heathers "is a morbid comedy about peer pressure in high school, about teenage suicide and about the deadliness of cliques that not only exclude but also maim and kill." While conceding its ability to provoke thought and shock, Ebert questioned how the mixed sensibility as a dark murder comedy and "cynical morality play" led to difficulty in understanding its point of view, while remarking that, "Adulthood could be defined as the process of learning to be shocked by things that do not shock teenagers, but that is not a notion that has occurred to Lehmann."

=== Retrospective responses ===
On the review aggregator website Rotten Tomatoes, 95% of 57 critics' reviews are positive, with an average rating of 7.9/10. The website's consensus reads: "Dark, cynical, and subversive, Heathers gently applies a chainsaw to the conventions of the high school movie—changing the game for teen comedies to follow." Metacritic, which uses a weighted average, assigned the film a score of 72 out of 100, based on 20 critics, indicating "generally favorable" reviews.

Teen film scholar Timothy Shary posits Heathers as influential for the subsequent satirical engagement with the trope of popularity: "Heathers turns the otherwise serious high school business of popularity into a farce, and that is exactly what films of the '90s continued to do with the roles of popular female school characters. Buffy the Vampire Slayer (1992), Clueless (1995), Jawbreaker and Election (both 1999) all feature popular school girls who are at once dedicated to maintaining their accepted image but who struggle (or fail) to recognize the contradictions and ironies of their position. The films thereby become parodies of popularity, although only Clueless and Election offer the same wide social scope as Heathers."

Waters created a specific set of slang and style of speech for the film, wanting to ensure that the language in the film would have "timeless" quality instead of just reflecting teen slang at the time. As of 2014, the film was among the most cited in the Oxford English Dictionary.

=== Legacy and influence ===
Scholars have situated Heathers within late-20th-century "culture war" depictions of youth, noting its role in reframing popularity as an object of satire rather than aspiration. The film's decidedly stylized use of contemporaneous slang has also been recognized as a factor influencing the film's lasting cultural footprint; it is among the most frequently cited films in the Oxford English Dictionary for first attestations of lines and idioms.

== Related projects ==
=== Possible film sequel ===
On June 2, 2009, Entertainment Weekly reported that Ryder had claimed that there would be a sequel to the film, titled Heathers 2, with Slater coming back "as a kind of Obi-Wan character". However, Lehmann denied development of a sequel, saying, "Winona's been talking about this for years—she brings it up every once in a while and Dan Waters and I will joke about it, but as far as I know there's no script and no plans to do the sequel." In 2024, Daniel Waters revealed that he had concocted a story for the sequel where Veronica becomes a page for a presidential candidate named Heather, who would have been played by Meryl Streep. The film would have ended with Veronica assassinating her and getting away with it.

=== Musical ===
In 2010, Heathers was adapted into a stage musical directed by Andy Fickman. Fickman also worked on the musical Reefer Madness, a parody of the anti-cannabis movie of the same name which was turned into a feature film. Heathers: The Musical, which opens with a number depicting Veronica's acceptance into the Heathers' clique, received several readings in workshops in Los Angeles and a three-show concert presentation at Joe's Pub in New York City on September 13–14, 2010. The cast of the Joe's Pub concert included Annaleigh Ashford as Veronica, Jenna Leigh Green as Heather Chandler and Jeremy Jordan as J.D.

The musical played at Off-Broadway's New World Stages with performances beginning March 15, 2014, and an opening night on March 31. The original cast of the Off-Broadway production included Barrett Wilbert Weed as Veronica Sawyer, Jessica Keenan Wynn as Heather Chandler, Ryan McCartan as J.D., Alice Lee as Heather Duke and Elle McLemore as Heather McNamara. It closed on August 4, 2014.

An Off West End production of Heathers, directed by Andy Fickman, played at the Other Palace in London with performances between June 19 and August 4, 2018. Its cast included Carrie Hope Fletcher as Veronica Sawyer, Jodie Steele as Heather Chandler, Jamie Muscato as J.D., T'Shan Williams as Heather Duke and Sophie Isaacs as Heather McNamara. It transferred to the West End in September 2018, playing in Theatre Royal Haymarket, London. A high school production of the musical is the focus of the third season "Chapter Fifty-One: Big Fun" episode of Riverdale.

In 2021, Heathers returned for a limited run at the Haymarket with Christina Bennington playing Veronica Sawyer and Jordan Luke Gage as J.D. The three Heathers were played by Jodie Steele (Heather Chandler), Bobbi Little (Heather Duke) and Frances Mayli McCann (Heather McNamara). It then went on to play at The Other Palace until 3 September 2023. In 2025, it was announced that an Off-Broadway revival of Heathers would play June–September 2025 at New World Stages in Manhattan, New York. The show's run was subsequently extended, with a current closing date of November 8, 2026.

=== Television adaptation ===
In March 2016, TV Land ordered a pilot script for an anthology dark comedy series, set in the present day, with a very different Veronica Sawyer dealing with a very different but equally vicious group of Heathers. The series was written by Jason Micallef and Tom Rosenberg, and Gary Lucchesi was the executive producer. In January 2017, the Heathers TV show was ordered to series at TV Land. Shannen Doherty, the movie's Heather Duke, makes a cameo appearance in the pilot.

In March 2017, it was reported that the series was moved to the then upcoming Paramount Network. Selma Blair has a recurring role in the series. A trailer for the rebooted series was released in August 2017. The series stars Grace Victoria Cox as Veronica Sawyer, James Scully as J.D., Melanie Field as Heather Chandler, Brendan Scannell as Heather Duke, Jasmine Mathews as Heather McNamara, Birgundi Baker as Lizzy and Cameron Gellman as Kurt Kelly. The series was set to premiere on March 7, 2018. On February 28, 2018, it was announced that the premiere would be delayed in light of the Stoneman Douglas High School shooting. Coverage at the time framed the postponement in relation to U.S. school-shooting sensitivities, with network statements citing the Parkland context in explaining the scheduling decision.

== See also ==
- List of cult films
