= Versioning =

Versioning may refer to:

- Version control, the management of changes to documents, computer programs, large web sites, and other collections of information
- Versioning file system, which allows a computer file to exist in several versions at the same time
- Software versioning, the process of assigning either unique version names or numbers to unique states of computer software

== See also ==
- Version (disambiguation)
