= Stupid (disambiguation) =

Stupid refers to stupidity, a lack of intelligence.

Stupid may also refer to:

- Stupid (art movement), a group of artists in Cologne, Germany, in the 1920s
- Stupid!, a UK children's television show on CBBC
- Stupid, the twenty-ninth chapter of Wayside School Gets A Little Stranger

== Songs ==
- "Stupid" (Ashnikko song), 2019
- "Stupid" (Sarah McLachlan song), 2004
- "Stupid", by Aitana from Tráiler, 2018
- "Stupid", by Brockhampton from Saturation III, 2017
- "Stupid", by G Flip from About Us, 2019
- "Stupid", by the Game from Drillmatic – Heart vs. Mind, 2022
- "Stupid", by Hyoyeon from Deep, 2022
- "Stupid", by Kacey Musgraves from Same Trailer Different Park, 2013
- "Stupid", by Per Gessle from The World According to Gessle, 1997
- "Stupid", by Playaz Circle from Flight 360: The Takeoff, 2009
- "Stupid", by Raven-Symoné from Raven-Symoné, 2008
- "Stupid", by Tate McRae from All the Things I Never Said, 2020

== See also ==
- "Stupid Stupid", a single by English musician Alex Day
- "Stupid Song", a 2026 single by Olivia Rodrigo from the album You Seem Pretty Sad for a Girl So in Love
- The Stupids, a fictional family in a series of books by Harry Allard and James Marshall
- The Stupids (film), a 1996 comedy/adventure film based on the family
- The Stupids (band), a hardcore punk band
- Stoopid (disambiguation)
