= Veronica Sawyer =

Fictional character from Heathers

- Heathers character
- Winona Ryder portraying the character in the 1988 film
- First appearance: Heathers
- Last appearance: Heathers (TV series)
- Created by: Daniel Waters
- Portrayed by: Winona Ryder (1988 film); Barrett Wilbert Weed (Los Angeles 2013, Off-Broadway); Charlotte Wakefied (West End Production); Carrie Hope Fletcher (West End Production); Grace Victoria Cox (2018 series)

In-universe information
- Nicknames: Ronnie 'Ronica
- Gender: Female
- Occupation: Student at Westerburg
- Affiliation: The Heathers (formerly)
- Family: Anne Sawyer (mother); Kevin Sawyer (father)
- Significant others: Jason "JD" Dean (formerly, ex-boyfriend)

Veronica Sawyer is the female protagonist in the cult-classic film, Heathers. Despite not being named Heather, Veronica becomes part of "The Heathers", a popular clique of three Westerburg High students sharing the name Heather. She is romantically involved with Jason "JD" Dean, a new student and the male protagonist.

Veronica is portrayed by Winona Ryder in the original film, Grace Victoria Cox in the 2018 series, and originated on stage by Barrett Wilbert Weed in the musical production.

== Biography ==
When Veronica was in 6th grade, she had a high IQ and her parents wanted to move her up to high school, but didn't, as it would have been hard for her to make friends.

When Veronica started high school, she was a former unpopular kid in Westerburg High. In the original film, she was originally close friends with Betty Finn (who doesn't appear in the musical), until she joined the Heathers.

== Personality ==
Veronica is a young woman. She seems to have maturity beyond her years as she may come off as rude, but that is due to people in Westerburg being more concerned for their reputation than their smartness. She is very upfront with people.

== Role in Heathers ==
In the film, Veronica joins a clique known as "The Heathers" consisting of three girls named Heather: Heather Duke, Heather McNamara, and the leader, Heather Chandler. Veronica longs for nicer friends that don't strike terror. She gets fascinated by a new kid, Jason "JD" Dean, after he shoots blanks at two jocks, Ram Sweeney and Kurt Kelly.

Later in the movie, Veronica and Heather C. go to a fraternity party, where Veronica meets JD in a gas station when they stop to get Heather C. her corn nuts. JD buys Veronica a slushie, and she leaves. In the frat party, Veronica is uncomfortable and she drunkenly vomits on Heather C., who plans to ruin her life in revenge.

After that, Veronica is in her room when JD comes in her house through the window. The two play strip croquet and have sex. The next morning, they go to Heather C.'s house, seeking revenge by making her a hangover cure that will make her "Spew Red, White, and Blue". Veronica makes a glass of milk mixed with orange juice, while JD pours a mug of drain cleaner, which Veronica is against. When JD distracts Veronica, she grabs the drain cleaner mug by mistake and gives it to Heather Chandler. They tell her it is a hangover cure, which she believes, and she dies after drinking it. Veronica panics, and JD tells her to forge her writing and write a suicide note, which everyone believes. Heather Duke becomes the new leader of The Heathers.

Heather McNamara and Veronica go on a double date with Ram and Kurt, but leaves with J.D in the middle of it. Ram and Kurt spread a false rumor about Veronica, so JD and Veronica lead them to the woods, and shoot them with bullets Veronica believes to be tranquilizers. Kurt and Ram die with everyone believing it was a suicide pact due to homophobia. Veronica breaks up with JD for all this, seeing that he isn't a good person.

Heather Duke and Veronica hear a call in their radio show by Heather McNamara going by "Tweety". Duke embarrasses McNamara, which leads her to nearly overdose on pills, but Veronica intervenes and talks her out of it.

Veronica returns home, and her parents said that JD told them that he was worried she was going to commit suicide. Veronica realizes JD plans to kill her, so she fakes a suicide by hanging. When JD finds her, he assumes she is dead, and plans to blow up the school pep rally.

JD starts the bomb, and Veronica comes to confront him. She shoots him and closes the bomb. JD comes with the bomb strapped to himself. He kills himself, and the school rushes to see what happens, Veronica walks back, untidy due to the explosion. She takes the red scrunchie from Duke and tells her she is not in charge. Veronica and Martha Dunnstock watch movies together on prom night.

== Role in the musical ==
Veronica's role in the musical is the same. The songs Veronica sings in the musical include "Beautiful", "Fight For Me", "Big Fun," "Dead Girl Walking" and its reprise, "The Me inside of Me", "Our Love is God", "Prom or Hell?", "Seventeen", and "I am Damaged". In the West End version of Heathers: the Musical, she also sings “I Say No” and has a few lines in “You’re Welcome”.

Among her interpreters on stage are the actresses Kuhoo Verma, Lorna Courtney and Isabella Esler.

== Legacy ==
Veronica is considered to be one of Winona Ryder's most notable roles, but she was urged by her agent not to play her due to the film's dark themes.

She is considered to be strong and complex and challenges high school cliques and norms.

Australian pop-duo The Veronicas, consisting of identical twins Lisa Origliasso and Jessica Origliasso, named themselves after Veronica Sawyer.

Long Island 3rd Wave Ska band Edna’s Goldfish had a minor radio and MTV hit called “Veronica Sawyer”.
