= Shattered Image =

- Directed by: Raúl Ruiz
- Written by: Duane Poole
- Produced by: Barbet Schroeder; Lloyd A. Silverman; Susan Hoffman
- Starring: Anne Parillaud; William Baldwin; Lisanne Falk; Graham Greene; Bulle Ogier
- Cinematography: Robby Müller
- Music by: Jorge Arriagada
- Production company: Seven Arts Productions
- Distributed by: Lions Gate Films
- Release date: December 4, 1998 (Limited)
- Running time: 103 minutes
- Country: United States
- Language: English
- Budget: $7.5 million
- Box office: $102,523

Shattered Image is a 1998 surreal thriller film written by Duane Poole and directed by Chilean filmmaker Raúl Ruiz. It stars William Baldwin, Anne Parillaud and Lisanne Falk.

== Plot ==
Confusing realities surface in this paranoid film dealing with the fragile nature of a young woman, Jessie (Anne Parillaud) recovering from rape and an apparent attempted suicide. In one reality, she is a killer destroyer of men. In another she is the new wife on a Jamaican honeymoon with her new husband Brian (William Baldwin), who is trying to help her recover. As Jessie switches between realities through her dreams she seeks to figure out who the other Jessie is and why she is seeing her. As the dramatically different realities start to merge causing grave implications questions start to arise. Is someone trying to kill Jessie, can Jessie trust her new husband Brian, and most importantly who is the real Jessie?

== Cast ==
- William Baldwin as Brian
- Anne Parillaud as Jessie Markham
- Lisanne Falk as Paula/Laura
- Graham Greene as Detective
- Bulle Ogier as Mrs. Ford
- Billy Wilmott as Lamond
- O'Neil Peart as Simon
- Leonie Forbes as Isabel

== Reception ==
The film received mixed reviews. New York Times critic Stephen Holden wrote that the film, "leaves an ambiguous impression" as he explains, "The movie, which aggressively parodies the Alfred Hitchcock of Vertigo and Marnie, may be a tongue-in-cheek spoof. Or it could be an homage. Mr. Ruiz probably wanted it both ways." Kevin Thomas of the Los Angeles Times was positive about the film, complimenting Ruiz for his filmmaking skills and the actors Parillaud and Baldwin for their ability to shift between roles. Thomas writes, "Ruiz piles on such questions to such dizzying heights that his picture begins to boggle the mind, like looking too long at a labyrinthine M.C. Esher drawing. It's best to let the film simply wash over you because trying to sort everything out invites a certain tedium. However, it's worth going along with Ruiz because his payoff is so stunning that you realize that as usual he's carefully building toward it every step of the way. Ruiz verges on pure cinema, relying on the camera rather than dialogue to reveal character, tell the story and express his preoccupation with the duality of human nature." Despite some positive reception many critics panned the film. Edward Guthmann of the San Francisco Chronicle writes, "Movie patrons who sit through Shattered Image, a dreadful thriller that opens today, deserve a reward. A bottle of cognac. A poinsettia. Maybe a bay cruise. And a written apology." Guthmann continues, "The concept is vaguely intriguing, but the execution is bad enough to put you off movies for good... Ruiz's direction is clumsy, his pacing is slack and Parillaud delivers her lines in a semi-intelligible, monotone whisper."

Academic Michael Goddard writes about the Hollywood kitsch and B-movie style of Shattered Image in his comprehensive analysis of Ruiz films in The Cinema of Raúl Ruiz: Impossible Cartographies. Goddard mentions that Jessie is a reprisal of the character Nikita from Luc Besson's La Femme Nikita (1990). He further mentions that the script of this film was unconventional for Ruiz as he used a B grade script by Duane Poole, who spent most of his career writing for television series like The Love Boat and The Smurfs. Goddard summarizes, " While not a straight to video release, Shattered Image was not far from it and certainly resembles the kind of mass-produced kitsch Hollywood B thrillers that were in vogue at that time in the 1990s, complete with a sub-Hitchcock mystery narrative, exotic locations and intimations of both sex and violence... Certainly it is the only Ruiz film one is likely to see screened on late night satellite TV, and not on an 'Indie' channel but one specialising in actions films." Goddard wrestles with Ruiz's choice to make a film that so strongly goes against Ruiz's filmic ideologies including the notorious central conflict theory. Goddard decides," the script of Shattered Image fell into the category of being so bad it ended up being unintentionally good. In other words while there is an attempt to construct a generic and cliche narrative based on suspense, mystery, betrayal and sex, all taking place against the backdrop of the exotic location of Jamaica, the script really fails to tie all of its elements together, attaining in the process an involuntary Surrealism." According to Goddard, Shattered Image is a confusing and surreal film about complicated identities which "parallel David Lynch's Moebius strip style films also dealing with parallel identities and realities that he was making at [the same] time, Lost Highway (1997) and Mulholland Dr. (2001)."

In an interview with film critic Jonathan Rosenbaum, Ruiz calls Shattered Image an "American accident." He explains some of his opinions and experiences of the top to down "disconnected" filmmaking process in America. Ruiz says, "Shattered Image, I fought to make, and I now have a film about what it means to make a film in America – why American movies are the way they are. It's a very strange film because I thought about it in the terms of American movies. In the American cinema there are good guys and bad guys. The good guys are the artists, let's say the filmmakers, and the bad guys are the actors, sometimes the producers. I found new bad guys, who were the technicians, the workers, who were so obviously disconnected with the project, with the story of the movie. In France, you can get a good price from an electrician if he likes a script, if he finds it interesting and not very commercial he can, let's say, work Saturdays for free. And I thought that the relationship with the producer was ambiguous because he had the money coming from everywhere and he had to deal with those other producers, and everyone had a very precise idea about the movie. And the discussion was at the level of where to put the camera. That was new for me. The idea that I decided where to put the camera was new to them. The editor was the director, and not the cameraman."

== Sources ==
- Goddard, Michael (2013). The Cinema of Raúl Ruiz: Impossible Cartographies. New York: Columbia University Press. p. 119. ISBN 978-0-231-16730-7.
