= Lisanne Falk =

American actress

- Born: December 3, 1964 (age 61); Long Beach, New York, U.S.
- Occupation: Actress
- Years active: 1982–2002; 2024–present

Lisanne Falk (born December 3, 1964) is an American actress. She is best known for her role as Heather McNamara in the dark comedy film Heathers (1988).

== Career ==
Falk is a former child model who worked at Ford Models with Brooke Shields. In 1978, at age 13, she appeared with Shields in Life magazine, in a pictorial which received a great deal of media attention and helped propel the careers of Falk and Shields. Falk is featured on the cover of Foreigner's 1979 album Head Games. Her modeling work was featured in the book Lisanne: A Young Model. She is best known for playing Heather McNamara in the dark comedy film Heathers (1988). She retired from acting in 2002, but returned in 2024.

== Personal life ==
Falk moved to London in 2006 and acquired British citizenship in 2019.

== Filmography ==
=== Film ===
Year	Title	Role	Notes
1984	Violated	Judy Engels	
1987	I Love N.Y.	Linda	
1987	In the Mood	Jamie	
1987	Less than Zero	Patti	
1988	Heathers	Heather McNamara	
1989	Say Anything...	Sandra	
1991	Night on Earth	Rock Manager	Segment: "Los Angeles"
1991	Leather Jackets	Shanna	
1997	The First to Go	Anne	
1997	Suicide Kings	Marty's Wife	
1998	Shattered Image	Paula / Laura	
2002	Casablanca	Wendy	Short
2024	Seed of Doubt	Shifra	Short

=== Television ===
Year	Title	Role	Notes
1982	Born Beautiful	Model	TV movie
1986	Prince of Bel Air	Stacy	TV movie
1988	Werewolf	Michelle	Episode: "A Material Girl"
1989	The Preppie Murder	Alex LaGatta	TV movie
1990	ABC Afterschool Special	Karen	Episode: "Over the Limit"
1991	Aftermath: A Test of Love	Gretchen	TV movie
1991	Dead Silence	Joan Reducci	TV movie
1991	Runaway Father	Marjean Stewart	TV movie
2024	FBI: International	Darlene Simonds	Episode: "A Leader, Not a Tourist"
