= Stoopid =

Stoopid is a common misspelling or ironic spelling of stupid. It may also refer to:

- "Stoopid!", a 2011 song by CeCe Peniston
- "Stoopid" (6ix9ine song), a 2018 song by 6ix9ine featuring Bobby Shmurda
- Stoopid Records, a record label by American band Slightly Stoopid
- Stoopid Buddy Stoodios, a production company who produced Robot Chicken
- "Stoopid", a song from the album Get Some by Snot

== See also ==
- Stupid (disambiguation)
