= Alex Day =

English musician, vlogger and writer (born 1989)

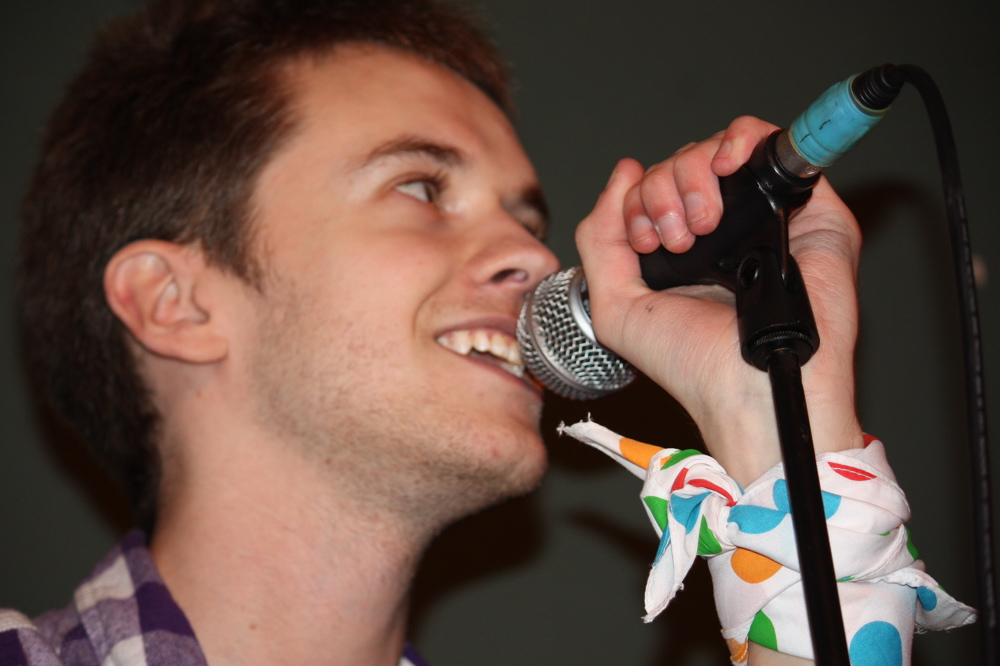
- Alex Day in 2010

Background information
- Also known as: Nerimon
- Born: Alex Richard George Day; 8 April 1989 (age 37)
- Origin: Hornchurch, London, England
- Genres: Synthpop, folk, acoustic, electronic
- Occupations: Musician, singer-songwriter, YouTuber, writer
- Instruments: Vocals, guitar, ukulele, bass, keyboard, drums, appalachian dulcimer
- Years active: 2006–present
- Formerly of: Chameleon Circuit, Sons of Admirals

Alex Richard George Day (born 8 April 1989) is an English musician, vlogger and writer. Day has released seven studio albums, two EPs, and had three UK Top 40 hits. Day amassed more than 1,000,000 subscribers and over 130 million views on his YouTube channel; the majority of his videos are now private.

== Music career ==
=== Musical debut: 2008–2010 ===
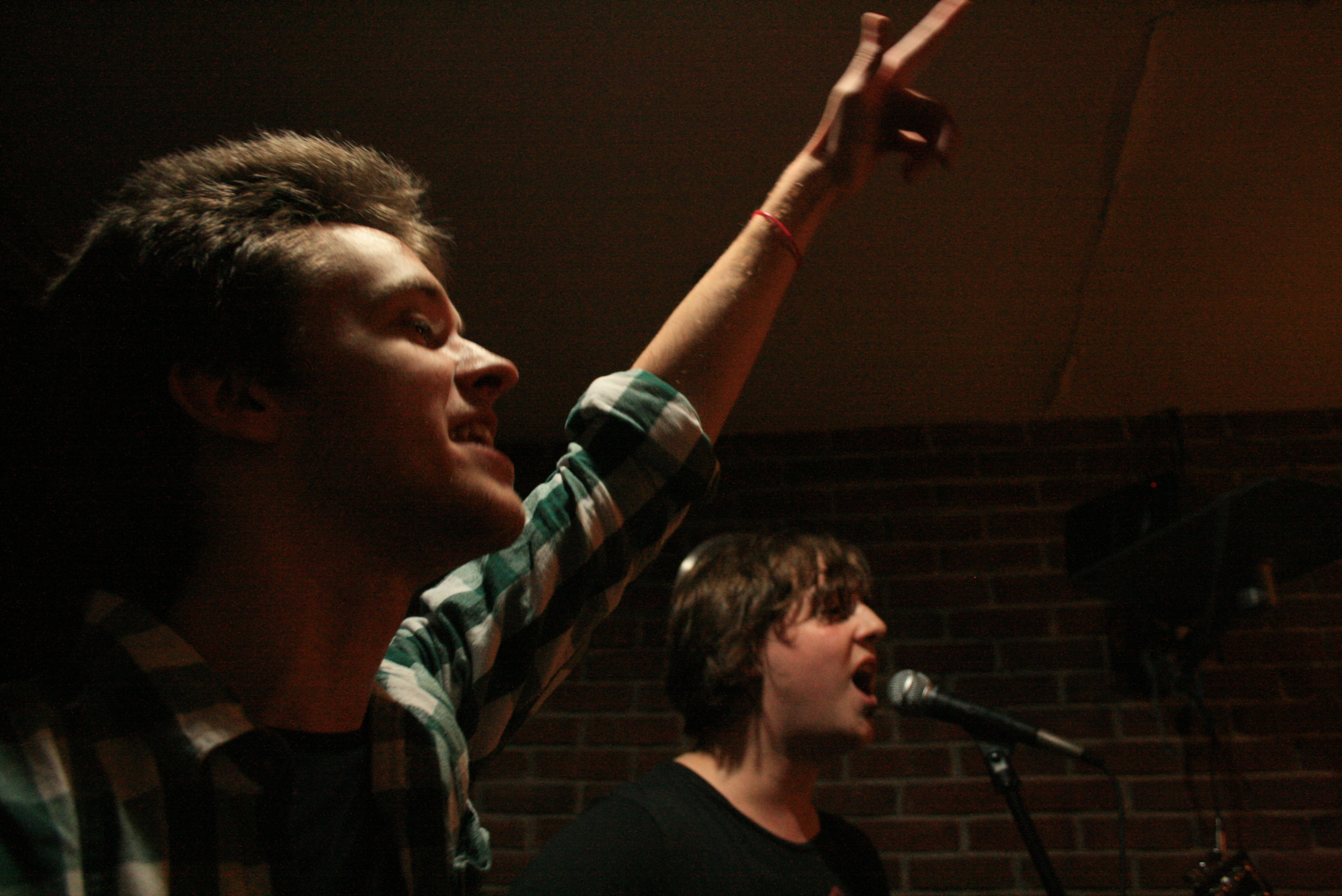
Alex Day performing with Ed Blann, Gizzi's Coffee in New York City 2010

Day first became interested in music in 2005 when he bought an electric guitar at the age of 15. He started his YouTube account one year later on 4 August 2006. In 2008, Day founded Chameleon Circuit, a Trock (short for "timelord rock") band that wrote music inspired by the British TV show Doctor Who. In June 2009, the band released its first self-titled album by YouTube musicians' record label DFTBA Records and a second album Still Got Legs in July 2011. Wired noted that Chameleon Circuit "puts out titles that could pass for chart-toppers – if they weren't excessively nerdy in the subject matter department."

Day released his debut album Parrot Stories in April 2009 through DFTBA Records, which was produced by fellow musician and friend Tom Milsom. This was then followed by an EP, 117% Complete, in March 2010 which contained songs referencing various video games such as Pokémon. His second album, The World Is Mine (I Don't Know Anything), was released in June 2010 contained a more electronic-dance sound than his previous folk album. To ensure he did not alienate his fans of his debut album, Day released an EP of acoustic songs, Soup Sessions: Acoustic, in November 2010 which contained newly recorded acoustic versions of half the songs on the album.

Day was a featured artist on the BBC Two reality show Chartjackers in 2009. The programme challenged four YouTube video producers to write, record and release a pop song in 10 weeks, using YouTube as a tool to get lyrics and singers, with the proceeds going to the BBC Children in Need charity.

The completed single, entitled "I've Got Nothing", was sung by vocalists Miranda Chartrand and Adam Nichols, and was released worldwide through the iTunes Store on 9 November 2009. It was reviewed with varying degrees of approval by various media outlets, including The Times, Yahoo! Music's James Masterton, BBC Radio 1's Chart Blog and Popjustice. The song peaked at No. 36 on the UK Singles Chart and raised almost £10,000 for Children in Need.

Day also appeared with the Chartjackers at the Hammersmith Apollo for the BBC Switch Live 2009 show, along with artists such as Black Eyed Peas, N-Dubz, and Pixie Lott. Day was also a member of Youstage, an ad hoc group of YouTube vloggers who competed successfully on the BBC Three talent show Upstaged during March 2008.

=== Epigrams & Interludes: 2011–2013 ===
For Christmas 2011, Day released his single "Forever Yours", which reached No. 4 in the UK Singles chart after selling over 50,000 copies in one week. Day released the single without support from a record label or TV coverage, and outsold songs from multi-platinum artists such as Coldplay, Rihanna, and Katy Perry. The Official Charts Company lauded Day's success, stating "'Forever Yours' is certainly one of the most successful self-released tracks we have ever seen, the Official Charts are based on sales, and sales alone, so Alex's achievements this week are a genuine reflection of the passion of his army of fans, and of course, the power of social media." Day also released 11 alternate versions of "Forever Yours", confirming that all sales revenue made from the alternate versions would be going to charity, chiefly to World Vision.

On 1 April 2012, Day released his second single, "Lady Godiva", a cover of the 1966 Peter and Gordon song. The single was Day's first to get a physical release in UK record stores following a one-single distribution arrangement with HMV and other stores. Within its first week of release, the song charted at No. 15, making it Day's second UK Top 20 hit. The song also charted in 15 other countries including Australia, New Zealand, Canada, the United States, Sweden, Norway, and Spain as well as reaching No. 1 in Slovenia. In May 2012, Day released three singles—"Good Morning Sunshine", "She Walks Right Through Me", and "This Kiss"—on a single day, selling nearly 150,000 copies. This "disruptive" model largely ignored the conventional method of releasing one single every few months, and its success was profiled in MTV and Billboard.

Day has received millions of plays for his music by releasing music videos on YouTube, with his most popular being the 2011 single "Forever Yours", whose music video reached 1.5 million views in its first week of release. The video has since been removed from the website by Charlotte McDonnell. Day's "disruptive distribution" strategy was once described as "the future of music" by Ryan Holiday. Day has been profiled on BBC and CNN and in world publications like Forbes, The Guardian and Holy Moly.

On 16 December 2012, he attempted to break the world record for most songs sold in 1 hour with his song "Stupid Stupid". The song later peaked on UK charts at No. 25. In order to promote the single, Day held a one-day tour entitled Stupidfest, which was free for entry.

Day released his third album, Epigrams and Interludes, on 17 March 2013. It contains all his previously released singles since "Forever Yours". He also released a music video for 'I've Got What It Takes' starring Tom Ridgewell, Carrie Hope Fletcher and Khyan Mansley. The album debuted at No. 2 on the UK iTunes charts.

Day partnered with the file sharing service BitTorrent for an exclusive bundle with the release of Epigrams and Interludes. The package was downloaded over 1 million times in the first week of release.

=== Hiatus, return and further releases: 2014–present ===
In March 2014, Day removed his artist pages, merchandise and information from his record label, DFTBA Records. His official website, alexdaymusic.com, was also taken down.

On 5 October 2014, Day uploaded a video on his YouTube channel, his first video since February 2014. It was titled "The Past". In the video, Day talks about his side of the allegations accused of him, as well as his thoughts and opinion on the matter. Day also mentioned that he planned on creating and uploading more videos talking about the situation.

On 10 January 2015, Day uploaded his new single, "Scared Like Me", to YouTube and thus announced his musical return. It was his first new song in two years. Day also announced that he would be releasing a new album on 4 October 2015 and throughout the year he would release three more singles from this album. It was later announced that this album would be called 'Nowhere Left To Hide'.

On 3 April 2015, Day uploaded a new track to his channel, which was a cover of Chumbawamba's "Ugh! Your Ugly Houses!". It was intended as a protest single, to be released on the week of the 2015 UK General Election, focusing on the lack of representativeness of the UK government and electoral system. Day aimed for the single to chart at number 1 in the UK on the track's week of release; however, it failed to chart. It was later released as part of his 2021 album Relax! Nothing Is Under Control!.

On 17 May 2015, Day released a new single available to download on his website, entitled 'Keep Me Up'. His fourth and final single, titled 'Beyond You' was released on 26 July 2015. On 3 October, Day announced he would release the album a day early for all of those who signed on for the newsletter. He also announced that rather than a physical CD edition, Nowhere Left To Hide would be released as a physical USB with the album on. On the album, Day stated 'This was a hard album to make. In a lot of ways, it was an album I needed to make. It's quite raw and makes me feel a bit exposed. But I love it and I'm very proud to have it and to share it. I think parts of it are my best work and overall it's probably the most cohesive release I’ve ever put out'.

In December 2015, Day announced he had recorded five new songs for an untitled studio release in the future. On 28 January 2016 he confirmed the album would be called Split Infinities and would be the first of his solo albums to feature a backing band. He released it on 30 September 2016. Day released his sixth album Sunset on streaming platforms in October 2019, his seventh album Relax! Nothing Is Under Control! in August 2021 and his eighth album The Stranger in March 2026. His most recent album, The Drop, released in October 2026.

== Other work ==
=== YouTube ===
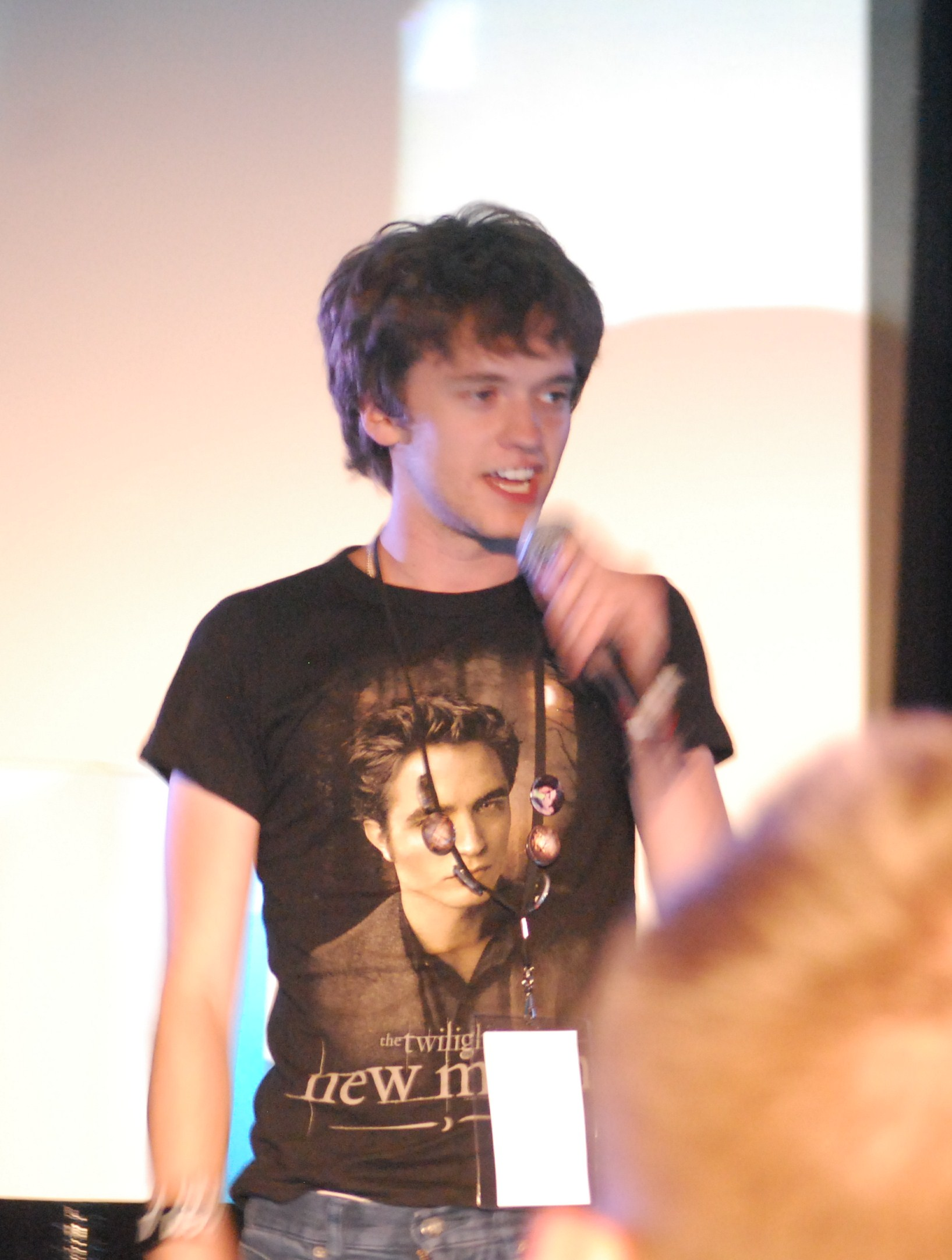
Alex Day at VidCon 2010

At one point, Day was named as "one of Britain's most popular YouTubers." He created his first YouTube channel, Nerimon, as a teenager making videos in his bedroom, stating, "I was making a video podcast to entertain family and friends – just a little comedy series." He received international attention for his video entitled "Alex and Liam Do Walmart" in which he visited the American Superstar Walmart megastore alongside fellow YouTubers and Chameleon Circuit band members, Liam Dryden and Michael Aranda. CBS called the titular vloggers "delightfully confused", while the Huffington Post described the video as possibly providing detail into American Pop Culture, placing a poll at the end of their article.

Day further found success through a popular series of videos entitled Alex Reads Twilight, in which he read and critically analyzed the popular young-adult novel Twilight, by Stephenie Meyer. The videos have received a total of over 14 million views. Amongst these, Day's YouTube channel also contains travel vlogs, music videos and satirical rants. In June 2014, he had reached over a million subscribers and his videos had been watched over 100 million times.

Day unlisted a video about cosplaying entitled "Big Girls in Costumes" after criticism that he was belittling obese women who took part in the activity. He stated that it was "satirical" and that, "I'm not going to take the video down because I don't want to pretend this didn't happen – running away from mistakes isn't how you solve them – but I have made the video unlisted so you can only see it if you have the link. I think that's a good compromise between not risking more people being hurt by the content but also not trying to hide the mistake. I’ve also taken the ads off it."

On his celebrity, Day has stated he became disillusioned with it. He said "I like the focus not being on me. I’ve never really liked the recognition very much. I just wanna make the best work I can make".

After losing an average of over 10,000 subscribers per month after sexual misconduct allegations were made against him, as of April 2021, Day has less than 900,000 subscribers.

In early 2015, Day stated that he was discontinuing his main channel after releasing what was then his final video on that platform, in order to set up a new channel named The Daily Day. In December 2015, Day announced his return to Nerimon. In order to develop a more private life, he eventually hid most of his channel's content from public view and set up a Patreon where he continued to produce unlisted videos, music and other content through donations. This was ultimately closed without reason on 18 July 2025.

==== The Daily Day ====
On 10 May 2015, Day uploaded his final video to his Main channel, titled "Goodbye Nerimon (last video!)". Within it, he explained that he was launching a new YouTube channel called The Daily Day, which would feature a new vlog everyday, with a focus on the topic of mindfulness. Day stated that the creation of a new channel was to "define a fresh start and have a channel focused on my new direction, with an active audience I know is there just for that", and to clear out dead subscribers from the old channel after the loss of viewership.

As of 18 May 2015, the Daily Day channel has accumulated 13,000 subscribers and 44,000 video views.

Eventually, The Daily Day became a shared channel in which other creators could share and distribute their own videos on mindfulness. Therefore, the channel featured various other hosts, with videos created by people other than Day.

The Daily Day channel became inactive during late 2015, and has since been stripped of all public content.

=== Writing ===
In late 2013, Day announced that he had completed work on his first book, with the working title The Underground Storyteller, the book was about his experiences with the London Underground. It was 12 chapters in length and was scheduled to be published in July 2014. It was cancelled by the publishers. On 13 October 2014, Day announced online that he was releasing his book independently, keeping the name of The Underground Storyteller, and that he will sign and number the first thousand copies.

Day's second book was the memoir Living and Dying on the Internet, which detailed his personal experiences as a YouTuber and the controversies surrounding his sexual misconduct allegations. During its conception and writing, Carrie Hope Fletcher threatened legal action in regards to her inclusion in the book. Though nothing came of this, Fletcher and many other YouTubers and ex-colleagues of Day spoke out against the release of the book and encouraged their followers not to purchase it. The book was released on 5 August 2018.

Day was also featured in the book Choose Yourself by James Altucher, where Altucher encourages others to bypass the "middle man" and build their own audience online.

== Personal life ==
He worked in the Regent Street Apple Store during 2009. In August 2010, Day visited Zambia whilst taking part in the World Vision Vlogger charity event. He filmed and shared his experiences on YouTube. Until 2013, Day lived with friend, collaborator and bandmate Charlotte McDonnell.

Day announced on 14 February 2014 that he had been dating fellow YouTuber Carrie Hope Fletcher since October 2013. However, Fletcher announced their break-up via Twitter on 14 March 2014.

Day has identified as an atheist, but expressed interest in Buddhist teachings after visiting the Plum Village Monastery in mid-2014. Day also identifies as a minimalist and vegan.

In March 2014, Day admitted to having engaged in "manipulative relationships" with several women and having "created situations that put people under enormous pressure". He made further admission, saying, "the model of consent that I followed... was that only, 'no' meant, 'no'. That is not what consent is", although he later claimed this statement was authored by John and Hank Green. He also announced via his blog that he had taken down his merchandise and artist pages from his label's website

A former friend and coworker, Charlotte McDonnell stated, "I just don't feel able to call Alex a friend of mine any more." Day alleges that he subsequently attempted to reach out to McDonnell and that they could not agree upon a method of communication.

On 5 October 2014, after a seven-month hiatus, Day released a statement regarding the allegations, claiming that he "didn't realise at the time that [the women] felt pressured", and apologising. In the half-hour video he also referenced what he saw as "militant" reactions posted on the social networking site, Tumblr, labelling them as "an angry torrent of abuse" and "people just being absolutely horrible to anyone who doesn't agree with them". His response was criticised on Twitter by YouTubers Hannah Witton and Jack Howard.

== Work ==
=== Discography ===
Albums

- Parrot Stories (2009)
- The World Is Mine (I Don't Know Anything) (2010)
- Epigrams and Interludes (2013)
- Nowhere Left to Hide (2015)
- Split Infinities (2016)
- Sunset (2019)
- Relax! Nothing Is Under Control! (2021)
- The Stranger (2026)
- The Drop (2026)

Extended Plays

- 117% Complete (2010)
- Soup Sessions: Acoustic (2010)
- Shoebox EP (2016)

=== Books ===
- Day, Alex (15 August 2014). The Underground Storyteller. Ebury Publishing. p. 320. ISBN 978-0091959784.
- Day, Alex (5 August 2018). Living and Dying on the Internet. Alex Day. p. 330. ISBN 9780993020421.
