= Stupid Stupid =

Single by Alex Day
- Released: 16 December 2012
- Recorded: 2012
- Genre: Pop
- Length: 2:46
- Songwriter(s): Alex Day
- Producer(s): Alex Day

Alex Day singles chronology
"Lady Godiva" (2012)	"Stupid Stupid" (2012)

"Stupid Stupid" is a single recorded by English musician Alex Day. It was released on 16 December 2012 in an effort to take the Christmas Number 1 spot in the UK Singles Chart. The song entered the UK Singles Chart at number 25, number 4 on the UK Indie Chart and number 27 in Scotland.

== Campaign for Christmas Number 1 ==
"Stupid Stupid" is Day's third attempt to get into the charts by utilising the internet. In 2009, Day was part of the Chartjackers project, which charted at number 36 in the UK. In 2010, Day was part of the collective "Sons of Admirals" along with three other YouTubers. The group's cover of Cat Stevens' song "Here Comes My Baby" peaked at No. 61 in the UK Singles Chart. In 2011 he released Forever Yours which was his best attempt so far, peaking at No. 4 in the UK Singles Chart.

== Music video ==
A music video to accompany the release of "Stupid Stupid" was first released onto YouTube on 5 December 2012 at a total length of two minutes and fifty-six seconds. The music video was directed by Ciaran O'Brien and stars Day's family.

== Track listing ==
Digital download
No.	Title	Length
1.	"Stupid Stupid"	2:46

== Chart performance ==
Chart (2012)	Peak position
Ireland (IRMA)	60
Scotland (OCC)	27
UK Indie (OCC)	4
UK Singles (OCC)	25

== Release history ==
Region	Date	Format
Worldwide	16 December 2012	Digital Download
United Kingdom	16 December 2012	Digital Download CD Single
