= Still Got Legs =

Studio album by Chameleon Circuit
- Released: 12 July 2011
- Recorded: 2010–2011
- Genre: Rock
- Label: DFTBA Records
- Producer: Michael Aranda

Chameleon Circuit chronology
Chameleon Circuit (2009)	Still Got Legs (2011)

Still Got Legs is the second and final studio album by British rock band Chameleon Circuit. The album was released through DFTBA Records on 12 July 2011. It charted at No. 23 on the Billboard Heatseekers album chart. The title is derived from the Eleventh Doctor's first words.

== Promotion and release ==
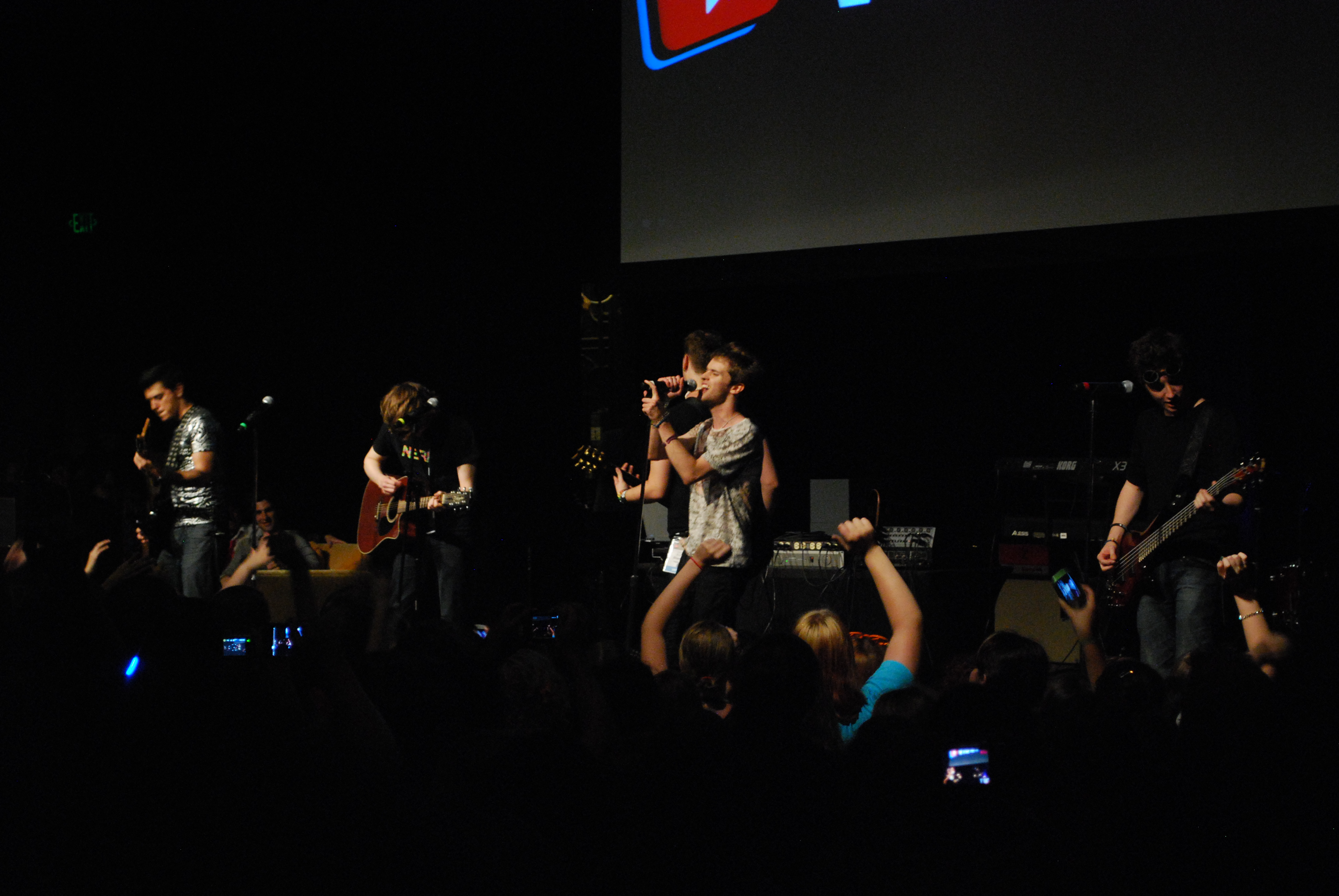
The band during their performance at VidCon 2011.

The album charted on the Billboard Heatseekers chart at no.23.

== Track listing ==
All tracks are written by Alex Day, Charlotte McDonnell (formerly Charlie McDonnell), Liam Dryden, Ed Blann and Michael Aranda, except where noted

No.	Title	Writer(s)	Length
1.	"The Subwave Signal"	Aranda	0:26
2.	"Regenerate Me"	Aranda, Blann	2:48
3.	"Nightmares"	Aranda, Blann, Dryden	3:14
4.	"Travelling Man"	Aranda, Day	4:04
5.	"Everything Is Ending"	Aranda, Day	3:01
6.	"Mr Pond"	Blann, McDonnell	4:12
7.	"Kiss the Girl"	Aranda, Blann	2:57
8.	"Knock Four Times"	Aranda, Day	0:41
9.	"Teenage Rebel"	Blann, Day	2:39
10.	"Big Bang Two"	Aranda, McDonnell	3:01
11.	"Eleven"	Aranda, Murray Gold	1:18
12.	"The Sound of Drums"	Aranda, Blann	5:58
13.	"Silence and the End of All Things"	Day	3:09
14.	"The Doctor is Dying"	Day	3:37
15.	"Still Not Ginger"	Blann	1:58

== Personnel ==
- Alex Day - vocals, guitar, bass
- Ed Blann - vocals, guitar
- Charlotte McDonnell - vocals, guitar, ukulele
- Liam Dryden - vocals, keyboard, bass
- Michael Aranda - production, vocals, guitar, percussion, bass, keyboard, mixing

Guest musicians

- Bryarly Bishop - vocals on "Travelling Man", "Everything Is Ending", and "Silence and the End of All Things"
- Ali Zogheib - harmonica and guitar on "Travelling Man"

== Chart performance ==
Year	Chart	Peak position
2011	US Heat	23
