= Peter and Gordon (1964 album) =

- Mono and stereo album cover available on streaming.

Studio album by Peter and Gordon
- Released: 5 June 1964; 1964 (North America)
- Genre: Pop
- Length: 30:28 (Peter and Gordon); 26:50 (A World Without Love)
- Label: Columbia; Capitol Records
- Producer: Norman Newell; Dave Dexter Jr. (North America)

Peter and Gordon chronology
Peter and Gordon (1964)	In Touch with Peter and Gordon (1964)

Singles from Peter and Gordon
- 1. "A World Without Love" Released: 28 February 1964

Alternative cover
- North American cover

Peter and Gordon (titled A World Without Love in North America) is the debut album by English music duo Peter and Gordon, released on 5 June 1964. (Note: Date unknown in North America, but is likely the same date or similar.)

== Background ==
"A World Without Love" was composed sometime around 1963, when its songwriter Paul McCartney moved in with his then-girlfriend Jane Asher, who was sharing a room with her brother Peter.

== Release ==
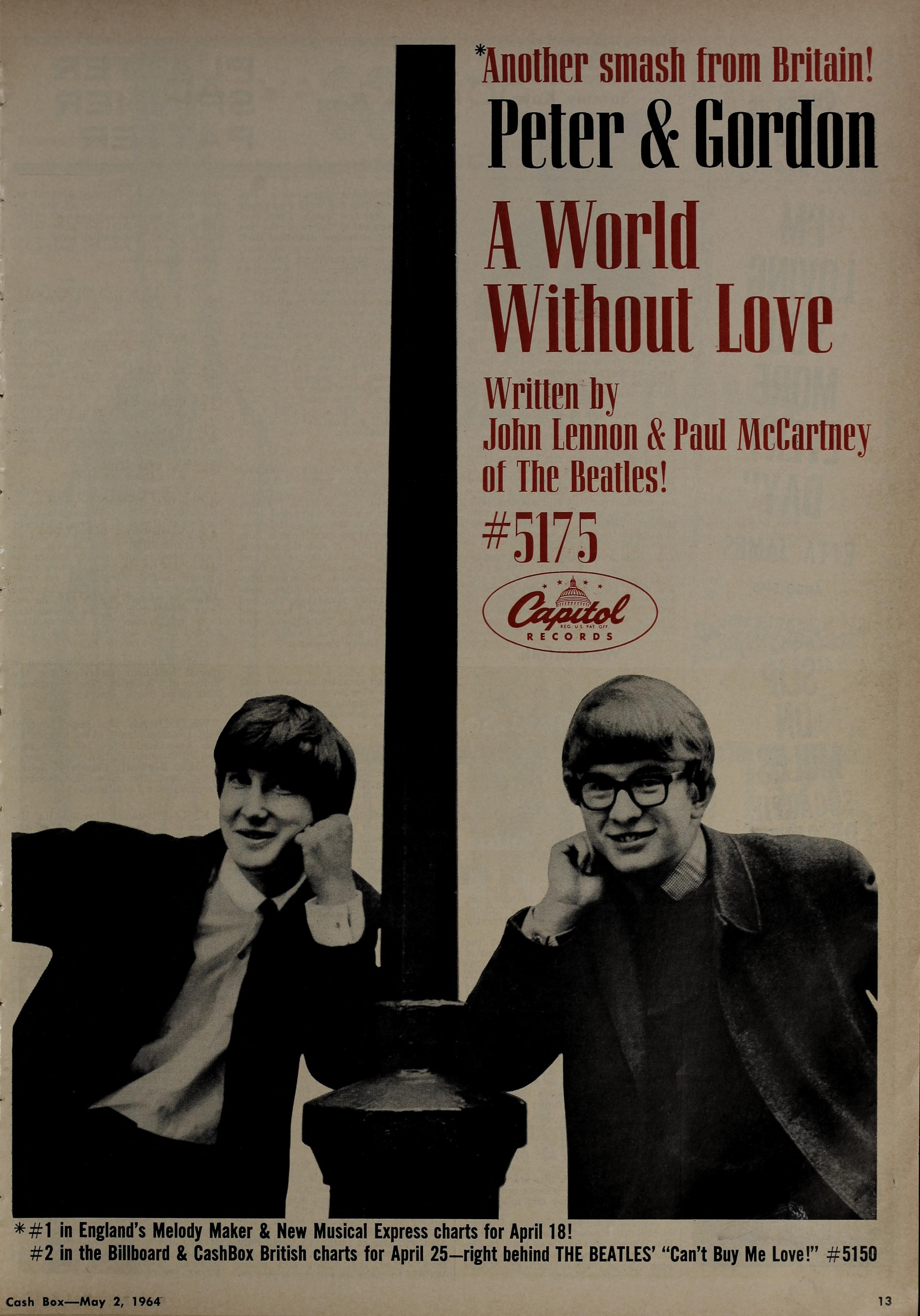
Cashbox advertisement for the "A World Without Love" single, 2 May 1964

Peter and Gordon was released on 5 June 1964 in the United Kingdom by Columbia Records. The record's only single, "A World Without Love" was released on 28 February 1964 and became a worldwide hit. The album was reissued in 1999 on compact disc in stereo alongside the already existing mono mix.

== Reception ==
Professional ratings
Review scores
Source	Rating
AllMusic (Peter and Gordon)	2.5/5 stars
AllMusic (A World Without Love)	4/5 stars
The Encyclopedia of Popular Music (Both versions)	3/5 stars

Reviewing the U.K. release, critic Bruce Eder states it is "not bad", noting that "nothing here is distinguishable from work by the Merseybeats, the Roulettes, or a dozen other groups of the period or, indeed, is as distinctive as the best work of either of those bands", stating that the songs the duo are best on are the folk tracks. Reviewing the North American release, a writer of Cash Box wrote the duo "display an easy-listening teen-folk delivery with broad appeal, and have a real feeling for the American folk idiom".

== Track listing ==
Side one
No.	Title	Writer(s)	Length
1.	"Lucille"	Albert Collins; Richard Penniman	2:11
2.	"Five Hundred Miles"	Hedy West	3:18
3.	"If I Were You"	Peter Asher; Gordon Waller	2:32
4.	"Pretty Mary"	Elaina Mezzetti; Milton Okun; Noel Paul Stookey	2:19
5.	"Trouble in Mind"	Richard M. Jones	2:22
6.	"A World Without Love"	Lennon–McCartney	2:44

Side two
No.	Title	Writer(s)	Length
1.	"Tell Me How"	Charles Hardin; Jerry Allison; Norman Petty	2:21
2.	"You Don't Have to Tell Me"	Asher–Waller	2:39
3.	"Leave My Woman Alone"	Ray Charles	1:56
4.	"All My Trials"	Traditional, arranged by Asher–Waller	2:35
5.	"Last Night I Woke"	Asher–Waller	2:48
6.	"Long Time Gone"	Traditional, arranged by Asher–Waller	3:27

Notes

- "Long Time Gone" is absent from the North American versions.

== Personnel ==
- Peter Asher – vocals
- Gordon Waller – vocals
- Geoff Love – arranger

== Charts ==
Chart performances for Peter and Gordon and A World Without Love
Chart (1964)	Peak position
UK Albums (OCC)	18
US Billboard Top LPs	21
