= In Touch with Peter and Gordon =

Studio album by Peter and Gordon
- Released: 4 December 1964
- Genre: Pop
- Length: 45:50
- Label: Columbia
- Producer: Norman Newell

Peter and Gordon chronology
Peter and Gordon (1964)	In Touch with Peter and Gordon (1964)	I Don't Want to See You Again (1964)

In Touch with Peter and Gordon is the second studio album by English music duo Peter and Gordon that was released exclusively in the United Kingdom on 4 December 1964 by Columbia Records.

== Releases ==
In 1997, the album was reissued on CD with new stereo mixes of the tracks, with mastering by Peter Mew at Abbey Road Studios. The 14 new mixes are available on digital editions of the album.

== Critical reception ==
Professional ratings
Review scores
Source	Rating
AllMusic	2/5 stars
The Encyclopedia of Popular Music	3/5 stars

Writing for AllMusic, critic Richie Unterberger wrote it "furthers their vague credentials as folk-rock precursors", noting the music is "pleasant but slight, and just too damned polite to be of much consequence". He notes there is no U.S. counterpart, but points out half of the album's songs appear on I Don't Want to See You Again, a U.S. exclusive album.

== Track listing ==
According to the liner notes:

Side one
No.	Title	Writer(s)	Length
1.	"Freight Train"	Paul James; Fred Williams	2:07
2.	"Land of Oden"	traditional, arranged by Peter and Gordon	3:00
3.	"A Mess of Blues"	Doc Pomus; Mort Shuman	2:39
4.	"Two Little Love Birds"	Travis Wammack	2:13
5.	"Barbara Allen"	traditional, arranged by Peter and Gordon	2:48
6.	"I Still Love You"	Eddie King	2:34
7.	"I Don't Want to See You Again"	Lennon–McCartney	1:59

Side two
No.	Title	Writer(s)	Length
1.	"My Babe"	George Stone; Willie Dixon	2:27
2.	"Willow Garden"	traditional, arranged by Peter and Gordon	3:07
3.	"Love Me, Baby"	Walter–Asher	2:16
4.	"I Don't Care What They Say"	Walter–Asher	2:59
5.	"My Little Girl's Gone"	Wammack	2:33
6.	"Ain't That Lovin' You Baby"	Jimmy Reed	1:51
7.	"Leave Me in the Rain"	Walter–Asher	2:56
