= Lady Godiva (song) =

1966 single by Peter and Gordon

Single by Peter and Gordon
- B-side: "Morning's Calling"
- Released: 9 September 1966
- Recorded: 1966
- Studio: Abbey Road Studios, London
- Genre: Pop, music hall, novelty
- Length: 2:24
- Label: Columbia
- Songwriters: Mike Leander, Charlie Mills
- Producer: John Burgess

Peter and Gordon singles chronology
"To Show I Love You" (1966)	"Lady Godiva" (1966)	"Knight In Rusty Armour" (1966)

"Lady Godiva" is a popular song originally recorded and released in early 1966 as a single by Paul Jones. British pop duo Peter and Gordon subsequently recorded it. Though it only made it to No. 16 in the UK, it became one of the duo's greatest successes in the United States, rising to No. 6 in December 1966.

== Content ==
The song is a music hall-style number which frivolously references the legend of Lady Godiva, re-imagining it in the modern day: a film director from Hollywood witnesses her legendary ride (with "her long blonde hair" obscuring her breasts and other private parts) and recruits the lady to star in his movie. It is revealed in the third verse that he directs pornographic films, thus attracting a seemingly large crowd who are "craning their necks" to see the lady.

== Peter and Gordon version ==
The track was a drastic stylistic shift for Peter and Gordon, who had specialized in melancholy love songs. The music hall style of "Lady Godiva" matched several Herman's Hermits' hits, as well as "Winchester Cathedral" by the New Vaudeville Band, which was rising up the UK charts when Peter and Gordon recorded "Lady Godiva". Eventually "Winchester Cathedral" and "Lady Godiva" would share the US Top Ten, with the former succeeding the latter at #1 in Canada.

Peter and Gordon's producer, John Burgess, brought "Lady Godiva" to the duo after he produced the Paul Jones album My Way, which included the track. Peter Asher, who with Gordon Waller comprised Peter and Gordon, recalls that he [Asher] objected to recording the song but Waller retorted: "It'll be funny [so] shut up". The single was recorded at Abbey Road Studios and reunited Peter and Gordon with Geoff Love who, after arranging and conducting the duo's first six singles, had sat out their last three A-sides. "Lady Godiva" would be Love's final Peter and Gordon A-side collaboration.

Released in September 1966, "Lady Godiva" afforded Peter and Gordon a comeback in both the UK and, especially, the US. In the UK, the single peaked at #16, returning Peter and Gordon to the Top 20 after their previous two singles "Woman" and "To Show I Love You" had fallen short, the latter not having reached the Top 50. In the US, "Lady Godiva" rose as high as #6 in December 1966, the duo's first Top Ten showing since "I Go to Pieces" in February 1965. The single sold over a million copies and was awarded a gold disc. Billboard described the song as a "hilarious novelty number with easy dance beat."

It has been said that the mayor of Coventry attempted to suppress local airplay of the single. Peter Asher recalled hearing that the mayor felt the song "was insulting to his city or something", although Asher said of the reported boycott: "I don't know if some record company press hack dreamed that one up or if it was real. I [just] read [about] it".

In Australia, "Lady Godiva" reached #1 on the chart dated 29 October 1966, remaining at #1 for three weeks. The song also afforded Peter and Gordon a #1 hit in Canada and a moderate hit in the Netherlands (#30), South Africa (#18) and Sweden (#19).

Peter and Gordon returned to the US Top 40 with two subsequent singles: "Knight In Rusty Armour" and "Sunday for Tea", but "Lady Godiva" would be the duo's final UK hit.

A Side	B Side	United Kingdom		United States	
A Side	B Side	Release date	Record number	Release date	Record number
"Lady Godiva"	"Morning's Calling"	9 September 1966	Columbia DB 8003	September 1966 US	Capitol 5740

== Alex Day version ==
"Lady Godiva"

Single by Alex Day
- Released: 1 April 2012
- Recorded: 2011
- Genre: Pop
- Length: 2:28
- Songwriters: Mike Leander, Charlie Mills

Alex Day singles chronology
"Forever Yours" (2011)	"Lady Godiva" (2012)	"Stupid Stupid" (2012)

Audio sample
- file; help

In 2012, the song was covered and released as a single by English musician Alex Day who said: "I thought I'd pick an existing really great song and modernise it — I like introducing older music to my audience and this is a really fun way of doing that".

"Lady Godiva" was Day's first single to get a physical release in UK record stores, following a distribution deal with Universal Music. He got the deal because the ten-year-old son of the head of distribution at Universal was a fan of Day's band, Chameleon Circuit. "Lady Godiva" was included on Day's third album Epigrams and Interludes (2013). To promote the track, Day embarked on The Small Town Tour of the UK, signing copies of the single.

=== Music video ===
A music video to accompany the release of "Lady Godiva" was first released on YouTube on 14 March 2012. It was directed by Day and starred Carrie Hope Fletcher (known as ItsWayPastMyBedTime by the YouTube community) as the titular Lady, as well as Day playing various characters.

=== Promotion ===
Day posted a video for the subscribers to his YouTube channel, saying that, to encourage viewers to buy the song, he would send personalized thank-you videos to every person who sent him an email with the receipt of his song. He quickly deleted the video to stem a flood of video requests, but still received approximately ten thousand emails. He sent out the final thank-you video on 16 August 2012.

=== Chart performance ===
The track rose as high as #15 on the UK singles chart dated 8 April 2012, beating the #16 UK peak of the Peter and Gordon original.

Chart (2012)	Peak position
Ireland (IRMA)	49
Scottish Singles Sales (Official Charts)	16
UK Indie (Official Charts)	1
UK Singles (Official Charts)	15

== Other versions ==
Besides the original Paul Jones version on his 1966 album My Way, "Lady Godiva" was also recorded by Herb Alpert & the Tijuana Brass (Sounds Like...) and Young-Holt Unlimited (On-Stage). Both versions were instrumentals.
