= Forever Yours (Alex Day song) =

2011 single by Alex Day

Single by Alex Day

from the album Epigrams and Interludes
- Released: 10 November 2011
- Recorded: 2011
- Genre: Synth-pop, dance-pop
- Length: 2:52
- Songwriter: Alex Day
- Producer: Alex Day

Alex Day singles chronology
"Across the Sea" (2011)	"Forever Yours" (2011)	"Lady Godiva" (2012)

Audio sample
- file; help

Music video
- "Forever Yours" on YouTube

"Forever Yours" is a single recorded by English musician Alex Day from his studio album Epigrams and Interludes. It was released on 10 November 2011 in an effort to take the Christmas number one spot in the UK Singles Chart. The song's lyrics describe "accepting that all you will be with someone is friends and that being enough." Day has described the track as "a simple great dance-pop song that a lot of people can get behind."

== Campaign for Christmas Number 1 ==
"Forever Yours" was Day's third attempt to get into the charts using the internet. In 2009, Day was part of the Chartjackers project, which charted at number 36 in the UK. In 2010, Day was part of the collective "Sons of Admirals" along with three other YouTubers. The group's cover of Cat Stevens' song "Here Comes My Baby" peaked at number 61 in the UK Singles Chart.

"Forever Yours" was released on 11 November 2011, with the goal to raise as much money as possible, as most of the proceeds from the song will go to World Vision, an organization against child poverty. Day has since released more remixes and versions of the song to maximize profits and sales including an acoustic version and a demo version. Day launched the campaign as a response to X Factor singles routinely topping the UK Singles Chart on Christmas Day. He also created a YouTube holiday on December 18 called "Forever Day" as a way to let fans know when buying the single would count for the Christmas Day chart. The song was given 16–1 odds of topping the UK Singles Chart on Christmas by William Hill.

In the official 2011 mid-week Christmas charts and the official Christmas chart, Day charted at number four, selling over 50,000 copies in the United Kingdom, with Christmas number one going to Military Wives for their single "Wherever You Are". The single sold 100,000 copies worldwide in the same period. "Forever Yours" then dropped to number 112 the following week, setting a record for the biggest drop in UK Singles Chart history, falling 108 places. Had Day topped the chart, he would have been the first unsigned artist to do so.

== Music video ==
The music video for "Forever Yours" was directed by housemate and fellow YouTuber Charlotte McDonnell (formerly Charlie McDonnell), and was released on 1 December 2011. In the music video, Day acts as both a superhero and a zombie. Day has stated that "the theme of the song is friendship", and that they "just wanted to pay homage to the kind of silly videos you might make when you were young, with your mates". The music video received three million hits on YouTube within a month of its posting. The music video is currently unavailable on McDonnell's channel, due to allegations of inappropriate sexual behaviour made against Day.

== Track listing ==
Digital download

1. "Forever Yours" – 2:52

== Charts ==
Chart (2011)	Peak position
Canada (Canadian Hot 100)	79
Ireland (IRMA)	20
Netherlands (Single Top 100)	99
Scottish Singles Sales (Official Charts)	4
UK Indie (Official Charts)	2
UK Singles (Official Charts)	4
US Bubbling Under Hot 100 Singles (Billboard)	7

== Release history ==
Region	Date	Format
United Kingdom	10 November 2011	Digital download
