= Chameleon Circuit (band) =

English rock band

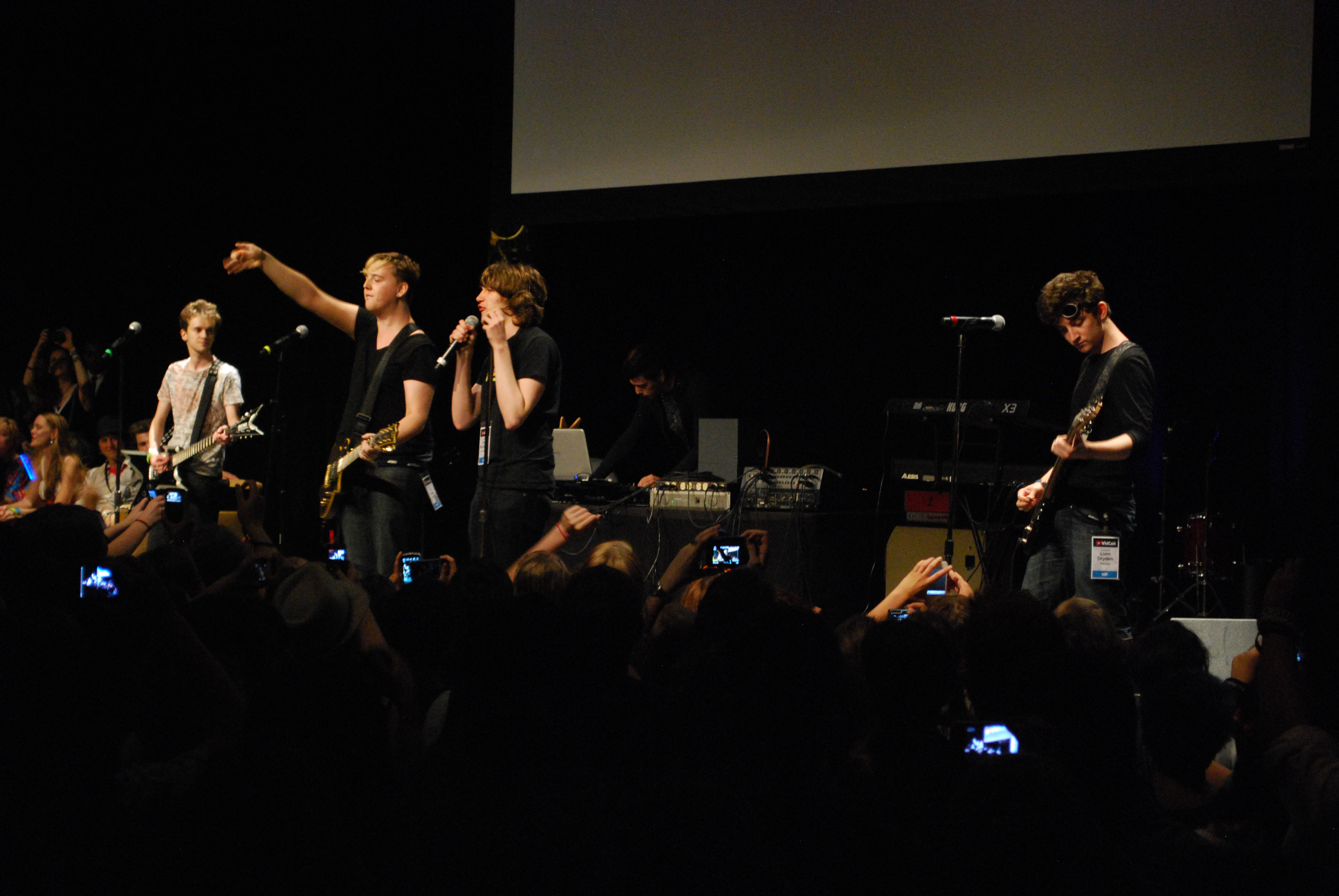
- Chameleon Circuit performing at VidCon, July 2011

Background information
- Origin: London, UK
- Genre: Rock
- Years active: 2008–2014
- Label: DFTBA Records
- Past members: Charlotte McDonnell; Liam Dryden; Michael Aranda; Chris Beattie; Ed Blann; Alex Day

Chameleon Circuit were an English rock band known for creating music inspired by the British television series Doctor Who. Composed of popular UK YouTube vloggers and Doctor Who fans, the band released their self-titled debut album on 1 June 2009.

At the beginning of 2011, Chameleon Circuit, in their new line-up of Alex Day, Charlotte McDonnell (formerly Charlie McDonnell), Liam Dryden, Ed Blann and American YouTuber Michael Aranda (who had originally signed up under a producing role), began work on their second album, Still Got Legs. It was released on 12 July 2011 and charted on the UK iTunes Album and Rock Album charts, and on the Billboard Heatseekers chart in the United States at #23.

== History ==
=== 2008–2009: Formation and debut album ===
Inspired by the growing phenomenon of Wizard rock, Alex Day, a YouTuber and fan of Doctor Who, was inspired to begin writing songs about the TV series in summer 2008, and dubbed the resulting genre "Time Lord Rock" (or "Trock" for short). Charlotte McDonnell, also a fan, did the same, and released an acoustic video performance of "Blink" – based on the episode of the same name – on YouTube. With the addition of Scottish vloggers Liam Dryden and Chris Beattie, Chameleon Circuit were formed and immediately began work on their first album. It was arranged to be released under the newly founded DFTBA Records, which had been set up by Alan Lastufka and Hank Green later the same year, to provide popular YouTube musicians an outlet for releasing their music professionally.

The release of Chameleon Circuit's debut album was delayed when conflict arose with their original producer, who did not want to complete production of the album. After unsuccessfully searching for a replacement producer, Chameleon Circuit were forced to release Chameleon Circuit uncompleted. Regardless, it still received some critical acclaim, including a positive review on Den of Geek and an article in Doctor Who Magazine. Former Doctor David Tennant, in an interview, described Chameleon Circuit as "proper decent music". In July 2010, their song "Count the Shadows" also appeared on DFTBA Records, Volume Two, a compilation sampler that was given for free in grab bags at VidCon 2010.

=== 2010–2014: Still Got Legs and hiatus ===
In late 2010, the members of Chameleon Circuit announced that work had begun on their second album, with American YouTuber Michael Aranda working as producer. In January 2011, Chameleon Circuit officially announced the departure of Chris Beattie and the addition of Ed Blann to the band, as well as the album title, Still Got Legs (so named for the Eleventh Doctor's exclamation upon his regeneration).

In April 2011 Chameleon Circuit found themselves struggling with producer trouble when Aranda was refused entry back into the UK by border officials after a trip to France. The band set up an online petition to help him re-enter England, and were successful. Aranda was granted a week's re-entry to the UK. Meanwhile, drink company Red Bull were made aware of Chameleon Circuit's predicament and offered to send the band to Paris to complete their recording. Following this incident, Aranda was announced as an official member of the band.

Chameleon Circuit finished their recording and played the album to a small number of fans at Red Bull's London studio in June 2011. The album was made available for pre-order the same weekend, and was released via DFTBA on 12 July 2011. The album charted on the Billboard Heatseekers chart at #23. On 31 July, Chameleon Circuit performed songs from Still Got Legs as well as a few from their first album, in a live show at VidCon 2011.

As a part of YouTube's Geek Week in August 2013, Chameleon Circuit released their music video for their track "Teenage Rebel", filmed partly in the set of the TARDIS used in the TV series. A second video for "The Doctor Is Dying" was released by the band in November 2013 as a part of BBC America and Nerdist's "Doctor Who Week", an event that took place on YouTube in the week building up to Doctor Who's 50th Anniversary Special. The band were also heavily featured in "The Story of Trock", a radio episode played on BBC Radio 1 on 25 November. The band provided interviews for the episode and songs from their discography comprised the bulk of its soundtrack.

In January 2014, in response to a question from a fan on his Tumblr blog, Alex Day confirmed that Ed Blann had decided to leave the band. After the public condemnation of Day following his admission to entering into manipulative relationships with women, the band began an unannounced hiatus.

In 2017, Aranda wrote in a Reddit AMA "I think it's safe to say that Chameleon Circuit is dead for now. I know that the last time Charlie and I spoke about it, [she] didn't feel interested in writing new music in general, and I know that my enthusiasm for Doctor Who in general has declined substantially over the last six years."

== Discography ==
Title	Album details	Peak chart positions
Title	Album details	US Heat
Chameleon Circuit	Released: 1 June 2009; Label: DFTBA Records; Formats: CD, digital download	—
Still Got Legs	Released: 12 July 2011; Label: DFTBA Records; Formats: CD, digital download	23
"—" denotes album that did not chart or was not released

== Music videos ==
Year	Name
2009	An Awful Lot of Running
2010	Type 40
2011	Doctor What (acoustic)
2013	Teenage Rebel
2013	The Doctor is Dying

== Band members ==
- Charlotte McDonnell – vocals, guitar, ukulele, keyboards, melodica, stylophone (2008–2014)
- Liam Dryden – vocals, keyboard, bass (2008–2014)
- Michael Aranda – backing vocals, guitar, bass, keyboard, drums, percussion, turntables, sampling (2011–2014)
- Chris Beattie – vocals, guitar, ukulele (2008–2009)
- Ed Blann – vocals, guitar (2011–2014)
- Alex Day – vocals, guitar, bass (2008–2014)
