= Version =

Version may refer to:

== Computing ==
- Software version, text that identifies a version of a software entity
- VERSION (CONFIG.SYS directive), a configuration directive in FreeDOS
- Version control, a component of software configuration management

== Music ==
- Cover version
- Dub version
- Remix
- Version (album), a 2007 album by Mark Ronson
- Versions (Poison the Well album), 2007
- Versions (Thievery Corporation album), 2006
- Versions (MYMP album), 2005
- Versions (Robby Krieger album), 1982
- Versions (Zola Jesus album), 2013

== Other ==
- Bible version debate
- Version (eye)
- External cephalic version
- Versions of the Bible
- Version (probability theory), a modification of a stochastic process
