= Carrie Hope Fletcher =

English entertainer and author (born 1992)

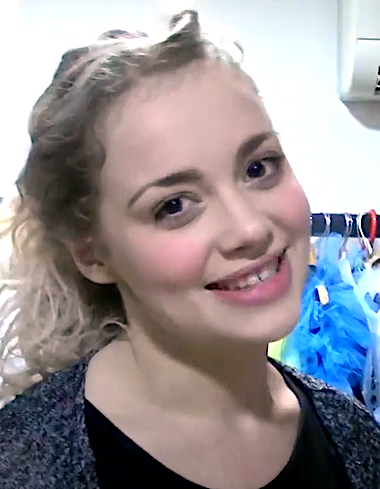
- Fletcher in 2016
- Born: Carrie Hope Fletcher; 22 October 1992 (age 34); South Harrow, London, England
- Occupations: Actor; singer-songwriter; author
- Years active: 1999–present
- Spouse: Joel Montague (m. 2023)
- Children: 1
- Relatives: Tom Fletcher (brother); Giovanna Fletcher (sister-in-law)
- Awards: WhatsOnStage Award for Best Takeover in a Role (2014); WhatsOnStage Awards for Best Actress in a Musical (2018, 2019); WhatsOnStage Awards for Best Performer in a Female Identifying Role (2022)

Carrie Hope Fletcher (born 22 October 1992) is an English West End theatre actress and singer. Her performances include the roles of Éponine and Fantine in Les Misérables, starring as Veronica Sawyer in the original West End production of Heathers: The Musical, and originating the role of Cinderella in Andrew Lloyd Webber's Cinderella. Outside of her theatre work, Carrie has a large social media following with over half a million subscribers on YouTube. As well as this, she has written several bestselling novels for children and adults.

In 2015, Fletcher published a book called: All I Know Now: Wonderings and Reflections on Growing Up Gracefully, which was a Number 1 bestseller in the UK. Since then, she has published multiple novels and two children's books.

== Early life ==
Fletcher was born and grew up in South Harrow, in the London borough of Harrow.

== Career ==
As a child, Fletcher played small roles on television and appeared in musical theatre in London's West End in Chitty Chitty Bang Bang, Mary Poppins and Les Misérables. In 2011, she started a YouTube channel called ItsWayPastMyBedTime, later retitled Carrie Hope Fletcher, which features music and vlogs. She has no formal training in musical theatre.

=== Theatre ===
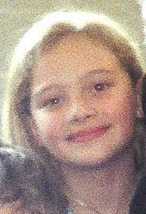
Fletcher with the cast of Mary Poppins in July 2004.

Fletcher made her West End debut as Young Éponine in Les Misérables at the age of seven in 2001. In 2002, she was part of the original cast of Chitty Chitty Bang Bang in the role of Jemima Potts, and in 2004 featured as Jane Banks in Mary Poppins. Fletcher replaced Danielle Hope as Éponine in Les Misérables at the Queen's Theatre, London in June 2013. She is the only British actress to have played young Éponine, older Éponine and Fantine in the production. On 23 February 2014, Fletcher was presented the WhatsOnStage "Best Takeover in a Role" award for her performance as Éponine.

In November 2014, Fletcher took a hiatus from her role in Les Misérables to join the cast of the national arena tour of Jeff Wayne's Musical Version of The War of the Worlds in which she played the role of Beth, alongside Jason Donovan, Brian McFadden and Shayne Ward.

She next returned to Les Misérables, playing Éponine for the musical's 30th anniversary gala performance on 8 October 2015. Fletcher played her final performance on 13 February 2016, at which time she was the longest-running Éponine in the London production's 30-year history.

In 2017, she played the role of Wednesday Addams on the UK tour of The Addams Family. The production was produced by James Yeoburn and Stuart Matthew Price for United Theatrical and Music & Lyrics in association with Festival Theatre, Edinburgh. In December 2017, she performed at The Hammersmith Apollo in the musical The Christmasaurus, based on her brother Tom Fletcher's novel of the same name.

In 2018, Fletcher played Veronica in the Original West End Production of Heathers: The Musical, the musical adaptation of the movie of the same name. The show originally opened at The Other Palace before moving to the Theatre Royal Haymarket. She also reprised her role as Beth in the 40th anniversary tour of Jeff Wayne's War of the Worlds.

In 2019, she returned to Les Misérables as Fantine at the Gielgud Theatre, in a fully staged concert adaptation of the musical.

Fletcher was announced to be playing Cinderella in Andrew Lloyd Webber's Cinderella, a retelling of the original fairytale, in February 2020. Prior to the announcement, she workshopped Cinderella at The Other Palace Theatre in 2019. It opened in August 2021 to mostly positive reviews. Fletcher won the 2021 WhatsOnStage Award for Best Actress in a Musical for her performance in Cinderella. The production closed on 12 June 2022, 8 months early. Fletcher and other cast members who were not present at 1 May's matinee were not informed of the closure until after the public announcement.

=== Writing ===
In April 2015, Fletcher released her first book, All I Know Now: Wonderings and Reflections on Growing Up Gracefully, based on her blog of the same name. The non-fiction book focuses on stages of Fletcher's life as a teenager and passes on life lessons and advice through highlighting her own mistakes and struggles as she grew up. Her book was a number one Sunday Times bestseller and remained in the Top 10 list for seven weeks.

=== Music ===
Fletcher has produced two singles, "Running Through Rivers" and "The Way We Were". She performed to benefit the band Sheytoons at the St. James Theatre, as well as Ramin Karimloo on his 2012 Road to Find Out tour.

Fletcher is featured in Alex Day's 2013 album Epigrams and Interludes on the songs covering "Poison" and "This Kiss". Fletcher can also be seen in The Vamps' music video for their cover of McFly's "That Girl". In 2014, Fletcher had featured in Daniel Koek's album High in the song "Remember Me". Koek was a fellow cast member of Fletcher's in Les Misérables.

Her most successful video on YouTube, currently with 1.7 million views (as of 23 April 2024), is a live interpretation together with her brother Tom Fletcher of the McFly song "Love Is on the Radio".

Fletcher released her first solo album When The Curtain Falls on 30 March 2018. It was released via musical theatre concert and record producers Club 11 London and accompanied her first four solo concerts at Cadogan Hall, London, on 31 March and 1 April 2018.

In 2023, she embarked on her first solo UK concert tour,

== Discography ==
=== Studio albums ===
| Title | Album details | Peak chart position | |
| Title | Album details | UK | IRE |
|---|---|---|---|
| When the Curtain Falls | Release date: 31 March 2018; Label: 23:00; Format: CD, digital download | – | – |

=== Singles ===
| Year | Title | Peak chart positions | | Album |
| Year | Title | UK | SCO | Album |
|---|---|---|---|---|
| 2020 | "Bad Cinderella" | – | – | Andrew Lloyd Webber's "Cinderella" |
| 2020 | "Far Too Late" | – | – | Andrew Lloyd Webber's "Cinderella" |
| 2021 | "I Know I Have A Heart" | – | – | Andrew Lloyd Webber's "Cinderella" |

=== Music videos ===
| Year | Song | Director |
|---|---|---|
| 2021 | "I Know I Have A Heart" | N/A |
| 2021 | "Bad Cinderella" | N/A |

=== Cast recordings ===
| Title | Album details | Peak chart position | | |
| Title | Album details | UK | US Indie | US Cast Albums |
|---|---|---|---|---|
| Chitty Chitty Bang Bang (Original West End Cast Recording) | Release date: 26 August 2002; Label: Mr Bang Bang; Format: Audio CD | – | – | – |
| Heathers: The Musical (Original West End Cast Recording) | Release date: 1 March 2019; Label: Sh-K-Boom Records; Format: Digital Download | 24 | 3 | 35 |
| Les Misérables: The Staged Concert (The Sensational 2020 Live Recording) | Release date: 20 November 2020; Label: Rhino; Format: Digital Download | – | – | – |
| Cinderella (Original West End Cast Recording) | Release date: Spring 2021; Label: Polydor; Format: Digital Download | – | – | – |

== Theatre credits ==
| Year | Production | Role | Theatre | Location | Notes and awards |
|---|---|---|---|---|---|
| 2001–02 | Les Misérables | Young Éponine Thérnadier | Palace Theatre | West End | |
| 2002–03 | Chitty Chitty Bang Bang | Jemima Potts | London Palladium | West End | Features on the Original Cast Recording |
| 2004–05 | Mary Poppins | Jane Banks | Prince Edward Theatre | West End | Features on the Original Cast Recording |
| 2005 | The Wind in the Willows | Weasel/Duck | Regents Park Open Air Theatre | Off-West End | |
| 2013–16 | Les Misérables | Éponine Thénardier | Queen's Theatre | West End | Awarded the "WhatsOnStage.com Award for Best Takeover in a Role" |
| 2014 | Jeff Wayne's Musical Version of The War of the Worlds | Beth | —N/a | UK national tour | |
| 2016 | Chitty Chitty Bang Bang | Truly Scrumptious | —N/a | UK national tour | Nominated for the WhatsOnStage Award for Best Actress in a Musical |
| 2016 | Les Misérables | Éponine Thénardier | Dubai Opera | Dubai | |
| 2016 | A Christmas Carol | Emily | Lyceum Theatre | West End | |
| 2017 | The Addams Family | Wednesday Addams | —N/a | UK national tour | Awarded the WhatsOnStage Award for Best Actress in a Musical |
| 2017 | The Christmasaurus | Brenda | Eventim Apollo | Off-West End | |
| 2018 | The Railway Children | Narrator | Cadogan Hall | Off-West End | |
| 2018 | Heathers: The Musical | Veronica Sawyer | The Other Palace | Off-West End | Awarded the WhatsOnStage Award for Best Actress in a Musical Features on the Original West End Cast Recording |
| 2018 | Heathers: The Musical | Veronica Sawyer | Theatre Royal Haymarket | West End | Awarded the WhatsOnStage Award for Best Actress in a Musical Features on the Original West End Cast Recording |
| 2018 | Jeff Wayne's Musical Version of The War of the Worlds | Beth | —N/a | UK national tour | |
| 2019 | But I'm a Cheerleader | Graham Eaton | The Other Palace | Off-West End | Part of MTFestUK |
| 2019 | Jeff Wayne's The War of the Worlds: The Immersive Experience | Beth | —N/a | UK national tour | |
| 2019 | Les Miserables: The Staged Concert | Fantine | Gielgud Theatre | West End | |
| 2019–20 | Les Misérables | Fantine | Sondheim Theatre | West End | |
| 2020 | Les Misérables: The Staged Concert | Fantine | Sondheim Theatre | West End | Nominated for the 2022 Grammy Award for Best Musical Theater Album |
| 2021–22 | Cinderella | Cinderella | Gillian Lynne Theatre | West End | Featured on the Original Cast Recording; Awarded the WhatsOnStage Award for Best Actress in a Musical; Nominated for the 2022 Grammy Award for Best Musical Theater Album |
| 2022 | The Witches of Eastwick | Sukie Rougemont | Sondheim Theatre | West End | One night only; concert production |
| 2022 | Treason The Musical | Martha Percy | Theatre Royal, Drury Lane | West End | Two nights only; concert production |
| 2022 | The Caucasian Chalk Circle | Grusha Vashnadze | Rose Theatre | Kingston | |
| 2022–23 | Sleeping Beauty | Carrabosse | Marlowe Theatre | Canterbury | Pantomime debut |
| 2023 | Once | Girl | London Palladium | West End | Two nights only; concert production |
| 2023 | The Crown Jewels | Mrs. Edwards, Lady of the Bedchamber | Garrick Theatre | West End | |
| 2023 | Sleeping Beauty | Carrabosse | Hawth Theatre | Crawley | 2nd pantomime appearance |
| 2024–25 | Calamity Jane | Calamity Jane | —N/a | UK national tour | |
| 2025–26 | Elf the Musical | Jovie | Aldwych Theatre | West End | |
| 2026 | Waitress | Jenna Hunterson | —N/a | UK national tour | Select venues only |
| 2027 | Ballad Lines | Sarah | The Other Palace | Off-West End | 12-week run from 11 April to 4 July 2027. |

== Personal life ==
Fletcher announced on 14 February 2014 that she had been dating fellow YouTuber Alex Day since October 2013. However, Fletcher announced their break-up via Twitter on 14 March 2014.

Fletcher began dating fellow musical theatre performer Oliver Ormson in 2017 after the two performed together in the UK tour of The Addams Family. Their relationship ended in January 2022.

In February 2023, Fletcher married theatre actor Joel Montague at Gretna Green in Gretna, Dumfries and Galloway, Scotland. Together, they have one child, a daughter, Mabel Hope (b. March 1, 2024).

== Published works ==
- All I Know Now: Wonderings and Reflections on Growing Up Gracefully (Sphere, 2015) ISBN 978-0-75-155751-0
- Winters Snow (Sphere, 2017) ISBN 978-0-75-156870-7
- On The Other Side (Sphere, 2017) ISBN 978-0-75-156316-0
- All That She Can See (Sphere, 2018) ISBN 978-0-75-156320-7
- When The Curtain Falls (Sphere, 2019) ISBN 978-0-75-156320-7
- In the Time We Lost (Sphere, 2019) ISBN 978-0-75-157126-4
- Into the Spotlight (Puffin, 2020) ISBN 978-0-24-146209-6
- With This Kiss (HQ, 2022) ISBN 978-0-00-840095-8
- The Double Trouble Society (Puffin, 2022) ISBN 978-0-24-155890-4
- The Double Trouble Society and the Worst Curse (Puffin, 2023) ISBN 978-0241558942

| Preceded by Rachael Beck | Actress to portray Truly Scrumptious; 4 May 2016 – 2 October 2016 | Succeeded by Charlotte Wakefield |
