= Charlotte McDonnell =

English vlogger and filmmaker (born 1990)

- Born: 1 October 1990 (age 36); Bath, Somerset, England
- Other names: coollike Charlie McDonnell charlieissocoollike
- Known for: Vlogging, filmmaking, music, screenwriting, streaming

YouTube information
- Channel: charlotteissocoollike
- Years active: 2007–2018; 2023–present
- Subscribers: 2.09 million
- Views: 301 million (2007–2022); 1.7 million (2023–present)
- Last updated: 5 March 2025

Charlotte McDonnell (formerly Charlie McDonnell; born 1 October 1990) is an English filmmaker, screenwriter, musician, former vlogger, author and Twitch streamer from Bath, Somerset. On 15 June 2011, her YouTube channel charlieissocoollike became the first in the United Kingdom to reach one million subscribers.

As a musician, McDonnell was a member of Doctor Who–themed rock band Chameleon Circuit and the short-lived musical project Sons of Admirals until it disbanded in May 2011. In 2010, McDonnell released a solo album titled This Is Me. She also directed a series of short films from 2013 to 2014, and co-hosted the weekday morning YouTube breakfast show Cereal Time with Capital FM presenter and fellow YouTube vlogger Jimmy Hill from 2015 to 2016.

After over a decade of regular uploads, McDonnell ended her YouTube career in December 2018 and moved on to screenwriting and television production. Her first series, the science fiction drama Don't Look Deeper, was released on the streaming platform Quibi in July 2020. McDonnell creates content on Twitch, where she plays different video games.

== Early life and education ==
McDonnell was born on 1 October 1990 and raised in Bath, Somerset to parents Lindsey and Mark. She has two younger siblings: her brother, William, and her sister, Bridie. She was educated at Beechen Cliff School, a local state comprehensive foundation school.

== YouTube career ==
After setting up the YouTube channel, charlieissocoollike on 3 April 2007, McDonnell started posting video blogs (or vlogs) to a small audience. She first came to prominence when her video titled How To Get Featured on YouTube became popular after it was featured on YouTube's UK homepage. Her audience jumped from just under 150 subscribers to over 4,000 in two days. She created her YouTube channel as a form of procrastination while revising for her GCSE.

In January 2008, in celebration of gaining 25,000 subscribers, McDonnell asked for 25 challenge suggestions from subscribers, which sparked her series of Challenge Charlie videos. She completed all of these challenges by March 2013, one of which was suggested by TV presenter Phillip Schofield and his daughter Molly, challenging McDonnell to perform the dance that accompanies the song "Hoedown Throwdown" from Hannah Montana: The Movie.

McDonnell surpassed 100,000 subscribers in 2008, one million in June 2011—the first in the United Kingdom to do so—and two million subscribers in May 2013. Most of McDonnell's videos end with an outro by Stephen Fry. By early 2013, McDonnell was earning more money from her job than her parents. In 2014, McDonnell's YouTube Channel was listed on New Media Rockstars Top 100 Channels, ranked at #63.

Around 2013, McDonnell began to feel "burned out" from content creation and realised she "felt much happier not being on camera". She moved to Toronto, Canada, in 2017, and began working with the production company New Form. In March 2019, McDonnell announced on Twitter that she had quit YouTube to focus on screenwriting. She currently streams on Twitch with the account name coollike.

In January 2023, McDonnell posted a YouTube video in which she discussed her life and for the first time publicly, announced "I'm a transgender woman, [and] my pronouns are she/they". Coinciding with this video's release, all of her pre-transition videos were privated.

== Short films and screenwriting career ==
On 8 March 2013, McDonnell announced that she would be making five short films. In a video published on 27 October 2014, she announced her last two films would actually be one film, split into two parts.

Short films
Title	Release date	Writer(s)	Producer	Genre	Ref.
The Tea Chronicles	23 May 2013	McDonnell and Khyan Mansley	Matt Diegan	Psychological horror comedy	
Offline	14 December 2013	Alan Flanagan and McDonnell	Emily Diana Ruth	Disaster comedy	
Strangers in a Bed	28 June 2014	Michael Aranda and McDonnell	Emily Diana Ruth	Western drama	
Our Brother	29–30 October 2014	McDonnell	Emily Diana Ruth	Drama	

On 27 July 2020, Don't Look Deeper, a 14-episode series co-created by McDonnell and Jeffrey Lieber, premiered on Quibi. McDonnell wrote several episodes of the series.

== Music career ==
=== Chameleon Circuit ===
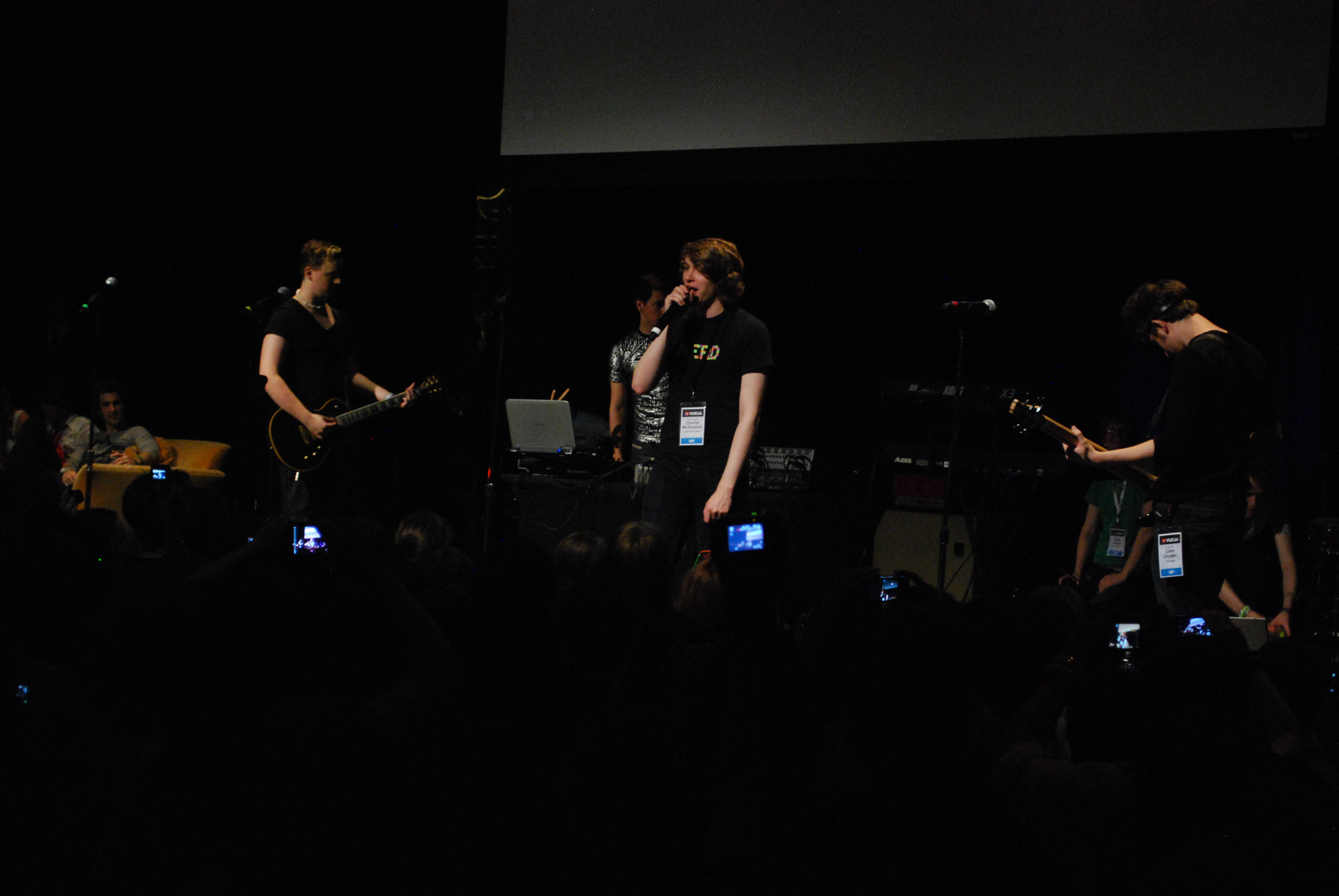
McDonnell performing with Chameleon Circuit at VidCon 2011

McDonnell was one of the founding members of Chameleon Circuit, a band known for creating music inspired by the British television series Doctor Who. Along with fellow vloggers Alex Day (Nerimon on YouTube), Liam Dryden (Littleradge), and former member Chris Beattie (CowInParachute), Chameleon Circuit released their self-titled debut album on 1 June 2009. In July 2010, their song Count the Shadows also appeared on DFTBA Records, Volume Two, a compilation sampler that was given for free in the grab bags at VidCon 2010. At the beginning of 2011, Chameleon Circuit, in their new line-up following the departure of Beattie and the addition of Ed Blann and Michael Aranda, began work on their second album Still Got Legs. It was released on 12 July 2011.

In 2014, McDonnell and Dryden publicly denounced members Blann and Day, who both suspended their online presence following separate reported incidents of sexual abuse. McDonnell, Dryden and Aranda appeared together at VidCon 2014 for photo signings. In 2017, Aranda wrote in a Reddit AMA that "it's safe to say that Chameleon Circuit is dead for now. I know that the last time Charlie and I spoke about it, [she] didn't feel interested in writing new music in general."

=== Sons of Admirals ===
In 2010, McDonnell, along with three other YouTubers, Alex Day, Ed Blann, and Tom Milsom ("Hexachordal") formed a new musical project titled "Sons of Admirals". The musical project was not a band in the traditional sense, but a collection of solo artists who played together as a group. The nominal inspiration for the band came from the Admiral's Men, a Shakespearean group of actors that came together to perform, whilst still retaining their individual careers.

Their first single was released via YouTube on 14 June 2010 on McDonnell's channel: the group covered Cat Stevens' song "Here Comes My Baby", featuring all four members on vocals. The track peaked at No. 61 in the UK. In October 2010 the band released an EP including "Here Comes My Baby"; an acoustic version of the same song; a cover of "Believe in Yourself", the theme of children's television show Arthur; the music video of "Here Comes My Baby"; and a behind-the-scenes video. Sons of Admirals disbanded in May 2011, publishing a statement on their website that "the core goal of the group – to get into the charts, and to increase exposure for the group members' individual talents proved to run against too many of our beliefs and approaches to music and promotion".

=== Solo career ===
A prominent feature of McDonnell's YouTube channel were the songs which she wrote and performed herself, most often on ukulele. The most popular being "Duet with Myself." On 1 December 2010, in response to demand, she released her debut album, entitled This Is Me, via DFTBA Records. The album features several songs from her channel that were remixed for the album, as well as several previously unreleased songs. In December 2016, she teamed up with Project for Awesome to release A Very Gideon Christmas, an exclusive Christmas EP sung from the perspective of and with the imaginary inflections of her cat Gideon.

=== Music videos ===
- In The Absence Of Christmas (2008)
- A Song About Acne (2009)
- Duet with Myself (2009)
- A Song About Love (2010)
- Chemical Love (2010)
- A Song About Monkeys (2010)
- Time to Reply (2012)

== Charity and media work ==
On 30 September 2008, to celebrate her 18th birthday, McDonnell and Alex Day dyed and then shaved their hair off whilst live on BlogTV for a period of seven and a half hours in aid of Cancer Research UK. They managed to raise nearly £5000. The broadcast viewership peaked at 4,500.

In October 2009, McDonnell was named as one of a number of prominent YouTube users who would be participating in a project called RNLI Shout. The aim of the project is to raise money to purchase a lifeboat for the Royal National Lifeboat Institution.

In the autumn of 2009, McDonnell featured with three other YouTube users on the BBC Switch documentary series Chartjackers. The programme documented their attempt to achieve a number one single in the UK Singles Chart within 10 weeks, by crowdsourcing resources provided by the online community. McDonnell was cast in the series for her familiarity to young British YouTube viewers. Over the course of Chartjackers, McDonnell solicited lyrics, music, performers and stylists to record the final single and video via a YouTube channel named ChartJackersProject. An unofficial charity single for Children in Need, the completed song was titled "I've Got Nothing" and was sung by vocalists Miranda Chartrand and Adam Nichols. McDonnell edited the single's official music video, which was shown nationwide on British music channels such as 4Music and Viva. "I've Got Nothing" was released exclusively through the iTunes Store at midnight on 9 November 2009 and reached No. 36 on the UK Singles Chart. Sales of the single raised a total of approximately £10,000 for Children in Need.

McDonnell was purportedly approached to be a housemate on the eighth series, and first revived series, of Celebrity Big Brother but declined the offer.

In October 2013, it was announced that McDonnell was to play the main voice role along with Danny Wallace in Mike Bithell's indie video game Volume. The game was released in 2015 for PS4, PC and Mac and in 2016 for PlayStation Vita.

In 2014, McDonnell worked with the Home Office on their This Is Abuse Campaign, alongside other prominent YouTubers, in order to educate people about the importance of consensual sex. She also made a video regarding consent on her YouTube channel.

=== Presenting roles ===
On 6 June 2010, McDonnell presented the YouTube Audience Award to The Inbetweeners as part of the British Academy of Film and Television Arts Television Awards.

In July 2010 McDonnell was signed up alongside KateModern star Emma Pollard and X Factor contestants Nicola and Fran Gleadall to present a TV show run by Piers Morgan called FirstTV, an offshoot of First News newspaper. On FirstTV McDonnell did a few challenges like trying to break a Guinness world record by typing the alphabet on an iPad keyboard quickest and she got asked to tell a joke. However, after filming four episodes of FirstTV, McDonnell decided to leave the show because she did not enjoy presenting pre-scripted work.

On 4 September 2010, McDonnell and fellow YouTuber Myles Dyer co-presented Stickaid, a 24-hour live web show. Starting from 12:00 noon BST, the two hosted the fifth annual charity event from Middlesex University's Trent Park campus in London. Their goal was to raise £10,000 ($15,900), which they more than doubled. All the proceedings went to UNICEF.

In November 2010, McDonnell was part of a group of YouTube videos called The Science of Attraction where she hosted a few experiments and had her body digitally swapped with somebody else's. She was a co-presenter with Kat Akingbade and Derren Brown. As part of the series, eight videos were produced. In December 2010, McDonnell filmed a series of behind-the-scenes videos for Doctor Who Confidential during the filming of the Doctor Who Christmas special "A Christmas Carol".

They co-hosted the weekday morning YouTube breakfast show Cereal Time with Capital FM presenter and fellow YouTube vlogger Jimmy Hill from 2015 to 2016.

== Other activities ==
In 2016, McDonnell published a book, Fun Science.

On 5 May 2025, McDonnell and Libby Watson released their podcast, What's All This Then.

== Personal life ==
McDonnell is an atheist.

In March 2014, McDonnell announced on her blog that she had terminated her friendship with frequent collaborator Alex Day, stating that "I just don't feel able to call Alex a friend of mine anymore", following allegations that Day had sexually manipulated and emotionally abused women, and cheated on past girlfriends.

In October 2022, McDonnell came out as transgender on Instagram, using the trans flag in her post and announcing she would start going by she/they pronouns. In January 2023, McDonnell came out as a trans woman on YouTube, and announced she began feminising hormone therapy in September 2022. She also stated in a Q&A that she is bisexual. In June 2024, McDonnell stated she was using the name Charlotte.
