= Brian Epstein =

English music entrepreneur (1934–1967)

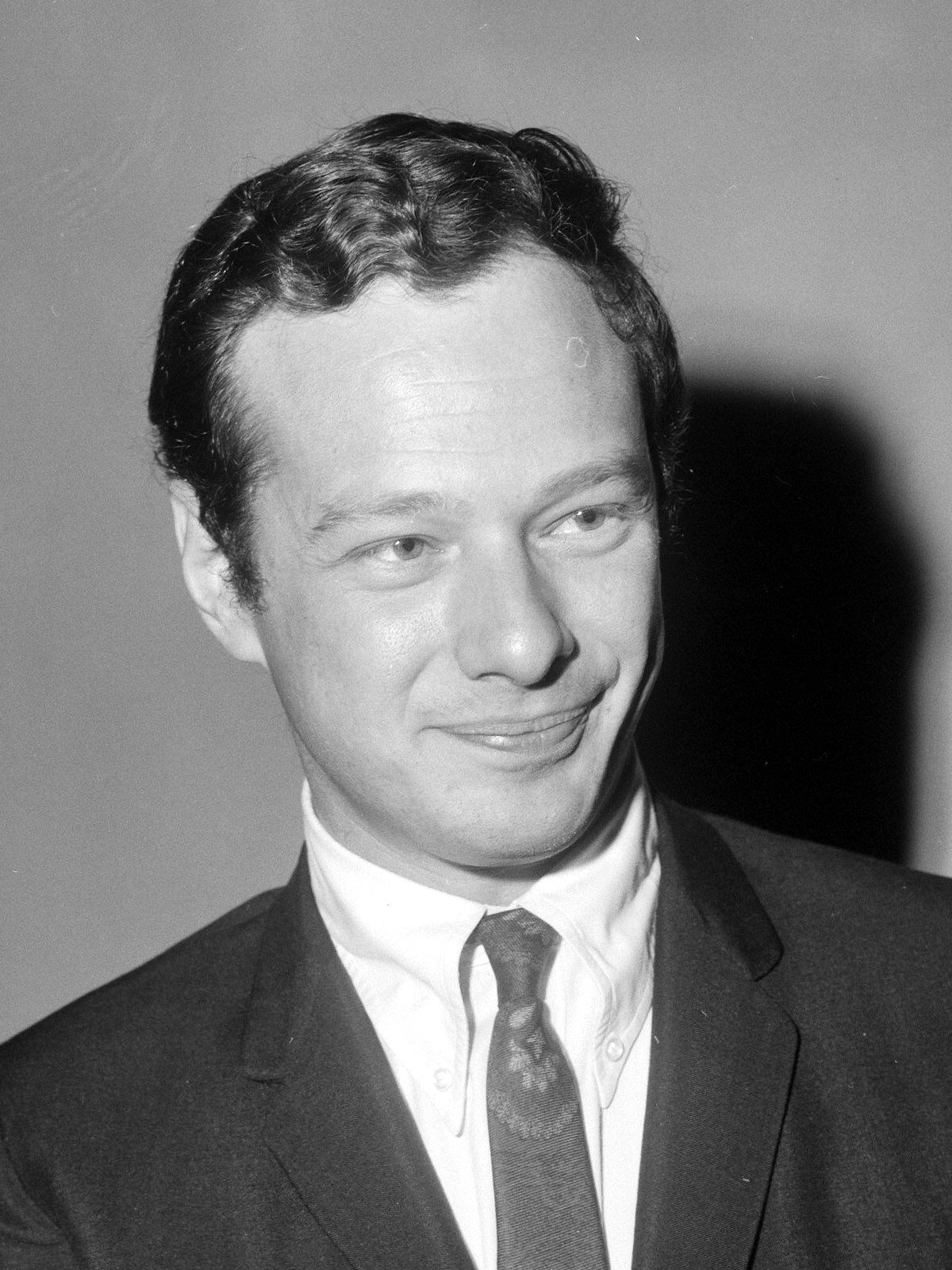
- Epstein receiving the Edison Award for the Beatles at the Grand Gala du Disque 1965
- Born: Brian Samuel Epstein; 19 September 1934; Liverpool, England
- Died: 27 August 1967 (aged 32); London, England
- Education: Royal Academy of Dramatic Art; Wrekin College; Liverpool College; Clayesmore School
- Occupations: Businessman; personal manager; impresario
- Years active: 1961–1967
- Manager of: The Beatles; Gerry and the Pacemakers; Billy J. Kramer and the Dakotas; The Moody Blues; The Fourmost; Cilla Black; Tommy Quickly; The Remo Four; The Cyrkle; Rory Storm and the Hurricanes; The Big Three

Brian Samuel Epstein (/ˈɛpstaɪn/ EP-styne; 19 September 1934 – 27 August 1967) was an English band manager and music entrepreneur who managed the Beatles from 1961 until his death in 1967.

Epstein was born into a family of successful retailers in Liverpool, who put him in charge of their music shop, where he displayed a gift for talent-spotting. He first met the Beatles in 1961 at a lunchtime concert at Liverpool's Cavern Club. Although he had no experience of artist management, Epstein put them under contract and insisted that they abandon their scruffy image in favour of a new clean-cut style. He also attempted to get the Beatles a recording contract, eventually securing a deal with EMI's Parlophone label.

Within months, the Beatles were international stars. Some of Epstein's other young discoveries had also prospered under his management. They included Gerry and the Pacemakers, Billy J. Kramer and the Dakotas, Tommy Quickly, Cilla Black and The Big Three. In 1967, he died of a combined alcohol and barbiturate overdose, ruled as accidental, at the age of 32.

== Ancestry ==
Epstein's grandfather, Isaac Epstein, was Lithuanian-Jewish. He arrived in Britain in the 1890s at the age of eighteen, from what was then part of the Russian Empire. His grandmother, Dinah, was the daughter of Joseph, a draper, and Esther Hyman, who had emigrated from Russia to Britain circa 1871/72 with their eldest son, Jacob. The Hymans had six other children.

Isaac Epstein married Dinah Hyman in Manchester in 1900. In 1901, Isaac and Dinah were living at 80 Walton Road, Liverpool, with Isaac's sister Rachael Epstein, above the furniture dealership that he founded. Their third child was Brian's father, Harry.

Eventually the family moved to a larger home in the Anfield area of Liverpool, at 27 Anfield Road. After Harry and his brother Leslie had joined the family firm, Isaac Epstein founded Epstein and Sons. He enlarged the furniture business by taking over adjacent shops at 62/72 Walton Road to sell a range of other goods, such as musical instruments and household appliances. They called the expanding business NEMS (North End Music Stores), which offered lenient credit terms. Paul McCartney's father once bought a piano from them. Epstein's mother Malka (nicknamed "Queenie" by her family, as Malka means "queen" in Hebrew) was also involved in the Hyman furniture business, which also owned the Sheffield Veneering Company. Harry and Queenie married in 1933.

== Early life ==
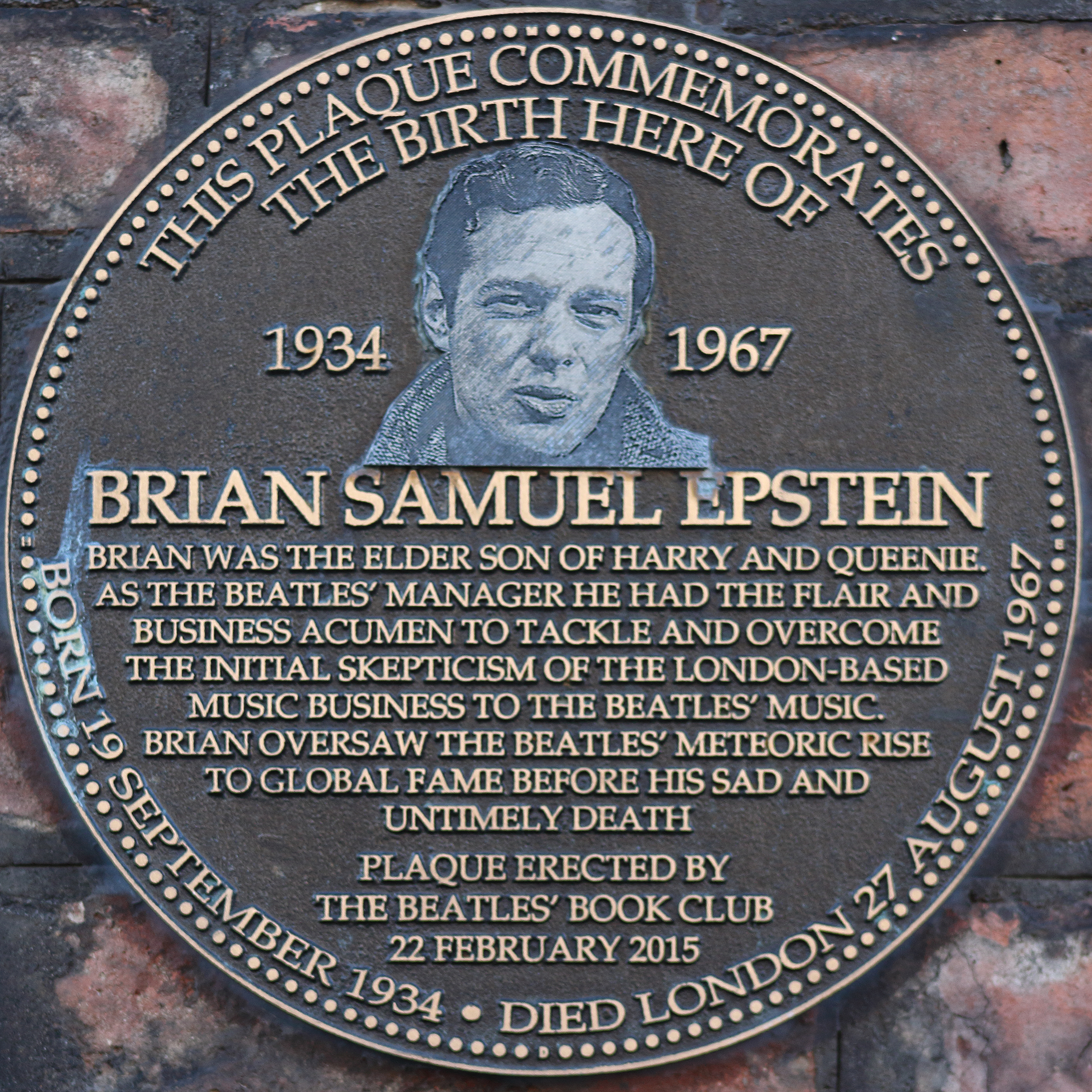
Commemorative plaque at Epstein's birthplace, 4 Rodney Street, Liverpool

Brian Epstein was born on 19 September 1934 at 4 Rodney Street, Liverpool. Harry and Queenie had a second son, Clive, 22 months later. During World War II the Epsteins moved to Southport, where two schools expelled Epstein for laziness and poor performance, but the family returned to Liverpool in 1945. The Epsteins lived at 197 Queens Drive, Childwall in Liverpool, and remained there for the next 30 years. The family was aided by a live-in nanny.

Epstein's parents moved him from one boarding school to another, including Clayesmore School in Dorset, Liverpool College, and a Jewish school in Kent. He spent two years at Wrekin College in Wellington, Shropshire, where he was taught the violin. At Wrekin, Epstein suffered from the strict culture, possibly in part as a result of his suppressed homosexuality. Epstein fell in love with the arts, particularly theatre, and it was his one consistently successful school subject. His favourite book as a child was Pamela Brown's The Swish of the Curtain. Shortly before his 16th birthday he sent a long letter to his father stating that he wanted to become a dress designer, but Harry Epstein was adamantly opposed, and after serving a six months' apprenticeship at another company his son finally had to "report for duty" at the family's furniture shop on a £5 per week wage.

In December 1952, Epstein was conscripted to do his national service as a data entry clerk into the Royal Army Service Corps, and was posted to the Albany Street Barracks near Regent's Park in London in spring 1953, where he was often reprimanded for not collecting his army pay. Epstein used this posting to explore London's high culture for the first time and also visited local relatives. By January 1954, Epstein had seen numerous Army psychiatrists, who recommended an early medical discharge.

After returning to Liverpool, he was put in charge of the Clarendon Furnishing shop in Hoylake and in 1955 was made a director of NEMS. In September 1956, he took a trip to London to meet a friend but after being there for only one day, was robbed of his passport, birth certificate, chequebook, wristwatch, and all the money he had in his possession. He did not want his parents to find out, so he worked as a department store clerk until he had earned enough money to buy a train ticket back to Liverpool. On returning home he confessed his homosexuality to a psychiatrist—a friend of the Epstein family—who suggested to Harry Epstein that his son should leave Liverpool as soon as possible. During the sessions, Epstein revealed his ambition of becoming an actor, so his parents allowed him to go to London to study.

In autumn 1956, Epstein enrolled in a two-year course at the Royal Academy of Dramatic Art (RADA) in London. His RADA classmates included actors Susannah York, Albert Finney, and Peter O'Toole, but Epstein dropped out after the third term, saying that he had become "too much of a businessman to enjoy being a student, and I didn't like being a student at all." He said in 1964 that he had "felt like an old man at the age of 21". He also revealed that he would have liked to produce a theatre play, or even act, "in something by Chekhov", or a "straight drama" by John Osborne.

In late April 1957, while a RADA student, Epstein was arrested for soliciting an undercover police officer for sex near the Swiss Cottage tube station. (Homosexual sex for men was illegal in Britain at this time.) He appeared in a Marylebone courthouse the next day and pleaded not guilty. He was sentenced to two years' probation. While still serving probation in May 1958, he was assaulted by a casual sex partner in Liverpool and extorted for hush money. Epstein reported the encounter to the police, forcing him to testify in court and reveal his sexual orientation to his family. The court barred the press from revealing Epstein's identity during the trial. His assailant was sentenced to serve two years in jail, and Epstein was not charged.

After his withdrawal from RADA, Epstein returned to Liverpool, where his father put his son in charge of the record department of the family's newly opened NEMS music store on Great Charlotte Street. Epstein worked "day and night" at the store to make it a success, and it became one of the biggest musical retail outlets in Northern England. The Epsteins opened a second store at 12–14 Whitechapel, and Epstein was put in charge of the entire operation. He often walked across the road to the Lewis's department store (which also had a music section) where Peter Brown was employed. He watched Brown's sales technique and was impressed enough to lure him to work for NEMS with the offer of a higher salary and a commission on sales. Through his work in the record department at NEMS, Epstein gained considerable knowledge of the pop music business.

== The Beatles ==
Epstein first noticed the Beatles in issues of Mersey Beat and on numerous posters around Liverpool created by his commercial artist associate Tony Booth, before he asked Mersey Beat editor Bill Harry who they were. Harry had previously convinced Epstein to sell the magazine at NEMS, with the Beatles featured on the front page of its second issue. The Beatles had recorded the "My Bonnie" single with Tony Sheridan in Germany, and some months after its release Epstein asked his personal assistant Alistair Taylor about it. Epstein's version of the story was that customer Raymond Jones walked into the NEMS shop and asked him for the "My Bonnie" single, which made Epstein curious about the group.

Taylor later claimed that he had used the name of Jones (a regular customer) to order the single and paid the deposit, knowing that Epstein would notice it and order further copies. Harry and McCartney later repudiated Epstein's story, as Harry had been talking to Epstein for a long time about the Beatles—the group that he promoted the most in Mersey Beat—with McCartney saying, "Brian knew perfectly well who the Beatles were; they were on the front page of the second issue of Mersey Beat". On 3 August 1961, Epstein started a regular music column in Mersey Beat called "Stop the World—And Listen To Everything in It: Brian Epstein of NEMS".

The Beatles were due to perform a Thursday lunchtime concert at The Cavern Club on 9 November 1961. According to club owner Alan Sytner, Epstein had visited the club quite a few times previously on Saturday nights, once asking Sytner to book a group for his twenty-first birthday party. Epstein asked Harry to arrange for Epstein and his assistant Taylor to watch the Beatles perform. The club allowed Epstein and Taylor to enter without queuing. They bypassed the line of fans at the door and heard Bob Wooler, the resident disc jockey, announce a welcome message over the club's public address system: "We have someone rather famous in the audience today. Mr Brian Epstein, the owner of NEMS ..." Epstein later talked about the performance: "I was immediately struck by their music, their beat and their sense of humour on stage—and, even afterwards, when I met them, I was struck again by their personal charm. And it was there that, really, it all started."

After the performance, Epstein and Taylor went into the dressing room (which he later described as being "as big as a broom cupboard") to talk to the group. The Beatles, all regular NEMS customers, immediately recognised Epstein, but before he could congratulate them on their performance George Harrison said, "And what brings Mr Epstein here?" Epstein replied with, "We just popped in to say hello. I enjoyed your performance." He introduced Taylor, who merely nodded a greeting, said, "Well done, then, goodbye" and left. Epstein and Taylor then went for lunch, and during the meal Epstein asked Taylor what he thought about the group. Taylor replied that he honestly thought they were "absolutely awful", but there was something "remarkable" about them. Epstein sat there smiling for a long time before exclaiming, "I think they're tremendous!" Later, when Epstein was paying the bill, he grabbed Taylor's arm and said, "Do you think I should manage them?"

The Beatles played at The Cavern Club over the next three weeks, and Epstein was always there to watch them. He contacted Allan Williams (their previous promoter/manager) to confirm that Williams no longer had any ties to the group, but Williams advised Epstein "not to touch them with a fucking barge pole" because of a Hamburg concert percentage that the group had refused to pay.

=== Management contract ===
In an afternoon meeting with the group at NEMS on 3 December 1961, Epstein proposed the idea of managing the Beatles. John Lennon, George Harrison, and Pete Best arrived late for the meeting, as they had been drinking at a local pub. McCartney also did not arrive on time because he had just got up and was "taking a bath", as Harrison explained. Epstein was upset, but Harrison placated him by saying, "He may be late, but he'll be very clean." Lennon had invited Wooler to be at the meeting so that he could give his opinion of Epstein, but he introduced Wooler by saying, "This is me dad." Epstein was reticent throughout the short meeting, only asking if they had a manager. After learning that they had not, he said, "It seems to me that with everything going on, someone ought to be looking after you." He had further meetings with the group on 6 and 10 December 1961.

McCartney, Harrison, and Best were under 21 and therefore needed the consent of their parents to enter into a contract. Best and his mother—Mona Best, owner of the Casbah Coffee Club—were impressed with Epstein's professional image as were the other Beatles, because he was a businessman, wore expensive suits, and owned a large car. Best's mother said that Epstein "could be good for them [the Beatles]". McCartney's father was sceptical about a Jewish manager and warned his son to be careful about finances. Lennon's aunt and guardian, Mimi Smith, was against the idea, believing that Epstein would lose interest when something else attracted his attention, but Lennon, who had just turned 21, ignored his aunt's advice.

The Beatles signed a five-year contract with Epstein on 24 January 1962, giving Epstein 10 to 15 per cent of their income. They signed a new contract in October 1962 which gave Epstein 15, 20, or 25 per cent of revenues, depending on how much he helped the band earn. The Beatles would then share any income after various expenses had been deducted. Epstein then formed a management company, NEMS Enterprises, telling his parents that managing the group was only a part-time occupation and would not interfere with the family business.

The Beatles signed Epstein's first management contract, but Epstein did not. He later told Taylor, "Well, if they ever want to tear it up, they can hold me but I can't hold them". (English law would have enforced the contract through the doctrine of part performance.) The contract stated that Epstein would receive a management commission of 25 per cent of the group's gross income after a certain financial threshold had been reached. The Beatles argued for a smaller percentage, but Epstein pointed out that he had been paying their expenses for months without receiving anything in return. On 1 October 1962, four days before the release of "Love Me Do", Epstein signed Lennon and McCartney to a three-year NEMS publishing contract.

In 1963, Epstein advised the creation of Northern Songs, a publishing company that would control the copyrights of all Lennon–McCartney compositions recorded between 1963 and 1973. Music publisher Dick James and his partner Charles Silver owned 51 per cent of the company, Lennon and McCartney 20 per cent each, and Epstein 9 per cent. By 1969, Lennon and McCartney had lost control of all publishing rights to ATV Music Publishing.

=== The Beatles' appearance on stage ===
Epstein had no prior experience of artist management, yet he had a strong influence on the band's early dress code and stage demeanour. They had previously worn blue jeans and leather jackets, and they would stop and start songs when they felt like it or when an audience member requested a certain song. David Pomerran Szatmary states that when Epstein first saw them at the Cavern Club he thought, "They were a scruffy crowd in leather, and they were not very tidy and not very clean. They smoked as they played and they ate and talked and pretended to hit each other." Epstein encouraged them to wear suits and ties, insisted that they stop swearing, smoking, drinking, or eating on stage, and also suggested the famous synchronised bow at the end of their performances. McCartney was the first to agree with Epstein's suggestions, believing that they reflected Epstein's RADA training. Epstein explained that the process from leather jackets and jeans to suits took some time: "I encouraged them, at first, to get out of the leather jackets and jeans, and I wouldn't allow them to appear in jeans after a short time, and then, after that step, I got them to wear sweaters on stage, and then, very reluctantly, eventually, suits." Epstein took the group to Wirral to see his friend, master tailor Beno Dorn, who made them their first suits based on a design they had previously seen, which Epstein approved: "I thought it was an excellent design at the time."

Lennon resisted wearing suits and ties, but later said, "I'll wear a suit; I'll wear a bloody balloon if somebody's going to pay me." Epstein began seeking publicity by "charming and smarming [...] the newspaper people", as Lennon said in 1972. According to McCartney, "The gigs went up in stature and though the pay went up only a little bit, it did go up"; they were "now playing better places". The group was now far more organised, having one single diary in which to record bookings, rather than using whoever's diary was at hand. The group usually called Epstein "Mr. Epstein" or "Brian" in interviews, but in private the group abbreviated his name to "Eppy" or "Bri".

=== Record contract ===
The telegram that Epstein sent to Mersey Beat newspaper in Liverpool to announce that he had secured the Beatles their first recording contract

Starting shortly after he met the Beatles, Epstein made numerous trips to London to visit record companies in the hope of securing a record contract, but many rejected him, including Columbia, Pye, Philips, Oriole, and most notoriously Decca. On 13 December 1961, at Epstein's invitation, Mike Smith of Decca travelled from London to Liverpool to watch the group at the Cavern, which led to an audition in London on 1 January 1962 (see The Beatles' Decca audition). Decca informed Epstein one month later that the audition tapes had been rejected. The Beatles later found out that Epstein had paid Decca producer Tony Meehan (ex-drummer of the Shadows) to produce the studio recordings. While Epstein was negotiating with Decca he also approached Ron White, an EMI marketing executive with whom he had a business relationship. White told Epstein he would play the Beatles' recording of "My Bonnie" the band made in Germany with Tony Sheridan for EMI's four A&R directors. However, White only played it for two of them—Wally Ridley and Norman Newell.

In early February 1962, Epstein visited the HMV store (owned by EMI) in 363 Oxford Street, London to have the Decca tape transferred to 78 rpm acetates. Jim Foy, a disc-cutter for the His Master's Voice label, liked the recordings, suggesting that Epstein should contact Sid Colman, the head of EMI's record publishing division, which controlled the publishing company Ardmore & Beechwood. Colman and his colleague Kim Bennett liked the Beatles' recording of "Like Dreamers Do" and sought to have EMI record Lennon–McCartney original songs, with Ardmore & Beechwood retaining the publishing rights; they sent Epstein to George Martin, the A&R manager of EMI's Parlophone label. Epstein met Martin on 13 February, where he played the acetates of the Decca audition. Epstein left the meeting optimistic, but Martin "wasn't knocked out at all" by the "lousy tape".

Martin later claimed that Epstein's conviction that the Beatles would become internationally famous finally convinced him to offer a recording contract. In fact, however, EMI managing director L. G. ("Len") Wood instructed Martin to sign the Beatles in May 1962, largely to appease the continued interest of Ardmore & Beechwood in Lennon–McCartney song publishing. Martin met with Epstein again on 9 May and offered him a standard EMI recording contract for the Beatles to record six "sides" (equivalent to three two-sided single releases) in their first year. Upon signing the contract, Epstein immediately sent a telegram to the Beatles (who were in Hamburg) and to the Mersey Beat music journal in Liverpool.

The recording contract gave the Beatles one penny (1d) for each record sold, which was split among the four members, meaning that each earned one farthing per copy. The royalty rate was further reduced for singles sold outside the UK; the group received half of one penny per single, which was again split amongst the whole group. Martin scheduled the first recording session to be on 6 June 1962 at Abbey Road Studios. Epstein later renegotiated EMI's royalty rate and on 27 January 1967 the Beatles signed a new nine-year contract with EMI. The contract stipulated that 25 per cent would be paid to NEMS for the full nine years even if the Beatles decided not to renew their management contract with Epstein, which was up for renewal later that year.

=== Dismissal of Pete Best ===
By early 1962, the Beatles had played several gigs with Ringo Starr on occasions when Pete Best was ill, and he had performed at a recording session with Lennon, McCartney, and Harrison in Hamburg. The Beatles enjoyed Starr's drumming style and social demeanour with the band, whereas Best rarely socialized with the other band members after gigs. Lennon, McCartney, and Harrison had also long believed Best to be a stylistically limited drummer. McCartney later remarked, "It had got to the stage that Pete was holding us back. What were we gonna do—pretend he was a wonderful drummer?"

After the group's first recording session on 6 June 1962, George Martin felt that using an experienced studio session drummer rather than Best would improve the recording (this was in accordance with normal practice at the time). Lennon, McCartney, and Harrison decided Best needed to be replaced and, uncomfortable with sacking him themselves, asked Epstein to sack Best so that Starr could join the band. Epstein was aware the Beatles had discussed replacing Best but hoped it would not happen, as he was not yet fond of Starr. Epstein agonised about the decision, asking the Cavern's disc jockey Bob Wooler if it was a good idea. Wooler replied that Best was "very popular with the fans", who would not like it at all. Despite his reservations, Epstein accepted the Beatles' decision: "They liked Ringo, and I trusted the boys' judgment. If they were happy, so was I."

Epstein's task of sacking Best was complicated by the fact that he was under contract to provide management to all four members of the Beatles. Epstein thus had to secure paid work for Best if he was to leave the group. Epstein consulted a lawyer, who informed him that the Beatles could not simply expel Best under the terms of their contract; they could only legally disband and then re-form with Starr. Epstein planned to have Best become the drummer for the Merseybeats as an alternative that would satisfy his commitment to provide Best work.

In the meantime, Starr was playing with Rory Storm and the Hurricanes, the resident group at Butlins' holiday complex in Skegness. Epstein searched for drummers who could temporarily fill in for Best until Starr was available to join the Beatles, such as Joe Brown's drummer, Bobby Graham. He also offered the position to Johnny Hutchinson of the Big Three, a group that Epstein managed at that time as well. Hutchinson turned down the offer, saying, "Pete Best is a very good friend of mine. I couldn't do the dirty on him"—although Hutchinson did play for the Beatles at short notice when Best did not turn up on the evening of his dismissal and for two subsequent bookings, until Starr was able to join.

Epstein finally dismissed Best on 16 August, more than two months after the first recording session at EMI Studios. He called Best and Neil Aspinall to his office on Whitechapel Street, where he informed Best that the Beatles would be replacing him with Starr. When Best asked why, Epstein told him, "Mainly because they think you're not a good enough drummer. And also because at EMI Studios, George Martin said, 'the drummer isn't good enough'."

With the band's lineup now solidified, Epstein had his solicitor draw up a new management contract for the Beatles.

=== Beatles' last official live appearance in the UK ===
The Beatles made their last official live appearance in Britain on 1 May 1966, at the NME Annual Poll-Winners' All-Star Concert at the Empire Pool, Wembley Park. Although the concert was televised, the cameras were switched off while the Beatles played, because Epstein and ABC TV had failed to agree over terms. They were filmed receiving their awards, however.

=== After Candlestick Park ===
The Beatles' hectic schedule kept Epstein very busy between 1963 and 1965 with touring plus television and film work. Their last live concert was at Candlestick Park in San Francisco on 29 August 1966, and Epstein's management duties then changed to reflect the changing nature of their career. He pressured them to continue touring, but they steadfastly refused.

== Business dealings ==
Epstein once offered all four Beatles a fixed wage of £50 a week for life (equivalent to £1,000 in 2025). Harrison remembered that he was earning £25 a week at the time (equivalent to £500 in 2025), which was more than the £10 a week that his father was earning (equivalent to £200 in 2025). The group declined Epstein's offer, believing that they were worth much more than £50 a week.

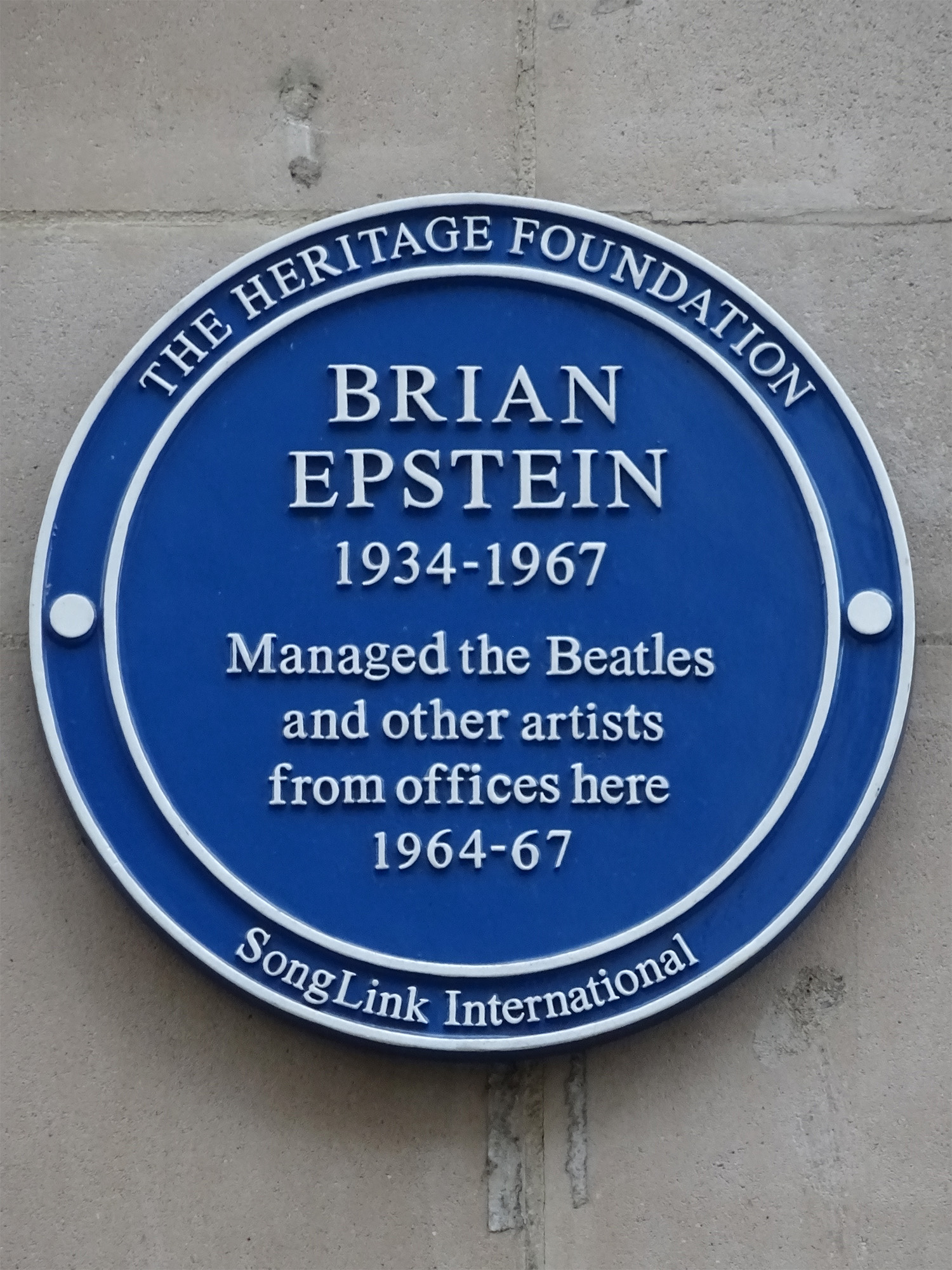
Commemorative plaque in Argyll Street, Soho, London

NEMS had a staff of twenty-five at the time of its move from Liverpool to London in 1964. NEMS booked the Beatles' concerts, and it also presented groups as an opening act. It accrued money as promoter, booking agent, and manager for all concerts. The Beatles were constantly in demand by concert promoters, and Epstein took advantage of the situation to avoid paying some taxes by accepting "hidden" fees on the night of a performance, which he always kept in a brown paper bag.

Epstein also successfully managed Gerry and the Pacemakers, Billy J. Kramer and the Dakotas (who had four hits with Lennon–McCartney songs), the Fourmost (Lennon wrote their first two singles), the Cyrkle (Epstein's first American group), and Cilla Black (who was Epstein's only female artist), as well as Tommy Quickly and Sounds Incorporated (later known as Sounds Inc.). He also managed the Moody Blues for around a year from late 1965 to late 1966. Epstein sent his roster of artists on "package tours" around the UK, a common practice at the time. This involved short sets by each act, alternating with a compère or a comedian. Epstein once revealed that even though he was entitled to be reimbursed by acts for expenses incurred, he paid for his own flights to and from the United States, as he did not see himself as being part of a touring group. Photographs, transport, and international telephone calls were paid from his own 25 percent share in profits.

The Beatles toured the Philippines in July 1966, playing two shows at the Rizal Memorial Football Stadium in Manila. Epstein unintentionally snubbed the nation's first lady Imelda Marcos when presented with an invitation to a breakfast party. He had politely declined on behalf of the group, as it was their policy never to accept such official invitations. The Beatles and their entourage were ejected from their hotel on the same day and given a police escort to the airport, even though Epstein had publicly apologised for the misunderstanding in a televised statement, which was not seen or heard because of static. The entourage boarded the plane for home, but Epstein and Beatles' assistant Mal Evans were ordered off, both believing that they would not be allowed back on the plane. Epstein was forced to give the tax authorities £6,800 worth of Philippine peso notes earned from the Manila shows and to sign a tax bond verifying the exchange before being allowed back on the plane with Evans.

Epstein added the Vic Lewis Organisation to NEMS in 1966, and later brought impresario Robert Stigwood in as a manager. He once offered to sell the control of NEMS to Stigwood, without telling any of his artists about the offer. McCartney was taking a more active interest in NEMS' finances, as it became known that some artists with more ruthless managers claimed to be benefiting from more commercially advantageous terms, such as the Rolling Stones under the management of Allen Klein. After Epstein's death, Clive Epstein assumed control of NEMS as the company's second-largest shareholder. Stigwood then tried to take over management of NEMS but all four Beatles vigorously objected, with Lennon saying, "We don't know you. Why would we do this?"

McCartney admitted that they had always signed all the contracts that Epstein presented to them without reading them first, but after Epstein's death Lennon complained, "Well, he was alright. I've found out since, of course, that he wasn't quite as honest to us as he made out." Despite this, other interviews with Lennon report him as being loyal to Epstein's memory: "We had complete faith in him when he was running us. To us, he was the expert." When asked in 1964 about his standing as a manager or businessman, Epstein replied, "Fair, as a businessman, fair. I've got a business background, and probably a reasonable business brain. I'm no, sort of, genius [laughter]." Asked about his deficiencies, Epstein replied, "I'm probably too conscious of ideas, rather than finance behind ideas."

According to Time, Epstein made $14 million in five years while managing The Beatles.

=== Merchandising ===
Before the Beatles achieved nationwide success in Britain, Epstein had permitted a company (run by his cousins and initially catering to fan club members), to produce Beatles sweaters for 30 shillings (£1.50) and badges for 6 pence (6d) (2½p). It sold 15,000 sweaters and 50,000 badges as the group's popularity grew. When Beatlemania swept the UK in November 1963, Epstein was besieged by novelty-goods companies desperate to use the Beatles name on plastic guitars, drums, disc racks, badges, belts and other merchandise. Epstein refused to allow the Beatles to endorse any product directly, but through NEMS Enterprises he granted discretionary licences to companies who were able to produce good-quality products at a fair price, even though many companies were already selling products without a licence.

During the first Beatles trip to the United States, merchandisers pitched many products to Epstein, including Beatles clocks, pens, cigarette lighters, plastic wigs, bracelets, games, etc., but he rejected them all. This was because he had already allowed David Jacobs, the lawyer for NEMS, to give away 90 per cent of merchandising rights to Nicky Byrne in the UK. This was later deemed to be a disastrous mistake, as it left only 10 per cent for Epstein, NEMS and the Beatles, but David Jacobs subsequently renegotiated the royalty rate to 49% at Epstein's behest in August 1964. Byrne then took over Epstein's Stramsact merchandising in the UK and set up Seltaeb (Beatles spelled backwards) in the United States. While the Beatles were ensconced in the Plaza Hotel in New York City, Epstein was further besieged by calls and visits from promoters, retailers, television commentators and hustlers.

Mindful of the number of records the group was selling in the United States, Capitol Records sent a well-spoken Yorkshire woman, Wendy Hanson, to the Plaza Hotel to act as Epstein's secretary and to filter his calls. Hanson later worked solely with Epstein in his Albemarle Street office in London, which was separate from the NEMS office. Lennon later said, "On the business end he [Epstein] ripped us off on the Seltaeb thing." McCartney said years later, "He [Epstein] looked to his dad for business advice, and his dad knew how to run a furniture store in Liverpool."

=== Lenmac ===
Epstein asked chartered accountant James Trevor Isherwood to set up a company to collect Lennon and McCartney's PRS payment, called Lenmac, which he did on 12 May 1964. When he first visited Epstein's office, Isherwood was surprised to learn that Epstein took 25 per cent of the gross income, and not the 10 per cent that he believed most other managers received at that time. All of Epstein's expenses were deducted from his artists' gross income, including office rental, staff wages, travel, telephone costs, and entertaining expenses. Before his death, Epstein knew that the renegotiation of his management contract (up for renewal on 30 September 1967) would lower his management fee from 25 to 10 per cent, and that NEMS would no longer receive a share of the Beatles' performance fees, reducing its revenues still further.

=== Publishing ===
The Beatles entered into a publishing agreement with Dick James Music (DJM), so James set up a company called Northern Songs. James and his financial partner and accountant, Charles Silver, would each receive 25 per cent of the shares. Lennon and McCartney received 20 per cent each, with Epstein receiving the remaining 10 per cent. The Beatles' PRS income increased rapidly, so Epstein asked Isherwood to devise a way of avoiding the tax that Lennon and McCartney would owe. Isherwood suggested a stock market flotation for Northern Songs. He also suggested to Epstein that during the flotation Lennon and McCartney should move to houses near Isherwood's own in Esher. Lennon, Harrison and Starr agreed, while Epstein and McCartney remained in London.

=== Promoter and presenter ===
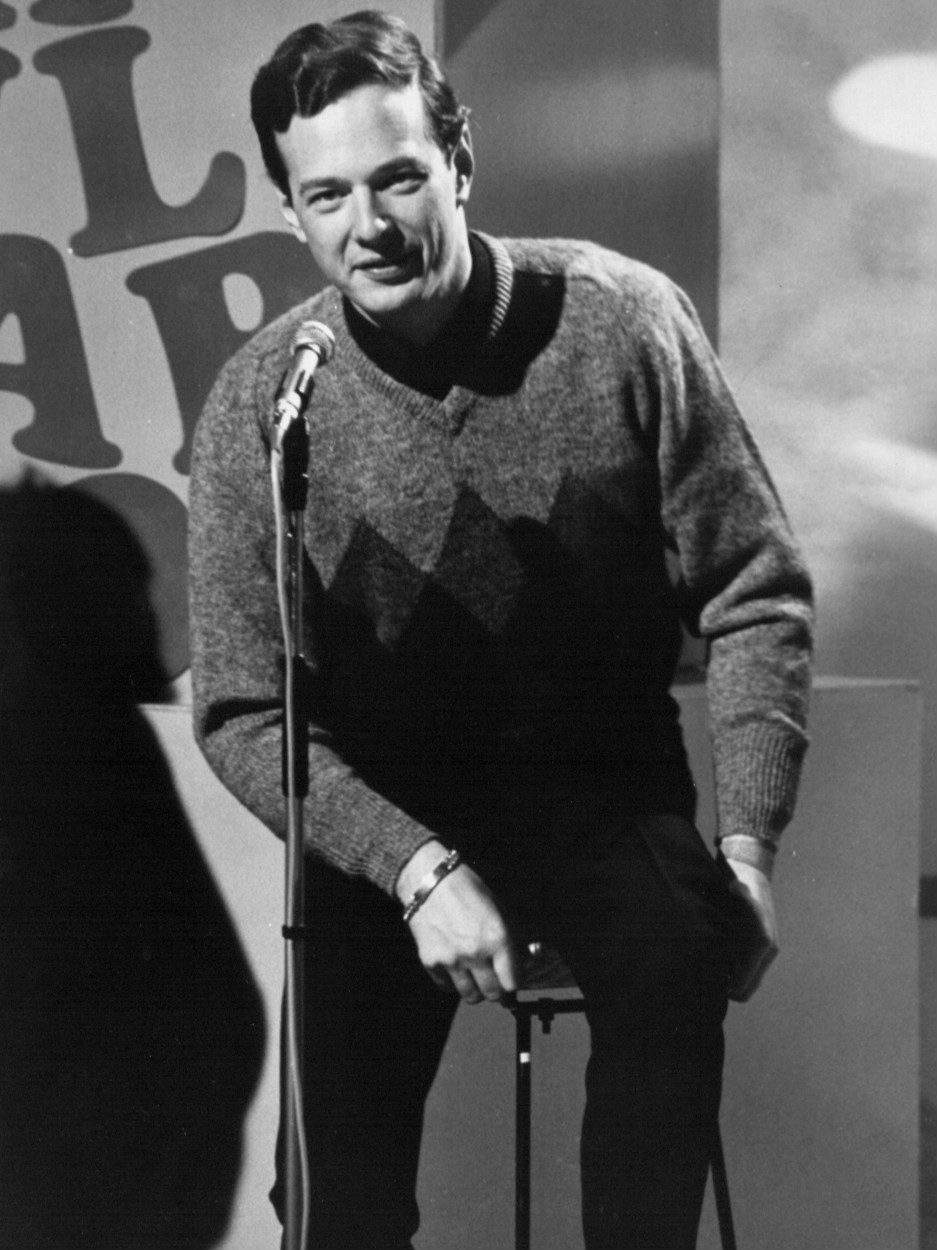
Epstein hosting the teen music programme Hullabaloo, 8 January 1965

After settling in London in 1965, Epstein rented an office in Monmouth Street, and later bought the lease of the Saville Theatre on Shaftesbury Avenue. He promoted new works by writers such as Arnold Wesker in productions that occasionally fell foul of the Lord Chamberlain for including "obscene" content or nudity. In 1966 Epstein reinvented it as a music venue featuring various US acts. On 20 February 1967 Epstein sacked the manager of the theatre, Michael Bullock, for lowering the safety curtain the previous day shortly before the end of a Chuck Berry concert that Epstein was attending with Lennon and Starr. Two fans had climbed onto the stage to dance, the curtain came down, and they were pushed from the stage. Although Bullock had not given the order, he was held responsible.

In the wake of the Beatles' success Epstein was asked to appear on several music-based TV programmes in Britain. He also hosted a regular part of the US television show Hullabaloo, filming his appearances in the UK.

== Personal life ==
Throughout Epstein's life, he was known to be kind and caring to his family, friends of his family, and business colleagues. When Lennon married Cynthia Powell, on 23 August 1962, Epstein served as best man and paid for the couple's celebratory lunch afterwards. During Cynthia's pregnancy Epstein paid for a private room in a hospital and offered the Lennons the sole use of his flat at 36 Falkner Street, Liverpool, when they needed a home. He also agreed to be godfather to Lennon's son Julian.

=== Sexual orientation ===
Epstein's homosexuality was not publicly known until some years after his death, although it had been an open secret among his friends and business associates. While Epstein was in the British Army, he commissioned a tailor to make him an officer's uniform. He wore the uniform when cruising the bars of London, but was arrested one night at the Army and Navy Club in Piccadilly by the military police for impersonating an officer. Epstein managed to avoid a court martial by agreeing to see an army psychiatrist, who learned of Epstein's sexuality. After ten months he was discharged from the army on medical grounds for being "emotionally and mentally unfit". Epstein later stated that his first homosexual experience was when he returned to Liverpool after being discharged.

Epstein spent a year studying acting at RADA, but dropped out shortly after his arrest for "persistent importuning" outside a men's public toilet in Swiss Cottage, London. Cottaging, as it was called, was one of the few public ways that gay and bisexual men could meet, especially if they were closeted. When Epstein first saw the Beatles perform he noticed their stage attire first, saying, "They were rather scruffily dressed, in the nicest possible way, or I should say in the most attractive way—black leather jackets, jeans, long hair of course". McCartney said that when Epstein started to manage the Beatles they knew that he was homosexual but did not care, because he encouraged them professionally and offered them access to previously "off-limits" social circles.

Although the group, Lennon in particular, often made sarcastic comments about Epstein's homosexuality to friends and to Epstein personally, no one outside the group's inner circle was allowed to comment. One of Lennon's art-school friends, Ian Sharp (better known as actor Richard Tate), once made a sarcastic remark about Epstein, saying, "Which one of you [Beatles] does he fancy?" Sharp was sent a letter by Epstein's office within 48 hours that demanded a complete apology. Sharp apologised but was then ostracised. McCartney sent Sharp a letter directing him to have no contact with any of them in the future. Epstein went on holiday to places such as Amsterdam, Torremolinos and Barcelona or Manchester at weekends, as the attitude towards homosexuals there was more tolerant than in Liverpool, even though Liverpool did have several gay bars.

In his autobiography, Pete Best stated that Epstein drove them both to Blackpool one evening where Epstein expressed his "very fond admiration". Epstein then supposedly said, "Would you find it embarrassing if I ask you to stay in a hotel overnight?" Best replied that he was not interested and the two never mentioned the incident again. There were reports of a brief sexual encounter between Lennon and Epstein during a four-day holiday in Barcelona in April 1963. Lennon admitted in a 1971 Rolling Stone interview that he knew Epstein was a "fag" and that he (Lennon) enjoyed "playing a bit faggy and all that". Addressing the rumours again later, Lennon told Playboy in 1980, "Well, it was almost a love affair, but not quite. It was never consummated ... but we did have a pretty intense relationship". A fictionalised account of the Spanish holiday is featured in the 1992 film The Hours and Times.

=== Drug use ===
After the start of his management career, Epstein started taking stimulants, usually Preludin, which did not require a prescription at the time. Lennon, McCartney, Harrison, and Starr had also taken it since their days in Hamburg. Epstein explained his use of the drug as the only means of staying awake at night during numerous concert tours. In 1964, Peter Brown suspected that Epstein was taking too many pills, as he would often cough at parties, which Brown realised was Epstein's way of secretly putting pills into his mouth without anyone noticing. McCartney often met Epstein at late night clubs in London, and remembered that Epstein would often grind his jaws (possibly due to bruxism), once saying to him, "Ugghhh, the pills". Epstein also developed dependencies on the drug carbromal, a barbiturate-like sedative/hypnotic drug.

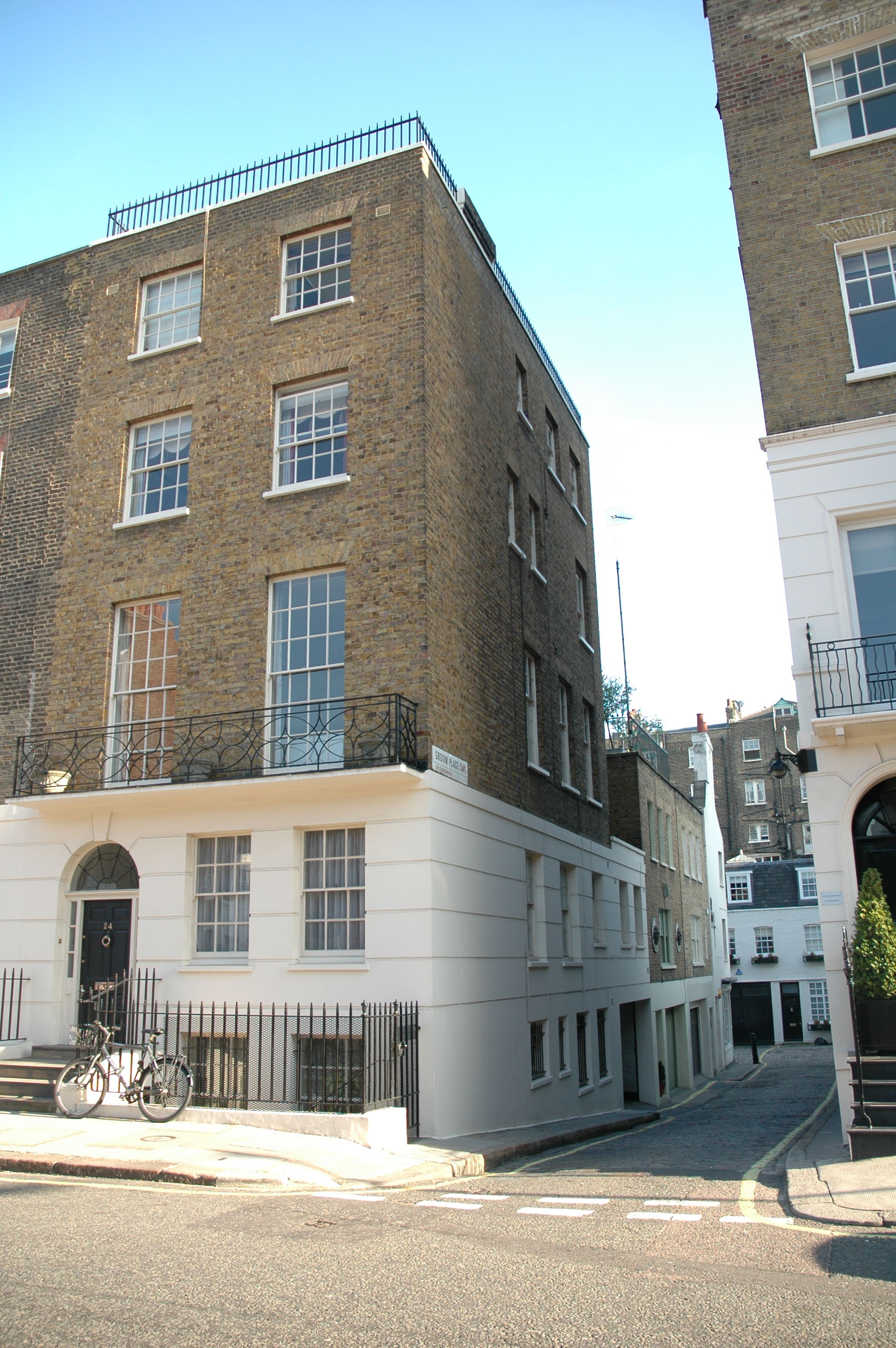
24 Chapel Street, London, where Epstein lived, and later died

In 1964, after having been introduced to cannabis by Bob Dylan in New York, Epstein was observed by McCartney standing in front of a mirror, pointing at himself and repeatedly saying "Jew!", while laughing loudly, which McCartney found hilarious and "very liberating". Epstein later became heavily involved in the 1960s drug scene. During the four months when the Beatles' album Sgt. Pepper was being recorded, Epstein spent time on holiday, or at the Priory Clinic in Putney, where he tried unsuccessfully to curb his drug use. He left the Priory to attend the Sgt. Pepper launch party at his house on 24 Chapel Street, but returned to the Priory immediately after.

Epstein added his name to an advertisement that appeared in The Times on 24 July 1967, which called for the legalisation of cannabis, the release of all prisoners imprisoned because of possession, and research into marijuana's medical uses. The advertisement was sponsored by a group called Soma and was signed by 65 people, including the Beatles, Scottish psychiatrist R. D. Laing, sixteen doctors, and two members of Parliament. Epstein responded to questions about the advertisement by saying, "My opinion is that pot smoking is definitely less harmful than drinking alcohol. I am not addicted to either, but I have been very drunk and very 'high'." In June 1967, after McCartney had admitted to LSD use, Epstein defended him to the media, stating that he too had taken the drug.

=== Gambling ===
In August 1965, the Beatles and Epstein visited Elvis Presley at his house in Los Angeles, where Elvis's manager, Colonel Tom Parker, set up a roulette wheel and several packs of playing cards. Epstein immediately asked to play, as he was known for his love of gambling. McCartney frequently visited gambling clubs in London, such as Epstein's favourite casino, Curzon House Club, where he often ran into Epstein. He once saw Epstein put a Dunhill cigarette lighter worth £100 (equivalent to £1,700 in 2025) on the table, then lose it during a game of cards. Epstein often lost thousands of pounds by playing baccarat or chemin-de-fer (the original version of baccarat when it was introduced in France), but would stay at Curzon House the whole evening, eating an expensive meal and drinking fine wines. The club never presented him with a bill, as they knew he lost so much in the casino.

== Death ==
The Daily Mirror Headline: "EPSTEIN (The Beatle-Making Prince of Pop) DIES AT 32"

After his father died in July 1967, Epstein sat shiva, the traditional week of mourning, in Liverpool, having just come out of the Priory Clinic where he had been trying to cure his acute insomnia and amphetamine addiction. On 23 August 1967, four days before his death, Epstein made his last visit to a Beatles recording session at the Chappell Recording Studios on Maddox Street in Mayfair, London, where they were recording Magical Mystery Tour.

On 24 August, Epstein asked personal assistant Peter Brown and business partner Geoffrey Ellis down to Kingsley Hill, his country home in Warbleton, East Sussex, for the bank holiday weekend, approximately 50 miles (80 km) from his home in Chapel Street. After they arrived, Epstein decided to drive back to London alone because an expected group of friends he had invited failed to arrive, although they did turn up after Epstein left.

At 5 p.m. the next day, on 25 August, Epstein phoned Brown at Kingsley Hill from his Chapel Street house in London. Brown thought that Epstein sounded "very groggy" and suggested that he take a train down to Uckfield, the nearest railway station to Kingsley Hall, instead of driving under the influence of Tuinal. Epstein replied that he would eat something, read his mail, and watch Juke Box Jury, then would phone Brown to tell him which train to meet. He never called again.

On 27 August 1967, Epstein's butler attempted to rouse Epstein through his locked bedroom door. The butler then called Epstein's physician assistant, Joanne Petersen, who also failed to rouse him through the locked door. Petersen then called Epstein's doctor, who, with the butler, broke down the door and found Epstein in his bed, eyes closed as though asleep, an open book near his hand, and some digestive biscuits on the bedside cabinet. When they realised that Epstein was unconscious, staff swept the house for contraband, then called the police and he was pronounced dead. Epstein was found on a single bed, dressed in pyjamas, with various correspondence spread over a second single bed.

The coroner, Gavin Thurston, told the statutory inquest that Epstein's death was caused by an overdose of Carbrital, a hypnotic preparation combining the barbiturate pentobarbital with carbromal, combined with alcohol in his system and ruled it as an accidental death. The pathologist, Donald Teare, stated that Epstein had been taking bromide in the form of Carbrital for some time and that the barbiturate level in Epstein's blood was a "low fatal level". It was revealed that Epstein had taken six Carbrital pills to sleep, which was probably normal for him but in combination with alcohol, his tolerance was reduced.

At the time of Epstein's death, the Beatles were on a retreat with the Indian guru Maharishi Mahesh Yogi in Bangor in North Wales. Epstein had agreed to travel to Bangor after the August bank holiday. The second of two shows by Jimi Hendrix at Epstein's Saville Theatre was cancelled on the evening of Epstein's death.

Brown alleged in his memoir that he had found a suicide note written by Epstein, which read in part, "This is all too much and I can't take it any more". Brown had also found a will in which Epstein left his house and money to his mother and his brother, with Brown named as a minor beneficiary. When confronted with the notes, Epstein told Brown that he would be grateful if Brown did not tell anyone, and that he was sorry he had made Brown worry. Epstein explained that when he wrote the note and composed the will, he had simply taken one pill too many and that he had no intention of overdosing, promising to be more careful in the future. Brown later wrote that he wondered if he had done the right thing by not showing the note to Epstein's doctor, Norman Cowan, who would have stopped prescribing drugs.

Epstein was buried in the Long Lane Jewish Cemetery in Aintree, Liverpool. The graveside service was held by Rabbi Norman Solomon, who said, disparagingly, that Epstein was "a symbol of the malaise of our generation".

The Beatles did not attend Epstein's funeral, both to allow his family some privacy and to avoid attracting fans and the media. According to Ellis, on the day before the funeral, George Harrison had given Nat Weiss, Epstein's good friend and confidant, a single chrysanthemum wrapped in a newspaper on behalf of all four Beatles, with instructions to place the flower on Brian's coffin as a final farewell. Weiss and Ellis, knowing that flowers are forbidden at Jewish funerals in some traditions, discussed this dilemma while walking to the grave, where they observed two men beginning to shovel dirt onto the casket. Ellis later wrote: "Nat, who himself was Jewish, cast the newspaper package unopened onto Brian's coffin, where it was swiftly covered by earth".

A few weeks later, on 17 October, all four Beatles attended a memorial service for Epstein at the New London Synagogue in St John's Wood (near Abbey Road Studios), which was officiated by Rabbi Louis Jacobs.

== Legacy ==
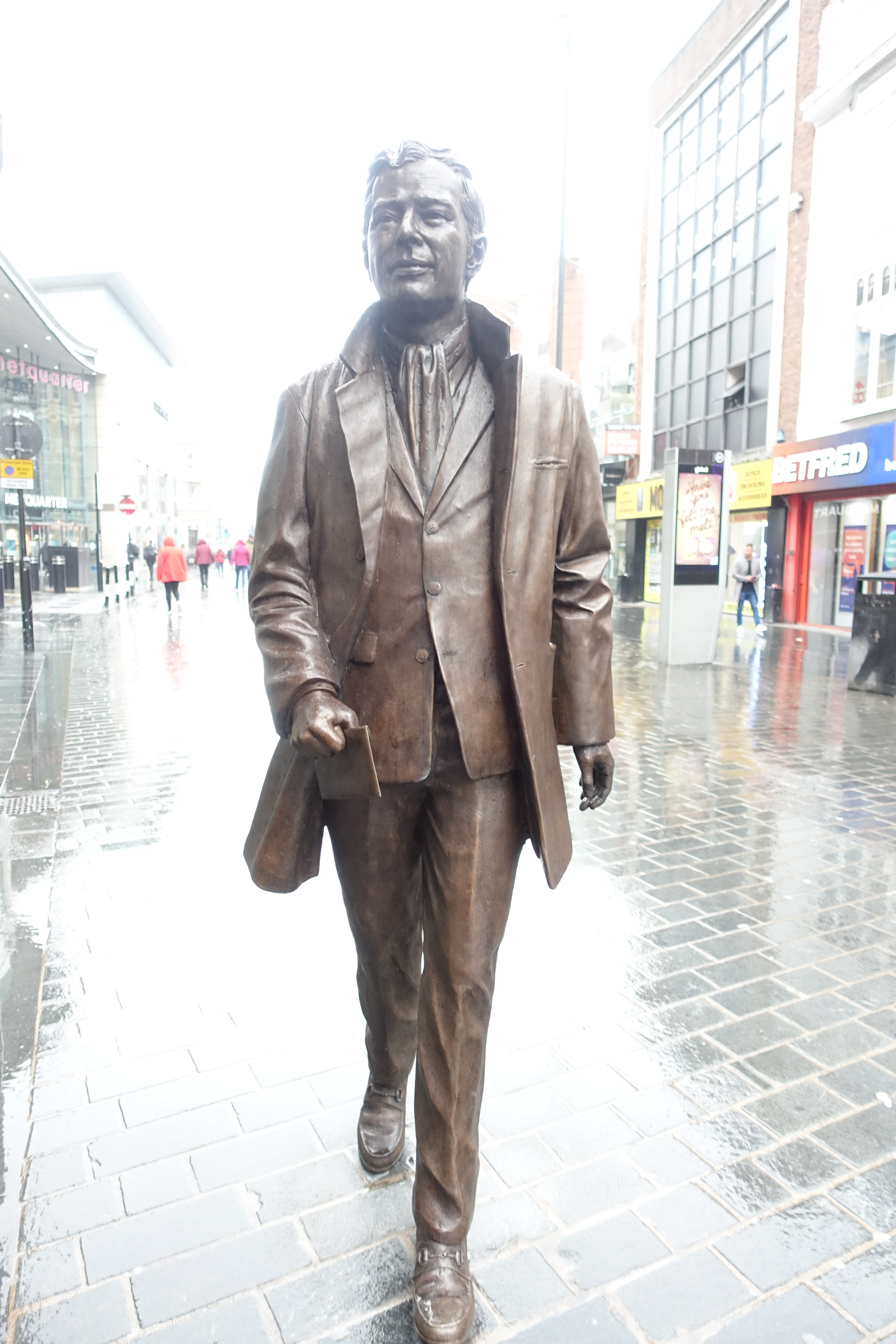
The statue of Brian Epstein in Whitechapel, Liverpool

Epstein was upset that he was not honoured along with Lennon, McCartney, Harrison, and Starr when they received the MBE in 1965, though Harrison once said that the MBE stood for "Mister Brian Epstein". The Beatles were among the earliest entrants into the Rock and Roll Hall of Fame, but Epstein was not included in the Hall's "Non-Performers' Section" until 2014, and not without controversy as he was inducted alongside Rolling Stones manager Andrew Loog Oldham who refused to attend, in part in protest at what he perceived as the indignity of a joint induction. Martin Lewis, previously Taylor's assistant, created the official Brian Epstein website, which included a petition that Epstein be inducted into the Hall of Fame. Lewis also organised the 1998 re-publication, in the United States, of Epstein's 1964 autobiography A Cellarful of Noise.

McCartney summarised the importance of Epstein when he was interviewed in 1997 for a BBC documentary about Epstein, saying: "If anyone was the Fifth Beatle, it was Brian." In his 1970 Rolling Stone interview, Lennon commented that Epstein's death marked the beginning of the end for the group: "I knew that we were in trouble then [...] I thought, 'We've fucking had it now.'" In 2006, Cynthia Lennon said: "I think Brian's one of the forgotten people. It's almost as if he's been written out of the [Beatles] story. I don't think they'd have got anywhere without Brian." The first contract between the Beatles and Epstein was auctioned in London in 2008, fetching £240,000.

Epstein's influence on the Beatles and his complicated personal life continue to provoke controversy. In 2013, author Vivek Tiwary released the graphic novel The Fifth Beatle: The Brian Epstein Story. A film of the same name was scheduled for release in 2014, originally to be produced by Bruce Cohen and directed by Peyton Reed. Tiwary said about that project that the film would "be less a music bio and more of an inspirational human-interest story about an outsider". Tiwary and named co-producers Stuart Ford and Simon Cowell originally set the film for release in 2016, but in March 2016 it was announced that the project would be a television series.

Another biopic about Epstein, Midas Man, premiered at the 32nd Toronto Jewish Film Festival on 30 May 2024.

As well as Jacob Fortune-Lloyd in Midas Man, Epstein has been portrayed by other actors such as Ed Stoppard in Cilla, and Andrew Games in The Moondogs from 2022 to 2024.

Epstein was once asked about the future of the Beatles and their "fresh honesty" (as he put it), which the interviewer thought could be "corrupted by time." He replied by saying, "I think they will go in the reverse direction, and become more honest."

On 27 August 2022, the 55th anniversary of his death, a bronze statue of Epstein was unveiled near the site of NEMS. One of the statue's sculptors, Jane Robbins, is a cousin of McCartney.

Please Please Me, a play by Tom Wright depicting Epstein's life, was staged at the Kiln Theatre in April 2026. The production starred Calam Lynch in the role of Epstein.

A biography by Philip Norman, Mr. Moonlight: Brian Epstein and the Making of the Beatles, was published in 2026.

== See also ==
- Outline of the Beatles
- The Beatles timeline
