= Laura Greene =

Laura Greene may refer to:

- Laura Greene (presenter) (born 1972), British weather presenter and television presenter
- Laura Greene (physicist), physics professor at Florida State University

== See also ==
- Laura Green, British epidemiologist and academic
