= Beno =

Beno is a name of various origins. In the Bible it appears in 1 Chronicles 24:26–27 where the Hebrew word בנו is rendered as "Beno" in some English translations and as "his son" in others. Beno is also a short form of Benedict in various languages. It is also a place name in multiple languages.

== People ==
=== Given name ===
- Beno of Santi Martino e Silvestro (fl. 1082–98), Roman Catholic cardinal
- Beno Axionov (born 1946), Russian-Moldovan actor, director, drama teacher and screenwriter
- Beno Blachut (1913–1985), Czech operatic tenor
- Beno Bryant (born 1971), American football player
- Beno Dorn, Polish-English master tailor
- Beno Eckmann (1917–2008), Swiss mathematician
- Beno Gutenberg (1889–1960), German-American seismologist
- Benő Káposzta (1942–2025), Hungarian footballer
- Beno Lapajne (born 1973), Slovenian handball player
- Beno Obano (born 1994), English rugby union player
- Beno Udrih (born 1982), Slovenian basketball player
- Beno Zephine N L (born 1990), Indian Foreign Service officer
- Beno Zupančič (1925–1980), Slovene writer and journalist

=== Surname ===
- John Beno (1931–2000), Colorado state senator and Roman Catholic priest

== Places ==
- Beno Airport, serving Beno, Democratic Republic of the Congo

== See also ==
- David Benveniste, nickname "Beno" (born 1970), American entrepreneur
