= Ghostwatch =

1992 British pseudo-documentary horror film directed by Lesley Manning

- The BFI DVD release cover
- Genre: Supernatural horror; pseudo-documentary
- Created by: Stephen Volk
- Written by: Stephen Volk
- Directed by: Lesley Manning
- Starring: Michael Parkinson; Sarah Greene; Mike Smith; Craig Charles; Gillian Bevan; Keith Ferrari
- Theme music composer: Philip Appleby
- Country of origin: United Kingdom
- Original language: English

Production
- Executive producer: Richard Broke
- Producers: Ruth Baumgarten; Derek Nelson
- Editor: Chris Swanton
- Running time: 91 minutes
- Production company: BBC

Original release
- Network: BBC1
- Release: 31 October 1992

Ghostwatch is a British supernatural horror pseudo-documentary television film, first broadcast on BBC1 on Halloween night, 1992. Written by Stephen Volk, and directed by Lesley Manning, the drama was produced for the BBC anthology series Screen One by Richard Broke, Ruth Baumgarten and Derek Nelson. Although filmed several months in advance, the narrative was presented as live television. During and following its first and only UK television broadcast, the programme attracted considerable controversy, with the BBC receiving around 30,000 calls from distressed and angry viewers.

Ghostwatch has never been repeated on UK television. It has been repeated internationally, on stations such as the Canadian digital channel Scream for Halloween 2004, and the Belgian channel Canvas in 2008. It became available on the American streaming video service Shudder in 2017, and it was made available on the Internet Archive the same year. There have been three UK home video releases. In 2002, the British Film Institute released a 10th Anniversary edition on VHS and DVD, and 101 Films issued a DVD release in 2011 and a 30th Anniversary Blu-ray release in 2022. In 2016, the BBC Store made the film available as part of the Frightmares collection, marking Halloween.

A retrospective documentary, Ghostwatch: Behind the Curtains, based on the film's lasting impact, was released on DVD in 2013 (having been in production between 2007 and 2012), featuring interviews with many of the original cast and crew. It, too, was made available as part of the BBC Store Frightmares collection, and shortly after release, the BFI Mediatheque.

== Synopsis ==
Ghostwatch is presented as a live broadcast, hosted by Michael Parkinson, in an attempt to present concrete evidence of paranormal phenomena. To achieve this, the programme launches an on-air investigation into a house in the fictional Foxhill Drive, Northolt, Greater London. Pamela Early (Brid Brennan) and her daughters Suzanne (Michelle Wesson) and Kim (Cherise Wesson) are tormented by a poltergeist referred to by Kim as "Pipes", his name originating from knocking noises which Pamela first attributed to the house's plumbing. Pipes routinely possesses and harms Suzanne, and is said to dwell in a room under the house's stairs.

Parkinson is supported by fellow hosts Sarah Greene, who ventures into the house to spend the night with the Earlys, her husband Mike Smith, who oversees staged phone calls from the public who wish to share their own ghost stories, and comedian Craig Charles, who interviews the locals regarding the street's violent history. Greene is accompanied by her camera crew, Chris Miller and Mike Aiton, who are actual BBC technicians. Parkinson is joined in the studio by Dr. Lin Pascoe (Gillian Bevan), a parapsychologist studying the phenomena.

At first, the broadcast seems harmless, but supernatural phenomena begin to occur in the house. Suzanne is exposed falsifying the knocking sounds, convincing Parkinson that the whole affair is a hoax. Suzanne then speaks in an unearthly guttural voice and develops scratches across her face. The public share their ghost stories, numerous callers mention they have seen Pipes lurking in the house on the broadcast footage, and others say paranormal incidents are happening in their own homes.

Pipes' background is slowly pieced together. An interviewed neighbor mentions Mother Seddons, a Victorian baby farmer who murdered children, re-imagined as a bogeyman by the locals. Later, an anonymous call from a probation officer reveals that Raymond Tunstall, a disturbed paedophile who believed he was possessed by Seddons, hanged himself in the room under the stairs, where his body was eaten by his relatives' cats. Pascoe suggests there may be a greater force at play, a possibly ancient evil that possessed Mother Seddons, Tunstall, and countless others.

As events in the house grow increasingly frightening, Suzanne disappears and is heard from behind the locked door under the stairs. The camera crew forces the door open, only for a mirror to fall and wound Aiton. Abruptly, the footage shows the house has returned to normal. However, Pascoe realises the footage is from earlier in the broadcast, and that Pipes has used the free will to create a nationwide séance circle, invading the public's homes.

The live broadcast resumes as Pamela, Kim, and the injured Aiton are evacuated from the house. Inside, Greene and Miller attempt to rescue Suzanne, but Greene is dragged through the under-stairs door, which slams shut. The programme ends as inexplicable paranormal activity starts happening in the TV studio, causing all on-set save Parkinson to flee. Parkinson wanders about in the darkened studio, beginning to show signs that he has been possessed by Pipes.

== Background ==
The story is based on the tale of the Enfield Poltergeist. The presentation contained realistic elements which suggested to a casual viewer that it was an actual documentary. The studio scenes were recorded in Studio D, BBC Elstree Studios, Clarendon Road. The scenes at the house and the street were all shot on location around 5–6 weeks before the recording of the studio scenes. The recorded scenes in the house and street were then played into the studio, where Michael Parkinson, Mike Smith, and the fictional Dr Pascoe had to interact with them.

A phone number was shown on the screen so that viewers could "call in" and discuss ghostly phenomena. The number was the standard BBC call-in number at the time, 081 811 8181 (also used on programmes such as Going Live!), and callers who got through were connected first to a message telling them that the show was fictional, before being given the chance to share their own ghost stories, probably as a way of writing future stories for Ghostwatch. However, the phone number was besieged by countless callers during the showing and many people who telephoned simply got an engaged tone, partially because there were only five telephone operators available. This commonly happened when phoning BBC "call in" shows and inadvertently added to the realism instead of reassuring viewers that it was fiction.

Ghostwatch was originally conceived by writer Stephen Volk as a six-part drama (similar to Edge of Darkness) in which a fictional paranormal investigator and a TV reporter investigate poltergeist activity at a North London housing estate, gradually discovering more elements of the mystery each week. This would have culminated in the final episode in a live TV broadcast from the property, in the vein of Nigel Kneale's The Quatermass Experiment and Quatermass and the Pit, in both of which "all hell breaks loose". However, when producer Ruth Baumgarten doubted the viability of an entire mini-series and recommended instead a 90-minute TV special, Volk suggested that they "do the whole thing like Episode Six", portraying it as an actual "live" broadcast fronted by well-known TV personalities.

The BBC, however, became concerned about the effect the broadcast would have on the public and very nearly pulled the show shortly before broadcast. Ultimately, they insisted on adding opening credits including the writer's name, in addition to a Screen One title sequence.

== Supernatural depictions ==
=== Ghost ===
Behind-the-scenes photo of actor Keith Ferrari as "Pipes"

The film's fictional villainous spectre, referred to by the children as "Pipes" and credited simply as "Ghost", is depicted as a merging of negative spiritual energies, which parapsychologist Dr Pascoe theorises have been accumulating for years, possibly back to prehistory. Its physical appearance mostly resembles that of deceased child molester Raymond Tunstall, a fictional character who, it is revealed by a phone-in caller, killed himself at the haunted property some time in the 1960s after himself being possessed by the entity. His eyes are missing and his face is badly mauled, owing to Tunstall locking himself up with his multiple pet cats prior to his suicide, and the cats having "got hungry" in the week prior to the discovery of Tunstall's body. The entity also wears a black woman's dress, likely that of "baby farmer" and child killer Mother Seddons.

It is suggested that the character of Suzanne Early may become the next "layer" in the ghost's spiritual make-up, and in the final moments of the film the entity possesses television host Michael Parkinson.

In May 2010, at a public screening of the film at The Invisible Dot in Camden, director Lesley Manning revealed that she provided the voice of Pipes the ghost after the professional voice artist hired for the production could not accurately replicate the style of voice she had intended.

=== Technology ===
Many methods familiar to modern ghost-hunting shows such as Most Haunted are demonstrated in the show, some of which were either genuine state-of-the-art technology at the time or simulated to give the idea they were real. The house was allegedly equipped with motion detectors, temperature sensors, and covert cameras. The temperature sensors were referred to as being able to check for dramatic changes in temperature that ghost hunters link to real-life ghost sightings. One major feature of the show was a genuine thermographic camera, which, although it did not pick up any ghosts, came in very handy when all the lights failed at the end of the show.

=== Ghostly depictions ===
The programme makers used many examples of allegedly paranormal phenomena. During the course of the programme there are many references to characters being allegedly possessed by a ghost who, whilst doing so, maniacally recites nursery rhymes. This happens in a tape recording of the eldest daughter Suzanne, later in a 'live' section to the same character and eventually Michael Parkinson himself is seen to be possessed. The show references temperature changes being linked to ghosts and claims to be monitoring the temperature in each room of the house to check for this. Mutilated household objects are shown which were purportedly analysed by the Army and found to have been subjected to rapid temperature change. In both alleged recordings and live segments of the show we see objects moving of their own accord – which, it is claimed, is a result of poltergeist activity – also, a perfectly round patch of water appears on the living room carpet, and animal scratch marks appear on Suzanne's face. Banging noises are intermittently heard during the climax of the show. At one point the producers play on this by exposing Suzanne as the one causing the banging noises, creating a hoax within a hoax. However, this later occurs when both girls are accounted for.

Near the end of the programme, when a wind whips through the studio, the cups and plates brought in by Dr Pascoe as evidence of the poltergeist activity in the house begin to move on their own, and one cup falls onto the studio floor and smashes into pieces. Although the ghost of the story is only heard to speak through the voices of others we hear the disembodied sounds of cats whenever phenomena are taking place.

== Controversy ==
Although Ghostwatch was aired under the Screen One drama banner, its documentary style led many viewers to believe the events were real, causing much controversy after the show's airing. The BBC was besieged with phone calls from irate and frightened viewers, among them Michael Parkinson's alarmed 81-year-old mother. British tabloids and other newspapers criticised the BBC the next day for the disturbing nature of some scenes, such as Greene's final scene where she is locked in an under-stairs cupboard with the howling ghost, and Parkinson's eerie possession scene.

A false rumour persisted that Sarah Greene had advertised the programme on her Saturday morning children's show Going Live!, including a visit to the location of the "haunting", and gave the impression that she was taking part in a "reality show". This rumour was debunked via the Ghostwatch: Behind the Curtain blog (which gathered information for a documentary about the show). After acquiring the three most likely episodes of Going Live (the week before, the day Ghostwatch was shown, and the week after), the blog's editors found no reference to the show. Greene did however appear on the following Monday's Children's BBC strand to reassure younger viewers the show was not real.

The programme has yet to be repeated in full on any UK-based television channel, following its initial broadcast.

=== Psychological effects ===
A number of psychological effects were reported in Ghostwatch's wake:

Eighteen-year-old factory worker Martin Denham, who suffered from learning difficulties and had a mental age of 13, died by suicide five days after the programme aired. The family home had suffered with a faulty central heating system which had caused the pipes to knock; Denham linked this to the activity in the show, causing him great worry. He left a suicide note reading "if there are ghosts I will be ... with you always as a ghost". His mother and stepfather, April and Percy Denham, blamed the BBC. They claimed that Martin was "hypnotised and obsessed" by the programme. The Broadcasting Standards Commission refused their complaint, along with 34 others, as being outside their remit, but the High Court granted the Denhams' permission for a judicial review requiring the BSC to hear their complaint.

In its ruling, the BSC stated: "The BBC had a duty to do more than simply hint at the deception it was practising on the audience. In Ghostwatch there was a deliberate attempt to cultivate a sense of menace." They ruled that the programme was excessively distressing and graphic – referring to the scratches on the children and the reference to mutilated animals – and that it had aired too soon after the 9pm watershed. They further stated that "the presence in the programme of presenters familiar from children's programmes ... took some parents off-guard in deciding whether their children could continue to view."

The film's producers argued that Ghostwatch had aired during a drama slot, that it was recognisable as fiction to a vast majority, and that running more obvious disclaimers or other announcements that claimed that the programme was fictional would have ruined its effectiveness. They also stated that, had they anticipated the audience reaction, they would have made its fictional nature clearer. However, after the BSC ruling, they issued an apology.

Simons and Silveira published a report in the British Medical Journal in February 1994, describing two cases of Ghostwatch-induced post-traumatic stress disorder in children, both ten-year-old boys. They stated that these were the first reported cases of PTSD caused by a television programme. Responses to the article described a further four cases in children aged between eleven and 14, as well as one case in an eight-year-old that stemmed from watching the pre-watershed medical drama Casualty. The respondents also noted the potential for similar reactions in elderly people. However, the conclusion of the article states: "The rapid resolution of the children's symptoms suggests that the children suffered a brief anxiety reaction to the television programme; although they may have exhibited some of the features of post-traumatic stress disorder, this diagnosis in their cases is inappropriate."

== Home media ==
The British Film Institute released it on VHS and Region 2 DVD in November 2002.

Retrospective documentary Ghostwatch: Behind the Curtains was released to DVD in 2013. British label 101 Films released a Blu-ray disc in late 2022, including Do You Believe in Ghosts?, a new 30th anniversary documentary on the Ghostwatch phenomenon.

== Legacy ==
=== Inspirations ===
Ghostwatch has also been credited for being amongst the direct inspirations for several other successful, contemporary works.

"In fact I have met Derren Brown and I have it on his authority that he was inspired by Ghostwatch when he made his TV programme called Séance ... I'm very proud that he rates the show I wrote. I am a great fan of his programmes ... in which, like Ghostwatch, he asks us to question the things we trust."

— Stephen Volk

A comment left by writer Stephen Volk on the official Ghostwatch: Behind the Curtains homepage claims that British illusionist Derren Brown once told him that the film had at least partially inspired his similarly controversial "TV hoax" Séance. This was later confirmed by Brown himself whilst being interviewed for the BBC Four documentary Ghosts in the Machine.

People have pointed out the similarities between Ghostwatch and the 1999 American found footage horror film The Blair Witch Project. When asked about the similarities on the podcast, Diminishing Returns, The Blair Witch Project co-director, Eduardo Sánchez, stated that they were not made aware of the film until after the film had been released.

The 2018 British horror television programme Inside No. 9 episode "Dead Line" has been noted for its similarities to Ghostwatch. The episode, which was presented as a live broadcast of the series, was deliberately influenced by Ghostwatch, particularly its use of apparently malfunctioning television broadcasts and hidden supernatural figures. During a British Film Institute Q&A, co-creator Reece Shearsmith confirmed that the creators were conscious of Ghostwatch when producing the episode, stating that the "subliminal ways" in which the ghost Pipes was concealed in Ghostwatch were "very much on our minds" when deciding where to place the ghosts in Dead Line. Co-creator Steve Pemberton similarly identified Ghostwatch as an influence, specifically citing the number of times Pipes could be seen as an inspiration for the hidden ghosts in Dead Line. Academic analysis has likewise discussed Dead Line alongside Ghostwatch as examples of televisual Gothic, particularly in their use of the television broadcast itself as a source of horror.

More recently, the creative team behind the 2020 British Zoom-based computer screen horror film Host have credited Ghostwatch as an influence. Co-writer Jed Shepherd, who had appeared on a podcast with Volk prior to working on Host, stated in an interview that he and his collaborators considered Host to be their version of Ghostwatch, and noted that the film has "a lot of Ghostwatch references", including displaying a Zoom caller ID of 31101992, referring to the date of Ghostwatch's broadcast.

=== Sequel ('31/10') ===
As featured in his collection Dark Corners, screenwriter Stephen Volk wrote a short story entitled 31/10, which is effectively a sequel to Ghostwatch. The piece was later selected for "The Year's Best Fantasy and Horror 2007: Twentieth Annual Collection", and nominated for the Horror Writers' Association (HWA) Bram Stoker Award, and British Fantasy Award for Best Short Story 2006.

The story itself centres on Volk taking part in a fictitious, tenth anniversary edition of Ghostwatch in 2002. Venturing into the previously sealed-off BBC studio space where the original show took place, he is accompanied by a small team of individuals whose lives were somehow affected by the broadcast, ten years previously.

A free PDF file of 31/10 can be found on writer Stephen Volk's official website.

== Ghostwatch: Behind the Curtains ==
Ghostwatch: Behind the Curtains
- Announcement poster. Artwork by Arfon Jones
- Directed by: Rich Lawden
- Produced by: Rich Lawden; Lesley Manning
- Starring: Michael Parkinson; Sarah Greene; Mike Smith; Craig Charles; Gillian Bevan
- Cinematography: Alex Ryle; Adam Gutch; Liam Iandoli; Curtis Reid
- Edited by: Lesley Manning
- Production company: Lawman Productions
- Release dates: 2012 (DVD release, 2013)
- Running time: 90 minutes
- Country: United Kingdom
- Language: English

Ghostwatch: Behind the Curtains is a retrospective documentary, completed in 2012 and released on DVD in 2013, chronicling the making of and reaction to Ghostwatch.

The Behind the Curtains subtitle is derived from where fictitious poltergeist, Pipes, 'hides' in the shared bedroom of characters, Kim and Suzanne Early. It is also one of the chapter headings on the British Film Institute Ghostwatch DVD release.

=== Developments ===
On 21 February 2008, the GhostwatchBtC channel was launched on YouTube. All that was initially revealed regarding the project was a notice asking fans of the original film to contribute any Ghostwatch-related stories or recollections via the comments boxes provided.

"Since October of 2007, plans to develop a retrospective documentary on the "legendary" Screen One, Hallowe'en special, Ghostwatch, have been slowly gathering a head of steam."

— Ghostwatch: Behind the Curtains YouTube page

On 31 October 2008 (exactly sixteen years after the original film was originally broadcast), a production blog was launched.

The first article to be published was written by the documentary's creator, Rich Lawden, in which he revealed the idea to make a retrospective first originated at a Cineformation screening held at the Watershed in Bristol.

Subsequent articles have included a special Hallowe'en message from Stephen Volk, and a link to a new Ghostwatch article written by lead actor, Michael Parkinson. Between December 2008 and February 2009, a web forum, and Twitter, MySpace and Facebook pages were also added.

On 31 October 2011, the first official production still was uploaded to mark both Hallowe'en Night and the conclusion of National Séance 2011. The image features cast members, Sarah Greene and Mike Smith sitting with an interviewer, and two additional crew members, in an aircraft hangar. A quote beneath the picture reads: "Stay tuned for 2012, Ghostwatchers".

On 24 October 2012, one week before the show's 20th Anniversary, a teaser trailer for the project was announced on SFX. A DVD of the completed film was released by the producers on eBay in March 2013, and within hours, had to be re-listed directly on the Lawman Productions website after quickly selling out. In October 2013, a companion book, written by Lawden, was released on Lulu containing a foreword by writer Stephen Volk, the sequel story 31/10, new interviews, and an extensive production diary for the documentary itself.

In October 2016, it was announced that the online platform BBC Store was to offer both Ghostwatch and the retrospective Behind the Curtains documentary as part of the new Frightmares collection, in time for Halloween. Shortly thereafter, it was revealed that the documentary had ranked among the best performing titles in the collection, also making the top ten best sellers for the first two weeks, after launch.

=== National Séance ===
To mark the show's 18th anniversary, a "live" event took place in lieu of a full repeat screening on British television. Dubbed National Séance, fans were asked to simultaneously play their personal recordings of the show at precisely 9:25pm (just as Ghostwatch was originally broadcast) and tweet about the screening as it happened on the social networking site Twitter. The event has subsequently become a yearly tradition. The event is known for celebrating the original drama by the unveiling of special artwork, or occasionally unseen or unheard material relating to its production, and often directly contributes to the hashtag #ghostwatch trending on the platform.

In 2020, the tenth National Séance took the form of a live YouTube stream via Zoom hosted by Rich, called National Séance Live, featuring special guests, Mike Aiton (Soundman/himself), Gillian Bevan (Doctor Pascoe), Richard Drew (Assistant Set Designer), Sarah Greene (Reporter/herself), Lesley Manning (Director) and Stephen Volk (Writer). Producer Ruth Baumgarten was also expected to make an appearance, but ultimately could not. The event was made available to view on the Behind The Curtains YouTube page.

=== Critical reception ===
"Lawden's passion for Ghostwatch is shared by many of its younger viewers, drawn back in adulthood by its chilling allure [...] He scores an impressive coup in securing interviews with all the key players [...] A worthwhile enterprise."

— Simon McCallum, Sight & Sound

The film was met with a positive response from both fans and critics alike. Notably, leading film and TV magazines SFX and Starburst awarded 4/5 and 8/10 ratings respectively.

The film was subsequently selected for inclusion in the BFI Mediatheque, for the upcoming Haunted collection, from December 2013-onwards.

== See also ==
- Mockumentary
- "The War of the Worlds" (1938 radio drama)
- Mermaids: The Body Found, 2012 TV mockumentary mistakenly believed to be true by many who watched it.
- Late Night with the Devil
- Alien Autopsy
- Alien Abduction: Incident in Lake County
- The McPhearson Tape
- The Blair Witch Project
- List of ghost films
- Found footage (film technique)
