= Harry Greene (television personality) =

Welsh television personality (1923–2013)

- Born: Henry Howard Greenhouse; 21 November 1923; Rhymney, near Caerphilly, Monmouthshire, Wales
- Died: 4 March 2013 (aged 89)
- Education: Rhymney Grammar School; Newport College of Art (now the University of South Wales); Cardiff College of Art, Cardiff University
- Occupations: Draughtsman, teacher, actor, diy expert
- Years active: 1939–2013
- Known for: UK's first television DIY expert
- Notable work: Handy Round the Home, Dream Home, DIY SOS, Changing Rooms, House Doctor, DIY Challenge, QVC UK
- Spouse: Marjie Lawrence (1955–2010) Her death
- Children: Sarah, Laura, Robin

Harry Greene (21 November 1923 – 4 March 2013) was a Welsh television personality, known for being the UK's first television DIY expert. During his lifetime, Greene wrote over 23 books, presented more than 2,000 DIY programmes, and via his building company had provided bespoke construction services to over 32 stars of stage and television.

== Early life ==
Henry Howard Greenhouse was born in Rhymney, near Pontlottyn (then in Monmouthshire), to former Jack Greenhouse and his wife Una. His father, who had returned from fighting in World War I suffering from mustard gas poisoning, and mother were interested in the arts, poetry and music and regularly entertained at their home in Colenso Terrace. From aged 10, Greene would spend time at weekends with his uncle, a maintenance man and electrical engineer at Bargoed's Top Pit, who taught Greene to use tools properly.

After passing the eleven-plus exam, he was accepted at Rhymney Grammar School, where in 1936 he won the National Eisteddfod under-17s prize for drawing. He was taught sport by Olympic swimmer C. B. Thomas, under whom Greene became a record-breaking runner at county level, a gifted rugby union player, and champion junior Welsh long jumper.

Whilst training as an engineering draughtsman at Newport College of Art (now the University of South Wales) in 1939, he won a scholarship to study architecture, Interior and Illustrative Design at Cardiff College of Art, with the final year at Cardiff University. However, due to the outbreak of World War II he had to delay starting the course, and was subsequently attached to REME as a draughtsman, working on a classified tank design for the Russian front. His father died from the effects of his earlier mustard gas poisoning in 1943.

== Career ==
Post war, Greene took up his place at Cardiff College, training as a draughtsman's assistant and architect. During this time he befriended fellow student and later Doctor Who script writer Terry Nation, with whom he worked on student productions and then working weekends at the New Theatre, Cardiff as a stagehand. This led to amateur acting with the Unity Theatre company, and as a volunteer assistant at Cory Hall on Eynon Evans weekly BBC Wales radio show, where he met Harry Secombe.

Whilst training to become a teacher, he came up with a money-making idea to buy an ex-WD 350cc Royal Enfield motorbike. Using waste sheets of perforated laminate left over from sequin manufacturing, he made Christmas decorations in his student digs. On graduation, with his friend Henry Curly who also bought the same motorbike model, the pair travelled 6,000 miles through France, Switzerland and Italy. On returning home, Greene took up the position of Art and Drama teacher at Tredegar Grammar School, earning £20 a week. Taking a class to see a performance of Uranium 235 starring Joan Littlewood, his friend and producer of Unity Theatre introduced the pair. Littlewood was looking for a young Welshman to play William Shakespeare's Owen Glendower, and Taffy in Ewan MacColl's Paradise Street. Additionally as the owner/producer of the touring company Theatre Workshop, she also wanted someone who could build theatre sets and drive the lorry.

Greene resigned his teaching job the following day and moved to Manchester to join the Theatre Workshop, often earning less than £5 a week from the company's takings. In 1949, he changed his name to Harry Greene by deed of change of name. After two years the company moved to a new base at the near-derelict Theatre Royal music hall in Stratford, London. After Greene designed and organised the theatre's reconstruction programme, the first production was Twelfth Night in late 1953, for which Greene made the sets and also acted in.

On New Year's Day 1954, the company had 200 applicants for their next production, including actress Marjie Lawrence. Greene and Lawrence quickly became a couple and married in 1955. Theatre Workshop became such a success that productions would later transfer to London's West End, bringing both Greene and Lawrence to national attention. During his acting career, Greene starred in over 40 films, opposite actors including Sean Connery, Sir John Gielgud, Melina Mercouri, Lana Turner and Jean Seberg.

== DIY expert ==
At the launch of independent broadcaster Associated Rediffusion, the couple starred in soap opera Round the Redways, about a couple who run a DIY store, with Greene playing an inept repair man.

Desperate to fill the schedules, Associated Rediffusion took up Marjie's proposal for Harry to film a DIY show based on him doing up their flat in Primrose Hill, North London. First shown on 4 January 1957, Handy Round the Home emphasised practical demonstrations that viewers could copy at home, with his catchphrase, "Safety first; DIY second" making him a household name.

In the 1980s Greene was employed by Greg Dyke at TV-AM, devising, writing and producing Dream Home, which Greene co-presented alongside his daughter Sarah. Greene persuaded the company to buy a dilapidated cottage in Hampshire, which they then filmed him doing up and converting through construction. At the end of the project, the house was given away in a competition. He then joined the BBC's Pebble Mill at One, where he built a new house from scratch with an accompanying team.

After this he set up a building company, which specialised in providing new homes, extensions and bespoke building services to actors and television personalities. By 2000, the firm had provided services to over 32 stars, including Barbara Windsor, Siân Lloyd, Paul McKenna and Neil Morrissey.

In the early 1990s, although still presenting, Greene created and acted as a consultant on the new genre of DIY programmes, including DIY SOS, Changing Rooms, House Doctor and DIY Challenge. He remained a regular on various terrestrial UK channels until the late 1990s, and then various satellite television home shopping channels, including QVC UK.

== Personal life ==
Greene and his wife had three children: actress and television presenter Sarah; television presenter Laura; and businessman Robin who runs a business in Switzerland.

Greene collapsed and died a few days after returning home in March 2013 from a holiday with his daughter Sarah and her husband, fellow presenter Mike Smith.

== Publications ==
- Harry Greene (19 December 2003). Harry Greene's Complete DIY Problem Solver.
- Harry Greene (August 1990). Do-it-yourself Problem Solver.
- Harry Greene (2 April 1987). On the House: Harry Greene's Do-it-yourself Handbook.
