= Marjie Lawrence =

English actress (1932–2010)

- Photo from TV Times, 1977
- Born: 21 January 1932; Birmingham, Warwickshire, England
- Died: 16 June 2010 (aged 78); Esher, Surrey, England
- Education: Birmingham School of Speech & Drama
- Occupation: Actress
- Years active: 1952–2010
- Spouse: Harry Greene (m. 1955)
- Children: Sarah, Laura, Robin

Marjie Lawrence (21 January 1932 – 16 June 2010) was an English theatre, film and television actress. She spoke the first words uttered on ITV.

== Early life ==
Born in Birmingham, Warwickshire, Lawrence undertook weekend acting classes from age 12 at the Birmingham Theatre School. After completing her schooling, she was accepted to be trained at the Birmingham School of Speech & Drama on a three-year undergraduate course.

== Career ==
On graduating, Lawrence undertook work with George Dare's touring company in Norfolk, learning and acting in 36 plays over eight weeks. After the company returned to Bacton, she left the company with another actress and started working at the local sanitorium to earn enough money to afford the train fare to London. After leaving the hospital on finding out that most of the staff had TB, her former landlady introduced her to Lady Rawlinson, wife of Sir Alfred Rawlinson, 4th Baronet, at North Walsham, who employed her as a cook. Unable to cook, Marjie stayed for the summer of 1953 as the children's nanny.

=== Theatre Workshop ===
Moving to Swiss Cottage, London in October 1953, Lawrence undertook work as a filing clerk in Victoria, London during the day, while watching for acting opportunities in The Stage. On New Year's Day 1954, she was one of 200 people who attended an audition at the Theatre Royal in Stratford for Joan Littlewood's Theatre Workshop company. The facilitator for the audition was Harry Greene. Littlewood put her through a two-hour audition before accepting her into the company. Greene and Lawrence quickly became a couple.

Theatre Workshop became such a success that productions would later transfer to London's West End theatres, bringing both Greene and Lawrence to national attention, alongside actors including Sir Sean Connery, Sir John Gielgud, Melina Mercouri, Lana Turner, Jean Seberg and Barbara Windsor.

After Greene and Lawrence married in 1955, the couple left Theatre Workshop and both began working in television. Her last production for Theatre Workshop was in Arden of Faversham, with which the company visited the Paris International Festival in 1954. In 1959 Marjie joined the Theatre Workshop transfer to the West End of Wolf Mankowitz's street market musical Make Me An Offer, with music and lyrics by Monty Norman and David Heneker.

At the launch of independent broadcaster Associated-Rediffusion, the married couple starred in soap opera Round at the Redways, about a couple who run a DIY store, with Greene playing an inept repair man; the show ran for seven months. As a result, Lawrence uttered the first words on ITV: "There's something wrong with this".

=== Greene as a DIY expert ===
Desperate to fill the schedules, Associated-Rediffusion took up Lawrence's proposal for Harry Greene to film a DIY show based on him doing up their flat on Oppidans Road, off Primrose Hill, North London. First shown on 4 January 1957, Handy Round the Home emphasised practical demonstrations that viewers could copy at home, with his catchphrase, "Safety first; DIY second" making him a household name. This led to Greene writing over 23 books and creating 2,000 hours of DIY programmes over the rest of his career, until his death in 2013.

Greene and Lawrence also set up a building company, which specialised in providing houses and building services to actors and television personalities.

=== Film and TV career ===
By 1972, Lawrence had given birth to the couple's three children, and was returning to work across theatre, film and television. Through her working relationship with Peter Sellers and Eric Sykes, she had the same agent and worked regularly from then until her death in 2010. Her works included:

- Film: After the Ball (1957), Only Two Can Play (1962), Design for Loving (1962), A Place to Go (1963), The Early Bird (1965), Stranger in the House (1967), Inspector Clouseau (1968), Tell Me Lies (1968), Carry On Henry (1971), Hands of the Ripper (1971), I, Monster (1971), Bless This House (1972), The Squeeze (1977), Shiner (2000)
- Television drama: The Sweeney (1974) The Rainbow (1988)
- Television comedy: The Benny Hill Show, The Arthur Haynes Show (with Eric Sykes)
- Television series: Coronation Street, Crossroads, Danger UXB, Public Eye, Unnatural Causes, Weavers Green, Z-Cars
- Theatre: The Bed Sitting Room (Mermaid Theatre), The Three Sisters (Royal Court Theatre)

She had been ill since 2004 with rheumatoid arthritis, but managed to continue working, latterly appearing in a bed-bound role in the BBC soap opera Doctors.

== Personal life ==
Lawrence and Greene had three children: actress and television presenter Sarah; television presenter Laura; and businessman Robin.

After being diagnosed with ovarian cancer, Lawrence died a few weeks later at a hospice in Surrey on 16 June 2010.

Her widower, Harry Greene, collapsed and died a few days after returning home in March 2013 from a holiday with his daughter, Sarah, and Sarah's husband, fellow presenter Mike Smith (d.2014).

== Filmography ==
Year	Title	Role	Notes
1957	The Counterfeit Plan	Cinema Cashier	
1957	After the Ball	Mary the Maid	
1959	Mystery in the Mine	Artist	Children's Film Foundation serial
1962	Only Two Can Play	Girl in Bus	Uncredited
1962	The Spanish Sword	Barmaid	
1962	Design for Loving	Mrs. Samson	
1962	On the Beat	Crying Lady	
1962	"Moment Of Decision"	Sally Mason	The Scales Of Justice
1962	"Time to Remember"	Vivienne	Edgar Wallace Mysteries
1963	Sparrows Can't Sing	Girl	Uncredited
1963	Heavens Above!	Quarrelling Housewife	
1963	A Place to Go	Sally	Uncredited
1963	"The Bath"	Martine	Steptoe & Son, Series 2 Episode 2
1964	"No Forwarding Address"	Beryl Frodsham	The Protectors, Episode 4
1965	The Early Bird	Woman in Negligee	
1967	Stranger in the House	Brenda	
1968	Inspector Clouseau	Peggy	Uncredited
1968	Tell Me Lies	Guest	Documentary
1970	Catweazle	Theda	
1971	Carry On Henry	Serving Maid	
1971	Hands of the Ripper	Dolly	
1971	I, Monster	Annie	
1972	Bless This House	Alma	
1976	I'm Not Feeling Myself Tonight	Caretaker's Wife	
1977	The Squeeze	Beryl	
1979	All the Fun of the Fair	Flora Collins	
1982	Remembrance	Mark's mother	
1985	Lamb	Department Store Assistant	
2000	Shiner	Aunt Connie	
2001	Large	Granny	
