= Debbie Thrower =

British broadcast journalist

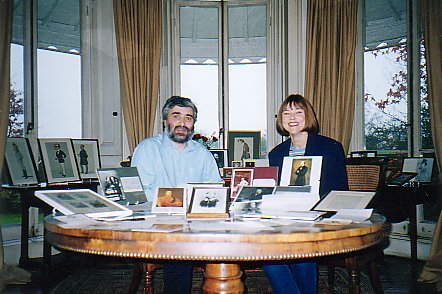
- Thrower (right) interviewing a collector on Collector's Lot
- Born: 17 November 1957 (age 68); Nairobi, Kenya
- Education: Edgehill College; University of London
- Occupations: Broadcaster; Journalist
- Known for: Meridian Tonight; Collectors' Lot; Songs of Praise; Afternoon show on BBC Radio 2
- Spouse(s): Peter Thompson (1983–2018), Charles Parker (2020–)
- Children: 2

Debbie Thrower (born 17 November 1957 in Nairobi, Kenya) is an English journalist and broadcaster who presented BBC national news bulletins in the 1980s and ITV Meridian's flagship news programme Meridian Tonight (southern edition) from its inception in 1993 to 2009. She is the founder and pioneer of Anna Chaplaincy for Older People, part of The Bible Reading Fellowship, BRF.

== Early life and education ==
She was born in Nairobi, the capital of Kenya, and spent her early childhood there before she and her family came back to England, settling in Devon. She was educated at Edgehill College, formerly a girls' independent school in Bideford, Devon, and the University of London where she obtained a degree in French.

== Career ==
=== Journalism ===
Thrower originally trained as a newspaper journalist at the Wimbledon Guardian. She began her broadcasting career at BBC Radio Leicester, before moving to BBC Radio Solent in the early 1980s, and then transferring to television as the co-presenter of BBC South Today. In 1987, she replaced Jan Leeming reading national BBC news bulletins, primarily at weekends and then read the Nine O’Clock News for a time. She also became a regular presenter on Songs of Praise, and the Sunday programme on BBC Radio 4.

=== Radio and television ===
Transferring to ITV, Thrower and colleague Fred Dinenage were presenters of Meridian Tonight (South) when it first aired in 1993. In addition, she was the first person seen after the changeover of TV contractor from TVS to Meridian, shortly after the stroke of midnight on New Year's Day 1993, covering the celebrations at Winchester Cathedral, which was celebrating its 900th anniversary. Her final show as presenter of Meridian Tonight was on 6 February 2009.

She was latterly the final presenter for Channel 4's antiques programme Collectors' Lot, which aired on weekday afternoons.

She also had a BBC Radio 2 afternoon show between 1995 and 1998 replacing long-time presenter Gloria Hunniford. On 13 January 2009, Thrower confirmed in an interview with The News in Portsmouth that she was leaving ITV Meridian to concentrate on freelance work and her voluntary ministry as a Church of England reader or Licensed Lay Minister (LLM). Thrower is a Lay Canon Emeritus of Winchester Cathedral. In 2016 she was awarded an honorary degree for public service from the University of Winchester – Doctor of Letters honoris causa.
