= Stephen Volk =

Welsh screenwriter & novelist (born 1954)

- Born: 3 July 1954 (age 72); Pontypridd, Wales
- Education: University of Bristol
- Occupations: Novelist; screenwriter
- Writing career
- Years active: 1986–present
- Genre: Horror

Stephen Volk (born 3 July 1954) is a Welsh screenwriter and novelist who specializes in the horror genre. He wrote the screenplays for numerous horror films, including Ken Russell's Gothic (1986), The Kiss (1988), and William Friedkin's The Guardian (1990). In 1992, Volk wrote the teleplay for the BBC pseudo-documentary Ghostwatch. Other screenwriting credits include Octane (2003) and The Awakening (2011).

== Early life and work ==
Stephen Volk was born in Pontypridd, Wales on 3 July 1954. Volk has stated his interest in horror was triggered by watching the TV drama The Stone Tape by Nigel Kneale, and the film Don't Look Now by Nicolas Roeg. He studied at Lanchester Polytechnic in Coventry, and the University of Bristol. Volk then worked as an advertising copywriter before becoming a full-time writer. Volk's first produced work was Ken Russell's film Gothic in 1986. Volk also wrote a script, Horror Movie, for Goldcrest Films that was never made due to Goldcrest's collapse.

== Ghostwatch ==
His most famous work is Ghostwatch, a controversial drama shown on BBC1 on Halloween 1992. It is commonly misrepresented as a hoax documentary, but this was never the intention. It was originally planned as a six-part series for the BBC. However, the producer of the series, Ruth Baumgarten, didn't believe it had commercial viability. Stephen reworked the script so that everything would be set "Like episode six" and repitched it as a 90-minute live broadcast drama on behalf of BBC's Screen One drama segment. Ruth accepted the new format.

== Other work ==
Volk's TV work often involves the supernatural and the paranormal, such as with the ITV1 thriller series Afterlife (2005–06). Volk has written fiction in the horror and ghost story genres; some of these stories were collected in the book Dark Corners (2006). In 1995, Volk wrote two serials of the series Ghosts. Volk's fiction often features real people as characters: the novella Whitstable (2013) features the actor Peter Cushing, while Leytonstone (2015) deals with a young Alfred Hitchcock. In 2018, Volk published The Dark Masters Trilogy, an omnibus featuring Whitstable and Leytonstone, as well as a new novella, Netherwood. Netherwood features fictionalised versions of the writer Dennis Wheatley and the occultist Aleister Crowley. Volk also wrote a monthly column about horror for Black Static magazine until the end of 2016.

Volk's story "The Chapel of Unrest" was read on stage by actor Jim Broadbent at London's Bush Theatre in 2013.

== Bibliography ==
=== Novels and novellas ===
- Gothic (1987, novelisation of the 1986 film)
- Vardøger (2009)
- Whitstable (2013)
- Leytonstone (2015)
- Netherwood (2018)
- The Dark Masters Trilogy (2018)

=== Short story collections ===
- Dark Corners (2006)
- Monsters in the Heart (2013)
- The Parts We Play (2016)
- Under a Raven's Wing (2021)
- Lies of Tenderness (2022)
- The Good Unknown and Other Ghost Stories (2023)

=== Non-fiction ===
- Coffinmaker's Blues: Collected Writings on Terror (2019)

== Filmography ==
Title	Year	Writer	Story	Notes	Ref.
Gothic	1986	Yes	No		
The Kiss	1988	Yes	Yes		
The Guardian	1990	Yes	No		
Ghostwatch	1992	Yes	No	Television film	
Superstition	2001	Yes	No		
Cyclops	2001	Yes	No	Television film	
Octane	2003	Yes	No	Alternate title: Pulse	
Afterlife	2005–2006	Yes	No	9 episodes; also creator	
The Awakening	2011	Yes	No		
Midwinter of the Spirit	2015	Yes	No	3 episodes	
My Haunted House	2018	Yes	No		

== Personal life ==
He and his wife Patricia, who is a sculptor, live in Bradford-on-Avon, Wiltshire.

== Sources ==
- Rose, James (2016). "Stephen Volk". In McCarthy, Elizabeth; Murphy, Bernice M. (eds.). Lost Souls of Horror and the Gothic : Fifty-Four Neglected Authors, Actors, Artists and Others. Jefferson, North Carolina: McFarland. pp. 220–223. ISBN 978-1-476-66314-2.
