= Chapel Street, Belgravia =

Street in London, England

Coordinates: 51°30′0.11″N 0°9′2.35″W

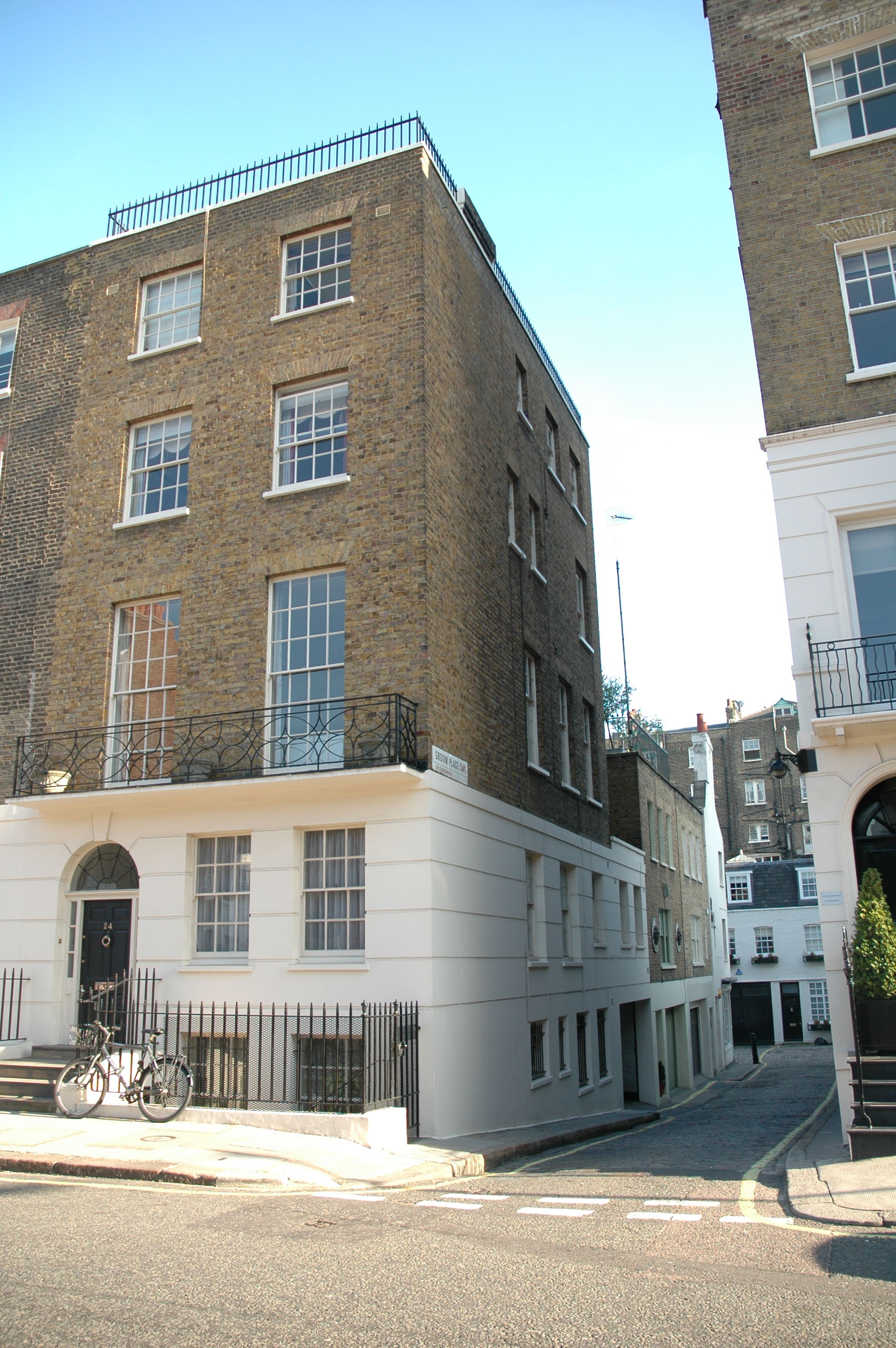
24 Chapel Street, Belgravia, London

Chapel Street is a street in central London's Belgravia district. It runs south-west to north-east from Belgrave Square to Grosvenor Place.

No. 24 was home to Brian Epstein, the manager of the Beatles, who moved there in January 1965 from a flat in nearby Whaddon House. The house hosted numerous parties, including the Sgt. Pepper's Lonely Hearts Club Band album release party. He died there on 27 August 1967 of an accidental barbiturate and alcohol overdose.

Gerald Grosvenor, 6th Duke of Westminster gave a house in the street to Norman Tebbit and his wife, following the Brighton bombing in 1984.

Michael Heseltine lived at No. 30 for many years, formerly home to Nina Campbell. It was from the steps of this house that Heseltine announced that he would challenge Margaret Thatcher for the leadership of the Conservative Party.
