= Sarah Greene =

English television presenter (born 1957)

- Born: Elizabeth Sarah Greene; 24 October 1957 (age 69); St Pancras, London, England
- Education: University of Hull
- Occupation: Television presenter
- Years active: 1980–present
- Known for: Live TV presenting and acting
- Spouse: Mike Smith (1989–2014; his death)

Elizabeth Sarah Greene (born 24 October 1957) is an English television presenter. She co-presented Blue Peter from May 1980 until June 1983, and hosted the Saturday-morning series Saturday Superstore and Going Live!.

== Early life and career ==
Greene was born in London, the daughter of Welsh DIY expert Harry Greene and English actress Marjie Lawrence. She is the elder sister of presenter Laura Greene. Greene was educated at Gospel Oak Primary School and the Grey Coat Hospital School, London, while also pursuing child acting roles. She graduated with a degree in Drama from the University of Hull. She then sought acting roles in Birmingham, Manchester and London.

== Television career ==
In January 1980, Greene had a role in the daytime drama Together (Southern Television / ITV). She first appeared on Blue Peter after appearing in the BBC adaptation of Pamela Brown's The Swish of the Curtain, following which she was asked by the programme's editor Biddy Baxter to be the replacement for the outgoing Tina Heath. At that time, Greene was the youngest ever presenter of Blue Peter, aged 22, and within two weeks was filming in Cornwall for the series. The programme won a BAFTA Award during Greene's three-year tenure.

After leaving Blue Peter, Greene presented Saturday Superstore with Mike Read, and subsequently co-presented Going Live! with Phillip Schofield. It was during her time on Going Live! that Greene won the 'Best Female on TV' SOS Award for three years running and presided over the phone-in. She then began to appear in television commercials for Nescafé coffee. Later, she fronted Channel 4's daytime antiques programme Collectors' Lot.

On 10 September 1988, Greene and her partner Mike Smith, the television and radio presenter, were seriously injured in a helicopter accident in Gloucestershire. The couple spent several weeks in hospital before Greene returned to present Going Live!, while still in plaster.

In addition to presenting magazine series such as the BBC's Pebble Mill and Good Morning Summer alongside Will Hanrahan, Greene acted in the Doctor Who serial Attack of the Cybermen, Casualty, Brookside and French & Saunders. In 1991, Greene and Smith joined Maggie Philbin and Robbie Vincent as the presenters of Hospital Watch, a live fly-on-the-wall series on BBC One which had been shown on the channel since February 1986.

On 31 October 1992, she co-presented with Smith a hoax paranormal programme called Ghostwatch, which also featured Craig Charles and talk-show host Michael Parkinson. Greene presented a BBC One game show called Happy Families in 1993, alongside Andrew O'Connor. Greene and Smith made a foray into feature films with The Man Who Knew Too Little (1997), starring Bill Murray; they played presenters of The Theatre of Life, a fictional British television series which promised the participant a role in a crime drama.

In 1996, Greene began a four-year partnership with the Carlton Food Network, hosting a daily news, debate and magazine series. Later, Greene appeared in the ITV programme Have I Been Here Before? and was also a regular presenter on magazine programme This Morning. She also made a guest appearance in the final episode of The Harry Hill Show, and from 2005 to 2007 she presented the Discovery Home & Health channel's Weddings Live, an annual six-hour broadcast which showcased several weddings live from across the country. Fellow presenters included Brendan Courtney and celebrity makeup artist and stylist Armand Beasley. Partnered with Fred Palascak, Greene competed on ITV's Dancing on Ice in 2008.

Later, Greene took part in an episode of BBC Wales's Coming Home programme, first shown on 22 December 2010. Her mother had died a month before filming, but she decided to continue the process, alongside her 87-year-old father. The programme was able to trace her family tree back to the 17th century in Wales.

Greene and her husband, Mike Smith, appeared on Pointless on BBC One in December 2012. Smith died on 1 August 2014, following complications after major heart surgery.

In April 2017, Greene guest presented an edition of This Morning alongside Phillip Schofield. She returned to guest-present in July that same year, and again on 4 and 18 August, alongside Rylan Clark-Neal.

In 2023, Greene began co-presenting the BBC One quiz show The Finish Line with Roman Kemp.

== Charity ==
Greene became an ambassador for ovarian cancer charity Target Ovarian Cancer in 2012.
