= Gillian Bevan =

English actress

- Born: 13 February 1956 (age 70); Stockport, England
- Occupation: Actress
- Years active: 1984–present

Gillian Bevan (born 13 February 1956) is an English actress, best known for her roles in British television shows and West End theatre.

In 1988 she played Dorothy in the Royal Shakespeare Company's revival of their version of The Wizard of Oz, also singing the role on the cast album. She also appeared as parapsychologist Dr Lin Pascoe in the controversial BBC drama Ghostwatch on 31 October 1992.

She portrayed Gina Hope in the UK medical drama Holby City. She played the wife of consultant Elliot Hope in the drama, who was struck with motor neurone disease. Bevan's character made the decision to end her life by euthanasia in Switzerland, and her touching performance won critical acclaim.

She also played Clare Hunter, the headteacher in the UK TV series Teachers. Bevan has also appeared in other UK TV series, including Heartbeat, Doctors, New Tricks, Peak Practice and The Chief.

In 2016, she appeared in the BBC TV series Father Brown as Mrs Steele, episode 4.6 "The Rod of Asclepius".

== Theatre performances ==
- Mrs Lovett in Sweeney Todd by Stephen Sondheim. Co-production with West Yorkshire Playhouse directed by James Brining at the Royal Exchange Theatre, Manchester (2013).
- Hera in The Last Days of Troy by Simon Armitage. Directed by Nick Bagnall at the Royal Exchange Theatre, Manchester (2014).
- Polonia in Hamlet. Directed by Sarah Frankcom at the Royal Exchange Theatre, Manchester (2014). Winner of the Best Supporting Actress Award, MTA.
- Cymbeline in Cymbeline for the RSC (the first woman to play the title role as a woman) at the RSC 2016.
- Maydays ( David Edgar) at The Other Place RSC 2018.
- Witch in Into the Woods by Stephen Sondheim. Directed by Matthew Xia at the Royal Exchange Theatre, Manchester (2015).
- Jack's Mother in Into the Woods by Stephen Sondheim. Directed by Terry Gilliam and Leah Hausman at the Theatre Royal, Bath (2022).
- Hazel in The Children, Theatre Royal Bury St Edmunds, 2023.
- Narrator and Pangloss in Candide, Welsh National Opera (first woman to play the parts), 2023.
- Lady Bracknell in The Importance of Being Earnest, Colchester Theatre, 2024.
- Dorothy Lintott in The History Boys, Bath Theatre Royal and tour, 2024.

== Discography ==
- Jerome Kern: Show Boat, conducted by John McGlinn, EMI 1988.
