= Collectors' Lot =

British daytime antiques and collectables television show

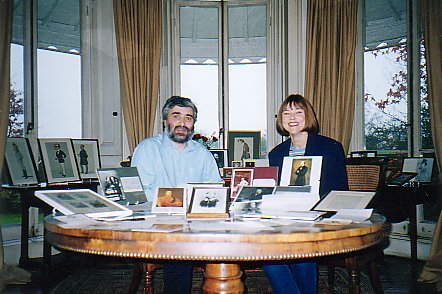
- Debbie Thrower interviewing a collector on 'Collector's Lot'
- Genre: Daytime; Factual
- Presented by: Debbie Thrower; Sue Cook; Sarah Greene
- Country of origin: United Kingdom
- Original language: English

Production
- Running time: 30 minutes (inc. adverts)
- Production company: Two Four

Original release
- Network: Channel 4
- Release: 1997 – 2001

The Collector's Lot book to accompany the series

Collectors' Lot is a TV programme produced from 1997 to 2001 by Twofour Broadcast for the United Kingdom's Channel 4. Shown on weekday afternoons, the programme visited every corner of Britain to explore the weird and wonderful things that people choose to collect. The five series of the programme featured over 70 expert craftspeople and restorers at work.

During the height of its popularity the show had 2 million viewers a day, making it "Britain's most successful daytime antiques and collectibles magazine series".

Presenters of Collectors' Lot included Sarah Greene, Sue Cook, Helen Atkinson-Wood and Debbie Thrower.
