= The Swish of the Curtain =

1941 novel by Pamela Brown

- First edition (publ. Thomas Nelson & Sons)
- Author: Pamela Brown
- Publisher: Pushkin Press
- Publication date: June 1, 1943
- ISBN: 978-1-78269-1853

The Swish of the Curtain is a children's novel by British writer Pamela Brown. It was begun in 1938 when the author was 14 but was not published until 1941. The novel has been reprinted many times and has been adapted for television and radio. It was followed by four sequels.

== Plot summary ==
It tells the story of seven young people in three different families who form an amateur theatrical group, the Blue Door Theatre Company. The children write, produce, direct and act in their own plays, each of them harnessing a particular talent. Nigel designs scenery, for example; Jeremy composes music; while Sandra makes costumes. During the course of the book, each of the young people realises a particular ambition. It is "Bulldog", who shines in comic roles, who realises his ambition to create the elusive "swish of the curtain". At the book's climax, the "Blue Doors" enter a drama contest which they have to win in order to be allowed to attend dramatic school to realise their dream of a career in the professional theatre.

== The series ==
Brown wrote four sequels:

- Maddy Alone – 1945
- Golden Pavements – 1947
- Blue Door Venture – 1949
- Maddy Again – 1956

== Publication ==
Until recently The Swish of the Curtain was the only one of the "Blue Doors" series to have been republished after the 1970s. However, The Swish of the Curtain (2006), Maddy Alone (2007), Golden Pavements (2009) and Blue Door Venture (2011) have been republished by Longwater Books, and Maddy Again was finally reprinted in 2012. As this last book in the series was not published for many years, copies of it had previously become very rare and valuable, and very hard to find. Most recently, Pushkin Press have republished all the titles in the Blue Door series.

== Characters ==
- Nigel Halford
- Percy Halford ("Bulldog")
- Victoria Jane Halford ("Vicky")
- Jeremy Darwin
- Lynette Darwin ("Lyn")
- Sandra Fayne
- Madeleine Fayne ("Maddy")

== Film, TV or theatrical adaptations ==
The story was adapted for wireless (radio) and broadcast as a serial during the 1940s.

In 1980, the book was adapted for BBC television. Sarah Greene starred in the production as Sandra Fayne.

In 1994, the book was dramatised for radio by Felicity Hayes-McCoy and broadcast on the old BBC Radio 5, before it became BBC Radio Five Live. For a time this was regularly repeated in the Young Classics Hour on BBC Radio 7. James Lance starred in the production as Jeremy Darwin, and Caroline Harker as Lynette Darwin. Susannah Harker played a smaller role as actress Felicity Warren. A further dramatisation of Golden Pavements, amalgamating material from Maddy Alone, followed later, featuring the same cast.
