= Laura Green =

British epidemiologist

Laura Green OBE FRSB
- Born: Laura Elizabeth Green
- Education: University of Bristol (BSc, PhD); London School of Hygiene and Tropical Medicine
- Scientific career
- Fields: Epidemiology; Animal diseases Microbiology welfare
- Workplaces: University of Warwick; University of Birmingham
- Thesis: A prospective longitudinal study of diseases of lambs in early lambing (housed) flocks (1992)
- Website: www.birmingham.ac.uk/staff/profiles/les/green-laura.aspx

Laura Elizabeth Green OBE FRSB is a British epidemiologist and academic who is Pro-vice-chancellor and Head of the College of Life and Environmental Sciences at the University of Birmingham. She serves on the council of the Biotechnology and Biological Sciences Research Council (BBSRC).

== Early life and education ==
Green studied veterinary medicine at the University of Bristol. She worked briefly as a veterinarian, before starting a Master's degree in epidemiology. She earned her master's degree at the London School of Hygiene & Tropical Medicine. She returned to the University of Bristol for her doctorate, where she studied the diseases of lambs in early lambing flocks.

== Research and career ==
Green joined the University of Warwick in 1999, where she was made a Chair in 2005. Her research considers the endemic diseases of farmed livestock. She has investigated infectious diseases in cattle including Mycobacterium bovis (bovine tuberculosis), sheep (caseous lymphadenitis) and pigs (postweaning multisystemic wasting syndrome). Green studied foot rot in sheep and used her findings to support farmers. She demonstrated that quick treatment with antibiotics can reduce lameness in sheep. Specifically, a single injection of antibiotics helped 95% of sheep. Her findings reduced the prevalence of foot rot by 50%, which is estimated to save the foot sheep industry £2 million a year. She has also investigated how farmers attitudes and personalities impacted their management of livestock. In 2014 Green was appointed Head of the School of Life Sciences. She was made Deputy Pro-Vice Chancellor at the University of Warwick in 2017.

Green joined the University of Birmingham as Pro-Vice-Chancellor and Head of the College of Life and Environmental Sciences in 2018. She serves on the advisory board of the Rural Economy and Land Use Programme.

== Awards and honours ==
- 2013 Royal Agricultural Society of England medal
- 2013 Elected to the council of the Biotechnology and Biological Sciences Research Council (BBSRC)
- 2017 Appointed Order of the British Empire (OBE) in the 2017 Birthday Honours
- 2019 Honorary Life Member of the Society of Veterinary Epidemiology and Preventive Medicine

== Selected publications ==
- Green, L.E.; Hedges, V.J.; Schukken, Y.H.; Blowey, R.W.; Packington, A.J. (2002). "The Impact of Clinical Lameness on the Milk Yield of Dairy Cows". Journal of Dairy Science. 85 (9): 2250–2256. doi:10.3168/jds.s0022-0302(02)74304-x. ISSN 0022-0302. PMID 12362457.
- Whay, H. R.; Main, D. C. J.; Green, L. E.; Webster, A. J. F. (16 August 2003). "Assessment of the welfare of dairy caftle using animal-based measurements: direct observations and investigation of farm records". Veterinary Record. 153 (7): 197–202. doi:10.1136/vr.153.7.197. ISSN 0042-4900. PMID 12956296. S2CID 40615566.*"The Microbial Habitat: An Ecological Perspective". Microbial Ecology. John Wiley & Sons, Inc. 26 September 2011. pp. 103–130. doi:10.1002/9781118015841.ch4. ISBN 978-1-118-01584-1.
