= Pamela Brown (writer) =

British writer (1924–1989)

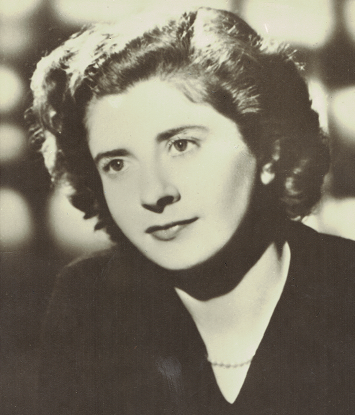
- Born: 31 December 1924
- Died: 1989 (aged 64–65)
- Occupations: Novelist, stage writer, actress and television producer
- Writing career
- Notable work: The Swish of the Curtain (1941)

Pamela Beatrice Brown (December 31, 1924 – 1989) was a British novelist, stage writer, actress and television producer.

== Literary career ==
Pamela Brown was just 13 when she started writing her first book, The Swish of the Curtain, in 1938. A year later, when World War II broke out, she left Colchester County High School, a selective grammar school for girls, and went to live in Wales with her family. She continued with her writing, sending chapters of the book to her friends back in Colchester, Essex, and finally finished the book when she was 16.

The Swish of the Curtain tells the story of seven stage-struck children who form an amateur theatre company in a town called Fenchester, Brown's made-up name for her home town of Colchester. She herself was passionate about the theatre and, from an early age, put on plays with her friends. She went on to write several sequels to her first book, and other children's novels. Her career as an actress and television producer provided her with much detail about early television and life in repertory.

== Stage career ==
With her earnings from The Swish of the Curtain, Brown trained as an actress at the Royal Academy of Dramatic Art. She worked on the professional stage as ‘Mela Brown’, to avoid confusion with another actress of the same name.

== Television career ==
For some years, Pamela Brown produced children's programmes for BBC television. One of her final television appearances was as a guest on Blue Peter alongside the various young actors and actresses who appeared in the television adaptation of The Swish of the Curtain, including Sarah Greene, who was later to be a Blue Peter presenter.

== Works ==
- The Swish of the Curtain (1941) novel
- Maddy Alone (1945) novel
- Golden Pavements (1947) novel
- Blue Door Venture (1949) novel
- The Children of Camp Fortuna (1949) A play in one act for children
- To be a Ballerina, and other stories (1950) short story collection
- Family Playbill (1951) novel
- The Television Twins (1952) novel
- Harlequin Corner (1953) novel
- The Windmill Family (1954) novel
- Louisa (1955) novel
- The Bridesmaids (1956) novel
- Maddy Again (1956) novel
- Back-Stage Portrait (1957)
- Showboat Summer (1957) novel
- Understudy (1958)
- As far as Singapore (1959) novel
- First House (1959) novel
- A Little Universe (1970) novel
- Summer is a Festival (1972) novel
- Looking after Libby (1974) novel
- The Girl who Ran Away (1976) novel
- Every Day is Market Day (1977) novel
- The Finishing School (1984) novel
