= Beno Dorn =

Polish-English master tailor known for providing the Beatles with their first suits

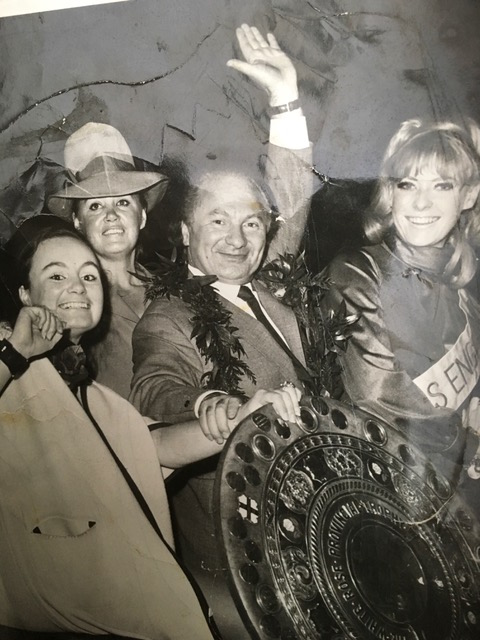
Beno Dorn receiving the White Rose Provincial Shield for "excellence in tailoring" from Miss England, Jennifer Lowe Summers, in May 1968.

Beno Dorn was a Polish-English master tailor known for providing the Beatles with their first suits out of his shop in Birkenhead, England, suits that are often mentioned as part of the rebranding that contributed to their breakthrough in 1962.

== Life and career in England ==
His first shop was at 19a Grange Road West in Birkenhead – now on the Beatles Magic Mystery Tour, because it was here that the Beatles had their very first suits made. In episode one of The Beatles Anthology documentary, Paul McCartney recalls: "We all went quite happily over the water to Wirral, to Beno Dorn, a little tailor who made mohair suits. That started to change the image". Brian Epstein, the Beatles' manager and an old friend of Dorn, has been credited with replacing the group's leather "teddy boy" outfits with mod mohair suits, the subsequent famous collarless suits were produced by Douglas Millings of Old Compton Street, Soho, as part of an image change that led to their breakthrough.

Dorn lived at Gourley Grange, Gourley's Lane in West Kirby until about 1973.

== Later life ==
In about 1973 Dorn moved to Israel with his family. He kept running the tailoring business for a while, despite living abroad, until he retired. In about 1991, during his retirement, Dorn moved to Worthing, West Sussex, to be nearer family in the UK and lived there until he died in the mid-1990s. His ex-wife Joanna passed away on 26 December 2025.
