= Beno Airport =

- IATA: none; ICAO: FZBE

Summary
- Serves: Beno, Democratic Republic of the Congo
- Elevation AMSL: 410 m / 1,345 ft
- Coordinates: 3°36′S 17°47′E

Map
- Location of airport in the Democratic Republic of the Congo
- Source: Great Circle Mapper

Beno Airport (ICAO: FZBE) is an airport serving Beno, Democratic Republic of the Congo.
