= Laura Greene (presenter) =

British meteorologist

- Born: Laura Una Greene; 16 February 1972 (age 54); Fitzrovia, London, England
- Education: University of London
- Occupation: Television presenter
- Years active: 1994–present

Laura Una Greene (born 16 February 1972) is a British former weather presenter and television presenter.

== Early life and career ==
Laura Greene was born at University College Hospital in Fitzrovia, London, the daughter of Welsh DIY expert Harry Greene and English actress Marjie Lawrence. She is sister of presenter Sarah, and made occasional appearances on Blue Peter with her.

== Career ==
After graduating from the University of London with a bachelor's degree in Geography, Greene began her career in 1994 at Britain's ITV network.

In 2002 she became the co-presenter of National Geographic Today, a live one-hour daily news journal on the UK's National Geographic Channel.

Greene has also worked for Carlton TV's London Tonight and Channel 5's 5 News before becoming a reporter and presenter for Meridian Broadcasting's Meridian Tonight.

Greene is a Fellow of the Royal Geographical Society.

She moved to the United States after being offered a job with the National Geographic Channel.

== Personal life ==
Greene met her husband, Peter, after she moved to Washington, D.C., U.S. They have one daughter.
