= Mike Smith (broadcaster) =

English presenter and racing driver (1955–2014)

- Born: Michael George Smith; 23 April 1955; Hornchurch, Essex, England
- Died: 1 August 2014 (aged 59); Harefield, Greater London, England
- Occupations: Television and radio presenter; racing driver; pilot; businessman
- Known for: Television and radio presenter
- Spouse: Sarah Greene (m. 1989)

Michael George Smith (23 April 1955 – 1 August 2014), also known by the on-air nickname of Smitty, was an English television and radio presenter, racing driver and businessman. During the 1980s, he was known for his appearances on BBC1 as a co-host of Breakfast Time and the music show Top of the Pops.

Smith died on 1 August 2014 from complications of heart failure following major heart surgery.

== Early life ==
Smith was born in Hornchurch, Essex. He attended Ballyholme Primary School in Bangor, Northern Ireland during the early 1960s due to his father being relocated to Belfast by his employer, the Ford Motor Company.

Smith's earliest ambition was to be a train driver, however after spending a short period at Bangor Grammar School, Smith attended King Edward VI Grammar School, Chelmsford, where he found he enjoyed being a DJ, first at the school's Friday night sixth form disco. Upon leaving school before taking his A-levels, he failed to get the motor industry job his father had hoped for.

== Radio career ==
Smith began his broadcasting career at Chelmsford Hospital radio, before joining BBC Radio 1 in 1975 as a freelance producer and presenter. His work included promotions and production work for the Radio 1 Roadshow, Quiz Kid and most daytime network shows. As a standby DJ, Smith occasionally broadcast when live outside broadcasts failed. He joined London's Capital Radio in June 1978 and presented a variety of shows until July 1980, when he became the breakfast show presenter. He moved back to BBC Radio 1 in 1982, presenting the weekday early show from 6 to 7 am and a Saturday-morning show.

In 1983, Smith took over the weekday lunchtime show (11.30 am to 2 pm) until March 1984, when he briefly left to present BBC Breakfast Time. He returned to Radio 1 on 5 May 1986, taking over from Mike Read on The Radio 1 Breakfast Show from 7.00 to 9.30 am, where he remained until almost exactly two years later when he left Radio 1 on 17 May 1988.

During his time on The Radio 1 Breakfast Show, Diana, Princess of Wales, declared him her favourite DJ.

== Television career ==
Smith's career as a television presenter included Thames TV's CBTV, BBC1 entertainment magazine and music chart shows Top of the Pops (1982–1988) Show Business (1983) and Friday People (1985–87), Noel Edmonds' The Late, Late Breakfast Show (1984–86), That's Showbusiness (1989–96), and Julian Clary's Trick or Treat for ITV.

Smith was one of BBC TV's main presenters at Live Aid in 1985.

Smith presented BBC TV's Railwatch, which was broadcast live for five days in February 1989. Other large outside broadcasts included Hospital Watch, Airport Watch and the BBC coverage of the Royal Tournament.

Smith decided not to sign the licensing agreement that would allow the BBC to repeat his episodes of Top of the Pops, with the BBC continuing to respect his wishes following his death. Episodes featuring Smith are thus not included in the repeat run on BBC Four.

== Pilot ==
Smith was a qualified helicopter pilot. He and his partner, later his wife, Sarah Greene, were both injured on 10 September 1988 when the Robinson R22 Beta helicopter he was piloting (bearing the personal registration G-SMIF) crashed in Gloucestershire. Smith reported apparent unrecoverable loss of engine power whilst circling to reconnoitre an unfamiliar landing site. Both pilot and passenger survived, although Greene broke both legs and an arm, and Smith suffered a broken back and ankle.

The Air Accidents Investigation Branch neither criticised nor exonerated Smith in relation to the crash (it being beyond its remit to do so), concluding simply that "examination of the helicopter [including flight control, fuel, engine control, dynamic systems and the engine itself] revealed no failure or unserviceability that could have resulted in a loss of rotor speed."

== Aerial filming company ==
In 2004, Smith founded Flying TV, a company providing aerial filming services to broadcasters. As well as being managing director, Smith often acted as an aerial cameraman.

== Motor racing ==
Driving from the age of eight, Smith raced at the age of 14 in grass track events, building his own cars. In 1972, aged 17, he passed his test and took up motorsports in racing, rallying and rallycross. In 1976, he progressed to Formula Ford 2000 with the Patrick Head-designed Sark. Smith was also a motorsport commentator, mainly at Brands Hatch where he also, age 21, ran the marketing operation. It was during this time he became interested in broadcasting.

While still broadcasting, Smith raced in several British Touring Car Championship races, driving a newly homologated Sierra Cosworth in 1987, and then alongside Frank Sytner in 1988 in a BMW M3. He also won the Willhire 24 Hour at Snetterton in 1986, co-driving a Ford Escort RS Turbo with Robb Gravett.

In 1989, Smith established a BTCC team known as Trakstar with Gravett and Malcolm Swetnam. They ran two Sierra Cosworths, which had been imported from the Australian Touring Car stable of Dick Johnson. Gravett went on to become runner up in Group A, but Smith struggled with his recovery from the helicopter crash. However, loss of a major sponsor in 1990 meant that only one car could be run, which was raced by Gravett who became champion. Smith never raced competitively again.

== Racing record ==
=== Complete European Touring Car Championship results ===
(key) (Races in bold indicate pole position) (Races in italics indicate fastest lap)

Year	Team	Car	1	2	3	4	5	6	7	8	9	10	11	12	DC	Pts
1984	(United Kingdom) **Terry Drury Racing**	Alfa Romeo GTV6	MNZ	VAL	DON	PER	BRN	ZEL	SAL	NUR	SPA	SIL; 22†	ZOL	MUG	NC	0
1988	(United Kingdom) **BMW Finance Racing**	BMW M3	MNZ	DON; 2/3†	EST	JAR	DIJ	VAL	NÜR	SPA	ZOL	SIL; 13†/Ret	NOG		NC	0

† Not eligible for points.

=== Complete British Saloon / Touring Car Championship results ===
(key) Races in bold indicate pole position. Races in italics indicate fastest lap (1 point awarded – 1987–1989 in class)

Year	Team	Car	Class	1	2	3	4	5	6	7	8	9	10	11	12	13	Overall Pos	Pts	Class Pos
1985	Ilford Photo	Ford Escort RS Turbo	B	SIL	OUL	THR	DON	THR	SIL	DON	SIL ovr:17 cls:7	SNE	BRH	BRH; Ret	SIL		NC	0	NC
1987	Abbott Racing	Ford Sierra RS Cosworth	A	SIL	OUL	THR	THR	SIL	SIL; Ret	BRH	SNE	DON	OUL	DON	SIL		NC	0	NC
1987	Prodrive	BMW M3	B	SIL	OUL	THR	THR	SIL	SIL	BRH	SNE	DON	**OUL**; Ret†	DON	SIL		NC	0	NC
1988	BMW Finance Racing with Mobil 1	BMW M3	B	SIL ovr:5 cls:2	OUL ovr:14 cls:4	THR ovr:6 cls:2	DON; Ret	THR ovr:14 cls:4	SIL ovr:12 cls:2	SIL; Ret	BRH ovr:8 cls:2	SNE ovr:19 cls:4	BRH ovr:12 cls:4	BIR; C	DON	SIL	5th	40	**3rd**
1989	Trakstar Motorsport	Ford Sierra RS500	A	OUL ovr:7 cls:6	SIL ovr:10 cls:10	THR ovr:10 cls:7	DON; Ret	THR ovr:5 cls:5	SIL ovr:4 cls:4	SIL ovr:10 cls:10	BRH ovr:3 cls:3	SNE	BRH; Ret	BIR; Ret	DON ovr:9 cls:9	SIL ovr:7 cls:7	27th	10	7th
1990	Trakstar Motorsport	Ford Sierra RS500	A	OUL; Ret	DON; Ret†	THR	SIL	OUL	SIL ovr:6 cls:6	BRH ovr:1† cls:1†	SNE	BRH	BIR	DON	THR	SIL ovr:5 cls:5	25th	14	9th

† Endurance driver (Ineligible for points)

=== Complete World Touring Car Championship results ===
(key) (Races in bold indicate pole position) (Races in italics indicate fastest lap)

Year	Team	Car	1	2	3	4	5	6	7	8	9	10	11	DC	Pts
1987	(United Kingdom) Prodrive	BMW M3	MNZ	JAR	DIJ	NÜR	SPA	BNO	SIL ovr:7 cls:6†	BAT	CLD	WEL	FJI	NC	0

† Not eligible for points.

== Personal life ==
Smith married Sarah Greene in 1989, soon after their 1988 helicopter crash.

Smith died on 1 August 2014 from complications following major heart surgery. Greene survived him.

Media offices
Preceded by Mike Read	BBC Radio 1 Breakfast Show Presenter; 1986–1988	Succeeded by Simon Mayo
