= Twelve Inches =

Remix album by Frankie Goes to Hollywood
- Released: 16 August 2001
- Genre: New wave; dance
- Label: ZTT – ZTT 176 CD
- Producer: Trevor Horn; Stephen Lipson

Frankie Goes to Hollywood chronology
The Club Mixes 2000 (2000)	Twelve Inches (2001)	Rage Hard: The Sonic Collection (2001)

Professional ratings
Review scores
Source	Rating
AllMusic	3/5 stars

Twelve Inches is a compilation album by Frankie Goes to Hollywood, featuring many remixes that had previously only been available in their original twelve-inch format.

The track listing for the German CD (originally released by Repertoire) differs from the one released in other territories.

The tracks have been remastered considerably louder as compared to the originals.

== Track listing ==
=== CD: ZTT / ZTT 176 CD United Kingdom ===
CD 1

1. "Relax" (Sex Mix) – 16:24
2. "Two Tribes" (Hibakusha Mix) – 6:37
3. "Welcome to the Pleasuredome" (Fruitness Mix) – 12:14
4. "Rage Hard" (Stamped) – 4:59
5. "(Don't Lose What's Left) Of Your Little Mind" – 4:15
6. "Watching the Wildlife" (Die Letzten Tage Der Menschheit) – 10:15
7. "Warriors of the Wasteland" (Attack Mix featuring Gary Moore) – 6:32
8. "War" (Hidden) – 8:34
9. "Rage Hard" (Freddie Bastone Mix) – 7:01

CD 2

1. "Welcome to the Pleasuredome" (Escape Act Video Mix) – 5:12
2. "Warriors of the Wasteland" (Attack Full Mix) – 9:56
3. "Two Tribes" (808 State Mix) – 5:09
4. "Disneyland" – 3:07
5. "Rage Hard" (Broad) – 8:42
6. "Watching the Wildlife" (Hotter) – 9:08
7. "Warriors of the Wasteland" (Turn of the Knife) – 8:10
8. "Power of Love '93" (Alternative Mix) – 5:10
9. "Relax" (Peter Rauhofers Doomsday Club Mix) – 10:17

=== CD: Repertoire / REP 4952 Germany ===
CD 1

1. "Warriors of the Wasteland" (Attack Mix featuring Gary Moore) – 6:32
2. "Relax" (New York Mix) – 7:22
3. "Two Tribes" (808 State Mix) – 5:09
4. "Welcome to the Pleasuredome" (Fruitness Mix) – 12:14
5. "Rage Hard" (Stamped) – 4:59
6. "Warriors of the Wasteland" (Attack Full Mix) – 9:56
7. "Watching the Wildlife" (Die Letzten Tage Der Menschheit) – 10:15
8. "War" (Hidden) – 8:34
9. "Disneyland" – 3:07

CD 2

1. "Warriors of the Wasteland" (Turn of the Knife) – 8:10
2. "Two Tribes" (Video Destructo) – 6:11
3. "Welcome to the Pleasuredome" (Escape Act Video Mix) – 5:12
4. "Rage Hard" (Freddie Bastone Mix) – 7:01
5. "Power of Love '93" (Alternative Mix) – 5:10
6. "Relax" (Sex Mix) – 16:24
7. "Watching the Wildlife" (Hotter) – 9:08
8. "Rage Hard" (Broad) – 8:42
9. "Two Tribes" (Hibakusha Mix) – 6:37

"Two Tribes" (Video Destructo) is currently unavailable on any other official release.
