= Bang! (1985 Frankie Goes to Hollywood album) =

Compilation album by Frankie Goes to Hollywood
- Released: 1985
- Recorded: 1983–1984
- Genres: Pop; rock
- Length: 40:21
- Labels: ZTT; Island; Polystar
- Producer: Trevor Horn

Frankie Goes to Hollywood chronology
Welcome to the Pleasuredome (1984)	Bang! (1985)	Liverpool (1986)

Bang! is a Japan-exclusive compilation album by Frankie Goes to Hollywood released in 1985. It contains several remixes of singles that were difficult to find at the time of the album's release. In particular, the "Hibakusha" mix of "Two Tribes" was originally released as a 12" record with only 5,000 copies pressed, making this album the only other way to obtain the track until the 1995 CD reissue of "Two Tribes".

== Track listing ==
All songs written by Peter Gill, Holly Johnson, Brian Nash and Mark O'Toole, unless otherwise noted.

1. "War" (Hidden) (Barrett Strong, Norman Whitfield) – 8:37
2. "Relax" (U.S. Mix) (Gill, Johnson, O'Toole) – 7:20
3. "Black Night White Light" – 4:08
4. "Welcome to the Pleasuredome" (Urban Mix) – 8:08
5. "Two Tribes" (Hibakusha) (Gill, Johnson, O'Toole) – 6:38
6. "The Power of Love" – 5:30

=== Notes ===
- "War (Hidden)" and "Two Tribes (Hibakusha)" can also be found on Twelve Inches.
- "Black Night White Light" and "The Power of Love" are the common album versions from Welcome to the Pleasuredome.
- "Relax" (US Mix) saw its first CD releases on this album, but can now also be found on other compilations.
- "Welcome to the Pleasuredome" (Urban Mix) remains exclusive for this release.
