= Rage Hard =

1986 single by Frankie Goes to Hollywood

Single by Frankie Goes to Hollywood

from the album Liverpool
- B-side: "(Don't Lose What's Left) Of Your Little Mind"; "SuffRAGEtte City"; "Roadhouse Blues"
- Released: 25 August 1986
- Genre: Art rock
- Length: 5:05 (album version); 4:11 (7-inch version)
- Label: ZTT
- Songwriters: Peter Gill; Holly Johnson; Brian Nash; Mark O'Toole
- Producer: Stephen Lipson

Frankie Goes to Hollywood singles chronology
"Welcome to the Pleasuredome" (1985)	"Rage Hard" (1986)	"Warriors of the Wasteland" (1986)

Music video
- "Rage Hard" on YouTube

"Rage Hard" is a song by English pop band Frankie Goes to Hollywood. It was released on 25 August 1986 as the first single from their second album, Liverpool. The song reached number four in the UK Singles Chart and number one in West Germany.

== Background ==
"Rage Hard" (Freddie Bastone mix)
An excerpt from "Rage Hard" (Freddie Bastone mix).

Having topped the charts around the world with Welcome to the Pleasuredome and its accompanying singles, Frankie Goes to Hollywood took off to Amsterdam to record the follow-up album, Liverpool. Taking on a rockier edge, "Rage Hard" was the first single culled from the album.

In a 1986 interview, singer Holly Johnson was asked about the meaning of the song explaining, "Have you read the poem 'Do Not Go Gently Into That Good Night' by Dylan Thomas? It was kind of inspired by that. It's an incantation against death and lethargy, and it's supposed to encourage lots of creative idealism in the listener." He added to Sounds, "It's saying: don't die quietly, resist the greyness surrounding us at the moment."

Not only was it the first Frankie single to be featured on CD single, it was also the first single to not feature a cassette release—new rules limited the number of items that could count towards the official charts, following the earlier ZTT excesses. "Rage Hard" eventually reached number four on the UK Singles Chart and number one in West Germany for two weeks, number five in Switzerland, number seven in the Netherlands, number 12 in Austria, number 19 in Sweden and number 32 in France.

== Critical reception ==
Upon its release, Neil Spencer of Sounds called "Rage Hard" "great", "huge", "catchy" and "superbly understated", although "scarcely credible". He also noted the 12-inch version "boasts an array of spot-on fun witticisms". Ro Newton of Smash Hits compared the single unfavorably with their previous releases as, "watered-down and without the guts. The over all effect is a bit limp and very disappointing." In the US, Billboard praised the band's performance calling "the matured Frankie socks out weight art-rock best suited to AOR/ alternative radio."

== B-sides ==
The original B-side is an odd composition entitled "(Don't Lose What's Left) Of Your Little Mind". It was released in two versions—a 4-minute mix and a 6-minute mix—and featured Holly Johnson and Brian Nash imitating Count von Count ("Ha ha ha/I am the Count") from the children's TV show Sesame Street. This was complemented by sampled burps and belches over a backing track.

For the 12-inch single to "Rage Hard" were covers of David Bowie's "Suffragette City", stylized as "SuffRAGEtte City" to fit in with the "Rage Hard" promotion and the second cover song was the Doors' "Roadhouse Blues." A shorter version features on the CD single.

== Track listings ==
7-inch: ZTT / ZTAS 22 United Kingdom

1. "Rage Hard" (7-inch mix) – 5:05
2. "(Don't Lose What's Left) Of Your Little Mind" – 4:03
- The standard release features all five coloured fists on the cover.
- 20,000 copies in a pop-up gatefold sleeve (with the "Rage Hard" fists being the pop-up), featuring the orange fist (ZTD22).

7-inch: ZTT / ZTAX 22 United Kingdom

1. "Rage Hard" (stamped) – 4:55
2. "(Don't Lose What's Left) Of Your Little Mind" – 4:03
- "Stamped" is an edit of the "Broad" mix from the second 12-inch (sleeve featuring the blue fist).
- Released to celebrate the song entering #6 on the UK charts on 6 September 1986.

All "Rage Hard" releases

12-inch: ZTT / 12 ZTAS 22 United Kingdom

1. "Rage Hard" (The Young Person's Guide to the 12" mix) – 12:08
2. "[The B-side]" + "SuffRAGEtte City" (David Bowie) – 3:31
3. "(Don't Lose What's Left) Of Your Little Mind" – 6:15
4. "['always note the sequencer...']" – 0:22
- An edit (10:05) of track 1 is also known as "Young Person's Guide into the 12-inch".
- This 12-inch was also released with a 12"x24" poster (12 ZTAQ 22), limited to 20,000 copies.
- Also released on German CD (Island / 658 434).

12-inch: ZTT / 12 ZTAX 22 United Kingdom

1. "Rage Hard" (broad mix) – 8:36
2. "Roadhouse Blues" – 4:03
3. "(Don't Lose What's Left) Of Your Little Mind" – 6:15
4. "['always note the sequencer...']" – 0:22
- Sleeve featuring the yellow fist.
- This release also came in a limited edition cardboard box which was designed to contain the complete set of "Rage Hard" UK releases. The front of the box lists the relevant catalogue numbers of the intended contents, minus the "Stamped" mix 7-inch single which is not listed. The box, called "The Total" had a sticker which made it clear that only 12 ZTAX 22 was included. It is still not established whether any box sets with their intended contents were ever officially released or indeed sold by record stores, but it's highly likely that some stores sold a complete set on request, if not officially.
- The "Broad" mix is also known as "Rage Hard ⊕⊕".
- Track 2 is labelled as "Broadhouse Blues" on the sleeve.
- Track 3 is labelled as "(Don't Loose What's Left) Of Your Little Mind" on the front sleeve.

CD: ZTT / CD ZCID 22 United Kingdom

1. "Rage Hard (⊕⊕⊕✪)" – 17:12
2. "SuffRAGEtte City" – 3:31
3. "["Don't lose what's left.."]" + "Roadhouse Blues" (compacted) – 3:54
- Sleeve featuring the purple fist.
- "⊕⊕⊕✪" is a combined edit of "Stamped", "The Young Person's Guide to the 12"" and "Broad".

Tracks 1 and 3.1 were re-released on the Sexmix compilation in 2012.

== 1993 version ==
A version of the song appeared as a B-side of "The Power of Love" reissue (FGTH 3), entitled the "original DJ mix". This version is the original 7-inch mix from 1986, but with the first chorus removed. Instead, the first verse and second verse are jointed together. This release can also be found on a large centre hole 7-inch disc with the label details stamped into the naked vinyl, as opposed to a paper or printed label.

== Charts ==
=== Weekly charts ===
Chart (1986)	Peak position
Australia (Kent Music Report)	45
Austria (Ö3 Austria Top 40)	12
Belgium (Ultratop 50 Flanders)	7
Canada Top Singles (RPM)	82
Finland (Suomen virallinen lista)	2
France (IFOP)	21
Ireland (IRMA)	2
Italy (Musica e dischi)	3
Netherlands (Dutch Top 40)	7
Netherlands (Single Top 100)	6
New Zealand (Recorded Music NZ)	12
Norway (VG-lista)	8
Spain (AFYVE)	23
Sweden (Sverigetopplistan)	19
Switzerland (Schweizer Hitparade)	5
UK Singles (Official Charts)	4
US 12-inch Singles Sales (Billboard)	42
West Germany (GfK)	1

=== Year-end charts ===
Chart (1986)	Position
Netherlands (Dutch Top 40)	65
Netherlands (Single Top 100)	29
Switzerland (Schweizer Hitparade)	23
UK Singles (OCC)	77
West Germany (Media Control)	15
