= Lo Cole =

British illustrator, printmaker and author

- Born: England
- Education: University of Kent
- Notable work: Welcome to the Pleasuredome
- Style: Screen printing, illustration
- Website: locole.co.uk

Lo Cole is a British illustrator, printmaker and author.

Cole is former student of the University of Kent and graduated with a degree in fine art from the Maidstone College of Art after finishing a foundation course at London's St Martin's School of Art.

Cole's artwork has been featured in a number publications including The Economist, The Guardian and The New Republic.

== Author ==
Cole is a children's books author known for such titles as We Want a Dog and Doris.

== Welcome to the Pleasuredome ==
In 1984 Cole was hired by ZTT, a record company, to illustrate the cover for the debut album of the British band Frankie Goes to Hollywood entitled Welcome to the Pleasuredome.

In 2023, Cole's original artwork for Welcome to the Pleasuredome sold for £17,000 at auction.

The double album artwork for Pleasuredome has been described as "Equally near-the-knuckle – the gatefold showing a large phallus and the back image a selection of mating animals which had to have fig leaves attached after the printing company refused to print it."

== Reviews ==
The Wall Street Journal said about Cole's children's novel Doris "In its topic and in the heft of its heroine, “Doris” brings to mind Roger Duvoisin’s 1961 picture book “Veronica,” about a hippo who, unlike Doris, yearns for nothing so much as to be conspicuous."
