= Liverpool (album) =

Studio album by Frankie Goes to Hollywood
- Released: 20 October 1986
- Recorded: November 1985 – June 1986
- Studios: Wisseloord (Amsterdam); Sarm West (London)
- Genre: Pop rock
- Length: 43:43
- Label: ZTT
- Producer: Stephen Lipson

Frankie Goes to Hollywood chronology
Bang! (1985)	Liverpool (1986)	Bang!... The Greatest Hits of Frankie Goes to Hollywood (1993)

Singles from Liverpool
- 1. "Rage Hard" Released: 25 August 1986; 2. "Warriors of the Wasteland" Released: 10 November 1986; 3. "Watching the Wildlife" Released: 23 February 1987

Professional ratings
Review scores
Source	Rating
AllMusic	2.5/5 stars
The Encyclopedia of Popular Music	2/5 stars
Record Mirror	3/5 stars
The Rolling Stone Album Guide	.5/5 stars
Sounds	1.5/5 stars
Spin Alternative Record Guide	1/10

Liverpool is the second and final studio album by British band Frankie Goes to Hollywood, released in October 1986. Produced by Stephen Lipson and mixed by Trevor Horn, the album showcases a Pop rock sound in contrast to the synth dance tone found in its predecessor, Welcome to the Pleasuredome. The recording sessions would be marred by the radical change in musical direction creating tension within the band.

The album received mixed reviews from critics and was a commercial disappointment compared to its predecessor, but it charted at number 5 in the United Kingdom and was a modest success in other countries. It would be supported by the lead single “Rage Hard”, a UK number 4 and number 1 in Germany. Liverpool would be the band's final album as lead singer Holly Johnson would leave the band followed by a flurry of lawsuits from ZTT.

== Recording ==
Johnson was distant from the band during the sessions and was unhappy about the album's focus on rock over dance. Jill Sinclair, Horn's wife and one of the ZTT founders, later alleged that Johnson had been uncooperative and absent for most of the sessions. According to Nash, Johnson was preoccupied with the serious illness of Wolfgang Kuhle, then Johnson's boyfriend, but he did not tell the band. Johnson's distancing and disinterest came to the point that the band members concluded he was "finished and were in the market for a new singer". They invited Duran Duran singer Simon Le Bon but he declined, Pete Wylie was also approached, but Johnson eventually remained with the band and completed Liverpool. The session studio recordings were made in Ibiza, Holland and London.

The album's production was handled by Trevor Horn's engineer Stephen Lipson, who urged the band to play their own instruments on this album (Horn having replaced many of the band's performances and arrangements with his session musicians or his own performances on Welcome to the Pleasuredome). Lipson followed a laborious method of compiling the band's performances via two 24-track Sony digital recorders, where different elements were transferred between 24-track tapes via offsets to create new versions. Via this method, the song arrangements and structure could also be fine-tuned on tape as they went along, accumulating over 50 different multitrack versions of "Rage Hard", for example. Basic tracks were cut at Wisseloord Studios over eight weeks, with keyboard overdubs & final mixes at Sarm West in London. Synclavier programming was also done with Lipson, albeit to a lesser extent than the previous album.

According to Nash, the band was given contradicting information, with Horn considered as a producer or executive producer. According to drummer Peter Gill, Horn had a less hands-on role, screening through the material and advising on changes to the songs via Lipson as they cut the basic tracks. In the end Horn took over mixing it on which "spent a whopping £500,000 (making £840,000 in all) tidying it up". The band was so much in debt that they had to sell at least a million copies to start earning "a penny".

== Music ==
Liverpool features a more hard rock and heavy metal sound than its predecessor. In a 1986 interview with Sounds, Johnson said, "I describe 'Liverpool' as removing the rose-tinted spectacles of Welcome to the Pleasuredome. It's a more mature record and a more serious record, but it's a case of like it or lump it, you know?" Frankie Goes to Hollywood have not released any more studio albums since Liverpool. The cover photo was different depending on what format was purchased (LP, cassette, or compact disc).

== Release ==
The album was a commercial disappointment compared to the band's previous effort, though it charted generally high at No. 5 in the United Kingdom and Germany, No. 7 on the Austrian and Swiss music charts and No. 8 in Norway. It produced the top 5 single "Rage Hard" (No. 1 in Germany), top 20 single "Warriors of the Wasteland" and top 30 single "Watching the Wildlife". By March 1988, the album had sold around 800,000 copies. On 20 June 2011 was released a 2xCD reissue including session recordings, mixes and covers of David Bowie, the Doors and Rolling Stones.

== Critical reception ==
In the 80s and 90s the album received poor critical reception. The Rolling Stone Album Guide wrote: "Like most of the era's one-hit wonders, the group did make a second album, though God only knows why anyone would want to hear it."

Alex S. Garcia writing 2.5/5 review for AllMusic considered that "on many accounts, Liverpool can be considered as an improvement over its predecessor", that being shorter duration and almost the same quality of all songs, and "the production is impeccable ... worth a listen if you like the band or have an interest for 80s music—of which this is not such a bad sample".

Paul Lester in BBC review of 2011 reissue noted how "many of the [original] tracks are straight hard rock/metal, with the lavish sonics and orchestral pomp typical of the ZTT label dropped on top", and that the reissue is "a superb repackage of what remains one of the great anticlimaxes in pop". Lester compared the original album to the similar "climb-down" records ABC's Beauty Stab (1983) and Simple Minds' Sparkle in the Rain (1984), "those other early-80s albums where the bands in question retreated from studio opulence towards a more 'authentic' approach that proved they could reproduce the music live; that they were Proper Rock Bands."

Steve Howe, who played on the album, said in a 2023 interview, "I just was hoping so much that Liverpool [...] would [...] make a meaningful dent in the [...] success of the band because it was just great."

== Track listing ==
All tracks are written by Peter Gill, Holly Johnson, Brian Nash and Mark O'Toole.

No.	Title	Length
1.	"Warriors of the Wasteland"	4:53
2.	"Rage Hard"	5:08
3.	"Kill the Pain"	6:16
4.	"Maximum Joy"	5:32
5.	"Watching the Wildlife"	4:18
6.	"Lunar Bay"	5:42
7.	"For Heaven's Sake"	4:29
8.	"Is Anybody Out There?"	7:25

== Personnel ==
Frankie Goes to Hollywood

- Holly Johnson – lead vocals
- Paul Rutherford – backing vocals
- Brian Nash – guitar
- Mark O'Toole – bass guitar
- Peter Gill – drums

Additional personnel

- Trevor Horn – executive producer
- Betsy Cook – backing vocals
- Barry Diament – mastering
- Stephen Lipson – guitar, keyboards, producer
- Steve Howe, Trevor Rabin – guitar
- Heff Moraes – assistant engineer
- Richard Niles – string arrangements, brass arrangement
- Andy Richards, Peter-John Vettese – keyboards
- Anton Corbijn – photography

== Charts ==
=== Weekly charts ===
Weekly chart performance for Liverpool
Chart (1986)	Peak position
Australian Albums (Kent Music Report)	72
Austrian Albums (Ö3 Austria)	7
Canada Top Albums/CDs (RPM)	72
Dutch Albums (Album Top 100)	5
European Albums (Music & Media)	4
Finnish Albums (Suomen virallinen lista)	21
Icelandic Albums (Tónlist)	1
German Albums (Offizielle Top 100)	5
New Zealand Albums (RMNZ)	12
Norwegian Albums (VG-lista)	8
Swedish Albums (Sverigetopplistan)	13
Swiss Albums (Schweizer Hitparade)	7
UK Albums (Official Charts)	5
US Billboard 200	88

=== Monthly charts ===
Monthly chart performance for Liverpool
Chart (1989)	Peak position
Soviet Albums (Moskovskij Komsomolets)	4

=== Year-end charts ===
1986 year-end chart performance for Liverpool
Chart (1986)	Position
Dutch Albums (Album Top 100)	92
European Albums (Music & Media)	92

1987 year-end chart performance for Liverpool
Chart (1987)	Position
European Albums (Music & Media)	97
German Albums (Offizielle Top 100)	52

== Certifications ==
Certifications for Liverpool
Region	Certification	Certified units/sales
France (SNEP)	Gold	100,000^{*}
Germany (BVMI)	Gold	250,000^{^}
New Zealand (RMNZ)	Gold	7,500^{^}
United Kingdom (BPI)	Gold	100,000^{^}
^{*} Sales figures based on certification alone.^{^} Shipments figures based on certification alone.
