= Welcome to the Pleasuredome (song) =

1985 single by Frankie Goes to Hollywood

Single by Frankie Goes to Hollywood

from the album Welcome to the Pleasuredome
- B-side: "Get It On"; "Happy Hi!"
- Released: 18 March 1985
- Length: 13:38 (album version); 4:20 (7-inch version)
- Label: ZTT
- Songwriters: Peter Gill; Holly Johnson; Mark O'Toole; Brian Nash
- Producer: Trevor Horn

Frankie Goes to Hollywood singles chronology
"The Power of Love" (1984)	"Welcome to the Pleasuredome" (1985)	"Rage Hard" (1986)

Music video
- "Welcome to the Pleasuredome" on YouTube

"Welcome to the Pleasuredome" is a song by the English pop band Frankie Goes to Hollywood, released on their 1984 debut album, "Welcome to the Pleasuredome". The lyrics were inspired by the poem Kubla Khan by Samuel Taylor Coleridge. In March 1985, it was abridged and remixed for release as the group's fourth UK single.

While criticised at the time of release and afterward for being a song that glorifies debauchery, the lyrics (and video), in accordance with Coleridge's poem, were about the dangers of mindless indulgence. This song, along with "Relax", made Frankie Goes to Hollywood even more controversial than they already were.

Billboard compared it to "Relax", saying that "Welcome to the Pleasuredome" had "less hook, less controversy, more drama."

== Recording ==
"Welcome to the Pleasuredome" was developed over the course of three months. The song was written around a bass riff by Mark O'Toole, who was the main songwriter of the band, then Brian Nash and Peter Gill contributed to finish the track along with him. Initially, the song had a duration of three minutes, which was later extended beyond thirteen minutes by overlapping different sections and lengthening other passages. When working on the song, Stephen Lipson brought in multiple tape machines to offset the recordings by eight bars, which he explained to Sound on Sound.

That song was quite interesting because I had the idea of getting another tape machine in," says Lipson. "It suddenly occurred to me, if you could make digital copies, you could offset. I had no idea what I was talking about, but I did an offset so that, where the song ended, I had it start again, and when I demonstrated this to Trevor he absolutely flipped out. It was a remarkable thing. The concept of offsets freaked us out. Nobody had ever considered doing anything like this, and all of a sudden we were sort of inventing a recording equivalent of the wheel. It was like a super-sampler.

— Stephen Lipson

Lipson described the song as having "vast expanses of music" that were filled in by various instruments and sound effects. During one recording session, Trevor Horn dangled a Neumann U 87 out a window to capture the sounds of cans and bottles being swept up from the Notting Hill Carnival. A few guitar tracks were also recorded for the song, one of which was overdubbed by Steve Howe, who according to Lipson, overdubbed "few funny chords" on an acoustic guitar that "no one else could get their heads around." Horn also took audio from Lipson demonstrating a potential solo on a Fender Stratocaster, which unbeknownst to Lipson had been captured on tape by Horn.

== Original 1985 single ==
"Welcome to the Pleasuredome" (The Alternative)
An excerpt from "Welcome to the Pleasuredome" (The Alternative).

Despite the group's record label (ZTT) pre-emptively promoting the single as "their fourth number one", an achievement that would have set a new UK record for consecutive number one singles by a debuting artist, "Welcome to the Pleasuredome" peaked at number two on the UK Singles Chart, being kept off the top spot by the Phil Collins/Philip Bailey duet "Easy Lover". The single spent a total of eleven weeks on the UK chart.

It was the first release by the group not to reach number one and, despite representing a creditable success in its own right, it symbolically confirmed the end of the chart invincibility that the group had enjoyed during 1984. Frankie Goes to Hollywood would not release another record for seventeen months, and they would fail to emulate their past chart success upon their return.

The spoken-word introductions to both 12-inch mixes are adapted from Walter Kaufmann's 1967 translation of Friedrich Nietzsche's The Birth of Tragedy. The recitation on the first 12-inch/cassette single ("Real Altered") is by Gary Taylor, whilst that on the second 12-inch ("Fruitness") is by actor Geoffrey Palmer. It is unknown whether Palmer's concluding "Welcome to the Pleasuredrome" was a genuine mistake or a deliberately scripted one.

This is the only single from the group that was not released on a CD single at that time. "Relax", "Two Tribes", "The Power of Love" and "Rage Hard+" all saw a CD-maxi release in Germany at the end of the '80s. "Welcome to the Pleasuredome" was not given such a release. However, the 7-inch vinyl single was released in two different mixes, and it was purely random as to which one you ended up with, as both mixes were in identical sleeve designs and carried the same catalogue number. Not only that, but the subtitle used to identify different mixes was identical on both record labels, with only the matrix number on the run out groove giving the game away. The first 7-inch (matrix 7 A 1 U) carried the normal 7-inch single mix, which was guitar driven. However, the "secret" alternative mix (matrix 7 A 7 U or 7 A 8 U) was quite different, and featured on the apple-shaped picture disc. The subtitle for that disc was 'alternative reel' but on the 7-inch single the subtitle remained unchanged as 'altered real'.

== B-sides ==
All releases featured an edited version of "Get It On", originally recorded for a BBC Radio 1 session in 1983 (a full-length version was included on the cassette release), plus a faded or full length version of "Happy Hi!", a non-album track.

Both "Relax (International)" and "Born to Run" are live recordings (with some minor overdubs), based on an actual live appearance on The Tube's "Europe A-Go-Go" in Newcastle during early January 1985.

== Music video ==
The music video for "Welcome to the Pleasuredome" was directed by Bernard Rose. It features the group stealing a car whilst Holly is flying in a helicopter chasing them, going to a carnival and encountering all manner of deceptively "pleasureable" activities. The audio soundtrack of the video was included as part of the cassette single.

Three edits were made, the regular 4:55 version with the regular 7-inch mix, a 5:45 version matching what was included on the cassette single and a 7:52 version with a longer, different intro.

== Promotional releases ==
In 1984, a lengthy, mostly instrumental version of the album track was issued as a promotional 12-inch single, entitled "Welcome to the Pleasuredome (Pleasure Fix)", along with a similar early instrumental of "The Only Star in Heaven" (subtitled "Star Fix"). These tracks were subsequently given wider release as part of the B-side to the second 12-inch of "The Power of Love" single.

"Welcome to the Pleasuredome" was also used on several promotional records in the USA during 1985, featuring the following tracks in various combinations:

- The second UK 7-inch mix of the track ("Alternative Reel"), labelled "Trevor Horn Re-mix Edit".
- An edited version of the album track created by the Sacramento radio station KZAP, and known as "Welcome to the Pleasuredome (KZAP Edit)" (6:22)
- A version of the second UK 7-inch mix ("Alternative Reel") with a new introduction added, and known as "Welcome to the Pleasuredome (Urban Mix)" (8:08). This is on the Bang! Japanese album and CD, alongside the digital "Fruitness" single.
- A slightly edited (spoken introduction removed) version of "Relax (International)" (4:26)

== Track listings ==
- All discographical information pertains to the original UK single release only.
- All songs written by Peter Gill/Holly Johnson/Brian Nash/Mark O'Toole, unless otherwise noted.

PZTAS 7 picture disc.

7-inch: ZTT / ZTAS 7 (UK)

1. "Welcome to the Pleasuredome" (Altered Real) – 4:20
2. "Get It On" (Marc Bolan) – 3:28
3. "Happy Hi!" [fade] (Gill/Johnson/O'Toole) – 3:47

7-inch: Island / 7-99653 (US)

1. "Welcome to the Pleasuredome" (Trevor Horn Remix) – 4:20
2. "Relax" (International Live) – 4:26

12-inch: ZTT / 12 ZTAS 7 (UK)

1. "Welcome to the Pleasuredome" (Real Altered) – 9:42
2. "Get It On" – 3:28
3. "Happy Hi!" – 4:04
4. "Relax" (International) (Gill/Johnson/O'Toole) – 4:51

12-inch: ZTT / 12 XZTAS 7 (UK)

12 XZTAS 7 cover art.

A
'Fruitness'

1. "Welcome to the Pleasuredome" (Fruitness) – 12:15

B
'Fruitness and light'

1. "Get It On" – 2:32
2. "Happy Hi!" – 4:04
3. "Born to Run" ("live") – 4:49

12-inch: Island / 0-96889 (US)

1. "Welcome to the Pleasuredome" (Trevor Horn Remix) – 9:47
2. "Get It On" – 2:32
3. "Happy Hi!" – 4:02
4. "Relax" (International/Live) – 4:51

== Charts ==
=== Weekly charts ===
Chart (1985)	Peak position
Australia (Kent Music Report)	46
Austria (Ö3 Austria Top 40)	20
Belgium (Ultratop 50 Flanders)	13
Canada Top Singles (RPM)	41
France (IFOP)	65
Iceland (RÚV)	5
Ireland (IRMA)	2
Netherlands (Dutch Top 40)	12
Netherlands (Single Top 100)	14
New Zealand (Recorded Music NZ)	9
Switzerland (Schweizer Hitparade)	20
UK Singles (Official Charts)	2
US Billboard Hot 100	48
US Dance Club Songs (Billboard)	31
West Germany (GfK)	9

Chart (1993)	Peak position
Europe (Eurochart Hot 100)	40
UK Singles (OCC)	18
UK Dance (Music Week)	3
UK Club Chart (Music Week)	20

Chart (2000)	Peak position
UK Singles (OCC)	45

=== Year-end charts ===
Chart (1985)	Position
UK Singles (OCC)	48
