= Warriors of the Wasteland =

Single by Frankie Goes to Hollywood

from the album Liverpool
- B-side: "Warriors (Of the Wasteland)"
- Released: 10 November 1986
- Genre: Art rock
- Length: 3:57 (single version); 4:55 (album version); 9:46 (Twelve Wild Disciples mix)
- Label: ZTT
- Songwriters: Peter Gill; Holly Johnson; Brian Nash; Mark O'Toole
- Producer: Stephen Lipson

Frankie Goes to Hollywood singles chronology
"Rage Hard" (1986)	"Warriors of the Wasteland" (1986)	"Watching the Wildlife" (1987)

Music video
- "Warriors of the Wasteland" on YouTube

"Warriors of the Wasteland" is the sixth single by English pop band Frankie Goes to Hollywood. Released on 10 November 1986 as the second single from their album Liverpool, it stalled at number 19 in the UK Singles Chart (making it the group's first UK hit not to go Top Five), number 7 in Germany and number 13 in Switzerland.

== Background ==
"Warriors" (attack)
An excerpt from "Warriors" (attack).

Having already referenced Dylan Thomas in "Rage Hard", for "Warriors of the Wasteland" Holly Johnson turned to T. S. Eliot for inspiration, citing Eliot's The Waste Land poem, Mad Max 2, and the 1979 film, The Warriors as inspirations.

Johnson stated to No. 1 magazine the song was of social inequality saying, "Warriors implies fighting tribal heroes. It is political in that it shows up the divide between those who have and those who have not. Society is designed to keep that division as wide as possible. Rich people and corporate businesses have got it worked out so they launder money and avoid tax while the education system keep a type of ignorance going. I believe in the conspiracy theory, the well to do pay for a better education and always keep control."

The single remix of the song is different in contrast to the album version. The album version is longer, has an extended atmospheric intro which hits a more aggressive metal sound with drums and prominent guitar riffs, while the single version has a more dance oriented groove. The remix was made by Trevor Horn, who produced their earliest releases.

== Critical reception ==
Smash Hits described "Warriors of the Wasteland" as, "the Liverpool louts having lost their winning formula and 'Warriors (Of The Wasteland)' having none of the tongue-in-cheek humour or honest-to-goodness sleaze of earlier efforts. In fact, it sounds like they’ve been listening to too many Iron Maiden records." James Brown of Sounds also gave a negative review calling the song "a predictable piece of rock junk" which he believed showed how Frankie Goes to Hollywood had become "appallingly tame and useless" and "so bloody obviously boring that they have resorted to making competent rock records".

Billboard said of it that "art-rock megaproduction waxes critical of society's inequalities." Record Mirror praised the song saying, "Now they’re trying to be a rock band. This is very amusing and even danceable — if you’ve got a steady pulse — but what does it all mean?"

== Chart performance ==
Despite the promotion, poor record sales caused "Warriors of the Wasteland" to stall at number 19 in the UK Singles Chart which made it Frankie Goes to Hollywood's first single in the UK to not enter the Top 5. It reached no higher than number 7 in Germany for two weeks, number 12 in Ireland and number 13 in Switzerland.

== Track listing ==
All discographical information pertains to UK releases only unless noted.

7"
ZTT / ZTAS 25

1. "Warriors of the Wasteland" (Twelve Wild Disciples mix edit) – 3:55
2. "Warriors (Of the Wasteland)" – 5:00
- The single version (A-side) is a remix by Trevor Horn, recreated digitally using samples and synths. The AA-side is the album version, with the spoken intro to "Rage Hard" tagged onto the end. The titles were swapped on most overseas releases, thus causing confusion on most fansites.

12"
ZTT / 12 ZTAS 25

1. "Warriors" (Twelve Wild Disciples mix) – 9:45
2. "Warriors" (instrumental) [unlisted] – 4:50
3. "Warriors" (return) – 1:22
4. "Warriors" (end) – 3:29
- As with many ZTT releases, unlisted tracks have created confusion as to which track has which title. "Warriors" (return) can be taken to be the full 6:12 instrumental track, or just the 1:22 reprise. The 2014 digital reissue labelled both pieces as "Warriors" (return).
- "Warriors" (end) began life as an unreleased track called "Pocket Vibrator".
- On the sleeve notes to this release, producer Trevor Horn noted: "On Liverpool the members of Frankie Goes to Hollywood played "Warriors" with their own notoriously fair hands ... This so-called 12" is in fact a total cheat ... No-one played anything, in any orthodox sense. It was all done by computers, very powerful computers ... juggling and organising pre-recorded sounds."

12"
ZTT / 12 ZTAX 25

1. "Warriors" (Turn of the Knife mix) – 8:09
2. "Warriors" (instrumental) [unlisted] – 4:50
3. "Warriors" (return) – 1:22
4. "Warriors" (end) – 3:29

"Warriors" (Turn of the Knife mix)

12"
ZTT / 12 ZTAK 25

"Heavy Mental"

1. "Warriors" (attack mix) – 6:30
2. "Warriors" (instrumental) [unlisted] – 4:50
3. "Warriors" (return) – 1:22
4. "Warriors" (end) – 3:29
- The "Attack" mix featured additional guitar parts by Gary Moore. A 7" edited version of this track also exists on white label.

12"
Island / 0-96799 United States

1. "Warriors of the Wasteland" (Twelve Wild Disciples mix) – 9:42
2. "Warriors of the Wasteland" (Turn of the Knife mix) – 8:11

A white label release of "Warriors" (attack)

CD
ZTT / ZCID 25

"Warriors" (compacted)

1. "Warriors" (introduction) – 2:25
2. "Warriors" (Twelve Wild Disciples mix) – 9:45
3. "Warriors of the Wasteland" [fewer lyrics] – 5:02
4. "Warriors (Of the Wasteland)" – 3:57
5. "Warriors" (Monopoly Re-solution) ['rats in a cage'] – 2:21
- The CD is one track without a title list, and the titles above are for convenience of reference, apart from "Warriors" (Twelve Wild Disciples) and "Warriors (Of the Wasteland)".
- "Introduction" starts with various vocal sounds, then sped-up samples re-edited, then slowed down samples, moving into what sounds like the "return" mix and some re-edited instrumental bits.
- "Twelve Wild Disciples" is the first 12" mix – a reconstructed version with additional keyboards.
- The "fewer lyrics" version is the album version with verse lyrics missing.
- "Warriors (Of the Wasteland)" sounds similar to Twelve Wild Disciples, but a 7" edit.
- "Monopoly Re-solution" is a stand-alone track.

"Warriors" (compacted) was re-released on the Sexmix compilation in 2012.

MC
ZTT / CTIS 25

"Warriors" (cassetted)

1. "A Matter of Life and Death" – 0:04
2. "Warriors of the Wasteland" [instrumental] – 2:59
3. "Warriors (Of the Wasteland)" [7" version] – 3:09
4. "Warriors" (Twelve Wild Disciples) [instrumental] – 8:32
5. "we're rats" [various noises from 'Introduced'] – 0:43
6. "Warriors" [excerpts from 'Return'] – 1:27
7. "Warriors" (Monopoly Re-solution) ['rats in a cage'] – 3:03
- As with the CD single, no individual tracks are listed on the sleeve, which simply states "... featuring Warriors (Twelve Wild Disciples mix) and a phenomenon of megabytes". The latter phrase, which does not specifically refer to any tracks in the cassette, is a ZTT coinage meaning "remix" or "collection of remixes" (i.e. remix album), and as such it was also used as a subtitle for The Art of the 12", a 2011 2-CD release featuring a selection of classic ZTT remixes, two more volumes of which followed in 2012 and 2014.
- The opening voiceover and the instrumental version of the "Twelve Wild Disciples" mix were unique to this cassette, until CTIS25 was finally released on CD in 2011 as part of the Liverpool deluxe edition.

Digital download
ZTT

1. "Warriors of the Wasteland" (7" A-side) – 5:02
2. "Warriors of the Wasteland" (Twelve Wild Disciples mix) – 9:45
3. "Warriors of the Wasteland" (Turn of the Knife mix) – 8:10
4. "Warriors of the Wasteland" (Attack mix) – 6:32
5. "Warriors of the Wasteland" (return) – 6:18
6. "Warriors of the Wasteland" (end) – 3:36
7. "Warriors (Of the Wasteland)" (7" B-side) – 3:56
- Track 1 is actually the "fewer lyrics" version.

== Charts ==
=== Weekly charts ===
Chart (1986–1987)	Peak position
Finland (Suomen virallinen lista)	23
France (IFOP)	50
Ireland (IRMA)	12
Italy (Musica e dischi)	24
Netherlands (Dutch Top 40)	36
Netherlands (Single Top 100)	26
New Zealand (Recorded Music NZ)	30
Switzerland (Schweizer Hitparade)	13
UK Singles (OCC)	19
West Germany (GfK)	7

=== Year-end charts ===
Chart (1987)	Position
West Germany (Media Control)	65
