= Two Tribes =

1984 single by Frankie Goes to Hollywood

Single by Frankie Goes to Hollywood

from the album Welcome to the Pleasuredome
- B-side: "One February Friday"; "War"
- Released: 4 June 1984
- Studio: Producer's Workshop (Fulham); Sarm West (London)
- Genre: New pop; Hi-NRG; disco; synth-pop
- Length: 3:56; 3:23 (edit)
- Label: ZTT (ZTAS 3)
- Songwriters: Peter Gill; Holly Johnson; Mark O'Toole
- Producer: Trevor Horn

Frankie Goes to Hollywood singles chronology
"Relax" (1983)	"Two Tribes" (1984)	"The Power of Love" (1984)

Music video
- "Two Tribes" on YouTube

"Two Tribes" is an anti-war song by British band Frankie Goes to Hollywood, released in the UK by ZTT Records on 4 June 1984. The song was later included on the album Welcome to the Pleasuredome. Presenting a nihilistic, gleeful lyric expressing enthusiasm for nuclear war, it juxtaposes a relentless pounding bass line and guitar riff inspired by American funk and R&B pop with influences of Russian classical music, in an opulent arrangement produced by Trevor Horn.

The single was a phenomenal success in the UK, helped by a wide range of remixes and supported by an advertising campaign depicting the band as members of the Red Army. It entered the UK Singles Chart at number one on 10 June 1984, where it stayed for nine consecutive weeks, during which time the group's previous single "Relax" climbed back up the charts to number two. It was the longest-running number-one single in the UK of the 1980s. It has sold 1.58 million copies in the UK as of November 2012, being in the Top 30 best-selling singles in the UK as of 2022.

Songwriters Johnson, Gill and O'Toole received the 1984 Ivor Novello award for Best Song Musically and Lyrically. In 2015 the song was voted by the British public as the nation's 14th-favourite 1980s number one in a poll for ITV.

== Music ==
A version of "Two Tribes" was originally recorded for a BBC John Peel session in October 1982. The basic structure of the song, including its signature bass-line, percussion arrangement and idiosyncratic introductory and middle eight sections, were already intact prior to any involvement from ZTT or eventual producer Trevor Horn. Further work was conducted at Producer's Workshop in Fulham, which Stephen Lipson selected as a cheaper alternative to Sarm Studios, where Frankie Goes Hollywood recorded their song "Relax". Horn identified "Two Tribes" as the band's next single due to its bassline despite reservations from Lipson, who was not impressed with the demo and thought that "there wasn't much to the song." The band recorded their parts, which was not deemed satisfactory, so Horn, Lipson, J.J. Jeczalik, and Andy Richards redid the parts themselves. From those sessions, Lipson's guitar was the only instrument retained in the final mix.

"Two Tribes" (John Peel session)
An excerpt from the original John Peel session recording (1982).

After their time at Producer's Workshop, the four moved back to Sarm Studios to further develop the song. A considerable amount of attention was placed on the bass part, particularly with the articulation of each note. In an adjacent studio, Clive Langer and Alan Winstanley were in the process of mixing an album, which they temporarily left to work on a different record. By the time Langer and Winstanley returned back to Sarm Studios, the bass part was still receiving adjustments. The final programmed bass pattern included a note that dropped down an octave whereas the original lacked this element.

Holly Johnson noted that there were "two elements in the music – an American funk line and a Russian line. It's the most obvious demonstration of two tribes that we have today." Lipson programmed some parts on a Synclavier, including the drum break at the end of the first chorus. He recalled that Horn "thought it was the weirdest fill he'd ever heard — a jazz fill in the middle of a pop song. However, I told him I thought it was great, so he went along with it, although begrudgingly, and that was indicative of how we worked together." The LinnDrum programming was added by Horn late into the song's production.

== Title and lyrics ==
The single was released at a time when the Cold War had intensified and fears about global nuclear warfare were at a peak. Although Johnson would attest in a 1984 radio interview that the "two tribes" of the song potentially represented any pair of warring adversaries (giving the examples of "cowboys and Indians or Captain Kirk and Klingons"), the line "On the air America/I modelled shirts by Van Heusen" is a reference to then US President Ronald Reagan. Reagan had advertised for Phillips Van Heusen in 1953 (briefly reviving the association in the early 1980s). The title of his first film had been Love Is on the Air.

The lyric "working for the black gas" is, according to Johnson, "About oil surpassing gold. How you might as well be paid in petrol." And the line "Are we living in a land where sex and horror are the new gods?" was inspired by the 1959 British film Cover Girl Killer. Johnson explained, "The TV was on in the background while I was doing me ironing and suddenly this character came out with that statement." (The actual dialogue, which occurs at about 48 minutes 24 seconds into the film, is "Surely sex and horror are the new gods in this polluted world of so-called entertainment?")

The track featured snippets of narration from actor Patrick Allen, recreating his narration from the British Protect and Survive public information films about how to survive a nuclear war. (The original Protect and Survive soundtracks were sampled for the 7-inch mixes.)

The 12-inch A- and B-sides featured voice parts by British actor Chris Barrie imitating Ronald Reagan. Barrie also voiced the Reagan puppet on Spitting Image. Barrie's parts as 'Reagan' included praise for the band, as well as parts of Adolf Hitler's speech to a court after the Beer Hall Putsch: "You may pronounce us guilty a thousand times over, but the Goddess of the Eternal Court of History will smile and tear to tatters the brief of the State Prosecutor and the sentence of this court, for She acquits us." Barrie also voiced the last sentence of "History Will Absolve Me" (Spanish: "La historia me absolverá") which is the concluding sentence and subsequent title of a four-hour speech made by Fidel Castro on 16 October 1953. Castro made the speech in his own defense in court against the charges brought against him after leading an attack on the Moncada Barracks on 26 July 1953. Barrie would return for the band's next single, "The Power of Love", imitating Mike Read in a parody of the DJ's ban on their previous single, "Relax".

The song's title derives from the line "two mighty warrior tribes went to war" from the film Mad Max 2 (the line is also spoken by Holly Johnson at the beginning of the session version).

== Critical reception ==
American magazine Cash Box called it "a more scintillating anti-war track than ["The War Song"]", saying it is "both an effective dance cut and a piece of modern art." Richard Harris from NME wrote, "'Two Tribes' is a fine example of why over-production is a musical virtue, not least when it ceases to be a pop song and tries to disco-ise Tchaikovsky."

== Release ==
ZTT released "Two Tribes" on 4 June 1984, with the 7-inch single including "One February Friday" as its B-side. "One February Friday" was an interview between Morley and the group's three musicians, Mark O'Toole, Brian Nash and Peter Gill, over an otherwise untitled instrumental track. A similar track had been included on the B-side of "Relax", with the title "One September Monday". The principal B-side to the original 12-inch single was a cover version of "War", which became the subject of an extended remix (subtitled "Hidden") on the single's third UK 12-inch release, where it was promoted as a double A-side with "Carnage".

ZTT aggressively marketed the single in terms of its political angle, promoting it with images of the group wearing American military garb in combat, as well as Soviet-style army uniforms set against an American urban backdrop. The UK cassette single featured a cut-together combination of "Surrender", "Carnage" and "Annihilation", plus Reagan snippets and interview sections not included on any other release.

The original cover art featured a Soviet mural of Vladimir Lenin in St Petersburg, and images of Reagan and then-UK Prime Minister Margaret Thatcher. The sleeve notes, attributed to ZTT's Paul Morley, dispassionately reported details of the relative nuclear arsenals of each superpower.

== Videos ==
The Godley & Creme-directed video depicted a wrestling match between then-US President Ronald Reagan and Konstantin Chernenko, then Secretary of the Communist Party of the Soviet Union, in front of group members and an assembly of representatives from the world's nations. The match eventually degenerates into global destruction. Certain violent moments ("Reagan" is seen, for example, biting "Chernenko's" ear) were edited from the version shown on MTV.

A longer version of the video (based on the "Hibakusha" mix) included an introductory, heavily edited monologue by Richard Nixon taken from an ad from his 1960 US Presidential campaign ("No ... firm diplomacy ... No ... peace for America and the world"), plus similar contributions from other world leaders, including Lord Beaverbrook, Yasser Arafat and John F. Kennedy. The complete soundtrack to the extended video was eventually released as "Two Tribes (Video Destructo)" on the German version of the Twelve Inches compilation. A third version of the video, included on the band's From An Wasteland to an Artificial Paradise VHS, retains the introduction, but omits most of the inserted clips in the main wrestling sequence.

== Personnel ==
Credits sourced from Sound on Sound.

Frankie Goes to Hollywood

- Holly Johnson – lead vocals
- Paul Rutherford – backing vocals

Other musicians

- Trevor Horn – LinnDrum and Fairlight CMI programming; producer
- J.J. Jeczalik – Fairlight CMI programming
- Stephen Lipson – electric guitars, Synclavier programming
- Andy Richards – Roland Jupiter-8 synthesizer, Roland MC-4 Microcomposer sequencer, Hammond organ

== Original 1984 mixes ==
The song appeared in the form of six mixes, including "Annihilation", "Carnage", "Hibakusha", "Cowboys and Indians", "We Don't Want to Die" and "For the Victims of Ravishment".

The first 12-inch mix ("Annihilation") started with an air-raid siren, and included advice from Allen about how to tag and dispose of family members should they die in the fallout shelter (taken from the public information film Casualties). This version appeared on CD editions of the album. "Annihilation" was the basis for the "Hibakusha" mix, which was originally released in a limited edition, Japanese-only version of the 1985 album Bang!. Hibakusha is the Japanese word for survivors of the atomic bombing of Hiroshima and Nagasaki.

"For the Victims of Ravishment" appeared on the LP and cassette editions of the album Welcome to the Pleasuredome. It is the shortest version, at 3:27 minutes. This mix derived from the "Carnage" mix, which prominently featured strings as well as vocal samples from Allen and the group's B-side interview.

Since 1984, "Two Tribes" has been re-issued several times, generally involving third-party remixes bearing little relation to the original releases in terms of either structure or character.

== Charts ==
=== Weekly charts ===
Weekly chart performance for "Two Tribes"
Chart (1984–85)	Peak position
Australia (Kent Music Report)	4
Austria (Ö3 Austria Top 40)	16
Belgium (Ultratop 50 Flanders)	1
Canada (The Record)	17
Canada Top Singles (RPM)	9
Denmark (IFPI)	6
Europe (European Hot 100 Singles)	2
Finland (Suomen virallinen lista)	2
France (SNEP)	22
Greece (IFPI)	1
Iceland (RÚV)	8
Ireland (IRMA)	1
Italy (Musica e dischi)	15
Netherlands (Dutch Top 40)	1
Netherlands (Single Top 100)	1
New Zealand (Recorded Music NZ)	1
Norway (VG-lista)	4
South Africa (Springbok Radio)	8
Spain (AFYVE)	8
Sweden (Sverigetopplistan)	9
Switzerland (Schweizer Hitparade)	4
UK Singles (Official Charts)	1
US Billboard Hot 100	43
US Dance Club Songs (Billboard)	3
US Mainstream Rock Airplay (Billboard)	27
US Cash Box Top 100	37
West Germany (GfK)	1
Zimbabwe (ZIMA)	15

Chart (1994)	Peak position
UK Airplay (Music Week)	35
UK Club Chart (Music Week)	30

=== Year-end charts ===
1984 year-end chart performance for "Two Tribes"
Chart (1984)	Position
Australia (Kent Music Report)	20
Belgium (Ultratop)	2
Canada Top Singles (RPM)	70
Netherlands (Dutch Top 40)	6
Netherlands (Single Top 100)	14
New Zealand (RIANZ)	12
Switzerland (Schweizer Hitparade)	22
UK Singles (Gallup)	4
US Hot Dance/Disco (Billboard)	34
West Germany (Media Control)	10

== Certifications ==
Certifications and sales for "Two Tribes"
Region	Certification	Certified units/sales
Canada (Music Canada)	Gold	50,000^{^}
Netherlands (NVPI)	Gold	75,000^{^}
United Kingdom (BPI)	Platinum	1,580,000
^{^} Shipments figures based on certification alone.
