= Watching the Wildlife =

Single by Frankie Goes to Hollywood

from the album Liverpool
- B-side: "The Waves"
- Released: 23 February 1987
- Recorded: 1986
- Genre: Baroque pop
- Length: 4:19
- Label: ZTT
- Songwriters: Peter Gill; Holly Johnson; Brian Nash; Mark O'Toole
- Producer: Stephen Lipson

Frankie Goes to Hollywood singles chronology
"Warriors of the Wasteland" (1986)	"Watching the Wildlife" (1987)

Music video
- "Watching the Wildlife" on YouTube

"Watching the Wildlife" is the seventh and last single by English pop band Frankie Goes to Hollywood. Released on 23 February 1987, it is the most radio friendly of the three singles from Liverpool going for a Beatlesque approach with string orchestration and psychedelic guitar riffs.

It is also the only one of the three Liverpool singles not to have a CD single release at that time and the mix used on the 7" vinyl single has never appeared on a UK-issued compact disc. The single only reached number 28 on the UK Singles Chart and #23 in Germany.

== Background ==
Bassist Mark O'Toole explained that the song is "basically a story of someone going through their life doing the things they normally do — like the girls putting out the washing and stuff like that."

The 7" packaging made reference to animals, with a panda and dolphin on the sleeve. The cassette single more references to sexual intercourse with the instrumental mix being dubbed "The Condom Mix" on the cassette single. The promotional condom that was to be distributed with each single would have stopped the single sales counting towards the UK charts as the official chart provider had introduced new rules to this effect, so the idea was abandoned. Promotional copies complete with the condom do exist, however.

== Music video ==
The song's accompanying music video was directed by Mike Portelly.

== Critical reception ==
Upon its release as a single, Jerry Smith of Music Week praised "Watching the Wildlife" as a "dynamic number whose dramatic piano and thundering beat sweep Holly Johnson's vocals along". He added that it "should do much to revive their flagging fortunes." Roger Morton of Record Mirror said of the single, "The fact that you're supposed to get a CONDOM with the cassette version of this could lead to irksome speculation about the title. So let's just say that giving away prophylactics is a GOOD IDEA, and if this piece of swinging, brassy, orchestral bombast wasn't all swollen up like an inflated Durex, it might have been too."

== Chart performance ==
By the time "Watching the Wildlife" was released as a single, poor record sales and interest in the Liverpool album had all but waned. The single failed to break the Top 20 in Europe, only reaching number 28 on the UK Singles Chart, number 23 in Germany and number 24 in Ireland. "Watching the Wildlife" would prove to be the last single released by Frankie Goes to Hollywood as they disbanded shortly after its release, initiating a series of lawsuits by the record label ZTT over contract and royalty differences.

== Track listing ==
All discographical information pertains to UK releases only.

7"
ZTT / ZTAS 26

"animal fur/animal smell"

1. "Watching the Wildlife" – 3:50
2. "The Waves" – 3:02

12"
ZTT / 12 ZTAS 26

1. "Watching the Wildlife" (hotter) [labelled as "animal fur"] – 9:02
2. "Wildlife Bit 1" [unlisted] – 0:38
3. "Wildlife Bit 2" [unlisted] – 0:37
4. "Watching the Wildlife" (voiceless) – 3:49
5. "The Waves" – 3:02
- "Watching the Wildlife" (voiceless) was re-released on the Sexmix compilation in 2012.

12"
ZTT / 12 ZTAX 26

1. "Watching the Wildlife" (movement 2) – 7:12
2. "Wildlife Bit 3" – 6:24
3. "Wildlife Bit 4" – 4:20
4. "The Waves" – 3:02
- "Movement 2" is a mainly instrumental mix, featuring a unique orchestration of the song by arranger David Bedford, and until recently was one of the rarest tracks by Frankie, being only available on this 12" record which itself was a low selling item. The "Movement 2" mix finally made it onto compact disc as part of ZTTs Element series reissues.
- "Wildlife Bit 3" is an extended mix by engineer Robert Kraushaar.
- "Wildlife Bit 4" is an instrumental mix without drums, guitar or bass, showcasing the orchestral arrangement.

12"
ZTT / 12 ZTE 26

"Beobachtungen im Wilden Leben" (Die Letzten Tage der Menschheit mix)

"Beobachtungen im Wilden Leben" (roughly translated as "Observations in the wild life")

1. "Beobachtungen im Wilden Leben" (Die Letzten Tage der Menschheit mix) (use a condom) – 10:16
2. "Wildlife Bit 1" [unlisted] – 0:38
3. "Wildlife Bit 2" [unlisted] – 0:37
4. "Watching the Wildlife" (voiceless) – 3:49
5. "The Waves" – 3:02
- The "Die Letzten Tage der Menschheit" mix ('The last days of mankind' mix) was deceptively listed as mixed by Klaus Schulze, which got ZTT into trouble with Schulze. It was actually mixed by Paul Morley, and features samples from an AIDS phoneline. This release was deliberately packaged to look like a German import, complete with German titles, an Island Records catalogue number (in addition to its correct UK ZTT one) and even an Island Records label design. It is the only UK issue not to have a normal ZTT label.

MC
ZTT / CTIS 26

1. "Watching the Wildlife" (bit 4) [a.k.a. "Orchestral Wildlife"] – 4:26
2. "Watching the Wildlife" (hotter) ["Hotter Wildlife"] – 9:09
3. "The Waves" – 3:02
4. "Wildlife Bit 1" ["One Bit"] – 0:38
5. "Wildlife Bit 2" ["Two Bit"] – 0:37
6. "Watching the Wildlife" (bit 3) [a.k.a. "The Condom Mix"] – 6:26
- Although the tracks were listed on the sleeve with unique titles ("Orchestral Wildlife", "The Condom Mix" etc.), they are in fact the same tracks that appeared on the first two 12" singles.
- This cassette single was included on the 2011 deluxe reissue of Liverpool, with a reordered track listing (being "Bit 3", "Bit 4", "The Waves", "Hotter", "Bit 1" and "Bit 2").

Digital download
ZTT

1. "Watching the Wildlife" (7" mix) – 3:52
2. "Watching the Wildlife" (hotter) – 9:08
3. "Watching the Wildlife" (movement 2) – 7:13
4. "Watching the Wildlife" (Die Letzten Tage der Menschheit) – 10:14
5. "Watching the Wildlife" (bit 1) – 0:38
6. "Watching the Wildlife" (bit 2) – 0:37
7. "Watching the Wildlife" (bit 3) – 6:25
8. "Watching the Wildlife" (bit 4) – 4:24
9. "Watching the Wildlife" (voiceless) – 3:50
10. "The Waves" – 3:02
- The version of the 7" mix included here is the version from Frankie Said, which is not the exact same mix.

== Charts ==
Chart (1987)	Peak position
Netherlands (Single Top 100)	47
Ireland (IRMA)	24
UK Singles (OCC)	28
West Germany (GfK)	23
