= Welcome to the Pleasuredome =

1984 studio album by Frankie Goes to Hollywood

- Illustration by Lo Cole

Studio album by Frankie Goes to Hollywood
- Released: 29 October 1984
- Recorded: 1983–1984
- Studios: Manor (Oxford); Sarm (London)
- Genre: Pop
- Length: 64:06
- Label: ZTT
- Producer: Trevor Horn

Frankie Goes to Hollywood chronology
Welcome to the Pleasuredome (1984)	Bang! (1985)

Alternative cover
- The original CD cover, which was taken from one of the vinyl record's dust jackets. Cover photography by Peter Ashworth

Singles from Welcome to the Pleasuredome
- 1. "Relax" Released: 24 October 1983; 2. "Two Tribes" Released: 4 June 1984; 3. "The Power of Love" Released: 19 November 1984; 4. "Welcome to the Pleasuredome" Released: 18 March 1985

Welcome to the Pleasuredome is the debut studio album by the English band Frankie Goes to Hollywood, first released on 29 October 1984 by ZTT Records. Originally issued as a vinyl double album, it was assured of a UK chart entry at number one due to reported advance sales of over one million. It actually sold around a quarter of a million copies in its first week. The album was also a top-10 seller internationally in countries such as Switzerland, Sweden, Australia and New Zealand.

The album was commercially successful and contained new versions of the songs from the group's singles from the same year ("Relax" and "Two Tribes", plus B-side "War"), as well as several cover versions. Trevor Horn's production dominated the record so thoroughly that the band's own instrumental performances were often replaced by session musicians or Horn himself. Frankie's second album, Liverpool, actively featured the full band.

The ballad "The Power of Love" subsequently provided the group with their third consecutive UK number-one single.

To celebrate the album's 30th anniversary, in October 2014, ZTT through Union Square Music released a limited edition (2,000 copies only) box set titled Inside the Pleasuredome, available exclusively from the website pledgemusic.com. The box set contains rarities on 10" vinyl, as well as a book, a DVD, a cassette (featuring 13 mixes of "Relax" and its B-side "One September Monday") as well as a new 2014 remastered version of Welcome to the Pleasuredome on 180g vinyl.

== Sleeve art ==
The cover art was conceived by ZTT owner Paul Morley and illustrated by graphic artist Lo Cole. The front cover featured an illustration of the Frankie Goes to Hollywood band members; on the back of the album was an illustration of a large animal orgy; and the inner gatefold artwork was an image of a procession of animals entering the head of a very large phallus. The sleeve art proved controversial, and the printing company refused to print the album covers. Cole was forced to alter the orgy image by adding green fig leaves to cover the offending animal genitalia.

The album's alternative CD cover, and some of the promotional material, used a different image to the vinyl release, instead utilising Peter Ashworth's photograph of the band in a jungle setting built by Ashworth in his studio.

== Critical reception ==
Professional ratings
Review scores
Source	Rating
AllMusic	4/5 stars
Los Angeles Times	3/4 stars
Mojo	4/5 stars
Pitchfork	8.7/10
Record Collector	4/5 stars
Record Mirror	4/5 stars
Rolling Stone	3/5 stars
Smash Hits	7/10
Sounds	4/5 stars
The Village Voice	C

Reviewing Welcome to the Pleasuredome for Sounds, Carole Linfield praised Frankie Goes to Hollywood for merging "the hip with the witless" on an album of "overkill, overjoy and overcompensation", summarising it as "pretentious rubbish for which we're rewarded with almost illicit ecstasy ... Frankie makes gullibility fashionable." "By next week I'll be tired of it," commented Richard Cook in NME, "but today this 'play' is funny, sharp, gorgeous." Jim Reid of Record Mirror felt that while the album "would have made a brilliant single LP", it is still "superbly produced and head and shoulders above the rest", observing "intelligence, real sexual glamour and a sense of fun" distinguishing the band from other contemporary pop acts.

In the United States, Rolling Stone critic David Fricke found that the album's songs are "too often ... merely alluring fragments", while concluding that it "revels in its own subversiveness with such audacious glee that it is impossible not to be captivated, if not entirely convinced". The Village Voice's Robert Christgau was less impressed, calling the group "a truly great hype" but ultimately only "a marginally competent arena-rock band who don't know how to distinguish between effeminacy and pretension".

Retrospectively, AllMusic reviewer Ned Raggett said that Welcome to the Pleasuredome, divorced from "the hype, controversy, and attendant craziness surrounding Frankie", "holds up as an outrageously over-the-top, bizarre, but fun release", as well as "more a testament to Trevor Horn's production skills than anything else." For Pitchfork, Sasha Geffen wrote that the album's impact "rang out into the years that followed, emblematizing the '80s and loosening the way for bands like Erasure, who would carry a similar torch into the rave years."

== Track listing ==
All songs written and composed by Peter Gill, Holly Johnson, Brian Nash and Mark O'Toole except where noted.

Side 1: "F – Pray Frankie Pray"
No.	Title	Writer(s)	Length
1.	"The World Is My Oyster (Including Well, Snatch of Fury)"	Frankie Goes to Hollywood, Andy Richards	1:57
2.	"Welcome to the Pleasuredome"		13:40

Side 2: "G – Say Frankie Say"
No.	Title	Writer(s)	Length
3.	"Relax (Come Fighting)"		3:56
4.	"War (...and Hide)"	Barrett Strong, Norman Whitfield	6:12
5.	"Two Tribes (For the Victims of Ravishment)"		3:23
6.	"(Tag)" (unlisted track)		0:35

Side 3: "T – Stay Frankie Stay"
No.	Title	Writer(s)	Length
7.	"Ferry (Go)"	Gerry Marsden	1:49
8.	"Born to Run"	Bruce Springsteen	3:56
9.	"San Jose (The Way)"	Burt Bacharach, Hal David	3:09
10.	"Wish (The Lads Were Here)"		2:48
11.	"The Ballad of 32"		4:47

Side 4: "H – Play Frankie Play"
No.	Title	Length
12.	"Krisco Kisses"	2:57
13.	"Black Night White Light"	4:05
14.	"The Only Star in Heaven"	4:16
15.	"The Power of Love"	5:28
16.	"...Bang"	1:08
Total length:		64:00

== Personnel ==
Frankie Goes to Hollywood

- Holly Johnson – lead vocals
- Paul Rutherford – backing vocals
- Brian Nash – guitar
- Mark O'Toole – bass guitar
- Peter Gill – drums

Additional personnel

- J. J. Jeczalik – keyboards, programming, software
- Andy Richards – keyboards
- Luís Jardim – percussion
- Anne Dudley – keyboards, string arrangement on "The Power of Love"
- Stephen Lipson – guitar
- Steve Howe – acoustic guitar on "Welcome to the Pleasuredome"
- Trevor Horn – programming, backing vocals, bass guitar

Production

- Produced by Trevor Horn
- Engineers – Stuart Bruce, Steve Lipson
- Mastering – Ian Cooper

Technical

- Cover concept - Paul Morley
- Illustration by Lo Cole
- Cover photography - Peter Ashworth

== Charts ==
=== Weekly charts ===
1984–1985 weekly chart performance for Welcome to the Pleasuredome
Chart (1984–1985)	Peak position
Australian Albums (Kent Music Report)	7
Austrian Albums (Ö3 Austria)	3
Canada Top Albums/CDs (RPM)	9
Dutch Albums (Album Top 100)	2
European Albums (Music & Media)	1
Finnish Albums (Suomen virallinen lista)	10
German Albums (Offizielle Top 100)	4
New Zealand Albums (RMNZ)	1
Norwegian Albums (VG-lista)	8
Swedish Albums (Sverigetopplistan)	7
Swiss Albums (Schweizer Hitparade)	5
UK Albums (Official Charts)	1
US Billboard 200	33

2025 weekly chart performance for Welcome to the Pleasuredome
Chart (2025)	Peak position
Croatian International Albums (HDU)	30
German Pop Albums (Offizielle Top 100)	3

=== Year-end charts ===
1984 year-end chart performance for Welcome to the Pleasuredome
Chart (1984)	Position
Canada Top Albums/CDs (RPM)	51
Dutch Albums (Album Top 100)	39
UK Albums (Gallup)	10

1985 year-end chart performance for Welcome to the Pleasuredome
Chart (1985)	Position
Australian Albums (Kent Music Report)	47
Austrian Albums (Ö3 Austria)	17
Canada Top Albums/CDs (RPM)	84
Dutch Albums (Album Top 100)	28
German Albums (Offizielle Top 100)	18
New Zealand Albums (RMNZ)	11
UK Albums (Gallup)	33
US Billboard 200	41

== Certifications ==
Certifications for Welcome to the Pleasuredome
Region	Certification	Certified units/sales
Austria (IFPI Austria)	Gold	25,000^{*}
Canada (Music Canada)	Platinum	100,000^{^}
Germany (BVMI)	Platinum	500,000^{^}
Netherlands (NVPI)	Gold	50,000^{^}
New Zealand (RMNZ)	Platinum	15,000^{^}
Norway (IFPI Norway)	Gold	25,000^{*}
United Kingdom (BPI)	3× Platinum	1,100,000
United States (RIAA)	Gold	500,000^{^}
^{*} Sales figures based on certification alone.^{^} Shipments figures based on certification alone.
