= The Power of Love (Frankie Goes to Hollywood song) =

1984 single by Frankie Goes to Hollywood

Single by Frankie Goes to Hollywood

from the album Welcome to the Pleasuredome
- B-side: "The World Is My Oyster" "Holier Than Thou"
- Released: 19 November 1984
- Genre: Synth-pop
- Length: 5:30
- Label: ZTT
- Songwriters: Holly Johnson; Peter Gill; Mark O'Toole; Brian Nash
- Producer: Trevor Horn

Frankie Goes to Hollywood singles chronology
"Two Tribes" (1984)	"The Power of Love" (1984)	"Welcome to the Pleasuredome" (1985)

Music video
- "The Power of Love" on YouTube

"The Power of Love" is a 1984 single released by British band Frankie Goes to Hollywood which was written by Holly Johnson, Peter Gill, Mark O'Toole and Brian Nash. It was released on 19 November 1984 as the third single from the album Welcome to the Pleasuredome (1984).

The song, whose accompanying video depicts the Nativity of Jesus, has long been regarded as a Christmas song, despite having no reference to Christmas within the song lyrics. The single cover features the Assumption of the Virgin. The single spent one week at number one in the United Kingdom, being outsold only by "Do They Know It's Christmas?" by Band Aid.

== Background ==
"The Power of Love" (John Peel session)
An excerpt from the original John Peel session recording (1983).

The track was first featured during the John Peel sessions the band performed on during 1983, which was slower and emphasised the track's original camp ironic content (such as the Hooded Claw from the cartoon series The Perils of Penelope Pitstop). After recording at the original speed, ZTT/Trevor Horn sped it up, this also caused a change in pitch. "The Power of Love" became Frankie Goes to Hollywood's third consecutive (and last) UK number 1 single in December 1984. To commemorate the Christmas release, Godley & Creme directed a Nativity-themed video for the single, filmed outside Jerusalem, and the artwork for the single also used traditional Christian iconography. The original showing of the video on The Tube featured the Nativity occupying the whole screen, however the borders of band members were added for later showings due to pressure from UK broadcasters.

The 12" mix of the song featured actor Chris Barrie aping DJ Mike Read's banning of the single "Relax", as well as his impression of Ronald Reagan, instructing the listener in prayer. The single also featured a Christmas message from the band, entitled "Holier Than Thou".

On the cover is a reproduction of the Assumption of the Virgin by Titian, a 16th-century painting in the Basilica di Santa Maria Gloriosa dei Frari of Venice. The single has been reissued in various formats over the years. The 1993 reissue charted at number 10 in the UK; the 2000 remix version reached number 6.

Holly Johnson, who co-wrote the song, later reminisced: "I always felt like 'The Power of Love' was the record that would save me in this life. There is a biblical aspect to its spirituality and passion; the fact that love is the only thing that matters in the end".

== Release ==
"The Power of Love" followed its two predecessors, "Relax" and "Two Tribes", to the top of the UK singles chart. It scored the band an early December number-one, and was also a top 10 hit in several European countries, in Australia, in New Zealand, and in Canada. However, "The Power of Love" spent just one week at number one in the UK, outsold by the charity single "Do They Know It's Christmas?" by Band Aid, which until 1997 was the best selling single ever in the UK.

Since then, reissues and/or remixes of the Frankie Goes to Hollywood recording of this song have been top 10 UK hits on two other occasions, hitting number 10 in 1993 and number 6 in 2000. "The Power of Love" has also charted in the UK in a version by Holly Johnson (a solo recording from 1999). The original version by Frankie Goes to Hollywood was featured in the 2012 film Sightseers, the same year that the song was reissued as a digital download and peaked at number 42, in response to a cover version by Gabrielle Aplin. Her recording of the song also went to number 1 in the UK, exactly 28 years after the original Frankie Goes to Hollywood single topped the chart. A version sung by Connie Lush appears on the album 'Liverpool- The Number Ones Album' 2008 compilation which is top top version.

A version of "The Power of Love" was used as the theme song in the 2024 French/Italian movie "The Opera" produced by Placido Domingo and directed by Mario Compte.

== Critical reception ==
Richard Harris from NME wrote, "'The Power of Love' is too straight-laced (sic), but still drips with deep-pile quality (Holly Johnson had one of the great pop voices, don't forget)".

== Track listing ==
All discographical information here pertains to UK releases only (unless otherwise noted).

=== 7": ZTT / ZTAS 5 (United Kingdom) ===
1. "The Power of Love" (7" mix) - 5:27
2. "The World Is My Oyster" (7" mix) - 4:13

Also available as a picture disc carrying the same tracks. (PZTAS5)

=== 12": ZTT / 12 ZTAS 5 (United Kingdom) ===
1. "The Power of Love" (Extended version) - 9:28
2. "The World Is My Oyster" (Scrapped) - 1:38
3. "Holier Than Thou" (The first) - 1:08
4. "The World Is My Oyster" (Trapped) [Instrumental] - 2:29
5. "Holier Than Thou" (The second) - 4:10
6. "The Power of Love" (Instrumental) [Unlisted] - 2:27
- The cassette, 7" single and the standard 12" single were all released in a "hearts and crosses" cardboard envelope.
- "Holier Than Thou" is a recording of band members attempting to record a Christmas message for fans and generally messing about in the recording studio. The final song on the disc is the continuation of the instrumental version of "The Power of Love" that begins side A, here finally reaching its conclusion. This section of music actually begins during the final part of the "Holier Than Thou" section, when Peter Gill is jokingly listing what he wants for Christmas.
- Also released as a picture disc carrying the same tracks (12PZTAS5).

=== 12": ZTT / 12 XZTAS 5 (United Kingdom) ===
Pleasurefix Starfix

1. "The Power of Love" (7" mix) - 5:27
2. "The World Is My Oyster" (12" mix) - 4:23
3. "Welcome to the Pleasuredome" (Pleasure fix) - 9:46
4. "The Only Star in Heaven" (Star fix) - 3:52
- Released in a white gatefold sleeve with five photos.

=== MC: ZTT / CTIS 105 (United Kingdom) ===
1. "The Power of Love" (Extended, singlette version) - 9:18
2. "The World Is My Oyster (Scrapped)" - 1:38
3. "Holier Than Thou (the first)" - 1:08
4. "The World Is My Oyster (Trapped)" - 2:29
5. "Holier Than Thou (the second)" - 4:10
6. "The Power of Love" (Instrumental, singlette version) [Unlisted] - 3:30

This complete cassette was re-released in 2012 on CD Sexmix Disk 1 Tracks 7–12. The end of "Instrumental" is identical to the opening of the regular extended version, but with "Relax" in the background.

== Charts ==
=== Weekly charts ===
Chart (1984–1985)	Peak position
Australia (Kent Music Report)	4
Austria (Ö3 Austria Top 40)	8
Belgium (Ultratop 50 Flanders)	6
Canada Top Singles (RPM)	20
Finland (Suomen virallinen lista)	11
France (IFOP)	21
Iceland (RÚV)	1
Ireland (IRMA)	2
Italy (Musica e dischi)	3
Netherlands (Dutch Top 40)	9
Netherlands (Single Top 100)	10
New Zealand (Recorded Music NZ)	2
Spain (AFYVE)	6
Sweden (Sverigetopplistan)	14
Switzerland (Schweizer Hitparade)	2
UK Singles (Official Charts)	1
West Germany (GfK)	4

Chart (1993)	Peak position
UK Airplay (Music Week)	37

=== Year-end charts ===
Chart (1984)	Position
UK Singles (OCC)	16

Chart (1985)	Position
Australia (Kent Music Report)	58
Belgium (Ultratop 50 Flanders)	74
Netherlands (Dutch Top 40)	93
Switzerland (Schweizer Hitparade)	25
West Germany (Official German Charts)	43

== Certifications ==
Region	Certification	Certified units/sales
Germany (BVMI)	Gold	250,000^{‡}
Italy (FIMI)	Gold	15,000^{‡}
New Zealand (RMNZ)	Gold	15,000^{‡}
United Kingdom (BPI)	Platinum	600,000^{‡}
^{^} Shipments figures based on certification alone.^{‡} Sales+streaming figures based on certification alone.

== Holly Johnson version ==
"The Power of Love"

Single by Holly Johnson

from the album Soulstream
- Released: 13 December 1999
- Genre: Pop
- Length: 5:04
- Label: Pleasuredome
- Songwriters: Peter Gill; Holly Johnson; Mark O'Toole; Brian Nash
- Producer: Holly Johnson

Holly Johnson singles chronology
"Disco Heaven" (1999)	"The Power of Love" (1999)	"Follow Your Heart" (2014)

Music video
- "The Power of Love" on YouTube

Holly Johnson, former singer of Frankie Goes to Hollywood, recorded his own version of "The Power of Love" for his third studio album, Soulstream (1999). It was released as the third single from the album on 13 December 1999 and reached number 56 in the UK Singles Chart.

=== Background ===
Johnson was inspired to re-record "The Power of Love" as he felt that the Frankie Goes to Hollywood original was "too pompous and too much like one of those anthemic Queen songs". He told the Bristol Evening Post in 1999, "I wanted to record a version which was more from the heart, one which was more me and more in keeping with my personal taste, but it wasn't a question of trying to better it."

=== Music video ===
The song's original music video contained stock footage of Diana, Princess of Wales, which Johnson included as a tribute as he felt she "embodies love" and "brought so much love and hope to so many people in her life and death". The video was subsequently withdrawn after "several major TV shows expressed nervousness at the Princess Diana content". A new edit was then released, removing the footage of Diana and adding in additional live performance footage of Johnson.

=== Critical reception ===
Upon its release, Jon Perks of the Sunday Mercury criticised the single as a "Christmas cash-in" and noted, "Apart from the slightly altered spoken opener and a crisper sound, there's virtually nothing to separate it from the original." In a retrospective review of Soulstream, Jon O'Brien of AllMusic called the song an "unnecessary reworking" that "only highlight[s] the creative rut he appeared to be stuck in."

=== Track listing ===
CD single #1 (UK)

1. "The Power of Love" (Radio mix) - 5:08
2. "In the House of the Rising Sun" (12" definitive mix) - 5:36
3. "In the House of the Rising Sun" (Doogs House mix) - 5:04

CD single #2 (UK)

1. "The Power of Love" (Millennium mix) - 5:36
2. "In the House of the Rising Sun" (DNA instrumental mix) - 5:32
3. "All U Need Is Love" (Demo version) - 4:59

CD promotional single (UK)

1. "The Power of Love" (Radio mix) - 5:08
2. "The Power of Love" (Millennium mix) - 5:33
3. "In the House of the Rising Sun" (12" definitive mix) - 5:36
4. "In the House of the Rising Sun" (Doogs House mix) - 5:04
5. "In the House of the Rising Sun" (DNA instrumental mix) - 5:30

=== Charts ===
Chart (1999)	Peak position
UK Singles Chart	56

== Gabrielle Aplin version ==
"The Power of Love"

Single by Gabrielle Aplin

from the album English Rain
- Released: 9 November 2012
- Recorded: 2012
- Genre: Pop
- Length: 4:05
- Label: Parlophone
- Songwriters: Peter Gill; Holly Johnson; Mark O'Toole; Brian Nash
- Producers: Mike Spencer; David Kosten

Gabrielle Aplin singles chronology
"The Power of Love" (2012)	"Please Don't Say You Love Me" (2013)

In 2012, British singer-songwriter Gabrielle Aplin released a cover version of the song produced by Mike Spencer and David Kosten. It was released on 9 November 2012 as a digital download as the lead single from her debut studio album English Rain (2013). The song was selected as the soundtrack to the John Lewis 2012 Christmas advertisement. The song was also used during an episode of Hollyoaks: Enjoy the Ride on 16 November 2012 after the sudden death of one of the show's main characters, and Mary and Francis’s wedding in the TV show, Reign. The song subsequently became popular in Australia in early 2014.

=== Music video ===
A music video to accompany the release of "The Power of Love" was first released onto YouTube on 9 November 2012. It shows Aplin in a room in a large house, playing a piano. Then, near the end of the video, fairy lights in the room light up. The video was directed by Alexander Brown.

=== Track listing ===
Digital download
No.	Title	Length
1.	"The Power of Love"	4:05

=== Chart performance ===
On 11 November 2012 "The Power of Love" entered the UK Singles Chart at number 36, a week later it climbed to number 5. On 9 December 2012 the single reached number 1. Aplin's version was certified gold in the United Kingdom on 11 January 2013.

On 8 December 2013, the song re-charted at number 88 on the UK Singles Chart, due to downloads.

=== Charts ===
==== Weekly charts ====
Chart (2012–2014)	Peak position
Australia (ARIA)	5
Austria (Ö3 Austria Top 40)	75
Belgium (Ultratop 50 Flanders)	44
Belgium (Ultratip Bubbling Under Wallonia)	47
Czech Republic Airplay (ČNS IFPI)	22
Ireland (IRMA)	20
Scottish Singles Sales (Official Charts)	3
Slovakia Airplay (ČNS IFPI)	4
UK Singles (Official Charts)	1

==== Year-end charts ====
Chart (2012)	Position
UK Singles (OCC)	53

Chart (2014)	Position
Australia (ARIA)	92

=== Certifications ===
Region	Certification	Certified units/sales
Australia (ARIA)	Platinum	70,000^{^}
United Kingdom (BPI)	Platinum	600,000^{‡}
^{^} Shipments figures based on certification alone.^{‡} Sales+streaming figures based on certification alone.

=== Release history ===
Region	Date	Format	Label
United Kingdom	9 November 2012	Digital download	Parlophone
Ireland	9 November 2012	Digital download	Parlophone

== Dalton Harris version ==
"The Power of Love"

Single by Dalton Harris featuring James Arthur
- Released: 2 December 2018
- Recorded: November 2018
- Genre: Pop
- Label: Syco
- Songwriters: Peter Gill; Holly Johnson; Mark O'Toole; Brian Nash
- Producer: Graham Stack

Dalton Harris singles chronology
"Pauper" (2014)	"The Power of Love" (2018)	"Cry" (2019)

James Arthur singles chronology
"Rewrite the Stars" (2018)	"The Power of Love" (2018)	"Nobody" (2019)

In 2018, the Jamaican-British singer Dalton Harris, a contestant and eventual winner of the 15th series of the UK TV talent competition programme The X Factor, released the song as his winning song from the series. The song was in association with and featuring additional vocals by the same series' 9th season winner James Arthur, making it the second time the winning song UK X Factor is promoted as a duet or group performance rather than a solo performance by the winner, after the winners of 2017 when Rak-Su duetted with Wyclef Jean and Naughty Boy for their single entitled "Dimelo".

As in many earlier X Factor-winning releases, VAT collected on sales of the X Factor winner's charity song will be donated to children's charities, Together for Short Lives and Shooting Star Chase, declared the UK Chancellor of the Exchequer, Philip Hammond. The UK Department of Health and Social Care will make the donation of the VAT on the UK government's behalf. This is reportedly The X Factor UK's 11th charity release.

=== Charts ===
Chart (2018)	Peak position
Ireland (IRMA)	35
Poland Airplay (ZPAV)	94
Scottish Singles Sales (Official Charts)	1
UK Singles (Official Charts)	4

== Other cover versions ==
The song has been recorded by many other acts. Several Dutch heavy metal artists, including the lead singers of Nightwish, Epica and Within Temptation recorded a cover in support of the Red Cross aiding victims of sexual violence in war-zones. German band Oomph! also covered the song for their best-of album Delikatessen. Feeder also covered the song in 2002.
