= ZTT Records =

British record label

ZTT Zang Tumb Tuum
- ZTT Records logo
- Parent company: UMC (Universal Music catalogue)
- Founded: 1983
- Founder: Jill Sinclair; Trevor Horn; Paul Morley
- Distributor: Universal Music Operations
- Genre: Various
- Country of origin: United Kingdom
- Location: London
- Official website: ZTT.com

ZTT Records is a British record label founded in 1983 by the record producer Trevor Horn, the businesswoman Jill Sinclair and the NME music journalist Paul Morley. They released music by acts including Frankie Goes to Hollywood, Grace Jones, the Art of Noise and Seal.

In December 2017, Universal Music Group (UMG) acquired ZTT Records, along with Stiff Records. The ZTT and Stiff back catalogues were licensed to BMG Rights Management under Union Square Music until 2022, when Universal relaunched the label.

== History ==
ZTT is an initialism of Filippo Tommaso Marinetti's sound poem Zang Tumb Tumb, which described "zang tumb tumb" as the sound of a machine gun. It is believed that they likely got the idea for the name via John McGeoch, who produced the Swedish pop-funk band Zzzang Tumb's eponymous 1983 album around the same time as the label was founded.

The majority of the creative team at ZTT had first assembled when Horn produced the album The Lexicon of Love for the British pop band ABC. A precursor to ZTT was the short-lived Perfect Recordings label, spun off from the newly founded Perfect Songs publishing subsidiary of Trevor Horn and Jill Sinclair's company. Perfect Recordings only released the Buggles' Adventures in Modern Recording, along with the singles derived from it.

In 1983, Horn, Sinclair and Paul Morley founded ZTT Records. Sinclair was ZTT's managing director, while Morley concentrated on marketing. In the same year, Sinclair and Horn acquired Basing Street Studios from Island Records in exchange for distributing the ZTT label.

ZTT's first signing was Frankie Goes to Hollywood, whose hits "Relax" and "Two Tribes" were among the best-selling singles of the decade. "Relax" became the label's first number one single in January 1984, and stayed on the UK Singles Chart for a full year. During the 1980s, Grace Jones and Art of Noise were other ZTT acts to chart. ZTT also helped define the structure and formats of the UK pop music scene; as part of their marketing efforts to prolong the life of a single release, ZTT issued multiple 12" remixes which charted at positions in their own right as a separate 12" single. ZTT also licensed or produced T-shirts with graphic messages related to its artists' singles (eg. Frankie Say Arm the Unemployed), which themselves became 1980s icons.

In 1984, the Horn-Sinclair family businesses were reorganised as SPZ Group, which then consisted of Sarm West Studios, Perfect Songs, and ZTT Records. From the beginning, the majority of ZTT releases were published by Perfect Songs, and recorded at Sarm West Studios. The latter part of the decade was eclipsed by a bitter legal battle between ZTT and Holly Johnson, who fought his way out of the strict, long recording agreement. Similarly, other ZTT artists, such as Art of Noise and Propaganda, were disenchanted and left the label. Propaganda's case was settled out of court; Johnson won his outright.

By the late 1980s, ZTT began to focus on the emerging dance music scene. Manchester trance group 808 State would reach the top 10 with Pacific State, and three other singles and one album during the early 1990s. Seal was the next major ZTT act to emerge in the 1990s, and the label also achieved hits with MC Tunes and Shades of Rhythm.

ZTT Records have produced forty-five Top 40 hits in the United Kingdom, fifteen of which were Top 10 hits.

In May 2022, UMG released a new album by Propaganda vocalists Claudia Brücken and Susanne Freytag on the reactivated ZTT label. Credited to xPropaganda, The Heart Is Strange was recorded with producer Stephen Lipson, and received a generally positive reception.

== Music videos and cover art ==
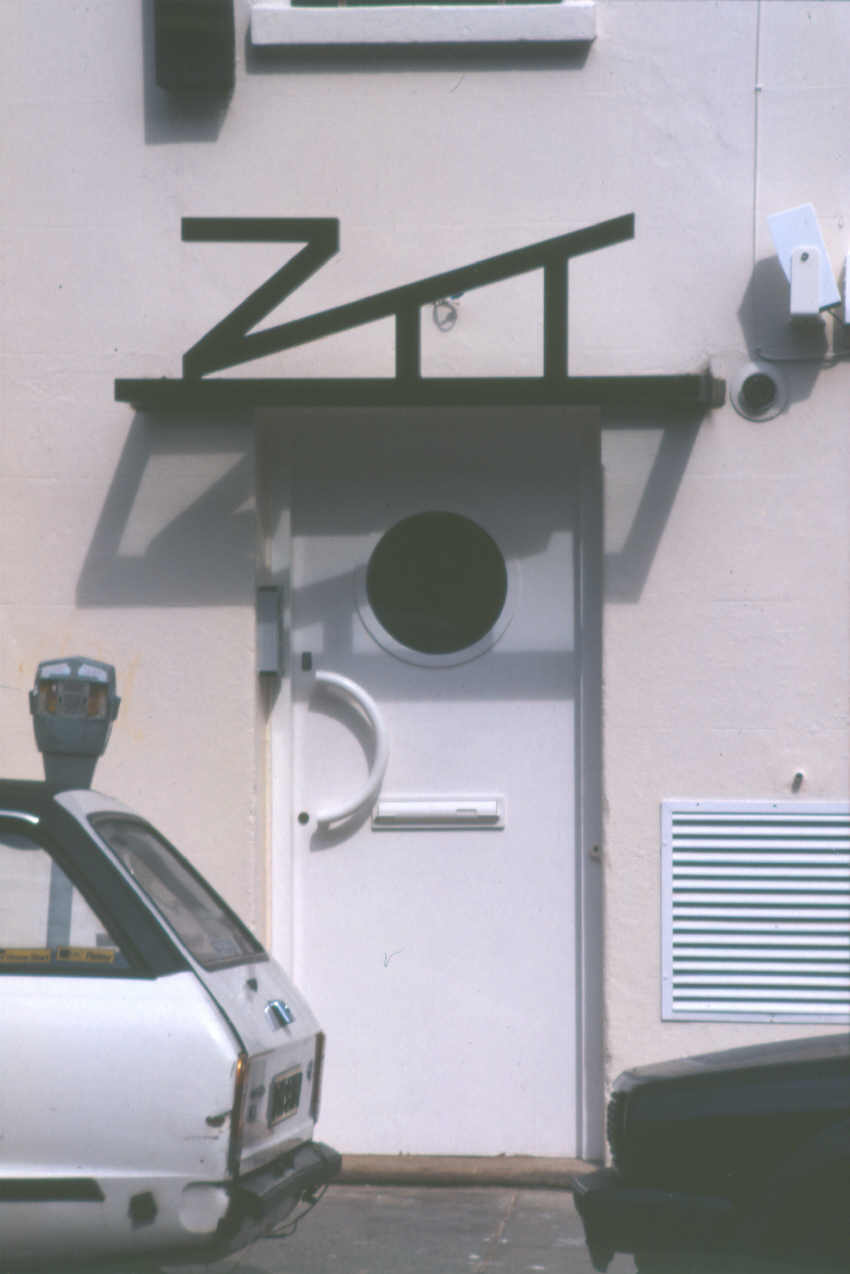
ZTT Records in London (1986)

ZTT Records pioneered music video and cover art as forms of high art in their own right. Morley commissioned videos from then-unknown directors, who would go on to become acclaimed in their field, such as Anton Corbijn and Zbigniew Rybczyński. Morley also commissioned early ZTT sleeve design and photography to pioneers of the medium such as Malcolm Garrett, Corbijn, Mark Farrow and Jean-Paul Goude.

The label's work in the visual field was profiled by Tony Enoch in Design Week, who positioned ZTT as "from a time when a record label meant something – a happening, a sense of belonging. Labels defined people's youth. Think Apple, Virgin, Beggar's Banquet, ZTT, and Stiff: small, independent British labels appearing to be able to do anything they wanted, reinventing the rules."

In 2008, journalist Ian Peel curated a first exhibition of ZTT sleeve art for galleries in London and Tokyo, and in 2013, he curated the visual archives of ZTT and Sarm West Studios before the studios were demolished. In 2009, Peel compiled a DVD of the labels' most acclaimed videos, entitled The Television Is Watching You, which received a British Board of Film Classification (BBFC) 15 Certificate.

== Notable acts on the ZTT label ==
1980s	1990s	2000s	2010s	2020s
ACT; Art of Noise; David Bedford; Das Psycho Rangers; Frankie Goes to Hollywood; Glenn Gregory & Claudia Brücken; Grace Jones; Stanley Myers; Nasty Rox Inc.; Roy Orbison; Anne Pigalle; Andrew Poppy; Propaganda; Hans Zimmer	Adamski's Thing; Afrika Bambaataa & The Soulsonic Force†; All Saints (as All Saints 1.9.7.5.); Dove; 808 State; The Frames; Glam Metal Detectives; The Heights of Abraham; Hoodlum Priest; The Image of a Group; Klymaxx; Shane MacGowan; Kirsty MacColl; MC Tunes; Seal; Sexus; Shades of Rhythm; Sun Electric; Tara; Tom Jones; Wendy & Lisa	David Jordan; Raging Speedhorn; Lisa Stansfield	A Theory; The Buggles; Femme; The Producers; Olivia Safe	xPropaganda

† as one-time UK distributor for Tommy Boy Records

== Action Series ==
As part of ZTT internal cataloguing of releases, they maintained two series; the Action Series, and the Incidental Series. The Action Series was issued mainly to singles and albums by a majority of the label's artists. However, to confuse matters, the series also contains a booklet and a concert.

The Action Series paused in 1988, and was restarted by record label manager Ian Peel in 2012.

Cat. No.	Artist	Title
AS1	Frankie Goes to Hollywood	"Relax"
AS2	Propaganda	"Dr. Mabuse"
AS3	Frankie Goes to Hollywood	"Two Tribes" / "War"
AS4	Frankie Goes to Hollywood	Welcome to the Pleasuredome (album)
AS5	Frankie Goes to Hollywood	"The Power of Love"
AS6	Frankie Goes to Hollywood	And Suddenly There Came a Bang! (booklet)
AS7	Frankie Goes to Hollywood	"Welcome to the Pleasuredome" (single)
AS8	Propaganda	"Duel"
AS9	Roy Orbison	"Wild Hearts"
AS10	Various	The Value of Entertainment (concert)
AS11	Art of Noise	Who's Afraid of the Art of Noise?
AS12	Propaganda	"p:Machinery"
AS13	Propaganda	A Secret Wish
AS14	Various	The Shape of the Universe, Original Soundtrack
AS15	Glenn Gregory & Claudia Brücken	"When Your Heart Runs Out of Time"
AS16	Grace Jones	Slave to the Rhythm (A Biography)
AS17	Andrew Poppy	The Beating of Wings
AS18	Various	Zang Tuum Tumb Sampled
AS19	Anne Pigalle	Everything Could Be So Perfect...
AS20	Propaganda	Wishful Thinking
AS21	Propaganda	"p:Machinery (Reactivated)"
AS22	Frankie Goes to Hollywood	"Rage Hard"
AS23	Frankie Goes to Hollywood	Liverpool
AS24	Das Psycho Rangers	Starve God There's Choice
AS25	Frankie Goes to Hollywood	"Warriors of the Wasteland"
AS26	Frankie Goes to Hollywood	"Watching the Wildlife"
AS27	Andrew Poppy	Alphabed (A Mystery Dance)
AS28	Act	"Snobbery and Decay"

== See also ==
- Lists of record labels
- List of electronic music record labels
- List of independent UK record labels
