= Paul Lester =

British journalist

Paul Lester is a British music journalist, author and broadcaster from Elstree, Hertfordshire.

== Career ==
He began his career as a freelance journalist, for Melody Maker in the early 1990s, as well as City Limits, 20/20, Sky Magazine and The Jewish Chronicle. He covered grunge, shoegaze, Madchester and Britpop, also spending time with bands touring the UK and internationally.

In 1993, Lester became Melody Maker's features editor; then in 1997, left to join Allan Jones in launching monthly music and film magazine Uncut, remaining deputy editor until 2006.

Lester has written more than a dozen rock / pop biographies, co-authored the Virgin Encyclopedia of Albums and often appears as a radio / television music pundit. He has interviewed hundreds of thespians and musicians including Kylie Minogue, Janet Jackson, Mick Jagger and Snoop Dogg. He has also written sleeve notes on many, including: Todd Rundgren, Hall & Oates, The Smiths and The Sex Pistols.

He currently resides in Hertfordshire, from where he has been freelancing since January 2007. He contributes newspapers, including : Guardian (daily columnist of 'Critics Picks' and 'New Band of the Day'), The Sunday Times, the Daily Express, The Mail on Sunday, The Daily Telegraph and The Scotsman. He writes of other periodicals, including: Q (magazine), GQ, Record Collector and The Jewish Chronicle (an autobiographical column about recently remarried life, as a father of three children).

In July 2011, he joined digital station Amazing Radio to present a weekly show dedicated to new music. The programme continues to broadcast on Thursday afternoons between 1 and 3pm, on the national Digital One network in the UK and online via amazingradio.co.uk and the UK RadioPlayer.

In 2018, Lester became the editor of Record Collector magazine.

== Bibliography ==
=== Books ===
- Lester, Paul (1995). Oasis : the illustrated story. London: Hamlyn.
- — (1996). Oasis : the illustrated story. New ed. London: Hamlyn.
- Blur: The Illustrated Story (Paperback). Pyramid, May 1995, ISBN 978-0-600-58689-0
- Pulp: The Illustrated Story (Paperback). Hamlyn, Feb 1996, ISBN 978-0-600-58974-7
- Björk: The Illustrated Story (Paperback). Hamlyn, Aug 1996, ISBN 978-0-600-59067-5
- Spice Girls: The Illustrated Story (Paperback). Hamlyn, Feb 1997, ISBN 978-0-600-59255-6
- Kula Shaker: The Illustrated Story (Paperback). Hamlyn, Mar 1997, ISBN 978-0-600-59270-9
- The Prodigy: The Illustrated Story (Paperback). Hamlyn, Nov 1997, ISBN 978-0-600-59511-3
- The Encyclopedia of Albums (co-authored with Chris Roberts) (Paperback). Dempsey Parr, 1998, ISBN 978-1-84084-031-5
- The Verve: The Illustrated Story (Paperback). Hamlyn. Jun 1998, ISBN 978-0-600-59592-2
- Robbie Williams: The Illustrated Story (Paperback). Hamlyn, Oct 1998, ISBN 978-0-600-59746-9
- Gang of Four: Damaged Gods (Paperback). Omnibus Press, Sep 2008, ISBN 978-1-84772-245-4
- Lowdown: The Story of Wire (Paperback). Omnibus Press, May 2009, ISBN 978-1-84772-710-7
- Pink: Split Personality (Paperback). Omnibus Press, November 2009, ISBN 978-1-84938-060-7

=== Album reviews ===
Album title	Artist	Reviewed in
Sacred songs	Daryl Hall	Lester, Paul (December 2014). "Consecration piece". Buried Treasure. Mojo. 253 (6): 114.

== Awards ==
In 2008, Lester won the 'Breaking Music Writer' award at the Record of The Day Awards for Music Journalism and PR for his 'New Band of the Day' column in The Guardian.
