= Frankie Goes to Hollywood =

English pop band

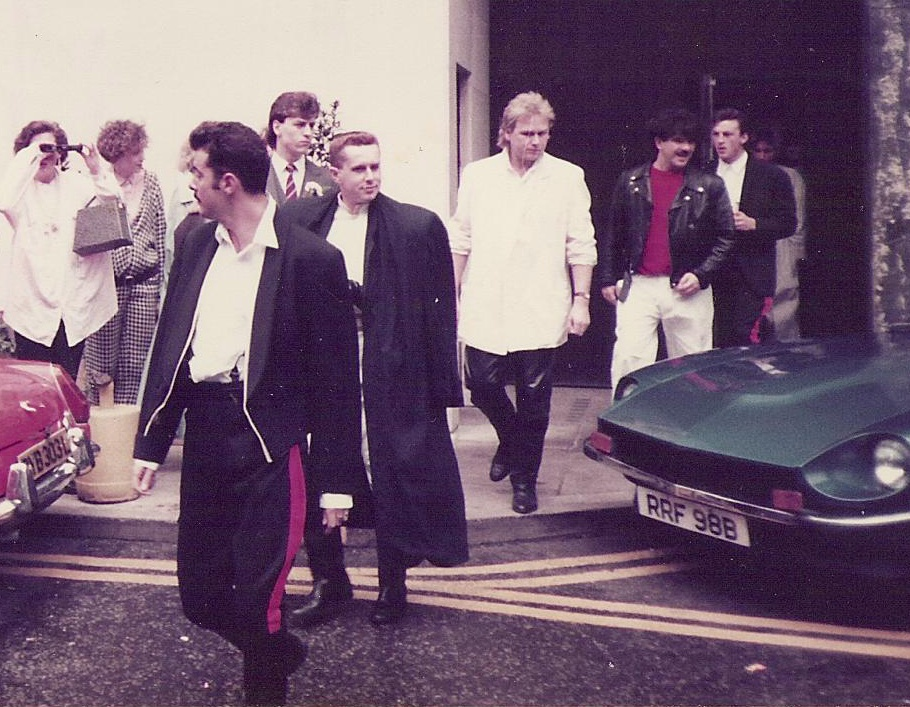
- Frankie Goes to Hollywood in 1985. From front: Paul Rutherford, Holly Johnson, Brian Nash, Peter Gill and Mark O'Toole

Background information
- Origin: Liverpool, England
- Genres: Hi-NRG; disco; new pop; dance-pop; new wave
- Works: Frankie Goes to Hollywood discography
- Years active: 1980–1987; 2004–2007; 2023
- Labels: ZTT; Island
- Past members: Holly Johnson; Peter Gill; Mark O'Toole; Jed O'Toole; Paul Rutherford; Brian Nash; Ryan Molloy

Frankie Goes to Hollywood were an English pop band that formed in Liverpool in 1980. They comprised Holly Johnson (vocals), Paul Rutherford (backing vocals), Mark O'Toole (bass), Brian Nash (guitar) and Peter Gill (drums). Johnson and Rutherford were among the first openly gay pop singers, and Frankie Goes to Hollywood made gay rights and sexuality a theme of their music and performances.

Frankie Goes to Hollywood signed to ZTT Records in 1983. Their debut album, Welcome to the Pleasuredome (1984), produced by Trevor Horn, achieved advance sales of more than a million, and their first three singles, "Relax", "Two Tribes" and "The Power of Love", reached number one on the UK singles chart. The BBC briefly banned them from broadcast for their provocative themes, drawing further publicity. In 2014, the music journalist Paul Lester wrote that "no band has dominated a 12-month period like Frankie ruled 1984".

Johnson, Gill and O'Toole received the 1984 Ivor Novello Award for Best Song Musically and Lyrically for "Two Tribes". In 1985, Frankie Goes to Hollywood won the Brit Award for British Breakthrough Act and were nominated for Best New Artist at the Grammy Awards and MTV Video Music Awards.

Frankie Goes to Hollywood's second album, Liverpool (1986), sold fewer copies, and they disbanded acrimoniously in 1987. Johnson successfully sued ZTT to leave his contract and began a solo career. He declined invitations to reunite and tried to block the band from using the name. In 2004, Frankie Goes to Hollywood reunited without Johnson and Nash to perform at a Prince's Trust charity concert, with Ryan Molloy on vocals, and held a tour in 2005. They reunited with Johnson and Nash for the first time since 1987 to perform for the 2023 Eurovision Song Contest.

== History ==
=== 1980–1983: Formation ===
Frankie Goes to Hollywood formed in Liverpool in 1980. The lead singer, Holly Johnson, had previously played in Big in Japan and had released some unsuccessful solo singles. He formed the first version of Frankie Goes to Hollywood with musicians including Ambrose Reynolds, but the group soon split. The name came from an advertisement announcing Frank Sinatra's film debut.

In 1982, Johnson restarted Frankie Goes to Hollywood with Peter Gill (drums) and the brothers Mark (bass) and Jed O'Toole (guitar). Jed left before 1983, and was replaced by his cousin, Brian Nash. Within the band, O'Toole, Nash and Gill constituted a group known as the Lads. Frankie Goes to Hollywood played their first gig at a Liverpool pub, Pickwick's, where they recruited the dancer and backing singer Paul Rutherford.

Nash said the band admired the Liverpool groups Echo & the Bunnymen, Orchestral Manoeuvres in the Dark and the Teardrop Explodes: "That was music from Liverpool but from our generation. You would see these people walking around town, you'd see Ian McCulloch getting on the bus. I never saw any of the Beatles on the bus." Johnson said he wanted the band to be provocative and modern, merging punk and disco, and was inspired by the media impact of bands such as the Sex Pistols and Bow Wow Wow.

=== 1983–1984: "Relax", "Two Tribes" and success ===
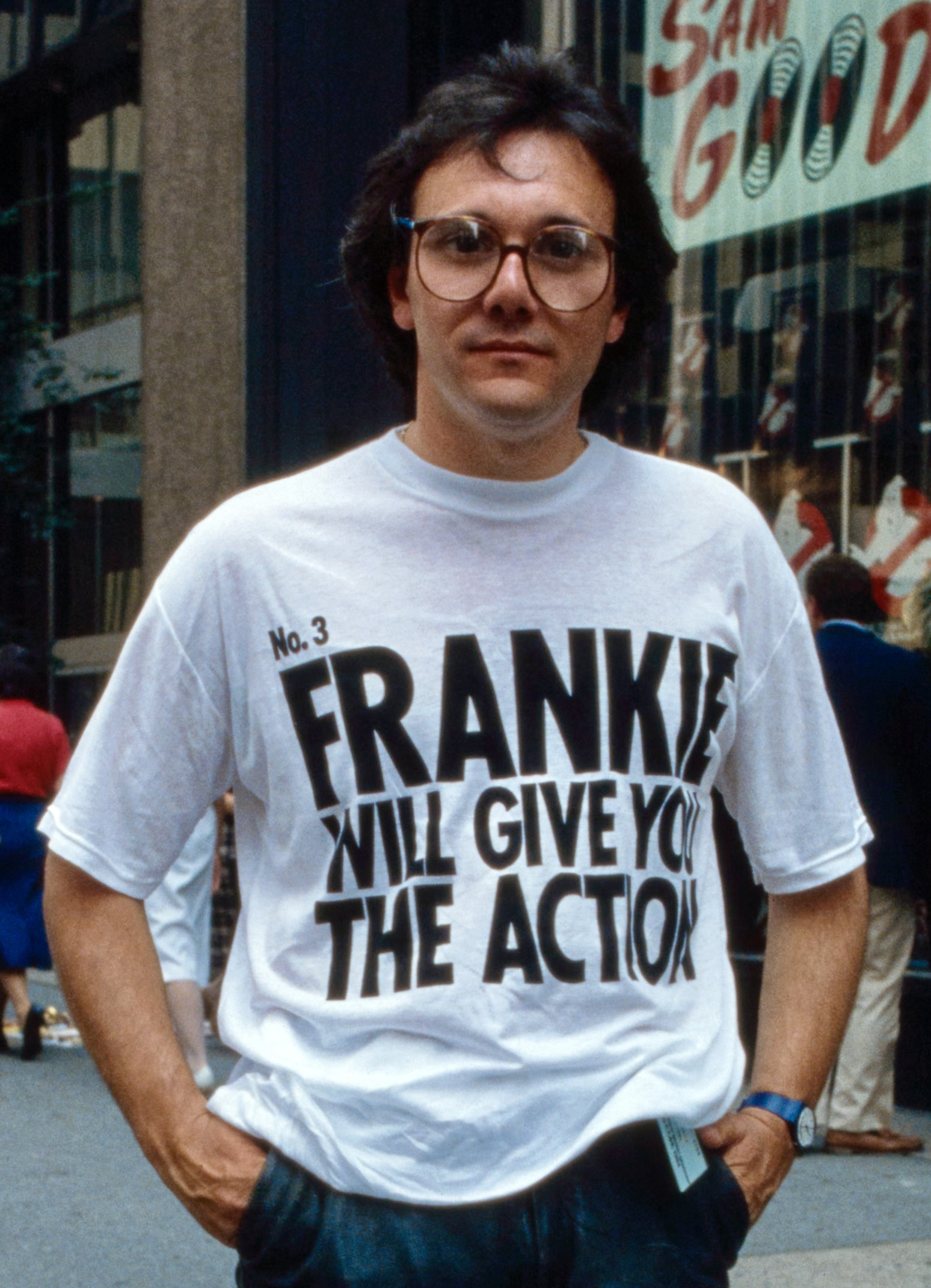
Trevor Horn, pictured in 1984 wearing a Frankie Goes to Hollywood shirt, signed the band to ZTT and produced their first album.

In February 1983, Frankie Goes to Hollywood performed on the Channel 4 show The Tube, dressed in fetish wear. Johnson said the "extreme" look was a means of attracting industry attention, but that many labels were afraid to sign them. That May, Frankie Goes to Hollywood became the first act signed by ZTT Records, a new record label co-founded by the producer Trevor Horn. Horn admired the "dangerous" sexuality of their music. Johnson said they turned down an offer from Beggars Banquet Records as they wanted to work with Horn.

"Relax" was selected as the first single. After recording several versions, Horn created a dramatically different arrangement without the band, using electronic instruments such as a drum machine and the Fairlight, an early sampling synthesiser. It was released in October 1983, backed by a music video set in an S&M club. Sound on Sound described it as a "hi-NRG brand of dance-synth-pop" that "broke new sonic ground, while epitomising '80s excess in all its garish, overblown glory". Initial sales were slow, but rose after the band performed on the BBC series Top of the Pops the following January. Soon after, the BBC banned "Relax" from its broadcasts, deeming it obscene. The ban created publicity, associating Frankie Goes to Hollywood with youth rebellion. Within two weeks, "Relax" reached number one on the UK singles chart and stayed there for five weeks, and the BBC was forced to reverse its ban. "Relax" won the 1985 Brit Award for Best British Single.

The ZTT co-founder Paul Morley devised a promotional campaign involving "advertising-based slogans, playful propaganda and pseudo-philosophy". This included a line of T-shirts inspired by shirts created by Katharine Hamnett, bearing slogans such as "Frankie say relax" and "Frankie say arm the unemployed". Morley said he wanted to challenge the idea of music merchandise, asking: "Why did it have to have a face on it, couldn't it be a walking billboard?" The shirts quickly became popular, and Music Week reported in July 1984 that they were outselling the singles in some stores. By December, more than 250,000 T-shirts had been sold.

Frankie Goes to Hollywood appeared in the 1984 thriller Body Double by Brian De Palma. In June, Frankie Goes to Hollywood released their second single, "Two Tribes", featuring an "annihilating" bassline and lyrics about the Cold War. Its music video, depicting a fight between Ronald Reagan and Konstantin Chernenko, was played extensively on MTV. The single spent nine weeks at number one on the UK singles chart. Frankie Goes to Hollywood held the top two spots of the chart simultaneously when "Relax" rose back to number two that August.

=== 1984–1985: Welcome to the Pleasuredome ===
Frankie Goes to Hollywood released their debut album, Welcome to the Pleasuredome, featuring "Relax" and "Two Tribes", in October 1984. It had advance sales of a million copies. A third single, the ballad "The Power of Love", was released in November and reached number one in December. This made Frankie Goes to Hollywood the second act in the history of the UK charts to reach number one with their first three singles, after another Liverpool band, Gerry and the Pacemakers, in the 1960s. This record remained unbeaten until the Spice Girls achieved a six-single streak in 1996–1997. Writing in the Guardian in 2014, Paul Lester wrote that "no band has dominated a 12-month period like Frankie ruled 1984". As of 2014, "Relax" and "Two Tribes" were the sixth and 22nd-bestselling singles in UK history.

In 1985, Frankie Goes to Hollywood won the Brit Award for British Breakthrough Act. In the US, where they were associated with the Second British Invasion, they received nominations for Best New Artist at the 27th Annual Grammy Awards and the 1985 MTV Video Music Awards. Their fourth single, "Welcome to the Pleasuredome", was released in March 1985, and reached number two. That year, Ocean Software published a Frankie Goes to Hollywood game for the Commodore 64, Amstrad CPC and ZX Spectrum. The player completes a series of minigames to solve a murder mystery, with references to the band's lyrics, videos and artwork.

=== 1985–1987: Liverpool and decline ===
By the end of 1984, following promotional touring in the US, Johnson had distanced himself from the band. He spent time with his new boyfriend, Wolfgang Kuhle, who later became his manager. In 1985, Frankie Goes to Hollywood left the UK for a year for tax purposes and wrote songs for their second album in Ireland. The media reported that disputes had formed within the band. They began recording their second album, Liverpool, in Wisseloord Studios, near Amsterdam, in November 1985. Between March and June 1986, they worked in ZTT's studio Sarm West in London. Liverpool was produced by the ZTT engineer Stephen Lipson; Horn took over mixing in its final stages.

Johnson remained distant during the sessions and was unhappy about the focus on rock over dance. Jill Sinclair, Horn's wife and one of the ZTT founders, later alleged that Johnson had been uncooperative and absent for most of the sessions. Johnson said later that "some of us were having mental breakdowns because of the intensity of the last couple of years". According to Nash, the Duran Duran singer Simon Le Bon declined an invitation to replace Johnson. Pete Wylie was also approached, but Johnson remained and completed Liverpool.

In August 1986, the first single from Liverpool, "Rage Hard", was released, reaching number four in the UK. Liverpool was released in October 1986 and reached number five. It received poor reviews, and chart returns declined rapidly with the singles "Warriors of the Wasteland" (which reached number 19) and "Watching the Wildlife" (number 28). Horn spent three months creating remixes for the singles, spending an estimated £50,000. By March 1988, Liverpool had sold around 800,000 copies.

=== 1987–1989: disbandment and lawsuit ===
During the Liverpool tour, the relationship between Johnson and the band deteriorated. Before a concert at Wembley Arena in January, a fight broke out backstage between Johnson and O'Toole. Johnson said ZTT had encouraged the rift as a means of divide and rule, and that Horn had once suggested Johnson and Rutherford fire the other members and work as a duo. Sinclair instead blamed Johnson's manager and boyfriend, Kuhle, who she said was a negative influence and had triggered resentment in the band. Nash recalled: "During the last tour, everybody knew it would end, as the relationship between Holly and the rest of us was so strained. He didn't want to be in a band situation anymore. Everybody was fed up with the whole thing." Their last concert was on 1 March 1987, at Rotterdam Ahoy in the Netherlands.

On 23 July, Johnson told ZTT that he planned to leave and sign to MCA Records. ZTT filed an injunction to prevent this, as their record contract specified that any member who left would remain contracted to ZTT. In court, ZTT argued that the success of Frankie Goes to Hollywood was a result of ZTT's production and marketing and that Johnson had been disruptive and uncooperative. Johnson's team argued that ZTT had been financially irresponsible when recording Liverpool, and that their contract constituted an unreasonable restraint of trade. In 1988, the High Court found in Johnson's favour and the band members were released from their contract. Horn later wrote that his decision to pursue the lawsuit had been "stupid". Johnson said ZTT had believed that "they were the ones with the talent, and we were just five oiks from a provincial town to front their genius".

Soon after the breakup, Nash, O'Toole and Gill attempted to re-form Frankie Goes to Hollywood with a new singer, Grant Boult. According to Nash, they recorded songs in a deal with London Records. Johnson blocked the project, saying it would devalue their achievements.

=== 1989–1998: solo projects ===
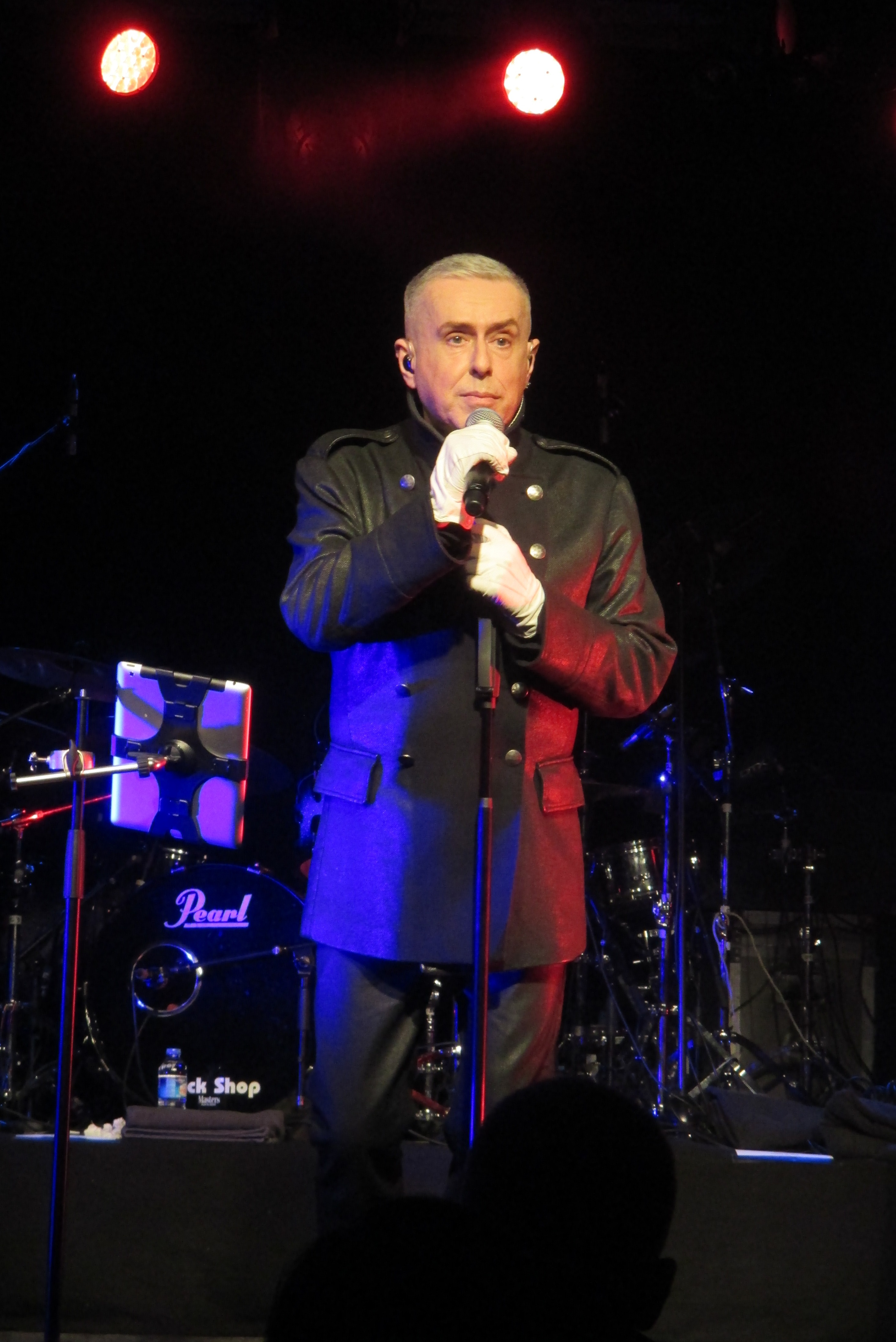
Holly Johnson performing solo in 2014

Johnson began a solo career with MCA, and released a number-one album, Blast, in 1989. His second solo album, Dreams That Money Can't Buy, released in 1991, was unsuccessful. That year, Johnson was diagnosed with HIV and retreated from public life to focus on his health. In 1994, he published an autobiography, A Bone in My Flute. He has since released further albums and studied at the Royal College of Art.

Nash returned to work as an electrician, and signed to Swanyard Records to record music with Boult as Low. He later became an officiator of weddings and funerals and a tour guide of Liverpool's musical heritage. He published a memoir, Nasher Says Relax, in 2012. O'Toole moved to Los Angeles, where he wrote music, and later moved to Florida. Gill toured as part of an Australian soap actor's band, and formed a music production company, Love Station, which released singles featuring vocalists including Lisa Hunt.

Rutherford released a single, a cover of the Chic track "I Want Your Love", and an album, Oh World, in 1989, which were unsuccessful. He released the single "That Moon" with Pressure Zone in 1991, and worked as a stylist for bands. He also appeared in the music videos for "Walking on Broken Glass" (1992) by Annie Lennox and "Give in to Me" (1993) by Michael Jackson. He later moved to New Zealand.

=== 1998–2003: American impostor band ===
In 1998, a band using the name Frankie Goes to Hollywood began to tour the United States. They were led by an American using the stage name Davey Johnson, who claimed he was Holly's brother and had performed uncredited on Welcome to the Pleasuredome. Horn and the members of Frankie Goes to Hollywood refuted both claims. O'Toole, who had been living in Florida, became aware of the impostor band and warned concert promoters not to hire them.

The Flock of Seagulls frontman Mike Score, who had been a Liverpool acquaintance of the members of Frankie Goes to Hollywood, removed the impostor band from his tour. After Johnson contacted the trade magazine Pollstar to confirm that the act was unauthorised, they were dropped by a booking agent, but were booked by small clubs throughout the southern United States. In September 2000, Spin published a feature on the incident. That year, ZTT released a Frankie Goes to Hollywood greatest-hits compilation, Maximum Joy, featuring remixes by acts including Apollo 440.

=== 2003–2011: reunion, performances with Ryan Molloy and trademark dispute ===
The members of Frankie Goes to Hollywood reunited in Holloway, London, for a 2003 episode of the VH1 show Bands Reunited, but did not perform. In an interview the following year, Johnson said he had not wanted to perform with the band again and felt the episode was a "debacle". In his 2012 memoir, Nash, who had also been uninterested in a reunion, described the VH1 episode as a "circus" that had tried to depict Johnson negatively.

On 11 November 2004, Frankie Goes to Hollywood reunited without Johnson and Nash to perform at a Prince's Trust charity concert at Wembley Arena celebrating Horn's 25 years as a record producer. Johnson and Nash declined to take part. In his memoir, Nash wrote that he gave the band his blessing and watched from the audience. Following open auditions held on 31 October in Leicester Square, London, Ryan Molloy was selected as the new vocalist. O'Toole's brother Jed, who had played in the band in the 1980s, replaced Nash.

PopMatters wrote that the Wembley performance had "unstoppable 1984 pop glory" and that "even strong detractors of the group would likely be won over by energy the band members radiate". The Independent wrote that it "fell somewhat flat". Writing in The Guardian, Alexis Petridis wrote that the show "ultimately underwhelms" and that the songs "were designed as studio-bound production extravaganzas, not live showstoppers". Nash praised the performance and wrote that "Molloy did a great job filling Holly's shoes". In his memoir, Horn wrote that Molloy was "a hell of a good frontman".

The Wembley performance was followed by a series of concerts across Europe in 2005, including at Northampton Balloon Festival, and Big Gay Out in Finsbury Park, London. In 2006, Molloy said he had written new songs for Frankie Goes to Hollywood. However, the material went unreleased and a European tour was cancelled. The group remained active until 2007 using the name Forbidden Hollywood, as Johnson would not allow them to use the original name.

In April 2004, Johnson attempted to register the name Frankie Goes to Hollywood as a trademark for his exclusive use, arguing that it was his intellectual property as he had used it for a previous band. The other band members opposed the registration. In 2007, it was blocked by an Intellectual Property Office judge, who ruled that Johnson had acted in bad faith in an attempt to prevent the band performing without him.

=== 2011–2023: reissues, reunion and film ===
In 2011, ZTT reissued Liverpool in an expanded edition, plus The Art of the 12", a compilation of tracks from ZTT artists including Frankie Goes to Hollywood. In 2017, Universal Music purchased ZTT, including the Frankie Goes to Hollywood back catalogue.

On 7 May 2023, Frankie Goes to Hollywood, including Johnson and Nash, reunited for a concert featuring several acts celebrating Liverpool music for the Eurovision Song Contest. They performed one song, "Welcome to the Pleasuredome". It was their first performance together since 1987. The performance drew praise but disappointed those hoping for more songs. The Telegraph gave the concert three out of five, writing that Johnson remained "a commanding presence" but that Frankie Goes to Hollywood's short set was disappointing. The BBC wrote: "Maybe one song is as much time as the five band members can bear to share a stage for—but at least they proved that they and their music can still sound compelling and fresh." In 2025, Johnson said he had contemplated another reunion but that the idea "seems to have gone away".

On 10 May 2023, Working Title Films announced it was developing a Frankie Goes to Hollywood biographical film, Relax, based on Johnson's memoir. Bernard Rose, the director of the first "Relax" music video, is set to direct, with Callum Scott Howells as Johnson.

== Style and legacy ==
Johnson and Rutherford are openly gay, and Frankie Goes to Hollywood made gay rights and sexuality a theme of their music and performances. They were connected to a rise in gay culture in 1980s Britain, alongside bands such as Bronski Beat. Morley said that Frankie Goes to Hollywood combined the "exploratory gay energy" of Johnson and Rutherford with the "heterosexual scouse energy" of the other band members. Bernard Rose, who directed the first "Relax" video, said Frankie Goes to Hollywood were the first openly gay major pop act, before gay artists such as Boy George, George Michael, Freddie Mercury or Elton John had come out, and "caused a shockwave".

As Frankie Goes to Hollywood rose in popularity, some outlets reported that they were a "manufactured" group controlled by ZTT. A 1984 article in the Washington Post described them as "a modern-day Monkees, a post-punk Village People sprung forth fully armed from the brow of junk culture". As only Johnson performed on the studio version of "Relax", and the band did not tour at the height of their popularity, rumours spread that they could not play their instruments. Johnson said the media had undermined them and underestimated their contributions to their records. Horn said later that the British music media often misunderstood the processes involved in studio recording. He said the band were "better than people gave them credit for", and cited "The Power of Love", "Born to Run" and "Krisco Kisses" as examples of their playing on Welcome to the Pleasuredome.

In 2014, the music journalist Paul Lester wrote that although Frankie Goes to Hollywood were "arguably the last great British pop sensation", other acts rarely cited them as an influence, which he argued was because they are impossible to recreate. Morley observed that despite having released two of the most successful records of the 1980s, they had become "slightly lost ... The fact that something was so successful yet is part of a shadowy history is ultimate proof that it was special. They were like some contorted, profound novelty band." However, he argued that they had changed how commercial pop music was marketed, with more artistic and "beautiful" packaging and music videos.

== Personnel ==
- Holly Johnson – vocals (1980–1987, 2023)
- Mark O'Toole – bass, vocals (1981–1987, 2004–2007, 2023)
- Peter Gill – drums (1981–1987, 2004–2007, 2023)
- Jed O'Toole – guitars, vocals (1981–1982, 2004–2007)
- Paul Rutherford – vocals, keyboards, tambourine (1982–1987, 2004–2007, 2023)
- Brian Nash – guitars, vocals (1982–1987, 2023)
- Ryan Molloy – vocals (2004–2007)

== Awards and nominations ==
Year	Awards	Work	Category	Result
1984	Ivor Novello Awards	"Two Tribes"	Best Song Musically And Lyrically	Won
1984	NME Awards	"Two Tribes"	Promo Video	Won
1984	NME Awards	Welcome to the Pleasuredome	Best Dressed Sleeve	Won
1984	NME Awards	"Relax"	Best Single	Won
1985	Ivor Novello Awards	"Relax"	Best Contemporary Song	Nominated
1985	Brit Awards	"Relax"	Best British Single	Won
1985	Brit Awards	Themselves	Best British Newcomer	Won
1985	Brit Awards	Themselves	Best British Group	Nominated
1985	Brit Awards	Welcome to the Pleasuredome	Best British Album	Nominated
1985	Brit Awards	"Two Tribes"	Best British Single	Nominated
1985	MTV Video Music Awards	"Two Tribes"	Best New Artist	Nominated
1985	MTV Video Music Awards	"Two Tribes"	Best Concept Video	Nominated
1985	Pollstar Concert Industry Awards	Themselves	Which Artist is Most Likely to Successfully Headline Arenas for the First time in 1985?	Nominated
1986	Pollstar Concert Industry Awards	Tour	Small Hall/Club Tour of the Year	Nominated
2010	Q Awards	"Relax"	Classic Song	Won

== Discography ==
- Welcome to the Pleasuredome (1984)
- Liverpool (1986)

== Concert tours ==
- English Tour (1983)
- North American-English "Welcome to the Pleasuredome" Tour (1984)
- British-European-North American-Japanese Tour (1985)
- British-European "Liverpool" Tour (1987)
- European-British "Reunion" Tour (2005)
