= Relax (song) =

1983 single by Frankie Goes to Hollywood

Single by Frankie Goes to Hollywood

from the album Welcome to the Pleasuredome
- B-side: "One September Monday"; "Ferry 'Cross the Mersey"
- Released: 24 October 1983
- Recorded: 1983
- Studio: Sarm West (London)
- Genre: New pop; synth-pop; Hi-NRG; dance-pop; new wave
- Length: 3:54 (7" single mix); 3:55 (Come Fighting/album version); 16:24 (sex mix); 8:20 (sex mix edit); 7:25 (New York mix); 3:55 (classic 1993 version)
- Label: ZTT; Island
- Songwriters: Peter Gill; Holly Johnson; Brian Nash; Mark O'Toole
- Producer: Trevor Horn

Frankie Goes to Hollywood singles chronology
"Relax" (1983)	"Two Tribes" (1984)

Music videos
- "Relax" (Bernard Rose) on YouTube
- "Relax" (Laser) on YouTube
- "Relax" (Body Double) on YouTube

"Relax" is the debut single by English band Frankie Goes to Hollywood, released in the United Kingdom by ZTT Records in 1983. Produced by Trevor Horn and featuring the band along with other musicians, entered the UK Top 75 singles chart in November 1983 but did not crack the Top 40 until early January 1984. Three weeks later it reached number one, on the chart dated 28 January 1984, replacing Paul McCartney's "Pipes of Peace". One of the decade's most controversial and most commercially successful records, "Relax" eventually sold a reported two million copies in the UK alone, easily ranking among the ten biggest-selling singles in the UK. It remained in the UK Top 40 for 37 consecutive weeks, 35 of which overlapped with a radio airplay ban by the BBC (owing to lyrics perceived as overtly sexual).

In June 1984, bolstered by the instant massive success of the band's follow-up single "Two Tribes", the single re-entered the Top Ten for a further nine weeks, including two spent at no. 2 (behind "Two Tribes"). At that time, Frankie Goes to Hollywood were the only act apart from the Beatles and John Lennon to concurrently occupy the top two positions on the chart. Several 12-inch single versions (and the "Frankie Say Relax" T-shirt craze) further fed the "Relax" phenomenon. The single re-entered the UK Top 75 in February 1985 and, more successfully, in October 1993, when it spent three weeks in the Top Ten. "Relax" remains the UK's biggest-selling debut single of all time.

In the United States "Relax" was also comparatively slow in reaching its chart peak. Released in March 1984, albeit with a different mix and nearly a minute shorter in length, the single stalled at no. 67 on Billboard's Hot 100 in May during a seven-week run, but it ranked number one for the year on the Los Angeles "alternative rock" station KROQ, as voted for by listeners. In January 1985, a release of "Relax" that was far more similar to the UK hit version entered the Hot 100 at no. 70, and in March it reached no. 10 during its 16-week run. In January 1989, the single was certified gold by the RIAA.

In February 1985, the record was awarded Best British Single of 1984 at the Brit Awards, and Frankie Goes to Hollywood won Best British Newcomer. A version of the song features on Frankie Goes to Hollywood's debut album Welcome to the Pleasuredome, released in October 1984.

== Background and recording ==
"Relax" (demo)
An excerpt from the original demo recording of "Relax", starting with the bridge that was removed in later versions

Frankie Goes to Hollywood formed in Liverpool in 1980. The singer, Holly Johnson, said he wrote "Relax" in his head, and that the lyrics came to him as he was walking down Princes Avenue in Liverpool. In February 1983, the band performed an early version of "Relax" on the Channel 4 show The Tube, dressed in fetish wear. This version included a bridge that incorporated lyrics from the song In Heaven from David Lynch's film Eraserhead.

That May, Frankie Goes to Hollywood became the first act signed by ZTT Records, a new record label co-founded by the producer Trevor Horn, who saw their Tube performance. "Relax" was selected as their first single. Horn described the original version as "more a jingle than a song", but he preferred to work with songs that were not professionally finished because he could rework them in his own style.

== Production ==
Horn dominated the recording of "Relax" in his effort for perfectionism. Initial sessions were held at the Manor Studio. The band were overawed and intimidated by Horn's reputation, and were too nervous to make suggestions. Johnson said in his autobiography, "Whatever he said we went along with".

According to Horn, the "Relax" demo featured the guitarist Jed O'Toole, the brother of the bassist, Mark O'Toole. By the time Frankie Goes to Hollywood signed to ZTT, Jed had been replaced by Brian Nash. Though he acknowledged that Nash later became a good guitarist, he felt he was not skilled enough, and wanted to try the song with other musicians. Horn recorded a version with the former Ian Dury backing band the Blockheads, with Norman Watt-Roy on bass. The sessions were deemed to be not modern-sounding enough. Instead, Horn replaced Watt-Roy's with a sampled E note on a bass guitar, which was layered over a Linn 2 bass drum.

Horn constructed a more electronic version with keyboards by the session musician Andy Richards and rhythm programming assistance from J. J. Jeczalik of Art of Noise. Horn developed this version in his west London studio while the band remained in Liverpool. Horn had made three versions of "Relax" prior to Richards and the guitarist Stephen Lipson joining his ZTT Production 'Theam' in late 1983. Horn left the studio late one night asking for Lipson to erase the multitrack (of version 3) due to lack of progress, but came back into the studio some time later to hear Richards playing a variety of modal chords based around the key of E minor with Lipson playing guitar along to the unerased multitrack.

Johnson and the singer Paul Rutherford were the only band members to perform on the final version of "Relax". The only contribution by the other members was a sample crafted from the sound of the rest of the band jumping into a swimming pool. Johnson later said that "Trevor didn't like the band's standard of playing as he couldn't sync it to his machinery". Horn recalled of the song's intro, "Hit singles are not just good songs. They need to be moments. Holly had been blowing his saxophone on the studio roof in Notting Hill at 2am, and a bunch of guys appeared on the street, calling up to him. He came down to do the vocal, and I suggested he play it at the start of 'Relax'." Horn completed the recording having spent £70,000 in studio time.

== Release and controversy ==
ZTT co-founder Paul Morley mapped out the marketing campaign fashioned as a "strategic assault on pop". Morley opted to tackle the biggest possible themes in the band's singles ("sex, war, religion"), of which "Relax" would be the first, and emphasised the shock impact of Johnson and Rutherford's open homosexuality in the packaging and music videos.

Morley intentionally courted scandal with the promotion of "Relax". ZTT initiated the ad campaign for "Relax" with two quarter-page ads in the British music press. The first ad featured images of Rutherford in a sailor cap and a leather vest, and Johnson with a shaved head and rubber gloves. The images were accompanied by the phrase "ALL THE NICE BOYS LOVE SEA MEN", a pun on the music hall song "Ship Ahoy! (All the Nice Girls Love a Sailor)". It declared "Frankie Goes to Hollywood are coming ... making Duran Duran lick the shit off their shoes ... Nineteen inches that must be taken always." The second ad promised "theories of bliss, a history of Liverpool from 1963 to 1983, a guide to Amsterdam bars".

When the single was released in November 1983, the initial progress of "Relax" on the UK Top 75 was sluggish. First charting at no. 67, it had progressed only to no. 35 by its seventh week on the chart, even having fallen back slightly during that time. But then on Thursday 5 January 1984, Frankie Goes to Hollywood were shown performing "Relax" on the BBC flagship television chart show, Top of the Pops. The following week it soared to no. 6. On 11 January 1984, Radio 1 disc jockey Mike Read expressed on air his distaste for both the record's suggestive sleeve (designed by Anne Yvonne Gilbert) and its lyric, which centred on the oft-repeated "Relax, don't do it/ When you want to suck, chew it/ Relax, don't do it/ When you want to come."

In support of their disc jockey, BBC Radio banned the single from its shows a reported two days later (although certain prominent night-time BBC shows – including those of Kid Jensen and John Peel – continued to play the record, as they saw fit, during 1984). The now-banned "Relax" rose to no. 2 on the charts by 17 January, and hit the number-one spot on 24 January. By this time, the BBC Radio ban had extended to Top of the Pops as well, which simply displayed a still picture of the group during its climactic number one announcement, before airing a performance by a non-number one artist.

This went on for the five weeks that "Relax" was at number one. It then began a slow decline on the charts, falling back as far as no. 31 in May 1984 before returning to no. 2 in July whilst Frankie's follow-up single "Two Tribes" held the UK number-one spot. In the end, "Relax" remained in the Top 75 for 48 consecutive weeks and returned in February 1985 for four more, giving a total of 52. The ban became an embarrassment for the BBC, especially given that UK commercial radio and television stations were still playing the song. Later in 1984 the ban was lifted and "Relax" featured on the Christmas Day edition of Top of the Pops.

Throughout the "Relax" controversy, the band continued to publicly deny that the song's lyrics were sexual. Nevertheless, by late 1984, it was clear that the public were aware of the sexual nature of the lyrics, but the scandal had fuelled sales anyway. In 1985, with the release of the Welcome to the Pleasuredome album (which included "Relax"), the band dropped any public pretence about the lyrics:

Everything I say is complete lies. Like, when people ask you what 'Relax' was about, when it first came out we used to pretend it was about motivation, and really it was about shagging.

— Mark O'Toole, Welcome to the Pleasuredome album liner notes

In September 1993, "Relax" was the first of a string of Frankie Goes to Hollywood singles to be reissued that year. It debuted at no. 6 on the UK singles chart and peaked at no. 5 the following week. It spent seven weeks in the top 75, extending its combined total to 59, making it at the time the third longest runner of all time; it has since been surpassed by 44 other songs and sits in joint 47th place.

== Music videos ==
The first official music video for "Relax", directed by Bernard Rose and set in an S&M themed gay nightclub at Wilton's Music Hall in London is featuring the band members accosted by buff leathermen, a glamorous drag queen, and an obese admirer dressed up as a Roman emperor, played by actor John Dair, was allegedly banned by MTV and the BBC, prompting the recording of a second video, directed by Godley and Creme in early 1984, featuring the group performing with the help of laser beams. However, after the second video was made the song was banned completely by the BBC, meaning that neither video was ever broadcast on any BBC music programmes.

A live performance video of the song was directed by David Mallet, making the rounds at MTV. The live version was released as the B-side of the US 12" version of "Welcome to the Pleasuredome", titled "Relax (International)".

Another MTV video of the studio version includes footage from the Brian De Palma film Body Double. A popular 1984 erotic thriller film, Body Double contains a film within a film sequence in which Frankie Goes to Hollywood performs "Relax" on the set of a porn film.

== Critical reception ==
American magazine Cash Box said that the song is "a very danceable cut", in which "heavy bass and bass drum provide the backdrop for Frankie's pleading lyric and Frank Sinatraesque soaring vocal." Alan Jones from Music Week gave the 1993 remix a score of four out of five, writing, "ZTT recently got its catalogue back from Island, and is about to embark on a high profile re-issue/remix campaign, of which this is the first fruit. "Relax" is updated by Ollie J in a stomping house mix, while Jam & Spoon's pumped-up Hi-NRG version is hardcore tempo. With the original mixes added to the package, this is going to be big all over again. But will One FM play it?" Sound on Sound described it as a "hi-NRG brand of dance-synth-pop" that "broke new sonic ground, while epitomising '80s excess in all its garish, overblown glory". Richard Harris from NME wrote: "'Relax' sounds as divine as ever; a perfect soundtrack for pubescents to discover the delightful realities of having hormones." In 2022, Rolling Stone named it the 123rd greatest dance song. In 2025, Billboard ranked it the 35th-greatest "LGBTQ+ anthem".

== Personnel ==
Credits sourced from Sound on Sound.

Frankie Goes to Hollywood

- Holly Johnson – lead vocals
- Paul Rutherford – backing vocals

Other musicians

- Trevor Horn – LinnDrum and Fairlight CMI programming; producer
- J.J. Jeczalik – Fairlight CMI programming
- Stephen Lipson – electric guitars, Roland GR-300 guitar synthesizer
- Andy Richards – Roland Jupiter-8 synthesiser, Roland MC-4 Microcomposer sequencer

== Original 1983–1984 mixes ==
"Relax" (The Last Seven Inches)

Although the 7-inch version of the single remained unchanged throughout its initial release (a mix generally known as "Relax (Move)"), promotional 7-inch records featuring a substantially different mix of "Relax" (entitled either "The Last Seven Inches" or "Warp Mix" because it is a compilation of other versions) were the subject of a limited 1984 release.

"Relax" (The Last Seven Inches)
An excerpt from "Relax" (The Last Seven Inches).

Three principal 12-inch remixes of "Relax" were eventually created by producer Trevor Horn:

One of the reasons we did all the remixes was that the initial 12-inch version of 'Relax' contained something called 'The Sex Mix', which was 16 minutes long and didn't even contain a song. It was really Holly Johnson just jamming, as well as a bunch of samples of the group jumping in the swimming pool and me sort of making disgusting noises by dropping stuff into buckets of water! We got so many complaints about it — particularly from gay clubs, who found it offensive — that we cut it in half and reduced it down to eight minutes, by taking out some of the slightly more offensive parts [this became "Sex Mix (Edition 2)"]. Then we got another load of complaints, because the single version wasn't on the 12-inch — I didn't see the point in this at the time, but I was eventually put straight about it.

Horn attested that visits to New York's Paradise Garage club led to the creation of the final "Relax (New York Mix)", which ultimately replaced the original "Sex Mix" releases:

It was only when I went to this club and heard the sort of things they were playing that I really understood about 12-inch remixes. Although I myself had already had a couple of big 12-inch hits, I'd never heard them being played on a big sound system, and so I then went back and mixed 'Relax' again and that was the version which sold a couple of million over here [in the UK].

== B-sides ==
The 7-inch featured "One September Monday", an interview between ZTT's Paul Morley, Holly Johnson and Paul Rutherford. During the interview, Holly revealed that the group's name derived from a page of the New Yorker magazine, headlined "Frankie Goes Hollywood" and featuring Frank Sinatra "getting mobbed by teenyboppers". On all of the original 12-inch releases, the B-side featured a cover of "Ferry 'Cross the Mersey".

== Zoolander versions ==
"Relax" is a major plot point in the film Zoolander (2001), where the titular character is conditioned to assassinate a target when he hears the song. Limp Bizkit also recorded their own version for the film, though Powerman 5000's cover was used instead, in both the film and on the soundtrack. "Relax" was also used for the trailer of Zoolander 2 (2016).

== Dandy Warhols version ==
The US band The Dandy Warhols recorded a cover version of "Relax". The band's version was released on their 2004 compilation album Come On Feel The Dandy Warhols.

== Track listings ==
- All discographical information pertains to original UK releases only unless noted
- "Relax" written by Peter Gill/Johnson/Mark O'Toole
- "One September Monday" credited to Gill/Johnson/Morley/Brian Nash/O'Toole/Rutherford
- "Ferry 'Cross the Mersey" written by Gerry Marsden

7": ZTT / ZTAS 1 (United Kingdom)

1. "Relax" – 3:53
2. "One September Monday" – 4:47
- Also released as a 7" picture disc (P ZTAS 1).

12": ZTT / 12 ZTAS 1 (United Kingdom)

1. "Relax" (Sex Mix) – 16:24
2. "Ferry 'Cross the Mersey" – 4:03
3. "Relax" (Bonus, Again) – 4:31
- Later reissued in 1984 in a generic sleeve, with the text "Original Mix" on the label.
- Mastered at 33⅓ RPM, despite claiming to run at 45 RPM on the label. The 1984 reissue runs at 45 RPM.

12": ZTT / 12 ZTAS 1 (United Kingdom)

1. "Relax" (Sex Mix, Edition 2) – 8:20
2. "Ferry 'Cross the Mersey" – 4:03
3. "Relax" (Bonus, Again) – 4:31
- "Edition 2" is an edit of "Sex Mix". Commonly nicknamed the "New York Mix".

12": ZTT / 12 ZTAS 1 (United Kingdom)

1. "Relax" (New York Mix) – 7:23
2. "Ferry 'Cross the Mersey" – 4:03
3. "Relax" (Bonus, Again) – 4:31
- "Relax" (New York Mix) is also known as "Relax" (U.S. Mix)
- Also released as a 12" picture disc (12 PZTAS 1).

12": Island / 0-96975 (United States)

1. "Relax" (New York Mix) – 7:23
2. "Relax" (Come Fighting) – 3:53
3. "Relax" (Bonus, Again) – 4:31
- "New York Mix" labelled as "Long version".
- The mixes on the B-side are not stated on the label.
- Also released on MC in Canada (Island / ISC-69750).

12": ZTT / 062-2000686 (Greece)

1. "Relax" (Greek Disco Mix) – 6:15
2. "Ferry 'Cross the Mersey" – 4:03
3. "Relax" (Bonus, Again) – 4:31
- "Disco Mix" (a.k.a. "The Greek Disco Mix") is a combination of "Relax (7" Mix)" and "Sex Mix (Edition 2)".
- "Disco Mix" (a.k.a. "The Greek Disco Mix") is labelled as "Relax" (Sex Mix) on the original 12", which is incorrect.

MC: ZTT / CTIS 102

- "From Soft to Hard – From Dry to Moist"
1. "Relax" (Greatest Bits) – 16:49
  1. "The Party Trick" (acting dumb) – 0:36
  2. "The Special Act" (adapted from the sex mix) – 7:46
  3. "The US Mix" (come dancing) – 4:38
  4. "The Single" (the act) – 3:55
2. "Later On" (from One September Monday) – 1:36
3. "Ferry Across the Mersey (...and Here I'll Stay)" – 4:06
- The mixes on this cassette single reissued on vinyl for Record Store Day 2022 as side A of 'Altered Reels' – the cassette single of "Two Tribes" was reissued on side B.

== Re-issues ==
The title track has periodically been reissued as a single in a number of remix forms.

=== 1993 re-issues ===
CD: ZTT / FGTH1CD

1. "Relax" (Classic 1993 Version) – 3:55
2. "Relax" (MCMXCIII) – 3:42
3. "Relax" (Ollie J. Remix) – 6:38
4. "Relax" (Jam & Spoon Trip-O-Matic Fairy Tale Remix) – 7:52
5. "Relax" (Jam & Spoon HI N-R-G Remix) – 7:55
6. "Relax" (New York Mix – The Original 12") – 7:22

2x12": ZTT / SAM 1231

1. "Relax" (Ollie J. Remix) – 6:38
2. "Relax" (Trip-Ship Edit) – 6:12
3. "Relax" (Ollie J's Seven Inches) – 3:30
4. "Relax" (Jam & Spoon HI N-R-G Remix) – 7:55
5. "Relax" (Jam & Spoon Trip-O-Matic Fairy Tale Remix) – 7:52
6. "Relax" (MCMXCIII) – 3:42
- UK 12" promo

=== 2001 re-issues ===
CD: Repertoire Records / REP 8027 (Germany)

1. "Relax" (Classic 1993 Version) – 3:56
2. "One September Monday" – 4:50
3. "Ferry 'Cross the Mersey" – 4:06
4. "Relax MCMXCIII" – 3:43
5. "Relax" (original video) – 4:07

CD: Star 69 / STARCD 520 (US)

1. "Relax" (Peter Rauhofer's Doomsday Radio Mix) – 3:45
2. "Relax" (Peter Rauhofer's Doomsday Club Mix) – 9:47
3. "Relax" (Saeed & Palash Addictive Journey) – 11:16
4. "Relax" (Coldcut Remix) – 4:59
5. "Relax" (Peter Rauhofer's Doomsday Dub) – 6:27
6. "Relax" (Original New York 12" Mix) – 7:31
7. "Relax" (Original Radio Mix) – 3:54

=== 2009 re-issues ===
CD: Universal Music TV/All Around The World (UK)

1. "Relax" (Chicane Radio Edit) – 3:55
2. "Relax" (Chicane Remix) – 10:05
3. "Relax" (Den Broeder, Cox, Cantrelle Radio Edit) – 3:46
4. "Relax" (Den Broeder, Cox, Cantrelle Club Mix) – 7:39
5. "Relax" (Den Broeder, Cox, Cantrelle Dub Mix) – 6:39
6. "Relax" (LMC Remix) – 6:18
7. "Relax" (Lockout's Radio Edit) – 3:31
8. "Relax" (Lockout's London Mix) – 6:16
9. "Relax" (Spencer & Hill Radio Edit) – 3:21
10. "Relax" (Spencer & Hill Remix) – 5:40
11. "Relax" (Scott Storch Mix) – 3:45
- Promotional release.
- Tracks 3–5 are credited as “Jody Den Broeder Remix”.

12": Universal Music TV/All Around The World / 12GLOBE1167 (UK)

1. "Relax" (Chicane Remix) – 10:05
2. "Relax" (Lockout's Radio Edit) – 3:30
3. "Relax" (New York Mix) – 7:24
4. "Relax" (Den Broeder, Cox, Cantrelle Radio Edit) – 3:42
- Limited to 900 copies.
- "New York Mix" mislabelled as "US Mix", arguably one of the few ZTT releases to do so.

Digital Download: Universal Music TV/All Around The World (UK)

1. "Relax" (Original 7") – 3:55
2. "Relax" (Chicane Radio Edit) – 3:11
3. "Relax" (Den Broeder, Cox, Cantrelle Radio Edit) – 3:42
4. "Relax" (Lockout's Radio Edit) – 3:30
5. "Relax" (Spencer & Hill Radio Edit) – 3:21

=== 2014 re-issues ===
12": ZTT/Salvo / SALVOTWS01 (UK)

1. "Relax" (Sex Mix Edit) [mislabeled as "Sex Mix Edition 3"] – 8:10
2. "Ferry 'Cross the Mersey" – 4:03
3. "Relax" (Bonus, Again) – 4:31
- "Sex Mix Edit" was mixed by Luis Jardim with Bob Painter as engineer on 13 December 1984, having taken the multitracks with him (according to the booklet of The Art of The 12" Volume 2). It was first released on the 2009 Japanese "Return to the Pleasuredome" box set by accident, due to confusion with "Sex Mix Edition 2".
- "Bonus, Again" mislabelled "The Instrumental", as if it was an unreleased mix.

Digital Download: ZTT (UK)

1. "Relax" (7" Mix) – 3:56
2. "Relax" (Sex Mix) – 16:25
3. "Relax" (New York Mix) – 7:26
4. "Relax" (Greatest Bits) – 16:50
5. "Relax" (Sex Mix Edition 2) – 8:25
6. "Relax" (Sex Mix Edit) [mislabeled as "Sex Mix Edition 3"] – 8:10
7. "Relax" (Greek Disco Mix) – 6:16
8. "Relax" (The Last Seven Inches!) – 3:32
9. "One September Monday" – 4:49
10. "Ferry Cross The Mersey" – 4:08
11. "Relax" (Bonus, Again) – 4:35

== Charts ==
=== Weekly charts ===
Weekly chart performance for "Relax"
Chart (1983–1985)	Peak position
Australia (Kent Music Report)	5
Austria (Ö3 Austria Top 40)	4
Belgium (Ultratop 50 Flanders)	2
Canada Top Singles (RPM)	11
Denmark (Tracklisten)	5
Europe (Eurochart Hot 100 Singles)	1
Finland (The Official Finnish Charts)	1
France (SNEP)	1
Greece (IFPI Greece)	1
Hong Kong (Hong Kong Singles Chart)	9
Iceland (Tónlist)	2
Ireland (IRMA)	3
Italy (Musica e dischi)	1
Netherlands (Dutch Top 40)	5
Netherlands (Single Top 100)	5
New Zealand (Recorded Music NZ)	10
Norway (VG-lista)	2
Poland (ZPAV)	18
Portugal (Portugal Singles Chart)	18
Spain (AFYVE)	1
Sweden (Sverigetopplistan)	4
Switzerland (Schweizer Hitparade)	1
Thailand (Thailand Singles Chart)	1
UK Singles (OCC)	1
US Billboard Hot 100	10
US Dance Club Songs (Billboard)	20
West Germany (GfK)	1

Weekly chart performance for 1993 reissue
Chart (1993–1994)	Peak position
Finland (Suomen virallinen lista)	1
France (SNEP)	23
Ireland (IRMA)	6
Japan (Oricon)	40
Netherlands (Dutch Top 40)	8
New Zealand (Recorded Music NZ)	15
Norway (VG-lista)	7
Sweden (Sverigetopplistan)	15

Weekly chart performance for "Relax '93"
Chart (1993–1994)	Peak position
Australia (ARIA)	22
Austria (Ö3 Austria Top 40)	10
Belgium (Ultratop 50 Flanders)	13
Europe (Eurochart Hot 100)	8
Europe (European Dance Radio)	7
Europe (European Hit Radio)	30
Germany (Media Control Charts)	13
Netherlands (Single Top 100)	12
Switzerland (Schweizer Hitparade)	6
UK Singles (OCC)	5
UK Airplay (Music Week)	15
UK Dance (Music Week)	1
UK Club Chart (Music Week)	16

=== Year-end charts ===
1984 year-end chart performance for "Relax"
Chart (1984)	Position
Australia (Kent Music Report)	16
Austria (Ö3 Austria Top 40)	20
Belgium (Ultratop)	22
Canada Top Singles (RPM)	88
Netherlands (Dutch Top 40)	63
Netherlands (Single Top 100)	33
New Zealand (RIANZ)	16
Switzerland (Schweizer Hitparade)	6
UK Singles (OCC)	3
West Germany (Media Control)	3

1985 year-end chart performance for "Relax"
Chart (1985)	Position
United States (Joel Whitburn's Pop Annual)	102

1993 year-end chart performance for "Relax"
Chart (1993)	Position
Netherlands (Dutch Top 40)	91
Sweden (Topplistan)	44

1993 year-end chart performance for "Relax '93"
Chart (1993)	Position
Belgium (Ultratop)	98
Germany (Media Control)	92
UK Singles (OCC)	76

== Certifications and sales ==
Certifications and sales for "Relax"
Region	Certification	Certified units/sales
Canada (Music Canada)	Gold	50,000^{^}
France (SNEP)	Gold	500,000^{*}
Italy (FIMI)	Gold	50,000^{‡}
New Zealand (RMNZ)	Platinum	30,000^{‡}
Spain (Promusicae)	Gold	30,000^{‡}
United Kingdom (BPI)	Platinum	2,103,000
United States (RIAA)	Gold	500,000^{^}
^{*} Sales figures based on certification alone.^{^} Shipments figures based on certification alone.^{‡} Sales+streaming figures based on certification alone.

== See also ==
- List of songs banned by the BBC

== Bibliography ==
- Reynolds, Simon (2005). Rip It Up and Start Again: Postpunk 1978–1984. Penguin. ISBN 0-14-303672-6.
