= Gerry and the Pacemakers discography =

- Studio albums: 9
- EPs: 8
- Soundtrack albums: 1
- Live albums: 4
- Compilation albums: 15
- Singles: 26
- Video albums: 1

This is the discography of British beat group Gerry and the Pacemakers.

== Albums ==
=== Studio albums ===
Title	Album details	Peak chart positions		
Title	Album details	UK	CAN	US
How Do You Like It? (Note: Released in Canada as I'm the One with a slightly different track listing in May 1964.)	Released: October 1963; Label: Columbia; Formats: LP, reel-to-reel	2	3	—
Don't Let the Sun Catch You Crying	Released: June 1964; Label: Laurie; Formats: LP; US-only release	—	—	29
Gerry and the Pacemakers' Second Album	Released: November 1964; Label: Laurie; Formats: LP; US-only release	—	—	129
Gerry's Second Album	Released: 11 January 1965; Label: Capitol; Formats: LP; Canada-only release	—	5	—
I'll Be There!	Released: February 1965; Label: Laurie; Formats: LP	—	—	120
Girl on a Swing	Released: December 1966; Label: Laurie; Formats: LP; US-only release	—	—	—
Gerry and the Pacemakers... Today!	Released: 2 January 1967; Label: Capitol; Formats: LP; Canada-only release	—	—	—
A Portrait of Gerry and the Pacemakers	Released: 1981; Label: Pacer; Formats: LP; Contains re-recordings and new material	—	—	—
20 Year Anniversary Album	Released: February 1983; Label: DEB; Formats: LP, MC; Contains re-recordings	—	—	—
"—" denotes releases that did not chart or were not released in that territory.

=== Soundtrack albums ===
Title	Album details	Peak chart positions		
Title	Album details	UK	CAN	US
Ferry Cross the Mersey	Released: January 1965; Label: Columbia, United Artists; Formats: LP; Includes other artists	19	4	13

=== Live albums ===
Title	Album details
Ferry Cross the Mersey	Released: 1981; Label: Accord; Formats: LP, MC
Live	Released: 1989; Label: Pacer; Formats: LP
Gerry & the Pacemakers Live	Released: 2010; Label: Self-released; Formats: CD
Live at the BBC	Released: 26 October 2018; Label: Parlophone; Formats: CD, digital download

=== Compilation albums ===
Title	Album details	Peak chart positions	
Title	Album details	US	UK
Gerry and the Pacemakers' Greatest Hits	Released: April 1965; Label: Laurie, Columbia; Formats: LP, 4-track; US and Australia-only release	44	—
The Hits of Gerry and the Pacemakers	Released: 3 January 1966; Label: Capitol; Formats: LP	—	—
The Best of Gerry and the Pacemakers	Released: October 1977; Label: EMI; Formats: LP, MC	—	—
The Very Best of Gerry and the Pacemakers	Released: May 1984; Label: Music for Pleasure; Formats: LP, MC	—	— (Note: "The Very Best of Gerry and the Pacemakers" did not chart on the main UK albums chart; in 2021, after Gerry Marsden's death, it debuted and peaked on the UK Album Downloads Chart at number 27.)
Survivor	Released: 1985; Label: Pacer; Formats: LP	—	—
The EP Collection	Released: April 1987; Label: See for Miles; Formats: LP, MC	—	—
The Hit Singles Album	Released: January 1987; Label: EMI; Formats: CD, LP	—	—
The Collection	Released: June 1990; Label: Castle Communications; Formats: CD, 2xLP	—	—
The Best of Gerry & the Pacemakers – The Definitive Collection	Released: 15 October 1991; Label: United Artists/EMI; Formats: CD, MC; US-only release	—	—
The Best of the EMI Years	Released: 18 May 1992; Label: EMI; Formats: CD, MC	—	—
The Very Best of Gerry and the Pacemakers	Released: 1993; Label: Music for Pleasure; Formats: CD	—	—
Gerry and the Pacemakers at Abbey Road 1963 to 1966	Released: 13 October 1997; Label: EMI; Formats: CD	—	—
The Essential Gerry and the Pacemakers	Released: 24 March 2003; Label: EMI; Formats: CD	—	—
A's B's & EPs	Released: 1 March 2004; Label: EMI; Formats: CD	—	—
You'll Never Walk Alone – The EMI Years 1963–1966	Released: 11 February 2008; Label: EMI; Formats: 4xCD	—	—
"—" denotes releases that did not chart or were not released in that territory.

=== Video albums ===
Title	Album details	Peak chart positions
Title	Album details	UK Official Music Video Chart
It's Gonna Be All Right 1963–1965	Released: September 2009; Label: Delta Entertainment; Formats: DVD	40

== EPs ==
Title (Note: This is a list of EPs released in the UK. Various other EPs were released elsewhere.)	Album details	Peak chart positions
Title	Album details	UK
How Do You Do It?	Released: July 1963; Label: Columbia; Formats: 7"	2
You'll Never Walk Alone	Released: 7 February 1964; Label: Columbia; Formats: 7"	8
I'm the One	Released: March 1964; Label: Columbia; Formats: 7"	11
Don't Let the Sun Catch You Crying	Released: September 1964; Label: Columbia; Formats: 7"	15
It's Gonna Be All Right	Released: December 1964; Label: Columbia; Formats: 7"	—
Gerry in California	Released: February 1965; Label: Columbia; Formats: 7"	—
Hits from "Ferry Cross the Mersey"	Released: March 1965; Label: Columbia; Formats: 7"	—
Rip It Up	Released: 4 June 1965; Label: Columbia; Formats: 7"	—
"—" denotes releases that did not chart.

== Singles ==
In the United States, a different series of Gerry and the Pacemakers' singles was issued, as their Laurie Records label created more albums, and at least two singles, which were never issued in Britain. This was a standard practice at the time; it also happened with the Beatles and the Dave Clark Five.

Title (A-side, B-side)	Year	Peak chart positions									UK Album	US Album
Title (A-side, B-side)	Year	UK	AUS	CAN	IRE	NL	NOR	NZ	SWE	US	UK Album	US Album
"How Do You Do It?" b/w "Away from You"	1963	1	3	—	4	—	7	3	1	—	Non-album singles	Don't Let the Sun Catch You Crying
"I Like It" b/w "It's Happened to Me"	1963	1	6	—	1	3	6	1	5	—	Non-album singles	Gerry and the Pacemakers' Second Album
"You'll Never Walk Alone" b/w "It's All Right"	1963	1	1	—	1	—	—	1	10	—	A: How Do You Like It? B: Non-album track	A: Don't Let the Sun Catch You Crying; B: Non-album track
"I'm the One" b/w "You've Got What I Like"	1964	2	14	1	3	—	—	5	15	82	Non-album singles	A: Don't Let the Sun Catch You Crying; UK B: Unreleased in US; US B: Second Album
"Don't Let the Sun Catch You Crying" b/w "Show Me That You Care" (UK); "Away from You" (US)	1964	6	21	4	—	—	—	6	—	4	Non-album singles	Don't Let the Sun Catch You Crying
"Jambalaya" (Scandinavia and Canada-only release) b/w "Shot of Rhythm and Blues" (Scandinavia); "Summertime" (Canada)	1964	—	—	— (Note: "Jambalaya" did not enter the RPM Top 40, but did peak at number 8 on the CHUM Hit Parade.)	—	—	—	—	18	—	How Do You Like It?	A & CAN B: Don't Let the Sun Catch You Crying; SCAN B: Gerry and the Pacemakers' Second Album
"How Do You Do It?" (US and Canada-only re-release) b/w "You'll Never Walk Alone" (US); "Away from You" (Canada)	1964	—	—	6	—	—	—	—	—	9	A: Non-album track US B: How Do You Like It? CAN B: Non-album track	Don't Let the Sun Catch You Crying
"It's Gonna Be All Right" b/w "It's Just Because" (UK); "Skinny Minnie" (US)	1964	24	36	11	—	—	—	—	—	23	A: Ferry Cross the Mersey; UK & US B: Non-album tracks	A: Ferry Cross the Mersey; UK: Non-album track US B: I'll Be There
"I Like It" (US and Canada-only re-release) b/w "Jambalaya" (US); "It's Happened to Me" (Canada)	1964	—	—	11	—	—	—	—	—	17	A: Non-album track US B: How Do You Like It? CAN B: Non-album track	Gerry and the Pacemakers' Second Album
"I'll Be There" b/w "Baby You're So Good to Me" (UK); "You You You" (US)	1964	15	9	1	—	—	—	—	—	14	A & US B: Non-album tracks UK B: Ferry Cross the Mersey	A & US B: I'll Be There; UK B: Ferry Cross the Mersey
"Ferry Cross the Mersey" b/w "You You You" (UK); "Pretend" (US)	1964	8	2	4	—	—	—	—	12	6	A: Ferry Cross the Mersey; UK B: Non-album track US B: How Do You Like It?	A: Ferry Cross the Mersey; UK B: I'll Be There; US B: Gerry and the Pacemakers' Second Album
"Pretend" (Australia and Germany-only release) b/w "Here's Hoping" (Australia); "Why Oh Why" (Germany)	1965	—	17	—	—	—	—	—	—	—	A & AUS B: How Do You Like It? GER B: Ferry Cross the Mersey	A & AUS B: Gerry and the Pacemakers' Second Album; GER B: Ferry Cross the Mersey
"You'll Never Walk Alone" (US and Canada-only re-release) b/w "Away from You" (US); "It's All Right" (Canada)	1965	—	—	31	—	—	—	—	—	48	A: How Do You Like It? US & CAN B: Non-album tracks	A & US B: Don't Let the Sun Catch You Crying; CAN B: Non-album track
"Give All Your Love to Me" (US, Canada and Australia-only release) b/w "You're the Reason" (US and Canada); "The Wrong Yo Yo" (Australia)	1965	—	45	17	—	—	—	—	—	68; 117	A: Non-album track US/CAN & AUS B: How Do You Like It?	A: Non-album track US/CAN: Don't Let the Sun Catch You Crying; AUS B: Gerry and the Pacemakers' Second Album
"Walk Hand in Hand" b/w "Dreams"	1965	29	32	10	—	—	—	13	—	103	Non-album singles	Non-album single
"La La La" b/w "Without You"	1966	—	66	4	—	—	—	—	—	90	Non-album singles	Girl on a Swing
"Girl on a Swing" b/w "Fool to Myself" (UK); "The Way You Look Tonight" (US)	1966	53 (Note: Chart position is from the official UK "Breakers List".)	24	3	—	—	—	3	—	28	Non-album singles	A & US B: Girl on a Swing; UK B: Unreleased in US
"The Big Bright Green Pleasure Machine" (US, Canada and Australia-only release) b/w "Looking For My Life"	1966	—	—	—	—	—	—	—	—	—	Non-album singles	Girl on a Swing
"Don't Let the Sun Catch You Crying" (US-only re-release) b/w "Away from You"	1970	—	—	—	—	—	—	—	—	112	Non-album singles	Don't Let the Sun Catch You Crying
"Remember (The Days of Rock and Roll)" b/w "There's Still Time"	1974	—	—	—	—	—	—	—	—	—	Non-album singles	Non-album singles
"You'll Never Walk Alone" (re-recording) b/w "Here I Go Again"	1977	—	—	—	—	—	—	—	—	—	Non-album singles	Non-album singles
"Unchained Melody" b/w "Girl What You Doin'"	1982	—	—	—	—	—	—	—	—	—	Non-album singles	Non-album singles
"Oh My Love" b/w "If"	1983	—	—	—	—	—	—	—	—	—	20 Year Anniversary Album	Non-album singles
"The Rose" b/w "You Are My Everything"	1984	—	—	—	—	—	—	—	—	—	Non-album singles	Non-album singles
"You'll Never Walk Alone" (Netherlands-only re-release) b/w "We Got the Whole World in Our Hands" (by Nothing Forest with Paper Lace)	1995	—	—	—	—	34	—	—	—	—	Non-album singles	Non-album singles
"You'll Never Walk Alone" (re-entry)	2007	— (Note: "You'll Never Walk Alone" did not re-enter the main UK singles chart but instead peaked at number 11 on the UK Official Singles Downloads Chart in 2007.)	—	—	—	—	—	—	—	—	Non-album singles	Non-album singles
"You'll Never Walk Alone" (re-entry)	2012	12	—	—	4	—	—	—	—	—	Non-album singles	Non-album singles
"You'll Never Walk Alone" (re-entry)	2019	— (Note: "You'll Never Walk Alone" did not re-enter the main UK singles chart but instead peaked at number 19 on the UK Official Singles Sales Chart in 2019.)	—	—	—	—	—	—	—	—	Non-album singles	Non-album singles
"Ferry Cross the Mercy" (re-entry)	2021	— (Note: After Gerry Marsden's death in 2021, "Ferry Cross the Mersey" did not re-enter the main UK singles chart but instead peaked at number 64 on the UK Official Singles Sales Chart and at number 63 on the UK Official Singles Downloads Chart.)	—	—	—	—	—	—	—	—	Non-album singles	Non-album singles
"—" denotes releases that did not chart or were not released in that territory.
