= A Different Hat =

Studio album by Paul Carrack with The Royal Philharmonic Orchestra
- Released: 2010
- Studios: AIR Studios (London, UK)
- Genres: Pop rock; soft rock; adult contemporary
- Length: 47:22
- Label: Carrack-UK
- Producers: Peter Van Hooke; Paul Carrack

Paul Carrack with The Royal Philharmonic Orchestra chronology
I Know That Name (2008)	A Different Hat (2010)	Good Feeling (2012)

A Different Hat is the thirteenth solo studio album by the English singer-songwriter Paul Carrack. Recorded with The Royal Philharmonic Orchestra, it is a collection mostly of cover songs, ranging from the Frank Sinatra standard "All the Way" to the Bonnie Raitt ballad "I Can't Make You Love Me". Carrack also tackled four of his own songs which he had previously recorded, heard here in new arrangements: "I Live On a Battlefield" (previously recorded as "Battlefield" on 1989's Groove Approved), "Eyes of Blue", "Love Will Keep Us Alive" and "It Ain't Over".

A Different Hat was originally released in 2010 on Carrack's own Carrack-UK label.

== Track listing ==
No.	Title	Writer(s)	Length
1.	"I Think It's Going to Rain Today"	Randy Newman	4:30
2.	"Moon River"	Henry Mancini, Johnny Mercer	3:28
3.	"Don't Let the Sun Catch You Crying"	Gerry Marsden, Freddie Marsden, Les Chadwick, Les Maguire	3:53
4.	"I Can't Make You Love Me"	Mike Reid, Allen Shamblin	4:16
5.	"I Live On a Battlefield"	Paul Carrack, Nick Lowe	4:06
6.	"Eyes of Blue"	Carrack	4:17
7.	"I Don't Know Enough About You"	Peggy Lee, Dave Barbour	3:18
8.	"All the Way"	Sammy Cahn, Jimmy Van Heusen	4:27
9.	"If You Love Me"	Marguerite Monnot, Geoffrey Parsons	3:34
10.	"Love Will Keep Us Alive"	Carrack, Jim Capaldi, Peter Vale	4:03
11.	"For All We Know"	J. Fred Coots, Sam Lewis	3:12
12.	"It Ain't Over"	Carrack	4:20

== Charts ==
Chart (2011)	Peak position
UK Independent Albums (Official Charts)	6

== Personnel ==
Musicians

- Paul Carrack – vocals, grand piano
- The Royal Philharmonic Orchestra – orchestra
- David Cullen – orchestral arrangements and conductor
- Gill Townend – music preparation
- Davy Spillane – low whistle

Production

- Peter Van Hooke – producer
- Paul Carrack – producer
- Geoff Foster – engineer
- Simon Rhodes – engineer
- Graham Bonnett – additional engineer
- Rupert Cobb – additional engineer, Pro Tools
- Mick Glossop – mixing
- Ian Ross – design
- Andrea Hunnisett – photography
