= List of members of bands featuring members of the Beatles =

The Beatles began in 1956, when John Lennon formed a skiffle group with his friends called the Quarrymen. The band underwent many name and membership changes, culminating in 1962 with the famous line-up of Lennon, Paul McCartney, George Harrison, and Ringo Starr.

After the Beatles disbanded in 1970, each of the four members went on to have success, both as solo acts and with their own groups. Although Lennon died in 1980, the remaining Beatles re-united in 1994 to record new songs, "Free as a Bird" and "Real Love", for the Anthology project. Harrison died in 2001; McCartney and Starr re-united again as the Beatles in 2022 to complete the unfinished Anthology project "Now and Then", which was released the following year. These three songs were written and originally recorded on a cassette tape by Lennon.

== Pre-Beatles ==
=== John Lennon, Paul McCartney, George Harrison ===
The Blackjacks (November 1956)	John Lennon – vocals, lead guitar; Eric Griffiths – rhythm guitar; Pete Shotton – washboard; Bill Smith – tea chest bass
The Quarrymen (November–December 1956)	John Lennon – vocals, lead guitar; Nigel Walley – tea chest bass; Eric Griffiths – rhythm guitar; Colin Hanton – drums; Pete Shotton – washboard
The Quarrymen (December 1956 – Early 1957)	John Lennon – vocals, lead guitar; Ivan Vaughan – tea chest bass; Eric Griffiths – rhythm guitar; Colin Hanton – drums; Pete Shotton – washboard
The Quarrymen (Early 1957 – 7 August)	John Lennon – vocals, lead guitar; Len Garry – tea chest bass; Rod Davis – banjo; Eric Griffiths – rhythm guitar; Colin Hanton – drums; Pete Shotton – washboard
The Rebels (Spring 1957)	George Harrison – vocals, rhythm guitar; Arthur Kelly – guitar; Peter Harrison – lead guitar; Alan Williams – tea chest bass
The Quarrymen (August 1957)	John Lennon – vocals, lead guitar; Len Garry – tea chest bass; Eric Griffiths – rhythm guitar; Colin Hanton – drums; Pete Shotton – Washboard
The Quarrymen (August – 18 October 1957)	John Lennon – vocals, lead guitar; Len Garry – tea chest bass; Eric Griffiths – rhythm guitar; Colin Hanton – drums
The McCartney Brothers (August 1957)	Paul McCartney – vocals, guitar; Mike McCartney – vocals
The Quarrymen (18 October 1957 – February 1958)	John Lennon – vocals, rhythm guitar; Paul McCartney – lead guitar, vocals; Len Garry – tea chest bass; Eric Griffiths – rhythm guitar; Colin Hanton – drums
The Quarrymen (February 1958)	John Lennon – vocals, rhythm guitar; Paul McCartney – vocals, rhythm guitar; George Harrison – lead guitar; Len Garry – tea chest bass; Eric Griffiths – rhythm guitar; Colin Hanton – drums
The Quarrymen (February–March 1958)	John Lennon – vocals, rhythm guitar; Paul McCartney – vocals, rhythm guitar; George Harrison – lead guitar; John Lowe – piano; Len Garry – tea chest bass; Eric Griffiths – rhythm guitar; Colin Hanton – drums
The Quarrymen (March – July 1958)	John Lennon – vocals, rhythm guitar; Paul McCartney – vocals, rhythm guitar; George Harrison – lead guitar; John Duff Lowe – piano; Colin Hanton – drums
The Quarrymen (July – November 1958)	John Lennon – vocals, rhythm guitar; Paul McCartney – vocals, rhythm guitar; George Harrison – lead guitar, vocals
The Vikings (Summer 1958)	John Bierly – vocals, guitar; Glyn Williams – guitar, vocals; Bernard Lee – guitar; Aneurin Thomas – tea-chest bass; John Dingle – drums; Paul McCartney – guitar; George Harrison – guitar
Johnny and the Moondogs (November – 19 December 1958)	John Lennon – vocals; Paul McCartney – rhythm guitar; George Harrison – lead guitar
Japage 3 (19 December 1958 – May 1959)	John Lennon – vocals, rhythm guitar; Paul McCartney – vocals, rhythm guitar; George Harrison – lead guitar, vocals
The Les Stewart Quartet (22 February – 22 August 1959)	Les Stewart – vocals, lead guitar; Ken Brown – rhythm guitar; George Harrison – rhythm guitar; Geoff Skinner – drums
The Quarrymen (22 August 1959 – 9 January 1960)	John Lennon – vocals, rhythm guitar; Paul McCartney – vocals, rhythm guitar; George Harrison – lead guitar, vocals; Ken Brown – rhythm guitar
The Rainbows (29 August 1959)	John Lennon – vocals, rhythm guitar; Paul McCartney – vocals, rhythm guitar; George Harrison – lead guitar, vocals
The Quarrymen (9–21 January 1960)	John Lennon – vocals, rhythm guitar; Paul McCartney – vocals, rhythm guitar; George Harrison – lead guitar, vocals
The Quarrymen (21 January – Early Winter (January - March) 1960)	John Lennon – vocals, rhythm guitar; Paul McCartney – vocals, rhythm guitar; George Harrison – lead guitar, vocals; Stuart Sutcliffe – bass
Los Paranoias (Early Winter 1960)	John Lennon – vocals, rhythm guitar; Paul McCartney – vocals, rhythm guitar; George Harrison – lead guitar, vocals; Stuart Sutcliffe – bass

=== Pete Best ===
The Blackjacks (20 December 1959 – March 1960)	Chas Newby – vocals, guitar; Ken Brown – guitar; Bill Barlow – guitar; Pete Best – drums

=== Ringo Starr ===
The Eddie Clayton Skiffle Group (1957 – Spring 1959)	Eddie Clayton (Eddie Myles) – vocals, lead guitar; Peter Healey – rhythm guitar; Roy Trafford – tea chest bass, vocals; John Dougherty/Micky McGrellis – washboard, vocals; Ringo Starr – drums
Richy Starkey's unnamed group (Spring 1959)	Richy Starkey – drums; Roy Trafford – guitar; Jimmy Roughley – clarinet; Johnny Mooney – trumpet; unknown – tea chest bass
Darktown (Spring–Summer 1959)	Gladys Jill Martin – vocals; Richy Starkey – drums; other members unknown
The Raving Texans (May – 11 November 1959)	Alan Caldwell – vocals; John Byrne – lead guitar; Charles O'Brien – rhythm guitar; Walter Eymond – bass, vocals; Richy Starkey – drums
Rory Storm and the Hurricanes (11 November 1959 – December 1961)	"Rory Storm" (Alan Caldwell) – vocals; "Johnny Guitar" (John Byrne) – lead guitar; "Ty Brien" (Charles O'Brien) – rhythm guitar; "Lu Walters" (Walter Eymond) – bass, vocals; "Ringo Starr" (Richy Starkey) – drums, vocals
Lu Walters (15 October 1960)	Lu Walters – vocals, bass; John Lennon – rhythm guitar; Paul McCartney – rhythm guitar; George Harrison – lead guitar; Ringo Starr – drums
Top Ten Club house band (December 1961 – March 1962)	Tony Sheridan – vocals, guitar; Roy Young – piano; Colin Crawley – bass; Ringo Starr – drums
Rory Storm and the Hurricanes (March – 18 August 1962)	Rory Storm – vocals; Johnny Guitar – lead guitar; Ty Brien – rhythm guitar; Bobby Thompson – bass; Ringo Starr – drums

== The Beatles ==
The Beatals (27 March – 10 May 1960)	John Lennon – vocals, rhythm guitar; Paul McCartney – vocals, rhythm guitar; George Harrison – lead guitar, vocals; Stuart Sutcliffe – bass
The Nerk Twins (23–24 April 1960)	John Lennon – vocals, guitar; Paul McCartney – vocals, guitar
Long John and the Silver Beetles (10–12 May 1960)	John Lennon – vocals, rhythm guitar; Paul McCartney – vocals, rhythm guitar; George Harrison – lead guitar, vocals; Stuart Sutcliffe – bass; Tommy Moore – drums
The Silver Beetles (13–20 May 1960)	John Lennon – vocals, rhythm guitar; Paul McCartney – vocals, rhythm guitar; George Harrison – lead guitar, vocals; Stuart Sutcliffe – bass; Tommy Moore – drums
Johnny Gentle and his group (20–28 May 1960)	"Johnny Gentle" (John Askew) – vocals; "Johnny Lennon" (John Lennon) – rhythm guitar; "Paul Ramon" (Paul McCartney) – rhythm guitar; "Carl Harrison" (George Harrison) – lead guitar; "Stuart de Staël" (Stuart Sutcliffe) – bass; "Thomas Moore" (Tommy Moore) – drums
The Silver Beetles (31 May – 11 June 1960)	John Lennon – vocals, rhythm guitar; Paul McCartney – vocals, rhythm guitar; George Harrison – lead guitar, vocals; Stuart Sutcliffe – bass; Tommy Moore – drums
The Silver Beetles (June 1960)	John Lennon – vocals, rhythm guitar; Paul McCartney – vocals, rhythm guitar; George Harrison – lead guitar, vocals; Stuart Sutcliffe – bass; Various guest drummers (incl. Ronnie “The Ted”)
The Silver Beatles (June 1960)	John Lennon – vocals, rhythm guitar; Paul McCartney – vocals, rhythm guitar; George Harrison – lead guitar, vocals; Stuart Sutcliffe – bass; Norman Chapman – drums
The Silver Beatles (July – 12 August 1960)	John Lennon – vocals, rhythm guitar; Paul McCartney – drums; George Harrison – lead guitar, vocals; Stuart Sutcliffe – bass
The Silver Beatles (12–17 August 1960)	John Lennon – vocals, rhythm guitar; Paul McCartney – vocals, rhythm guitar; George Harrison – lead guitar, vocals; Stuart Sutcliffe – bass, vocals; Pete Best – drums
The Beatles (17 August – 30 November 1960) Official name change to the Beatles.	John Lennon – vocals, rhythm guitar; Paul McCartney – vocals, rhythm guitar; George Harrison – lead guitar, vocals; Stuart Sutcliffe – bass, vocals; Pete Best – drums
Lu Walters (15 October 1960)	Lu Walters – vocals, bass; John Lennon – rhythm guitar; Paul McCartney – rhythm guitar; George Harrison – lead guitar; Ringo Starr – drums
The Beatles (November – November 21, 1960)	John Lennon – vocals, rhythm guitar, harmonica; Paul McCartney – vocals, rhythm guitar, piano, drums; George Harrison – vocals, lead guitar; Stuart Sutcliffe – bass, vocals; Pete Best – drums, vocals; Occasional guests: Tony Sheridan – vocals, guitar (although not an official member, Sheridan played with the Beatles almost every night at many clubs); Fred Fascher – vocals; Horst Fascher – vocals; Ringo Starr – drums, percussion (occasional substitute)
The Beatles (21 November 1960) Harrison gets deported.	John Lennon – vocals, rhythm guitar; Paul McCartney – vocals, lead guitar; Stuart Sutcliffe – bass, vocals; Pete Best – drums
The Beatles (1 December 1960) McCartney and Best get deported.	John Lennon – vocals, rhythm guitar; Stuart Sutcliffe – bass, vocals
The Beatles (1–16 December 1960)	John Lennon – vocals, rhythm guitar; Paul McCartney – vocals, rhythm guitar; George Harrison – vocals, lead guitar; Pete Best – drums
The Beatles (17 December 1960 – January 1961)	John Lennon – vocals, rhythm guitar; Paul McCartney – vocals, rhythm guitar; George Harrison – lead guitar, vocals; Pete Best – drums; Chas Newby – bass
The Beatles (January 1961)	John Lennon – vocals, rhythm guitar; Paul McCartney – vocals, rhythm guitar; George Harrison – lead guitar, vocals; Pete Best – drums
The Beatles (15 January – 1 April 1961)	John Lennon – vocals, rhythm guitar; Paul McCartney – vocals, rhythm guitar; George Harrison – lead guitar, vocals; Stuart Sutcliffe – bass, vocals; Pete Best – drums
The Beatles (1 April – 1 July 1961)	John Lennon – vocals, rhythm guitar; Paul McCartney – piano, vocals; George Harrison – lead guitar, vocals; Stuart Sutcliffe – bass, vocals; Pete Best – drums; Tony Sheridan – vocals, guitar (although not an official member, Sheridan played with the Beatles almost every night at the Top Ten Club)
Tony Sheridan and the Beat Brothers (June 1961)	Tony Sheridan – vocals, lead guitar; John Lennon – rhythm guitar, vocals; Paul McCartney – bass, vocals; George Harrison – lead guitar; Pete Best – drums
The Beatles (2 July 1961 – 20 August 1961)	John Lennon – vocals, rhythm guitar, harmonica; Paul McCartney – vocals, bass; George Harrison – vocals, lead guitar; Pete Best – drums, vocals
The Savage Young Beatles (20 August 1961 – 19 October 1961)	John Lennon – piano; Paul McCartney – rhythm guitar; George Harrison – lead guitar; Pete Best – drums
The Beatmakers (19 October 1961)	John Lennon – piano; Paul McCartney – rhythm guitar; George Harrison – lead guitar; Pete Best – drums; Gerry Marsden – vocals, lead guitar; Fred Marsden – drums; Les Chadwick – bass; Les Maguire – saxophone
The Beatles (20 October 1961 – 18 August 1962)	John Lennon – vocals, rhythm guitar, harmonica; Paul McCartney – vocals, bass, rhythm guitar, keyboards, drums; George Harrison – lead guitar, vocals; Pete Best – drums, vocals, percussion
The Beatles (18 August 1962 – 2 June 1964)	John Lennon – vocals, rhythm guitar, harmonica, keyboards, lead guitar, percussion; Paul McCartney – vocals, bass, keyboards, rhythm guitar, percussion; George Harrison – lead guitar, vocals, percussion; Ringo Starr – drums, percussion, vocals
The Beatles (3–13 June 1964) Starr is ill	John Lennon – vocals, rhythm guitar; Paul McCartney – vocals, bass; George Harrison – lead guitar, vocals; Ringo Starr (not touring) – drums, vocals; Touring member: Jimmie Nicol – drums
The Beatles (14 June 1964 – 22 August 1968)	John Lennon – vocals, guitars, harmonica, keyboards, percussion; Paul McCartney – vocals, bass, guitars, keyboards, drums, percussion; George Harrison – guitars, vocals, percussion, sitar, tambura, keyboards; Ringo Starr – drums, vocals, percussion, keyboards
The Beatles (22 August 1968 – 5 September 1968) Starr briefly quits	John Lennon – vocals, guitars, keyboards, bass, percussion, drums; Paul McCartney – vocals, bass, drums, percussion, keyboards, guitars; George Harrison – vocals, guitars, vocals, bass, percussion, drums
The Beatles (6 September 1968 – 10 January 1969)	John Lennon – vocals, guitars, keyboards, bass, percussion; Paul McCartney – vocals, bass, guitars, keyboards, percussion; George Harrison – vocals, guitars, bass, keyboards, percussion; Ringo Starr – drums, percussion, vocals
The Beatles (10 January 1969 – 15 January 1969) Harrison briefly quits	John Lennon – vocals, guitars, keyboards, bass, percussion; Paul McCartney – vocals, bass, guitars, keyboards, percussion; Ringo Starr – drums, percussion, vocals
The Beatles with Billy Preston 15 January – 2 May 1969 Get Back and early Abbey Road sessions	John Lennon – vocals, guitars, keyboards, bass, percussion; Paul McCartney – vocals, bass, guitars, keyboards, percussion; George Harrison – vocals, guitars, bass, percussion; Ringo Starr – drums, percussion, vocals; Billy Preston – keyboards
The Beatles (3 May – 19 September 1969)	John Lennon – vocals, guitars, keyboards, bass, percussion; Paul McCartney – vocals, bass, guitars, keyboards, percussion; George Harrison – vocals, guitars, bass, keyboards, percussion; Ringo Starr – drums, percussion, vocals
The Beatles (20 September 1969 – 10 April 1970) Lennon leaves the group	Paul McCartney – vocals, bass, keyboards, maracas; George Harrison – vocals, guitars; Ringo Starr – drums
The Beatles ("The Threetles") (1994–1996) Anthology reunion ("Free as a Bird" and "Real Love")	Paul McCartney – vocals, bass, guitar, keyboards, double bass, percussion; George Harrison – vocals, guitars, ukulele, percussion; Ringo Starr – drums, vocals, percussion
The Beatles (2022–2023) The completion of "Now and Then"	Paul McCartney — lead and backing vocals, bass, lap steel guitar, keyboards, shaker; Ringo Starr — backing vocals, drums, tambourine, shaker

== Post-Beatles ==
=== John Lennon ===
The Dirty Mac (December 1968)	John Lennon – vocals, rhythm guitar; Eric Clapton – lead guitar; Keith Richards – bass; Mitch Mitchell – drums; Yoko Ono – vocals; Ivry Gitlis – violin
Plastic Ono Band (June 1969)	John Lennon – vocals, acoustic guitar, Yoko Ono – handclaps, tambourines, backing vocals; Tom Smothers – acoustic guitar, backing vocals; Timothy Leary, Rabbi Abraham Feinberg, Joseph Schwartz, Rosemary Woodruff Leary, Petula Clark, Dick Gregory, Allen Ginsberg, Murray the K, Derek Taylor – backing vocals, handclaps
Plastic Ono Band (September 1969)	John Lennon – lead vocals, rhythm guitar; Yoko Ono – vocals; Eric Clapton – lead guitar, backing vocals; Klaus Voormann – bass; Alan White – drums
Plastic Ono Band (September 1969)	John Lennon – lead vocals, rhythm guitar; Yoko Ono – vocals; Eric Clapton – lead guitar, backing vocals; Klaus Voormann – bass; Ringo Starr – drums
Plastic Ono Band (December 1969)	John Lennon – vocals, guitar; Yoko Ono – vocals; Eric Clapton ("Derek Claptoe") – guitar; Delaney & Bonnie ("Bilanie & Donnie") – guitar, percussion (and friends, brass, percussion); Jim Gordon ("Jim Bordom") – drums; George Harrison ("George Harrisong") – guitar; Nicky Hopkins ("Sticky Topkins") – electric piano; Bobby Keys ("Robbie Knees") – sax; Keith Moon ("Kief Spoon") – drums; Billy Preston ("Billy Presstud") – organ; Klaus Voormann ("Raus Doorman") – bass; Alan White ("Dallas White") – drums; Jim Price – trumpet
Plastic Ono Band (January 1970)	John Lennon – vocals, piano, guitar; George Harrison – guitar, piano, backing vocal; Klaus Voormann – bass guitar, electric piano, backing vocal; Alan White – drums, piano, backing vocal; Billy Preston – organ, backing vocal; Yoko Ono – backing vocal; Mal Evans – chimes, handclaps, backing vocal
John Lennon/Plastic Ono Band (September–October 1970)	John Lennon – vocals, guitar, piano, organ; Ringo Starr – drums; Klaus Voormann – bass
Plastic Ono Mothers	John Lennon – guitar, vocals; Yoko Ono – bag, vocals; Frank Zappa – guitar, vocals; Aynsley Dunbar – drums; Bob Harris – keyboards; Jim Pons – bass guitar; Don Preston – Mini-Moog; Ian Underwood – keyboard, woodwinds; Mark Volman – vocals
John Lennon and Yoko Ono/Plastic Ono Band with Elephant's Memory plus Invisible Strings (1972)	John Lennon – guitars, vocals; Yoko Ono – vocals; Jim Keltner – drums, percussion; Wayne 'Tex' Gabriel – guitar; Gary Van Scyoc – bass; Stan Bronstein – saxophone, flute; Adam Ippolito – piano, organ; John La Boosca – piano; Richard Frank Jr. – drums, percussion
Plastic Ono Elephant's Memory Band (1972)	John Lennon – vocals, rhythm guitar, keyboard; Yoko Ono – vocals, keyboard; Jim Keltner – drums; Wayne 'Tex' Gabriel – lead guitar; Gary Van Scyoc – bass; John Ward – bass; Stan Bronstein – saxophone; Adam Ippolito – keyboards; Richard Frank Jr. – drums
Plastic U.F.Ono Band (1973)	John Lennon – vocals, rhythm guitar, slide guitar, percussion; Jim Keltner – drums; David Spinozza – lead guitar; Kenneth Ascher – piano, organ; Gordon Edwards – bass; Arthur Jenkins – percussion; Michael Brecker – saxophone; Sneaky Pete Kleinow – pedal steel guitar; Rick Marrotta – drums
Plastic Ono Nuclear Band (1974)	John Lennon – vocals, guitar, piano; Klaus Voormann – bass; Jim Keltner – drums; Nicky Hopkins – piano; Bobby Keys – saxophone; Kenneth Ascher – electric piano, clavinet, Mellotron; Arthur Jenkins – percussion; Jesse Ed Davis – lead guitar; Eddie Mottau – acoustic guitar

=== Paul McCartney ===
Wings (July 1971 – January 1972)	Paul McCartney – vocals, bass, guitars, piano, keyboards; Linda McCartney – keyboards, vocals; Denny Laine – guitars, bass; Denny Seiwell – drums
Paul McCartney and Wings (January 1972 – August 1973)	Paul McCartney – vocals, bass, guitars, piano, keyboards; Linda McCartney – backing and occasional lead vocals, keyboards; Denny Laine – backing and occasional lead vocals, guitars, bass; Henry McCullough – guitar; Denny Seiwell – drums
Paul McCartney & Wings (August 1973 – May 1974)	Paul McCartney – vocals, bass, guitars, piano, keyboards, drums; Linda McCartney – backing and occasional lead vocals, keyboards; Denny Laine – backing and occasional lead vocals, guitars, bass
Wings (May 1974 – January 1975)	Paul McCartney – vocals, bass, guitars, piano, keyboards; Linda McCartney – backing and occasional lead vocals, keyboards; Denny Laine – backing and occasional lead vocals, guitars, bass; Jimmy McCulloch – backing and occasional lead vocals, guitars, bass; Geoff Britton – drums
Wings (January 1975 – November 1977)	Paul McCartney – vocals, bass, guitars, piano, keyboards; Linda McCartney – backing and occasional lead vocals, keyboards; Denny Laine – backing and occasional lead vocals, guitars, bass; Jimmy McCulloch – backing and occasional lead vocals, guitars, bass; Joe English – backing and occasional lead vocals, drums
Wings (November 1977 – May 1978)	Paul McCartney – vocals, bass, guitars, piano, keyboards, drums; Linda McCartney – backing and occasional lead vocals, keyboards; Denny Laine – backing and occasional lead vocals, guitars, bass
Wings (May 1978 – April 1981)	Paul McCartney – vocals, bass, piano; Linda McCartney – backing and occasional lead vocals, keyboards; Denny Laine – backing and occasional lead vocals, guitars, bass; Laurence Juber – backing vocals, guitars; Steve Holley – backing vocals, drums, percussion
Rockestra (1979)	Paul McCartney – vocals, bass, guitar, piano, keyboards; Linda McCartney – keyboards, vocals; Denny Laine – guitar; Laurence Juber – guitar; Steve Holley – drums; David Gilmour – guitar; Hank Marvin – guitar; Pete Townshend – guitar; John Bonham – drums; Kenney Jones – drums; John Paul Jones – bass, piano; Ronnie Lane – bass; Bruce Thomas – bass; Gary Brooker – keyboards; Tony Ashton – keyboards; Speedy Acquaye – percussion; Tony Carr – percussion; Ray Cooper – percussion; Morris Pert – percussion; Howie Casey – horns; Tony Dorsey – horns; Steve Howard – horns; Thaddeus Richard – horns
Paul McCartney (1989–1990)	Paul McCartney – vocals, bass, piano, guitar; Linda McCartney – keyboards, vocals; Paul Wickens – keyboards; Hamish Stuart – guitar; Robbie McIntosh – guitar; Chris Whitten – drums
Paul McCartney (1991–1993)	Paul McCartney – vocals, bass, piano, guitar; Linda McCartney – keyboards, vocals; Paul Wickens – keyboards; Hamish Stuart – guitar; Robbie McIntosh – guitar; Blair Cunningham – drums
Paul McCartney (2002–present)	Paul McCartney – vocals, bass, piano, guitars, ukulele; Rusty Anderson – backing and occasional lead vocals, guitars; Brian Ray – backing vocals, guitars, bass, percussion; Paul Wickens – backing vocals, keyboards; Abe Laboriel Jr – backing and occasional lead vocals, drums, percussion

=== George Harrison ===
Delaney & Bonnie & Friends (1969)	Bonnie Bramlett – vocals; Delaney Bramlett – guitars, vocals; Eric Clapton – guitar, vocals; Leon Russell – guitar, keyboards; Dave Mason – guitar; George Harrison – guitar; Bobby Whitlock – organ, keyboards, vocals; Carl Radle – bass; Jim Gordon – drums, percussion; Tex Johnson – percussion; Doug Bartenfeld – guitar; Bobby Keys – saxophone; Jim Price – trombone, trumpet; Rita Coolidge – backing vocals
George Harrison & Friends (1971)	George Harrison – vocals, guitar; Ravi Shankar – sitar; Bob Dylan – vocals, acoustic guitar, harmonica; Leon Russell – piano, vocals, bass, backing vocals; Ringo Starr – drums, vocals, tambourine; Billy Preston – organ, vocals; Eric Clapton –guitar; Jesse Ed Davis – guitar; Klaus Voormann – bass; Jim Keltner – drums; Pete Ham – acoustic guitar; Tom Evans – twelve-string acoustic guitar; Joey Molland – acoustic guitar; Mike Gibbins – tambourine, maracas
George Harrison (1974)	George Harrison – vocals, guitar; Tom Scott – saxophones, flute; Billy Preston – vocals, organ, clavinet, synthesizer, backing vocals; Robben Ford – guitar; Jim Horn – saxophones, flute; Chuck Findley – trumpet, flute; Emil Richards – marimba, percussion; Willie Weeks – bass; Andy Newmark – drums; Jim Keltner – drums; Kumar Shankar – percussion
Traveling Wilburys (1988)	Nelson Wilbury (George Harrison) – vocals, guitar; Otis Wilbury (Jeff Lynne) – vocals, guitar, keyboards; Charlie T. Wilbury Jr (Tom Petty) – vocals, bass, acoustic guitar; Lefty Wilbury (Roy Orbison) – vocals, acoustic guitar; Lucky Wilbury (Bob Dylan) – vocals, acoustic guitar, harmonica
Traveling Wilburys (1990)	Spike Wilbury (George Harrison) – vocals, guitar, mandolin, sitar; Clayton Wilbury (Jeff Lynne) – vocals, acoustic guitar, bass, keyboards; Boo Wilbury (Bob Dylan) – vocals, acoustic guitar, harmonica; Muddy Wilbury (Tom Petty) – vocals, acoustic guitar, bass guitar
George Harrison (1991)	George Harrison – vocals, guitar; Eric Clapton – guitar; Andy Fairweather-Low – guitar; Nathan East – bass; Greg Phillinganes – keyboards, organ; Chuck Leavell – piano, keyboards; Steve Ferrone – drums; Ray Cooper – percussion; Katie Kissoon – background vocals; Tessa Niles – background vocals
The Hi Jack Band (1992)	George Harrison – vocals, guitar; Gary Moore – vocals, guitar; Joe Walsh – vocals, guitar; Greg Phillinganes – keyboards; Will Lee – bass; Mike Campbell – guitar; Chuck Leavell – keyboards; Steve Ferrone – drums; Andy Fairweather-Low – guitar; Ray Cooper – percussion; Katie Kissoon – background vocals; Tessa Niles – background vocals; Ringo Starr – drums; Dhani Harrison – guitar

=== Ringo Starr ===
Ringo Starr & His All-Starr Band (1989)	Ringo Starr – drums, vocals; Joe Walsh – guitar, piano, talkbox, vocals; Nils Lofgren – guitar, accordion, vocals; Dr. John – piano, vocals; Billy Preston – keyboards, vocals; Rick Danko – bass, vocals; Levon Helm – drums, harmonica, vocals; Clarence Clemons – saxophone, tambourine, percussion, vocals; Jim Keltner – drums
Ringo Starr & His All-Starr Band (1992)	Ringo Starr – drums, vocals; Joe Walsh – guitar, keyboards, talk box, vocals; Nils Lofgren – guitar, vocals; Todd Rundgren – guitar, keyboards, percussion, vocals; Dave Edmunds – guitar, vocals; Burton Cummings – keyboards, guitar, tambourine, harmonica, vocals; Timothy B. Schmit – bass, guitar, vocals; Zak Starkey – drums; Timmy Cappello – saxophone, percussion, vocals
Ringo Starr & His All-Starr Band (1995)	Ringo Starr – drums, vocals; Randy Bachman – guitar, vocals; Mark Farner – guitar, harmonica, vocals; Billy Preston – keyboards, vocals; Felix Cavaliere – organ, keyboards, vocals; John Entwistle – bass, vocals; Zak Starkey – drums; Mark Rivera – saxophone, percussion, guitar, vocals
Ringo Starr & His All-Starr Band (1997–1998)	Ringo Starr – drums, vocals; Peter Frampton – guitar, vocals; Gary Brooker – keyboards, organ, vocals; Jack Bruce – bass, keyboards, guitar, vocals; Simon Kirke – drums, vocals; Mark Rivera – saxophone, guitar, organ, keyboards, percussion, vocals; Scott Gordon – harmonica (1998)
Ringo Starr & His All-Starr Band (1999)	Ringo Starr – drums, vocals; Todd Rundgren – guitar, percussion, vocals; Gary Brooker – organ, keyboards, vocals; Jack Bruce – bass, keyboards, vocals; Simon Kirke – drums, vocals; Timmy Cappello – saxophone, keyboards, harmonica, guitar, vocals
Ringo Starr & His All-Starr Band (2000)	Ringo Starr – drums, vocals; Dave Edmunds – guitar, vocals; Eric Carmen – keyboards, guitar, bass, vocals; Jack Bruce – bass, keyboards, vocals; Simon Kirke – drums, vocals; Mark Rivera – saxophone, harmonica, vocals
Ringo Starr & His All-Starr Band (2001)	Ringo Starr – drums, vocals; Roger Hodgson – guitar, keyboards, vocals; Ian Hunter – guitar, keyboards, vocals; Howard Jones – keyboards, vocals; Greg Lake – bass, acoustic guitar, vocals; Sheila E. – drums, vocals; Mark Rivera – saxophone, percussion, guitar, bass, harmonica, flute, vocals
Ringo Starr & His All-Starr Band (2003)	Ringo Starr – drums, keyboards, vocals; Colin Hay – guitar, vocals; Paul Carrack – keyboards, guitar, vocals; John Waite – bass, guitar, vocals; Sheila E. – drums, vocals; Mark Rivera – saxophone, flute, bass, guitar, vocals
Ringo Starr & His All-Starr Band (2006)	Ringo Starr – drums, vocals; Billy Squier – guitar, vocals; Richard Marx – guitar, keyboards, vocals; Edgar Winter – keyboards, saxophone, vocals; Rod Argent – organ, keyboards, vocals; Sheila E. – drums, vocals; Hamish Stuart – bass, vocals
Ringo Starr & His All-Starr Band (2008)	Ringo Starr – drums, vocals; Billy Squier – guitar, bass, vocals; Colin Hay – guitar, vocals; Edgar Winter – keyboards, saxophone, vocals; Gary Wright – keyboards, vocals; Hamish Stuart – bass, guitar, vocals; Gregg Bissonette - drums, vocals
Ringo Starr & His All-Starr Band (2010–2011)	Ringo Starr – drums, vocals; Wally Palmar – guitar, harmonica, vocals; Rick Derringer – guitar, vocals; Edgar Winter – keyboards, saxophone, vocals; Gary Wright – keyboards, vocals; Richard Page – bass, vocals; Gregg Bissonette – drums, vocals
Ringo Starr & His All-Starr Band (2012–2013)	Ringo Starr – drums, keyboards, percussion, vocals; Steve Lukather – guitar, vocals; Gregg Rolie – organ, keyboards, vocals; Todd Rundgren – guitar, harmonica, bass, percussion, keyboards, vocals; Richard Page – bass, acoustic guitar, vocals; Mark Rivera – saxophone, percussion, keyboards, acoustic guitar, vocals; Gregg Bissonette – drums, percussion, vocals
Ringo Starr & His All-Starr Band (2014)	Ringo Starr – drums, keyboard, vocals; Steve Lukather – lead and rhythm guitar, vocals; Gregg Rolie – organ, keyboards, vocals; Todd Rundgren – lead and rhythm guitar, bass, percussion, harmonica, keyboard, vocals; Richard Page – bass, acoustic guitar, vocals; Warren Ham – saxophone, percussion, keyboards, vocals; Gregg Bissonette – drums, percussion
Ringo Starr & His All-Starr Band (2018)	Ringo Starr – drums, percussion, piano, vocals; Steve Lukather – guitars, vocals; Colin Hay – guitars, harmonica, vocals; Gregg Rolie – keyboards, vocals; Graham Gouldman – bass, vocals; Gregg Bissonette – drums, trumpet, vocals; Warren Ham – saxophone, harmonica, flute, percussion, keyboards, vocals
Ringo Starr & His All-Starr Band (2019)	Ringo Starr – drums, percussion, piano, vocals; Steve Lukather – guitars, bass, vocals; Colin Hay – guitars, harmonica, vocals; Gregg Rolie – keyboards, vocals; Hamish Stuart – bass, guitar, vocals; Gregg Bissonette – drums, trumpet, vocals; Warren Ham – saxophone, harmonica, flute, percussion, keyboards, vocals

=== Pete Best ===
Lee Curtis and the All-Stars (Sept. 1962 – mid. 1963)	Lee Curtis (aka Peter Flannery) – vocals; Frank Bowen – guitar; Tony Waddington – rhythm guitar; Wayne Bickerton – bass; Pete Best – drums
The Original All-Stars / The Pete Best Four / The Pete Best Combo (1963–1968)	Pete Best – drums; Tony Waddington – lead guitar, vocals; Wayne Bickerton – bass, vocals; Tommy McGurk – guitar
The Pete Best Band (1988–2025)	Pete Best – drums; Phil Melia – lead guitar, vocals; Tony Flynn – guitar, vocals; Paul Parry – bass, vocals; Roag Best – drums

=== Stuart Sutcliffe ===
The Bats (2–9 February 1962)	Peter Bosch – guitar; Rüdiger Neber – drums; Waldemar Krop – guitar; Stuart Sutcliffe – bass
