= Les Maguire =

British pianist (1941–2023)

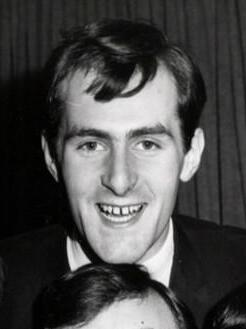
- Maguire in 1964

Background information
- Born: Leslie Charles Maguire; 27 December 1941; Wallasey, England
- Origin: Liverpool
- Died: 25 November 2023 (aged 81) Liverpool, England
- Genres: Merseybeat, pop, rock and roll
- Occupation: Musician
- Instruments: Piano; saxophone; vocals
- Years active: 1961–1970; 1990s-2000s
- Formerly of: The Undertakers; Gerry and the Pacemakers; Hog Owl; Ian and the Zodiacs

Leslie Charles Maguire (27 December 1941 – 25 November 2023) was an English musician who was a principal member of the Merseybeat band Gerry and the Pacemakers from 1961 to 1966.

== Early life ==
Leslie Charles Maguire was born in Wallasey, Merseyside, and started his career playing tenor saxophone in a Liverpool pop group called the Vegas Five, which would eventually evolve into The Undertakers.

== Gerry and the Pacemakers ==
In 1961, Maguire joined Gerry and the Pacemakers, replacing the group's original pianist, Arthur "Mack" MacMahon. The same year, on 19 October, the Beatles and Gerry and the Pacemakers merged to become the 'Beatmakers' for a one-off performance in Litherland Town Hall. The line-up comprised Gerry Marsden, George Harrison, Paul McCartney, John Lennon, Les Chadwick, Pete Best, Freddy Marsden, plus vocalist Karl Terry from the Cruisers with Maguire on saxophone.

After signing to EMI Records In 1963, and being managed by Brian Epstein, Gerry and the Pacemakers achieved immediate success in the British chart and later in the United States. They were the first group to hit number one in the British charts with their first three singles, starting with "How Do You Do It?".

The band would go on to have many more hits including "I Like It", "You'll Never Walk Alone", "Ferry Cross the Mersey", and "I'm the One", among many others. The Pacemakers guest appeared on shows such as The Ed Sullivan Show and Top of the Pops, were featured in the 1964 filmed event T.A.M.I. Show, and starred in a film of their own, titled Ferry Cross the Mersey.

Maguire remained with the group until it faded from the public eye towards the end of the 1960s.

== Post-Pacemaker career ==
Maguire briefly fronted the Delta blues band Hog Owl in 1970, and teamed up with the Pacemakers for occasional reunion performances.

In the late 1990s he played with Ian and the Zodiacs for several years. The band consisted of Maguire on keyboards/backing vocals, Ian Edward on lead vocals/guitar, Barry Walmsley (later Mal Little) on lead guitar, Colin Fabb on bass, and Carl Hardin on drums. Maguire plays on a 2000 live album by the Zodiacs, which included a performance of the Pacemaker song "Don't Let the Sun Catch You Crying".

== Personal life ==
After the Pacemakers split, he and former band member Les Chadwick bought and operated a garage. Maguire joined in the Royal Navy and saw active service in the 1982 Falklands War. He lived in Liverpool.

Maguire met his wife Brigitte while touring with the Pacemakers in Germany. They had two daughters, Stephanie and Karin, the latter died in 1990. Brigitte died in 2012.

Maguire appeared in the media for his Pacemaker and Beatle memorabilia. In 2016, Maguire was searching through his loft when he found a 10-inch 78rpm vinyl recording of The Beatles performing "Till There Was You" and "Hello Little Girl". It was given to him by Brian Epstein, after being given back to Brian by George Martin. Maguire appeared on a 2022 episode of Antiques Roadshow with a silver disc that was awarded to the band for their hit single "You'll Never Walk Alone" in 1963. Antique expert Raj Bisram suggested he sell the disc to either the Liverpool F.C. museum or to the Liverpool City Council, rather than auction it.

Following the deaths of Freddie Marsden in 2006, Les Chadwick in 2019, and Gerry Marsden in 2021, Les Maguire was the last surviving member of the 1960s Pacemakers lineup. He died at Aintree University Hospital on 25 November 2023, at the age of 81, after a short illness. He was survived by one daughter, two grandchildren, and one great-grandchild. His funeral took place in West Lancashire on 12 December 2023.

== Discography ==
Selected Gerry and the Pacemakers singles

- "How Do You Do It?" (1963)
- "I Like It" (1963)
- "You'll Never Walk Alone" (1963)

(See full discography at Gerry and the Pacemakers discography)

Ian and the Zodiacs

- "Ian & The Zodiacs – Live... And More" (2000)
