= Louise Cordet =

English singer (born 1945)

- Born: Louise Boisot; 8 February 1945 (age 81); Wraysbury, Berkshire, England
- Genre: Pop
- Occupations: Singer, actress, publicist
- Instrument: Vocals
- Years active: 1962–1964
- Label: Decca

Louise Cordet (born Louise Boisot; 8 February 1945) is an English retired singer who also sang in French, best known as a one-hit wonder for her 1962 single, "I'm Just a Baby".

== Early life ==
Louise Cordet is the daughter of Captain Marcel Boisot of the Free French Air Force and France-born Greek actress Hélène Cordet (née Foufounis).

In 1940, as a trainee cadet pilot with no more than 20 hours' flying time, her father flew a Morane 315 training aircraft without navigation equipment or maps from Meknès in Morocco to Gibraltar in response to Charles de Gaulle's appeal of 18 June.

Cordet is a goddaughter of Prince Philip, Duke of Edinburgh, and was educated first at the French Lycée in Kensington, London, and then at a convent school.

== Music career ==
When she began singing she took her stage name from her mother, Hélène Cordet, who had adopted the surname early in her own professional career, as an actress and TV hostess.

After signing to Decca Records, she released "I'm Just a Baby" in 1962, which hit No. 13 on the UK Singles Chart. The song was composed by Jerry Lordan and produced by the former Shadows drummer Tony Meehan.

She also appeared in the films Just For Fun (1963) and Just for You (1964).

Cordet undertook tours with the Beatles, Roy Orbison and Gerry and the Pacemakers. Gerry Marsden is said to have initially written the song "Don't Let the Sun Catch You Crying" for Cordet, although the Gerry and the Pacemakers recording was released almost simultaneously, in April 1964. She recorded a four-track EP for French Decca – three tracks in French (including a French-language version of the English song, "Around and Around", plus her version of the Beatles' song "From Me to You"). Her final single was a cover version of the Motown tune "Two Lovers". Composed by Smokey Robinson, Cordet's version of "Two Lovers" featured Jimmy Page on guitar. She also toured in 1963 with Paul & Paula, Tony Meehan and Jet Harris, with the concert promoter Arthur Howes, but by 1965 she had stopped recording.

She served as the French pronunciation adviser at Marianne Faithfull's Decca Records recording session on 11 May 1965.

== Personal life ==
Louise Cordet is married to a Greek national and has three children. Her eldest son is the singer Alexi Murdoch. She now lives in Greece, but also has a home in London. Her late brother, Max Boisot, was an architect, and professor of strategic management at the ESADE business school in Barcelona.

== Discography ==
=== Singles ===
- Decca F11476 (1962): "I'm Just a Baby" / "In a Matter of Moments" UK No. 13
- Decca F11524 (1962): "Sweet Enough" / "Someone Else's Fool"
- Decca F11673 (1963): "Around and Around" / "Which Way the Wind Blows"
- Decca F11824 (1964): "Don't Let the Sun Catch You Crying" / "Loving Baby"
- Decca F11875 (1964): "Don't Make Me Over" / "Two Lovers"
- Decca (France) EP 454.089 (1962): "I'm Just a Baby", "In a Matter of Moments", "Sweet Enough", "Someone Else's Fool"
- Decca EP DFE 8515 (1962) and 454.096 (1963, France): The Sweet Beat of Louise Cordet: "She's Got You", "We Know Why", "Everytime", "Crazy Kind of Love"
- Decca (France) EP 454.100 (1963): Louise Cordet: "Faire le Grand Voyage", "Que m'a-t-il-Fait?", "From Me To You", "L'amour Tourne en Rond"
- Decca (France) EP 457.022 (1964): "Pour Toi", "Laisse le Soleil Sécher tes Larmes", "J'Aime Trop Johnny", "Dix Mille Fois"

=== Compilation albums ===
- Harkit HRKCD 8358 (2010): I'm Just a Baby
- RPM Retro 890 (2011): The Sweet Beat of Louise Cordet: Complete UK Decca Recordings
