= Don't Let the Sun Catch You Crying =

Single by Gerry and the Pacemakers

from the album Don't Let The Sun Catch You Crying
- B-side: "Show Me That You Care" (UK and Canada); "Away from You" (US)
- Released: April 1964
- Recorded: December 9, 1963
- Genre: Merseybeat, pop
- Length: 2:38
- Label: EMI Columbia (UK, Australia, New Zealand); Laurie (US); Capitol (Canada)
- Songwriters: Gerry Marsden, Freddie Marsden, Les Chadwick, Les Maguire
- Producer: George Martin

Gerry and the Pacemakers singles chronology
"I'm the One" (1964)	"Don't Let the Sun Catch You Crying" (1964)	"It's Gonna Be Alright" (1964)

"Don't Let the Sun Catch You Crying" is a song written by Gerry Marsden, Freddie Marsden, Les Chadwick and Les Maguire, the members of British beat group Gerry and the Pacemakers. It was first recorded and issued as a single by Louise Cordet in February 1964. Shortly after Cordet's version failed to chart, the song was recorded by Gerry and the Pacemakers themselves in April 1964. That version became an international hit and remains one of their best-known singles.

== History ==
The song was given, initially, to Louise Cordet, a singer who had previously toured with the group as well as with the Beatles. Her version was produced by Tony Meehan and released on Decca Records in February 1964. The group then decided to issue its own version. The record, like the group's earlier releases, was produced by George Martin.

It was released in April 1964 as Gerry and the Pacemakers' fifth single in Britain, and spent 11 weeks on the United Kingdom's Record Retailer chart, reaching No. 6. In the US, it was the breakthrough single for the group, spending 12 weeks on the Billboard Hot 100 and reaching No. 4. The song debuted at No. 4 in the first issue of Canada's RPM Top Forty-5s chart, while reaching No. 5 on Canada's CHUM Hit Parade and No. 6 on New Zealand's Lever Hit Parade.

Cash Box described it as "an extremely pretty soft Latin beat romancer that really grows on you with each listen."

Gerry and the Pacemakers performed the song on their first US television show, The Ed Sullivan Show on 3 May 1964. The group's earlier UK hit singles – "How Do You Do It?", "I Like It", "You'll Never Walk Alone" and "I'm the One" – were then reissued in the US to follow up its success, but "Don't Let the Sun Catch You Crying" remained their biggest hit in the United States.

== Chart history ==
=== Weekly charts ===
Chart (1963–1964)	Peak position
Australia (Kent Music Report)	21
Canada (RPM) Top Singles	4
New Zealand (Lever Hit Parade)	6
UK	6
U.S. Billboard Hot 100	4

=== Year-end charts ===
Chart (1964)	Rank
UK	84

== Cover versions ==
The song has been recorded by many other singers, including Steve Lawrence (1964), José Feliciano (1968), Rickie Lee Jones (1989), Gloria Estefan (1994), Robben Ford (1995), Canadian boyband B4-4 (2000), Paul Carrack (2010), Post Image with John Greaves (2011), Nellie McKay (2015), Ronnie Spector (2016), and Colin Hay (2021).
