= The Black Knights (band) =

Merseybeat band

The Black Knights were a Merseybeat three-piece band formed in Liverpool in the early 1960s. Their lead singer and rhythm guitarist was Ken Griffiths, the bassist and backing vocalist was Bill Kenny, and the drummer was initially Taffy Jones, who left to join The Tempos and later Allan Schroeder, formerly of Cliff Roberts & the Rockers.

The band successfully auditioned for the Gerry & the Pacemakers film Ferry Cross the Mersey, and their amplifiers were sponsored by Selmer UK. Their debut single "I Gotta Woman" / "Angel of Love", written by Griffiths and produced by George Martin at Abbey Road Studios, was released in 1965. They followed with a tour of the United Kingdom (with The Animals and The Moody Blues) and a six-week residency at the Star-Club in Hamburg, but split up shortly after returning to the UK. Schroeder later reformed the band under the same name, performing live in the 1990s and 2000s.
