= Ferry Cross the Mersey (album) =

- USA release cover design

Soundtrack album by Gerry & The Pacemakers
- Released: 1965
- Recorded: 20 March–5 June 1964
- Studio: EMI Studios, London
- Genre: Merseybeat
- Label: United Artists (USA); Columbia (EMI) (UK)
- Producer: George Martin

Professional ratings
Review scores
Source	Rating
Record Mirror	3/5 stars
Uncut	3/5 stars

Ferry Cross the Mersey is the soundtrack for the 1965 film of the same title, starring Gerry and the Pacemakers, who recorded the titular song. Both the UK and US editions feature music by the Pacemakers, although other artists featured include the George Martin Orchestra, Cilla Black, the Fourmost, the Black Knights, Earl Royce and the Olympics, and the Blackwells.

It was released on the Columbia label in the UK and United Artists in the US. It contained the singles "It's Gonna Be Alright" (previously released August 1964) and "Ferry Cross the Mersey" (released December 1964 as a teaser for the film).

A CD reissue in a digipak consists of both the mono and stereo versions of the album. The original recording has no backing vocals - just the lone reverberated voice of Gerry Marsden.

== Track listing ==
All tracks composed by Gerry Marsden and performed by Gerry and the Pacemakers, except where indicated.

=== UK version ===
No.	Title	Writer(s)	Length
1.	"It's Gonna Be Alright"		2:22
2.	"Why Oh Why"	Marsden, Marsden, Chadwick, Maguire	1:47
3.	"Fall In Love"		1:45
4.	"Think About Love"		1:45
5.	"I Love You Too" (performed by The Fourmost)	Jacques - Ryan	2:02
6.	"All Quiet On The Mersey Front" (performed by the George Martin Orchestra)	George Martin	2:07
7.	"This Thing Called Love"		2:08
8.	"Baby You're So Good To Me"		2:33
9.	"I'll Wait For You"		2:09
10.	"She's The Only Girl For Me"		2:30
11.	"Is It Love?" (performed by Cilla Black)	Hayley Willis	2:55
12.	"Ferry Cross The Mersey"		2:20

=== US version ===
No.	Title	Writer(s)	Length
1.	"Ferry Cross the Mersey"		2:21
2.	"It's Gonna Be Alright"		2:08
3.	"Why Oh Why"		1:45
4.	"I Gotta Woman" (performed by The Black Knights)	Griffiths	1:58
5.	"Fall in Love"		1:46
6.	"Think About Love"		1:45
7.	"This Thing Called Love"		2:10
8.	"Baby You're So Good To Me"		2:23
9.	"I'll Wait For You"		2:09
10.	"Shake a Tail Feather" (performed by Earl Royce and the Olympics)		2:21
11.	"She's the Only Girl for Me"		2:24
12.	"Why Don't You Love Me" (performed by The Blackwells)		2:17

== Personnel ==
Gerry and the Pacemakers

- Gerry Marsden – guitar, lead vocals
- Fred Marsden – drums, backing vocals
- Les Maguire – piano, backing vocals
- Les "Chad" Chadwick – bass guitar
