= Ferry Cross the Mersey (film) =

1964 British film by Jeremy Summers

- Directed by: Jeremy Summers
- Written by: David Franden, Tony Warren (story)
- Produced by: Brian Epstein, Michael Holden
- Starring: Gerry and the Pacemakers; Cilla Black; Julie Samuel
- Cinematography: Gilbert Taylor
- Edited by: John Victor-Smith
- Music by: Gerry Marsden, George Martin
- Production company: Subafilms
- Distributed by: United Artists
- Release dates: December 1964 (London); 13 December 1964 (UK)
- Running time: 88 minutes
- Country: United Kingdom
- Language: English

Ferry Cross the Mersey is a 1964 British musical film directed by Jeremy Summers and starring Gerry and the Pacemakers. It was written by David Franden from a story by Tony Warren.

The film tells the story of a group of art students as they humorously try to navigate the Liverpool beat scene. After the group enters a music competition, their instruments are misplaced but are ultimately found in time for them to take the stage and win the contest.

It is frequently considered to be Gerry and the Pacemakers' version of the Beatles' A Hard Day's Night.

== Plot ==
The film opens with Gerry and the Pacemakers stepping off a plane after returning from a trip to America. They are greeted by screaming young fans who chase them down the street as they drive off. Once they are far enough from the crowd, the setting shifts to a scene of the group in the studio recording the song "It's Gonna Be Alright".

The movie then goes back in time to before the band made it big. Gerry gives a monologue about living in Liverpool and meeting the band members overlaid on top of shots of children playing and mingling in the street. The band is shown playing "Why Oh Why?" at the Cavern Club to a screaming audience. The next day, Aunt Lil tries to wake Gerry up from bed with a cowbell. To her surprise, he is already awake and listening to the radio. After checking the time, Gerry rushes out of bed and gets dressed in a fast-motion sequence before meeting his family for breakfast. After eating, he scooters off to catch the ferry ("All Quiet on the Mersey Front") where the rest of the band is waiting for him. They sing "Ferry Cross the Mersey" to the surrounding passengers. When the boat docks, they all scooter off to the art school. Before the art instructor enters the room and tells everyone to get to work, Dodie (Julie Samuel) reminds Gerry to come up with a good song to play at the beat competition. When the instructor leaves, the Pacemakers sing "Fall in Love". Once class ends, Dodie goes her separate ways as the group goes for lunch at a Chinese restaurant. As they wait for their food, they perform "This Thing Called Love".

In the meantime, Dodie meets with Jack Hanson and convinces him to consider managing the Pacemakers. He is invited to visit the band rehearsing "Think About Love" in a warehouse. After seeing the group along with an enthusiastic crowd that has arrived to watch as well, he offers to manage them. Gerry arrives home to join an orchestral rehearsal with Aunt Lil and company before retiring to his room to play "She's the Only Girl for Me". He later receives a letter saying Dodie had been involved in a car pile-up; the four men travel to her mansion to check up on her.

Dodie is in good health but tells the group that they've got stiff competition. They play "I'll Wait for You" in her music room. On Saturday, the Pacemakers – donning their new outfits – meet Hanson at a music store to try out new instruments ("Baby You're So Good to Me").

On the day of the competition, they rent a car from a funeral home to carry their gear and travel off to the Locarno ballroom. Jimmy Savile is the MC and opens the show with the Fourmost playing "I Love You Too"–they receive moderately high applause on the "Audiometer" which uses audience applause to measure who will win. The band is told to get ready after the number, but they discover the instruments they've dropped off have been accidentally taken to the airport. As other bands take the stage, they try to out-run the police while making sure to get their gear back in time. Back at the ballroom, the Black Knights among others take the stage. Hanson becomes increasingly anxious and asks Cilla Black to perform early ("Is it Love?").

Gerry and the Pacemakers find the group that had taken their gear and arrive back to the ballroom just as Black's performance ends. They take the stage just in time to play "It's Gonna Be Alright" to the exuberant crowd. The Audiometer puts them over the top and they win. The movie ends with the main characters on the ferry celebrating.

== Cast ==
- Gerry Marsden as himself
- Fred Marsden as himself
- Les Chadwick as himself
- Les Maguire as himself
- Julie Samuel as Dodie Dawson
- Mona Washbourne as Aunt Lil
- George A. Cooper as Mr. Lumsden
- Deryck Guyler as Trasler
- T.P. McKenna as Jack Hanson
- Cilla Black as herself
- The Fourmost as themselves
- Jimmy Savile as himself
- Eric Barker as Mr. Dawson
- Patricia Lawrence as Miss Kneave
- Margaret Nolan as Norah
- Bernard Sharpe as art student
- Donald Gee as art student
- Dorothy Sue as the waitress
- Andy Ho as the restaurant manager
- Keith Smith as Dawson's chauffeur
- Mischa De La Motte as Dawson's butler
- Earl Royce and the Olympics as themselves
- The Blackwells as themselves
- The Black Knights as themselves
- The Kubas as themselves

== Production ==
After Gerry and the Pacemakers' successful 1964 trip to America, manager Brian Epstein toyed with the idea of creating a film for the band. Tony Warren, creator of the soap opera Coronation Street, was hired as writer; he came up with a plot involving the band and ferryboats. Writer David Franden was hired in his place when Warren proved unable to complete a script despite "downing bottles of whisky".

The movie was filmed over the course of three months under the direction of Jeremy Summers. For authenticity, many scenes were shot near the home of Gerry and the Pacemakers' frontman Gerry Marsden. These locations included the Mountwood ferry on the River Mersey, the Albert Dock, The Cavern Club, Frank Hessy's music store, and the Locarno ballroom.

The soundtrack was released the same year; Marsden wrote nine new songs for the film. Cilla Black is also featured with her song "Is it Love?", along with the Fourmost with their track "I Love You Too". The album is rounded out with an instrumental by the George Martin Orchestra.

Future Doctor Who actress Elisabeth Sladen appeared in the film as an uncredited extra; disc jockey Steve Wright appeared in the crowd as a boy.

== Release ==
Since its theatrical release, Ferry Cross the Mersey has rarely been shown on British television, nor was it released on video. A DVD was published by Mastersound in 2007.

== Reception ==
The Monthly Film Bulletin wrote: "This attempt to repeat the success formula of A Hard Day's Night without the Beatles and without Dick Lester's lively up-to-the-minute direction, doesn't come off – despite speeded-up photography, silent film titles and the forced exuberance of Gerry and the Pacemakers playing and singing anywhere and everywhere from a stately home to a toilet-fittings warehouse. In the competition finale, this group sound, and look, like conservative classicists by comparison with some of their uninhibitedly moronic rivals – not that much can be heard, at this juncture, above the screaming hysteria of the adolescent audience."

Eugene Archer of The New York Times wrote: "In Ferry Cross the Mersey, the British pop rock group known as Gerry and the Pacemakers have made an unabashed imitation of the Beatles. They could have done a lot worse. The modest musical comedy... tries to compensate in vigor for its lack of originality in following A Hard Day's Night. Chasing the quartet of Liverpool lads through the predictable mobs of screaming adolescents, the director, Jeremy Summers, makes a big thing of the fast action camera. Using the device that gave the long-haired nonconformists a high point in a five-minute play period, he shows the willing Gerry Marsden hopping out of bed, dressing, brushing his teeth and rushing off at a record-breaking pace. ... It is mildly funny – but we have seen it all before. There, of course, is the problem. The Beatle movie was fresh and unconventional, and it had a point – a highly sophisticated one, too. The only point in the new effort is slavish dedication to the principle of past success.This includes the musicians as well as the filmmakers. Their opening number, something about "All Right, All Right, All Right," is, well, all right, but most of the songs are standard copies of better beats."

BoxOffice wrote: "Produced by Michael Holden, the screenplay by David Franden has a stronger plot than the Beatles' film, being based partly on Gerry Marsden's success story, but will have less appeal except to the younger fans, especially those who collect their recordings. The title also means little in the U.S. referring to the daily ferry ride across Liverpool's Mersey River. However, director Jeremy Summers maintains a lively pace throughout with time out for a few songs, considerable horseplay by Marsden and his three colleagues, just a dash of romance and a whirlwind chase climax, complete with what looks like the old Keystone Kops, a sequence that any age group will howl at. The best-known British player, Mona Washbourne ... has a warm, human quality as Gerry's motherly Aunt Lil and Gerry does a good job of playing himself."

Variety wrote: "The Mersey Sound which put pop music on the map in this country gets a fair belting in this modest, routine picture designed to exploit Gerry and the Pacemakers, one of Britain's top pop groups. ... It is noisy, corny and full of cliches but Jeremy Summers has directed with zest and some vitality and the pic goes at a reasonable lick. ... Gerry Marsden, as well as writing the songs, leads his group with ebulience but shows little sign of being an actor. As his rich girl friend Julie Samuel makes her debut. She is a pretty, young blonde, but her inexperience also shows up starkly. Jimmy Savile, a zany disk jockey, appears as himself, as does Cilla Black, a top British thrush, who sings one song and utters a few lines with a pallid personality and dubious success. T. P. McKenna scores as the manager and Mona Washbourne, Eric Barker, Deryck Guyler, Patricia Lawrence and George A. Cooper bring a little of their professional expertise to bear on unrewarding roles. Most of the humor is naive in the extreme but director Summers gives the events as much pep as possible and has extracted some good fun from the frantic car chase sequences."

A reviewer from The Daily Cinema also saw similarities between the two films but found Ferry to be a "winner". They praised the humour, "exuberant personalities" of the band, and the soundtrack.
