= George Sephton =

English stadium announcer

George Sephton is a stadium announcer, matchday DJ, and after dinner speaker, known primarily for his work at Anfield for home fixtures of Liverpool Football Club. He is popularly known as The Voice of Anfield, and is England's second longest-serving stadium announcer, behind Peter Gilham of Brentford.

Sephton's relationship with Liverpool Football Club began in 1971, when he wrote to club secretary, Peter Robinson, applying to be the stadium announcer. His first match was against Nottingham Forest on 14 August 1971, which also marked the debut of Kevin Keegan. Since then, Sephton has occupied the room above the scoreboard on the Kop side of the Kenny Dalglish stand, for all but a handful of home fixtures. His duties include DJing for almost two hours before kick off, operating the scoreboard, announcing goalscorers and substitutions, and making commercial announcements. However, his most important role is playing You'll Never Walk Alone over the PA system just before kickoff; a tradition at Anfield that dates back to October 1963. He has played You'll Never Walk Alone at the end of special Liverpool victories as well, notably the second leg of the 2005 Champions League semifinal against Chelsea that saw Liverpool qualify for the final in Istanbul. Sephton plays a major role in the Anfield matchday experience.

Sephton is known for championing new music from local bands while DJing. His musical selections are well-liked, and there is even a thread on the popular Red and White Kop message board dedicated to his halftime choices. He is known to play the original songs from which player or manager songs, sung by supporters, are adapted. Examples include La Bamba by Ritchie Valens (adapted by fans for Rafael Benitez) and Sit Down by James (adapted by fans for Mohamed Salah).

Kenny Dalglish has said of George Sephton: "George is part of the history and tradition of this club and it would be more relevant if he left than if I left." Currently, Sephton continues his duties at Anfield, and is also an after dinner speaker, sometimes in conjunction with other Liverpool legends. His charity events and contributions around the club and the city are well known, and he engages with Liverpool supporters worldwide on his Twitter account.

Sephton announced in May 2025 that he would retire at the end of the 2024–25 season; his final game was a 1–1 draw between Liverpool and Crystal Palace that saw Liverpool lift the Premier League trophy as champions.
