= Disk-O-Tek Holiday =

1966 American-British film by Douglas Hickox

- Theatrical release poster
- Directed by: Douglas Hickox
- Release date: 8 January 1966
- Running time: 63 minutes
- Country: United Kingdom/America
- Language: English

Disk-O-Tek Holiday is a 1966 American-British film. It was originally a 1964 British film called Just For You, directed by Douglas Hickox and starring Sam Costa and the master of ceremonies, which was recut and re-edited with American numbers added; according to the British Film Institute, the linking scenes featuring Costa were replaced with artist introductions by Katherine Quint and Casey Paxton.

== Original cast ==
- Sam Costa
- Freddie and the Dreamers
- Jackie and the Raindrops
- Peter and Gordon
- The Bachelors
- The Merseybeats
- The Applejacks
- Mark Wynter
- Louise Cordet
- Millie Small
- A Band of Angels
- Doug Sheldon
- Al Saxon
- The Orchids
- Johnny B. Great
- The Warriors
- Judy Jason
- Caroline Lee

== Reception ==
The Monthly Film Bulletin wrote: "At the touch of a switch, Sam Costa summons a parade of pop singers to entertain him as he reclines in his electronic push-button bed. Blaring and vulgarly over-decorated musical fantasia strung together by a moronic commentary from Sam Costa; plotless, and altogether charmless, though pop fans doubtless won't mind."

Boxoffice wrote: "As an exercise in the latest international 'sound' so important to the young-adult crowd of both America and Britain, this potpourri of attractions, both famed and near-famed on both sides of the ocean, should prove an intriguing booking, particularly for weekends. It has the 'known' presence of Peter and Gordon, Freddie and the Dreamers, The Bachelors, Freddy Cannon, Millie Small, and The Chiffons, among others, and manages to stir quite a 'sound' against tremendously varied backgrounds and settings. It's as good as anything in this particular genre that's come down the pike in recent years, and, with the aid and assistance of your local disk jockeys, do [sic] reasonably well."
