= I'm the One (Gerry and the Pacemakers song) =

1964 single by Gerry and the Pacemakers

- Cover of the EP

Single by Gerry and the Pacemakers
- B-side: "You've Got What I Like"
- Released: 10 January 1964
- Recorded: 9 December 1963
- Studio: EMI Studios, London
- Genre: Merseybeat
- Length: 2:18
- Label: Columbia
- Songwriter(s): Gerry Marsden
- Producer(s): George Martin

Gerry and the Pacemakers singles chronology
"You'll Never Walk Alone" (1963)	"I'm the One" (1964)	"Don't Let the Sun Catch You Crying" (1964)

"I'm the One" is a song by Liverpudlian band Gerry and the Pacemakers, released as a single in January 1964. It was a top-ten hit in the UK and also charted in the US.

== Release ==
In 1963, Gerry and the Pacemakers became the first group to top the UK charts with their first three singles. For their fourth single, they decided to release a song penned by lead singer Gerry Marsden. However, it didn't manage to continue their chart-topping streak, as on all the major UK charts, it was held off the top by another Liverpudlian group, the Searchers with "Needles and Pins". Whilst Gerry and the Pacemakers would only go on to achieve another two top-ten hits in the UK ("Don't Let the Sun Catch You Crying" and "Ferry Cross the Mersey"), they did enjoy some success in North America as part of the British Invasion; although, in the US "I'm the One" did not perform particularly well, failing to make the Cash Box Top 100 and only peaking at number 82 on the Billboard Hot 100.

"I'm the One" wasn't released on an album in the UK, but was included on Don't Let the Sun Catch You Crying in the US. In March 1964, an EP entitled I'm the One was released in the UK featuring the title track, the single's B-side "You've Got What I Like", and two tracks from the album How Do You Like It?, "You Can't Fool Me" and "Don't You Ever". The EP peaked at number 11 on the Record Retailer EP chart.

== Charts ==
Chart (1964)	Peak position
Australia (Kent Music Report)	14
Canada (Toronto CHUM)	1
Canada (Vancouver CFUN)	7
Ireland (IRMA)	3
New Zealand (Lever Hit Parade)	5
Sweden (Kvällstoppen)	15
Sweden (Tio i Topp)	9
UK Disc Top 30	2
UK Melody Maker Top 50	2
UK New Musical Express Top 30	2
UK Record Retailer Top 50	2
US Billboard Hot 100	82
