= Norman Chapman =

English musician (1937–1995)

Background information
- Born: 31 December 1937
- Died: July 1995 (aged 57)
- Genres: Rock; rock and roll
- Occupations: Musician
- Instruments: Drums
- Years active: 1960
- Formerly of: The Beatles

Norman Chapman (31 December 1937– July 1995) was an English drummer who played with the Beatles.

After Tommy Moore left the group in June 1960, Chapman joined the Silver Beatles. However, Chapman only played three shows with the group in June 1960 before he left due to being called up for national service. He was replaced in the group by Pete Best. After finishing his time in the national service he played with several local bands, including Ernie Mack and the Saturated Seven.

Chapman died of cancer in July 1995 at the age of 57.
