= You'll Never Walk Alone =

1945 song from the musical Carousel

- Cover of the 1945 sheet music of "You'll Never Walk Alone"

Song
- Published: 1945
- Genre: Show tune; operatic pop
- Composer: Richard Rodgers
- Lyricist: Oscar Hammerstein II

"You'll Never Walk Alone", also known by its initials YNWA, is a show tune from the 1945 Rodgers and Hammerstein musical Carousel. In the second act of the musical, Nettie Fowler, the cousin of the protagonist Julie Jordan, sings "You'll Never Walk Alone" to comfort and encourage Julie when her husband, Billy Bigelow, the male lead, stabs himself with a knife whilst trying to run away after attempting a robbery with his mate Jigger and dies in her arms. The song is reprised as an epilogue in the final scene to encourage a graduation class of which Louise Bigelow (Billy and Julie's daughter) is a member as the Starkeeper is about to give them a graduation sermon. The now invisible Billy, who has been granted the chance to return to Earth for one day in order to redeem himself, watches the ceremony and at the end of the Starkeeper's homily is able to silently motivate Louise and Julie to join in with the song as the whole congregation unite in singing along with them urged on by the Starkeeper as he ascends to paradise.

The song is also sung at association football clubs around the world, where it is performed by a massed chorus of supporters on match day; this tradition developed at Liverpool F.C. after the UK chart-topping success of the 1963 single of the song by the local Liverpool group Gerry and the Pacemakers. In 2016, over 50 years after "You'll Never Walk Alone" was first sung on the Kop at Anfield, the governing body of the sport FIFA called it "one of the game's most beloved anthems". In some areas of the UK and Europe, "You'll Never Walk Alone" became the anthem of support for medical staff, first responders, and those in quarantine during the COVID-19 pandemic in 2020. The composition is sometimes treated by performers as a religious song, such as with the 1967 version by Elvis Presley, which was featured on his album You'll Never Walk Alone and several of his gospel albums. In June 2026, CBS News included the song in its list of the 250 essential American songs of the past 250 years.

== Background ==
Christine Johnson, who created the role of Nettie Fowler, introduced the song in the original Broadway production. Later in the show Jan Clayton, as Julie Jordan, reprised it, with the entire cast joining in.

In the 1956 film adaptation, the song was introduced by Claramae Turner as Nettie, also the weeping Julie Jordan (Shirley Jones) tries to sing it but can't; the song is reprised by Julie with the entire cast as the end.

== Gerry and the Pacemakers version ==
"You'll Never Walk Alone"
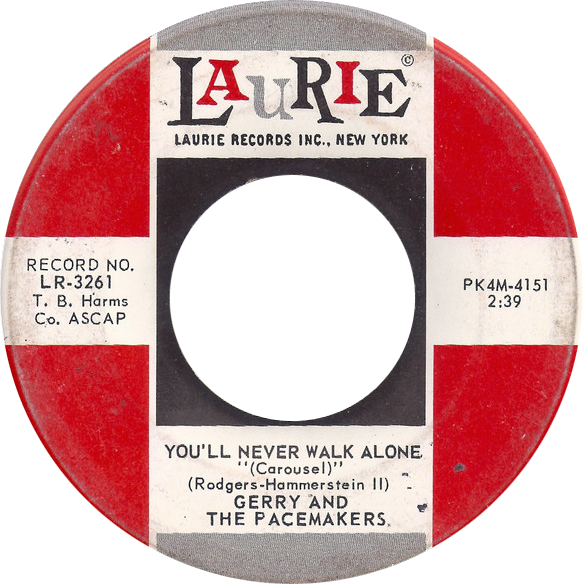
- 1964 US single of the Gerry and the Pacemakers recording

Single by Gerry and the Pacemakers

from the album How Do You Like It?
- B-side: "It's All Right"
- Released: October 1963
- Recorded: July 2, 1963
- Studio: EMI Studios, London
- Genre: Merseybeat; orchestral pop
- Length: 2:40
- Label: Columbia (EMI) (UK), Laurie (US)
- Composer: Richard Rodgers
- Lyricist: Oscar Hammerstein II
- Producer: George Martin

Gerry and the Pacemakers singles chronology
"I Like It" (1963)	"You'll Never Walk Alone" (1963)	"I'm the One" (1964)

Music video
- "You'll Never Walk Alone" on YouTube

In the UK, the song's most successful cover was released in 1963 by the Liverpudlian Merseybeat group Gerry and the Pacemakers, peaking at number one on the UK Singles Chart for four consecutive weeks. The band's version also reached the top of the charts in Australia, New Zealand and on the Irish Singles Chart.

=== Liverpool F.C. ===
After becoming a chart hit, the song gained popularity among Liverpool F.C. fans, and quickly became the football anthem of the club, which adopted "You'll Never Walk Alone" as its official motto on its coat of arms. The song is sung by its supporters before the start of each home game at Anfield with the Gerry and the Pacemakers version being played over the public address system. In October 2013, the 50th anniversary of the song being sung on the Kop, Simon Hart of The Independent wrote,

Five decades on, the pre-match, scarfs-raised, sing-it-loud ritual is as much a part of Liverpool's fabric as their red shirts, its words written in wrought iron on the gates of their stadium.

Gerry Marsden, lead vocalist of Gerry and the Pacemakers and lifelong Liverpool supporter, recalls the first time it was sung at Anfield: "I was at the match and I heard them all singing it and thought, 'Bloody hell, they're singing my song – fantastic.'"

According to former Liverpool defender Tommy Smith, Gerry Marsden presented manager Bill Shankly with a recording of his forthcoming single during a pre-season coach trip in the summer of 1963. "Shanks was in awe of what he heard. ... Football writers from the local newspapers were travelling with our party and, thirsty for a story of any kind between games, filed copy back to their editors to the effect that we had adopted Gerry Marsden's forthcoming single as the club song." In 1964, the Liverpool squad, who were in New York on a club tour having won the 1963–64 league title, were invited to perform 'YNWA' with the band on The Ed Sullivan Show, with Marsden stating, "Bill came up to me. He said, 'Gerry my son, I have given you a football team and you have given us a song'."

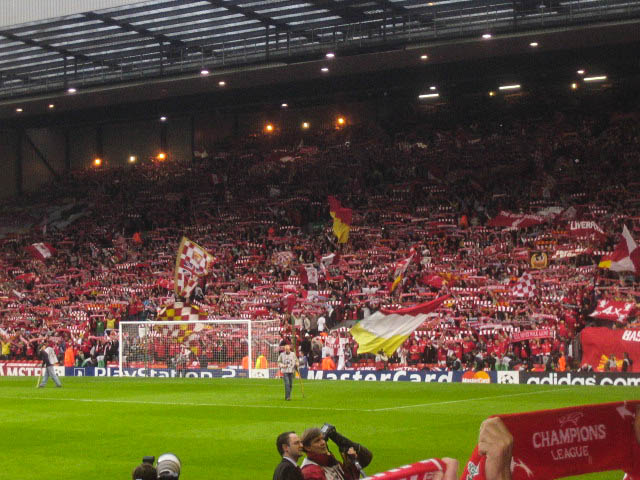
Liverpool supporters on the Kop prior to a game with scarves raised while singing "You'll Never Walk Alone"

Shankly picked the song as his eighth and final selection for the BBC's Desert Island Discs on the eve of the 1965 FA Cup final. As Liverpool fans sang "You'll Never Walk Alone" at Wembley during the 1965 FA Cup Final win over Leeds, commentator Kenneth Wolstenholme referred to it as "Liverpool's signature tune". Marsden told BBC Radio how, in the 1960s, the disc jockey at Anfield would play the top 10 commercial records in descending order, with the number one single played last, shortly before kickoff. Liverpool fans on the Kop would sing along, but unlike with other hit singles, once "You'll Never Walk Alone" dropped out of the top 10, instead of disregarding the song, supporters—chanting 'Where's our song?'—continued to sing it. In retirement, according to his granddaughter Karen Gill, Shankly would get out the gramophone and "put the record on and play it, so we would hear it in the house."

In 2016, the governing body of the sport FIFA stated, "With scarves raised, banners aloft and flags flying, the Kop at Anfield has long held a standard for producing some of football's great sights and sounds. This is particularly so when Liverpool supporters stand and sing one of the game's most beloved anthems, 'You’ll Never Walk Alone'."

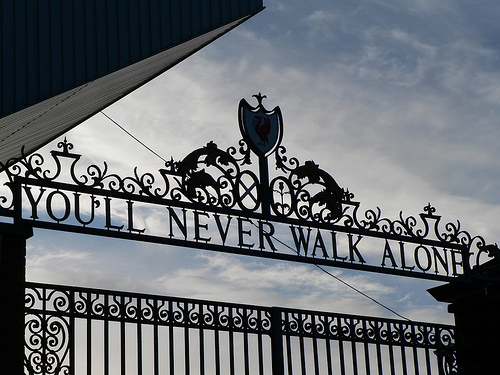
The 'Shankly Gates' entrance to Liverpool's home stadium Anfield

There's not one club in Europe with an anthem like "You'll Never Walk Alone." There's not one club in the world so united with the fans. I sat there watching the Liverpool fans and they sent shivers down my spine. A mass of 40,000 people became one force behind their team.

— Johan Cruyff following the 2005 Champions League final.

In his commentary on the memorial service following the Hillsborough disaster in 1989, Peter Jones recited the lyrics of 'YNWA', which were then sung by a cathedral choir. Aretha Franklin's recording of the song from her 1971 live album Amazing Grace was played by BBC Radio 1 DJ and Liverpool fan John Peel in his first show following the disaster. In 2019, during a Take That concert at Anfield, Gerry Marsden made a guest appearance to sing the song with Gary Barlow.

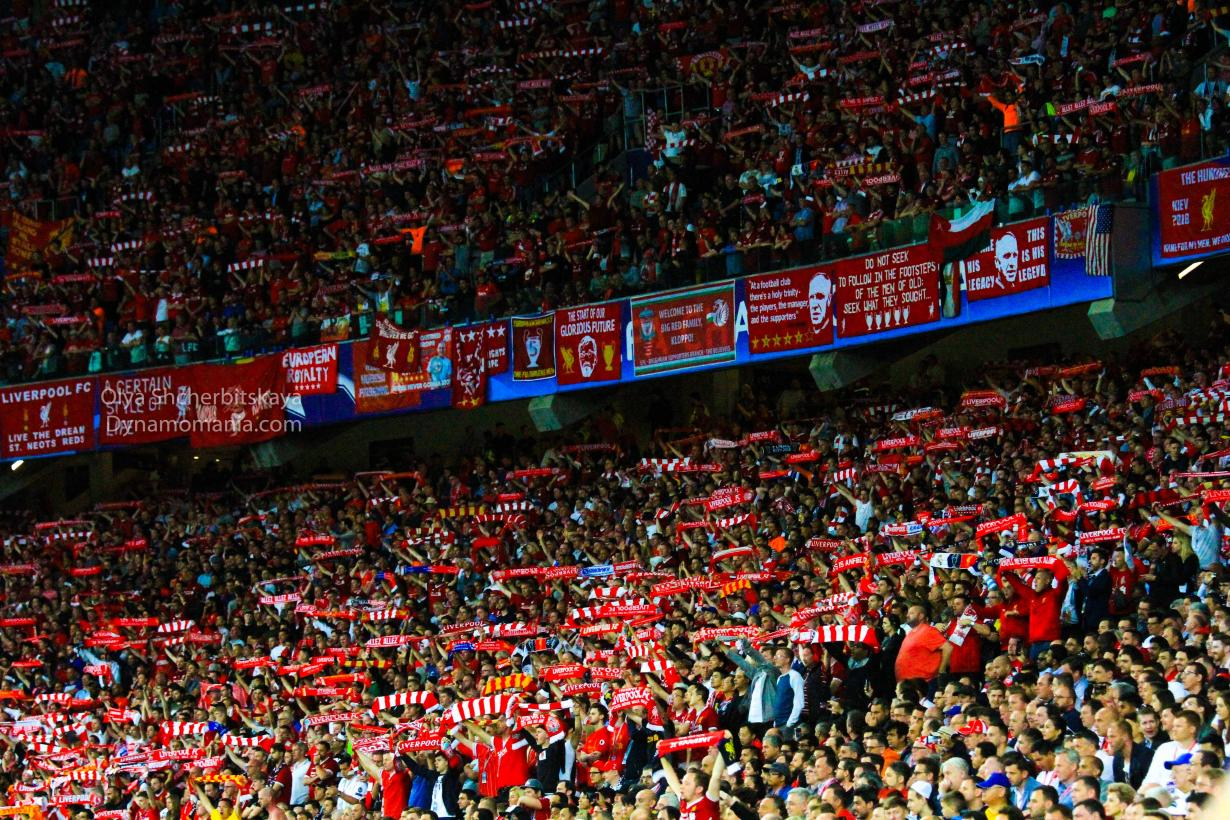
Liverpool supporters with scarves raised singing 'YNWA' at the 2018 Champions League final in Kyiv

With its message of hope, encouragement and solidarity, the club states the song is "ingrained into the DNA of Liverpool FC; belted out in triumph and sung in sorrow during the highs and lows of the last six decades", and reflecting on 60 years of 'YNWA' as the club's anthem in 2023, Liverpool manager Jürgen Klopp stated, "Simple but powerful lyrics, a real message. Some things have changed since then [the 1960s] but obviously what it means to the people has never changed."

In 1995, the Gerry and the Pacemakers version peaked at number 34 on the Dutch Single Top 100 on the week ending March 18 and number 24 on the Dutch Top 40 on the week ending April 1. It re-entered the Irish Singles Chart in 2012, peaking at number four on the week ending September 20.

=== Other teams ===
"It was subsequently adopted by Celtic fans, after a 1966 Cup Winners' Cup semi-final at Anfield, and is sung today by fans of Borussia Dortmund and several other clubs, but 'YNWA' remains enduringly and indelibly linked with Liverpool."

— FourFourTwo magazine.

The song was adopted by Scottish team Celtic after a 1966 Cup Winners' Cup semi-final against Liverpool at Anfield, and is now sung by Celtic fans prior to every home European tie, and later by Germany's Borussia Dortmund, which Liverpool went on to play in the cup final. When Celtic and Liverpool played in the quarterfinals of the 2002-03 UEFA Cup, Gerry Marsden performed the song at Celtic Park before both teams took the field and both sets of fans sang along.

The song has also been adopted by Dutch team FC Twente after it was officially given to them by the Anfield stadium speaker George Sephton during the last game in Diekman Stadion in 1998, before moving to the new Arke Stadion. Today, Twente fans sing the song before every home game. Elsewhere in the Netherlands, Feyenoord and SC Cambuur have adopted the song as well, with Feyenoord using the Lee Towers version from his 1976 album It's Raining in My Heart.

Additional football teams which now use the song include 1. FSV Mainz 05, TSV 1860 Munich, Austria's FC Admira Wacker, Belgium's Club Brugge KV, KV Mechelen and K.V. Kortrijk, Italy's Genoa CFC, Japan's FC Tokyo, Spain's CD Lugo, and Greece's ARIS. In ice hockey, the song has been adopted by German Deutsche Eishockey Liga side Krefeld Pinguine and Croatian Medveščak Zagreb.

Some years later, after witnessing a rendition of "You'll Never Walk Alone" at Anfield in 2007, the President of the Spanish Olympic Committee, Alejandro Blanco, said he felt inspired to seek lyrics to his country's wordless national anthem, the Marcha Real, ahead of Madrid's bid to host the 2016 Olympic Games.

During the 2014 Hong Kong protests, legislator Tam Yiu Chung quoted the song during a Legislative Council of Hong Kong meeting, to salute the Hong Kong Police, who had received widespread criticism for using excessive force against pro-democracy protesters. More than 2,000 Liverpool F.C. fans in Hong Kong condemned his inappropriate use of the song, comparing his support of the police action to the police actions in the 1989 Hillsborough disaster, where South Yorkshire Police were found to have distorted facts relating to the unlawful killing by negligence of 97 Liverpool supporters.

On 13 March 2016, after Borussia Dortmund's 2–0 win against 1. FSV Mainz 05 in the German Bundesliga, supporters of both teams performed the song to commemorate a Dortmund fan who died from a cardiac arrest in the stands during the game.

The song was also used by the South Sydney Rabbitohs in the final two regular season rounds of the 2026 National Rugby League season to commemorate Jai Arrow, who retired in May 2026 after being diagnosed with motor neurone disease (MND). The Rabbitohs were given special dispensation by the NRL to allow Arrow to reach 100 games for the club, where he would be on the field for one second, before coming off without it counting towards their interchange limit.

=== Weekly charts ===
Chart (1963–1965)	Peak position
Australia (Kent Music Report)	1
Canada RPM Top Singles	31
Ireland (IRMA)	1
New Zealand (Lever Hit Parade)	1
UK	1
US Billboard Hot 100	48
Chart (2012)	Peak position
Ireland (IRMA)	4

=== Year-end charts ===
Chart (1963)	Rank
Australia	16
UK	3

=== Certifications ===
Region	Certification	Certified units/sales
New Zealand (RMNZ)	Gold	15,000^{‡}
United Kingdom (BPI)	Platinum	600,000^{‡}
^{‡} Sales+streaming figures based on certification alone.

== The Crowd version ==
A special recording of the song was made in solidarity with Bradford City following the Valley Parade fire in 1985 when 56 spectators died and many more were seriously injured. The song was performed by charity supergroup the Crowd, which featured Gerry Marsden, Paul McCartney and others, and spent two weeks at number one in the UK and Ireland in June 1985.

=== Weekly charts ===
Chart (1985)	Peak position
Ireland (IRMA)	1
Netherlands (Single Top 100)	30
UK Singles (OCC)	1
UK Indie	1
West Germany (GfK)	47

=== Year-end charts ===
Chart (1985)	Peak position
Ireland (IRMA)	1
Netherlands (Single Top 100)	30
UK Singles (OCC)	1
UK Indie	1
West Germany (GfK)	47

=== Certifications ===
Region	Certification	Certified units/sales
United Kingdom (BPI)	Gold	500,000^{^}
^{^} Shipments figures based on certification alone.

== Marcus Mumford version ==
"You'll Never Walk Alone"

Single by Marcus Mumford
- Released: March 20, 2020
- Length: 2:14
- Label: Glassnote

Marcus Mumford singles chronology
"You'll Never Walk Alone" (2020)	"Lay Your Head on Me" (2020)

Marcus Mumford, lead singer of the British folk rock band Mumford & Sons, released a cover version of "You'll Never Walk Alone" as a single on March 20, 2020, through Glassnote Records. Mumford's version was originally recorded for the Apple TV+ sports comedy-drama Ted Lasso; it appears in the first-season finale, "The Hope That Kills You" in 2020. Proceeds from the single release were donated to the Grenfell Foundation and War Child UK.

Chart (2020)	Peak position
Belgium (Ultratip Bubbling Under Flanders)	30
Scottish Singles Sales (Official Charts)	72
UK Singles Downloads (Official Charts)	72

== Michael Ball and Captain Tom Moore version ==
"You'll Never Walk Alone"

Single by Michael Ball, Captain Tom Moore and The NHS Voices of Care Choir
- Released: April 17, 2020
- Length: 4:10
- Label: Decca

Michael Ball singles chronology
"Bring Me Sunshine" (2017)	"You'll Never Walk Alone" (2020)	"Be The One" (2021)

In April 2020, to mark 99-year old Captain Tom Moore completing the first phase of his fundraising walk during the COVID-19 pandemic, English actor, singer and broadcaster, Michael Ball sang "You'll Never Walk Alone" for him live on BBC Breakfast. Ball said: "It's an extraordinary achievement. I've been trying to think of a song which encapsulates your achievement and what you have done for us." Within 24 hours, the performance was recorded, and made into a digital single featuring the NHS Voices of Care Choir, and Moore's spoken words. It was released by Decca Records on April 17, with all proceeds going to NHS Charities Together. The duo appeared on Zoe Ball's Radio 2 show, where they both performed the song.

On April 19, 2020, the song went straight to number one in the United Kingdom's "The EE Official Big Top 40" chart, selling almost 36,000 copies in its first 48 hours. On April 21, 2020, the song was the "biggest trending song" as measured by the Official Charts Company. On April 24, 2020, the song entered the UK Singles Chart at number one, with combined chart sales of 82,000 making it the fastest-selling single of 2020 so far and making Moore – six days short of his one hundredth birthday – the oldest person to achieve that position and meaning that he was at number one on his 100th birthday, beating the previous record-holder Tom Jones, who was 68 years old when a Comic Relief rendition of "Islands in the Stream" reached number one in 2009.

=== Weekly charts ===
Chart (2020)	Peak position
Scotland (Official Charts Company)	1
UK Singles (Official Charts)	1

== Other versions ==
- Pink Floyd's 1971 song "Fearless" features Liverpool fans singing excerpts from "You'll Never Walk Alone", which is superimposed over the music near the beginning and at the end of the song.
- The American singer Josh Groban covered the song on his 2015 seventh studio album Stages. He also performed the song at the 69th Tony Awards on June 7, 2015 during the In Memoriam segment.

=== Weekly charts ===
Patti LaBelle & the Bluebells
Chart (1963–1964)	Peak position
US Billboard Hot 100	34

The Lettermen
Chart (1965)	Peak position
Canada RPM Adult Contemporary	3

Elvis Presley
Chart (1968)	Peak position
Canada RPM Top Singles	55
UK Singles (OCC)	44
US Billboard Hot 100	90

The Brooklyn Bridge
Chart (1969)	Peak position
US Billboard Hot 100	51
US Cash Box Top 100	37

Blue Haze
Chart (1973)	Peak position
Canada RPM Adult Contemporary	21
US Cash Box Top 100	93
