= I Like It (Gerry and the Pacemakers song) =

Single by Gerry and the Pacemakers
- B-side: "It's Happened to Me"
- Released: May 1963
- Recorded: 24 April 1963
- Studio: EMI Studios, London
- Genre: Merseybeat
- Length: 2:15
- Label: Columbia (EMI); Laurie 3196 (US)
- Songwriter: Mitch Murray
- Producer: George Martin

Gerry and the Pacemakers singles chronology
"How Do You Do It?" (1963)	"I Like It" (1963)	"You'll Never Walk Alone" (1963)

"I Like It" is the second single by Liverpudlian band Gerry and the Pacemakers. Like Gerry Marsden's first number one "How Do You Do It", it was written by Mitch Murray. The song reached number one in the UK Singles Chart on 20 June 1963, where it stayed for four weeks. It reached No. 17 in the American charts in 1964.

Cash Box described it as "a happy-go-lucky jump'er that Gerry [Marsden] solo vocals in ear-arresting style."
