= Ferry Cross the Mersey =

1964 single by Gerry and the Pacemakers

Single by Gerry and the Pacemakers

from the album Ferry Cross the Mersey
- B-side: "You, You, You" (UK); "Pretend" (US)
- Released: December 1964
- Recorded: 27 May 1964 ("You, You, You": 28 September)
- Studio: EMI Studios, London
- Genre: Merseybeat, pop
- Length: 2:24
- Label: Columbia (UK); Laurie 3284 (USA); Capitol 72216 (Canada)
- Songwriter: Gerry Marsden
- Producer: George Martin

Gerry and the Pacemakers singles chronology
"It's Gonna Be Alright" (1964)	"Ferry Cross the Mersey" (1964)	"I'll Be There" (1965)

"Ferry Cross the Mersey" is a song written by Gerry Marsden. It was first recorded by his band Gerry and the Pacemakers and released in late 1964 in the UK and in 1965 in the United States. It was a hit on both sides of the Atlantic, reaching number six in the United States and number eight in the UK. The song is from the film of the same name and was released on its soundtrack album. In the mid-1990s, a musical theatre production, also titled Ferry Cross the Mersey, related Gerry Marsden's Merseybeat days; it premiered in Liverpool and played in the UK, Australia, and Canada.

== Song title and lyrics ==
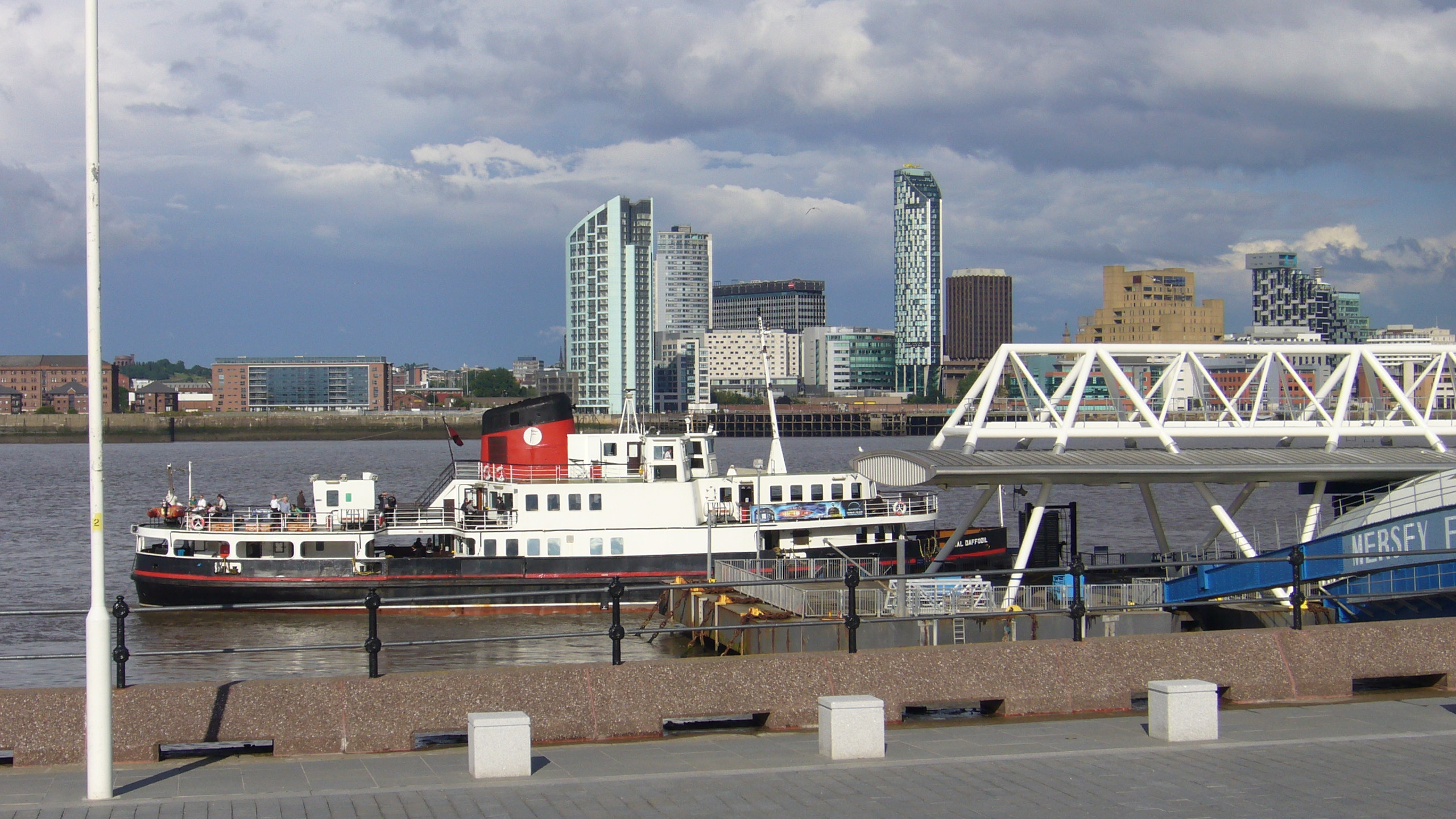
MV Royal Daffodil at Seacombe Pier

"Mersey" refers to the River Mersey in northwest England, which flows into the Irish Sea at Liverpool. The Mersey Ferry runs between Liverpool and Birkenhead and Seacombe on the Wirral Peninsula.

Cash Box described the song as "a touching, soft cha cha beat sentimental opus that Gerry vocals with much sincerity."

== Chart performance ==
"Ferry Cross the Mersey" became a Top 10 hit in the UK and also in the U.S., where it was a bigger hit. It did best in Chicago, where it reached number one on WLS-AM.

=== Weekly charts ===
Chart (1964–1965)	Peak position
Sweden (Kvällstoppen)	12
Sweden (Tio i Topp)	7
UK Singles Chart	8
US Billboard Hot 100	6
US Cash Box Top 100	4

=== Year-end charts ===
Chart (1965)	Rank
UK	89
US Billboard Hot 100	43
US Cash Box	82

== Charity record for The Hillsborough Disaster Fund ==
"Ferry 'Cross the Mersey"

Single by the Christians, Holly Johnson, Paul McCartney, Gerry Marsden and Stock Aitken Waterman
- B-side: "Abide with Me" by Liverpool Metropolitan Cathedral Choir
- Released: 8 May 1989
- Length: 3:58
- Label: PWL
- Songwriter: Gerry Marsden
- Producer: Stock Aitken Waterman

In May 1989, a charity version of "Ferry Cross the Mersey" was released in aid of those affected by the Hillsborough disaster, which had, at the time, claimed the lives of 95 Liverpool fans the previous month. The song was recorded by Liverpool artists the Christians, Holly Johnson, Paul McCartney and Gerry Marsden, with producers Stock Aitken Waterman also credited. The single held the number-one spot in the UK chart for three weeks and the Irish chart for two weeks.

=== Charts ===
==== Weekly charts ====
Chart (1989)	Peak position
Australia (ARIA)	45
Austria (Ö3 Austria Top 40)	15
Belgium (Ultratop 50 Flanders)	28
Europe (Eurochart Hot 100)	5
Ireland (IRMA)	1
Netherlands (Dutch Top 40)	20
Netherlands (Single Top 100)	21
Norway (VG-lista)	4
Switzerland (Schweizer Hitparade)	11
UK Singles (Official Charts)	1
West Germany (GfK)	4

==== Year-end charts ====
Chart (1989)	Position
Europe (Eurochart Hot 100)	64
UK Singles (OCC)	19
West Germany (Media Control)	50

== Other cover versions ==
- Frankie Goes to Hollywood recorded a cover of "Ferry Cross the Mersey" for the B-side of the 12-inch single "Relax", released in October 1983. It was subsequently included on their later compilations Bang!... The Greatest Hits of Frankie Goes to Hollywood (1993) and Maximum Joy (2000), as well as certain copies of their debut album Welcome to the Pleasuredome.
- Canadian popular musician Burton Cummings (of The Guess Who) recorded a solo version on his 1997 live album Up Close and Alone.
- In 2003, Pat Metheny included an instrumental cover of the song on his acoustic album One Quiet Night.
- The German-British punk rock band Die Toten Hosen released a cover version in 2020 on their album "Learning English Lesson 3 - Mersey Beat!". The album peaked at position 2 in the German album chart.
- Australian band The Jazz Kings included a cover version on their 2024 album Blue Jazz. It was arranged and sung by their pianist Jose McLaughlin, who was a former member of Gerry and the Pacemakers. The track went to No.1 on the Australian Independent Charts.
