= How Do You Do It? =

- EP cover

Single by Gerry and the Pacemakers
- B-side: "Away from You"
- Released: 1 March 1963
- Recorded: 22 January 1963
- Studio: EMI, London
- Genre: Merseybeat
- Length: 1:59
- Label: Columbia DB4987 (EMI); Laurie 3261 (US)
- Songwriter: Mitch Murray
- Producer: George Martin

Gerry and the Pacemakers singles chronology
"How Do You Do It?" (1963)	"I Like It" (1963)

"How Do You Do It?" is a song, written by Mitch Murray. It was recorded by Liverpudlian band Gerry and the Pacemakers, and became their debut single. This reached number one in the UK Singles Chart on 11 April 1963, where it stayed for three weeks.

== History ==
The song’s author, Mitch Murray, offered it to Adam Faith and to Brian Poole but was turned down. George Martin of EMI, who felt the song had enormous hit potential, decided to pick it up for the new group he was producing, the Beatles, as the A-side of their first single. The Beatles recorded the song on 4 September 1962 with Ringo Starr on drums. The group was initially opposed to recording it, feeling that it did not fit their sound, but worked out changes from Murray's demo-disc version, which included a new introduction, vocal harmony, an instrumental interlude, small lyric changes and removal of the half-step modulation for the last verse.

Although Murray disliked their changes, the decision not to release the Beatles' version was primarily a business one, because EMI publisher Ardmore & Beechwood were interested in publishing Lennon–McCartney material, while Murray did not want his song relegated to the B-side. In fact, George Martin came very close to issuing "How Do You Do It?" as the Beatles' first single before settling instead on "Love Me Do", recorded during the same sessions. Martin commented later: "I looked very hard at 'How Do You Do It?', but in the end I went with 'Love Me Do', it was quite a good record." McCartney would remark: "We knew that the peer pressure back in Liverpool would not allow us to do 'How Do You Do It'."

== The Beatles' cover ==
"How Do You Do It?"

Song by the Beatles

from the album Anthology 1
- Released: 20 November 1995
- Recorded: 4 September 1962
- Studio: EMI, London
- Genre: Merseybeat
- Length: 1:57
- Songwriter: Mitch Murray
- Producer: George Martin

The Beatles' version of "How Do You Do It?" was unissued for over 30 years, finally being released in November 1995 on the retrospective Anthology 1.

While the Beatles' recording remained in the vaults, Martin still had faith in the song's appeal. Consequently he had another new client, Gerry and the Pacemakers, record "How Do You Do It?" as their debut single in early 1963. That version of "How Do You Do It?", produced by Martin, became a number-one hit in the UK until it was supplanted by "From Me to You" (the Beatles' third single). It was the title song of a 7-inch EP that also featured "Away from You", "I Like It" and "It's Happened to Me" (Columbia SEG8257, released July 1963).

== Chart performance ==
Gerry and the Pacemakers' version of "How Do You Do It?" was initially issued in the US and Canada in the spring of 1963, but made no impact on the charts. After the group had issued several chart singles in North America, the track was reissued in the summer of 1964. "How Do You Do It?" entered the US charts on 5 July 1964, eventually reaching number nine; it did even better in Canada, peaking at number six. Billboard described the song as a "top-rated teen ballad" with a "great beat for dancing". Cash Box described it as a "bright jumper...that's sure to get chart action right off the bat" and also as "a charming, teen-angled stomp-atwist'er...that the outfit knocks out in very commercial solo vocal and combo instrumental manner."

In their native UK, the single reached number one in the charts, staying there for three weeks in total.
