= Gerry Marsden =

English singer-songwriter and musician (1942–2021)

Gerry Marsden MBE
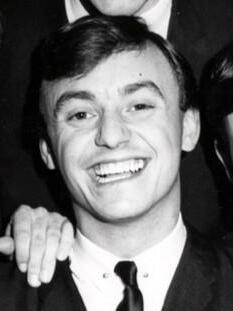
- Marsden in 1964

Background information
- Born: Gerard Marsden; 24 September 1942; Toxteth, Liverpool, England
- Died: 3 January 2021 (aged 78) Arrowe Park, Merseyside, England
- Genres: Merseybeat; pop; rock and roll
- Occupations: Singer-songwriter, musician, television personality
- Instruments: Vocals, guitar
- Years active: 1959–2020
- Labels: CBS (UK); NEMS; DJM
- Website: www.gerryandthepacemakers.co.uk

Gerard Marsden MBE (24 September 1942 – 3 January 2021) was an English singer-songwriter, musician and television personality, best known for being leader of the Merseybeat band Gerry and the Pacemakers. He was the younger brother of fellow band member Freddie Marsden.

Gerry and the Pacemakers had the distinction of being the first act to have their first three recordings go to number 1 in the UK singles chart. Although they never had a number 1 in the US, they were the second-most successful group from Liverpool, after the Beatles, to have hits on the Billboard pop charts. Their 1963 UK chart-topper "You'll Never Walk Alone" became the anthem of Liverpool F.C., Marsden's lifelong club, and in 1964 his group along with the team performed it on The Ed Sullivan Show. The group's 1965 musical film Ferry Cross the Mersey was co-written by Tony Warren.

== Early life ==
Marsden was born at 8 Menzies Street, Toxteth, Liverpool, to Frederick Marsden and Mary McAlindin. His interest in music began at an early age. He remembered standing on top of an air-raid shelter singing "Ragtime Cowboy Joe", and getting a great reception from onlookers.

== Career ==
Gerry and the Pacemakers formed in 1959. They were the second group signed by Brian Epstein, the first being the Beatles, and remained among his favourite artists. Their first single was 1963's "How Do You Do It?", recommended by George Martin after it was initially given to the Beatles. This was the first number one hit for the Pacemakers. It was recorded at Abbey Road Studios and was released on EMI's Columbia label.

The group's second number one was "I Like It", followed by "You'll Never Walk Alone", both released later in 1963. The group's other singles included "It's Gonna Be Alright", "I'm the One", "Don't Let the Sun Catch You Crying", and "Ferry Cross the Mersey", all released in 1964. A musical film Ferry Cross the Mersey, considered to be their version of the Beatles' A Hard Day's Night, was co-written by Coronation Street creator and writer Tony Warren, and was released in 1965.

The Pacemakers disbanded in October 1966. After leaving the group, Marsden maintained a low-key career on television, including a regular slot on children's television in The Sooty Show. He also starred in the West End musical Charlie Girl alongside Derek Nimmo and Anna Neagle, replacing another pop singer, Joe Brown. A new song, "Liverpool", was added to the score to tie in with Marsden's Liverpool accent.

In 1983, Marsden and the Pacemakers' "Ferry Cross the Mersey" was covered by another band from Liverpool, Frankie Goes to Hollywood, in a new arrangement as the B-side of their song "Relax"; at least partly due to this, Marsden began receiving significant royalties (with his total yearly publishing royalties at the time being equivalent to $250,000 USD). By that time, Marsden also owned a radio station in Liverpool and owned real estate in England and Spain.

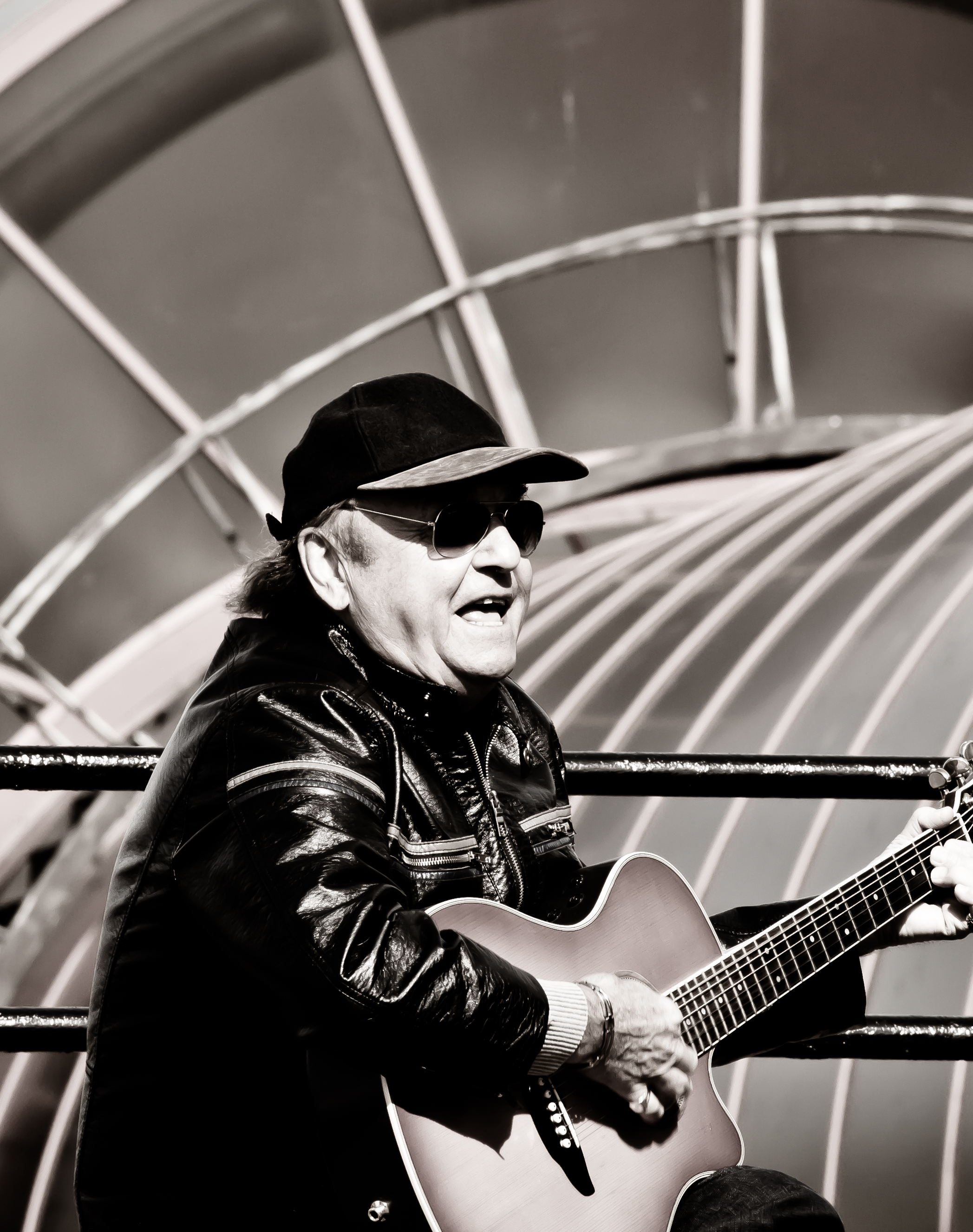
Marsden performing in 2011

Marsden returned to #1 in the charts twice during the 1980s with re-recordings of two of his old hits, with all profits going to charity. In 1985 after the Bradford Football Club stadium tragedy in which 56 were killed, he formed a group called the Crowd, which included other musicians, singers, and radio disc jockeys, to produce a new version of "You'll Never Walk Alone". On 18 April 1989, three days after the Hillsborough disaster in which 97 Liverpool F.C. fans died, he joined forces with Paul McCartney, the Christians, Holly Johnson, and his production trio Stock, Aitken & Waterman on a new version of "Ferry Cross the Mersey".

In 1993 Marsden published his autobiography, I'll Never Walk Alone, co-written with former Melody Maker editor Ray Coleman. In 1990, he recorded the song "Red White and Blue", with The England Supporters Club, that also appears on the Euro 96 album England's Glory.

In 2012, Marsden and Paul McCartney were among another group of musicians that recorded a cover of "He Ain't Heavy, He's My Brother" for charity; the single was credited to the Justice Collective. In 2020, during the COVID-19 pandemic, he released a version of "You'll Never Walk Alone" in tribute to the National Health Service.

== Personal life and death ==
In 1965, Marsden married Pauline Behan, and they had two daughters, Yvette and Victoria. It was Yvette who introduced her father to Frankie Goes To Hollywood's 1983 cover of "Ferry Cross the Mersey" after hearing it being played in a discotheque. Marsden had an older brother, Freddie, who co-founded and played drums in the Pacemakers and who died in 2006.

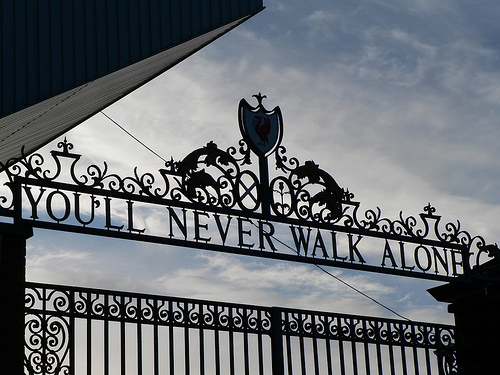
Marsden's hit song, the anthem of Liverpool F.C., his lifelong club, etched on the 'Shankly Gates' outside Anfield

A lifelong Liverpool F.C. supporter, Marsden's rendition of "You'll Never Walk Alone" was adopted by the Kop upon its release in October 1963 and became the club's anthem. On his reaction to the first time it was sung at Anfield, Marsden recalls:

I was at the match and I heard them all singing it and thought, 'Bloody hell, they're singing my song – fantastic.'

Prior to the release of "YNWA", Marsden had presented the Liverpool manager Bill Shankly with a recording of it during a pre-season coach trip in the summer of 1963, with the club's defender Tommy Smith stating, "Shanks was in awe of what he heard". In 1964, Marsden and his group along with the Liverpool squad performed the track on The Ed Sullivan Show, with Marsden stating, "Bill came up to me. He said, 'Gerry my son, I have given you a football team and you have given us a song'."

In September 2003, Marsden had triple bypass heart surgery at Broad Green Hospital in Liverpool. He had a second heart operation in 2016, and announced his retirement in November 2018, although he appeared with Take That at their concert at Anfield in June 2019.

Marsden died on 3 January 2021 at Arrowe Park Hospital in Merseyside, after being diagnosed with a blood infection in his heart. He was 78 years old. Sir Paul McCartney led the tributes to his old friend, ending his message with "See ya, Gerry. I'll always remember you with a smile", while Liverpool F.C. released a statement saying the club was "deeply saddened" by his passing.

== Awards and honours ==
In 2003, for his services supporting the victims of the Hillsborough disaster, Marsden was made an MBE. In 2009, he was awarded the Freedom of the City by Liverpool. In 2010, Marsden was awarded an Honorary Fellowship from Liverpool John Moores University.

== Solo discography ==
=== Albums ===
- A Tribute to Lennon & McCartney (Dominion, 1995)
- One 2 One (Pulse Records, 1999)
- Much Missed Man: Tribute to John Lennon (Ozit, 2001)
- My Home Town (Angel Air, 2021)

=== Singles ===
- Please Let Them Be / I'm Not Blue (CBS, March 1967)
- Gilbert Green / What Makes Me Love You (CBS, August 1967)
- Liverpool / Charlie Girl (released as Gerry Marsden & Derek Nimmo, CBS, April 1968)
- In the Year of April / Every Day (NEMS, November 1968)
- Every Little Minute / In Days of Old (NEMS, May 1969)
- I've Got My Ukulele / What a Day (Decca, May 1971)
- Amo Credo / Come Break Bread (Phoenix UK, April 1972)
- They Don't Make Days Like That Any More / Can't You Hear the Song? (DJM, August 1974)
- Your Song / Days I Spent with You (DJM, April 1975)
- My Home Town / Lovely Lady (DJM, September 1976)
- You'll Never Walk Alone / Messages (with the Crowd, (Spartan Records, 1985)
- Ferry Cross the Mersey / Abide with Me (with Paul McCartney, the Christians, Holly Johnson and Stock Aitken Waterman, PWE, 1989)
- Red, White and Blue / Red, White and Blue (Backing Track) (Gerry Marsden and the England Supporters Club, Westmoor Music, 1990)
- As Time Stood Still (The Sun: Gulf Aid, GULF, 1991)
- He Ain't Heavy, He's My Brother (as part of the Justice Collective, Metropolis, 2012)
