= Gerry and the Pacemakers =

English band

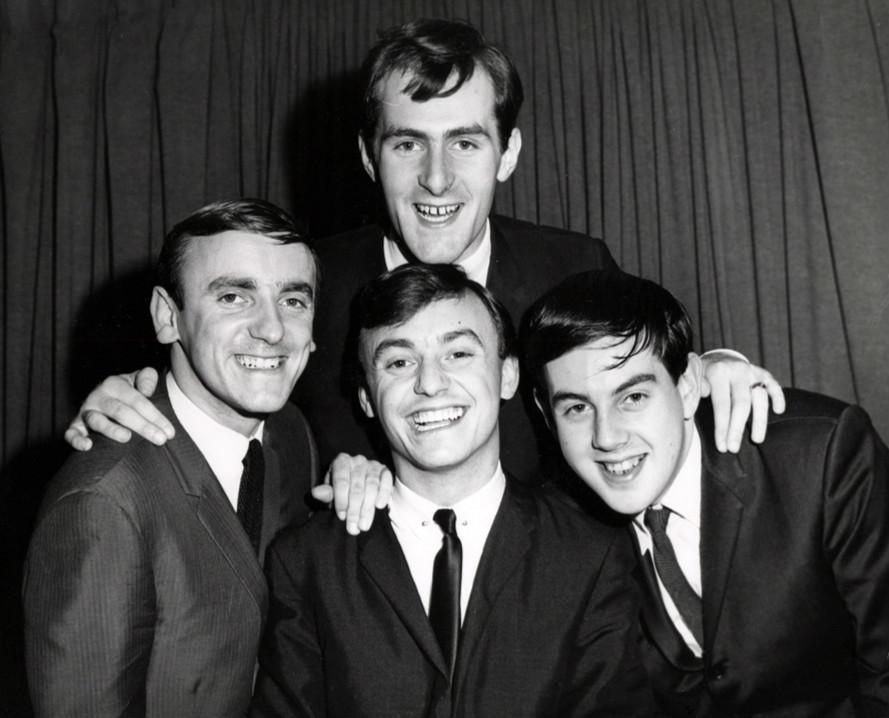
- The band in 1964: Les Maguire (top), Freddie Marsden, Gerry Marsden, Les Chadwick

Background information
- Also known as: Gerry Marsden and the Mars Bars (1956–1959); Gerry's Pacemakers (2021–present)
- Origin: Liverpool, England
- Genres: Merseybeat; pop; rock and roll
- Years active: 1956–1966; 1972–2018; 2021–present (as Gerry's Pacemakers)
- Labels: Columbia (EMI) (UK); Laurie (US); United Artists (US); Capitol (Canada); Parlophone (UK)
- Members: Gerry's Pacemakers: Darren Tingey; Jimmy Stanley; Dean Hilborne; John Meaney
- Past members: Gerry Marsden; Freddie Marsden; Arthur "Mack" McMahon; Les Chadwick; Faron Ruffley; Les Maguire; Jose McLaughlin; Billy Kinsley; Pete Clarke; Tony Young; Dave Burgess; Neil Rhodes; Alan Greenwood; Keff McCulloch; Tracey McCulloch; Andy Taylor; Rick Medlock

Gerry and the Pacemakers were an English beat group prominent in the 1960s Merseybeat scene. In common with the Beatles, they came from Liverpool, were managed by Brian Epstein and produced by George Martin. Their early successes helped make popular the Merseybeat sound and launch the wider British beat boom of the mid-1960s.

They were the first act to have all of their first three singles reach No. 1 on the UK Singles Chart: "How Do You Do It?", "I Like It" and "You'll Never Walk Alone", the latter from the musical Carousel. This record was not equalled for 20 years, until the mid-1980s success of fellow Liverpool band Frankie Goes to Hollywood. Another of their most famous songs is "Ferry Cross the Mersey", which refers to the River Mersey, which flows past Liverpool, and was the title song for the film of the same name, which the group starred in. The group also enjoyed some success in North America as part of the British Invasion, with seven of their singles reaching the US Top 40, their biggest hit there being "Don't Let the Sun Catch You Crying", which reached No. 4 on the Billboard Hot 100.

The group broke up in 1966, though singer/guitarist/band leader Gerry Marsden would reform the group on and off through the subsequent years, until his retirement in 2018. Since his death in 2021 his bandmates, from his final lineup of the band, have returned to touring as Gerry's Pacemakers, as Marsden requested before he retired.

== History ==
Marsden formed the group in 1956 with his brother Fred, Les Chadwick, and Arthur McMahon. At the time, Gerry had been working for British Rail as a deliveryman. They rivalled the Beatles early in their career, playing in the same areas of Liverpool. McMahon (known as Arthur Mack) was replaced on piano by Les Maguire around 1961. The group's original name was Gerry Marsden and the Mars Bars, but they were forced to change this when the Mars Company, producers of the chocolate Mars bar, complained.

Brian Epstein signed them to Columbia Records (a sister label to the Beatles' label Parlophone under EMI). They began recording in January 1963 with "How Do You Do It?", a song written by Mitch Murray. The song was produced by George Martin and became a number one hit in the UK, the first by an Epstein-managed Liverpool group to achieve this on all charts. "How Do You Do It?" was also reluctantly recorded by the Beatles (they eventually convinced Martin to let them release their song "Love Me Do" as a single instead). Both the Pacemakers' and Beatles' versions of "How Do You Do It?" were recorded at Abbey Road Studios.

Gerry Marsden was quoted as saying:

The Beatles and ourselves (The Pacemakers)—we let go, when we get on-stage. I'm not being detrimental, but in the south, I think the groups have let themselves get a bit too formal. On Merseyside, it's beat, beat, beat all the way. We go on and really have a ball.

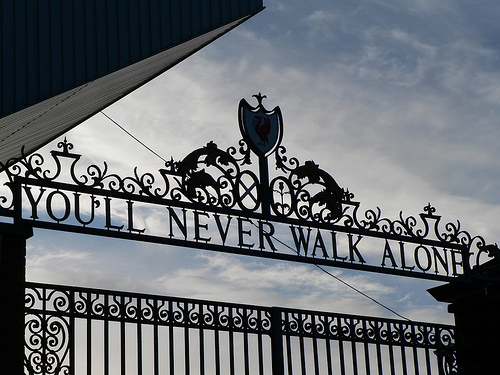
The 'Shankly Gates' entrance to Liverpool's home stadium Anfield. The anthem of Liverpool F.C., "You'll Never Walk Alone" is sung by its fans before the start of each home game, with the Gerry and the Pacemakers version played over the PA system.

Gerry and the Pacemakers' next two singles, Murray's "I Like It" and Rodgers and Hammerstein's "You'll Never Walk Alone", both also reached number one in the UK Singles Chart, the latter recorded instead of the Beatles' "Hello Little Girl". "You'll Never Walk Alone" had been a favourite of Marsden's since seeing Carousel when he was growing up. It quickly became the signature tune of Liverpool Football Club and, later, other sports teams around the world. The song remains a football anthem. The group narrowly missed a fourth consecutive number one when "I'm the One" was kept off the top spot for two weeks in February 1964 by fellow Liverpudlians The Searchers' "Needles and Pins".

Gerry and the Pacemakers had the distinction of being the first act to have their first three recordings go to number 1 in the UK charts. Although they never had a number 1 in the United States, they were the second-most successful group from Liverpool, after the Beatles, to have hits on the United States Billboard pop charts.

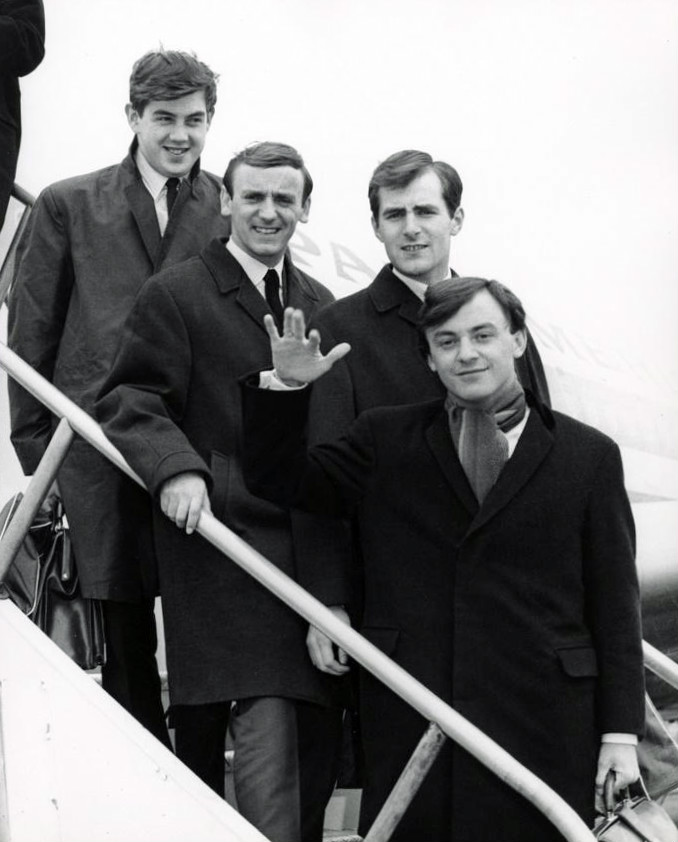
The group's New York arrival in 1964.

Despite this early success, Gerry and the Pacemakers never had another number one single in the UK. Marsden began writing most of their songs, including "I'm the One", "It's Gonna Be All Right" and "Ferry Cross the Mersey", as well as their first and biggest US hit, "Don't Let the Sun Catch You Crying", which peaked at No. 4.

The band also starred in the early 1965 film, Ferry Cross the Mersey for which Marsden wrote much of the soundtrack. The film was co-written by Coronation Street creator and writer Tony Warren and is considered to be their version of the Beatles' A Hard Day's Night.

The title song was revived in 1989 as a charity single for an appeal in response to the Hillsborough football crowd disaster, giving Marsden – in association with other Liverpool stars, including Paul McCartney, Ringo Starr and Frankie Goes to Hollywood's Holly Johnson – another British number one.

In the US, their recordings were released by the small New York City record label Laurie in 1963, with which they issued four singles without success. When the Beatles broke through in January 1964, Laurie's next regular single release of "Don't Let the Sun Catch You Crying" (Laurie 3284) became a big hit and, during 1964, Laurie coupled "How Do You Do It?" with "You'll Never Walk Alone" (Laurie 3261), and "I Like It" with "Jambalaya (On the Bayou)" (Laurie 3271), with some success. They appeared in the landmark concert film T.A.M.I. Show, released in December 1964, performing alongside Chuck Berry, The Beach Boys, James Brown and The Rolling Stones.

By late 1965, their popularity was rapidly declining on both sides of the Atlantic. They disbanded either in October 1966 or sometime in early-to-mid-1967, (or perhaps in 1969) with much of their later recorded material never released in the UK. Gerry Marsden maintained a low-key (but popular) career on television, including on TV variety shows and as a regular slot on children's television in The Sooty Show. He also starred in the West End musical Charlie Girl alongside Derek Nimmo and Anna Neagle.

While working as a solo artist, Gerry Marsden began working with pianist and musical director Jose McLaughlin in 1970. In 1972, Gerry Marsden and McLaughlin reformed the Pacemakers in 1972 with fellow Liverpool musicians Billy Kinsley (bass) and Pete Clarke (drums). Kinsley had previously been a member of The Merseybeats, the Kinsleys, and Rockin' Horse. (Kinsley would later reunite Rockin' Horse after leaving the Pacemakers and rename his new group Liverpool Express). Clarke had previously been a member of a band called The Escorts. In April 1973, this second version of the group became the only Merseybeat band to ever record for the John Peel Show on BBC Radio. The tracks from that show have now been included on the album Gerry and the Pacemakers Live at the BBC, released on Parlophone Records in October 2018. Since then, Marsden often toured with various lineups of the band on the oldies circuit. By the mid-1980s, Gerry and the Pacemakers toured nine months every year (in the words of David Fricke of Rolling Stone) "doing lucrative cabaret gigs and nostalgia rock shows in Europe, North America, and Australia."

Gerry Marsden returned to number one in the UK charts twice during the 1980s with re-recordings of two of his hits with the Pacemakers, with all profits going to charity. In 1985 after the Bradford Football Club stadium tragedy in which 56 were killed, he formed a group called the Crowd, which included other musicians, singers, and radio disc jockeys, to produce a new version of "You'll Never Walk Alone". On 18 April 1989, three days after the Hillsborough disaster in which 97 Liverpool F.C. fans died, he joined forces with Paul McCartney, the Christians, Holly Johnson, and the production trio Stock, Aitken & Waterman on a new version of "Ferry Cross the Mersey".

Drummer Freddie Marsden later opened the Pacemaker driving school in Formby after having previously worked for British Telecom during the 1980s. He died on 9 December 2006 in Southport, age 66.

On 15 March 2017, Gerry Marsden collapsed onstage due to a sore knee while performing at a concert in Newport, Wales. After being helped offstage, Marsden did not return but was quoted as saying the incident was "nothing serious".

Gerry Marsden announced his retirement on 29 November 2018, in order to spend more time with family, but, on 6 June 2019, to commemorate Liverpool's win against Tottenham in the Champions League, he surprised Take That fans by singing "You'll Never Walk Alone" at their show at Anfield.

Original bass player Les Chadwick died on 26 December 2019. (After the original lineup broke up during the 1960s, Chadwick moved to Australia.)

In 2020, during the COVID-19 pandemic, Gerry Marsden released a new version of "You'll Never Walk Alone" in tribute to the National Health Service.

Marsden died on 3 January 2021 at Arrowe Park Hospital in Merseyside, after being diagnosed with a blood infection in his heart. He was 78 years old.

Les Maguire, the last surviving member of the classic 1960s lineup, died on 25 November 2023. (Some time after the original lineup split during the 1960s, Maguire joined the Royal Navy, where he was still serving and employed during 1985).

== Liverpool F.C. ==
Gerry and the Pacemakers' song "You'll Never Walk Alone" was adopted by Liverpool F.C. as their anthem. Ironically, Marsden was a fan of the club's Merseyside rivals Everton, and made his band wear Everton blue jackets when they went to Hamburg, Germany.

The chart-topping song quickly gained popularity within the Liverpool community and became the Reds' football anthem shortly thereafter.

Gerry Marsden gave Liverpool manager Bill Shankly a copy of the single during a pre-season trip in 1963, the manager said to have been in awe of the song. Since then, the song has been played prior to every Liverpool home game at Anfield, with the club also eventually adding "You'll Never Walk Alone" to its coat of arms and using the phrase as an official motto. The sea of red scarves raised by Liverpool fans in The Kop as they sing their anthem pre-game has become one of the most iconic images in the sport of football.

== Members ==
This is a partial list of band members.

Current members (Gerry's Pacemakers)

- Darren Tingey - vocals, bass (2022–present)
- Jimmy Stanley - guitar (2023–present)
- Dean Hilborne - drums (2023–present)
- John Meaney - keyboards, vocals (2024–present)

Former members (Gerry and the Pacemakers)

The original lineup of "Gerry and the Pacemakers" are in bold

- **Gerry Marsden** – lead vocals, guitar (1956–1966, 1972–2018; died 2021)
- **Les Chadwick** – bass (1956–1966; died 2019)
- **Freddie Marsden** – backing vocals, drums (1956–1966; died 2006)
- Arthur (Mack) McMahon – piano (1956–1961)
- Faron Ruffley – vocals (January–February 1961)
- **Les Maguire** – harmony and backing vocals, piano (1961–1966, 1980s; died 2023)
- Jose McLaughlin – piano, guitar, musical director (1972–1974)
- Billy Kinsley – bass (1972–1975?)
- Pete Clarke – drums (1972–1978)
- Dave Burgess – drums (1978–1983)
- Neil Rhodes – bass (1981–1982)
- Alan Greenwood – piano (1981–1982)
- Keff McCulloch – backing vocals (1990s)
- Tracey McCulloch – backing vocals (1990s)
- Andy Taylor – guitar (1993)
- Tony Young - vocals, keyboards (1996–2018)
- Steve Thompson - lead guitar, vocals (2001 - 2018)
- Nick Woolgar - drums (2012 - 2018)
- Andy Wild - Keyboards (2003 - 2012)
- Rick Medlock - drums
- Andy Cairns, bass guitar
- Sean Fitzpatrick. drums

Former members (Gerry's Pacemakers)

Members of Gerry's Pacemakers who were in Gerry and the Pacemakers are in bold

- Tee Green - vocals (2021–2022)
- John Summerton - vocals, lead guitar (2021–2023)
- Mike Steed - bass (2021–2022)
- **Tony Young** - vocals, keyboards (2021–2023)
- Andy Mapp - drums (2021–2022)
- **Rick Medlock** - drums (2022–2023)
- Rob Linacre - lead vocals (2022–2023)
- Tony Hancox - vocals, keyboards (2023–2024)

== Discography ==
Studio albums

- How Do You Like It? (1963) (UK) / I'm the One (1964) (Canada)
- Don't Let the Sun Catch You Crying (1964) (US)
- Gerry and the Pacemakers' Second Album (1964) (US)
- Gerry's Second Album (1965) (Canada)
- Ferry Cross the Mersey (1965) (soundtrack album) (with various artists, including The Fourmost, The George Martin Orchestra, and Cilla Black (UK release), as well as The Black Knights, Earl Royce and the Olympics, and The Blackwells (US release); both UK and US releases feature 3 (different) select tracks from other musicians featured in the movie)
- I'll Be There (1965)
- Girl on a Swing (1966) (US)
- Gerry and the Pacemakers...Today! (1967) (Canada)
- A Portrait of Gerry and the Pacemakers (1981) (mix of new songs and re-recorded hits)
- 20 Year Anniversary Album (1983)

== See also ==
- List of artists who reached number one on the UK Singles Chart
- List of artists by total number of UK number one singles
- List of Columbia Graphophone Company artists
- List of bands and artists from Merseyside
- List of performers on Top of the Pops
