= Unleashed from the Pleasuredome =

Live album by Holly Johnson
- Released: 16 December 2014
- Genre: Synth-pop
- Length: 101:21
- Label: Abbey Road Live Here Now

Holly Johnson chronology
Europa (2014)	Unleashed from the Pleasuredome (2014)

Unleashed from the Pleasuredome is the first live album from English singer-songwriter Holly Johnson, released by Abbey Road Live Here Now in 2014.

== Background ==
With the release of his first album in 15 years, 2014's Europa, Johnson announced his first UK solo tour in October of that year, named after what Johnson described as "the most upbeat song on the Europa album"; "Dancing with No Fear". The tour, which was Johnson's first since the final Frankie Goes to Hollywood shows in 1987, marked the 30th anniversary of the release of the band's debut album Welcome to the Pleasuredome. Speaking of the tour, Johnson revealed, "Since performing at festivals each summer here in the UK, I realised how enjoyable it is to sing the songs that I have written, and look forward to performing material from my new album. I'm really excited to be able to play songs that written throughout my career. Being able to tour as a solo artist in the 21st Century with a back catalogue and new material is a very privileged position to be in."

On 28 October 2014, Johnson played live at Koko venue in London, which was the last night of the UK tour. The show was recorded for the release of a live album, which was released in December. The album contains nineteen tracks, and is a mixture of Johnson's solo tracks and Frankie Goes to Hollywood songs. In a 2015 interview, Johnson was asked if the recording of the Koko show was pre-planned. He replied, "It was midway, actually, as the tour continued to Germany. It was a good show to record actually as by the time I got to Cologne in December I developed Laryngitis which was unfortunate."

== Release ==
Unleashed From the Pleasuredome was released as a digital download and as a two-disc CDr album in the UK and Europe by Abbey Road Live Here Now. The CDr version was packaged in a 6-panel digisleeve, with the front sleeve being a painting by Johnson. The album was made available online at Abbey Road Live, and also sold at future live shows. A limited stock of the CDr was also made available later via Johnson's official website store. The label is operated by the UK-based Live Here Now team, who professionally capture live concert shows and produces copies for purchase as CD-R packages.

== Track listing ==
Disc one
No.	Title	Writer(s)	Length
1.	"Atomic City"	Holly Johnson, Dan Hartman	5:07
2.	"Warriors of the Wasteland"	Peter Gill, Johnson, Brian Nash, Mark O'Toole	3:45
3.	"Welcome to the Pleasuredome"	Gill, Johnson, O'Toole	5:44
4.	"Rage Hard"	Gill, Johnson, Nash, O'Toole	5:39
5.	"Love Train"	Johnson	4:53
6.	"Follow Your Heart"	Johnson	5:55
7.	"In and Out of Love"	Johnson	4:08
8.	"Heaven's Here"	Johnson	4:26
9.	"Americanos"	Johnson	4:39
10.	"Lonesome Town"	Johnson	4:42

Disc two
No.	Title	Writer(s)	Length
1.	"Europa"	Johnson, Vangelis	5:14
2.	"Disco Heaven"	Johnson	5:18
3.	"Dancing With No Fear"	Johnson	8:29
4.	"Penny Arcade"	Johnson	5:16
5.	"So Much It Hurts"	Johnson	4:32
6.	"Watching the Wildlife"	Gill, Johnson, Nash, O'Toole	4:21
7.	"Relax"	Gill, Johnson, Nash, O'Toole	6:03
8.	"Two Tribes"	Gill, Johnson, O'Toole	6:40
9.	"The Power of Love"	Johnson, Gill, O'Toole, Nash	6:22

== Personnel ==
- Holly Johnson – vocals
- Kristin Hosein – backing vocals
- Lyndon Connah – keyboards, backing vocals
- Rob Hughes – keyboards, flute, saxophone, backing vocals
- Pete Rinaldi – guitar, accordion, backing vocals
- Richard Brook (MD) – drums

=== Additional personnel ===
- Ian Duncan, Rob Brinkmann – recording
- Gary Langan – front of house engineer
- Julian Bishop – monitor engineer
- Claire Murphy, Jerry Eddison, Lewis Young – backline technicians
- Elspeth Hughes – systems technician
- Necker – mixing
- Martin Nicholas – lighting director
- Nikki Eede – tour manager
- Philip Marshall – design
- Rebecca Thomas – live photography
- Holly Johnson – painting
