= Dreams That Money Can't Buy =

Studio album by Holly Johnson
- Released: 8 April 1991 (UK); 29 April 1991 (Europe)
- Studio: Townhouse (London); Ridge Farm (Surrey); Metropolis (London); Marcus (Fulham)
- Genre: Dance; synth-pop
- Length: 40:06
- Label: MCA
- Producer: Andy Richards (tracks 1–6, 8–10); Dan Hartman (track 7)

Holly Johnson chronology
Hollelujah (1990)	Dreams That Money Can't Buy (1991)	Soulstream (1999)

Dreams That Money Can't Buy is the second solo studio album by the English singer and musician Holly Johnson, released by MCA Records in 1991. The album was produced by Andy Richards, except "Penny Arcade" which was produced by Dan Hartman.

== Background ==
Following his 1989 UK chart topping debut album Blast, Johnson began writing and recording his second album in 1990. The first single preceding the album was "Where Has Love Gone?", which was released in November 1990 and reached No. 73 in the UK. The follow-up was "Across the Universe", which reached No. 99 following its release in March 1991. The entire album had been completed in early 1991, however Johnson's relations with MCA then collapsed when the label, disappointed by the limited success of the two singles, decided to limit the marketing budget for the album.

Dreams That Money Can't Buy was given a half-hearted release later in the year and with little promotion it failed to chart. The third and final single, "The People Want to Dance", was released in September but also failed to chart. Having left the label by the time of the album's release, Johnson discovered he was HIV positive in November 1991, which resulted in him largely withdrawing from music.

In a 1991 interview with Melody Maker, Johnson said of the album, "With this album, I wanted to write 10 songs with great grooves and I think I achieved it as much as I'm able to achieve it in this current situation in my life. I do make an effort to make classic pop, but it's a path fraught with difficulties. I like to write about human issues, but sometimes you can sound like a right wanker, and I would hate to be thought of as a preacher." He added, "The LP will do as well as the record company want it to do. They'll promote it as much or as little as they desire, it's out of my hands, and all I can do is think about the next project."

In a 2014 interview with The Arts Desk, Johnson spoke of the failure of the album and the making of it,

"It was written under pressure. I'd had this validation of a No.1 album and suddenly found myself with a contractual obligation to deliver an album in a certain time period. I was chained to the keyboard and sampling machine for what seemed like an eternity. I still stand by some of the songs, but the tide had turned in music-land and in my life. The person who signed me to MCA was either pushed out or left and, as so often happens in that situation, with my champion gone the label turned on me. In a way it was blessing because soon after that I was very ill and had a whole other challenge in my life."

== Song information ==
In 1991, Johnson described "I Need Your Love" as his attempt at writing a "classic love song". "When the Party's Over" was written "from the perspective of an older person whose young lover just wants to be out partying all night". "Penny Arcade" was written before the release of Johnson's 1989 debut album Blast and it was inspired by the "prostitution and drugs and rent boys in the West End". Johnson called "Do It for Love" "Eurodisco meets Stephen Sondheim" and described "You're a Hit" as a "very up song, pretty cool, with an American Princey rock groove and very radio lyrics". Johnson purposely made "The Great Love Story" "epic", a "big production number" a "genuine finale", with him vocally in "full Shirley Bassey mode".

English singer-songwriter and friend Kirsty MacColl appeared on the album track "Boyfriend '65". Johnson, who wrote the song in 1983, was inspired by the magazine Boyfriend and, in particular, the 1965 annual, which became a "treasured possession" to him. He recalled in 1991, "I used the William Burroughs lyric technique for the song thanks to the annual. The song is funny, by the way." He originally to record the song as a duet with MacColl in 1984, but this did not materialise. Johnson recalled in 2010, "I had wanted to do the song as a duet with her as far back as 1984, but Island Records and then MCA wouldn't allow it for some reason, so I asked her to do it as a backing vocalist when I finally got round to recording it properly."

In 2010, Johnson chose "Penny Arcade" and "The Great Love Story" as his two favourite tracks from the album. He added that he would have liked to have seen "Penny Arcade" released as a single, noting "there could have been some really good remixes done for that".

== Critical reception ==
Professional ratings
Review scores
Source	Rating
AllMusic	2/5 stars
NME	3/10
Record Collector	2/5 stars
Select	2/5 stars

Upon its release, Steve Stewart of The Press and Journal wrote, "Ten out of ten for Holly for effort. All the songs were written by him, but it is a shame they all sound the same." Robbert Tilli of Music & Media commented, "The music is still pop, but more dance-orientated than ever." He highlighted "The Great Love Story" as the album's best track. Ian Gittins of Melody Maker was critical in his review, describing the album as "some kind of dismal nadir", "sheer drivel" and "risible guff" which "plumbs some spectacularly sad depths". He commented, "Left to his own devices, Holly hasn't got a clue. His songwriting is desperate, invariably trite and cliched, and even the tired cabaret material he manages to scrape up is let down by his mewling whine of a vocal. This disc has no need to exist."

Simon Williams of the NME was also unimpressed with the album and was particularly critical of the "synthetic orchestrations", writing, "They're all over the place here, beeping and parping like the 50th rate trumpets and string sections they really are, and generally making a thorough nuisance of themselves in between the mildly hectic electro beats and Holly's woefully wasted larynx." He singled out "The Great Love Story" for being "moodier than most" and "almost sweeping into classy Pet Shop Boys territory", as well as "I Need Your Love" for being the album's "one convincing moment" and a "shiny apple in a vat of worms". He concluded, "Dreams That Money Can't Buy sees an old talent horribly overdrawn."

In a retrospective review, Jon O'Brien of AllMusic stated, "Even taking into account the fact that the dated production would have sounded a little fresher back in the early '90s, it's not difficult to see why the label appeared to have such a lack of confidence. With nothing here even approaching a 'Love Train' or 'Americanos,' let alone a 'Relax' or 'Two Tribes,' it's a disappointingly bland affair from an artist whose previous career was anything but." Terry Staunton of Record Collector said in a review of the 2011 re-issue, "Dreams That Money Can't Buy lack[s] the joyousness of Blast and proved to be a lacklustre swansong. Both 'Across the Universe' and 'Where Has Love Gone?' come across as half-formed synth dance workouts, their elevation to single status baffling. There's little variation in the overall sound, the drama of Johnson's voice struggling to find comfort in the soulless, mechanical rhythms, only ever making a strong impression on the tropical pop of 'Boyfriend '65', a fun duet with Kirsty MacColl."

== Track listing ==
=== Original release ===
All tracks written by Holly Johnson.

1. "Across the Universe" – 3:55
2. "When the Party's Over" – 3:59
3. "The People Want to Dance" – 4:20
4. "I Need Your Love" – 3:57
5. "Boyfriend '65" – 3:08
6. "Where Has Love Gone?" – 4:17
7. "Penny Arcade" – 4:07
8. "Do It for Love" – 3:45
9. "You're a Hit" – 3:29
10. "The Great Love Story" – 4:58

=== Dreams That Money Can't Buy (Expanded Edition) (2011) ===
==== Disc 1 – Original Album and Single B-Sides ====
1. "Across the Universe" – 3:55
2. "When the Party's Over" – 4:01
3. "The People Want to Dance" – 4:21
4. "I Need Your Love" – 3:57
5. "Boyfriend '65" – 3:08
6. "Where Has Love Gone?" – 4:18
7. "Penny Arcade" – 4:07
8. "Do It for Love" – 3:47
9. "You're a Hit" – 3:30
10. "The Great Love Story" – 4:59
11. "Perfume" (Aromatherapy Mix 7" Edit) – 4:26
12. "Funky Paradise" – 4:15
13. "The People Want to Dance" (Apollo 440 Remix 7" Edit) – 4:22

==== Disc 2 – Remixes and Rarities ====
1. "Where Has Love Gone?" (The Search For Love Mix) – 7:28
2. "Where Has Love Gone?" (Dreaming Mix) – 4:20
3. "Where Has Love Gone?" (GTO Mix) – 6:34
4. "Across the Universe" (Space A Go-Go Mix) – 6:34
5. "Across the Universe" (Peter Lorimer 7" Remix) – 3:59
6. "Across the Universe" (Peter Lorimer 12" Instrumental) – 7:04
7. "The People Want to Dance" (Rave Hard! Mix) – 3:25
8. "The People Want to Dance" (Raving Harder! Mix) – 5:12
9. "The People Want to Dance" (Apollo 440 12" Mix) – 6:23
10. "The People Want to Dance" (12" Dubmix) – 5:55
11. "Americanos" (Magimix Dub) – 4:11
12. "Atomic City" (Enviro-Mental Instrumental) – 6:37
13. "Natural" (Full Song Mix) – 3:33

==== Disc 3 – DVD – Promotional Videos ====
1. "Where Has Love Gone?" (Promo Video)
2. "Across the Universe" (Promo Video)
3. "Blast Promo"

== Personnel ==
- Holly Johnson – lead vocals, keyboard programming, executive producer
- Beverley Skeete, Claudia Fontaine, Derek Green, Don Snow, Stevie Lange, Glenn Gregory – backing vocals
- Kirsty MacColl – backing vocals on "Boyfriend 65"
- Courtney Pine – saxophone on "Penny Arcade"
- Andy Richards – producer (tracks 1–6, 8–10), keyboard programming
- Nick Bagnall – keyboard programming

Technical

- Mike "Spike" Drake – engineer (tracks 1–6, 8–10)
- Dan Hartman – producer (track 7)
- Mark McGuire – engineer (track 7)
- Christian Allen, Heidi Cavanough, Peter Lewis, Richard Morris, Stephen Bray – assistant engineers
- Richard Haughton – photography
- Me Company – artwork design
- Paul Bevoir – design
- Barney Ashton – project manager
- Wolfgang Kühle – management
