= Hollelujah =

Hollelujah – The Remix Album

Remix album by Holly Johnson
- Released: 4 June 1990
- Genre: Dance
- Length: 39:59
- Label: MCA
- Producer: Andy Richards; Dan Hartman; Stephen Hague; Steve Lovell

Holly Johnson chronology
Blast (1989)	Hollelujah – The Remix Album (1990)	Dreams That Money Can't Buy (1991)

Hollelujah is a remix album by the English singer and musician Holly Johnson, which was released by MCA in 1990. The album features five remixes and "Hollelujah", a reworking of the chorus of the 1741 oratorio Messiah Part II by George Frideric Handel.

== Track listing ==
All tracks are written by Holly Johnson except "Atomic City" by Johnson and Dan Hartman, and "Hollelujah" by Johnson and George Frideric Handel

No.	Title	Length
1.	"Love Train" (Americanos Big Beat 109 BPM Version)	6:41
2.	"Atomic City" (Enviro – Mental Mix)	7:30
3.	"Perfume" (Aromatherapy-mix)	5:56
4.	"Americanos" (The Perfect Taco Mix)	6:12
5.	"Heaven's Here" (Mount Olympus Mix)	9:27
6.	"Hollelujah"	4:06

== Critical reception ==
Professional ratings
Review scores
Source	Rating
The Dundee Courier and Advertiser	5/10
Record Mirror	2/5 stars

On its release, Kevin Murphy of Record Mirror wrote, "Apart from the title track, this is simply five tracks from last year's brilliant Blast LP remixed. With these [the remixers] illustrious names and such great material to work with the result is disappointing. Most of the songs having the life mixed out and the rhythm left bare. Holly is a precious and charismatic talent and Blast was one of the best albums of '89, but this was obviously conceived by a record company who credit the public with less sense and shorter memories than themselves. The songs are still good it's just the idea that sucks." Paul Lester of Melody Maker felt the album was "okay in parts", but "not much cause to celebrate". He added that the album "commercially-speaking, should keep things nicely ticking over until his next LP". The Dundee Courier and Advertiser noted, "Most of the tracks have a severe lack of immediacy and sound like the type DJs put on the turntable and switch the volume down to three, while everyone heads for the buffet. There's lots of bleeps and burps from synthesisers and Holly's whining drawl, but otherwise not a lot to justify the heavenly title."
