= Basing Street Studios =

Recording studio in London

Coordinates: 51.517612°N 0.204961°W

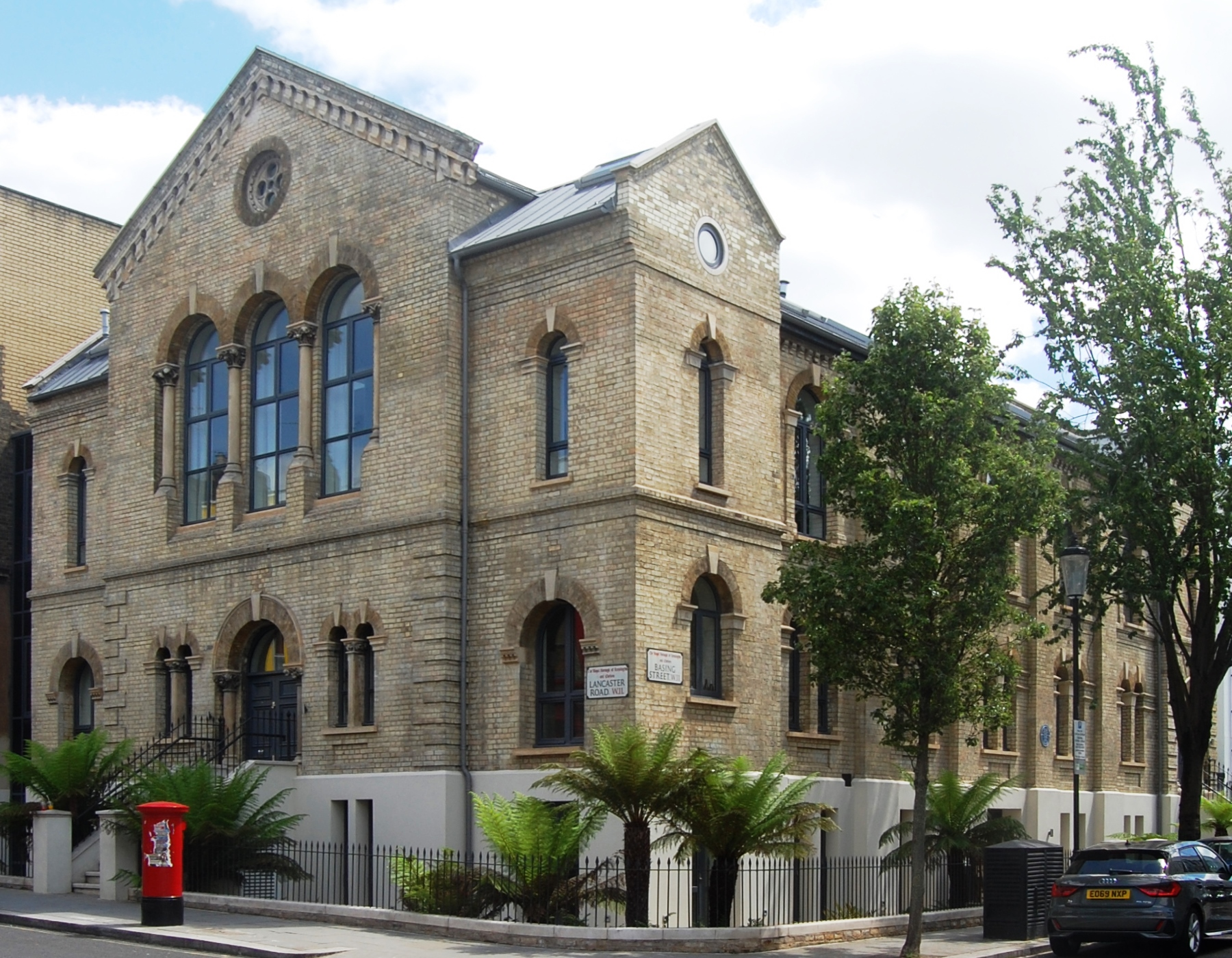
- The building in 2021 following conversion into flats
- Formerly: Island Studios
- Industry: Recording studio
- Founded: 1969; 57 years ago in Notting Hill, London, England
- Founder: Chris Blackwell
- Defunct: 1982
- Fate: Acquired by Jill Sinclair and Trevor Horn
- Successor: Sarm Studios
- Headquarters: 8–10 Basing Street, London, England
- Parent: Island Records

Basing Street Studios was a recording studio in a former 19th-century chapel at 8–10 Basing Street in Notting Hill, London, England. Originally established in 1969 as Island Studios by Chris Blackwell, the founder of Island Records, the building also housed the offices for Island Records from 1969 until 1973, and was renamed Basing Street Studios in 1975. Island/Basing Street Studios produced recordings in the 1970s from artists including the Rolling Stones, Bob Marley and the Wailers, Led Zeppelin, Genesis, Golden Earring, Black Sabbath, Roxy Music, Jethro Tull, Traffic, and Dire Straits. In 1982, the studios were acquired by Sarm Studio owners Jill Sinclair and her husband, the producer Trevor Horn in 1982, and renamed Sarm West.

== History ==
In 1969, Island Records co-founder Chris Blackwell and company directors David Belleridge and John Leftly acquired a deconsecrated 19th-century church building at 8-10 Basing Street, in the Ladbroke Grove area of Notting Hill in West London and established new offices for Island Records. Two recording studios were constructed within the building to establish Island Studios. The construction of the studios utilized a concrete inner room design to prevent the transmission of sound within the building's structure. Studio One's live room was 60 by 40 feet, with 25 foot ceilings, and was large enough to accommodate 80 musicians. The smaller Studio Two, in the building's basement, was 30 by 20 feet, with 10 foot ceilings.

The Basing Street studio was one of the first in London to have a 16-track recorder, and Blackwell commissioned former Olympic Studios Technical Director Richard "Dick" Swettenham to build a recording console for the new studios, resulting in the formation of Helios Electronics and its first console, Island Studio 2, a 20-input, 8-buss console with 16-channel monitoring.

Stephen Stills recorded most of his self-titled debut solo album at the new studios in 1970, with contributions from Eric Clapton, Jimi Hendrix, Mama Cass, and Ringo Starr. In December of the same year, Led Zeppelin recorded portions of Led Zeppelin IV in Island Studio Two, including "Black Dog" and "Stairway to Heaven", At the same time, Jethro Tull recorded their album Aqualung upstairs in Island Studio One.

Black Sabbath completed their 1970 album Paranoid, including the recording of its title track, at Island, and returned to the studio the following year to record its follow-up, Master of Reality. Traffic recorded portions of John Barleycorn Must Die at Island in 1970, returning the following year to record The Low Spark of High Heeled Boys. The Jeff Beck Group recorded Rough and Ready at Island in 1971. The same year, Mott the Hoople recorded Wildlife at the studio, returning the following year to record Brain Capers. In 1973, the Eagles recorded Desperado at the studio.

Island Studios added a mobile recording truck in 1972, with Genesis using it to record their 1974 album The Lamb Lies Down on Broadway.

Songs recorded at Island Studios include "Without You" by Harry Nilsson, "After Midnight" by Eric Clapton, "All Right Now" by Free, "Peace Train" by Cat Stevens, and "Many Rivers to Cross" by Jimmy Cliff.

Other artists who recorded at Island Studios include Paul McCartney, Go, John Martyn, and Brian Eno.

In 1975, the studios were officially renamed Basing Street Studios and put under the direction of record producer Muff Winwood.

In 1977, during his 14-month self-imposed exile from Jamaica, Bob Marley lived in an apartment upstairs from the studio where the Wailers' albums Catch a Fire and Burnin' had been completed years earlier, recording the album Exodus.

In 1978, Dire Straits recorded their eponymous debut studio album at Basing Street Studios. Other artists who recorded at Basing Street Studios included Fairport Convention, Roxy Music, Sparks, and Joan Armatrading.

== Legacy ==
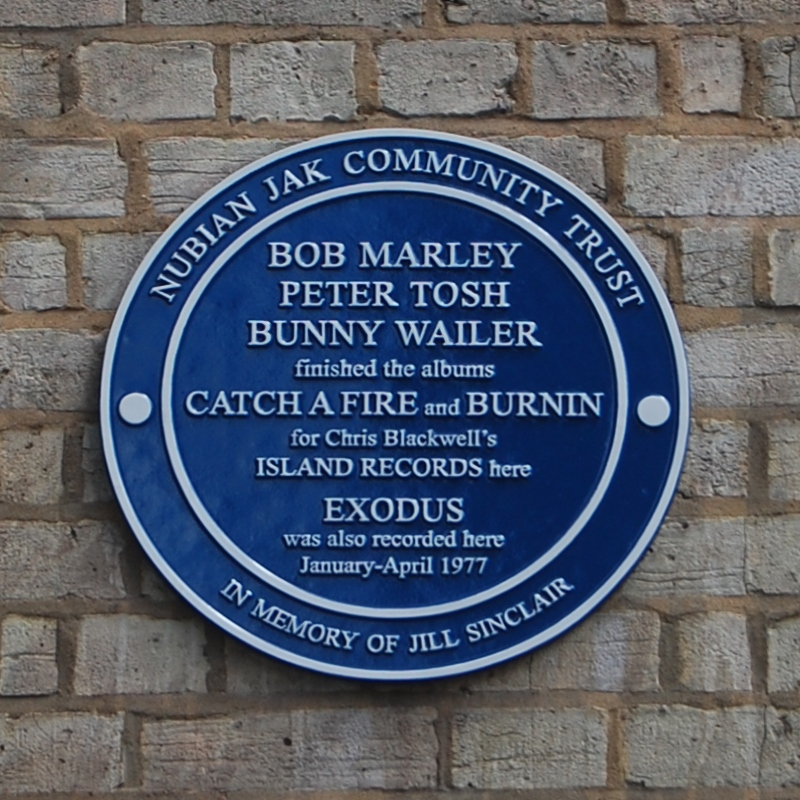
The plaque at the former Basing Street Studios honouring Bob Marley, Peter Tosh, and Bunny Wailer

Jill Sinclair and Trevor Horn, owners of East London's SARM studios, bought Island's Basing Street Studios in 1982, renaming them Sarm West Studios to complement their existing East London studio. Horn and Sinclair also established offices at the Basing Street location for ZTT Records and Stiff Records labels, as well as Perfect Songs and Unforgettable Songs publishing companies. In November 1984, the former Island Studio building was the venue for the recording of "Do They Know It's Christmas?" by the members of Band Aid in support of relief efforts for the 1984–1985 famine in Ethiopia, and in November 2014, the studios were used to record the Band Aid 30 charity single.

SPZ Group closed Sarm West Studios on Basing Street in 2013. In 2018, the former church building was converted into nine luxury flats.

In October 2019, a commemorative blue plaque dedicated by the Nubian Jak Community Trust honoring Bob Marley, Peter Tosh, and Bunny Wailer was placed at the site of the former Island/Basing Street Studios where the Wailers' albums Catch a Fire and Burnin' were completed, as well as the Bob Marley and the Wailers album Exodus.
