= The People Want to Dance =

Single by Holly Johnson

from the album Dreams That Money Can't Buy
- B-side: "The People Want to Dance (Apollo 440 Mix)"
- Released: 2 September 1991
- Genre: Pop
- Length: 4:21 (album version); 3:25 (Rave Hard! mix)
- Label: MCA
- Songwriter(s): Holly Johnson
- Producer(s): Andy Richards

Holly Johnson singles chronology
| "Across the Universe" (1991) | "The People Want to Dance" (1991) | "Legendary Children (All of Them Queer)" (1994) |

"The People Want to Dance" is a song by English singer Holly Johnson, released by MCA on 2 September 1991 as the third and final single from his second studio album, Dreams That Money Can't Buy. The song was written by Holly Johnson and produced by Andy Richards. It peaked at number 108 in the UK Singles Chart.

== Background ==
In a 1991 interview with Melody Maker, Johnson said of the song's message,

"It was written sympathetically about all the raves that were getting shut down. But then I was trying to put out that there are alternatives to just getting wasted and going out dancing. There's nothing wrong with that. It's an inherent part of the human mating ritual and being a teenager and going out, but there are other things too. We've got a planet here in dire need of saving, a whole economic structure that's fucked up completely, and if all you can do is go out and take acid and dance, then there's not much of a future for it. You've gotta do something about it, however small."

== Release ==
"The People Want to Dance" was released as the third and final single from Dreams That Money Can't Buy. At the time of the album's release, Johnson's relations with MCA cooled over dissatisfaction with the promotional budgets they assigned to it. By the time "The People Want to Dance" was released as a single, five months after the album, Johnson was no longer signed to the record company and it was released without his involvement. Much like the album's first two singles, "Where Has Love Gone?" and "Across the Universe", "The People Want to Dance" was a commercial disappointment, peaking at number 108 in the UK Singles Chart. It was Johnson's last single release until "Legendary Children (All of Them Queer)" in 1994.

== Critical reception ==
In a review of Dreams That Money Can't Buy, Ian Gittins of Melody Maker noted that Johnson "dig[s] up the old 'Two Tribes' bassline" for the song. He added that the song sees Johnson "appoint[ing] himself spokesman for the rave generation, only to embarrass himself with shockingly naff sloganeering". Simon Williams of NME stated, "'The People Want to Dance' does manage to stagger with a remarkably moralistic manifesto which demands, 'Why do we get up in the morning? What makes us go out late at night?' Hmmm. You've got me stumped there, mate." In a retrospective review of the album, Jon O'Brien of AllMusic described it as a "weak attempt at gospel-tinged disco-pop".

== Track listing ==
7-inch single (UK and Germany)

1. "The People Want to Dance" (Rave Hard! Mix) – 3:25
2. "The People Want to Dance" (Apollo 440 Mix) – 4:21

12-inch single (UK and Germany)

1. "The People Want to Dance" (Raving Harder! Mix) – 5:13
2. "The People Want to Dance" (Apollo 440 Mix) – 6:29
3. "Love Train" (Americanos Big Beat Version) – 6:38

CD single (UK and Germany)

1. "The People Want to Dance" (Rave Hard Mix) – 3:25
2. "Love Train" (Americanos Big Beat Version) – 6:38
3. "The People Want to Dance" (Raving Harder! Mix) – 5:13

== Personnel ==
"The People Want to Dance" (Rave Hard! Mix)/(Raving Harder! Mix)

- Holly Johnson – vocals, programming
- Claudia Fontaine – backing vocals
- Beverly Skeete – backing vocals
- Derek Green – backing vocals
- D Marcus C – rap
- Andy Richards – production, programming
- Ben Chapman – additional production, programming
- Mike Drake – additional production, mixing
- Gary Maughn – programming

"The People Want to Dance" (Apollo 440 Mix)

- Apollo 440 – additional production
- Howard Grey – mixing

"Love Train" (Americanos Big Beat Version)

- Steve Lovell – production
- Stephen Hague – additional production
- Frankie Knuckles – remixing, additional remixing
- Peter Schwartz – additional remixing
- Satoshi Tomiie – additional remixing

Other

- Instinct – design

== Charts ==
| Chart (1991) | Peak position |
|---|---|
| UK Singles Chart (OCC) | 108 |
