= Holly Johnson =

British singer (born 1960)

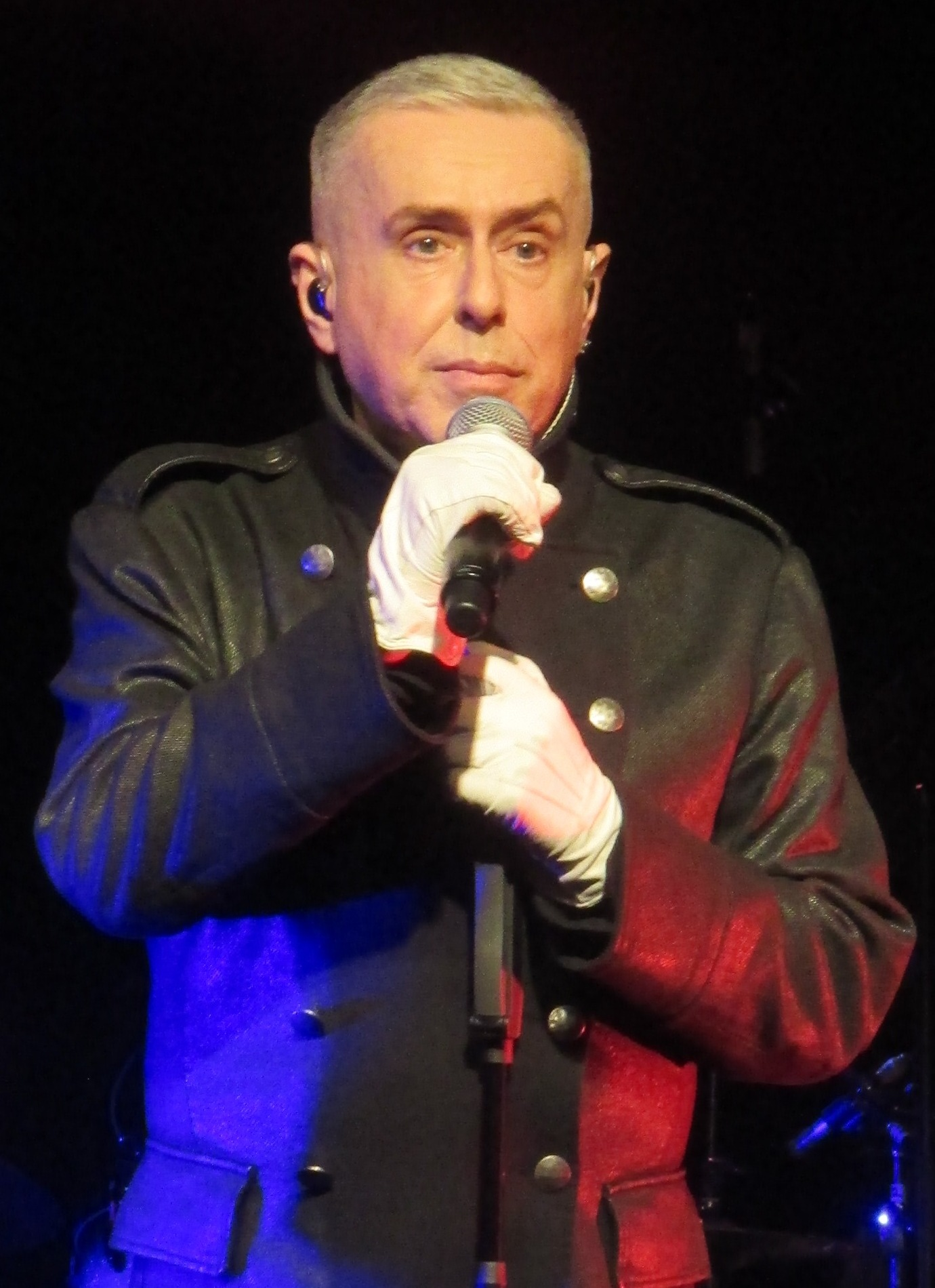
- Johnson performing in 2014

Background information
- Born: William Johnson; 9 February 1960 (age 66); Liverpool, England
- Genres: Pop; dance; new wave
- Occupations: Singer; songwriter; painter
- Years active: 1977–present
- Labels: Uni; MCA; Eric's Club; ZTT
- Formerly of: Frankie Goes to Hollywood; Big in Japan
- Website: hollyjohnson.com

William "Holly" Johnson (born 9 February 1960) is an English singer, songwriter and artist. He is best known as lead vocalist of Frankie Goes to Hollywood, who achieved huge commercial success in the mid-1980s. Prior to that, in the late 1970s he was a bassist for the band Big in Japan. In 1989, Johnson's debut solo album, Blast, reached number one in the UK Albums Chart. Two singles from the album – "Love Train" and "Americanos" – reached the top 5 of the UK Singles Chart. In the 1990s, he also embarked on writing, painting, and printmaking careers.

== Early life ==
Johnson was born on 9 February 1960 in Liverpool, England, to Eric and Pat (née McGlouchlin) Johnson. His paternal grandfather Patrick was Irish and his maternal grandfather Patrick McGlouchlin was of three-quarters Indian descent. Johnson was the third of four children and was nicknamed Billy as a child. He started his education in Liverpool at St Mary's Church of England primary school and at age eleven went to the Liverpool Collegiate School in Everton. At 14, Johnson took on the name Holly, inspired by actress Holly Woodlawn, a friend of Andy Warhol.

During his second year at Liverpool Collegiate, Johnson and his friend were teased and nicknamed Jolly Johnson and Honey Heath. The two shared an interest in Marc Bolan and David Bowie.

Johnson met his partner, Wolfgang Kuhle, in the early 1980s.

== Career ==
While he attended Liverpool Collegiate, Johnson was actively involved in that city's punk rock/new wave scene of the late 1970s. Johnson played bass with the local band Big in Japan and also released two solo singles on the Eric's label. Both "Yankee Rose" and "Hobo Joe" failed to chart, however.

=== Frankie Goes to Hollywood ===
After gaining some measure of local celebrity from being a member of Big in Japan, Johnson became involved with a group of younger musicians who together would become the nucleus of Frankie Goes to Hollywood. Johnson himself named the new band after seeing the headline of an article about Frank Sinatra. This new band quickly gained a reputation for their stage show which had strong sadomasochistic overtones. It was during this period that guitarist Brian Nash and backing vocalist Paul Rutherford completed the band's established lineup.

After the band's reputation grew large enough to attract record company interest, they were eventually signed to a new record company, ZTT. Johnson became exposed to the general public via the phenomenal success of their debut single "Relax", which was a huge, and controversial, hit in 1984. The band's first three singles - "Relax" (1983), "Two Tribes" (1984), and "The Power of Love" (1984) all reached No. 1 of the UK Singles Chart; their fourth single, "Welcome to the Pleasuredome" (1985) reached No. 2. Frankie's debut album Welcome to the Pleasuredome, released in October 1984, sold around a quarter of a million copies in its first week, peaked at No. 1 on the UK Albums Chart, and was a top-10 seller internationally.

After such success during 1984, when the band spent nearly four months at the top of the singles chart, Johnson was firmly established as a household name. By autumn 1986, his star had faded considerably. Frankie Goes to Hollywood had not released any material since early 1985 and were absent from that year's Live Aid event. In addition, Johnson did not perform on the successful charity single "Do They Know It's Christmas?" by Band Aid in December 1984.

Recorded in March–July 1986, Frankie Goes to Hollywood's second album, Liverpool, was released the following October. Liverpool peaked at No. 5 in the UK Albums Chart and spawned three singles: "Rage Hard" (1986), "Warriors of the Wasteland" (1986), and "Watching the Wildlife" (1987). "Rage Hard" was a top 5 hit in the UK Singles Chart, peaking at #4, but "Warriors of the Wasteland" and "Watching the Wildlife" peaked at #19 and #28 respectively, suggesting Frankie's popularity was waning. Furthermore, the band was wracked by infighting; by 1987, Johnson's relationship with the rest of the band had broken down irretrievably, not helped by his decision to gain legal rights to exclusive use of the band's name, without consultation with other members. The UK Intellectual Property Office ruled against Johnson, however. During a reunion on the TV show Bands Reunited many years later, when the five members of Frankie Goes to Hollywood were invited to play together using equipment that had been set up for them, he (and guitarist Brian Nash) declined to take part, but he did not rule out the possibility in the future. In his own words; "If it happens, we do it properly. We have a reputation. I'm not a wedding singer!"

=== Solo career and later projects ===
==== ZTT injunction ====
Johnson left Frankie Goes to Hollywood in 1987 because of disagreements regarding their musical direction. He became the subject of an injunction from the group's record company, ZTT Records, and its sister publishing company, Perfect Songs, which cited a breach of his prior recording and publishing contracts, thus barring him from pursuing a solo career with any other new label. He embarked on a two-year legal battle with ZTT, the case being settled in Johnson's favour on 10 February 1988, the judge ruling that the original contracts had constituted an unreasonable restraint of trade, remarking that "Mr. Johnson could be 70 years old and still be bound to this contract".

ZTT unsuccessfully appealed against the judge's decision, the Appeal Court concluding on 26 July 1989 that the original recording and publishing contracts were "not a fair bargain". The result represented a landmark legal outcome, contemporary press reports stating that the result "set a legal precedent which rocked the music business", adding that ZTT had by this time released most of its artists from their original contracts.

Johnson's relationship with ZTT owners Trevor Horn and Jill Sinclair broke down irretrievably due to the court case: "They, [Horn and Sinclair] have never really forgiven me for winning my freedom in the law courts", the singer said in 2001, adding that the worst part of being in FGTH was "the contract we signed with ZTT."

==== Blast (1989–1994) ====
In 1989, Johnson finally made his first solo debut with the album Blast, for MCA Records, which was a major success and reached UK No. 1. Singles "Love Train", "Americanos" and "Atomic City" met with warm reception, the former two both charting in the UK's top 5. Johnson took part in a charity project for the Hillsborough disaster fund and recorded a popular single "Ferry Cross the Mersey" with Paul McCartney, the Christians and others. The single reached number 1 in the UK and Ireland.

After the 1990 remix album Hollelujah, Johnson released his second solo album in 1991. Dreams That Money Can't Buy was a commercial failure and did not chart in the UK, while the singles "Where Has Love Gone?" and "Across the Universe" performed very poorly on UK singles chart. In November 1991, Johnson learned that he was HIV positive. This triggered a temporary withdrawal from the music business and public life in general, with one of his last TV performances around the time being at the Diamond Record Awards, Antwerp, where he performed "Americanos" and "Where Has Love Gone?". His HIV status was made public during an interview with The Times in April 1993.

==== A Bone in My Flute (1994–2009) ====
In March 1994, Johnson's critically acclaimed autobiography A Bone in My Flute was published, in which he discusses his struggle with, and acceptance of, his homosexuality. The same year, he recorded a new single, "Legendary Children (All of Them Queer)", whose lyrics referred to famous LGBT people throughout history. During 1994, he performed live at London's Gay Pride show, where he performed "Relax", "Legendary Children" and "The Power of Love". The same month Johnson featured on and co-wrote the single "Love and Hate" by Ryuichi Sakamoto for his album Sweet Revenge.

Since the mid-1990s, Johnson has worked primarily as a painter. His works have been exhibited at the Tate Liverpool and the Royal Academy. He has contributed to Modern Painters and the Paul Smith-sponsored Carlos magazine. He made a musical comeback in 1999, with a self-released album called Soulstream, preceded by the 1998 promo only single "Hallelujah!". The video for the first available single "Disco Heaven" featured a cameo performance from Boy George. However, the album passed fairly unnoticed and didn't chart. The only charting single from Soulstream was a new version of "The Power of Love". For the release of Soulstream, Johnson appeared on the Jools Holland Show performing "The Power of Love" and performed the song again in 2004 for ZDF Love Songs.

In April 1998, he performed "The Power of Love" live at the Easter Gay Happening in Krefeld, Germany at Club Königsburg.

==== In the Beginning (2009–2023) ====
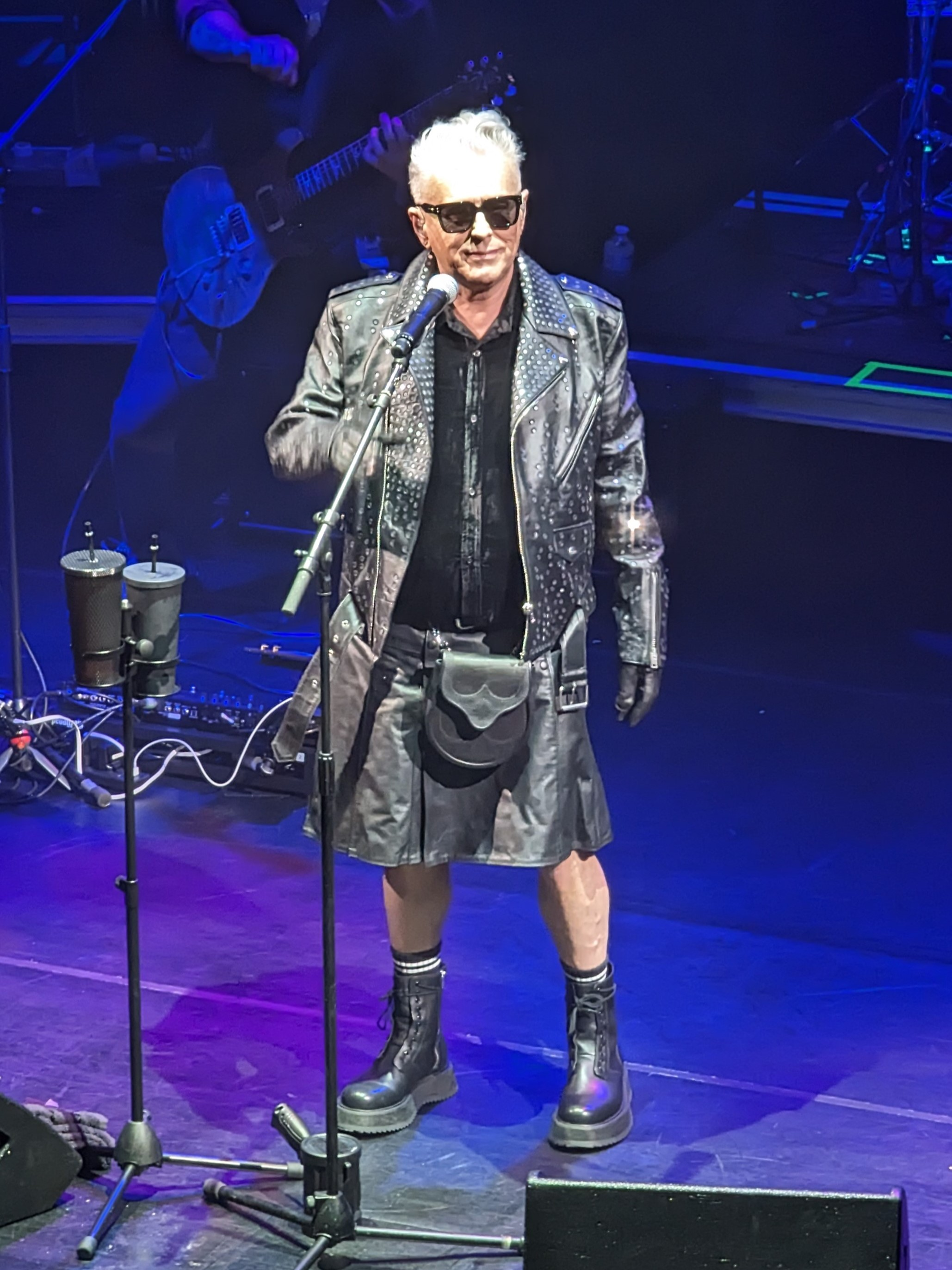
Johnson performing at the Pavilion Theatre in Glasgow in 2023.

In August 2009, Johnson presented an hour-long show "In the Beginning" on BBC Radio 2 about the Beatles, while he also appeared in the new video for Frankie Goes to Hollywood's "Relax" as the DJ. Since then, he has performed The Power of Love twice in Germany, also performing the song at the opening of Life Ball 2011 in Vienna. In an interview at the Q Awards, Johnson announced plans for an album of new material. In 2010, Johnson performed "Americanos" on German TV, and "Relax" on French TV. During February 2011, Johnson joined Jools Holland and his band for a version of the Animals' "The House of the Rising Sun" song, a track that Johnson covered on his Soulstream album. In August 2011, he performed a full set live at the Rewind Festival, using a mix of Frankie Goes to Hollywood songs together with some of his solo hits "Americanos", "Heaven's Here" and "Love Train".

On 5 December 2013, Johnson performed at Save The Children's Christmas Tree Sessions at London's Union Chapel. He closed the evening with 'The Power Of Love' accompanied by Gaz Coombes on guitar. In May 2014, Johnson announced his first UK solo tour, named "Dancing with No Fear". The seven-date tour was preceded by a new solo album, released on 15 September. The album, titled Europa, was preceded by a lead single, "Follow Your Heart".

The second single from Europa, "In And Out Of Love", was released on 4 September 2014 with a special pop promo directed by Chris Shepherd. In October 2014 Europa entered the UK Album Chart at # 63, becoming Johnson's first album to chart in the UK since his debut Blast. In December 2014, Johnson released a live album, only available as merchandise during the tour and his website titled Unleashed From the Pleasuredome.

In late 2015, Johnson co-wrote a song with Gary Barlow for the film Eddie The Eagle. The song "Ascension" was released in March 2016 as the focus track for the album Fly (songs inspired by the film Eddie The Eagle) and appears on the end credits for the film. In 2018, Johnson guest starred throughout the final episode of the British TV series Benidorm. In 2021, he appeared in the British TV series Never Mind the Buzzcocks and performed "The Power of Love". In 2022, he hosted Pride Not Prejudice on Greatest Hits Radio.

==== Relax (2023–present) ====
In May 2023, Johnson and the other members of Frankie Goes to Hollywood reunited for a one-off performance at the opening night of Eurovision, in their hometown of Liverpool. They performed a single song, "Welcome to the Pleasuredome", from their inaugural album.

In May 2023, Working Title Films announced production of Relax, a musical biographical film about Frankie Goes to Hollywood, based upon Holly Johnson's autobiography A Bone in My Flute (1994), and starring Callum Scott Howells as Johnson. The film is to be written and directed by Bernard Rose, who directed the original music videos for the band's songs "Relax" (1983) and "Welcome to the Pleasuredome" (1985).

From September 2024 to July 2025, the Museum of Liverpool hosted an exhibition called The Holly Johnson Story. It focused on Johnson and HIV/AIDs in the city of Liverpool. It was coproduced by Homotopia, DuoVision Arts and National Museums Liverpool, in collaboration with Holly Johnson.

== Personal life ==
Johnson has been referred to as a "monumental LGBTQ+ icon". In 1991, Johnson was diagnosed with HIV and wrote an autobiography, A Bone in my Flute; he did not expect to live much longer. Johnson remained creative working as a painter and printmaker and writing songs until 1994 when he returned to performing music occasionally. One of Johnson's paintings appears as the cover to the Kirsty MacColl single "Angel".

== Discography ==
=== Studio albums ===
Year	Title	Peak chart positions										Certifications
Year	Title	UK	AUS	AUT	GER	ITA	NLD	NOR	NZL	SWE	SWI	Certifications
1989	Blast	1	97	12	5	10	27	10	11	11	10	BPI: Platinum; BVMI: Gold
1991	Dreams That Money Can't Buy	—	—	—	—	—	—	—	—	—	—	
1999	Soulstream	—	—	—	—	—	—	—	—	—	—	
2014	Europa	63	—	—	—	—	—	—	—	—	—	

=== Live albums ===
Year	Title
2014	Unleashed from the Pleasuredome

=== Singles ===
Year	Title	Peak chart positions													Album
Year	Title	UK	AUS	AUT	CAN	GER	IRE	ITA	NLD	NOR	NZL	SWE	SWI	US	Album
1979	"Yankee Rose"	—	—	—	—	—	—	—	—	—	—	—	—	—	single only
1980	"Hobo Joe"	—	—	—	—	—	—	—	—	—	—	—	—	—	single only
1989	"Love Train"	4	35	17	56	4	5	21	12	10	20	14	8	65	Blast
1989	"Americanos"	4	77	1	—	2	6	10	8	6	10	7	4	—	Blast
1989	"Atomic City"	18	—	19	—	16	9	29	40	—	20	—	10	—	Blast
1989	"Heaven's Here"	62	—	—	—	58	22	—	—	—	—	—	—	—	Blast
1990	"Where Has Love Gone?"	73	147	—	—	—	—	—	—	—	—	—	—	—	Dreams That Money Can't Buy
1991	"Across the Universe"	99	—	—	—	—	—	—	—	—	—	—	—	—	Dreams That Money Can't Buy
1991	"The People Want to Dance"	108	—	—	—	—	—	—	—	—	—	—	—	—	Dreams That Money Can't Buy
1994	"Legendary Children"	85	—	—	—	—	—	—	—	—	—	—	—	—	single only
1998	"Hallelujah!"	—	—	—	—	—	—	—	—	—	—	—	—	—	Soulstream
1999	"Disco Heaven"	85	—	—	—	—	—	—	—	—	—	—	—	—	Soulstream
1999	"The Power of Love"	56	—	—	—	—	—	—	—	—	—	—	—	—	Soulstream
2014	"Follow Your Heart"	—	—	—	—	—	—	—	—	—	—	—	—	—	Europa
2014	"In and Out of Love"	—	—	—	—	—	—	—	—	—	—	—	—	—	Europa
2015	"Heaven's Eyes"	—	—	—	—	—	—	—	—	—	—	—	—	—	Europa
2015	"Dancing With No Fear"	—	—	—	—	—	—	—	—	—	—	—	—	—	Europa
2016	"Ascension"	—	—	—	—	—	—	—	—	—	—	—	—	—	Eddie the Eagle (soundtrack)

=== Guest appearances ===
Year	Title	Peak chart positions									Album
Year	Title	UK	AUS	AUT	GER	IRE	ITA	NLD	NOR	SWI	Album
1986	"Live-In World" (Anti-Heroin Project) (with John Parr, Elkie Brooks, Bonnie Tyler, Nik Kershaw, Kim Wilde, Hazel O'Connor, Cliff Richard, Robin Gibb, Mike Peters and others)	142	—	—	—	-	—	—	—		Non-album single
1989	"Ferry 'Cross the Mersey" (with The Christians, Paul McCartney, Gerry Marsden and Stock Aitken Waterman)	1	45	15	5	1	15	21	4	11	Non-album single
1994	"Love & Hate" (with Ryūichi Sakamoto)	97	—	—	—	—	—	—	—	—	Sweet Revenge
2012	"He Ain't Heavy, He's My Brother" (as part of The Justice Collective)	1	—	—	—	4	—	—	—	—	Non-album single
