= Yaakov Asher Sinclair =

Israeli-British music industry veteran and rabbi

Rabbi Yaakov Asher Sinclair יעקב אשר סינקלייר
- Born: John Sinclair; London, United Kingdom
- Education: Clifton College, Bristol University
- Occupations: Rabbi, Lecturer, Writer, Inspirational Speaker
- Children: 10
- Father: David Sinclair
- Relatives: Jill Sinclair (sister)

Religious life
- Religion: Judaism

Jewish leader
- Organisation: Ohr Somayach
- Residence: Jerusalem, Israel

Yaakov Asher Sinclair is a British-Israeli rabbi living in Jerusalem. Sinclair is an author and lecturer on Jewish religion. He is on the faculty of Ohr Somayach/Tannenbaum College, giving classes on Talmud and philosophy. He had a prior career as an actor, photographer, music producer, and stage producer. Known as John Sinclair until the mid 1980s, he was – along with his father David and sister Jill – director of the SARM East music recording studio.

== Personal life ==
Sinclair was born in London to David Sinclair, who became involved in the music business in the 1960s. He was known as John through early adulthood, and was educated at St. Anthony’s Preparatory School in Hampstead, then Clifton College and Bristol University.

He is married to a fellow ba'alas teshuva (returnee to Orthodox Judaism) from Buenos Aires. They have ten children. One of their children, Avi, is proprietor of an award-winning pizza restaurant

== Entertainment career ==
Sinclair was part of the cast of the original West End production of Hair, but had to leave the production due to injury during rehearsals. He formed Druidcast Music, a publishing company, together with his friend, recording engineer Andy Leighton. They signed Richard O'Brien, Sinclair's castmate from Hair, and later invited him into the company as a partner. The three formed a collective identity, Andrew O'Bonzo, and formed Rich Teaboy Productions as an additional company for music production. O'Brien and his wife released several songs through Rich Teaboy and Druidcast. During this period, O'Brien also wrote The Rocky Horror Show, with informal collaboration of Sinclair and Leighton. Music from the show was published by Druidcast.

At SARM, Sinclair was the producer or co-producer on many of the early recordings, including the first mix of Foreigner's eponymous debut album, and both of The Buggles' studio albums. (While Foreigner was later remixed at Atlantic Records' studios, Sinclair retained the production credit on the album's release.)

In 1970, one of Sinclair's photographs appeared on the cover of the British Journal of Photography.

In the 1990s, he worked with Richmond Shepard to develop and stage a show, Lord Buckley's Finest Hour. It played at New York cabaret Don't Tell Mama.

Later, during his rabbinic career as Yaakov Asher Sinclair, he continued publishing new photography and written content, particularly in his book Seasons of the Moon..

== Rabbinic career ==
In the 1970s, Sinclair read a Yiddish novel, The Shell, that prompted a slow spiritual awakening. However, he remained secular until 1987, when he visited Israel, became enamored of Torah study, and decided to move to Jerusalem. He studied at Yeshiva Ohr Someach and the Mir Yeshiva, both in Jerusalem. He received his rabbinical ordination in 1996.

He became well-known in the Orthodox Jewish community as speaker, holding the plenary or keynote speaker positions at an Agudath Israel convention, and a 2018 Project Inspire event. He regularly lectures in Talmud and philosophy at the Ohr Sameach yeshiva's Tannenbaum College of Jewish Studies.

Sinclair is a photographer and author. His photography book, Seasons of the Moon, is a collector's item, and features his black and white photography, poetry, and essays about the Torah. He has another book on the bible, The Color of Heaven.

== Works ==
- The Color of Heaven - A collection of Torah lessons and inspirational stories.
- Seasons of the Moon - A black-and-white photography book combining poetry and Torah essays.
