= Dreams Money Can Buy =

Dreams Money Can Buy has several uses.

== Music ==
- "Dreams Money Can Buy" (song), on Care Package, compilation album by Drake

Also, used as:

== Film ==
- Dreams That Money Can Buy, 1947 surrealist film by Hans Richter

== Music ==
- Dreams That Money Can't Buy, 1991 album by singer Holly Johnson
