= Hallelujah! (Holly Johnson song) =

Single by Holly Johnson

from the album Soulstream
- Released: 1998
- Genre: Dance
- Label: Pleasuredome
- Songwriter(s): Holly Johnson; Nick Bagnall
- Producer(s): Holly Johnson; Steve Lovell

Holly Johnson singles chronology
"Love and Hate" (1994)	"Hallelujah!" (1998)	"Disco Heaven" (1999)

"Hallelujah!" is a song by former Frankie Goes to Hollywood singer Holly Johnson, which was released in 1998 as a promotional single and included on his third studio album Soulstream (1999). The song was written by Johnson (lyrics and music) and Nick Bagnall (music).

== Background ==
In a 1998 interview, Johnson said of the song's message, "'Hallelujah' is a sort of spiritual, universal love song. It's for the disenfranchised, people who feel they're not able to relate to orthodox religion, but also feel that there is something out there that is positive and good. It's about being grateful and enjoying life."

== Release ==
"Hallelujah!" was the debut release on Johnson's own label Pleasuredome. He recalled in 2010 of the song's release as a promotional-only single, "It was a test to try and learn how to release something on my own label." As a single, "Hallelujah!" was issued as two different 12-inch vinyl releases. The first was subtitled "The First Cut Is the Deepest..." and the second "The Second Cut Is the Neatest...".

"Hallelujah!" debuted at No. 27 on Record Mirror's 'The Club Chart' and No. 30 on 'The Pop Chart' on 24 October 1998. The following week, 31 October, it reached its peak at No. 8 on 'The Club Chart' and No. 14 on 'The Pop Chart'. It was Johnson's biggest UK club hit since his 1989 single "Love Train".

== Critical reception ==
On its release in 1998, Alan Jones of Record Mirror wrote, "Johnson has been very quiet of late, but has now returned with the exceptionally fine - and very retro - 'Hallelujah!'. Guaranteed to put him back into the Top 40, on promo it is initially fastest off the mark in upfront clubs."

In a review of Soulstream, The Guardian wrote, "[Johnson's] new philosophy runs something like: "Radiate light, love power, set free your soul." That's from 'Hallelujah!', whose rather pat optimism resurfaces on 'The Best Invention' and 'All U Need Is Love'. The message would resound more profoundly if it were accompanied by some decent tunes, rather than colourless beats-by-the-yard that do nothing for Johnson's reedy voice." In a retrospective review, Jon O'Brien of AllMusic commented, "The retro stylings are more forgivable when Johnson's distinctive, powerful vocals and life-affirming lyrics are let loose on the dancefloor, with the infectious camp Euro-disco of 'Hallelujah' and 'Disco Heaven'."

== Track listing ==
12-inch promo single #1 (The First Cut Is the Deepest...)

1. "Hallelujah!" (Soundscapers, Jazzed Up Club Mix) - 6:52
2. "Hallelujah!" (Eric Kupper, 12" Pump Mix) - 6:17
3. "Hallelujah!" (Eric Kupper, 12" Pump Mix Dub) - 6:17

12-inch promo single #2 (The Second Cut Is the Neatest...)

1. "Hallelujah!" (Frankie Says... 12" Disco Mix) - 7:10
2. "Hallelujah!" (Frankie Says... 7" Pop Mix) - 4:21
3. "Hallelujah!" (Eric Kupper, 12" Pump Mix) - 6:17
4. "Hallelujah!" (Soundscapers, Jazzed Up Club Mix) - 6:52
