= Europa (Holly Johnson album) =

Studio album by Holly Johnson
- Released: 29 September 2014
- Genre: Synthpop
- Length: 47:36 (original album); 56:00 (deluxe edition); 48:07 (bonus remix CD)
- Label: Pleasuredome
- Producers: Holly Johnson; Mark Ralph (co-producer)

Holly Johnson chronology
Soulstream (1999)	Europa (2014)	Unleashed from the Pleasuredome (2014)

Singles from Europa
- 1. "Follow Your Heart" Released: 27 July 2014; 2. "In and Out of Love" Released: 21 September 2014; 3. "Heaven's Eyes" Released: 18 January 2015; 4. "Dancing with No Fear" Released: 22 June 2015

Europa is the fourth studio album by English singer-songwriter Holly Johnson, released in 2014.

== Background ==
In mid-2014, it was revealed that Johnson would release, Europa, his first studio album in 15 years on his own label Pleasuredome. The singer had hinted at his plans for an album of new material back in 2009 when speaking to Absolute Radio at that year's Q Awards. In 2011, Johnson returned to performing live at the occasional summer festival, mainly in the UK, and in October 2014 he started his first UK solo tour, named after what Johnson described as "the most upbeat song on the Europa album", "Dancing with No Fear". The album was to precede the seven date tour, set for release on 15 September, but was later pushed back to 29 September. The tour, which was Johnson's first since the final Frankie Goes to Hollywood shows in 1987, marked the 30th anniversary of the release of the band's debut album Welcome to the Pleasuredome.

== Composition ==
After meeting producer Mark Ralph in 2012, Johnson began recording new material with him in Paris. Johnson recalled at the time: "I'd forgotten how much physical pleasure I got from singing my own songs. This is my teenage dream come true. I started to think, why did I ever stop? I'd pile my vintage synths into the back of the car, head over to Mark's place, and we'd be up half the night making this record." Europa also features contributions from Roxy Music's Phil Manzanera, Vini Reilly of Durutti Column, Frankie Knuckles and Eric Kupper. Europa initially had the working title of "Do Me a Lemon" – a Cockney rhyming slang for "Do me a favour".

The album was described in an official press release as "a euphoric, often-electronic-led return, celebrating love, dance... and chronicling exactly what Holly Johnson has been up to these last fifteen years." "Follow Your Heart" was described as "about that need to give yourself a push, on an album full of positivity". Johnson admitted: "I really am the archetypal miseryguts. The songs are full of encouragement because really I'm singing to myself, to get rid of that black dog and get me out my shell." The song "You're in My Dreams Tonight" was inspired by one of Johnson's friends who died of an AIDS-related disease in 1991. In the interview with The Guardian, Johnson revealed: "He appeared to me in a dream – he gave me a hug and said: "Everything's going to be all right."

The title track, "Europa", had originally been a collaboration between Johnson and Vangelis in Paris around 1990. Vangelis' team originally approached Johnson and sent him an instrumental track for him to add lyrics to. Johnson soon arrived in Paris and was taken to an underground studio, which had been converted from a concrete bunker on the edge of the Bois de Boulogne. In an interview with The Arts Desk, Johnson recalled: "I sang the vocal and Roman Polanski turned up with a young Emmanuelle Seigner and a posse of choreographers. He said he was going to direct the video and she was going to dance in it. After the weekend had come to a close and I had come back to England, I never heard a peep again about the song from anyone. It was almost like a bit of a dream." Having retained the original recording on DAT, Johnson later rediscovered the song and decided to re-record it: "It took me two years to track Vangelis down. When finally I contacted him it was via Cherry Vanilla. Strangely, she had a company called Europa. I spoke to her and said, "Why is it called that?" She said, "Because I heard that demo many years ago – I love that song." I said, "Well actually this is why I'm ringing you." In the end I got him to play on the version I played with Mark Ralph. I'm very happy with the resulting new version and the fact I got the maestro to play on it."

== Artwork ==
The artwork for Europa is an original painting from Johnson, with the title "United Kingdom After the Rain". It was part of a series of paintings made in 2001–02. Initially Johnson was thinking of what he could show at an exhibition at Studio Voltaire called "Ausgang". This was to commemorate the Golden Jubilee of HRH Queen Elizabeth. Following the release of the Soulstream album, Johnson felt in need to "reset or reboot" himself creatively, and so he started to work alongside the MA students at the Royal College of Art Fine Art Printmaking department. After working on a series of Post Pop Punk QEII prints based on the Cecil Beaton photograph, once used both by Andy Warhol and Jamie Reid, Johnson created the painting at home in acrylic paint, and it ended up as a big oil painting, as well as some lithographic prints. The prints were exhibited at The Royal Academy Summer Show and the oil painting at The Mall Galleries.

The title of the painting references "Europe After The Rain" by Max Ernst, which is a post war apocalyptic landscape. Johnson explained: "Great Britain, with its constant rain and history of war seemed to be dissolving in a miasma of celebrity culture and reality TV: fading, dripping, national identity washed away with globalisation and European directives. As we had all watched, live by satellite, the Twin Towers crumble, the new century was threatening. Dystopian dreams come true, with no off world escape route as depicted in Ridley Scott's Bladerunner." When talking Typography with designer Philip Marshal, Marshal chose to use details of the painting for the cover of Europa.

== Release ==
The album was streamed on The Guardian website on 19 September 2014 and released on 29 September. The album was issued in various formats, and each edition of the album contained different variations on the album's artwork. The regular edition CD was issued in a glossy gatefold softpack with a 12-page booklet, while a limited deluxe edition, autographed by Johnson, was presented in a glossy hardcover CD book-pack and contained two bonus tracks, a bonus remix CD and an exclusive 24-page booklet. Both edition were also issued on vinyl. The regular edition was a double album black-vinyl set in a wide spine outer sleeve with printed inner sleeves, and includes the regular edition CD. The deluxe vinyl was presented as a double album set of transparent red and blue coloured vinyl, in a wide-spine outer sleeve with printed inner sleeves, including the deluxe edition CD of the album, as well as the bonus remix CD. The album was also available to order with a limited edition (of 250) A2 art poster print, hand-numbered and signed by Johnson.

The deluxe edition's two bonus tracks are the original mix of "Europa" and the piano mix of "So Much It Hurts". The bonus remix CD consists of eight tracks, featuring four remixes of "Follow Your Heart" and four of "In and Out of Love".

== Singles ==
In July 2014 the album's lead single "Follow Your Heart" was released. On 20 June 2014 it had its world exclusive first play on Ken Bruce's BBC Radio 2 show. At the end of June the Knuckles and Kupper remix of the song was played for the first time on BBC Radio 6 Music by Nemone. It was also given its online exclusive premiere by XLR8R. The single was made available as a download, as a digital EP, and also as a blue-coloured 12" vinyl, limited to 500, and a promotional, radio-only CD single, featuring a press release sticker. The song features one of the final last remix collaborations by Frankie Knuckles, along with Eric Kupper, before his death in March 2014. In addition to this, Johnson offered a limited batch of 50 test pressings of the 12" vinyl single, autographed and hand numbered, on his website.

In early September 2014 the second single "In and Out of Love" was released. It received its world premiere play on Ken Bruce's BBC Radio 2 show on 15 August, played by Michael Ball who was sitting in for Bruce. It was also given its online premiere via Attitude.co.uk. The single's artwork, like the album, features an original painting by Johnson. The song was given a digital release, and also as a promotional, radio-only CD single. One remix of the song is by Phil Harding, who had remixed Johnson's "Americanos" song in 1989. The music video for "In and Out of Love" was shot in mid-July, and was directed by Chris Shepherd, and produced by Alex Bedford.

The third single, "Heaven's Eyes", was released digitally on 18 January 2015. The single featured a "Radio Edit" version of the song, as well as five different remixes. An official lyric video was uploaded onto YouTube on 26 November 2014. It was produced by Simon Lowery with images supplied by the European Organisation for Astronomical Research.

A fourth single from the album, "Dancing with No Fear", was released on 22 June 2015.

== Promotion ==
On 27 July 2014 Johnson appeared on the BBC Radio 2 show Madeley on Sunday – as Richard Madeley sat in for Terry Wogan. Aside from an interview, Johnson performed a stripped-down version of "Follow Your Heart" and his 1989 hit "Americanos".

Johnson made a special in-store performance at Rough Trade East in London on 1 October.

Following the "Dancing with No Fear" tour in October, Johnson released his first live album in December 2014, titled Unleashed From the Pleasuredome. The album was recorded at the Koko in London on 28 October 2014. Of the nineteen tracks, six are taken from Europa.

Johnson performed at a further set of six shows, three UK dates in June 2015, and European dates in August. The shows celebrated the release of the album's fourth single "Dancing with No Fear".

== Critical reception ==
Professional ratings
Review scores
Source	Rating
AllMusic	4/5 stars
Q	4/5 stars
Record Collector	4/5 stars
musicOMH	3/5 stars
Mojo	3/5 stars

Upon release, David Jeffries of AllMusic described the album as a "noble return". He commented: "Johnson's voice is still the wonderful combination of big and warm that it's always been, while his songwriting is still a mix of fascinated, strong-willed, and wise. Being right-sized with no filler means the album is a fan-pleasing effort that can still welcome newcomers." In addition, the tracks "Follow Your Heart", "In and Out of Love", "So Much It Hurts", "Europa" and "You're in My Dreams Tonight" were all highlighted as AMG Pick Tracks. David Quantick of Q commented: "Johnson has returned to pop with an album that reflects the best moments of his solo debut, Blast, and adds a new-found optimism."

Terry Staunton of Record Collector considered Europa to be a "fine album", with Johnson "in tremendous voice on a series of uplifting songs that sparkle with electronica dance rhythms without forgetting to add attractive, engaging melodies". He summarised the album as "pristine, elegant, commercial pop, delivered with great verve" and a "triumphant return for one of pop's most charismatic figures". Mojo considered the album "electro-gliding mirrorball pop" that "comes in optimistic hues". Sam Shepherd of musicOMH felt the album was made up of "mid '90s synth pop and cheesy house", which without Johnson's presence, could "easily be written off as half-baked synth pop". He concluded: "Thankfully there are a few moments, like the impassioned "You're in My Dreams Tonight" that possess real passion, proving, as if proof were needed, that Holly Johnson is still a quite breathtaking vocalist. This album just doesn't provide the musical support that he deserves."

== Track listing ==
No.	Title	Writer(s)	Length
1.	"Follow Your Heart"	Holly Johnson	6:22
2.	"In and Out of Love"	Johnson	3:24
3.	"Heaven's Eyes"	Johnson	4:26
4.	"So Much It Hurts"	Johnson	4:02
5.	"Dancing with No Fear"	Johnson	4:09
6.	"Europa"	Johnson, Vangelis	4:28
7.	"Glorious"	Johnson, Vini Reilly	4:08
8.	"Hold on Tight"	Johnson	3:58
9.	"Lonesome Town"	Johnson	4:03
10.	"You're in My Dreams Tonight"	Johnson	4:00
11.	"The Sun Will Shine Again"	Johnson	4:31

Deluxe edition bonus tracks
No.	Title	Length
12.	"Europa" (Original Mix)	4:22
13.	"So Much It Hurts" (Piano Mix)	4:01

iTunes bonus track version
No.	Title	Length
12.	"Europa" (Club Ralph Mix)	4:22
13.	"Glorious" (Demo Version)	3:09

Remixes CD – limited edition
No.	Title	Length
1.	"Follow Your Heart" (Extended Version)	7:02
2.	"Follow Your Heart" (Frankie Knuckles & Eric Kupper's Director's Cut Signature Mix)	7:36
3.	"Follow Your Heart" (Hard Ton Instrumental Mix)	5:38
4.	"Follow Your Heart" (Clique Unlimited Orchestra Dub Mix)	9:14
5.	"In and Out of Love" (Phil Harding & PJS Radio Edit)	3:19
6.	"In and Out of Love" (Douze Feeling Dub)	6:13
7.	"In and Out of Love" (Rich B & Phil Marriott Remix Radio Edit)	3:33
8.	"In and Out of Love" (Clique Unlimited Orchestra Dub Mix)	5:28

== Personnel ==
- Holly Johnson – lead vocals (all tracks), backing vocals (tracks 2–11), producer (all tracks), omnichord (tracks 1, 7, 9), percussion (tracks 1, 4), synth bass, guitar solo (track 3), tremolo guitar, Hammond organ (track 4), EMS Synthi AKS, electric piano (track 5), synth(s) (track 8–11), bass (tracks 8, 10), accordion (track 9), theremin (track 11)
- Mark Ralph (at Club Ralph) – co-producer (all tracks), engineering (all tracks), keyboard programming (tracks 3–11), keyboards (track 1), electric rhythm guitar (track 2), electronic drum programming (track 10), synthesizer, theremin (track 11)
- Andrew Levy – slap bass guitar (track 1), middle eight bass guitar (track 2), bass guitar (tracks 5, 9, 11), bass solo (track 6)
- Geoff Holroyde – drums (all tracks)
- Scott Ralph – brass (tracks 1–2, 4–6, 8, 10), percussion (tracks 6, 10)
- Johnny Willett – guitar (track 1)
- Claudia Fontaine, Derek Green and Beverly Skeete – backing vocals (track 1)
- Tim Hunt – recording at Matrix Studios of backing vocals and guitar (track 1)
- Juliet Roberts – backing vocals (tracks 2–3, 5, 7, 11)
- Phil Manzanera – additional guitar (tracks 2–6, 8–9, 11)
- Mike Boddy – engineering of additional guitar at The Gallery (tracks 2–6, 8–9, 11)
- Javier – assistant engineer of additional guitar at The Gallery (tracks 2–6, 8–9, 11)
- Fiona Brice – violin (tracks 2, 6, 10–11)
- Vicky Mathews – cello (tracks 2, 6, 10–11)
- Clifford Slapper – piano (tracks 4, 9)
- Stuart Kennedy – orchestration (track 4)
- Philippe Colonna – additional engineer, mixing (at Studio Omega, Paris) (track 6)
- Guillaume Gautier – assistant engineer (at Studio Omega, Paris) (track 6)
- Vangelis – additional keyboards, sound effects, mixing (track 6)
- Karl Sunderland – backing vocals (track 6)
- Vini Reilly – guitar (track 7)
- Ian Cooper – mastering of 12" mixes of "Follow Your Heart"
- Eric Kupper, Mauro, Max of Hard Ton, Tim Burgess – remixing
- Laura Metaxa, Cherry Vanilla, Philippe Colonna, Evangelos Kalafatis – Greek chorus of assistants of Vangelis
- Dick Beetham – mastering (at 360 Mastering)

=== Additional personnel ===
- Wolfgang Kuhle – management
- Alan Lander at Bray and Krais – legal advice
- Kevin Davies, Clare Muller – photography
- Mark McQuillan at Republic of Music – sales and distribution
- Matt Dixon of Band2Market – management and marketing
- Joe Bennett at JBPR – national radio
- Steve Tandy, Commedia Team – regional radio
- Rob Chute and Peter Hall at Partisan PR – national PR
- Gordon Duncan at APB – regional PR
- Sam Wright and Jess Brandon at Seesaw – TV
- Dave Kendrick and Motive Unknown – online
- Your Army – club

== Chart performance ==
Chart (2014)	Peak position
UK Independent Albums Chart	13
UK Albums Chart	63
