= Love Train (disambiguation) =

"Love Train" is a 1972 song by the O'Jays.

Love Train may also refer to:

- "Love Train" (Holly Johnson song), 1989
- "Love Train" (Wolfmother song), 2006
- "Love Train", a song by Kylie Minogue from his 2023 album Tension
- "Love Train", a song by Meek Mill from his 2021 album Expensive Pain
- "Love Train", a song by S Club 7 from their 2000 album 7

== See also ==
- "Love's Train", a 1982 song by Con Funk Shun
- Love Train – The Philly Album, an album by Sonia
- The Love Train, an EP by Meghan Trainor
