= Disco Heaven =

Single by Holly Johnson

from the album Soulstream
- Released: 6 September 1999
- Genre: Pop
- Length: 4:16
- Label: Pleasuredome
- Songwriter(s): Holly Johnson
- Producer(s): Holly Johnson

Holly Johnson singles chronology
| "Hallelujah!" (1998) | "Disco Heaven" (1999) | "The Power of Love" (1999) |

"Disco Heaven" is a song from former Frankie Goes to Hollywood singer Holly Johnson, which was released in 1999 as the second single from his third studio album Soulstream. The song, written and produced by Johnson, reached No. 85 in the UK Singles Chart.

== Background ==
"Disco Heaven" is a song about the friends Johnson had lost to AIDS. Johnson told The Guardian in 1999, "It's a song about remembering in a positive way your friends that aren't here any more. You know they're all there dancing together in disco heaven."

== Music video ==
The song's music video was Johnson's directorial debut and his first video since 1994's "Legendary Children". The video features cameo appearances from Boy George as the ghost of Leigh Bowery, Jasper Conran as the late American designer Halston, Angie Brown (the song's backing vocalist) as herself, Jibby Bean as herself, Win Austin as Grace Jones, Trademark as Andy Warhol, Nicola Bowery Roy as Sylvester, Pinkietessa and Golden Boy. Dancers in the video included Faustos Danese, Charles Sebunya, Roberto Saraceno, Laura Hills, Melody Woodhead and Bev Jones. The video's choreography was handled by Les Child, who was assisted by Mark Tyme.

Speaking of the video to the Sunday Tribune in 1999, Johnson said, "The video tries to recapture the feel of the Studio 54 disco days and it's about all the people of that generation who are now having a disco together in heaven." In 2010, Johnson said of his experience directing the video, "I loved it but it was exhausting, after producing the record, I was trying to promote it, release it, direct the video, it was all a bit too much for one person."

== Critical reception ==
In a review of Soulstream, Caroline Sullivan of The Guardian noted, "By default, the best tracks are the campest: the nostalgic 'Disco Heaven' and 'Legendary Children'." Jon O'Brien of AllMusic retrospectively wrote, "The retro stylings are more forgivable when Johnson's distinctive, powerful vocals and life-affirming lyrics are let loose on the dancefloor, with the infectious camp Euro-disco of "Hallelujah" and "Disco Heaven," the latter a joyous lament to the friends he lost to AIDS, and impossible to resist."

== Track listing ==
12" single

1. "Disco Heaven (Wayne G's Heaven Mix)" - 7:03
2. "Disco Heaven (Sicario Club Mix)" - 7:10
3. "Disco Heaven (Frankie Says... Edit)" - 6:23
4. "Disco Heaven (7" Version)" - 4:12

CD single

1. "Disco Heaven (Sicario Club Mix Edit)" - 4:15
2. "Disco Heaven (Daz & Andy's Heavenly Remix)" - 6:59
3. "Disco Heaven (Sicario Club Mix)" - 7:12

CD single

1. "Disco Heaven (Sicario Club Mix Edit)" - 4:15
2. "Disco Heaven (Frankie Says... Edit)" - 6:23
3. "Disco Heaven (Wayne G's Heaven Mix)" - 7:03
4. "Disco Heaven (Sicario Club Mix)" - 7:12

CD single (UK promo)

1. "Disco Heaven (Wayne G's Heaven Mix)" - 7:03
2. "Disco Heaven (Sicario Club Mix)" - 7:10
3. "Disco Heaven (Frankie Says... Edit)" - 6:23
4. "Disco Heaven (7" Version)" - 4:12
5. "Disco Heaven (Sicario Club Mix Edit)" - 4:15

== Personnel ==
- Holly Johnson - lead vocals, producer, engineer, artwork
- Angie Brown - backing vocals
- Gavin Landless, Mark Tucker, Simon Wilde - engineers
- Mike "Spike" Drake - mixing, production assistance
- Chris Toole - programming
- Nick Ingman - strings arrangement, strings conductor

== Charts ==
| Chart (1999) | Peak position |
|---|---|
| UK Singles Chart | 85 |
