= Love & Hate (Ryuichi Sakamoto song) =

"Love and Hate"

Single by Ryuichi Sakamoto featuring Holly Johnson

from the album Sweet Revenge
- Released: 1994
- Genre: Pop
- Length: 3:36
- Label: Elektra / WEA
- Songwriter(s): Holly Johnson; Ryuichi Sakamoto
- Producer(s): Holly Johnson

Holly Johnson singles chronology
"Legendary Children (All of Them Queer)" (1994)	"Love and Hate" (1994)	"Hallelujah!" (1998)

"Love and Hate" is a song by Japanese musician and actor Ryuichi Sakamoto featuring the former Frankie Goes to Hollywood singer Holly Johnson on vocals. Released as a single in 1994 by Elektra and WEA, from Sakamoto's eight solo album, Sweet Revenge (1994), the song was written by Sakamoto and Johnson. It reached No. 97 in the UK charts.

A music video was filmed to promote the single. Johnson came to work with Sakamoto due to his links with Frankie Goes to Hollywood's manager, Bob Johnson, who, at the time, was the manager of Roddy Frame, a friend of Sakamoto.

== Critical reception ==
Upon its release as a single, Simon Williams of NME wrote, "Sadly, Ryuichi — Mr 'Merry Christmas' himself — is unable to help. Firstly because this is a woeful wander wherein guest howler Holly Johnson makes out like Vincent Price. Secondly because this is a song about all the really really bad things in the world, a theme which fits none too easily with the sleeve shots of Ryuichi dressed as Sesame Street's Big Bird." Gareth Grundy from Select said "that link-up with Holly results in a murky anti-bigotry rant."

== Track listing ==
- 12" single
1. "Love & Hate (Extended Mix)" - 5:31
2. "Love & Hate (NYC Personal Mix)" - 5:18
3. "Love & Hate (Edit)" - 4:10
4. "Love & Hate (Love Mix)" - 7:10
5. "Love & Hate (Hate Mix)" - 7:19
- 12" single (UK promo)
1. "Love & Hate (Love Mix)" - 7:10
2. "Love & Hate (Hate Mix)" - 7:19
3. "Love & Hate (Extended Mix)" - 5:31
4. "Love & Hate (NYC Personal Mix)" - 5:18
- 12" single (American promo)
1. "Love and Hate (Hate Mix)" - 7:19
2. "Love and Hate (Message Mix-Single Edit)" - 4:10
3. "Love and Hate (Love Mix)" - 7:10
4. "Love and Hate (NYC Personal Mix)" - 5:18
- CD single
1. "Love & Hate (Edit)" - 3:36
2. "Love & Hate (Love Mix)" - 7:10
3. "Love & Hate (Hate Mix)" - 7:19
4. "Love and Hate (NYC Personal Mix)" - 5:18
5. "Love & Hate (Extended Mix)" - 5:31
- CD single (European Limited Edition Digipack release)
1. "Love & Hate (Edit)" - 3:36
2. "Love & Hate (Love Mix)" - 7:10
3. "Love & Hate (Hate Mix)" - 7:19
4. "Love and Hate (NYC Personal Mix)" - 5:18
5. "Love & Hate (Extended Mix)" - 5:31

== Charts ==
Chart (1994)	Peak position
UK Singles (OCC)	97

== Remixes ==
- "Love & Hate" (Edit)
- "Love & Hate" (Love mix)
- "Love & Hate" (Hate mix)
- "Love & Hate" (NYC Personal mix)
- "Love & Hate" (Extended mix)
- "Love & Hate" (Message Mix-single edit)
- "Love & Hate" (Butterfly of Digable Planets mix)
- "Love & Hate" (Marshall Jefferson mix)
- "Love & Hate" (Album mix)
