= Across the Universe (Holly Johnson song) =

Single by Holly Johnson

from the album Dreams That Money Can't Buy
- B-side: "Funky Paradise"
- Released: 4 March 1991 (UK); 2 April 1991 (Europe)
- Genre: Pop
- Length: 3:56
- Label: MCA
- Songwriter(s): Holly Johnson
- Producer(s): Andy Richards

Holly Johnson singles chronology
"Where Has Love Gone?" (1990)	"Across the Universe" (1991)	"The People Want to Dance" (1991)

"Across the Universe" is a song by British singer-songwriter Holly Johnson, which was released in 1991 as the second single from his second studio album Dreams That Money Can't Buy. The song was written by Johnson and produced by Andy Richards. "Across the Universe" reached No. 99 in the UK Singles Chart. The single was released with the non-LP track "Funky Paradise" as the B-side.

== Background ==
In 1991, Johnson spoke of the meaning behind the song, "This is about a man living in [the] modern day who gets pissed off with the factories and the cars and the pollution, and wants to take a holiday in outer space. It's ecological space escape. Very camp." He also told Melody Maker in 1991, "That's me completely pissed off with the planet and the city and just wanting to get away. There's nowhere to go because the sea's polluted in Italy, you can't go to Greece 'cause there's shit all over the beach, so you know it's holidays in space."

== Critical reception ==
On its release as a single, Robin Smith of Record Mirror wrote, "Not warp factor five. More like a damp rocket on Guy Fawkes night. Our Holly does his best with this rather tatty tune but it still chugs along like a trip to Batley on a wet day in November. Abort this mission." Andrew Collins of New Musical Express described it as "disgusting hogwash" and added, "Starts with a wolf-howl and then descends into galactic camp that has none of Betty Boo's appeal, but all of her ideas (that's both of them)." Soho, as guest reviewers for the magazine, were more positive in their review. Jacqueline Cuff remarked, "I like him, he's such a brilliant performer. This is everything it should be. The kids'll love it." Tim London stated, "It's great! Listen to them old-fashioned Syndrums!" Peter Kinghorn of the Newcastle Evening Chronicle described it as an "odd blend of all action tune and mostly laidback vocal".

In a review of Dreams That Money Can't Buy, Select considered the song a successful example of Johnson "adequately translat[ing] the maximum stomp of classic hi-NRG into '90s pop". They described the song as "a self-explanatory crazy acid whirl in space with much silliness and bucketfuls of Holly's adorable camp naffness." In a 2011 review of the album, Terry Staunton of Record Collector considered "Where Has Love Gone?" and "Across the Universe" as "half-formed synth dance workouts" and their "elevation to single status baffling".

== Track listing ==
7-inch single

1. "Across the Universe" - 3:59
2. "Funky Paradise " - 4:13

12-inch single

1. "Across The Universe (Space-A-Go-Go Mix)" - 6:32
2. "Across the Universe" - 3:59
3. "Funky Paradise " - 4:13

12-inch single (UK promo)

1. "Across The Universe (Space-A-Go-Go Mix)" - 6:32
2. "Across The Universe (Space-A-Go-Go Instrumental Mix)" - 6:38

Cassette single

1. "Across The Universe" - 3:59
2. "Funky Paradise " - 4:13
3. "Across The Universe" - 3:59
4. "Funky Paradise " - 4:13

CD single

1. "Across the Universe" - 3:59
2. "Across The Universe (Space-A-Go-Go Mix)" - 6:39
3. "Funky Paradise " - 4:15

== Charts ==
Chart (1991)	Peak position
UK Singles Chart	99
