= Where Has Love Gone? (song) =

Single by Holly Johnson

from the album Dreams That Money Can't Buy
- B-side: "Perfume (Aromatherapy Mix)"
- Released: 12 November 1990
- Recorded: 1990
- Genre: Pop
- Length: 4:18
- Label: MCA Records
- Songwriter: Holly Johnson
- Producer: Andy Richards

Holly Johnson singles chronology
"Heaven's Here" (1989)	"Where Has Love Gone?" (1990)	"Across the Universe" (1991)

"Where Has Love Gone?" is a song by British singer-songwriter Holly Johnson, released in 1990 as the lead single from his second studio album Dreams That Money Can't Buy (1991). The song was written by Johnson and produced by Andy Richards.

== Background ==
Released as the lead single from the Dreams That Money Can't Buy album, the single only peaked at #73 in the UK for a total of two weeks. Around the time of the release, Johnson's relations with MCA had declined after Johnson had discovered that no promotion budget has been set for his new album.

The song contains backing vocals from both Don Snow and Stevie Lange.

Johnson has described "Where Has Love Gone" as being about "the death of love in the face of technological advancement and the change in values in the 20th century". In a 1991 interview with Melody Maker, Johnson added, "Technology should be used in a positive way rather than a negative and destructive way. Rather than using money and resources to create another Patriot missile, we should use technology to lighten people's load and sort out Third World problems, homelessness, poverty and drug addiction."

== Release ==
The single was released on 7" vinyl, 12" vinyl, CD and cassette in 1990 across the UK and Germany. The single was released entirely through MCA Records.

The 7" vinyl and cassette versions of the single featured the a-side along with the b-side "Perfume (Aromatherapy Mix)". The 12" vinyl replaced the a-side with the Julian Mendelsohn remix "Where Has Love Gone (The Search For Love Mix)". A remixed 12" vinyl was also released in the UK only, featuring two remixes by G.T.O., which was "Where Has Love Gone? (G.T.O. Mix)" and "Where Has Love Gone? (Dreaming Mix)". This release featured altered artwork, whilst still maintaining the basis of the main artwork's design. The CD version featured the album/7" vinyl version of the a-side, the b-side and the "Where Has Love Gone (The Search For Love Mix)".

The single's b-side "Perfume (Aromatherapy Mix)" had originally appeared on the 1989 remix album Hollelujah.

== Promotion ==
A music video was created for the single, which featured shots of Johnson performing the song, amongst other clips of various characters and scenes, mainly focusing on different scenes in a playground-like area, with the scene focusing on one or two children each time.

The video was aired on MTV.

The song was also performed along with the 1989 hit song "Americanos" at the Diamond Record Awards in 1991, where Johnson received a Diamond Record award for "Americanos". For his performance, Johnson wore the same outfit as from the "Where Has Love Gone" music video. The Diamond Record award was for the sale of ten million units of the single through legal distribution sources.

== Critical reception ==
Upon its release, Steve Stewart of the Press and Journal wrote, "The question should be: Where has your talent gone? Bland, familiar-sounding stuff. The last thing HJ should be doing is relax!" In a review of the 12-inch single, Garry Grossing of Record Mirror stated, "Listening to the 12-inch means that your ears have to wade through 10 minutes of what sounds like someone hitting a pillow with a mallet, before Johnson honours us with his vocal presence. Ironically, his first words are 'Quality's gone out of style'. I couldn't agree more and as for the whereabouts of love, well there wasn't much lavished on this."

David Stubbs of Melody Maker commented, "Holly's voice is largely lost in an old-fashioned House remix, listening to those routine sequencer patterns is like driving at high speed through the Blackwall Tunnel." Edwin Pouncey of New Musical Express considered it "quite a change of direction" from Johnson's "past puny but admittedly enjoyable efforts" and noted the "almost Kraftwerk-styled rhythm" which "steam roller[s] along without interruption". He concluded, "If I was a dancing dervish kinda guy I just might be tempted to put my back out of joint to this."

In a retrospective review of Dreams That Money Can't Buy, Jon O'Brien of AllMusic wrote: "Not exactly helped by [the] game show theme-style production, all synthetic brass, spacy bleeps, and tinny beats, the likes of "Where Has Love Gone?" and "Do It for Love" sound like Erasure B-sides." Terry Staunton of Record Collector stated: "Both "Across the Universe" and "Where Has Love Gone?" come across as half-formed synth dance workouts, their elevation to single status baffling."

== Track listing ==
7" Single

1. "Where Has Love Gone?" - 4:20
2. "Perfume (Aromatherapy Mix)" - 5:54

12" Single

1. "Where Has Love Gone (The Search For Love Mix)" - 7:21
2. "Perfume (Aromatherapy Mix)" - 5:56

12" Remix Single

1. "Where Has Love Gone? (G.T.O. Mix)" - 6:35
2. "Where Has Love Gone? (Dreaming Mix)" - 4:21

12" Remix Single (UK promo)

1. "Where Has Love Gone? (G.T.O. Mix)" - 6:34
2. "Where Has Love Gone? (Dreaming Mix)" - 4:20

CD Single

1. "Where Has Love Gone?" - 4:20
2. "Perfume (Aromatherapy Mix)" - 5:56
3. "Where Has Love Gone (The Search For Love Mix)" - 7:29

Cassette Single

1. "Where Has Love Gone?" - 4:20
2. "Perfume (Aromatherapy Mix)" - 5:54

== Charts ==
Chart performance for "Where Has Love Gone?"
Chart (1990/91)	Peak position
Australia (ARIA)	147
UK Singles Chart	73

== Remixes and B-sides ==
- "Perfume" (Aromatherapy Mix)
- "Where Has Love Gone?" (The Search for Love Mix)
- "Where Has Love Gone?" (Dreaming Mix)
- "Where Has Love Gone?" (G.T.O. Mix)

== Personnel ==
Where Has Love Gone?

- Holly Johnson - vocals, keyboard programming, additional programming, executive producer
- Don Snow, Stevie Lange - backing vocals
- Andy Richards - producer
- Mike 'Spike' Drake - engineer

Remixes

- Julian Mendelsohn - remixer and additional programming on "(The Search For Love Mix)"
- G.T.O. - remixers on "(G.T.O. Mix)" and "(Dreaming Mix)"

Perfume (Aromatherapy Mix)

- Dan Hartman - producer
- Madame X - remixers, remix programming
- Martin Phillips - remixers, remix programming, remix engineer
- Nigel Green, Tony Phillips - engineer

Other

- Me Company - sleeve design
- Richard Houghton - photography
