= Sweet Revenge (Ryuichi Sakamoto album) =

Studio album by Ryuichi Sakamoto
- Released: 17 June 1994
- Studios: 11-K Studios, Clindton Studios, Unique Studios, Skyline Studios, Right Track Studios; (New York City); Paradise Studios, Sedic Studios; (Tokyo); Metropolis Studios, Westside Studios; (London)
- Genres: Downtempo; trip hop; chillout
- Length: 60:26 (Japanese version); 51:29 (international version)
- Labels: Güt / For Life Music (Japan); Elektra (US)
- Producer: Ryuichi Sakamoto

Ryuichi Sakamoto chronology
Little Buddha (1994)	Sweet Revenge (1994)	Smoochy (1995)

Professional ratings
Review scores
Source	Rating
AllMusic	3.5/5 stars
NME	5/10
Select	3/5 medals

Sweet Revenge is a 1994 album by Ryuichi Sakamoto. The Japanese and international releases have different track listings, with the international pressing featuring (uncredited) re-mixes of half of the songs. The title track is an instrumental piece originally composed for the soundtrack of Bernardo Bertolucci's Little Buddha.

A re-recording of "Psychedelic Afternoon", featuring original lyricist David Byrne on vocals and sporting modified lyrics, was released in 2013 as a way to raise money and awareness for children who survived the 2011 Tōhoku earthquake and tsunami. An animated music video was released concurrently with the new version.

The album includes other collaborations, with Amedeo Pace, Holly Johnson and Roddy Frame, among others.

== Track listing ==
All music is composed by Ryuichi Sakamoto.

Japanese version
No.	Title	Writer(s)	Length
1.	"Tokyo Story"		1:16
2.	"Moving On"	J-Me	5:45
3.	"二人の果て" (Futari no hate, "The two people have split up")	Taeko Ohnuki	5:56
4.	"Regret"	J-Me	5:38
5.	"Pounding At My Heart"	Paul Alexander	5:32
6.	"Love and Hate"	Holly Johnson	5:27
7.	"Sweet Revenge"		4:07
8.	"7 Seconds"	J-Me	3:33
9.	"Anna"		4:47
10.	"Same Dream, Same Destination"	Roddy Frame	4:04
11.	"Psychedelic Afternoon"	David Byrne	4:10
12.	"Interruptions"	Latasha Natasha Diggs	4:51
13.	"君と僕と彼女のこと" (Kimi to boku to kanojo no koto, "You and me and that girl")	Taeko Ohnuki	5:20
Total length:			60:26

International version
No.	Title	Writer(s)	Length
1.	"Tokyo Story"		1:16
2.	"Moving On" (different mix)	J-Me	5:45
3.	"Sentimental" (English language version of "二人の果て")	Vivien Goldman	5:56
4.	"Regret" (different mix)	J-Me	5:38
5.	"Pounding At My Heart" (different mix)	Paul Alexander	5:32
6.	"Love and Hate"	Holly Johnson	5:27
7.	"Sweet Revenge"		4:07
8.	"7 Seconds"	J-Me	3:33
9.	"Same Dream, Same Destination" (different mix)	Roddy Frame	4:04
10.	"Interruptions" (different mix)	Latasha Natasha Diggs	4:51
11.	"Water's Edge" (English language version of "君と僕と彼女のこと", different mix)	Vivien Goldman	5:20
Total length:			51:29

== Personnel ==
- Ryuichi Sakamoto – keyboards, programming, percussion, vocals
- J-Me – vocals
- Vivian Sessoms – vocals
- Holly Johnson – vocals
- Latasha Natasha Diggs – vocals
- Paul Alexander – vocals
- Arto Lindsay – vocals
- Roddy Frame – vocals
- Miki Imai – vocals
- Towa Tei – programming
- Satoshi Tomiie – programming and arrangements
- Cyro Baptista – percussion
- Amadeo Pace – guitar
- David Nadien – string section leader
- Lawrence Feldman – bass clarinet
- Romero Lubambo – guitar
- Hiroshi Takano – guitar
- Jean-Baptiste Mondino – photography

== Reception ==
The Rough Guide to Rock wrote that the album "moved his post-Tangerine Dream electro-chamber music into the corporate soul realm of Soul II Soul and M People."

== Remix album ==
A remix album, titled Hard Revenge, was released in December 1994.

== Tour and live album ==
The album was followed by a live tour "Sweet Revenge Tour", resulting in a live album, Sweet Revenge Tour 94, released in January 1995.
