= Sarm Studios =

Recording studio in London, England

- Location: Notting Hill, London, England
- Coordinates: 51.5163°N 0.0700°W
- Owner: SPZ Group
- Affiliations: Companies within the building: ZTT Records; Stiff Records; Perfect Songs; Unforgettable Songs; Blacklist Entertainment; TCP International
- Website: sarmstudios.com

Sarm Studios is an independent recording studio in London, England. Originally founded in east London in 1973, the studio's original location was renamed Sarm East Studios in 1982 when Jill Sinclair and Trevor Horn purchased Basing Street Studios from Island Records and renamed it Sarm West Studios. Sarm Studios original locations were eventually succeeded by the Sarm Music Village complex.

== History ==
=== Sarm East (1973–2001) ===
Sarm Studios was founded at 9-13 Osborn Street in Aldgate, in the building formerly occupied by the City of London Recording Studios, which recorded radio programmes and narration for newsreels from 1960 until going out of business in 1972. Shortly thereafter, Gary Lyons and Barry Ainsworth, two recording engineers who had been operating a tape copying service called Sound and Recording Mobiles, purchased the facility with financial backing from businessman David Sinclair and named it using an acronym of their business name, opening SARM in July 1973. Ainsworth left the business in 1975, replaced by ex-Trident Studios engineer Mike Stone. David Sinclair's son and daughter, John and Jill, later became co-directors at the studio.

In 1975, Queen recorded sections of "Bohemian Rhapsody" and "The Prophet's Song" at Sarm Studios, and filmed the video for "Somebody to Love" at the studio the following year. The band returned to Sarm Studios in summer 1977 to record portions of their album News of the World, including the hit song "We Are the Champions."

In the mid-1970s, Sarm was one of the first 24-track recording studios in England; it later became the first with 48-track facilities. Sarm's outboard equipment included an Eventide H910 Harmonizer, Lexicon 224 digital reverb, UREI 1176 compressors, and AMS digital delay.

In 1978, Sarm Studios suffered extensive water damage and underwent a major renovation, including a control room redesign and the largest Trident TSM console built to date, with Allison automation system. At the same time, the 3M and MCI multitrack tape machines were replaced by a pair of Studer A80s (to be replaced later by Studer A800 Mk IIIs) with Dolby A. In 1982, Sarm's East London studio was one of the first in London to install an early Solid State Logic 4000E mixing console.

Producer Trevor Horn became a frequent client at Sarm Studios, and he and Jill Sinclair married in 1980. In 1982, Sinclair and Horn founded ZTT Records and purchased Island Studios on Basing Street, rebranding it Sarm West and the original Sarm Studio as Sarm East.

Sarm East closed in 2001.

=== Sarm West Coast (1981–2017) ===
In 1981, Sarm opened Sarm West Coast, a residential studio in Bel Air, Los Angeles; in late 2017, it was destroyed in the Skirball Fire.

=== Sarm West (1982–2013) ===
In 1982, Horn and Sinclair bought Island Records' Basing Street Studios in West London, renaming Sarm's original East London location Sarm East and their new West London acquisition Sarm West. Horn and Sinclair also established offices at Sarm West's Basing Street location for the ZTT Records and Stiff Records labels, as well as the Perfect Songs and Unforgettable Songs publishing companies.

In November 1984, Studio 1 at Sarm West was the venue for the recording of "Do They Know It's Christmas?" by the members of Band Aid in support of relief efforts for the 1984–1985 famine in Ethiopia, and in November 2014, the studios were used to record the Band Aid 30 charity single.

In 1987, the studio's cathedral organ was recorded for George Michael's album Faith.

In May 2011, two new studios and music business offices were added. The redesign also included living accommodation, to facilitate a return to the studios' 1970s policy of long-term bookings. The studios became part of SPZ Group, a holding company belonging to Sinclair and Horn.

Sarm closed the Sarm West Studios on Basing Street in 2013, and the former church building that housed the studios was converted into luxury flats in 2018.

=== Sarm Music Village (2013–present) ===
In 2013, SPZ Group opened the Sarm Music Village 6-studio complex in Ladbroke Grove before closing the Sarm West Studios on Basing Street.

On 12 July 2022 it was announced that Sarm Music Village Inc. was acquired by Three Six Zero for an estimated $5.3m USD. Three Six Zero CEO Mark Gillespie also founded the label Three Six Zero Recording, now headquartered at Sarm Studios.
