= Soulstream (Holly Johnson album) =

Studio album by Holly Johnson
- Released: 11 October 1999
- Genre: Dance
- Length: 52:46
- Label: Pleasuredome
- Producer: Holly Johnson, Steve Lovell

Holly Johnson chronology
Dreams That Money Can't Buy (1991)	Soulstream (1999)	Europa (2014)

Soulstream is the third studio album by British singer-songwriter Holly Johnson, which was released in 1999 on Johnson's own label, Pleasuredome. The album, which was recorded at Johnson's own home studio, contains a re-working of his hit song with Frankie Goes to Hollywood, "The Power of Love", as well as a re-working of his 1994 single "Legendary Children (All of Them Queer)".

In 2010, Johnson picked "Soulstream" as his favourite track from the album. The album's title came from a quote from Stevie, a film about the poet, played by Glenda Jackson.

Three singles were released from the album. "Disco Heaven" reached No. 85 on the UK Singles Chart and "The Power of Love" reached No. 56. The previous year, in 1998, "Hallelujah!" was also released as a promotional only single.

Speaking to the Liverpool Echo in 1999, Johnson said of the album: "I definitely had a creative urge to fulfil. I had written a book and was producing art, but I was still writing songs as well. Now, though, it's harder because I run my own record label as well as the music. I really hope people like this record but, if they don't, tough."

== Critical reception ==
Professional ratings
Review scores
Source	Rating
AllMusic	2.5/5 stars
The Guardian	3/5 stars

On its release, Caroline Sullivan of The Guardian noted the album's "decidedly spiritual bent", with some of the songs containing a "rather pat optimism". She added: "The message would resound more profoundly if it were accompanied by some decent tunes, rather than colourless beats-by-the-yard that do nothing for Johnson's reedy voice." Sullivan picked "Disco Heaven" and "Legendary Children" as the album's two best tracks.

In a retrospective review, Jon O'Brien of AllMusic wrote: "Soulstream isn't without its charms, but after such a lengthy absence, Johnson needed to recapture the glorious pop spirit of his previous outfit if he was to make any impression on a chart scene vastly different from when he left it, something its clichéd and disappointingly bland sound resolutely failed to do." He noted the "infectious camp Euro-disco" of both "Hallelujah" and "Disco Heaven" but felt most of the songs sounded "at least five years out of date".

== Track listing ==
=== Original release ===
All songs written by Holly Johnson except where noted.

1. "Lady Luck" – 4:20
2. "Soulstream" – 5:05
3. "Disco Heaven" (Sicario Club Mix Radio Edit) – 4:15
4. "Don't Give Up" – 4:15
5. "Hope" – 4:52
6. "The Best Invention" – 4:31
7. "Hallelujah!" (Eric Kupper Radio Mix) (Holly Johnson, Nick Bagnall) – 3:58
8. "All U Need Is Love" – 5:32
9. "Legendary Children (2000)" (Holly Johnson, Nick Bagnall) – 3:38
10. "The Power of Love" (Brian Nash, Holly Johnson, Mark O'Toole, Peter Gill) – 5:03 (UK #56)
11. "Urban Jungle/In The House of the Rising Sun" (Album Edit) (Traditional) – 7:08

=== Soulstream (Expanded Edition) (2011) ===
==== Disc 1 – Original Album ====
1. "Lady Luck" – 4:19
2. "Soulstream" – 5:04
3. "Disco Heaven" (Sicario Club Mix Radio Edit) – 4:15
4. "Don't Give Up" – 4:14
5. "Hope" – 4:52
6. "The Best Invention" – 4:30
7. "Hallelujah!" (Eric Kupper Radio Mix) – 3:58
8. "All U Need Is Love" – 5:32
9. "Legendary Children (2000)" – 3:37
10. "The Power of Love" – 5:03
11. "Urban Jungle/In The House of the Rising Sun" (Album Edit)" – 7:08

==== Disc 1 continued – Bonus Tracks ====
1. "Legendary Children" (1994 Radio Mix) – 4:13
2. "The Power of Love" (Millennium Mix) – 5:33
3. "All U Need Is Love" (Demo) – 4:54
4. "In The House of the Rising Sun" (DNA Instrumental Mix) – 5:31
5. "Legendary Children" (Percapella) – 1:25

==== Disc 2 – The Dance Remixes ====
1. "In the House of the Rising Sun" (12" Definitive Mix) – 5:35
2. "In the House of the Rising Sun" (Doog's House Mix) – 5:03
3. "Disco Heaven" (Wayne G's Heaven Mix) – 7:03
4. "Disco Heaven" (Frankie Says... 12" Edit) – 6:22
5. "Disco Heaven" (Daz and Andy's Heavenly Remix) – 6:57
6. "Disco Heaven" (Sicario Club Mix) – 7:10
7. "Hallelujah!" (Frankie Says 12" Disco Mix) – 6:07
8. "Hallelujah!" (Eric Kupper 12" Pump Mix) – 7:54
9. "Legendary Children" (Dances With Handbags Mix) – 7:06
10. "Legendary Children" (Saturday Night in Heaven Mix) – 7:58
11. "Legendary Children" (London 12" Dub) – 6:49

== Personnel ==
- Holly Johnson – vocals, backing vocals, guitar, keyboard programming, art direction
- Yoad Nevo – guitar, programming
- Guy Chambers – guitar
- Mike Brittain, Paul Cullington, Paul Morgan – bass
- Don Richardson – double bass
- Black II Black – drum programming
- Luís Jardim – percussion
- Peter Oxendale – piano
- Claudia Fontaine, Angie Brown, Debbie Frame, Lizzie Charles, Sandra Charles, Stevie Vann-Lange, Beverley Skeete, Derek Green, Helen Terry – backing vocals
- Alan Munroe, Clare Johnson, Jack Jones, Jayne Casey, Joel Jones, Wolfgang Kuhle – "I love you" vocals on "All U Need is Love"
- Jimmy Gallagher, Tony Barlow – saxophone
- Dave Bishop – alto saxophone, flute
- Richard Henry – trombone, baritone horn
- Paul Spong, Steve Waterman – trumpet, flugelhorn
- Simon Gardiner – flugelhorn
- Boguslaw Kostecki, Gavyn Wright, Roger Garland, David Woodcock, Dermot Crehan, Eddie Wilson, Elizabeth Edwards, Jackie Shave, Jonathan Evans-Jones, Mark Berrow, Patrick Kiernan, Peter Oxer, Rebecca Hirsch, Rita Manning, Rolf Wilson, Simon Fischer, Vaughn Armon, Wilf Gibson, David Nolan, John Bradbury – violin
- Peter Lale, Bill Hawkes, Garfield Jackson, Kate Musker, Katie Wilkinson, Philip Dukes – viola
- Anthony Pleeth, David Daniels, Jonathan Tunnell, Martin Loveday, Paul Kegg, Tony Lewis, Jane Fenton – cello
- Nick Ingman – string quartet and flugelhorn arrangements
- Chris Toole, Andy Grey, Laurence Cedar, Tony O'Neil, Nick Bagnall – programming
