= Blast (album) =

Studio album by Holly Johnson
- Released: 24 April 1989
- Genre: Dance
- Length: 42:55
- Label: MCA
- Producer: Andy Richards; Dan Hartman; Stephen Hague; Steve Lovell

Holly Johnson chronology
| Blast (1989) | Hollelujah (1990) |

Professional ratings
Review scores
| Source | Rating |
|---|---|
| The Age | unfavourable |
| AllMusic | 4/5 stars |
| New Musical Express | 8/10 |
| Record-Journal | B |
| Record Mirror | 4/5 stars |

Blast is the debut solo album by the English singer and musician Holly Johnson. It was released in 1989 and reached No. 1 in the UK Albums Chart and sold over 300,000 copies making it platinum. The album stayed on the charts for 17 weeks. The album features the hits "Love Train", "Americanos", "Atomic City" and "Heaven's Here". The album was re-released in November 2009 and again in November 2010.

In 2010, Johnson marked "Love Will Come" and "Heaven's Here" as his favourite tracks from the album. The album's title Blast came from the short-lived magazine of the early-20th century British Vorticist art movement.

In a 2014 interview with The Arts Desk, Johnson spoke of his reaction to the success of Blast following the stressful nature of his court case with record label ZTT:

"The week it got to No.1 I was very... vindicated. That was a transient moment of victory in retrospect. I'd been on the promotional trail, touring and on the endless European television shows that existed in those days, for years and years, since the beginning of '84. Towards the end of '89, with a couple of hit singles and a platinum-selling album. I started to get health worries that ultimately came to consume my life for quite a number of years."

== Track listing ==
All tracks written by Johnson except "Atomic City" (Johnson, Dan Hartman).

1. "Atomic City" – 6:15
2. "Heaven's Here" – 4:16
3. "Americanos" – 3:35
4. "Deep in Love" – 3:58
5. "S.U.C.C.E.S.S." – 3:31
6. "Love Train" – 4:02
7. "Got It Made" – 3:49
8. "Love Will Come" – 4:28
9. "Perfume" – 3:33
10. "Feel Good" – 5:28

== Personnel ==
- Holly Johnson – vocals, synthesiser
- Neil Taylor, Johnny Willett, Vini Reilly, Steve Byrd – guitar
- Brian May – guitar solo on "Love Train"
- Guy Barker, John Barclay, John Thirkell, Phil Todd, Stuart Brooks – brass
- Nick Bagnall, Andy Richards, Marius de Vries, Steve Howell – keyboards
- Chris Whitten – drums
- Danny Cummings, Luís Jardim – percussion
- Chyna Gordon, Dee Lewis, Suddenly Denise, Stevie Lange, Lance Ellington, Mark Williamson, Vicky Brown – background vocals

== Charts ==
| Chart (1989) | Peak position |
|---|---|
| Australian Albums (ARIA) | 97 |
| Austrian Albums (Ö3 Austria) | 12 |
| Dutch Albums (Album Top 100) | 27 |
| German Albums (Offizielle Top 100) | 5 |
| Italian Albums (FIMI) | 10 |
| New Zealand Albums (RMNZ) | 11 |
| Norwegian Albums (VG-lista) | 10 |
| Swedish Albums (Sverigetopplistan) | 11 |
| Swiss Albums (Schweizer Hitparade) | 10 |
| UK Albums (OCC) | 1 |
