= Legendary Children =

"Legendary Children (All of Them Queer)"

Single by Holly Johnson
- Released: 1994
- Length: 3:30
- Label: Club Tools/Pleasuredome
- Songwriters: Holly Johnson; Nick Bagnall
- Producer: Holly Johnson

Holly Johnson singles chronology
"The People Want to Dance" (1991)	"Legendary Children (All of Them Queer)" (1994)	"Love and Hate" (1994)

"Legendary Children (All of Them Queer)" is a song by former Frankie Goes to Hollywood singer Holly Johnson, released in 1994 by label Club Tools as a non-album single. The song was written by Holly Johnson (lyrics and music) and Nick Bagnall (music). It peaked at No. 85 on the UK Singles Chart and became a number-one hit in Israel. A re-recording of "Legendary Children" was later included on Johnson's third studio album Soulstream, released in 1999.

== Background ==
"Legendary Children" was Johnson's first release of new material since 1991 and his first since discovering he was HIV-positive that year, which triggered a temporary withdrawal from music. Johnson then began writing songs with bassist Nick Bagnall, including "Legendary Children", which Johnson recorded and released as a gift to those who had supported his career over the previous ten years, particularly the gay community.

Speaking to Vox in 1994, Johnson spoke of the song's release on the small German label Club Tools: "I didn't particularly feel like walking into a major label with this song, knowing how conservative they can be. I feel at the moment I need to have full control over my work. So I've licensed it to the German label that distributed The Symbol's record "The Most Beautiful Girl in the World", as I figured they did alright with that one."

== Critical reception ==
Upon its release, Steven Wells of NME wrote, "This fabulously arch record will no doubt encourage thousands of healthy, normal young British chaps to dress smartly and hang around gymnasiums. My God! The possibilities! Perhaps rampant homosexuality is the only thing that will save us from the seemingly unstoppable spread of Crusty. Will Holly follow up with a record featuring a list of famous lesbians? What about famous 'heterosexuals'?! Are there any?! Will anybody on this record sue?! And will they play it on Radio 1 in the daytime? It's all rather exciting!" Music & Media wrote, "Seventies disco synth-sequencing form the backdrop to a catchy tribute to some celebrities that, history has it, were inclined to lean a certain way sexually." Alan Jones from Music Week rated it three out of five, adding that this "rather unsubtle and retro NRG track exists primarily as a vehicle for the former Frankie vocalist's rollcall of gay icons. Beyond that it has limited appeal, though it's nice to hear Helen Terry (ex-Culture Club) in a prominent supporting role." A German magazine gave the single five out of five stars and commented, "Musically like Frankie Goes To Hollywood - this pitiless dance stoker shows no weaknesses."

In a review of Soulstream, Caroline Sullivan of The Guardian said of the re-recorded version of "Legendary Children", "By default, the best tracks are the campest: the nostalgic "Disco Heaven" and "Legendary Children", which lists gay historical figures (is he quite sure about Shakespeare?)." Jon O'Brien of AllMusic retrospectively stated, "Unnecessary reworkings of "The Power of Love" and the 1994 flop, gay anthem "Legendary Children (All of Them Queer)" only highlight the creative rut he appeared to be stuck in."

== Track listing ==
12" single #1

1. "Legendary Children (The Loop's Radio Cut)" - 3:38
2. "Legendary Children (The Loop's Classic Extended Mix)" - 5:14
3. "Legendary Children (The Hall Of Trance Mix)" - 5:40
4. "Legendary Children (Rick's Queer Piano Version)" - 2:48
5. "Legendary Children (Percapella)" - 1:24

12" single #2

1. "Legendary Children (Dances With Handbags)" - 7:06
2. "Legendary Children (Saturday Night in Heaven Mix)" - 7:55
3. "Legendary Children (The Loop's Classic Extended Mix)" - 5:14
4. "Legendary Children (The Hall Of Trance Mix)" - 6:40
5. "Legendary Children (Rick's Queer Piano Version)" - 2:48

12" single (French release)

1. "Legendary Children (Saturday Night in Heaven Mix)" - 7:55
2. "Legendary Children (Dances With Handbags)" - 7:06
3. "Legendary Children (London 12" Dub)" - 6:49
4. "Legendary Children (Rick's Queer Piano Version)" - 2:48
5. "Legendary Children (Radio Mix)" - 4:11

12" single (German 2x 12" vinyl release)

1. "Legendary Children (Radio Mix)" - 4:11
2. "Legendary Children (Dances With Handbags)" - 7:06
3. "Legendary Children (Saturday Night in Heaven Mix)" - 7:55
4. "Legendary Children (London 12" Dub)" - 6:49
5. "Legendary Children (The Loop's Radio Cut)" - 3:38
6. "Legendary Children (The Loop's Classic Extended Mix)" - 5:14
7. "Legendary Children (The Hall Of Trance Mix)" - 5:40
8. "Legendary Children (Rick's Queer Piano Version)" - 2:48
9. "Legendary Children (Percapella)" - 1:24

12" single (German 2x 12" vinyl promo release)

1. "Legendary Children (Radio Mix)" - 4:11
2. "Legendary Children (Dances With Handbags)" - 7:06
3. "Legendary Children (Saturday Night in Heaven Mix)" - 7:55
4. "Legendary Children (London 12" Dub)" - 6:49
5. "Legendary Children (The Loop's Radio Cut)" - 3:38
6. "Legendary Children (The Loop's Classic Extended Mix)" - 5:14
7. "Legendary Children (The Hall Of Trance Mix)" - 5:40
8. "Legendary Children (Rick's Queer Piano Version)" - 2:48
9. "Legendary Children (Percapella)" - 1:24

CD single

1. "Legendary Children (Radio Mix)" - 4:11
2. "Legendary Children (Dances With Handbags)" - 7:06
3. "Legendary Children (Saturday Night in Heaven Mix)" - 7:55
4. "Legendary Children (London 12" Dub)" - 6:49
5. "Legendary Children (Rick's Queer Piano Version)" - 2:48

CD single (German "The Remixes" release)

1. "Legendary Children (The Loop's Radio Cut)" - 3:38
2. "Legendary Children (The Loop's Classic Extended Mix)" - 5:14
3. "Legendary Children (The Hall Of Trance Mix)" - 6:40
4. "Legendary Children (Percapella)" - 1:24

Cassette single (German promo)

1. "Legendary Children (Simon Harris Radio Edit)" - 4:21
2. "Legendary Children (Bona Radio Mix)" - 4:28
3. "Legendary Children (Saturday Night in Heaven Mix)" - 8:10
4. "Legendary Children (Muff Diva Dub Mix, London Edit)" - 6:58
5. "Legendary Children (Muff Diva Dub Mix, Newcastle Edit)" - 5:42
6. "Legendary Children (Sex Sells '94)" - 4:21
7. "Legendary Children (T.V. Mix)" - 4:18

== Charts ==
=== Weekly charts ===
Chart (1994)	Peak position
Israel (Israeli Singles Chart)	1
UK Singles (OCC)	85
UK Club Chart (Music Week)	92

=== Year-end charts ===
Chart (1994)	Position
Israel (Israeli Singles Chart)	46
