= Jill Sinclair =

British record company executive (1952–2014)

- Born: 5 April 1952; London, England
- Died: 22 March 2014 (aged 61) London, England
- Genres: Pop
- Occupations: Label founder; music manager
- Years active: 1977–2006
- Labels: ZTT; Stiff
- Spouse: Trevor Horn (m. 1980)

Jill Sinclair (5 April 1952 – 22 March 2014) was an English businesswoman who co-founded the record company ZTT Records. The Daily Telegraph described her as one of the "most successful people in the British music business". Sinclair was married to the record producer Trevor Horn. In 2006, Sinclair suffered irreversible brain damage after being accidentally struck by an air rifle pellet. She died of cancer in 2014, aged 61.

== Career ==
In 1973, at the age of 21, Sinclair emerged as one of the founders of Sarm Studios with her brother John Sinclair, and sound engineers Mike Stone and Gary Lyons. Sarm soon evolved into one of the most technically advanced recording studios in London – essentially the first 24-track studio – and it attracted major artists, like Queen, who recorded A Night at the Opera and A Day at the Races partially at Sarm Studios. Other artists who have recorded at Sarm East include Yes, INXS, the Clash and Madonna.

Sinclair started her career as a mathematics teacher, but started working full-time in Sarm Studios in 1977, at the age of 25. In 1978, Sarm Studios started a production company called Sarm Productions led by Sinclair, with records such as "Only Feel This Way" produced by her brother John Sinclair for his band Levinsky/Sinclair being one of their early productions. She also started as the manager of her husband Trevor Horn during the time the Buggles split. She convinced Horn to concentrate on music production, and arranged his first production deals with Dollar and ABC.

Sinclair and Horn founded Perfect Songs, a publishing company, in 1982. In the following year, together with NME writer Paul Morley, they founded ZTT Records which soon boomed into success. Sinclair became ZTT's managing director, while Paul Morley concentrated on marketing duties. In the same year Sinclair and Horn acquired Basing Street Studios from Island Records in exchange for distributing the ZTT label. The studio was renamed Sarm West Studios.

ZTT's first major signing was Frankie Goes to Hollywood, whose hits "Relax" and "Two Tribes" were among the most influential and best-selling singles of the decade. It was the label's second single, "Relax", that became the label's first number one in January 1984. "Relax" stayed in the Top 75 for a full year, and ZTT was well and truly established. During the 1980s, Grace Jones and Art of Noise were other ZTT acts to chart. In its early days the label also helped to shape the very structure and format of pop music (its 12" remixes getting chart positions of their own and its T-shirts becoming the uniform of the 1980s) and turned every aspect of the business of pop into entertainment.

In 1984, the Horn-Sinclair family businesses were reorganised as SPZ Group, which then consisted of Sarm Studios, Perfect Songs, and ZTT Records. The latter part of the decade was eclipsed by the bitter legal battle between ZTT and Holly Johnson, who fought his way out of a strict long-term recording contract. Similarly, in disagreement, a few other ZTT artists, like Art of Noise and Propaganda left the label.

Sinclair's brother John moved to Israel in 1987 to become a rabbi, and has not been involved in the Sinclair family's music business since the 1990s. In the same year, ZTT purchased the bankrupt Stiff Records. During this time ZTT refocused on the emerging dance music scene. Manchester group 808 State would reach the top 10 with their anthemic song "Pacific State" and three other singles and one album during the early 1990s. Seal was the next major ZTT act to emerge, in 1990.

== Personal life ==
Sinclair was born in London to a Jewish family. She married the music producer Trevor Horn in 1980, and they had four children: sons Aaron and William and daughters Gabriella and Alexandra.

On 25 June 2006, Aaron was practising with his air rifle, not realising his mother was close by. A 4.5 mm (.17 calibre) air gun pellet accidentally hit Sinclair in the neck, severing an artery and causing irreversible brain damage from hypoxia, leaving only her lower brain functions and no chance for recovery. She was taken to the Royal Berkshire Hospital intensive care unit, where her condition was described as "critical but stable". On 1 September 2006, ZZT Records confirmed that Sinclair was in a natural coma and had been moved to a rehabilitation centre. In September 2009, Horn told The Times he preferred not to answer questions about his wife but confirmed she was still in a coma. In June 2012, Horn told The Sunday Times that Sinclair was no longer in a coma but that she could not speak, move or smile, and that "the only expression she can show is of discomfort". Sinclair died of cancer on 22 March 2014, aged 61.
