= Heaven's Here =

Single by Holly Johnson

from the album Blast
- B-side: "Hollelujah"
- Released: 11 September 1989
- Genre: Pop
- Length: 3:55 (7-inch); 4:16 (album version)
- Label: MCA
- Songwriter: Holly Johnson
- Producer: Stephen Hague

Holly Johnson singles chronology
"Atomic City" (1989)	"Heaven's Here" (1989)	"Where Has Love Gone?" (1990)

"Heaven's Here" a song by English singer Holly Johnson, released in 1989 as the fourth and final single from his debut solo album Blast. It was written by Johnson and produced by Stephen Hague. The song reached No. 62 in the UK and No. 22 in Ireland.

== Critical reception ==
Upon release, Melody Maker commented: "Holly's a great one for the notion that social improvement begins with the self. We are all prospective gods and the sweet "Heaven's Here" tells us, "This is your lifetime"." Tony Beard of Record Mirror described the song as "classy show-off pop" and added: "Not as stop-you-in-yer-tracks catchy as "Americanos" nor as thrillingly shocksome as anything by Frankie, but Holly Johnson really has hit a rich vein of form of late hasn't he?"

David Swift of New Musical Express described the song as "quality fluff" and commented, "All the right elements are present - back-up nodules from the Gates of Pearl, tinkling cascade FX [and] family-teatime chorus." Music & Media considered the song "more commercial" than the preceding "Atomic City" and described it as an "easy-going, mid-tempo number with a good chorus".

Johnny Dee of Record Mirror described the song as "sweet, sparkling pop fizz". The Age commented: "The lad's mellowed. "Atomic City" is very 'Frankie Goes to Hollywood', but "Heaven's Here" is an ordinary, vague, love song - it'd be a good song to give to Jason. I can see him now, haloed by pure white clouds on a sand dune, Kylie's face in the clouds of course."

== Track listing ==
7-inch single

1. "Heaven's Here" - 3:55
2. "Hollelujah" - 4:12

12-inch single

1. "Heaven's Here (Mount Olympus Mix)" - 9:23
2. "Hollelujah" - 4:12
3. "Heaven's Here" - 3:55

CD single

1. "Heaven's Here" - 3:57
2. "Heaven's Here (Mount Olympus Mix)" - 9:23
3. "Hollelujah" - 4:08

Cassette single

1. "Heaven's Here" - 3:55
2. "Hollelujah" - 4:12

== Chart performance ==
Chart (1989)	Peak position
German Singles Chart	58
Irish Singles Chart	22
UK Singles Chart	62

== Remixes and B-sides ==
- "Hollelujah"
- "Heaven's Here" (12-inch version)
- "Heaven's Here" (Mount Olympus mix)
- "Heaven's Here" (Julian Mendelsohn remix)
