= Perfect Songs =

English music publishing company

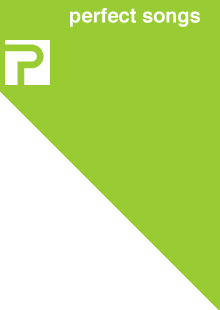
- Location: Notting Hill, London, England
- Owner: Universal Music Publishing Group
- Affiliations: Associate companies: ZTT Records; Stiff Records
- Website: perfectsongs.com

Perfect Songs is a music publishing company based in London, England.

Songs featured in its catalogue include "Relax", "The Power of Love", and "Two Tribes" by Frankie Goes to Hollywood, which were number one hits on the UK Singles Chart; the Grammy Award-winning "Kiss from a Rose" by Seal; and "Beatbox", "Close (To the Edit)" and "Moments in Love" by the Art of Noise, both of which have been frequently sampled by other musical artists.

== History ==
Perfect Songs was formed in 1981 by record producer Trevor Horn and manager Jill Sinclair. It was acquired by Universal Music Publishing Group in February 2020.
