= Atomic City (Holly Johnson song) =

Single by Holly Johnson

from the album Blast
- B-side: "Beat the System"
- Released: 12 June 1989
- Length: 4:22 (7-inch version); 6:15 (album version)
- Label: MCA
- Songwriters: Holly Johnson; Dan Hartman
- Producer: Dan Hartman

Holly Johnson singles chronology
"Americanos" (1989)	"Atomic City" (1989)	"Heaven's Here" (1989)

"Atomic City" is a song by English singer Holly Johnson, released in 1989 as the third single from his debut solo album Blast. It was written by Johnson and Dan Hartman, and produced by Hartman. The song reached number 18 in the UK Singles Chart and remained in the top 100 for four weeks. A music video was filmed to promote the single, directed by Colin Chilvers and produced by Nick Verden for Radar Films.

== Background ==
In an interview with Johnson on his memories of Hartman for Hartman's unofficial fan site, Johnson recalled of the song: "I had all the lyrics and vocal ideas already sorted out but needed someone to sort out the structure, Dan came up with the funky bassline and made it work. He asked for 10% of the song."

== Critical reception ==
Upon its release as a single, Stuart Maconie, writing for New Musical Express, considered "Atomic City" to be lovable nonsense but no 'Relax'." He added, "'Atomic City' is perhaps not the most exciting record ever made but the wonderful Holly could sing the Berkshire phone book and invest it with some naughty glamour." Music & Media noted the song's "dark, funky backing", "dramatic orchestral breaks", "subdued but highly seductive chorus" and "excellent production".

In a review of Blast, Melody Maker noted the song's "hard-on, haughty syncopation" and added, "Blast may lack Trevor Horn's exotic depth and sweep but 'Atomic City' has learned enough from Frankie to locate a hiatus of pastoral serenity in the midst of the swelter." Smash Hits felt the song was "overblown". Australian newspaper The Age described the song as "very 'Frankie Goes to Hollywood'". Record-Journal felt the song was "designed for the DJ's booth at the local disco".

== Track listing ==
7-inch single

1. "Atomic City" - 4:22
2. "Beat the System" - 3:44

12-inch single

1. "Atomic City (Extended Version)" - 6:16
2. "Beat the System" - 3:44

12-inch remix single

1. "Atomic City (The Bona Biodegradable Mix)" - 7:34
2. "Beat the System" - 3:44
3. "Atomic City (Environmental Instrumental)" - 6:35

CD single

1. "Atomic City" - 4:23
2. "Beat the System" - 3:48
3. "Atomic City (Extended Version)" - 6:19

== Chart performance ==
Chart (1989)	Peak position
Austrian Singles Chart	19
Belgian Singles Chart (Vl)	22
Dutch Singles Chart	40
German Singles Chart	16
Irish Singles Chart	9
Italian Singles Chart	29
New Zealand Singles Chart	20
Swiss Singles Chart	10
UK Singles Chart	18

== Remixes and B-sides ==
- "Atomic City" (The Bona Biodegradable Mix)
- "Beat the System"
- "Atomic City" (Environmental Instrumental)
- "Atomic City" (extended version) (Saxes and Electric Sax by Gary Barnacle)
- Holly Johnson - "Atomic City" (Razormaid)
- Holly Johnson - "Atomic City" (RDS Mix)
- Holly Johnson - "Atomic City" (UNICD extended version)
