= Americanos (song) =

1989 single by Holly Johnson

Single by Holly Johnson

from the album Blast
- Released: 20 March 1989
- Length: 3:35
- Label: MCA
- Songwriter: Holly Johnson
- Producers: Andy Richards, Steve Lovell

Holly Johnson singles chronology
"Love Train" (1989)	"Americanos" (1989)	"Atomic City" (1989)

"Americanos" is a song by English singer Holly Johnson, released in 1989 as the second single from his debut solo album, Blast (1989). It was written by Johnson, and produced by Andy Richards and Steve Lovell, with additional production from Dan Hartman.

The song reached No. 4 in the United Kingdom and was a commercial success across Europe, topping the Austrian Singles Chart and peaking at No. 3 on the Eurochart Hot 100. A music video was filmed to promote the single. This featured an affluent American family and their somewhat poorer but good hearted neighbours each watching a televised lottery show.

== Critical reception ==
Upon release, Chris Heath of Smash Hits described the song as an "'80s update of David Bowie's 'Young Americans' in both its content and its spirit, where he acknowledges the superficiality of the American dream but isn't narrow-minded enough to simply condemn it." New Musical Express noted the song's "acid irony". Steve Sutherland of Melody Maker described the song as having "skirt-twirling Latinate sarcasm". Music & Media described the song as a "thoroughly modern slice of blue-eyed soul" and "very commercial". Eleonor Levy of Record Mirror described the song as being "more clean, lively cartoon pop from Holly" and a "chirpy littly tune that will no doubt grow and grow", although lacking the "joie de vivre" of "Love Train".

== Track listings ==
- 7-inch single
1. "Americanos" – 3:34
2. "Americanos" (Mambo Dub Mix) – 4:11
- 12-inch single
1. "Americanos" (Liberty Mix) – 5:32
2. "Americanos" (radio 7-inch mix) – 3:34
3. "Americanos" (Mambo Dub Mix) – 4:11
- 12-inch remix single ("Magimix" release)
1. "Americanos" (Magimix) – 6:38
2. "Americanos" (Magimix Dub) – 4:09
- 12-inch remix single (American/Canadian extended version release)
1. "Americanos" (extended version) – 6:44
2. "Americanos" (P.W.L. extended version) – 5:10
- 12-inch remix single ("Like an Americanos" release)
1. "Americanos" (House Piano Remix) – 6:44
2. "Americanos" (bonus piano and effects) – 5:10
- CD single
1. "Americanos (radio 7-inch mix) – 3:37
2. "Americanos (Liberty Mix) – 5:32
3. "Americanos (Mambo Dub Mix) – 4:14

== Charts ==
=== Weekly charts ===
Chart (1989)	Peak position
Australia (ARIA)	77
Austria (Ö3 Austria Top 40)	1
Belgium (Ultratop 50 Flanders)	5
Denmark (IFPI)	2
Europe (Eurochart Hot 100)	3
Finland (Suomen virallinen lista)	6
Ireland (IRMA)	6
Netherlands (Dutch Top 40)	6
Netherlands (Single Top 100)	8
New Zealand (Recorded Music NZ)	10
Norway (VG-lista)	6
Spain (PROMUSICAE)	11
Sweden (Sverigetopplistan)	7
Switzerland (Schweizer Hitparade)	4
UK Singles (Official Charts)	4
US Dance Club Songs (Billboard)	36
West Germany (GfK)	2

=== Year-end charts ===
Chart (1989)	Position
Austria (Ö3 Austria Top 40)	9
Belgium (Ultratop)	38
Europe (Eurochart Hot 100)	25
Netherlands (Dutch Top 40)	53
Netherlands (Single Top 100)	72
UK Singles (OCC)	56
West Germany (Media Control)	13

== Certifications ==
Region	Certification	Certified units/sales
United Kingdom (BPI)	Silver	200,000^{^}
^{^} Shipments figures based on certification alone.
