= Love Train (Holly Johnson song) =

1989 single by Holly Johnson

Single by Holly Johnson

from the album Blast
- B-side: "Murder in Paradise"
- Released: 9 January 1989
- Genre: Pop
- Length: 4:02
- Label: MCA
- Songwriter: Holly Johnson
- Producers: Andy Richards, Steve Lovell

Holly Johnson singles chronology
"Hobo Joe" (1980)	"Love Train" (1989)	"Americanos" (1989)

"Love Train" is a song by English singer Holly Johnson, released on 9 January 1989 as the lead single from his debut solo album, Blast (1989). It was written by Johnson and produced by Andy Richards and Steve Lovell with additional production by Stephen Hague. The song reached No. 4 in the United Kingdom, spending 11 weeks on the chart, and was certified silver by British Phonographic Industry (BPI) in February 1989. In the United States, the song reached No. 65 on the Billboard Hot 100.

"Love Train" features a guitar solo from Queen guitarist Brian May and backing vocals from Don Snow and Lance Ellington. The single's B-side, "Murder in Paradise", is a non-album track exclusive to the single. A music video was filmed to promote the single, directed by Marco Cerere, and Johnson performed the song on the UK music show Top of the Pops.

== Critical reception ==
On its release, Terry Staunton of New Musical Express picked "Love Train" as "single of the week" in the issue of 7 January 1989. He described it as "the most out-and-out pop song Holly's ever sung" and predicted it would reach the UK top five. He wrote, "'Love Train' is four minutes of bouncy bliss which finds him in fine voice. Pretty corny lyrics about stoking it up and getting on board roll off the tongue and into our hearts as a nation goes apeshit on the dancefloor." Jerry Smith of Music Week praised it as "a strikingly elegant dance track" and noted Johnson's "soaring vocals" are "encased in a shimmering designer sound that should ensure success".

In a review of Blast, Steve Sutherland of Melody Maker commented, "Blast is essentially a dance LP. There are exceptions but mostly it's smart, ankle-shuffling stuff like the cute mini-masterpiece of pneumatic innuendo, 'Love Train'." Johnny Dee of Record Mirror described the song as "the perfect commercial pop song". American newspaper Record-Journal wrote, "Best songs are cuts such as 'Love Train,' where Holly shows that soul and dance music are not necessarily exclusive of each other. If Simply Red had any energy these days, this is how Mick Hucknall would sound." In May 1989, Billboard picked the song as "new and noteworthy". They pointed out the song's "lyrical hook and percolating rhythm charm".

== Track listings ==
- 7-inch single and US cassette single
1. "Love Train"
2. "Murder in Paradise"
- 12-inch, CD, and UK cassette single
1. "Love Train" (Ride the "A" Train) – 6:53
2. "Love Train (Stoke It Up)" (7-inch mix) – 4:02
3. "Murder in Paradise" – 4:27
- European mini-CD single
1. "Love Train" (12-inch mix) – 6:53
2. "Love Train" (7-inch mix) – 4:02
3. "Murder in Paradise" – 4:27
- US 12-inch remix single
1. "Love Train" (Americana Big Beat version) – 6:35
2. "Love Train" (Iron-Horse instrumental) – 5:00
3. "Love Train" (Americana 12-inch version) – 6:20
4. "Love Train" (Bonus Big Beat radio version) – 4:30
5. "Love Train" (Americana Pop version) – 4:00

== Personnel ==
=== "Love Train" ===
- Producer – Andy Richards, Steve Lovell
- Additional Producer, Mixer – Stephen Hague
- Keyboard Programming – Andy Richards, Marius de Vries
- Engineer – Dave Meegan, Mike "Spike" Drake, Tony Phillips
- Vocals - Holly Johnson
- Backing Vocals – Don Snow, Lance Ellington
- Guitar – Brian May, Neil Taylor
- Writer – Holly Johnson
- Single Artwork – Accident

=== "Murder in Paradise" ===
- Producer – Holly Johnson
- Arranger – Guy Chambers, Holly Johnson, Nick Bagnall
- Keyboard Programming – Holly Johnson, Nick Bagnall, Guy Chambers
- Engineer – Tim Hunt
- Vocals - Holly Johnson
- Guitar – Nick Bagnall
- Writer – Holly Johnson

== Charts ==
=== Weekly charts ===
Chart (1989)	Peak position
Australia (ARIA)	35
Austria (Ö3 Austria Top 40)	17
Belgium (Ultratop 50 Flanders)	15
Canada Top Singles (RPM)	56
Europe (Eurochart Hot 100)	10
Finland (Suomen virallinen lista)	7
Ireland (IRMA)	5
Italy Airplay (Music & Media)	12
Netherlands (Dutch Top 40)	15
Netherlands (Single Top 100)	12
New Zealand (Recorded Music NZ)	20
Norway (VG-lista)	10
Sweden (Sverigetopplistan)	14
Switzerland (Schweizer Hitparade)	8
UK Singles (Official Charts)	4
US Billboard Hot 100	65
West Germany (GfK)	4

=== Year-end charts ===
Chart (1989)	Position
Europe (Eurochart Hot 100)	60
UK Singles (OCC)	42
West Germany (Media Control)	31
