= Frankie Goes to Hollywood discography =

Band discography

- Studio albums: 2
- Compilation albums: 10
- Singles: 7
- Video albums: 3
- Music videos: 10

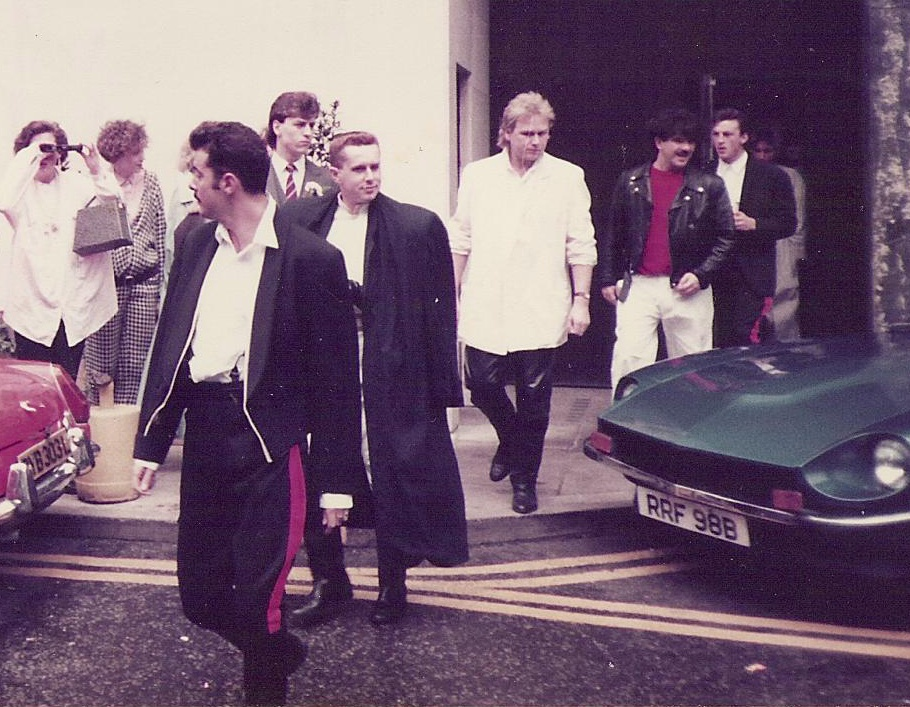
Photograph of Frankie Goes to Hollywood in London

Frankie Goes to Hollywood were a British band who released two studio albums and seven singles before disbanding in 1987. Since then, almost all of their tracks have been rereleased on compact disc, including various compilation albums and CD singles. In recent years, their record company has also released original material that was not released during the band's heyday.

In 1983, they released their debut single, "Relax", which was highly controversial, due to its sexually explicit lyrics and highly suggestive music video. The video, which was shot in a gay nightclub, was banned by the BBC and MTV. After an extremely slow climb, including one week where the song actually went down the chart, Relax eventually topped the UK Singles Chart for five weeks, and it still stands today as one of the best-selling UK singles ever. It also gained success in the United States, where it peaked at number 10 on the Billboard Hot 100. The band's debut album, Welcome to the Pleasuredome, was released in October 1984 and reached the top of the UK Albums Chart. Three more singles were released from the album: "Two Tribes", "The Power of Love" and "Welcome to the Pleasuredome". "Two Tribes" and "The Power of Love" both reached number one on the UK Singles Chart, while "Welcome to the Pleasuredome" peaked at number 2.

Frankie Goes to Hollywood's second and final studio album, Liverpool, was released in 1986. It failed to achieve the same success as its predecessor, with only one of its three singles reaching the top 10 of the UK chart. The album peaked at number 5 on the UK Albums Chart, and was certified Gold by the British Phonographic Industry, whereas Welcome to the Pleasuredome was certified triple platinum.

To coincide with the release of Bang!... The Greatest Hits of Frankie Goes to Hollywood, the tracks "Welcome to the Pleasuredome" (1993) and "Two Tribes" (1994) were re-released in the UK as singles in remixed form. The tracks "Relax" (1994) and "The Power of Love" (1993) were also re-released, but this time in their original form (the CD singles both featured at least one of the original 1984 12 inch remixes).

To coincide with the release of Maximum Joy in 2000, new remixes of "The Power of Love", "Two Tribes", and "Welcome to the Pleasuredome" all entered the UK charts.

In 1986, P4F (Propaganda for Frankie) released "P. Machinery Medley with Relax", a medley of "Relax" with Propaganda's "p:Machinery".

== Albums ==
=== Studio albums ===
Title	Details	Peak chart positions													Certifications (sales threshold)
Title	Details	UK	AUS	AUT	CAN	FRA	GER	JPN	NL	NOR	NZ	SWE	SWI	US	Certifications (sales threshold)
Welcome to the Pleasuredome	Release date: 29 October 1984; Label: ZTT, Island; Formats: CD, LP, cassette	1	7	3	9	7	4	30	2	8	1	7	5	33	CAN: Platinum; GER: Platinum; UK: 3× Platinum; US: Gold
Liverpool	Release date: 20 October 1986; Label: ZTT; Formats: CD, LP, cassette	5	72	7	72	9	5	31	5	8	12	13	7	88	GER: Gold; UK: Gold

=== Compilation albums ===
Title	Details	Peak chart positions										Certifications (sales threshold)
Title	Details	UK	AUS	AUT	FRA	GER	JPN	NL	NZ	SWE	SWI	Certifications (sales threshold)
Bang!	Release date: 10 July 1985; Label: ZTT/Island Records; Formats: CD, LP, cassette; Japan-only release	—	—	—	—	—	21	—	—	—	—	
Bang!... The Greatest Hits of Frankie Goes to Hollywood	Release date: 18 October 1993; Label: ZTT/Island Records; Formats: CD, cassette	4	5	15	15	8	—	20	38	21	11	GER: Gold; UK: Gold
Reload! Frankie: The Whole 12 Inches	Release date: 9 May 1994; label: ZTT Records; Formats: CD, cassette	—	—	—	—	—	—	—	—	—	—	
Maximum Joy	Release date: 25 October 2000; Label: ZTT Records; Formats: CD, cassette	54	—	—	—	—	—	—	—	—	—	
The Club Mixes 2000	Release date: 14 November 2000; Label: Repertoire Records; Formats: CD, cassette	—	—	—	—	—	—	—	—	—	—	
Twelve Inches	Release date: 16 August 2001; Label: ZTT Records; Formats: CD, cassette	—	—	—	—	—	—	—	—	—	—	
Rage Hard: The Sonic Collection	Release date: 2001; Label: ZTT Records; Formats: SACD	—	—	—	—	—	—	—	—	—	—	
Frankie Say Greatest	Release date: 2 November 2009; Label: ZTT Records; Formats: CD, music download	27	—	—	—	—	—	—	—	—	—	
Sex Mix	Release date: 3 August 2012; Label: Salvo; Formats: CD	—	—	—	—	61	—	—	—	—	—	
Frankie Said	Release date: 5 November 2012; Label: ZTT Records; Formats: CD, music download	87	—	—	—	—	—	—	—	—	—	
The Best of Frankie Goes To Hollywood	Release date: 20 September 2013; Label: Metro Select; Formats: CD	—	—	—	—	—	—	—	—	—	—	
Simply Frankie Goes To Hollywood	Release date: 6 July 2015; Label: Union Square Music; Formats: CD	—	—	—	—	—	—	—	—	—	—	
Essential Frankie Goes To Hollywood	Release date: 14 January 2022; Label: UMC; Formats: CD	87	—	—	—	—	—	—	—	—	—	
"—" denotes releases that did not chart or were not released in that territory.

== Singles ==
Year	Single	Peak chart positions													Certifications (sales threshold)	Album
Year	Single	UK	AUS	AUT	CAN	FRA	GER	IRE	NL	NOR	NZ	SWE	SWI	US	Certifications (sales threshold)	Album
1983	"Relax"	1	5	4	11	1	1	3	5	2	10	4	1	10	CAN: Gold; FRA: Gold; UK: Platinum; US: Gold	Welcome to the Pleasuredome
1984	"Two Tribes"	1	4	16	9	48	1	1	1	4	1	9	4	43	CAN: Gold; UK: Platinum	Welcome to the Pleasuredome
1984	"The Power of Love"	1	4	8	20	20	4	2	10	—	2	14	2	—	UK: Platinum; GER: Gold	Welcome to the Pleasuredome
1985	"Welcome to the Pleasuredome"	2	46	20	41	—	9	2	14	—	9	—	20	48	UK: Silver	Welcome to the Pleasuredome
1986	"Rage Hard"	4	45	12	82	32	1	2	6	8	12	19	5	—	UK: Silver	Liverpool
1986	"Warriors of the Wasteland"	19	—	—	—	2	7	12	26	—	30	—	13	—		Liverpool
1987	"Watching the Wildlife"	28	—	—	—	—	23	24	47	—	—	—	—	—		Liverpool
"—" denotes releases that did not chart or were not released in that territory.

=== Re-issued singles ===
Year	Single	Peak chart positions								Album
Year	Single	UK	AUS	AUT	FRA	GER	IRE	NL	SWI	Album
1993	"Relax"	5	22	10	21	13	6	12	6	Bang!.. The Greatest Hits of Frankie Goes To Hollywood
1993	"Welcome to the Pleasuredome"	18	74	—	—	—	22	—	—	Bang!.. The Greatest Hits of Frankie Goes To Hollywood
1993	"The Power of Love"	10	—	—	—	80	16	—	—	Bang!.. The Greatest Hits of Frankie Goes To Hollywood
1994	"Two Tribes"	16	—	—	—	—	—	—	—	Bang!.. The Greatest Hits of Frankie Goes To Hollywood
2000	"The Power of Love"	6	65	—	—	—	35	—	—	Maximum Joy
2000	"Two Tribes"	17	—	—	—	—	—	—	—	Maximum Joy
2000	"Welcome to the Pleasuredome"	45	—	—	—	—	—	—	—	Maximum Joy
2001	"Relax"	—	—	—	—	—	—	—	—	Twelve Inches
2009	"Relax"	191	—	—	—	—	—	—	—	Frankie Say Greatest
"—" denotes releases that did not chart or were not released in that territory.

=== Promotional singles ===
- 2013: "Maximum Joy"

== Videography ==
=== Video albums ===
Year	Title	Format
1987	From a Wasteland to an Artificial Paradise	LaserDisc
1993	Shoot! The Greatest Hits of Frankie Goes to Hollywood	LaserDisc, VHS
2000	Hard On	DVD
2014	Frankie Said (Deluxe Edition)	DVD + CD

=== Music videos ===
Year	Title	Director
1983	"Relax"	Bernard Rose
1984	"Relax"	Godley & Creme
1984	"Relax"	David Mallet, Brian De Palma
1984	"Two Tribes"	Godley & Creme
1984	"The Power of Love"	Godley & Creme
1985	"Welcome to the Pleasuredome"	Bernard Rose
1986	"Rage Hard"	Paul Morley, David Bailey
1986	"Warriors of the Wasteland"	Nick Burgess-Jones
1987	"Watching the Wildlife"	Mike Perterly, Josh Thorne
2009	"Relax"	none
