= Maximum Joy (disambiguation) =

Maximum Joy are an English post-punk band.

Maximum Joy may also redfer to:

- "Maximum Joy", a song by Frankie Goes to Hollywood from the 1986 album Liverpool
- Maximum Joy (album), by Frankie Goes to Hollywood, 2000
- Maximum Joy, a 2025 album by Luis Dubuc as Mystery Skulls
- Maximum Joy, a 1995 album by Iodine with Brad Pemberton
- "Maximum Joy", a song by Shinichi Osawa from the 2007b album The One
