= Denise Dorrance =

American-born cartoonist and illustrator

Denise Dorrance is an American-born cartoonist and illustrator who publishes under the name Dorrance.

== Life and work ==
Born in Cedar Rapids, Iowa, she moved to New York in her early twenties where she worked in the fashion department of Cosmopolitan magazine, later moved into photography, and eventually ran Magnum Photos corporate photography division. In 1992 she moved to London and, in spite of herself, began a successful career as a cartoonist and book illustrator.

In 2013 a collection of her cartoons was published by Idlewild, It's All About Mimi. Mimi is the story of a woman trying to balance life as a fashionista and a mother—and considering Mimi's desire for minimalism and all things chic, it doesn't come naturally!

Her sharply ironic work appears regularly in magazines and newspapers such as The Spectator, Red, The Sunday Times and others. 'Mimi by Dorrance' ran as a weekly humorous cartoon for The Mail on Sunday's "You" magazine, and she illustrated a weekly syndicated column for News Life Media in Australia.

Her first graphic novel, Polar Vortex, was published in 2024. It captures the grief, nostalgia, and chaos of traveling home to care for an elderly parent in crisis and was selected at one of Oprah Daily's "12 Picture-Perfect Grown-up Graphic Novels".

== Personal life ==
Dorrance is married to documentary filmmaker Paul Yule, with whom she has a son.

== Publications ==
=== Books illustrated by Dorrance ===
- Fifty is not a Four-Letter Word (2007) by Linda Kelsey
- A Red Dress, and Other Poems (2008) by Liz Cowley
- Single Mother on the Verge (2009) by Maria Roberts
- The Virginia Monologues (2009) by Virginia Ironside
- Talking about Jane Austen in Baghdad (2010) by Bee Rowlatt & May Witwit
- The Summer Season (2011) by Julia Williams
- Women of a Dangerous Age (2012) by Fanny Blake
- Civil Society at the Crossroads (2012) NGO comic strip with N.D. Mazin
- Worry With Mother (2016) by Francesca Hornak
- Manners: A Modern Field Guide (2021) by Kay Plunkett-Hogge and Deborah Robertson

=== Books by Dorrance ===
- It's All About Mimi (2013)
- Polar Vortex (2024)
