= And Then There Was One =

And Then There Was One may refer to:

== Films ==
- And Then There Was One (1994 film), a 1994 television film
- And Then There Was One (2016 film), a 2016 documentary film on the history of Southern Railway 4501

== Television ==
- "And Then There Was One", a 1969 episode of The Outcasts
- "And Then There Was One", a 1987 episode of The Golden Girls
- "And Then There Was One", a 2010 episode of Persons Unknown
- "And Then There Was One", a 2012 episode of Private Practice, season 5.
- "And Then There Was One", a 2014 episode of A Crime to Remember

== Other ==
- A line from the 1868 minstrel show song "Ten Little Injuns" by Septimus Winner
- And Then There Was One, the billing for the 2001 Bernard Hopkins vs. Félix Trinidad boxing match

== See also ==
- And Then There Were None, 1938 mystery novel by Agatha Christie
- And Then There Was No One, 2009 novel by Gilbert Adair
