= Paul Yule =

Paul Yule may refer to:

- Paul Yule (photojournalist) (born 1956), photojournalist and film maker
- Paul Alan Yule, German archaeologist

== See also ==
- Paul Youll (born 1965), English science fiction and fantasy artist
