= Christopher Austin =

British conductor

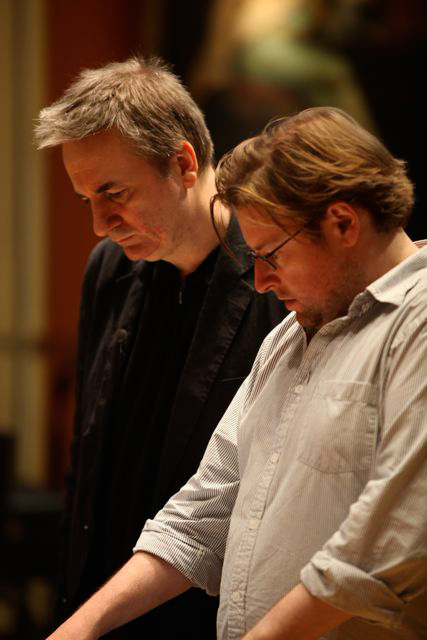
Christopher Austin (right) and Paul Morley in rehearsal at the Royal Academy of Music.

Christopher Austin (born 14 November 1968) is a British conductor, and an arranger and orchestrator of film and television scores.

Austin originally intended to become a composer. He studied at the University of Bristol with Adrian Beaumont and Raymond Warren (1987–90), and subsequently at the Guildhall School of Music and Drama with Robert Saxton and Simon Bainbridge.

As a conductor he is most associated with contemporary music. He is the founder and artistic director of the Brunel Ensemble. He has also worked with many of the leading orchestras in the UK and Europe, including the Royal Philharmonic Orchestra and The Royal Ballet.

His film work includes The Hitchhiker's Guide to the Galaxy and The League of Gentlemen's Apocalypse.

He often collaborates with the composer Joby Talbot, with whom he co-wrote the song "So Long, and Thanks for All the Fish", along with Garth Jennings, director of The Hitchhiker's Guide to the Galaxy.

Austin teaches composition, conducting and orchestration at the Royal Academy of Music, in London. He was the composition tutor of Paul Morley in the BBC television documentary How to Be a Composer.
