= Hard on =

Hard on may refer to:

- Erection, the enlargement of the penis
- Hard On (video), by Frankie Goes to Hollywood, 2000

== See also ==
- Hard-Ons, an Australian musical group
