= Words and Music: A History of Pop in the Shape of a City =

2003 book by Paul Morley

- Author: Paul Morley
- Language: English
- Genre: Non-fiction
- Publisher: Bloomsbury Publishing
- Publication date: 2003
- ISBN: 978-0-7475-5778-4

Words and Music: A History of Pop in the Shape of a City is a 2003 book charting the history of popular music, by the music journalist and cultural commentator Paul Morley. Its style takes the form of a robotic Kylie Minogue traveling, with Morley, in a "cyber-car" toward a city of "sound and ideas". The starting points for this history of popular music are Morley's favourite pieces at the time of writing, Kylie Minogue's electro-pop song "Can't Get You Out of My Head" and Alvin Lucier's experimental "I am sitting in a room". From these musical compositions Morley reflects on the meanings of music in many forms, avant-garde and pop, iconic and obscure, mechanical and digital, commercial and creative, human and robotic. Morley writes on what he describes as the non linear history of music and shifts away from the "canon" of rock music, placing other acts such as Brian Eno and Kraftwerk at the center.
