= Rage Hard: The Sonic Collection =

Greatest hits album by Frankie Goes to Hollywood
- Released: 2001
- Recorded: 1983–1986
- Genre: New wave; dance
- Length: 72:00
- Label: ZTT
- Producer: Trevor Horn; Stephen Lipson

Frankie Goes to Hollywood chronology
| Twelve Inches (2001) | Rage Hard: The Sonic Collection (2001) | Frankie Say Greatest (2009) |

Rage Hard: The Sonic Collection is a greatest hits album by Frankie Goes to Hollywood, released in 2001 by ZTT Records on SACD. Its track listing is identical to the first disc of the 2000 compilation Maximum Joy.

== Background ==
The album consists of all of the band's seven singles in their album versions, as well as six album tracks. It includes all four cover versions the band recorded.

Design and art direction were by Simon Griffin and Ed Sullivan at Dolphin Studio.

== Track listing ==
1. "Relax" – 3:57
2. "Two Tribes" – 3:22
3. "Ferry Cross the Mersey" – 4:03
4. "The World Is My Oyster" – 1:58
5. "Welcome to the Pleasuredome" – 13:39
6. "Maximum Joy" – 5:30
7. "San Jose" – 3:09
8. "Warriors of the Wasteland" – 5:00
9. "Rage Hard" – 5:02
10. "War" – 6:12
11. "Watching the Wildlife" – 4:17
12. "Born to Run" – 4:05
13. "The Power of Love" – 5:30
