= Southern Railway 4501 =

Preserved American Ms class 2-8-2 steam locomotive

- Southern Railway No. 4501 in Summerville, Georgia, on September 5, 2026.
Type and origin
- Power type: Steam
- Builder: Baldwin Locomotive Works
- Serial number: 37085
- Model: 12-48 1/4 E
- Build date: October 1911
- Rebuilder: Southern Railway
- Rebuild date: 1940s
Specifications
- Configuration
  - Whyte: 2-8-2
  - UIC: 1'D1'h
- Gauge: 4 ft 8 1/2 in (1,435 mm) standard gauge
- Driver dia.: 63 in (1,600 mm)
- Adhesive weight: 215,700 lb (97,800 kg)
- Loco weight: 272,900 lb (123,800 kg)
- Fuel type: Coal
- Fuel capacity: Old tender: 12 t (12 long tons; 13 short tons); New tender: 18 t (18 long tons; 20 short tons)
- Water cap.: Old tender: 8,000 US gal (30,000 L; 6,700 imp gal); New tender: 13,000 US gal (49,000 L; 11,000 imp gal), formerly 12,500 US gal (47,000 L; 10,400 imp gal) and 13,400 US gal (51,000 L; 11,200 imp gal)
- Boiler pressure: 205 psi (1.41 MPa), formerly 200 psi (1.38 MPa) and 175 psi (1.21 MPa)
- Feedwater heater: Worthington SA (added during its 2012-2014 overhaul)
- Cylinders: Two, outside
- Cylinder size: 27 in × 30 in (686 mm × 762 mm)
- Valve gear: Walschaerts
- Valve type: Piston valves
- Loco brake: Air
- Train brakes: Air
- Couplers: Knuckle
Performance figures
- Power output: 2,700 hp
- Tractive effort: 53,900 lbf (239.8 kN), formerly 51,625 lbf (229.6 kN)
- Factor of adh.: 4.00
Career
- Operators: Southern Railway; Kentucky and Tennessee Railway; Norfolk Southern Railway; Tennessee Valley Railroad Museum
- Class: Ms
- Number in class: 1st of 182
- Numbers: SOU 4501; K&T 12
- Nicknames: The Big Engine (by K&T crew); The Green Mikado
- Retired: July 1948 (1st revenue service); February 1964 (2nd revenue service); June 7, 1964 (1st excursion service); September 20, 1998 (2nd excursion service)
- Restored: October 7, 1948 (1st revenue service); June 6, 1964 (2nd revenue service); August 1966 (1st excursion service); September 6, 2014 (2nd excursion service)
- Current owner: Tennessee Valley Railroad Museum
- Disposition: Operational
- Mikado Locomotive No. 4501
- U.S. National Register of Historic Places
- Location within Tennessee Location within the United States
- Location: 2202 N. Chamberlain Ave., Chattanooga, Tennessee
- Coordinates: 35°3′43″N 85°15′1″W
- Built: 1911
- Built by: Baldwin Locomotive Works
- NRHP reference No.: 79002440
- Added to NRHP: March 28, 1979

Southern Railway 4501 is a preserved 2-8-2 "Mikado" type steam locomotive, the first of its wheel arrangement ordered by the Southern Railway (SOU). Built in October 1911 by the Baldwin Locomotive Works (BLW) in Philadelphia, Pennsylvania, No. 4501 pulled freight trains on the SOU system until 1948, when it was retired amid dieselization. It was sold to the shortline Kentucky and Tennessee Railway (K&T) in Stearns, Kentucky, to haul coal trains.

When the K&T dieselized in 1964, No. 4501 was purchased for $5,000 by railfan Paul Merriman, who brought it to Chattanooga, Tennessee. Repainted in SOU's passenger Sylvan green and gold paint scheme, No. 4501 became the primary excursion attraction of Southern's steam program from 1966, when it was operated by Merriman's 4501 Corporation. In 1975, he donated it to the Tennessee Valley Railroad Museum (TVRM) in Chattanooga, and until 1985, when No. 4501 was replaced with larger locomotives. The locomotive returned to mainline excursion service from 1991 to 1994, then sidelined when the SOU's successor, Norfolk Southern (NS), discontinued the steam program as insurance costs rose and rail network availability decreased.

In 1996, TVRM repainted No. 4501 in its original freight black livery and it continued to operate until 1998, when the locomotive's boiler flue time certificate expired. In 2011, after NS launched its 21st Century Steam program and TVRM returned Southern Railway 630 to service, the museum launched a restoration of No. 4501. The work included upgrades such as a feedwater heater and mechanical stoker; it was completed in 2014. Around 2026, TVRM repainted the locomotive back into the SOU Sylvan green paint scheme; it is used for tourist excursions, including longer trips to Summerville, Georgia.

== History ==
=== Background and revenue service ===
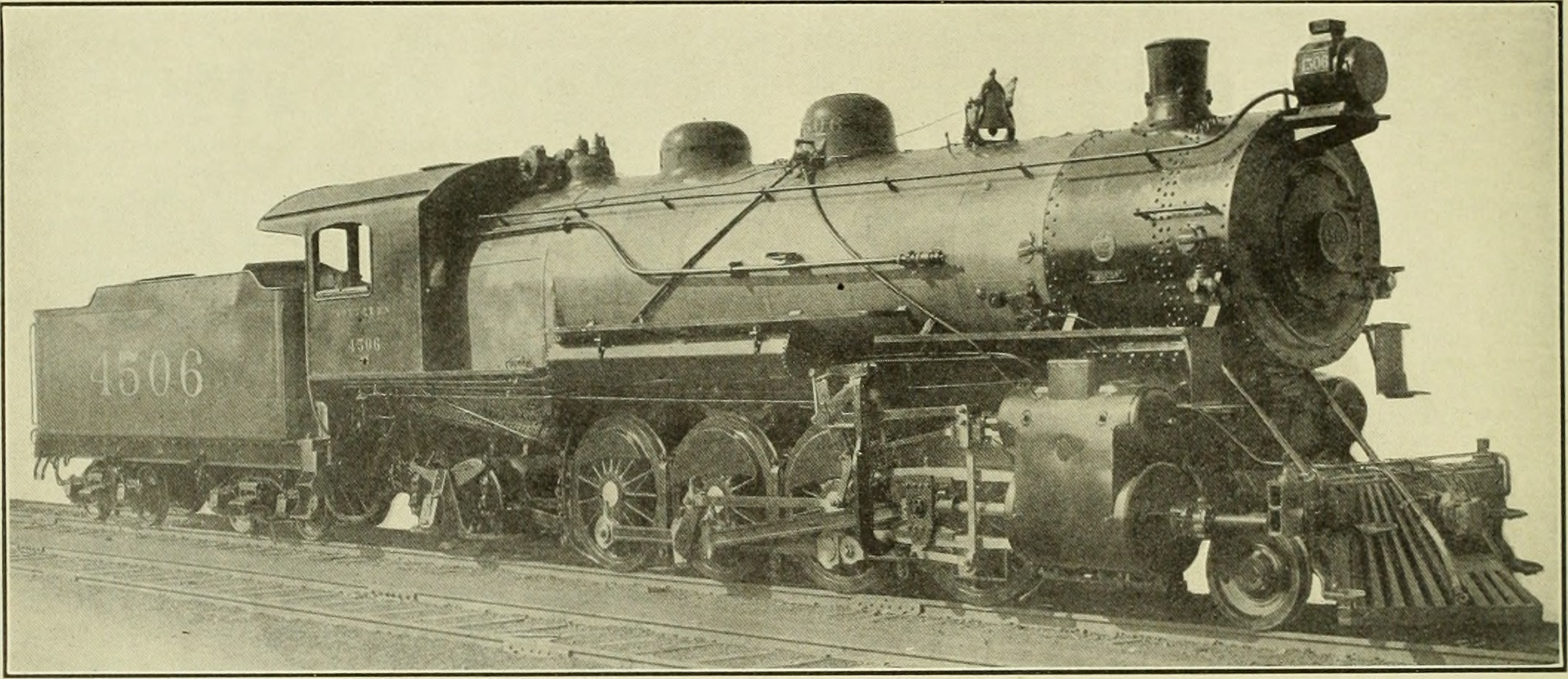
Builder's photograph of fellow Ms class locomotive No. 4506 in 1911. (Note: The locomotive retired around 1949.)

From 1911 to 1917, the Southern Railway (SOU) ordered 182 2-8-2 "Mikado" type Ms class steam locomotives from the Baldwin Locomotive Works (BLW), American Locomotive Company (ALCO), and Lima Locomotive Works (LLW). They were built to replace the 2-8-0 "Consolidation" type K and Ks classes that pulled heavier freight trains. The Ms class locomotives were numbered 4501-4635 for SOU, 6250-6284 for the Cincinnati, New Orleans and Texas Pacific (CNO&TP) division, and 6600-6611 for the Alabama Great Southern (AGS) division. Designed with 63-inch (1,600 mm) diameter driving wheels, 27 in × 30 in (686 mm × 762 mm) cylinders, superheaters, and an operating boiler pressure of 175 psi (1.21 MPa), these locomotives produce 51,625 lbf (229.64 kN) of tractive effort. Their initial tenders could hold 12 tonnes (12,000 kg) of coal and 8,000 US gallons (30,000 L) of water. Most of the Ms locomotives had Walschaerts (Nos. 4501-4603, 4624-4635) and Southern valve gears (Nos. 4604-4623), while the rest of the class had Baker valve gear. In the 1930s and 1940s, most of them were re-equipped with Worthington feedwater heaters, mechanical stokers, larger sand domes, larger tenders, and multiple-bearing crossheads to improve their performances.

No. 4501 was built by BLW in October 1911 at a cost of $23,182, the first of its wheel arrangement type ordered by the SOU. It was first assigned to work in the Washington Division, hauling freight trains between Alexandria and Lynchburg, Virginia. In 1912, the locomotive was moved to the Knoxville Division, based in Bulls Gap, Tennessee. During that time, No. 4501 was photographed along with its crew members for the SOU officials, before being moved within the division to Knoxville, Tennessee, around 1917. In 1926, No. 4501 and 24 of its fellow Ms-class locomotives were moved to Somerset, Kentucky, on SOU's Cincinnati, New Orleans and Texas Pacific (CNO&TP) division to replace the 2-10-2 Ss class locomotives, which were too big for the CNO&TP tunnels. To reduce the amount of smoke inhaled by their crew in the tunnels, No. 4501 and the other Ms-class locomotives were given an air-actuated bonnet smoke deflector. By 1935, No. 4501 was moved to the St. Louis Division, where it was based in Princeton, Indiana. Due to weight restrictions in St. Louis, No. 4501 would only run freight trains from Princeton to Evansville; Huntingburg; and West Baden Springs, Indiana.

During visits to various locomotive shops in Knoxville, Somerset, and Princeton, No. 4501 received numerous modifications, such as the headlight being moved from the top of its front smokebox to the center of its smokebox door. The bell was moved from the top of the boiler to the top front of the smokebox. The long, sharply pointed wooden pilot was replaced with a shorter "boiler tube" style steel pilot to accommodate the locomotive to couple front to front. The manual Johnson bar was removed in favor of the power reverse gear. The ladder steps were added from the pilot beam to the running boards. Its original small round sand dome was replaced with a larger rectangular arched sand dome, mounted behind the stack. The double-guide alligator crossheads were also replaced with the single-guide multiple-bearing crossheads to reduce maintenance. At some point in 1928, No. 4501 visited SOU's Ferguson Shops in Somerset, where its boiler pressure was upgraded to 200 psi (1.38 MPa), which made the locomotive produce 53,900 lbf (239.76 kN) of tractive effort. Unlike most of its fellow Ms class locomotives, SOU did not retrofit No. 4501 with a feedwater heater or a mechanical stoker, because it was regularly assigned to branch line work in the St. Louis Division.

By 1939, SOU began dieselization under President Ernest E. Norris. The first of the Ms class locomotives to be retired that year were Nos. 4502, 4504, 4582, 4588, 4589, 4593, 4604, 4612, and 4633. During 1940, the CNO&TP and St. Louis Divisions were the first of SOU's divisions to be completely dieselized with their brand-new fleet of EMD FT diesels, which resulted in many of the Ms locomotives being reassigned while 14 of them have retired. In July 1948, No. 4501 was retired from revenue service and put up for sale in good condition at SOU's Princeton Shops in Princeton. On October 7 that same year, Kentucky and Tennessee Railway (K&T) General Manager and Master Mechanic L.C. Bruce, who was a former SOU employee, purchased No. 4501 for $8,225 and had it moved under its own power to the K&T in Stearns, Kentucky. The locomotive, renumbered to 12, was deemed capable enough to handle the K&T's ruling 3.5% grade between Oz, Kentucky and the SOU interchange in Stearns, hauling heavy coal trains of 650 tonnes (650,000 kg), compared to K&T's Nos. 10 and 11, which could only haul 490 tonnes (490,000 kg) and 560 tonnes (560,000 kg), respectively. As a result of that, No. 12 was affectionally nicknamed The Big Engine by K&T employees. On June 17, 1953, the last steam-powered freight train arrived into Chattanooga, Tennessee, marking the end of steam on the SOU. The last of No. 4501's fellow Ms locomotives, Nos. 4577 and 4613 were scrapped by September 1953.

=== A new life in preservation ===
The backhead of No. 4501 in late August 2015.

On August 11, 1961, the Tennessee Valley Railroad Museum (TVRM) was founded by DuPont electronic engineer Paul H. Merriman and General Railway Signal Company field representative Robert M. Soule Jr. to preserve and operate obsolete locomotives and rolling stock at a museum in Chattanooga, Tennessee. In February 1964, the K&T purchased three ALCO S-2 diesel locomotives from the Denver and Rio Grande Western, and consequently retired No. 12 and its other steam locomotives. Merriman jumped at the chance to purchase the No. 12 locomotive for his newly-formed 4501 Corporation for $5,000 of his own money. He also spent another $2,000 on spare parts. Merriman made plans to bring No. 12 back to Chattanooga under its own power, but SOU President D.W. Brosnan did not want a steam locomotive run on SOU trackage. Merriman enlisted the help of W. Graham Claytor Jr., an SOU vice-president of law and a steam locomotive enthusiast, who persuaded Brosnan to grant one-time approval. Merriman and Soule had No. 12 renumbered as 4501, then refurbished with the help of TVRM volunteers.

On June 6, 1964, No. 4501 moved under its own power via the CNO&TP line from the K&T to Chattanooga. It pulled a consist containing the Shenandoah Valley lightweight sleeper, gondola No. 117852 outfitted with benches and a roof, and SOU office car No. 6. The engineer at the throttle of the locomotive was Walter C. Dove, a former SOU road foreman of engines in Mississippi. Upon arrival in Chattanooga, No. 4501 underwent an initial restoration by TVRM volunteers at the facilities of the Lucey Boiler Company in Chattanooga near the TVRM's storage facilities, which were located on former Western Union Company trackage at the time.

No. 4501 was disassembled for an extensive Class 3 overhaul, approved by the Interstate Commerce Commission (ICC). This included the thin cab floor, the rotted ash pan, and the rusty smokebox front being replaced. The dented cab roof was straightened, and a radio antenna was installed. The cylinder cocks were reworked, and the throttle was lapped with a new air line run to the repacked reversing gear. The locomotive's headlight was positioned at approximately 3-inch (76 mm) below the center of the smokebox door. Its bell was now hung by a new bracket hanger leaning into the front top of its smokebox, replacing the original bracket platform shelve. Claytor requested to have No. 4501 resplendent in SOU's passenger Sylvan green and gold paint scheme, paying homage to the Ps-4 class 4-6-2 locomotives that were also painted in the livery with corporate blessings from the SOU. (Note: Merriman was a graduate student at Duke University in Durham, North Carolina, and remembers SOU Ps-2 Light Pacific No. 1343, being painted green and pulling a local passenger train from Goldsboro to Greensboro.)

=== First excursion service ===
==== Late 1960s ====
"It's a good thing to let another generation know what a steam locomotive is."

— W. Graham Claytor Jr.

After the restoration work was completed in August 1966, the No. 4501 locomotive hauled its inaugural excursion runs from Chattanooga to Richmond, Virginia, officially kicking off the SOU's new steam excursion program, launched by Brosnan himself per Claytor's request. Dove became No. 4501's regular engineer at the time. It initially departed the Chattanooga Terminal Station on August 18, heading towards Louisville, Kentucky, arriving there on the 19th, where a theater group organized an August 20 excursion from Louisville to Danville, Kentucky for an outdoor drama, before returning to Louisville. This would be the first time a steam locomotive was present in Louisville since 1959, when the Louisville and Nashville (L&N) hosted a centennial excursion with Illinois Central (IC) 4-8-2 No. 2613 pulling it between there and Nashville, Tennessee. No. 4501 then went to Louisville's neighboring New Albany, Indiana, where it pulled two round trip excursions between there and Corydon Junction, Indiana on the 21st and 22nd, under the sponsorship of the Floyd County's Sesquicentennial Commission.

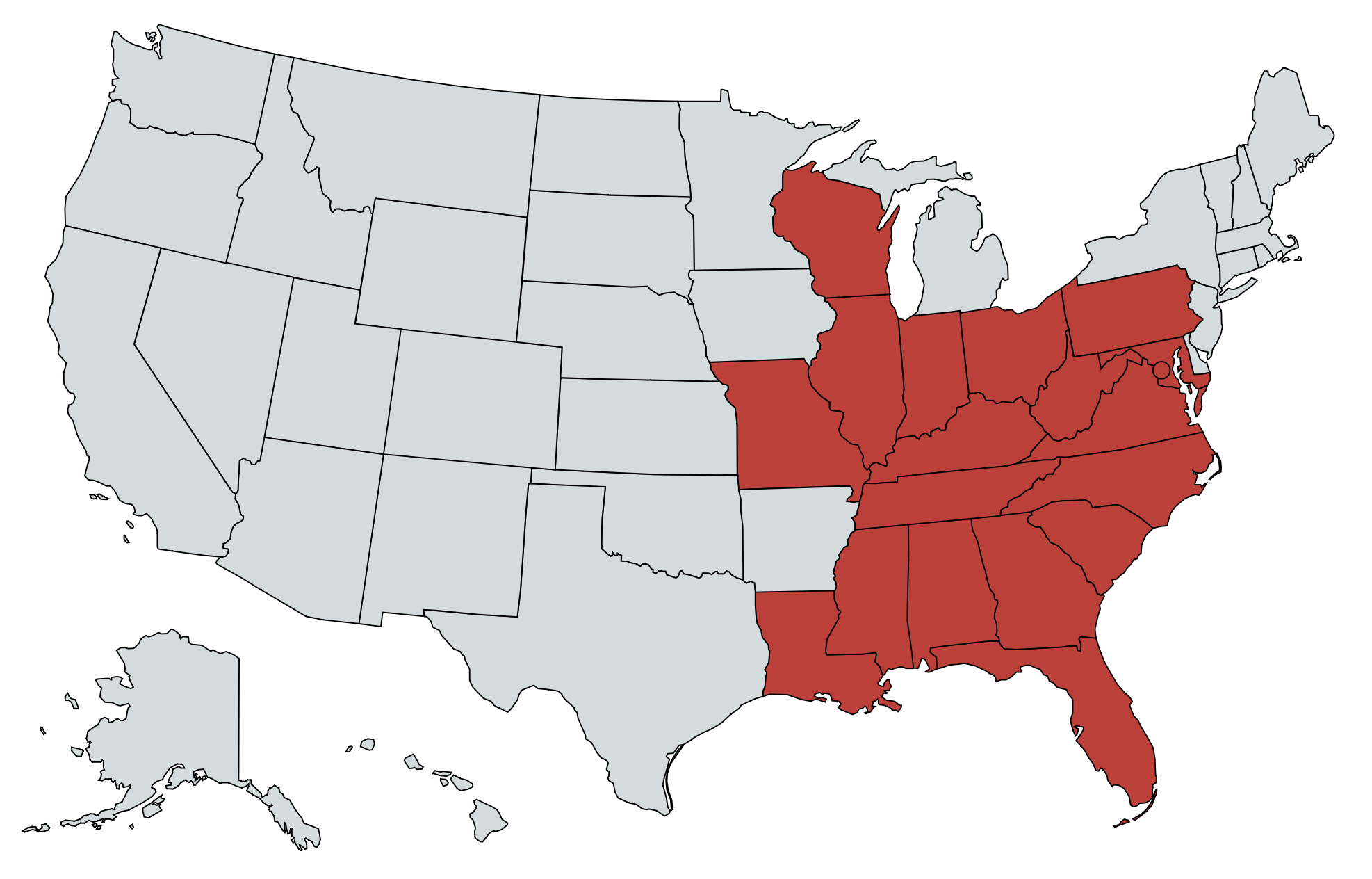
The U.S. states visited by No. 4501 in excursion service.

After its visit in Kentucky and Indiana, No. 4501 continued its journey to Richmond the next day. On the way, No. 4501 received a broken spring saddle on its third driver just north of Somerset, Kentucky in the afternoon. The next morning on August 24, No. 4501 was repaired with a spare spring shipped from the K&T shops in Stearns and continued on. After running via Knoxville, Tennessee; Asheville and Salisbury, North Carolina, the locomotive finally arrived in Richmond on August 26. During its stay in Richmond, No. 4501 pulled two round trip excursions between there and Keysville, Virginia on September 5 and 24, sponsored by the Old Dominion Chapter of the National Railway Historical Society (NRHS). On September 25, No. 4501 pulled another NRHS sponsored round-trip excursion, where it ran between Richmond and Alexandria, Virginia, via Richmond, Fredericksburg and Potomac (RF&P) rails. Before leaving Richmond, No. 4501 became the first steam locomotive to enter the RF&P's Bryan Park Terminal diesel locomotive facility in the Acca Yard, where it was getting its pony truck journals repaired. It then headed to Washington, D.C., to haul the October 1 and 2 round trip excursions between there and Front Royal, Virginia. (Note: During its time, No. 4501 temporarily swapped out its usual SOU Princeton steptop 3-chime whistle in favor of a long-bell 3-chime "steamboat" whistle, which came from Ps-4 No. 1401 that was also on display at the Smithsonian's Museum of History and Technology in Washington, D.C.) On October 8, No. 4501 left Washington, D.C. on its deadhead run back to Chattanooga. At Lynchburg, Virginia, it transferred over to the Norfolk and Western (N&W) rails, where the locomotive stopped in Roanoke, Virginia to be serviced at the Shaffer's Crossing engine terminal and stayed there for the night. The next day, it continued its journey and arrived back in Chattanooga on October 15. Throughout the 1966 excursion season, No. 4501 ran 2,809.7 miles (4,521.8 km), carrying 5,090 revenue riders, and grossed at $14,415.

In the spring of 1967, the locomotive returned to the Lucey Boiler Company for routine repairs and upgrades. This would include upgrading its tender coal bunker for greater fuel capacity from 12 tonnes (12,000 kg) to 16 tonnes (16,000 kg), replacing the arch tubes, and installing a new adjustable draft sheet. On May 20, No. 4501 entered its second excursion season, pulling a Steam Mystery Trip excursion from Chattanooga to Attalla, Alabama and return. On June 3-4, the locomotive traveled to Cincinnati, Ohio, where it pulled a round-trip excursion between there and Lexington, Kentucky on the 11th. Afterwards, No. 4501 traveled to Atlanta, Georgia on July 1, where it pulled the Atlanta Chapter of the NRHS' Georgia Peach Special round-trip excursion between there and Macon, Georgia, covering it for ex-Savannah and Atlanta (S&A) 4-6-2 No. 750, which was under repair at the time. On July 15, the locomotive traveled to Birmingham, Alabama, where it ran Heart of Dixie Railroad Club sponsored loop trip excursions via Wilton; Childersburg; Talladega; and Anniston, Alabama on the 22nd and 23rd.

No. 4501's current tender at TVRM's East Chattanooga Yard on September 4, 2026.

In late November 1967, No. 4501 returned to the K&T shops in Stearns for a further overhaul. Also at that time, Brosnan retired and selected Claytor as the next president of the SOU railway. On December 8, Claytor, determined to expand the steam program, traded a pair of ex-Central of Georgia (CG) ALCO RS-3s for a pair of ex-SOU Ks-1 class locomotives Nos. 207 and 208 from the East Tennessee and Western North Carolina Railroad (ET&WNC). The two Ks-1 class locomotives were renumbered back to 630 and 722, respectively. Claytor hired his close colleague, General Counsel James "Jim" Bistline as General Manager of the steam program and former Atlanta Division roundhouse foreman Bill Purdie as the Master Mechanic of steam locomotives. With that, Claytor also converted the little-use diesel locomotive facility building at the Norris Yard in Irondale, Alabama, into a steam locomotive repair facility to provide adequate maintenance for Nos. 4501, 630, 722, and 750.

For the remainder of 1968 season, Nos. 630 and 750 covered the excursion program for No. 4501, but No. 722 was not running due to a cracked firebox. In late November that year, No. 4501 returned to service and went back to Chattanooga. Around 1969, SOU upgraded No. 4501 with a larger ex-CG tender No. 32863. The tender had originally been used behind 2-10-2 No. 773, which was originally built by LLW for the IC as their No. 2603. After arriving on the CG around 1926, No. 773's tender was lengthen with the coal capacity upgraded from 15 tonnes (15,000 kg) to 18 tonnes (18,000 kg). The water tank was also increased from 9,000 US gallons (34,000 L) to 12,500 US gallons (47,000 L). Following the loss of No. 773 in a boiler explosion at Bolingbroke, Georgia, on June 1, 1947, the tender was then used for a maintenance-of-way wreck train. The new tender significantly improved No. 4501's range and allowed it to accommodate longer distance runs. In November 2 that year, during the 75th anniversary of the SOU, No. 4501 participated in an event called the Steam-O-Rama took place in Anniston, Alabama, on the Birmingham-Atlanta mainline. It also featured No. 750 and ex-London and North Eastern Railway (LNER) A3 class 4-6-2 No. 4472 Flying Scotsman, which was in the course of its US tour at the time.

==== 1970s ====
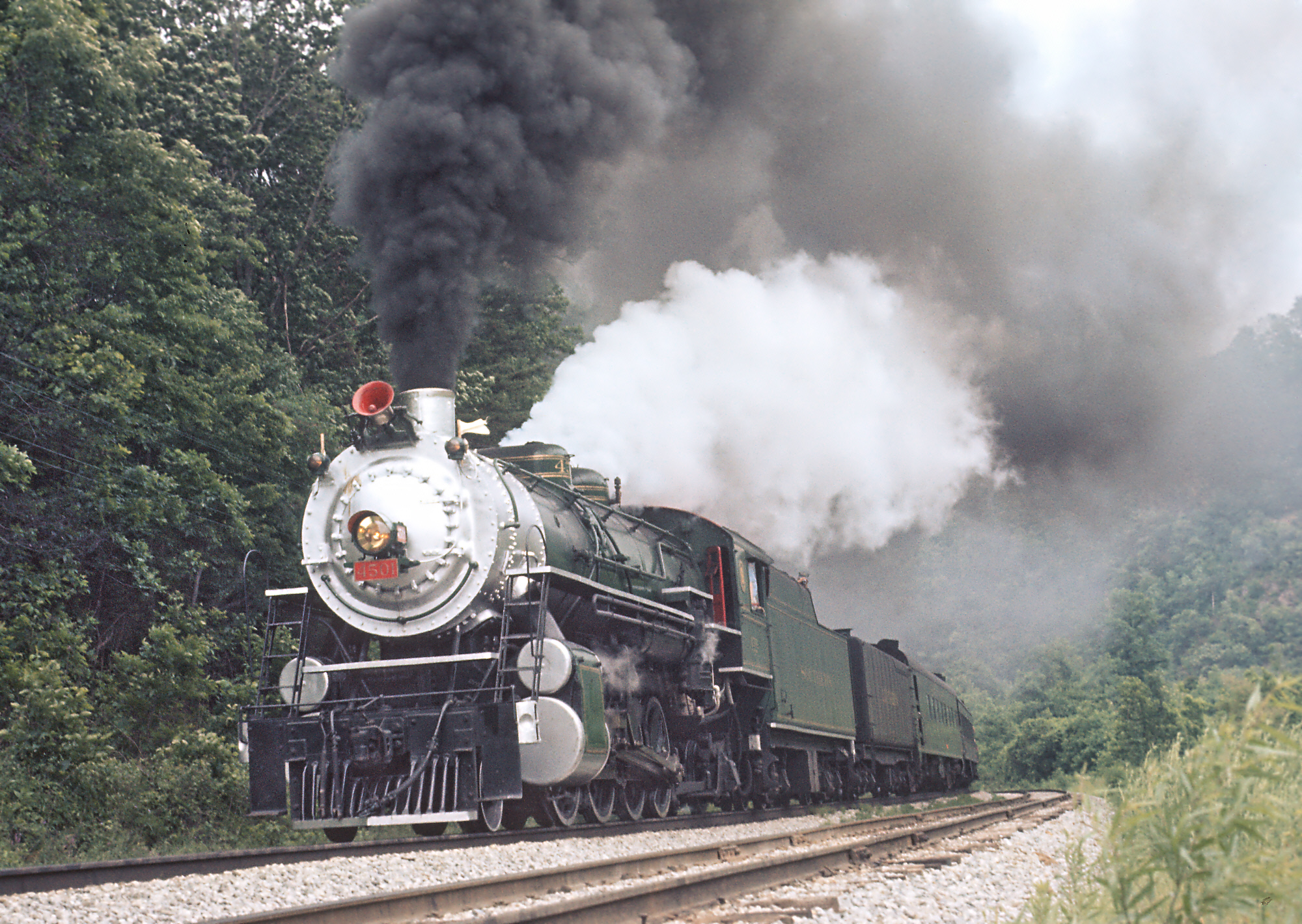
No. 4501 leading the Smoky Mountain Special excursion near Paint Rock, North Carolina, May 30, 1970.

During June 1970, No. 4501 pulled more round-trip excursions out of Louisville and Cincinnati to Danville on the 13th-14th and Lexington on the 27th-28th, respectively. It also pulled round-trip excursions between St. Louis, Missouri and Mount Vernon, Indiana on the 20th-21st. No. 722 was also placed into excursion service with a new firebox and repainted in the same livery that No. 4501 wore as both locomotives participated with No. 630 in Charleston, South Carolina, for the Charleston Chapter of the NRHS convention during September that year. (Note: Also participating in the event was SOU's replica of the Best Friend of Charleston and the Charleston Chapter's ex-Hampton and Branchville 4-6-0 No. 44.) On November 18, No. 4501 participated at the dedication of TVRM's new site at North Chamberlain Avenue in East Chattanooga. Afterwards, on December 5, No. 4501 pulled a TVRM-sponsored excursion from Chattanooga to Birmingham, where a diesel locomotive would take over for the return trip. This excursion was called the Birmingham Special in honor of SOU's namesake passenger train, which was the last one to serve Chattanooga. Throughout the 1971 excursion season, Nos. 4501 and 630 were under major repairs at the Norris Yard Steam Shop, while Nos. 722 and 750 handled most of the excursions. In 1972, No. 4501 was back in service and on July 8, it challenged the Saluda Grade, pulling three coaches and an open-air gondola.

Throughout the summer of 1973, at the request of Trains magazine editor David P. Morgan and officials from the Chicago and North Western (C&NW), No. 4501 visited the upper Midwestern United States to haul a series of excursions on trackage owned by the C&NW, the Milwaukee Road (MILW), the IC, the Rock Island (RI), and the N&W's former Nickel Plate Road (NKP) and Wabash (WAB). Arrangements were also made for No. 4501 to lead that year's Schlitz Circus World Museum (CWM) train on June 29, on the CN&W main line between Baraboo and Madison, Wisconsin, and on the MILW main line to Milwaukee. (Note: This was the final time a steam locomotive pulled the CWM's train before the annual Circus event was halted for a twelve-year hiatus.) The SOU allowed the CWM to use the locomotive free of charge. From July 4 to 9, No. 4501 hauled the NRHS' Roanoke Chapter's first annual Independence Limited excursion from Chicago to Washington, D.C., and during that journey, it traveled over N&W and Western Maryland (WM) trackage. In late August that year, Nos. 4501 and 722 traveled to New Orleans, Louisiana, where both locomotives haul an NRHS sponsored round-trip excursion between there and Pascagoula, Mississippi via L&N trackage on September 2. This was made hours before Hurricane Delia occurred. (Note: No. 722 also hauled two round-trip excursions between New Orleans and Slidell, Louisiana on September 3.)

In 1975, Merriman donated the title of No. 4501 from his personal property to TVRM. From late May to July 1976, Nos. 4501 and 630 went to Alexandria, Virginia, hauling US bicentennial excursion trips out of there to Calverton; Charlottesville; Front Royal; and Warrenton, Virginia. The consists were so large that both locomotives would often double head. In 1977, Claytor retired from the SOU, and his successor Stanley Crane kept the steam program going, since it earned high investments for the railway's stockholders. In the spring of the same year, No. 4501 was photographed in front of the Norris Yard Steam Shop alongside No. 722 and American Freedom Train–operated locomotives Texas and Pacific (T&P) 2-10-4 No. 610 and Southern Pacific (SP) 4-8-4 No. 4449. No. 610 was now being leased by SOU to accommodate their longer and heavier excursion consists, (Note: SOU initially offered to lease No. 4449 for their steam program, but the American Freedom Train Foundation had to decline, due to their obligation to return the locomotive to its home base in Portland, Oregon.) and Canadian Pacific (CP) 4-6-4 Royal Hudson No. 2839 was later added, while No. 630 was retired and leased to TVRM in late 1978. On September 1, 1977, No. 4501 travelled from Durham, North Carolina to Roanoke, Virginia, to participate in that year's NRHS Convention. Two days later, No. 4501 hauled a NRHS doubleheader excursion behind No. 610 on the N&W from Roanoke to Lynchburg. Upon arrival, No. 4501 hauled eleven cars solo on the SOU main line to Altavista, and then it returned to Roanoke via N&W's former Virginian trackage. Another doubleheader excursion with No. 610 was planned to run to Charlottesville on September 5, but pilot truck issues sidelined No. 610 in Roanoke, and No. 4501 had to haul the excursion with two diesel locomotives. On March 28, 1979, No. 4501 became listed on the National Register of Historic Places (NRHP).

==== 1980s ====
One of No. 4501's original tires, which was removed during its overhaul from 1981 to 1984.

In 1980, Harold H. Hall succeeded Crane and was indifferent with the steam program, and while he allowed it to proceed, the steam fleet was partially downsized. No. 722 was retired from mainline service, Nos. 610 and 2839 were returned to their respective owners, and ex-Chesapeake and Ohio (C&O) 2-8-4 No. 2716 was leased as a replacement for the latter two, but No. 4501 remained. On April 11, 1981, No. 4501 broke down with a cracked front flue sheet at Dalton, Georgia, while hauling an excursion trip from Atlanta to Chattanooga. A diesel locomotive hauled the remainder of the trip, while No. 4501 was towed to the Norris Yard Steam Shop for a long-term rebuild. With No. 4501 absent, the majority of the 1981 season occurred without steam power, and SOU substituted three and sometimes four EMD FP7 diesels to pull their excursions. (Note: The SOU also briefly leased ex-Canadian Pacific 4-6-2 No. 1238 from the Allegany Central Railroad to pull a pair of round-trip excursions between Alexandria and Front Royal in June.) Nearing the end of 1981, SOU debuted No. 2716, and it served the steam program until mid-1982, when it was sidelined by firebox issues. That same year, SOU merged with the N&W to form Norfolk Southern (NS) with Graham's brother Robert being NS' initial president and having ex-N&W J class 4-8-4 No. 611 restored and handling the longer excursion trains. Also at the end of that same year, Purdie retired after leading the restoration of No. 611, and his assistant Doug Karhan took over.

On November 11, 1984, No. 4501 returned to active service with a newly-welded tender tank with the water tank capacity increased to 13,000 US gallons (49,000 L). The tender's former Andrews pilot trucks were replaced with modern roller bearing trucks. The locomotive was also upgraded with a 26L brake stand to accommodate quick repairs and parts replacement. It was also given a newly fabricated front smokebox plate. On November 17 and 18 that year, No. 4501 pulled a pair of New Orleans Chapter NRHS sponsored round-trip excursions between New Orleans and Hattiesburg, Mississippi.

During 1985, the locomotive made unusual round-trip excursions from Goldsboro to New Bern, North Carolina on June 2 and from Knoxville to Middlesboro, Kentucky through the Cumberland Gap on June 8 and 9. The North Carolina excursion included street running through downtown New Bern on the Atlantic and East Carolina subsidiary. On June 22, No. 4501 successfully pulled a loop-trip excursion between Charlotte and Columbia, South Carolina with the return trip running via Spartanburg, South Carolina. But on the second run of the excursion the next day, the locomotive broke down due to a rod nut flew off during the return trip, running on a desolate stretch of track near the Broad River and being several miles northwest of Columbia. The train waited for hours until a pair of diesels arrive to rescue the train. (Note: Robert Claytor was running the excursion that day.) No. 4501 was repaired and continued to run more excursions. After running excursions in New Orleans during mid-November that year, the locomotive was retired from mainline excursion service and confined to TVRM, due to NS now running No. 611 and restoring larger ex-N&W A class 2-6-6-4 No. 1218. In late May 1989, No. 4501 was re-activated and briefly returned to NS rails to pull the Bowater Tennessean excursion from TVRM to Calhoun, Tennessee, sponsored by the Bowater Corporation in Charleston, Tennessee, which was nearby Calhoun.

==== 1990s ====
In early 1991, it received new boiler flues and a new coat of green paint, completed in June 23. Afterwards, No. 4501 returned to mainline excursion service with NS to operate on trackage that was off limits to the two ex-N&W locomotives. TVRM sent No. 4501 to Asheville, where it pulled round-trip excursions between there and Bulls Gap, Tennessee on June 26, 29 and 30. On November 2 that year, during the 25th anniversary of the SOU/NS steam program, No. 4501 was tasked to haul a round-trip excursion between Chattanooga and Hollywood, Alabama, via CSX trackage. The next day, it led with Nos. 611 and 1218 on an excursion train of 28 cars from Chattanooga to Atlanta. At Ooltewah, Tennessee, No. 4501 was uncoupled from the two N&W locomotives, who uncoupled their tool cars away from the consist for No. 4501 to take the first eight coaches off for a complete round trip back to Chattanooga, turning around at Cleveland, Tennessee. Concurrently, Nos. 611 and 1218 recoupled their tool cars back to the other 18 cars and completed the rest of the one-way trip to Atlanta. (Note: No. 4501 was about to go back to New Orleans to haul round-trip excursions between there and Hattiesburg on November 23 and 24, 1991. However, this was cancelled due to circumstances.) Whenever No. 4501 was not doing any mainline excursions, it was used on TVRM's weekend short-mileage Missionary Ridge Local excursions, running on the former East Tennessee, Virginia and Georgia Railway (ETV&G) route between TVRM's Grand Junction Station and the East Chattanooga Yard, through the pre-Civil War Whiteside Tunnel.

During the 1992 season, with No. 611 still operating and No. 1218 out of service for an overhaul, No. 4501 pulled excursions out of Johnson City, Tennessee to Asheville on May 3, Asheville to Knoxville on September 12-13, Huntsville, Alabama to Chattanooga on October 3-4, and Greenville, South Carolina to Atlanta on October 17 and Columbia, South Carolina on October 18. Also on October 8-9 that year, the locomotive along with the out-of-service Nos. 630 and 722 were photographed at TVRM's East Chattanooga yard. In early May 1993, No. 4501 hauled round-trip excursions out of Kingsport, Tennessee to Appalachia, Virginia on the 1st and Richlands, Virginia on the 2nd. In July that year, it led the NRHS Roanoke Chapter's 19th annual Independence Limited excursion from Knoxville to Richlands, where No. 611 would take it to Fort Wayne, Indiana for Nickel Plate Road (NKP) Nos. 587 and 765 to complete the excursion's journey to Chicago.

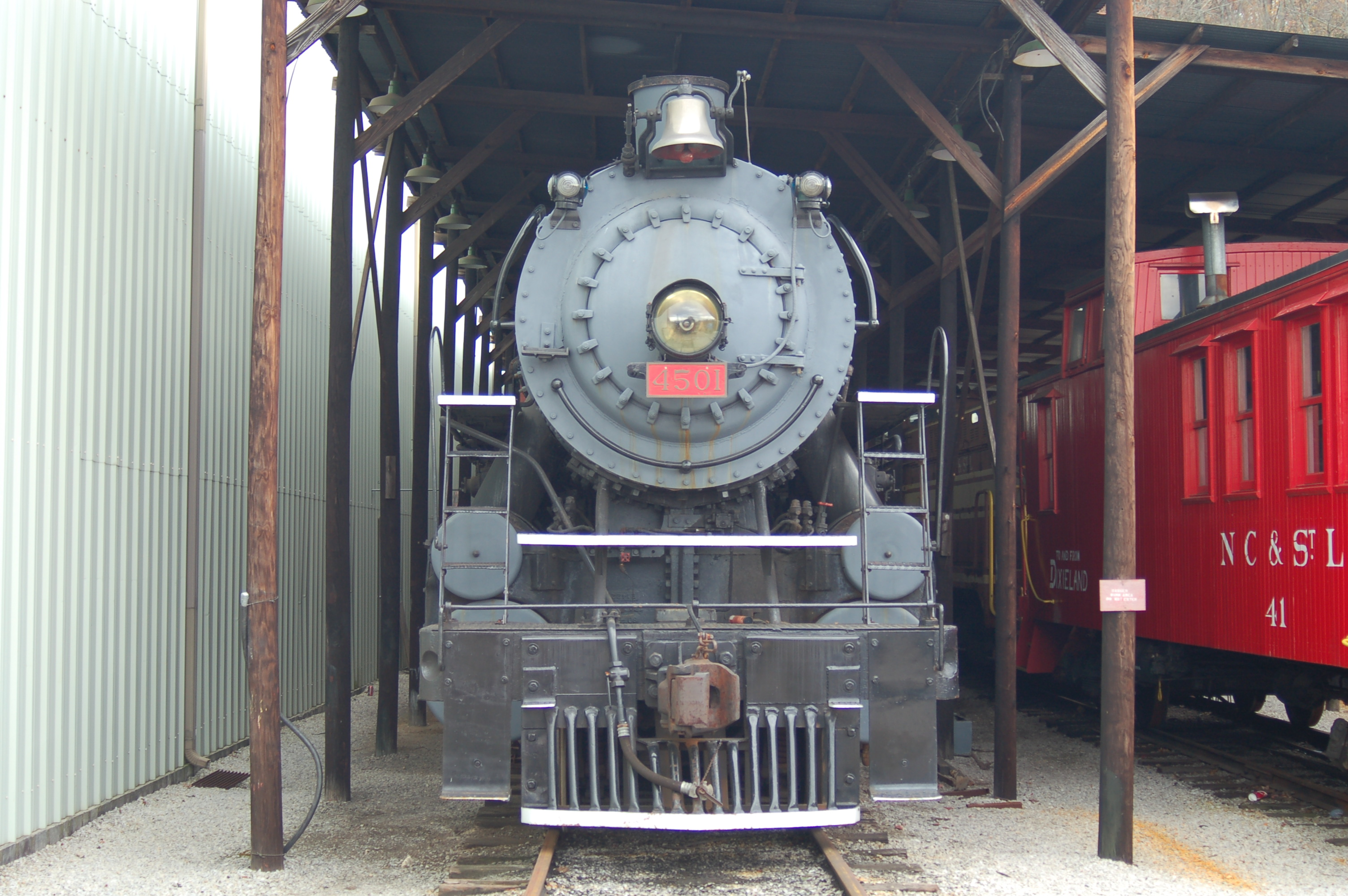
No. 4501 in storage at TVRM's Soule Shops in 2006, after its retirement in 1998.

On April 30, 1994, No. 4501 hauled an NS mainline excursion trip out of Birmingham, and it was planned to arrive at Columbus, Georgia, but it was taken off at Alexander City, Alabama, due to overheated bearings, and NS GP59 diesel locomotive No. 4610 finished the rest of the trip. No. 4501 was repaired at the Norris Yard Steam Shop and returned to TVRM on May 25, to have its bearings repaired. (Note: The locomotive was meant to take part in the Atlanta Chapter NRHS convention's Steam'n Thru Georgia event in late June 1994. It would have pulled a June 25 round-trip excursion between Atlanta and Athens, Georgia with assisting diesels and then led the June 26 finale excursion with No. 611 and ex-Frisco (SLSF) 4-8-2 No. 1522, from Atlanta to Rome, Georgia, where the excursion consist was divided with No. 4501 and the assisting diesels leading 11 round-trip excursion cars back to Atlanta, while Nos. 611 and 1522 pulled the 11 one-way excursion cars up to Chattanooga. But with No. 4501 undergoing heavy maintenance at TVRM, No. 611 led the June 25 excursion and the diesels pulled the June 26 Atlanta-Rome excursion.) In October that same year, NS executives announced that they would discontinue their steam program due to serious safety concerns, rising insurance costs, the expense of maintaining steam locomotives, and decreasing rail network availability from a surge in freight traffic. (Note: There were two planned round-trip excursions scheduled for No. 4501 to pull out of Chattanooga to Oneida, Tennessee on October 14 and 15. But ex-U.S. Army 2-8-0 No. 610 filled those in. No. 4501's other intended round-trip excursion between Chattanooga and Huntsville, Alabama, scheduled on October 22, were filled by NS diesels. There was another round-trip excursion scheduled for No. 4501 to pull between Bristol, Virginia to Knoxville, Tennessee on October 30, but this was also filled in by the NS diesels at the last moment.) On December 3, 1994, the last steam-powered NS excursion, hauled by No. 611, ran from Birmingham to Chattanooga and back.

No. 4501 remained at the TVRM while the NS steam program ended, and its bearing repairs were subsequently completed, while its smokestack and petticoat pipe were replaced. On October 7, 1995, No. 4501 returned to service and began to haul the museum's excursion trains to Summerville, Georgia through the Northwest Georgia mountains on the Chattooga and Chickamauga Railway shortline. In October 1996, the locomotive was repainted back to its original freight black livery for TVRM's 35th anniversary. It continued to operate until its last runs on September 19 and 20, 1998, due to the expiration of its Federal Railroad Administration (FRA) boiler safety certificate on September 30 that year.

During inspection, No. 4501's foundation ring was worn out with the backhead cracked and bearing issues causing the driving boxes to overheat. TVRM quickly determined that the locomotive would need a thorough rebuild to obtain a new boiler flue time, and at the time, they did not have sufficient funding. By 1999, No. 4501 was under semi-retirement while the museum concentrated their efforts and investment on rebuilding No. 630, which was recently donated by NS. Another locomotive, TVRM's other 2-8-0, ex-U.S. Army No. 610 subsequently covered the museum's excursion schedules.

==== Second excursion service ====
In 2009, a group of donors paid $10,000 for TVRM to begin their effort to rebuild the No. 4501 locomotive by moving it into their Soule Shops for a boiler survey and thorough inspection. In June 2010, then NS chairman Wick Moorman announced that NS would run excursions with Nos. 4501 and 630, as part of the new 21st Century Steam program. In 2011, with No. 630 already in operating condition, the restoration of No. 4501 began in earnest. Additionally, No. 4501's original tender was rebuilt with a new water tank capacity of 10,000 US gal (38,000 L; 8,300 imp gal) and a new usage behind No. 630. Then TVRM member Shane Meador served as the Restoration Project Manager, while Jason Sobczynski volunteered to become the Lead Restoration Project Contractor and Co-Project Manager of the locomotive's restoration.

During the restoration work, the cracked backhead was removed and the crew discover that the rigid staybolts for the firebox side sheets need replacements. The locomotive's tender bunker was modified with an HT mechanical stoker auger from Canadian National 5288, a 4-6-2 steam locomotive that was also on display at TVRM, but would later be sold to the Colebrookdale Railroad in 2023. The stoker engine, which ran the stoker auger, was mounted underneath the locomotive's cab on the fireman's side just like the other Ms class locomotives. The cab floor had to be raised in order to fit the stoker. The TVRM crew and Diversified Rail Services made a replacement backhead on the museum's McCabe flanger to replace the cracked one. Additionally, the new backhead have already been formed with the original firedoor hole so a new flush patch was cut in and sized up to fit the HT stoker. Before the new backhead was fitted, the new firebox sheets were fitted first and welded in.

A reproduced Worthington SA type feedwater heater from a China Railway (CR) 2-10-2 QJ Class was installed on No. 4501 to improve the locomotive's performance. This modification eliminated the need to make flush patch repairs on the dome course and increasing the locomotive's operating boiler pressure to 205 psi (1.41 MPa), which created a slight increase in tractive effort. No. 4501 also received upgrades to its trailing wheels that included the addition of roller bearings to help guide the locomotive through curved tracks. The Armstrong lubricators that spring-loaded the driving wheels were replenished by an automatic lubricator from the North Yorkshire Moors Railway in North Yorkshire, England. A new throttle lever was cast and machined. (Note: No. 4501 shared the same throttle design as Nos. 630 and 722.)

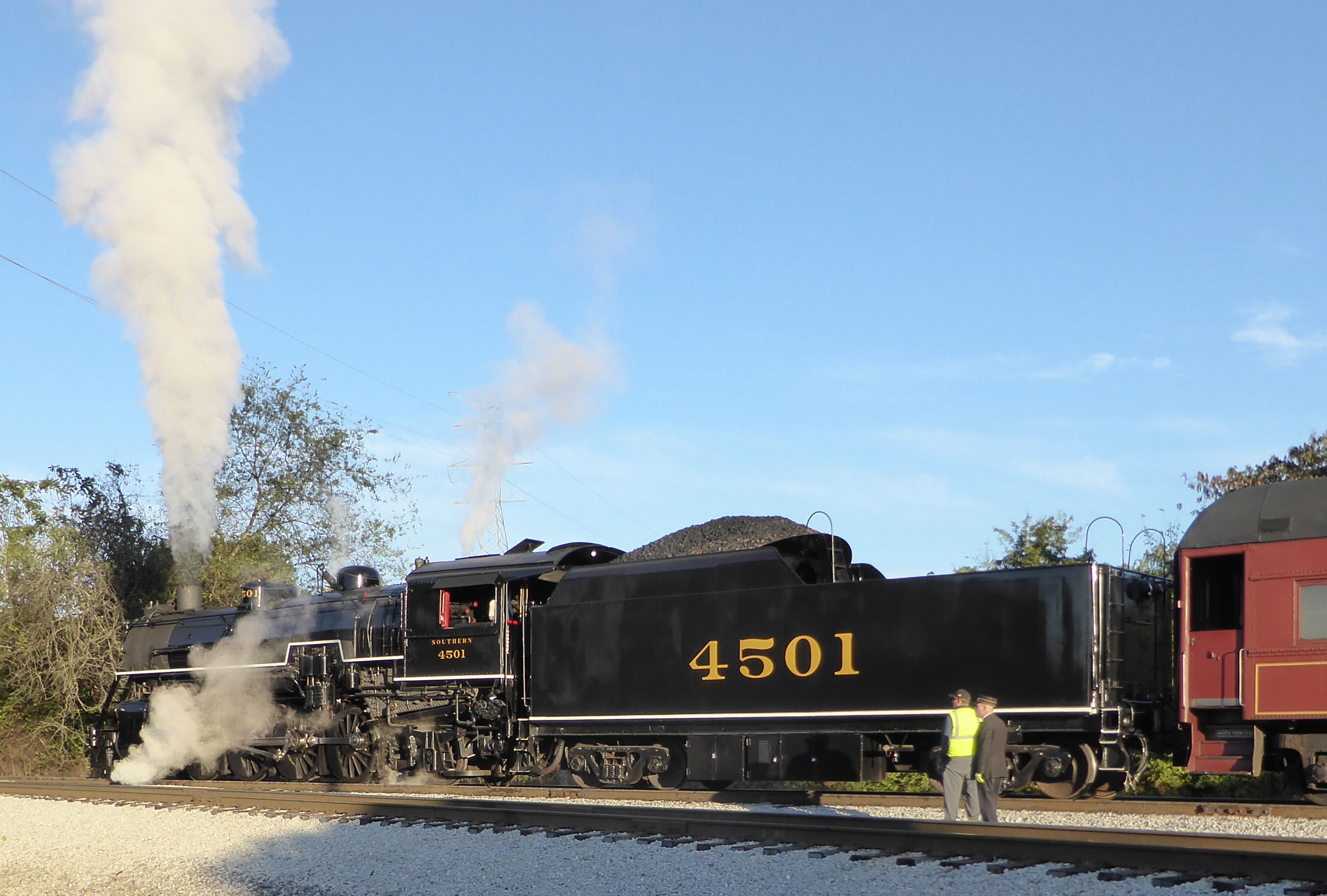
No. 4501 preparing to depart the Grand Junction Station with the Summerville Steam Special excursion, October 4, 2014.

On March 5, 2014, No. 4501 was steamed up and went under a stationary steam test. On September 6, it moved under its own power for the first time in 18 years, and made its debut at TVRM's 2014 Railfest. The locomotive made a test run from Chattanooga to LaFayette, Georgia, on the Chattooga and Chickamauga Railway line on September 25, in preparation for TVRM's scheduled Summerville Steam Special excursions on October 4, 11, 18, 25 & 26 and November 1, 2 & 8 that year. It also double-headed with No. 630 on the November 8 excursion.

On May 1, 2015, No. 4501 returned to the NS mainline for the first time in 21 years and successfully completed a test round trip from TVRM to Cleveland, Tennessee. On June 26, No. 4501 began to participate in the 21st Century Steam program, running the Radford Rambler excursion from Bristol to Radford, Virginia. On June 27, the locomotive pulled the Lonesome Pine Special excursion from Bristol to Bulls Gap, Tennessee, and ran the Radford Rambler again the next day. On September 12 and 13, No. 4501 hauled a round trip excursion from Chattanooga to Cleveland, during TVRM's 2015 Railfest. On September 26 and 27 that year, the locomotive hauled the Nancy Hanks Special round-trip excursion from Macon to Tennille, Georgia.

No. 4501 was planned to run the Piedmont Limited round-trip excursion from Atlanta to Toccoa, Georgia, on October 3 and 4, 2015, but it was canceled on October 2 due to Hurricane Joaquin, making the locomotive's career for the 21st Century Steam program short-lived. No. 4501 left NS rails and returned to TVRM. NS officially ended their 21st Century Steam program and No. 4501 remained at TVRM to continue pulling the Missionary Ridge Local and Summerville Steam Special excursions. It also ran the first Summerville Steam Special excursion on March 4, 2017, in the spring season.

In September 2019, No. 4501 was masqueraded to look like an L&N J-3 Mikado class steam locomotive for the Louisville & Nashville Railroad Historical Society annual convention. It was equipped with a larger Sunbeam type headlight, which was from L&N 2-8-0 No. 1301 and on loan from the Kentucky Steam Heritage Corporation (KSHC), the current owner of No. 2716. While the L&N numbered their fleet of 93 J-3 Mikados from 1500 to 1592, No. 4501 was renumbered to 1593 with the road number painted on the lens, which was a common tradition for L&N steam locomotives. (Note: No. 4501 was also equipped with a L&N 3-chime freight style whistle, which was also on loan from the KSHC.) On September 7, 2024, the locomotive was temporarily masqueraded as Gulf, Mobile and Ohio No. 4382, as part of a Founder's Day night photo session. Around September 2025, No. 4501 was masqueraded again as Central of Georgia No. 699, as part of a Founder's Day daytime photo session.

"We're excited to see 4501 return to this iconic paint scheme for at least the next year."

— Shane Wilson, president and co-founder of ScaleTrains

In early 2026, it was announced that No. 4501 would once again wear the SOU Sylvan green paint scheme for the first time since 1996 with contribution from ScaleTrains, a model train company based in Cleveland, Tennessee, who lead the repainting. This was made to celebrate 60 years of the original SOU/NS steam program, 65 years of TVRM, and 115 years since the locomotive was built by BLW. It unveiled on May 23 when the locomotive pulled its usual weekend Summerville Steam Special duties. (Note: Originally intended to be unveiled on May 9, but pushed back due to the repainting work being done outdoors and the uncontrolled weather climate delayed it. No. 4501 broke down due to a jammed closed throttle during the return trip of the May 23 Summerville Steam Special excursion, and both the locomotive and the train were retrieved by TVRM's ex-TAG EMD GP38 diesel No. 80.) On Wednesday, July 29, 2026, No. 4501 pulled a private Missionary Ridge Local morning excursion and participating a nighttime photo session at TVRM's East Chattanooga Yard for the National Model Railroad Association's (NRMA) 2026 Scenic City Express National Convention. The next day, it pulled a ScaleTrains sponsored Summerville Steam Special excursion. It will supposedly return to its traditional freight black livery around 2027.

== Appearances in media ==
- During October 1970, No. 4501 went to Moundsville, West Virginia to be filmed for the 1971 film Fools' Parade in which it was repainted to resemble a Baltimore and Ohio (B&O) steam locomotive.
- No. 4501 is shown while under steam in the 1974 film Ridin' the Rails: The Great American Train Story. A clip of this movie, with Johnny Cash at the throttle of the locomotive, was used in the music video for Hurt, which was covered by Cash.
- In August 1975, No. 4501 was filmed for the 1976 television film Eleanor and Franklin, renumbered as No. 1409 to represent one of the Ps-4 locomotives pulling the funeral train of U.S. President Franklin D. Roosevelt in 1945.
- In November 1975, No. 4501 along with No. 630 went to Hattiesburg, Mississippi, where they were filmed for the 1977 CBS television film Minstrel Man.
- No. 4501 appeared several times in the 1978 film Summer of My German Soldier, set in Georgia during World War II.
- On January 22, 1979, No. 4501 along with some SOU passenger cars were all filmed at the former Terminal Station in Macon, Georgia for the Wise Blood film.
- No. 4501 appeared in the 1985 film The Color Purple, where it ran on the Winston-Salem Southbound (WSS) line in Central North Carolina, pulling a set of heavyweight passenger cars wearing the Panama Limited emblems with actress Whoopi Goldberg standing at the rear of the train.
- In late March 1998, No. 4501 was repainted with N&W letterings and it was ferried by NS diesels to Harriman; Oliver Springs; and Lake City, Tennessee on Tennessee Valley Authority (TVA) trackage for filming of the 1999 film October Sky, which was directed by Joe Johnston. Railroad photographer O. Winston Link made a cameo appearance in the film as the engineer running No. 4501. TVRM General Manager George Walker supervised Link on how to run the locomotive during filming.
- No. 4501 was the subject of the 2016 feature-length documentary And Then There Was One, which chronicles the history of the locomotive's career to that point.

== See also ==
- Baltimore and Ohio 4500
- Grand Canyon Railway 4960
- Grand Trunk Western 4070
- Nashville, Chattanooga and St. Louis 576
- Nickel Plate Road 587
- Soo Line 1003

== Bibliography ==
- Boyd, Jim (2000). The Steam Locomotive: A Century of North American Classics (1st ed.). Barnes & Noble. ISBN 0-7607-1627-7.
- Coniglio, John (2025). Steam in the Valley: A history of the Tennessee Valley Railroad Museum Volume 1, 1961-1998 (3rd ed.). Tennessee Valley Railroad Museum. LCCN 97-70709.
- Davis, Burke (1985). The Southern Railway: Roads of the Innovators (1st ed.). University of North Carolina Press. ISBN 0-8078-1636-1.
- Drury, George (2015). Guide to North American Steam Locomotives (2nd ed.). Kalmbach Publishing. ISBN 978-1-62700-259-2.
- Morgan, David P. (1968). Locomotive 4501 (1st ed.). Kalmbach Publishing. ASIN B0006BW4DO.
- Nelson, Bruce (2013). America's Greatest Circus Train (1st ed.). Heimburger House Publishing Company. ISBN 978-0-911581-64-5.
- Prince, Richard E. (1970). Steam Locomotives and Boats: Southern Railway System (2nd ed.). Wheelwright Lithographing Company. ISBN 0-9600088-4-5.
- Ranks, Harold; Lowe, Shelby (1966). Southern Steam Power (1st ed.). Barnhart Press.
- Ray, G. Mark (May 2014). "Secrets of a Steam Star". Trains. Vol. 74, no. 5. Kalmbach Publishing. pp. 18–27.
- Walker, Alan A. (2003). Railroads of Chattanooga. Images of Rail (1st ed.). Arcadia Publishing. ISBN 978-0-7385-1539-7.
- Wrinn, Jim (August 1991). "Steam-powered public relations". Trains. Vol. 74, no. 5. Kalmbach Publishing. pp. 30–44.
- Wrinn, Jim (2000). Steam's Camelot: Southern and Norfolk Southern Excursions in Color (1st ed.). TLC Publishing. ISBN 1-883089-56-5.
