= Hard On (video) =

Video by Frankie Goes to Hollywood
- Released: 13 November 2000
- Recorded: 1983–1987
- Genre: Compilation
- Length: 125 mins
- Label: ZTT

Hard On is a 14-track music video compilation by Frankie Goes to Hollywood. It was released by ZTT Records in 2000. The compilation contains all of the band's music videos and a series of interviews with band member Paul Rutherford, ZTT co-founders Trevor Horn and Paul Morley, journalist Paul Lester and publicist Gary Farrow. It also includes Morley's history of the band and ZTT, as well as a picture gallery of record sleeves, photographs, press articles and magazine covers.

== Release ==
Hard On was released on DVD in NTSC and PAL. All of the videos were included in their original stereo mixes as well as new 5.1 surround mixes.

In 2009, a new CD compilation was released titled Frankie Say Greatest. A DVD of the same title was released, which featured the same content as Hard On, but with different cover and menu art.

== Track listing ==
Hard On track listing
No.	Title	Video director(s)	Length
1.	"Relax"	Bernard Rose	4:07
2.	"Two Tribes"	Godley & Creme	4:08
3.	"The Power of Love"	Godley & Creme	4:57
4.	"Welcome to the Pleasuredome"	Bernard Rose	7:51
5.	"Rage Hard"	Paul Morley	5:16
6.	"Warriors of the Wasteland"	Nick Burgess-Jones (Note: Credited as Equinox Army.)	3:57
7.	"Watching the Wildlife"	Mike Portelly	3:39
8.	"Relax" (live version)	David Mallet	4:30
9.	"Relax" (laser version)	Godley & Creme	3:53
10.	"Two Tribes '93 (Note: Remixed by Fluke.)"	Godley & Creme	4:16
11.	"The Power of Love" (version 2)	Godley & Creme	4:58
12.	"Welcome to the Pleasuredome '93 (Note: Based on the Altered Real Mix.)"	Bernard Rose	4:55
13.	"The Power of Love 2K (Note: Remixed by Rob Searle.)"	Clive Arrowsmith	4:13
14.	"Two Tribes 2K"	Clive Arrowsmith	4:02

=== Notes ===
Credits are adapted from the DVD booklet.
