= O. Winston Link =

American photographer (1914–2001)

- Born: Ogle Winston Link; December 16, 1914; Brooklyn, New York, U.S.
- Died: January 30, 2001 (aged 86); Katonah, New York, U.S.
- Occupation: Photographer
- Years active: 1937–1983
- Spouses: Vanda Link (m. 1942; div. 1950) Conchita Link (m. 1983; div. 1996)
- Children: Winston Conway Link

Ogle Winston Link (December 16, 1914 – January 30, 2001), known commonly as O. Winston Link, was an American photographer, best known for his black-and-white photography and sound recordings of the last days of steam locomotive railroading on the Norfolk and Western in the United States in the late 1950s. A commercial photographer, Link helped establish rail photography as a hobby. He also pioneered night photography, producing several well-known examples including Hotshot Eastbound, a photograph of a steam train passing a drive-in movie theater, and Hawksbill Creek Swimming Hole showing a train crossing a bridge above children bathing.

== Early life ==
Link and his siblings, Eleanor and Albert Jr., spent their childhood in the borough of Brooklyn, New York City, where they lived with their parents, Albert Link Sr. and Anne Winston Jones Link. Link's given names honor ancestors Alexander Ogle and John Winston Jones, who had served in the U.S. House of Representatives in the 19th century. Al Link, who taught woodworking in the New York City public school system, encouraged his children's interest in arts and crafts and introduced Winston to photography.

Link's early photography was created with a borrowed medium format Autographic Kodak camera. By the time, he was in high school he had built his own photographic enlarger. After completing high school, Link attended the Polytechnic Institute of Brooklyn, receiving a degree in civil engineering. Before his graduation in 1937, he spoke at a banquet for the institute's newspaper, where he served as photo editor. An executive from Carl Byoir's public relations firm was present and was impressed by Link's speaking ability. He offered Link a job as a photographer.

== Commercial photography and military career ==
Hotshot Eastbound, taken at the drive-in theater in Iaeger, West Virginia, was used in Link's book Steam, Steel & Stars. This is one of Link's best-known photographs.

Link worked for Carl Byoir and Associates for five years, learning his trade on the job. He adapted to the technique of making posed photographs looking candid, as well as creatively emphasizing a point. On his first major assignment, he photographed part of Louisiana in the summer of 1937, he found himself in New Iberia, the location where Cecil B. DeMille's 1938 film The Buccaneer was being filmed. There, he met his future first wife, a former Ark-La-Tex, now an actress/model/body double, Vanda Marteal Oglesby, who stood-in for lead actress Franciska Gaal. They "took a shine" to one another, and later that year she posed for some of his photographs at the French Quarter in New Orleans. They eventually married in 1942 but later divorced. Some of Link's photographs from this time included an image of a man aiming a gun at a pig wearing a bulletproof vest, and one eventually known as "What Is This Girl Selling?" or "Girl on Ice", which was widely published in the United States and later featured in Life as a "classic publicity picture." According to Thomas Garver, a later assistant to Link, during his employment at Byoir's firm, Link "clearly defined a point of view and developed working methods that were to shape his entire career."

When World War II reached the United States, Link found himself unable to join the military due to mumps-induced hearing loss. He left Byoir's employ in 1942 to work for the Airborne Instruments Laboratory, which is part of Columbia University. Drawing on his university degree and professional photographic experience, Link worked at the laboratory as both project engineer and photographer. The laboratory was then researching a device to enable aircraft to detect submerged submarines. Link's main responsibility was photographing the project for the United States government.

In 1945, the end of the war, Link's employment at the Airborne Instruments Laboratory ended. Byoir invited Link back, but Link instead opened his own studio in New York City in 1946. His clients included Goodrich, Alcoa, Texaco, and Ethyl. In 1952, he was hired by Haverford College in Pennsylvania to take photos for the college's publicity and admissions materials.

== Rail photography: Norfolk and Western project ==
While in Staunton, Virginia, for an industrial photography job in 1955, Link's longstanding love of railroads became focused on the nearby Norfolk and Western Railway line. N&W was the last major (Class I) railroad to make the transition from steam to diesel motive power and had refined its use of steam locomotives, earning a reputation for "precision transportation". Link took his first night photograph of the road on January 21, 1955, in Waynesboro, Virginia. On May 29, the N&W announced its first conversion to diesel and Link's work became a documentation about the end of the steam era. He returned to Virginia for approximately 20 visits to continue photographing the N&W. His last night shot was taken in 1959 and the last of all in 1960. That year, the road completed the transition to diesel, by which time Link had accumulated 2,400 negatives on the project.

Although it was entirely self-financed, Link's work was encouraged and facilitated by N&W officials, from president Robert H. Smith downwards. Besides the locomotives, he captured the people of the N&W performing their jobs on the railroad and in the trackside communities. Some of his images were of the massive Roanoke Shops, where the company had built and maintained its locomotives.

Link's images were meticulously set up and posed, and he chose to take most of his railroad photographs at night. He said, "I can't move the sun — and it's always in the wrong place — and I can't even move the tracks, so I had to create my own environment through lighting." Although others, including Philip R. Hastings and Jim Shaughnessy, had photographed locomotives at night before, Link's vision required him to develop new techniques for flash photography of such large subjects. For instance, the drive-in image Hotshot Eastbound (Iaeger, West Virginia), photographed on August 2, 1956 [negative NW1103], used 42 #2 flashbulbs and one #0 fired simultaneously. Link, with an assistant such as George Thom, had to lug all his equipment into position and wire it up: this was done in series so any failure would prevent a picture being taken. Taking night shots of moving trains the right position for the subject could only be guessed at. Link used a 4x5 view camera with black and white film, from which he produced silver gelatin prints.

Hawksbill Creek Swimming Hole (Luray, Virginia) was photographed on August 9, 1956 [NW1126]. Other widely known images include Swimming Pool (Welch, West Virginia) (1958 [NW1963]), Ghost Town (Stanley, Virginia) [NW1345], Main Line on Main Street (Northfork, West Virginia) (1958 [NW1966]), and Mr. and Mrs. Ben Pope watches the last steam-powered passenger train (Max Meadows, Virginia) (1957 [NW1648]).

In addition to his black and white night shots, Link also recorded the single daytime train on the Norfolk & Western's hilly Abingdon Branch, serving the rural communities from Abingdon, Virginia, 55 miles (88 km) south to West Jefferson, North Carolina. It was also on this line that most of his railroad color photography was done; a selection is included in The Last Steam Railroad in America. His familiar 1956 view of Maud Bows to the Virginia Creeper (Green Cove, Virginia) exists in black and white and color versions.

In addition to photographing them, Link was also making sound recordings of the trains, which he issued on a set of six gramophone records between 1957 and 1977 under the overall title Sounds of Steam Railroading. In the railfan world, he was probably best known by these, and by photographs published in Trains magazines and elsewhere in the 1950s, which inspired others to follow his example. The recordings he made from 1957 to 1977 were inducted into the National Recording Registry in 2003.

A traveling exhibition in 1983 brought Link's work to a wider public as did Paul Yule's award-winning documentary Trains That Passed in the Night (1990), in which Link re-visited the scenes of his classic photographs of the N&W.

== Later life ==
From 1960 until he retired in 1983, Link devoted himself to advertising. Among notable pictures taken during this period are those recording construction of the Verrazzano–Narrows Bridge and other views of New York Harbor including the great ocean liners. In retirement, Link moved to South Salem and then to Westchester County, New York.

In 1996, Link's second wife, Conchita, was arrested for (and later convicted of) stealing a collection of Link's photographs and attempting to sell them, claiming that Link had Alzheimer's disease and that she had power of attorney. After being released in 2003, she again attempted to sell some of Link's works that she had stolen, this time using the Internet auction site eBay. She received a three-year sentence. Conchita was also accused of imprisoning her husband. However, this allegation is disputed by some, and it never led to any criminal charges against Conchita. The story of Winston and Conchita became the subject of the documentary The Photographer, His Wife, Her Lover (2005) made by Paul Yule. Conchita died on October 1, 2016.

== In popular culture ==
Link made a cameo appearance as a steam locomotive engineer in the 1999 film October Sky, running Southern Railway 4501 (decorated to look like an N&W steam locomotive). He was actively involved with the planning of a museum of his work when he suffered a heart attack near his home in South Salem. He was transported to the Northern Westchester Hospital in Mt. Kisco, New York, where he died on January 30, 2001. Link was interred adjacent to his parents in Elmwood Cemetery, Shepherdstown, Jefferson County, West Virginia.

== Museum and collections ==
The rail photography of Link is featured at the O. Winston Link Museum in Roanoke, which opened in January 2004. The museum is housed in the former passenger station of the Norfolk and Western. Link's N&W caboose forms part of the display.

Haverford College holds a body of Link's photographs in its collections. Its digitized photographic collection includes more than 100 images attributed to Link, largely the campus photographs he made in 1952, while the college's fine arts collection holds a selection of his railroad and other prints donated by his former assistant Thomas Garver, a member of the Haverford class of 1956. After Garver's death, the works were shown in a 2024 memorial exhibition at the college's Jane Lutnick Fine Arts Center.

== See also ==
- Trains in art
- Americana
