= Paul Yule (photojournalist) =

British photojournalist and film director (born 1956)

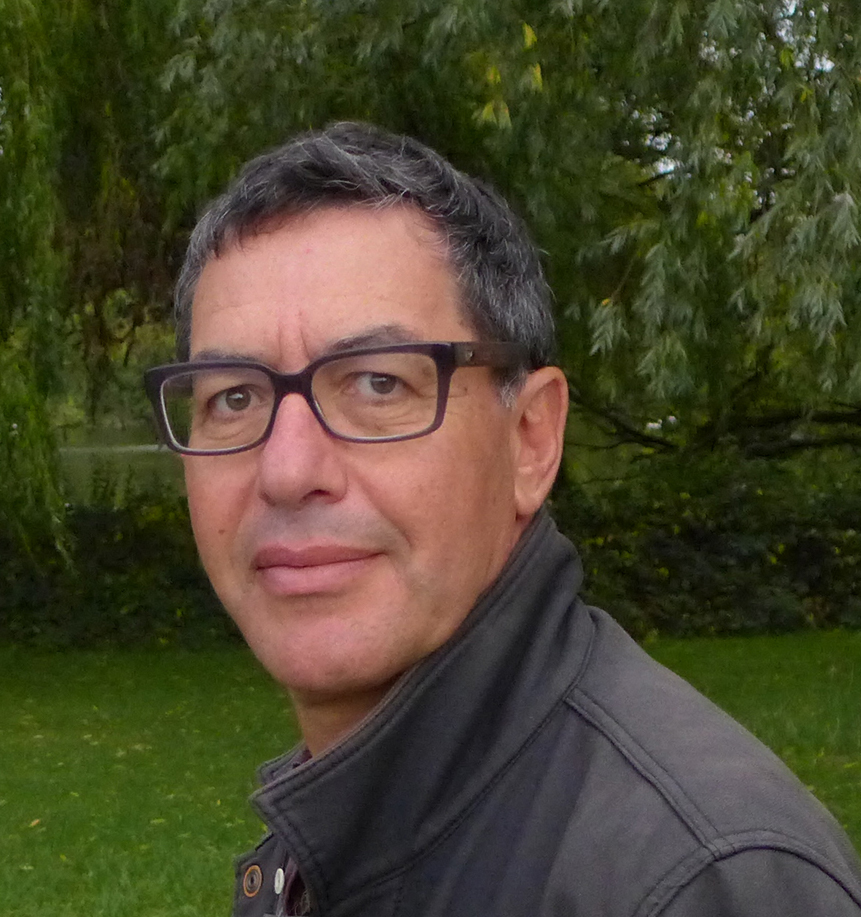
- Born: 1956 (age 69–70); Johannesburg, South Africa
- Education: Oxford University
- Known for: Photojournalist and film director
- Spouse: Denise Dorrance
- Website: www.paulyule.com

Paul Harris Yule (born 1956) is a photojournalist and film maker. In addition to his photography, he has directed more than 30 films on six continents, often on controversial political and social themes, several of which have won major awards, including an International Emmy (for Damned in the USA - Berwick Universal Pictures, 1990), awards from the Royal Television Society, (Note: a) The House of War, Berwick Universal Pictures, 2002 and b) Not Cricket - The Basil D'Oliveira Conspiracy, 2004.) an Edward Morrow Prize, (Note: The House of War, 2002) and an Amnesty International Prize. (Note: Babitsky's War, 2000) He founded the production company Berwick Universal Pictures in London in 1980.

== Early life and education ==
Paul Yule was born in Johannesburg, South Africa and his family emigrated to England when he was eight years old. He went to Aldenham School and then studied Philosophy, Politics and Economics (PPE) at Oxford University.

== Life and work ==
His first outlet for photojournalism was working for the Oxford University magazine Isis, and documenting the early theatre work of contemporaries Rowan Atkinson, Richard Curtis and others of that generation. After leaving Oxford in 1979, Yule went to Peru for eight months working as photographer on The Cusichaca Project near Cusco. In 1980 he founded Berwick Universal Pictures with photographer Chris Plytas, working from a basement studio in Berwick Street, London, and that same year he did the photography and design for Rowan Atkinson's Live in Belfast album. In 1983, following several further visits to Peru, his book The New Incas (with an introduction by John Hemming) was published by The New Pyramid Press and the photographs were exhibited widely, including at Side Gallery in Newcastle, the Royal Geographical Society and The Photographers' Gallery in London.

Photography in Peru became the subject of his first documentary film, Martin Chambi and the Heirs of the Incas (1986), made for the BBC's Arena strand, which depicts the life, times, and contemporary relevance of Martin Chambi, a Cusqueña photographer of the early 20th century. This was the first of half a dozen documentaries Yule made in Peru over the next two decades, and the start of an award-winning collaboration with the producer Andy Harries.

In 1990 Yule made Trains That Passed in the Night, a lyrical film about another great photographer, the American O. Winston Link, whose troubled personal story he was to return to and re-assess 15 years later in The Photographer, His Wife, Her Lover (2005).

In 1991-92 Yule's Channel 4 documentary Damned in the USA, a film about censorship and the arts in the US that features Rev. Donald Wildmon of the American Family Association, became embroiled in a landmark legal dispute. Though the film had already won the International Emmy, Wildmon and the AFA sued Yule, his co-producer Jonathan Stack, and Channel 4 for $8 million in an attempt to stop the distribution of the film, describing it as "blasphemous and obscene". Yule and his co-defendants fought the lawsuit in court in Mississippi and won the legal right to freely exhibit the film. Lou Reed re-wrote the lyrics to his classic "Walk on the Wild Side" in support of the case.

The subject matter of Yule's films has included history, politics, religion, sport, education, and the arts. He has collaborated with several writers, including with Nicholas Shakespeare on films about Mario Vargas Llosa (1990) and Bruce Chatwin (1999); with Peter Oborne on exposés of Robert Mugabe (2003) and the conspiracy surrounding the cricketer Basil D'Oliveira (2004); as well as with Darcus Howe, Miranda Sawyer, Paul Morley and others. He has made two films examining Jewish themes: Good Morning Mr. Hitler! (1993) with Luke Holland, and Battle for the Holocaust (2001). In 2003 he directed an acclaimed drama about Sir Edward Elgar, Elgar's Tenth Muse starring James Fox and written by Nigel Gearing. He has also made a number of films in war zones, often shooting his own material - notably Babitski's War (2000, in Chechnya), The House of War (2002, in Afghanistan), Mugabe's Secret Famine (2003, in Zimbabwe), Here's One We Invaded Earlier (2003, in Afghanistan) and All Out In Pakistan (2017, in Pakistan). Producers with whom he has collaborated include Jonathan Stack, George Carey, Roy Ackerman, Samir Shah and Markus Davies.

In 2008 Yule completed a three-film 60-year history of apartheid in South Africa and its consequences (White Lies, 1994 - about the International Defence and Aid Fund; The Basil D'Oliveira Conspiracy, 2004; and The Captain and the Bookmaker, 2008– the latter two of which focus on the political history of South Africa as seen through the prism of cricket, including the downfall of Hansie Cronje).

In 2011 he was invited to teach filmmaking at The University of Cape Town. While there he originated "The Big Picture", an intensive, hands-on documentary film production course aimed at training a new generation of filmmakers and technicians to make fresh, socially relevant, local programming. In conjunction with this he was centrally involved in the re-launch of Cape Town's community television station, CTV. In 2013 and 2015 he directed and was show-runner on two seasons of Dream School SA, a reality series about education in South Africa. (Note: Broadcast on M-Net and SABC2)

Recent films include The Life of Jo Menell (2019), a film about the iconoclastic activist filmmaker, which received its World Premiere at The Encounters Documentary Film Festival as well as All Out In Pakistan (BBC, 2017) and Cricket in Beirut (2026) - structured around Peter Oborne's cricket tours, the latter two look at the relationship of cricket to politics in Pakistan and Lebanon.

In 2021 a retrospective book of his photography, "My Developing Eye", was published.

== Personal life ==
Yule is married to the cartoonist Denise Dorrance and has four children.

== Filmography ==
- Martin Chambi and the Heirs of the Incas (1986)
- Our God the Condor (1987)
- Iquitos (1988)
- Mario Vargas Llosa: The Story of the Novelist Who Would Be President (1990)
- O Winston Link: Trains that Passed in the Night (1990)
- Damned in the USA (1991)
- As American as Apple Pie (1992)
- Good Morning Mr Hitler! (1993)
- White Lies (1994)
- Return to the Sacred Ice (1994)
- Geiger Sweet Geiger Sour (1995)
- Elgar's Tenth Muse (1996)
- Lone Star Hate (1997)
- In the Footsteps of Bruce Chatwin (1999)
- Welcome to Armageddon (1999)
- Babitsky's War (2000)
- Battle for the Holocaust (2001)
- Marquis de Sade: Pornographer or Prophet? (2001)
- The House of War (2002)
- Mugabe's Secret Famine (2003)
- Afghanistan – Here's One We Invaded Earlier (2003)
- Not Cricket: The Basil D'Oliveira Conspiracy (2004)
- The Last Waterloo Cup (2005)
- The Photographer, His Wife, Her Lover (2005)
- Is This My Country? (2006)
- A Matter of Life and Death (2007)
- Not Cricket 2: The Captain and The Bookmaker (2008)
- Black Star – An African Football Odyssey (2008)
- How To Be A Composer (2009)
- God do not Live Here Anymore? (2010)
- Derek Parker - A Life in Architecture (2011)
- Dream School SA – Season 1 (2013)
- Spring Queen (2014)
- Dream School SA – Season 2 (2015)
- All Out in Pakistan (2017)
- The Life of Jo Menell - Americans, Mongrels & Funky Junkies (2019)
- Cricket in Beirut (2026)
