= How to Be a Composer =

- How to Be a Composer title card
- Genre: Music
- Directed by: Paul Yule
- Starring: Paul Morley
- Narrated by: Poppy Edwards
- Country of origin: United Kingdom
- Original language: English
- No. of series: 1
- No. of episodes: 2

Production
- Executive producers: Adam Barker; Roy Ackerman
- Producer: Paul Yule
- Production location: London
- Editor: John Street
- Running time: 60 minutes
- Production company: Diverse Production (Zodiak Entertainment)

Original release
- Network: BBC Four
- Release: 18 July – 19 July 2009

How to Be a Composer is a British television documentary in two episodes, first shown on BBC Four in July 2009.

== Background ==
Produced and directed by Paul Yule, the show was based around the former New Musical Express journalist Paul Morley learning how to create a piece of classical music.

The films observe Morley spending a year at the prestigious Royal Academy of Music in London. Morley begins without knowing musical notation or music theory. By the end of the year, with the help of his tutor Christopher Austin and the students at the academy, we see the performance of his string quartet.
