= The Club Mixes 2000 =

Remix album by Frankie Goes to Hollywood
- Released: 14 November 2000 (Germany)
- Genre: New wave; dance
- Label: Repertoire – REP 4913
- Producer: Trevor Horn; Stephen Lipson

Frankie Goes to Hollywood chronology
Maximum Joy (2000)	The Club Mixes 2000 (2000)	Twelve Inches (2001)

Professional ratings
Review scores
Source	Rating
AllMusic	3/5 stars

The Club Mixes 2000 is a remix album by Frankie Goes to Hollywood. It was released in 2000 by Repertoire Records of Germany.

The album's track listing is made up almost exclusively of new remixes commissioned by ZTT in 2000 for the Maximum Joy hits compilation campaign.

== Track listing ==
Disc one

1. "Relax" (Club 69 Future Anthem Part I) – 11:27
2. "Welcome to the Pleasuredome" (Nalin & Kane Dub) – 11:18
3. "The Power of Love" (Rob Searle Club Mix) – 8:41
4. "Two Tribes" (Apollo Four Forty Remix) – 6:10
5. "Warriors of the Wasteland" (Paralyzer's Warriormix) – 5:20
6. "Welcome to the Pleasuredome" (Stripped Down Mix by Thomas Schumacher) – 7:07
7. "Relax" (Marc et Claude's Respect Remix) – 7:54
8. "Two Tribes" (Olav Basoski Tiberium Power Mix) – 9:45
9. "Rage Hard" (Kay Cee Remix) – 7:44

Disc two

1. "Welcome to the Pleasuredome" (Paralyzer's Pleasuremix) – 7:07
2. "Two Tribes" (Rob Searle Club Dub) – 8:29
3. "Maximum Joy" (DJ Rene Club Mix) – 9:50
4. "Welcome to the Pleasuredome" (Sander's Coming Home Remix) – 10:18
5. "Two Tribes" (Fluke Magimix) – 5:26
6. "Welcome to the Pleasuredome" (Sleaze Sisters' Remix) – 7:37
7. "The Power of Love" (Minky's Yaba Mix) – 8:13
