= Kay Plunkett-Hogge =

Kay Plunkett-Hogge is a British and Thai food writer and cookbook author. Plunkett-Hogge is a contributor to The Guardian and The Daily Telegraph.

== Early life and education ==
Plunkett-Hogge was born and raised in Bangkok, Thailand, to an Irish mother and British father. Her father worked for Ford Motors, and was transferred to work in Thailand in 1961 to sell tractors. She attended boarding school in the United Kingdom.

== Career ==
In 2019, Plunkett-Hogge published Baan: Recipes and Stories from My Thai Home. She relocated back to Thailand in January 2020.

== Books ==
- A Sherry & A Little Plate of Tapas (2016)
- Adventures of a Terribly Greedy Girl (2017)
- Baan: Recipes and Stories from My Thai Home (2019)
- Manners: A Modern Field Guide (2021)
- Siam: A Thai Cookbook (2026)
