= Sexmix =

Remix album by Frankie Goes to Hollywood
- Released: 3 August 2012
- Genre: New wave; dance
- Label: ZTT; Salvo; Union Square Music
- Producer: Trevor Horn; Stephen Lipson

Frankie Goes to Hollywood chronology
Frankie Say Greatest (2009)	Sexmix (2012)	Frankie Said (2012)

Sexmix (subtitled Archive Tapes and Studio Adventures, Volume One) is a Frankie Goes to Hollywood remix album released on 3 August 2012. The set focuses on rare FGTH single formats, specifically the cassette releases ("singlettes") and CD releases.

== Controversy ==
A day before the set was revealed, it was revealed that mono mixes had been supplied for the "All in the Body, All in the Mind" singlette, with hints of a lossless replacement download for said single. Many people didn't take notice until the set was released, when a majority of people gave the release low ratings due to this.

Eventually, on 21 November 2012, ZTT offered a mail-order physical replacement disc (with said tracks mastered in stereo) to those who had purchased the set prior, by either sending them the mono disc or emailing (or sending) a scanned copy of their receipt or other proof of purchase (to prove they have bought the compilation) to Union Square Music's email address.

== Track listing ==
=== Disc 1 ===
1. "all in the body" – 1:23
2. "The Soundtrack from Bernard Rose's Video of the Welcome to the Pleasuredome Single" - 5:43
3. "Get It On" – 4:11
4. "Welcome to the Pleasuredome (How to Remake the World)" – 11:40
5. "all in the mind" – 1:13
6. "Relax (International)" – 4:44
7. "The Power of Love (extended, singlette version)" – 9:20
8. "scrapped" – 1:39
9. "Holier Than Thou" – 1:08
10. "trapped" – 2:29
11. "Holier Than Thou" – 4:09
12. "The Power of Love (instrumental, singlette version)" – 3:32
13. "The World is My Oyster (in its 7" form)" – 4:18
14. "don't lose what's left" – 0:19
15. "Rage Hard ⊕⊕⊕✪" – 17:13
- Tracks 1–5 form the original "All in the Body, All in the Mind" singlette. Tracks 1 and 5 are excerpts from Walter Kaufmann's 1967 translation of Friedrich Nietzsche's The Birth of Tragedy as read by Geoffrey Palmer, track 2 is the soundtrack to the shorter "Escape Act" version of the original promo clip (the full "Alternative to Reality" version clocks in at 7:52), track 3 is the full version of their cover of T-Rex's "Get It On" (which had been featured in shorter edits on the vinyl release) and track 4 is a unique extended version of "Real Altered".
- Tracks 7–12 form the original cassette release of the first "Power of Love" 12". Differences include Track 7 opening with an excerpt of T. S. Eliot's Four Quartets, tracks 9 and 11 having the usage of "fuck" and "shit" reversed and track 12 ending with two short unlisted tracks, which are merged into that track.
- Tracks 6 and 13 are the original B-sides to the afromented singles. "Relax (International)" was the live B-side of the "Real Altered" 12" and "The World Is My Oyster (in its 7" form)" was the B-side to the "Power of Love" 7".
- Track 14 is an excerpt of "Don't Lose What's Left (Of Your Little Mind)" which predicted "Roadhouse Blues" on the rare "Rage Hard" CD single.
- Track 15 was originally released on the rare CD single release of "Rage Hard".

=== Disc 2 ===
1. "Relax (Sex mix)" – 16:26
2. "Later On (from One September Monday)" – 1:36
3. "Ferry Cross the Mersey (...And Here I'll Stay) – 4:07
4. "Two Tribes (Keep the Peace, intro)" – 0:24
5. "One February Friday (singlette version, part 1)" – 0:40
6. "Two Tribes (Carnage)" – 7:55
7. "One February Friday (singlette version, part 2)" – 1:08
8. "War (somewhere between Hiding and Hidden)" – 4:14
9. "One February Friday (singlette Version, part 3)" – 0:22
10. "Two Tribes (Keep the Peace, outro)" – 0:06
11. "Warriors of the Wasteland (Compacted)" – 23:39
  1. "The Diamond Mine" – 2:24
  2. "Warriors (Twelve Wild Disciples mix)" – 9:44
  3. "Warriors (Of the Wasteland) (instrumental, fewer vocals)" – 5:01
  4. "Warriors of the Wasteland (7" version)" – 3:55
  5. "Monopoly Re-Solution" – 2:25
12. "Do You Think I'm Sexy?" – 4:20
13. "Watching the Wildlife (Voiceless)" – 3:51
- Track 1 is the first 12" mix of "Relax", infamous for its length, the slightly offensive lines present through Holly Johnson's rambling and not including the regular song.
- Tracks 2, 5, 7 and 9 are interview excerpts that were only released on singlettes. Tracks 4 and 10 are spoken-dialogue tracks bridging the start and end "Two Tribes" singlette.
- Track 6 is the second 12" mix of "Two Tribes".
- Tracks 3 and 8 are the regular 12" cover B-sides to "Relax" and "Two Tribes" respectively.
- Track 11 was originally released as a single-track CD single in 1986. Track 11.3 is a mix of the album version without vocals except in the chorus at the end.
- Track 12 is a cover of Rod Stewart's "Da Ya Think I'm Sexy?", first released in 2009 on the now-discontinued digital version of Frankie Say Greatest. It was intended to be one of the planned "Warriors" B-sides, according to several sources.
- Track 13 was originally released as one of the B-sides to "Watching the Wildlife", except unlike previous releases it is not combined with bits 1 and 2.
