= Bang!... The Greatest Hits of Frankie Goes to Hollywood =

Greatest hits album by Frankie Goes to Hollywood
- Released: 18 October 1993
- Genre: Pop; rock
- Length: 59:42
- Label: ZTT/Island
- Producer: Trevor Horn; Stephen Lipson

Frankie Goes to Hollywood chronology
Liverpool (1986)	Bang!... The Greatest Hits of Frankie Goes to Hollywood (1993)	Reload! Frankie: The Whole 12 Inches (1994)

Singles from Bang!... The Greatest Hits of Frankie Goes to Hollywood
- 1. "Relax" Released: 20 September 1993; 2. "Welcome to the Pleasuredome" Released: 8 November 1993; 3. "The Power of Love" Released: 6 December 1993; 4. "Two Tribes (Fluke's Minimix)" Released: 14 February 1994

Professional ratings
Review scores
Source	Rating
AllMusic	link
NME	7/10

Bang!... The Greatest Hits of Frankie Goes to Hollywood is a compilation album by Frankie Goes to Hollywood, released in 1993 during a spate of reissuing and remixing of Frankie Goes to Hollywood products by ZTT Records, hence the appearance of "classic" 1993 versions of two tracks, and the addition of one contemporary remix on the American CD version of 1994.

== Track listing ==
=== CD: Warner / 4509-93912-2 United Kingdom ===
1. "Relax" – 3:55 from Welcome to the Pleasuredome, classic 1993 version
2. "Two Tribes" – 3:56 from Welcome to the Pleasuredome, single version
3. "War (Hide Yourself!)" – 4:14 original B-side version
4. "Ferry Cross the Mersey" – 4:03 original B-side version
5. "Warriors of the Wasteland" – 3:55 from Liverpool, single remix
6. "For Heaven's Sake" – 4:27 from Liverpool
7. "The World Is My Oyster" – 1:57 from Welcome to the Pleasuredome
8. "Welcome to the Pleasuredome" – 13:39 from Welcome to the Pleasuredome
9. "Watching the Wildlife" – 3:58 from Liverpool, classic 1993 version
10. "Born to Run" – 4:05 from Welcome to the Pleasuredome
11. "Rage Hard" – 5:04 from Liverpool, single version
12. "The Power of Love" – 5:28 from Welcome to the Pleasuredome
13. "Bang" – 1:08 from Welcome to the Pleasuredome

=== CD: Atlantic / 82587-2 United States ===
1. "Relax" – 3:55
2. "Two Tribes" – 3:54
3. "War" – 4:14
4. "Ferry Cross the Mersey" – 4:03
5. "Warriors of the Wasteland" – 3:55
6. "For Heaven's Sake" – 4:27
7. "The World Is My Oyster" – 1:57
8. "Welcome to the Pleasuredome" – 13:39
9. "Watching the Wildlife" – 3:58
10. "Born to Run" – 4:05
11. "Rage Hard" – 5:04
12. "The Power of Love" – 5:28
13. "Bang" – 1:08
14. "Relax" (New York Mix) – 7:27
15. "Two Tribes" (Teckno Prisoner Mix featuring Adamski) – 6:21

== Charts ==
=== Weekly charts ===
Weekly chart performance for Bang!... The Greatest Hits of Frankie Goes to Hollywood
Chart (1993–1994)	Peak position
Australian Albums (ARIA)	5
Austrian Albums (Ö3 Austria)	15
Dutch Albums (Album Top 100)	20
European Albums (Music & Media)	12
Finnish Albums (Suomen virallinen lista)	10
German Albums (Offizielle Top 100)	8
New Zealand Albums (RMNZ)	38
Swedish Albums (Sverigetopplistan)	21
Swiss Albums (Schweizer Hitparade)	11
UK Albums (OCC)	4

=== Year-end charts ===
1993 year-end chart performance for Bang!... The Greatest Hits of Frankie Goes to Hollywood
Chart (1993)	Position
UK Albums (OCC)	55

1994 year-end chart performance for Bang!... The Greatest Hits of Frankie Goes to Hollywood
Chart (1994)	Position
German Albums (Offizielle Top 100)	92

== Certifications ==
Certifications for Bang!... The Greatest Hits of Frankie Goes to Hollywood
Region	Certification	Certified units/sales
France (SNEP)	Platinum	300,000^{*}
Germany (BVMI)	Gold	250,000^{^}
United Kingdom (BPI)	Gold	100,000^{^}
^{*} Sales figures based on certification alone.^{^} Shipments figures based on certification alone.
