= Reload! Frankie: The Whole 12 Inches =

Remix album by Frankie Goes to Hollywood
- Released: 9 May 1994
- Genre: Pop; rock; dance
- Label: ZTT – 4509-95292-2
- Producer: Trevor Horn; Stephen Lipson

Frankie Goes to Hollywood chronology
Bang!... The Greatest Hits of Frankie Goes to Hollywood (1993)	Reload! Frankie: The Whole 12 Inches (1994)	Maximum Joy (2000)

Reload! Frankie: The Whole 12 Inches is a remix album by Frankie Goes to Hollywood. It was released by ZTT Records in 1994 as a complementary album to Bang!... The Greatest Hits of Frankie Goes to Hollywood.

Reload! contains classic and new mixes of five Frankie Goes to Hollywood singles. Many of these mixes were also released on the Twelve Inches collection.

== Track listing ==
1. "Relax" (New York mix) – 7:24
2. "Relax" (Ollie J mix) – 6:27
3. "Relax" (Jam & Spoon Trip-O-Matic Fairy Tale mix) – 7:49
4. "Two Tribes" (Carnage mix) – 7:56
5. "Two Tribes" (Intermission Legend mix) – 5:15
6. "Welcome to the Pleasuredome" (Pleasurefix mix) – 9:40
7. "Welcome to the Pleasuredome" (Brothers in Rhythm Rollercoaster mix) – 14:37
8. "Rage Hard" (Young Person's Guide to the 12 Inch mix) – 10:04
9. "Warriors of the Wasteland" (Twelve Wild Disciples mix) – 9:43

== Mix descriptions ==
- "Relax" (New York mix) is the third 12" mix, which was originally released as the "Sex Mix" (as, confusingly, were the first two). It features four minutes of instrumental loops and textures before cutting to the standard vocal mix.
- The Ollie J and Jam & Spoon mixes were first released on the 1993 reissue of "Relax". The latter mix features vocal samples from "Relax", and an interpretation of the "Two Tribes" riff.
- "Two Tribes" (Carnage mix) is mostly instrumental, with "my name's Nash, mine is the last voice you will ever hear" over a stripped-down version of the last chorus, then looping round for a vocal run through the track, with an extended middle eight.
- The Legend mix appeared on a German 12" single in 1993, featuring four Intermission remixes, using vocal samples from the original track.
- "Welcome to the Pleasuredome" (Pleasurefix mix) is actually the original 12" mix (also known as the Real Altered or Alternative to Reality mix) and is an instrumental run through followed by a vocal run through. It is not the same as the Pleasure Fix mix that appeared on the B-side of "The Power of Love" 12" single.
- The Brothers in Rhythm mix, one of the 1993 remixes, follows a similar pattern to the album version, but with completely retooled backing.
- "Rage Hard" (Young Person's Guide to the 12 Inch mix) is 10:04 on this compilation, compared with over 12 minutes on the 12" releases. It fades out in the second verse of the main song.
- "Warriors of the Wasteland" (Twelve Wild Disciples mix) is a sampled and reconstructed version of the song according to the info on the sleeve of the 12" mix. The format is an instrumental run through, break to 4 loops of the middle 8 with extra keyboards, then a vocal run through.
