= And Then There Was One (2016 film) =

2016 film

- Directed by: Evan Lofback
- Written by: Evan Lofback
- Produced by: Chuck Chambliss
- Narrated by: Danny Harmon
- Edited by: Chuck Chambliss
- Production company: S-Line Productions
- Distributed by: Tennessee Valley Railroad Museum
- Release date: September 9, 2016
- Running time: 93 minutes
- Country: United States
- Language: English

And Then There Was One is a 2016 documentary film focusing on the history of Southern Railway 4501. It was directed by Evan Lofback. The film premiered at the Tennessee Valley Railroad Museum on September 9, 2016.

== Background ==
The film was conceived by amateur videographer Evan Lofback in April 2014 as part of a Facebook campaign to create an "open source" documentary using material provided by fans of the locomotive. The project gained traction in the railfan community shortly afterwards and soon had the support of several notable individuals and organizations, including the Tennessee Valley Railroad Museum, Norfolk Southern Railway, and the Southern Railway Historical Association.

The small production team was composed entirely of volunteers, which contributed to an abnormally long production time. Interviews had to be arranged, and material had to be collected gradually as volunteers had the time to do so. Alternatively, the use of volunteers resulted in limited to no production costs (as there was no budget).

After 18 months of production, the film premiered as part of the Tennessee Valley Railroad Museum's annual Railfest event on September 9, 2016. The filmmakers had guaranteed that the completed documentary would be released free to the public as part of the "open source" nature of the project. Following the premiere on September 9, the documentary was made available free to the public on YouTube at midnight on September 10, 2016.

== Release ==
The film was released on DVD in America on December 13, 2016, via the Tennessee Valley Railroad Museum (both online and in their gift shop). The release features a two-disc set containing the entire documentary and over 80 minutes of bonus features.

== Plot ==
The film follows the history of Southern Railway 4501 from its construction in 1911 all the way up to its restoration and operation in 2014. The locomotive served the Southern Railway and the Kentucky & Tennessee Railway before being purchased by a small group of railroad enthusiasts in Chattanooga, Tennessee in 1964. Following its relocation to Chattanooga, the engine was restored by the newly formed Tennessee Valley Railroad Museum and returned to service in 1966. Through the support of the Southern Railway (and later Norfolk Southern), the locomotive began operating excursions over the railroad's main lines until 1994, when the excursion program ended. The locomotive was removed from service in 1998.

With the introduction of Norfolk Southern Railway's 21st Century Steam program in 2011, the 4501 underwent an extensive restoration in an effort to return it to service. Test runs were performed in September 2014, and the locomotive returned to the main line in May 2015. Unfortunately, the excursion program was again ended by Norfolk Southern in early 2016 after just one season of mainline operation for the 4501. The locomotive continues to operate semi-regularly at the Tennessee Valley Railroad Museum.

The film focuses on several different aspects of the locomotive's history, most notably the relationships that different people had with the engine and with each other.

== Interviews ==
A total of eight interviews were conducted with different railroad employees, volunteers, and historians. They include (in order of appearance):

- Shane Meador - Restoration Project Manager
- Steve Freer - Operations Coordinator, TVRM
- George Walker - General Manager, TVRM
- Robert Soule III - Son of Bob Soule, Jr. (early TVRM member who was integral to the plot)
- Jason Sobczynski - Lead Restoration Project Contractor
- Grady Ragan - Early TVRM Member (contemporary of Paul Merriman and Bob Soule, Jr.)
- Tim Andrews - President, TVRM
- Donald Purdie - Son of Bill Purdie (Southern Railway employee who was integral to the plot)

== Reception ==
Trains' Jim Wrinn gave the documentary a positive review, noting that it "sparkles with its depth and appreciation for the subject." He also said that the film would be a landmark in the history of American railway preservation.

Norfolk Southern, Tennessee Valley Railroad Museum, and others also provided positive reviews and helped share the free video on social media, where it quickly became popular amongst the railfan community.
