= Frankie Say Greatest =

Greatest hits album by Frankie Goes to Hollywood
- Released: 2 November 2009
- Genre: Pop; rock; dance
- Label: ZTT; Universal; All Around the World
- Producer: Trevor Horn; Stephen Lipson; Chicane; Kenny Hayes; Scott Storch; Freddy Bastone

Frankie Goes to Hollywood chronology
Rage Hard: The Sonic Collection (2001)	Frankie Say Greatest (2009)	Sexmix (2012)

Professional ratings
Review scores
Source	Rating
NU.nl	link

Frankie Say Greatest is a compilation album by Frankie Goes to Hollywood, released in 2009 by ZTT Records. The album is available in various formats: single CD, double CD, double LP, and DVD. The latter contains the music videos to the band's singles, while the LP version focusses on remixes only.

== Track listing ==
=== CD: Universal Music TV/All Around the World/ZTT / 2723027 / 2724183 UK ===
1. "Relax" (Original 7") – 3:54
2. "Two Tribes" – 3:23
3. "Welcome to the Pleasuredome" (Escape Act Video Mix) – 5:11
4. "War" – 4:14
5. "The Power of Love" – 5:28
6. "Ferry Cross the Mersey" – 4:03
7. "Is Anybody Out There?" (Movement 2) – 7:33
8. "(Tag)" – 0:34
9. "Born to Run" – 3:56
10. "Warriors of the Wasteland" – 4:53
11. "Rage Hard" – 5:09
12. "Watching the Wildlife" – 4:19
13. "Happy Hi!" – 4:04
14. "The Waves" – 2:44
15. "Relax" (Chicane Radio Edit) – 3:12
16. "Two Tribes" (Hibakusha) – 6:36
17. "Relax" (Lockout's Radio Edit) – 3:30

Note:

- Track 1 is labelled as "Relax" – Original 7". The original title for this version is also known as "Move" and "Suck It".
- Tracks 2, 5 and 9–13 are the original album versions.
- Track 3 is also known as "Welcome to the Pleasuredome" (Alternative Reel) or "Welcome to the Pleasuredome" (A Remade World).
- Track 4 is the "Hide Yourself" version.
- Track 6 for instance can be found on the "Relax" 12", Frankie Said, Sexmix and Bang!... The Greatest Hits of Frankie Goes to Hollywood.
- Track 7 is an alternative mix from the original song, and is exclusive to this release. Also, the title is misspelled "Is There Anybody Out There?".
- Track 8 "(Tag)" was an unlisted orchestral extract from "Two Tribes" and featured an impersonation of Prince Charles (by Chris Barrie) ruminating about orgasms.
- Track 14 has an early fade-out compared to the original version, said edit also appears on the 2009 Japanese Return to the Pleasuredome box set and the 2011 deluxe edition of Liverpool. According to Mark Ward, he had been trying to make it sound decent enough to get onto said Japanese set (due to the master tapes not being accessible to them), and hadn't realised that he was using the "wrong" version.
- Track 15 and 17 are new remixes, exclusive to this release. Extended versions appear on promos under the names "Chicane Full Mix" (10:01) and "Lockout's London Mix" (6:16).
- Track 16 appears on the "Two Tribes" 12" (Hibakusha), Bang! (Japanese release) and Twelve Inches (disc 2).
- The digital release adds "San Jose" after "Born to Run".

=== CD 2: Universal Music TV/All Around the World/ZTT / 2724180 / 2724184 UK ===
1. "Relax" (Sex Mix) – 16:22
2. "Two Tribes" (Annihilation) – 9:09
3. "War" (Hidden) – 8:33
4. "Welcome to the Pleasuredome" (Fruitness Mix) – 12:12
5. "Rage Hard" (Freddie Bastone Remix) – 6:59
6. "Watching the Wildlife" (Hotter) – 9:07
7. "Relax" (Scott Storch Mix) – 3:40
8. "Suffragette City" – 3:34
9. "Our Silver Turns to Gold" – 3:39
10. "Get It On" – 2:33

Note:

- Track 4 is the extended version from the second 12" single.
- Track 5 is taken from the USA 12" single. Also, the name of the remixer is misspelled, it should be Freddy Bastone.
- Track 7 is a new remix, exclusive to this release.
- Track 9 is an unreleased track, first released a few months earlier in the Japanese set Return to the Pleasuredome. In addition, the digital release also includes two unreleased covers, "Do You Think I'm Sexy?" and "Every Kinda People".
- Track 10 is a short version that appeared on the 12" releases. Various versions were issued, all varying in length.

=== Vinyl: Universal Music TV/All Around the World/ZTT / 2724443 UK ===
1. "Relax" (Den Broeder, Cox, Cantrelle Club Mix) – 7:42
2. "Two Tribes" (Surrender) – 3:46
3. "Welcome to the Pleasuredome" (Brothers in Rhythm Rollercoaster Mix) – 14:38
4. "Relax" (Spencer & Hill Remix) – 5:40
5. "Warriors of the Wasteland" (Attack Mix feat. Gary Moore) – 6:32
6. "The Power of Love" ('93 Alternative Mix) – 5:08
7. "Two Tribes" (Intermission Legend Mix) – 5:15
8. "Relax" (Club 69 Future Anthem Part 1) – 11:29
9. "Rage Hard" (Board) – 8:40
10. "Maximum Joy" (DJ Rene Club Mix) – 9:45
11. "Welcome to the Pleasuredome" (Fruitness Mix) – 12:12
12. "Watching The Wildlife" (Die Letzten Tage Der Menschheit) – 10:15
