= Maximum Joy (album) =

Greatest hits album by Frankie Goes to Hollywood
- Released: 25 October 2000
- Recorded: 1983–1986
- Genres: New wave; EDM
- Length: 72:00 (CD 1); 60:00 (CD 2)
- Label: ZTT – ZTT 165 CD
- Producers: Trevor Horn; Stephen Lipson

Frankie Goes to Hollywood chronology
Reload! Frankie: The Whole 12 Inches (1994)	Maximum Joy (2000)	The Club Mixes 2000 (2000)

Singles from Maximum Joy
- 1. "The Power of Love" Released: 12 June 2000; 2. "Two Tribes" Released: August 2000; 3. "Welcome to the Pleasuredome" Released: November 2000; 4. "Relax" Released: 2001 (US, Spain and Hong Kong only)

Professional ratings
Review scores
Source	Rating
AllMusic	3/5 stars

Maximum Joy is a greatest hits album by Frankie Goes to Hollywood, released on 25 October 2000 by ZTT Records.

== Background ==
The album takes its name from a song title from the band's Liverpool album.

The track listing is a mixture of singles and album tracks. The band's seven singles are accounted for here, in their album versions. Also featured are the four cover versions the band committed to album.

Rounding out the collection is a bonus CD of newly commissioned remixes by people like Rob Searle and Peter Rauhofer.

To celebrate the release of Maximum Joy, ZTT re-issued four of the Welcome to the Pleasuredome–era singles complete with more of the 2000 remixes.

Repertoire Records from Germany collected two discs worth of these mixes and issued them as The Club Mixes 2000.

Design and art direction were by Simon Griffin & Ed Sullivan at Dolphin Studio.

== Track listing ==
CD One

1. "Relax" – 3:57
2. "Two Tribes" – 3:22
3. "Ferry Cross the Mersey" – 4:03
4. "The World Is My Oyster" – 1:58
5. "Welcome to the Pleasuredome" – 13:39
6. "Maximum Joy" – 5:30
7. "San Jose" – 3:09
8. "Warriors of the Wasteland" – 5:00
9. "Rage Hard" – 5:02
10. "War" – 6:12
11. "Watching the Wildlife" – 4:17
12. "Born to Run" – 4:05
13. "The Power of Love" – 5:30

CD Two

1. "The Power of Love" (Rob Searle Club Mix) – 8:38
2. "Relax" (Club 69 Future Anthem Part 1) – 11:27
3. "Welcome to the Pleasuredome" (Nalin & Kane Remix) – 11:23
4. "Maximum Joy" (DJ Rene Club Mix) – 9:45
5. "Two Tribes" (Rob Searle Club Mix) – 9:18
6. "Welcome to the Pleasuredome" (Sander's Coming Home Mix) – 10:18
7. "Two Tribes" (Apollo Four Forty Remix) – 6:10
