= Paul Morley =

British music journalist (born 1957)

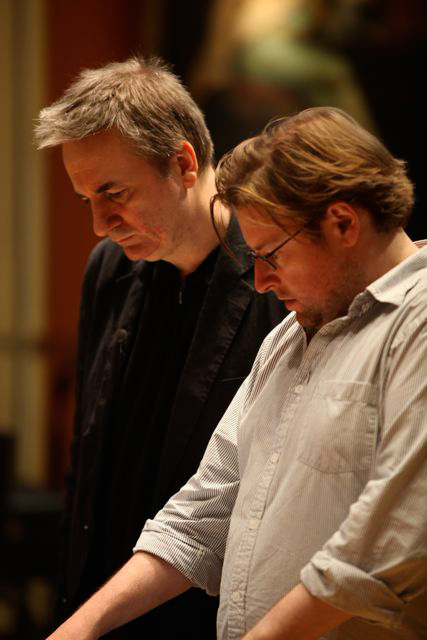
- Morley (left) with Chris Austin

Background information
- Born: Paul Robert Morley; 26 March 1957 (age 69); Farnham, Surrey, England
- Origin: Stockport, England
- Occupations: Journalist; writer; record producer; television presenter
- Formerly of: Art of Noise; Infantjoy

Paul Robert Morley (born 26 March 1957) is an English music journalist. He wrote for the NME from 1977 to 1983, and has since written for a wide range of publications and written his own books. He was a co-founder of the record label ZTT Records and was a member of the synth-pop group Art of Noise. He has also been a band manager, promoter, and television presenter.

== Early life ==
Paul Robert Morley was born on 26 March 1957 in Farnham, Surrey, and moved with his family to Reddish, Lancashire, before starting school. He was educated at Stockport Grammar School, at the time a direct grant grammar school. In his later teenage years, he would travel to London "in search of music, and new experience".

== Career ==
Morley wrote for three Manchester area magazines in the late 1970s, Penetration, Out There, and Girl Trouble. He then went on to write for NME, where he and colleagues such as Ian Penman developed an innovative style of music criticism that drew on critical theory and other non-musical sources. Whilst working at NME, he lived in North London in between Swiss Cottage and Finchley Road. After leaving the NME, he was a regular contributor to Blitz magazine from 1984 to 1987, penning a monthly television column as well as a series of interviews.

For a time, Morley produced and managed Manchester punk band the Drones. However, he first came to wider attention with a brief appearance in the video for ABC's "The Look of Love" (in which he mimes the words "what's that?" in a call-and-response routine with singer Martin Fry), and some fame as co-founder, with Trevor Horn, of ZTT Records and electronic group Art of Noise.

Morley is credited with steering the marketing and promotion of the phenomenal early success of ZTT's biggest act, Frankie Goes to Hollywood, heavily influenced by Deutsch Amerikanische Freundschaft's image for Alles ist gut. Although it has never been confirmed, it is claimed that Morley authored the provocative slogans on the band's T-shirts (e.g. "Frankie Say Arm the Unemployed", "Frankie Say War! Hide Yourself").

He was the first presenter of BBC Two's The Late Show, and has appeared as a music pundit on a number of other programmes. For the short-lived Channel 4 arts strand Without Walls he wrote and presented a documentary on boredom. Morley regularly appeared on BBC's The Review Show.

He was the focus of BBC Two's How to Be a Composer, in which he spent a year at the Royal Academy of Music attempting to learn to compose classical music, despite being unable to read music or play an instrument.

Morley is the author of Words and Music: A History of Pop in the Shape of a City. The book is a journey through the history of pop; it seeks to trace the connection between Alvin Lucier's experimental audio recording, "I Am Sitting in a Room" and Kylie Minogue's "Can't Get You Out of My Head". A synthetic Kylie features as the central character of the book. The book was later turned into the hour-long epic musical track "Raiding the 20th Century" by DJ Food, which features Morley reading from his book and speculating on the cultural significance of the mashup, amidst the sounds of those very mashups.

His other books include Ask: The Chatter of Pop (a collection of his music journalism) and Nothing, concerning his father's suicide and that of Joy Division singer Ian Curtis and such unhappy experiences as the time Morley spent at Stockport Grammar School.

Morley teamed up with the Auteurs' James Banbury to form the band Infantjoy and in 2005 released an album entitled Where the Night Goes on Sony BMG. With, an album featuring collaborations with Tunng, Isan and other musicians, was released in October 2006 on Morley and Banbury's own label ServiceAV.

Morley is a fan of the jazz musician John Surman and conducted an interview with the artist for The Guardian newspaper.

== Personal life ==
Morley was married to Claudia Brücken with whom he has a son and a daughter.

He is the brother of filmmaker Carol Morley.

== Cultural references ==
The Cure played a version of their song "Grinding Halt", retitled for that performance as "Desperate Journalist in Ongoing Meaningful Review Situation", on the John Peel radio show, with new lyrics parodying Morley's writing style after an unfavourable review of their debut album Three Imaginary Boys. A 2010s post-punk band, Desperate Journalist, have adapted this as their name.

== Publications ==
- Ask: The Chatter of Pop (1986)
- Nothing (2000)
- Words and Music: A History of Pop in the Shape of a City (2004)
- Joy Division: Piece by Piece: Writing About Joy Division 1977–2007 (2007)
- Joy Division: Fragments (with Christel Derenne) (2009)
- The North (And Almost Everything In It) (2013)
- Earthbound (2013)
- I'll Never Write My Memoirs by Grace Jones (with Paul Morley) (2015)
- The Age of Bowie (2016)
- The Awfully Big Adventure: Michael Jackson in the Afterlife (2019)
- A Sound Mind (2020)
- You Lose Yourself, You Reappear: Bob Dylan and the Voices of a Lifetime (2021)
- From Manchester With Love: The Life and Opinions of Tony Wilson (2021)
- The Islander: My Life in Music and Beyond by Chris Blackwell (with Paul Morley) (2022)
- Far Above The World: The Time and Space of David Bowie (2025)
