= Art of Noise discography =

- Studio albums: 5
- Extended plays: 1
- Compilation albums: 11
- Singles: 17

The discography of Art of Noise, a British synthpop group, consists of five studio albums, 11 compilation albums, one extended play (EP) and 17 singles.

== Albums ==
=== Studio albums ===
List of studio albums, with selected chart positions and certifications
Title	Album details	Peak chart positions									Certifications
Title	Album details	UK	AUS	AUT	CAN	GER	NLD	NZ	SWI	US	Certifications
Who's Afraid of the Art of Noise?	Released: 19 June 1984 (UK); Label: ZTT; Formats: CD, cassette, LP	27	—	—	—	—	30	35	—	85	BPI: Silver
In Visible Silence	Released: 14 April 1986 (UK); Label: China, Chrysalis; Formats: CD, cassette, LP	18	55	11	16	41	18	27	22	53	MC: Gold
In No Sense? Nonsense!	Released: 28 September 1987 (UK); Label: China, Chrysalis; Formats: CD, cassette, LP	55	—	—	—	48	51	—	27	134	
Below the Waste	Released: 11 September 1989 (UK); Label: China, Polydor; Formats: CD, cassette, LP	—	133	—	—	33	86	—	24	—	
The Seduction of Claude Debussy	Released: 28 June 1999 (UK); Label: ZTT; Formats: CD, cassette, MD, digital download	150	186	—	—	—	—	—	—	—	
"—" denotes a recording that did not chart or was not released in that territory.

=== Compilation albums ===
List of compilation albums, with selected chart positions
Title	Album details	Peak chart positions						
Title	Album details	UK	AUS	GER	NLD	NZ	SWI	US
Daft	Released: 15 December 1986 (UK); Label: ZTT; Formats: CD, cassette	—	—	—	—	—	—	—
Re-Works of Art of Noise	Released: 25 February 1987 (UK); Label: China, Chrysalis, Toshiba-EMI; Formats: CD, cassette, LP	—	—	—	—	—	—	—
The Best of the Art of Noise	Released: 21 November 1988 (UK); Label: China, Polydor; Formats: CD, cassette, LP	55	48	34	—	45	27	83
The Ambient Collection	Released: 25 June 1990 (UK); Label: China, Polydor; Formats: CD, cassette, LP	—	—	—	76	—	—	—
The FON Mixes	Released: 25 November 1991 (UK); Label: China; Formats: CD, cassette, LP	—	180	—	—	—	—	—
The Drum and Bass Collection	Released: 14 October 1996 (UK); Label: China; Formats: CD	—	178	—	—	—	—	—
State of the Art	Released: 4 August 1997 (UK); Label: China; Formats: CD	200	—	—	—	—	—	—
Bashful / Belief System / An Extra Pulse of Beauty	Released: 6 July 1999 (US); Label: ZTT; Formats: CD	—	—	—	—	—	—	—
Reduction	Released: 20 March 2000 (UK); Label: ZTT; Formats: CD	—	—	—	—	—	—	—
Reconstructed... For Your Listening Pleasure	Released: 19 January 2004 (UK); Label: ZTT; Formats: SACD	—	—	—	—	—	—	—
And What Have You Done with My Body, God?	Released: 7 August 2006 (UK); Label: ZTT; Formats: CD	—	—	—	—	—	—	—
Influence: Hits, Singles, Moments, Treasures...	Released: 19 July 2010 (UK); Label: ZTT, Salvo; Formats: CD	172	—	—	—	—	—	—
At The End of a Century	Released: 2 February 2015 (UK); Label: ZTT, Salvo; Formats: CD + DVD	—	—	—	—	—	—	—
"—" denotes a recording that did not chart or was not released in that territory.

== Extended plays ==
List of extended plays
Title	EP details
Into Battle with the Art of Noise	Released: 26 September 1983 (UK); Label: ZTT; Formats: 12"

== Singles ==
List of singles, with selected chart positions, showing year released and album name
Title	Year	Peak chart positions										Album
Title	Year	UK	AUT	BEL (FL)	GER	IRL	NLD	NZ	SWI	US	US Dance	Album
"Beat Box"	1984	92	—	—	—	—	—	—	—	— (Note: "Beat Box" did not enter the Billboard Hot 100, but peaked at number 101 on the Bubbling Under Hot 100 Singles chart.)	1	Who's Afraid of the Art of Noise?
"Close (to the Edit)"	1984	8	—	—	—	11	—	—	—	— (Note: "Close (to the Edit)" did not enter the Billboard Hot 100, but peaked at number 102 on the Bubbling Under Hot 100 Singles chart.)	4	Who's Afraid of the Art of Noise?
"Moments in Love"	1985	51	—	17	—	—	10	—	—	—	—	Who's Afraid of the Art of Noise?
"Legs"	1985	69	—	—	—	—	—	—	—	—	27	In Visible Silence
"Peter Gunn" (featuring Duane Eddy)	1986	8	10	—	17	6	—	3	17	50	2	In Visible Silence
"Paranoimia" (featuring Max Headroom)	1986	12	—	17	33	18	7	6	—	34	14	Re-Works of Art of Noise
"Legacy"	1986	95	—	—	—	—	—	—	—	—	45	Re-Works of Art of Noise
"Dragnet"	1987	60	—	—	—	—	84	25	29	—	—	In No Sense? Nonsense!
"Dragnet (The '88 Mix)"	1988	94	—	—	—	—	—	—	—	—	—	The Best of the Art of Noise
"Kiss" (featuring Tom Jones)	1988	5	4	5	16	8	6	1	11	31	18	The Best of the Art of Noise
"Paranoimia '89"	1989	88	—	—	41	—	—	—	—	—	—	The Best of the Art of Noise
"Yebo!" (featuring Mahlathini and the Mahotella Queens)	1989	63	—	—	49	—	—	—	—	—	—	Below the Waste
"Art of Love"	1990	67	—	—	—	—	—	—	—	—	—	The Ambient Collection
"Instruments of Darkness (All of Us Are One People)"	1991	45	—	—	—	—	—	—	—	—	42	The FON Mixes
"Shades of Paranoimia"	1992	53	—	—	—	—	—	—	—	—	—	The FON Mixes
"Metaforce" (featuring Rakim)	1999	53	—	—	—	—	—	—	—	—	—	The Seduction of Claude Debussy
"—" denotes a recording that did not chart or was not released in that territory.

== Music videos ==
List of music videos, showing year released and directors
Title	Year	Director(s)
"Beat Box"	1984	Anton Corbijn
"Close (to the Edit)" (version 1)	1984	Zbigniew Rybczyński
"Close (to the Edit)" (version 2)	1984	Matt Forrest
"Close (to the Edit)" (version 3)	1984	Andy Morahan
"Moments in Love"	1985	Tony van den Ende
"Legs" (version 1)	1985	George Barber, George Snow
"Legs" (version 2)	1985	George Barber, George Snow
"Peter Gunn" (featuring Duane Eddy)	1986	Matt Forrest
"Paranoimia" (featuring Max Headroom)	1986	Matt Forrest
"Legacy"	1986	George Snow
"Dragnet"	1987	Zbigniew Rybczyński
"Kiss" (featuring Tom Jones)	1988	Martin Brierly, Stephen Lowe
"Paranoimia '89"	1989	—N/a
"Yebo!" (featuring Mahlathini and the Mahotella Queens)	1989	—N/a
"Instruments of Darkness (All of Us Are One People)"	1991	George Snow
"Shades of Paranoimia"	1991	George Snow
"Art of Love"	1997	Stephan Rozmiarek, Stefan Goldby
"Metaforce" (featuring Rakim)	1999	John Bland
"into vision - the compleat compendium" (DVD)	2002	—N/a (performances recorded live in Chicago, the Coachella Festival, the Shepherds Bush Empire, and Fountain Studios)
