= Daft (album) =

Compilation album by Art of Noise
- Released: 15 December 1986
- Recorded: 1983–1984
- Genre: Synthpop, art pop, electro, sound collage
- Length: 61:20
- Label: ZTT; Island
- Producer: Trevor Horn

Art of Noise chronology
| Who's Afraid of the Art of Noise? (1984) | Daft (1986) | In Visible Silence (1986) |

Daft is a compilation collecting the Art of Noise LP Who's Afraid of the Art of Noise? (with one track, "Snapshot", appearing in a longer version than on the original UK LP, but previously released on the Japanese version), along with portions of the Into Battle with the Art of Noise EP and "Moments in Love" remix single. It gives a fairly thorough overview of the Trevor Horn period of the group, prior to its split from the ZTT label. The compilation is also notable for its liner notes by Paul Morley (under the pseudonym Otto Flake), attacking the new incarnation of the group. In 2003 the album was re-released on Super Audio CD.

Professional ratings
Review scores
| Source | Rating |
|---|---|
| Allmusic | 4/5 stars |

== Track listing ==
1. "Love" (aka "Moments in Love (Beaten)") – 7:00
  (Vocals sung by Camilla Pilkington)
2. "A Time for Fear (Who's Afraid)" – 4:45
  (Additional Material written by Morley, Anne Dudley, Gary Langan, J. J. Jeczalik)
  (Talking Voice on Intro: Fidel Castro)
  (Contains a brief music sample of "Everything Happens to Me", as performed by Yasuaki Shimizu & the Saxophonettes)
  (Contains a re-sung vocal sample of "Song from M.A.S.H.", written by Johnny Mandel and Mike Altman)
3. "Beat Box (Diversion One)" – 8:33
  (Contains a sample of "Rosanna", as performed by Toto)
4. "The Army Now" – 2:02
  (Additional Music composed & sampled by the Art of Noise)
  (Sampled Vocals performed by the Andrews Sisters)
5. "Donna" – 1:44
  (Additional Music composed by Gary Langan)
  (Contains a sample of "State of Independence", as performed by Donna Summer)
6. "Memento" – 2:12
7. "How to Kill" – 2:43
8. "Realisation" – 1:46
  (Written by Morley, Horn, Jeczalik)
9. "Who's Afraid (of the Art of Noise)" – 4:21
  (Written by Dudley, Jeczalik, Morley)
10. "Moments in Love" – 10:17
  (Vocals sung by Camilla Pilkington)
  (Contains a brief vocal sample of "Boogie Woogie Bugle Boy", as performed by the Andrews Sisters)
11. "Bright Noise" – 0:05
12. "Flesh in Armour" – 1:23
13. "Comes and Goes" – 1:18
14. "Snapshot" – 2:33
  (Written by Jeczalik, Morley, Langan, Bert Seager)
  (Contains a replayed sample of "Baba O'Riley", as performed by the Who)
15. "Close (To the Edit)" – 5:37
  (Talking Voices: Camilla Pilkington)
  (Contains a sample of "Leave It", as performed by Yes)
  (Contains a vocal sample of "Beer Barrel Polka", as performed by the Andrews Sisters)
16. "(Three Fingers Of) Love" (aka "Love Beat") – 4:44

Tracks 1, 3, 6–7, 10–13, and 15–16 Written, Composed, & Sampled by the Art of Noise (Horn, Morley, Jeczalik, Langan, Dudley)

Tracks 2–3, 6–9, and 14–15 from Who's Afraid of the Art of Noise? LP (with track 14, "Snapshot", appearing here in a longer form).

Tracks 4–5, and 10–13 from Into Battle with the Art of Noise EP.

Tracks 1 & 16 from Moments in Love 12" single.
