= The Ambient Collection =

Remix album by Art of Noise
- Released: 1990
- Genres: electronic, chill-out
- Length: 49:21
- Labels: China; Polydor
- Producers: Youth (compilation); Art of Noise (original tracks)

The Ambient Collection is a 1990 album compiling songs by the Art of Noise into a chill-out mix. The album was compiled and remixed by Youth, using songs from the Art of Noise albums In Visible Silence and In No Sense? Nonsense!, as well as the song "Island" from Below the Waste. The album spawned one single, "Art of Love", which uses elements from the Art Of Noise tracks "One Earth", "Crusoe", "Opus 4" and "Camilla".

Professional ratings
Review scores
Source	Rating
Allmusic	4/5 stars
'Entertainment Weekly	(A−)
Select	2/5

== Track listing ==
1. Opus 4 (0:42)
2. Opus for 4 (3:46)
3. Nothing Was Going to Stop Them Then, Anyway (0:44)
4. Crusoe (5:03)
5. Island (5:40)
6. Camilla (7:56)
7. Ode to Don Jose (4:14)
8. Counterpoint (0:56)
9. Roundabout 727/Ransom in the Sand (2:08)
10. Eye of a Needle (4:43)
11. Robinson Crusoe (4:02)
12. A Nation Rejects (4:45)
13. Art of Love (7" Edition) (4:36)

== Credits ==
- Compiled and remixed by Youth
- All tracks produced, arranged and performed by the Art of Noise except:
  - "Island," "Robinson Crusoe," "A Nation Rejects" produced by Anne Dudley, J. J. Jeczalik, and Ted Hayton
  - "Art of Love (7" Edition) additional production by Youth
- Written by:
  - Tracks 1, 6, 10, 13: Anne Dudley, J. J. Jeczalik, Gary Langan
  - Tracks 2–5, 7, 9, 12: Anne Dudley, J. J. Jeczalik
  - Track 8: Anne Dudley
  - Track 9a: J.J. Jeczalik
  - Track 11: Gian Piero Reverberi, Robert Mellin
