= And What Have You Done with My Body, God? =

Compilation album by Art of Noise
- Released: 7 Aug 2006
- Recorded: 1983–1986
- Genre: Synthpop, art pop, electro, sound collage, new wave
- Length: 202:38
- Label: ZTT
- Producer: Art of Noise

Art of Noise chronology
The Seduction of Claude Debussy (1999)	And What Have You Done with My Body, God? (2006)

And What Have You Done with My Body, God? is a 4 CD collection of unreleased tracks, demos and scrapped masters by Art of Noise. It also features the complete cassette versions of three EPs (Into Battle with the Art of Noise, That Was Close, and The Tortoise and the Hare) for the first time on CD.

The project was conceived, researched and compiled by music journalist Ian Peel, who also wrote the box set's accompanying 36-page book, which featured new interviews with all of the original members.

== Track listing ==
All songs written by Anne Dudley, Trevor Horn, J. J. Jeczalik, Gary Langan, and Paul Morley.

=== Disc 1: The Very Start of Noise ===
1. Beat Box (One Made Earlier) [2:18]
2. Once Upon a Lime [3:21]
3. War (Demo 2) [1:27]
4. Close to the Edge [2:19]
5. Confession [1:02]
6. Moments in Love [7:52]
7. Sign of Relief [1:27]
8. Who's Afraid of Scale? [4:36]
9. So What Happens Now? (take two) [4:23]
10. The Subject Has Moved Left [1:43]
11. It's not fair [4:27]
12. Close to the Edge (Ruff Mix) [5:54]
13. A Time for Fear (Who's Afraid) [4:32]
14. Moments in Bed [6:11]
15. Hands Off Love [0:55]

=== Disc 2: Found Sounds & Field Trips ===
1. Moments in Love (12" B-side idea) [3:10]
2. Tears Out of a Stone [2:56]
3. Samba #2 [0:39]
4. The Chain of Chance [4:36]
5. Fairlight-in-the-Being [4:37]
6. Diversions 3 [3:53]
7. Close (To Being Compiled) [3:47]
8. Diversions 5 [3:46]
9. Damn It All! [1:42]
10. Structure [1:13]
11. The Angel Reel: Hymn 1 (take 2) [0:36]
12. The Angel Reel: Hymn 3 [1:20]
13. The Angel Reel: Fairground [0:43]
14. And What Have You Done with My Body, God? [4:40]
15. Klimax [1:48]
16. Who Knew? [2:36]

=== Disc 3: Who's Afraid of...Goodbye ===
1. War (Demo 4) [4:39]
2. The Focus of Satisfaction [11:01]
3. Moments in Love (7" master rejected) [3:44]
4. It Stopped [4:27]
5. The Uncertainty of Syrup [1:21]
6. The Long Hello [4:34]
7. The Vacuum Devine [0:47]
8. The Ambassadors Reel: Beat Box [3:54]
9. The Ambassadors Reel: Medley [10:56]
10. The Ambassadors Reel: Oobly [1:20]
11. Goodbye Art of Noise [0:37]
12. Moments in Love (incomplete) [1:06]

=== Disc 4: Extended Play ===
Into Battle with the Art of Noise:

1. Battle [0:27]
2. Beat Box [4:48]
3. The Army Now [2:02]
4. Donna [1:44]
5. Moments in Love [5:10]
6. Bright Noise [0:05]
7. Flesh in Armour [1:24]
8. Comes and Goes [1:19]
9. Moment in Love [1:27]

That Was Close:

10. Diversion Eight / Diversion Two / Closest / Close-Up / Close (To the Edit) / Closed [20:44]

The Tortoise and the Hare:

11. Moments in Love (From Battle To Beaten) [14:21]
12. Love Beat [5:15]
13. In Case We Sneezed [0:31]

Besides Close:

14. A Time to Hear (Who's Listening) [3:31]
15. (Do) Donna (Do) [3:12]
16. Battle Outtakes [0:25]
