= The Seduction of Claude Debussy =

1999 studio album by Art of Noise

Studio album by Art of Noise
- Released: 28 June 1999 (United Kingdom); 1 December 1999 (Japan)
- Recorded: 1998–1999
- Genres: Atmospheric drum and bass; electronica; breakbeat; alternative hip hop
- Length: 56:42
- Labels: ZTT; Universal Records (USA); Mushroom (Australia); SMEJ (Japan)
- Producers: Trevor Horn; Anne Dudley

Art of Noise chronology
Below the Waste (1989)	The Seduction of Claude Debussy (1999)	And What Have You Done with My Body, God? (2006)

Professional ratings
Review scores
Source	Rating
AllMusic	link
Hiponline	link
Q	3/5 stars
Salon	link Archived 2012-10-06 at the Wayback Machine

The Seduction of Claude Debussy is the fifth and final studio album by Art of Noise, released in June 1999 in the United Kingdom and the United States, and December 1999 in Japan. It features a line-up of Trevor Horn, Anne Dudley, Paul Morley and Lol Creme, along with other appearances from John Hurt, soprano Sally Bradshaw, Rakim, and Donna Lewis. As it had been 10 years since their last album, this album carries a completely different sound to that which had defined their four previous albums. The group blended the music of French impressionist composer Claude Debussy with drum and bass, opera, hip hop, jazz, and narration, to create a concept album which they described as "the soundtrack to a film that wasn't made about the life of Claude Debussy."

The album was announced in mid-1998 as being due for release by the end of that year, but did not release until mid-1999. The album was only released on CD and MiniDisc formats. The UK edition was released 28 June 1999, while the US edition was released 29 June 1999. The Japan edition was released 1 December 1999.

In the U.S., prior to the retail release of the album, a promotional-only item was sent out in a grey, anti-static zip-lock bag. The polybag contained several sheets of 5×5" paper listing people and groups who were inspirations; two cardboard cover pockets, one containing the album, and the other an EP titled Sources & Methods with the following five tracks: "Moments In Love", "Close (To The Edit)", "(Three Fingers of) Love", "Beat Box (Diversion 1)", and "A Time For Fear (Who's Afraid)".

== Track listings ==
Standard track listing
No.	Title	Length
1.	"Il Pleure (At the Turn of the Century)"	8:02
2.	"Born on a Sunday"	4:40
3.	"Dreaming in Colour"	6:42
4.	"On Being Blue"	4:58
5.	"Continued in Colour"	1:19
6.	"Rapt: In the Evening Air"	4:21
7.	"Metaforce"	3:44
8.	"The Holy Egoism of Genius"	7:56
9.	"La Flûte de Pan"	2:45
10.	"Metaphor on the Floor"	2:06
11.	"Approximate Mood Swing No. 2"	2:14
12.	"Pause"	2:30
13.	"Out of This World (Version 138)"	5:27

=== US edition ===
The first US edition of the album, released 29 June 1999, included a bonus disc with remixes of "Metaforce".

US bonus disc
No.	Title	Length
1.	"Metaforce"	4:55
2.	"Metaforce: The Sighs of a Metaphor" (remix by Roni Size)	6:37
3.	"Metaforce: The Size of a Metaphor" (remix by Roni Size)	5:41
4.	"Metaforce: The Beat of a Metaphor" (remix by Rhythm Masters)	6:54

=== Japanese edition ===
The Japanese edition, released 1 December 1999, was a CD-Extra with two bonus tracks. Some tracks were presented in slightly different mixes.

Japanese edition track listing
No.	Title	Length
13.	"Metaforce – The Size of a Metaphor" (mix by Roni Size)	5:40
14.	"Dreaming: Colour Green" (Brothers in Rhythm via Art of Noise)	5:22
15.	"Out of This World (Version 138)"	5:25

The CD-ROM portion of the disc contained the "Metaforce" video in a QuickTime format.

=== The Production of Claude Debussy ===
A promotional version mixed by Trevor Horn, released several months in advance in the US, Canada, and UK, contained the same tracks in a slightly different sequence and with some mixing differences, with "Born on a Sunday" and with "Dreaming in Colour" being one continuous track instead of split into two.

This version, retitled The Production of Claude Debussy and described as a "producer's cut", was included on the 2015 compilation Art of Noise at the End of A Century. It was given a stand-alone digital release in 2022.

The Production of Claude Debussy track listing
No.	Title	Length
1.	"Il Pleure (At the Turn of the Century)"	8:03
2.	"Born on a Sunday"	4:37
3.	"Dreaming in Colour"	8:33
4.	"On Being Blue"	5:09
5.	"Rapt: In the Evening Air"	4:21
6.	"Metaforce"	3:44
7.	"Holy Egoism of Genius"	7:56
8.	"La Flûte de Pan"	2:31
9.	"Out of This World (Version 138)"	5:16
10.	"Metaphor on the Floor"	2:06
11.	"Approximate Mood Swing No. 2"	2:14
12.	"Pause"	2:31

== Related compilations ==
=== Reduction ===
Reduction, released in 2000, was a limited edition album consisting mainly of outtakes from The Seduction of Claude Debussy. It was available as a separate item in some regions, while in others it was released as a 2-disc set with the original album.

Reduction track listing
No.	Title	Length
1.	"Identity Crisis"
2.	"Motive"
3.	"(New York London Paris) Spleen"
4.	"Saluting the Point of No Return"
5.	"Man And Boy"
6.	"Information"
7.	"And I Placed My Fingers on Her Eyes as Though I Was Touching the Silent Controls of a TV Set"

Reduction (French edition)
No.	Title	Length
7.	"Dreaming: Maroon"
8.	"And I Placed My Fingers on Her Eyes as Though I Was Touching the Silent Controls of a TV Set"

=== An Extra Pulse of Beauty ===
From 24 June through 30 September 1999, people who purchased the US edition of The Seduction of Claude Debussy from certain vendors received, by email, a code that could be used to order a custom CD-R containing 5 to 12 (initially, 5 to 10) previously unreleased tracks from the group's early years, with one of three titles, each with its own cover art: Bashful, Belief System, or An Extra Pulse of Beauty. The compilation was released digitally under the latter title.

An Extra Pulse of Beauty track listing
No.	Title	Length
1.	"A Time to Hear (Who's Listening?)"	3:36
2.	"Beat Box (One Made Earlier)"	2:29
3.	"Who's Afraid of Scale?"	4:39
4.	"Resonance"	2:16
5.	"Beat Box (Diverted)"	8:14
6.	"Memory Loss"	1:29
7.	"Structure"	1:16
8.	"A Time to Clear (Up)"	4:21
9.	"Beat Box (Diversion)"	4:11
10.	"The Subject Has Moved Left"	1:48
11.	"Closer (To the Edit)"	6:25
12.	"Resin"	3:11

== Personnel ==
Featured artists

- Anne Dudley – Keyboards, Orchestral Arrangement, Voice, Piano
- Trevor Horn – Bass, Voice, Keyboards
- Paul Morley – Keyboards, Voice
- Lol Creme – Guitar, Keyboards, Voice

Guest Personnel

- John Hurt – Narrator
- Sally Bradshaw – Vocals (tracks: 1 to 5, 8 to 13)
- Jamie Muhoberac – Keyboards (tracks: 1, 3, 5, 6, 8)
- Rakim – Vocals (tracks: 6, 7, 10)
- Donna Lewis – Vocals (tracks: 3, 5)

== Chart positions ==
The album reached No.150 on the UK Albums Chart on 7 October 1999. The "Metaforce" single (ZTT 129 CD) reached No.53 on the UK Singles Chart on 26 June 1999.
