= The Best of The Art of Noise =

1988 greatest hits album by Art of Noise

The Best of the Art of Noise (1988)

Greatest hits album by Art of Noise
- Released: November 1988
- Recorded: 1983–1988
- Genre: Synth-pop
- Label: China; Polydor
- Producer: Art of Noise

Art of Noise chronology
In No Sense? Nonsense! (1987)	The Best of the Art of Noise (1988) (1988)	Below the Waste (1989)

The Best of the Art of Noise (1992)

Greatest hits album by Art of Noise
- Released: 1992
- Recorded: 1986–1991
- Genre: Experimental synth-pop
- Label: China
- Producer: Art of Noise

Art of Noise chronology
The FON Mixes (1991)	The Best of the Art of Noise (1992) (1992)	The Drum and Bass Collection (1996)

Professional ratings
Review scores
Source	Rating
AllMusic	4.5/5 stars

The Best of the Art of Noise is the name of a series of compilation albums with songs by the British synth-pop band Art of Noise. The first version was released on the China Records label in November 1988.

The Best of the Art of Noise was released with at least ten different track listing variations from 1988 to 1997. The first version was on LP format and contained 7" single mixes, while the corresponding compact disc release that year contained the extended or 12" single remixes of all of the tracks. However, LP releases in territories such as Korea and Argentina featured a combination of both track listings. A Japanese CD version from 1991 was identical to the standard CD but contained two more mixes of "Kiss" as bonus tracks.

In 1992, China Records reissued The Best of and added "Yebo," "Instruments of Darkness" and "Robinson Crusoe," while omitting the three tracks that were licensed from ZTT Records and included on the 1988 release: "Beatbox," "Moments in Love" and "Close (To the Edit)." Once again, a number of different variations were issued. The United Kingdom and Holland issued a double disc limited-edition version with both the standard disc of 7" mixes and a second disc of extended and 12" remixes.

The compilation has also been issued with two different color variations on the cover. All editions prior to 1992 were issued with a blue cover, while most editions afterward had a pink cover. The German and Australian editions as well as the UK/Holland limited edition two disc set all retained the blue cover.

== Track listing ==
=== 1988 LP Version (Blue Cover) ===
Art Works 7"

1. "Opus 4" 2:00
2. "Beat Box" 3:56 [AKA: "Beat Box (Diversion Six)" aka "Beat Box (Diversion Ten)"]
3. "Moments in Love" 4:39
4. "Close (to the Edit)" 3:54
5. "Peter Gunn" (featuring Duane Eddy) 3:55
6. "Paranoimia" (featuring Max Headroom) 3:17
7. "Legacy" 3:26
8. "Dragnet '88" (from the motion picture Dragnet) 2:59
9. "Kiss" (featuring Tom Jones) 3:29
10. "Something Always Happens" 2:29
- The 1989 Korean version substitutes the 12" mixes of "Moments in Love" and "Paranoimia."
- The 1991 Argentine version substitutes the 12" mixes, except for "Moments in Love," and omits "Opus 4" and "Legacy."

=== 1988 Cassette Version (Blue Cover) ===
Art Works

1. "Opus 4" 2:00
2. "Beat Box" 3:56
3. "Moments in Love" 4:39
4. "Close (to the Edit)" 3:54
5. "Peter Gunn (The Twang Mix)" (featuring Duane Eddy) 7:28
6. "Paranoimia (Extended Version)" (featuring Max Headroom) 6:40
7. "Legacy" 3:26
8. "Dragnet '88" (from the motion picture Dragnet) 2:59
9. "Kiss (The AON Mix)" (featuring Tom Jones) 8:09
10. "Something Always Happens" 2:29

=== 1988 CD Version (Blue Cover) ===
Art Works 12"

1. "Opus 4" 2:00
2. "Beatbox (Diversion One)" 8:33
3. "Moments in Love" 7:00 [Beaten]
4. "Close (To the Edit)" 5:41
5. "Peter Gunn (The Twang Mix)" (featuring Duane Eddy) 7:28
6. "Paranoimia" (featuring Max Headroom) 6:40 [Extended Version]
7. "Legacy" 8:20 [Extended Version]
8. "Dragnet '88" (from the motion picture Dragnet) 7:15 [Art of Noise '88 12" Mix]
9. "Kiss (The AON Mix)" (featuring Tom Jones) 8:09
10. "Something Always Happens" 2:28
- Mix titles in brackets are unlisted on the cover.
- The 1991 Japanese version adds "Kiss (The Battery Mix)" (featuring Tom Jones) 8:17 and "Kiss" (featuring Tom Jones) 3:30 [7" Mix]

=== 1992 CD Version (Pink Cover) ===
Art Works

1. "Opus 4" 2:00
2. "Yebo" (featuring Mahlathini and The Mahotella Queens) 3:51 [single mix]
3. "Instruments of Darkness (All of us are one people)" 3:38 [remix by Prodigy]
4. "Robinson Crusoe" 3:47 [LP Version]
5. "Peter Gunn" (featuring Duane Eddy) 3:55
6. "Paranoimia" (featuring Max Headroom) 3:17
7. "Legacy" 3:24
8. "Dragnet '88" (from the motion picture Dragnet) 2:59
9. "Kiss" (featuring Tom Jones) 3:30
10. "Something Always Happens" 2:29
- Australian version has blue cover.
- The 1992 Japanese version adds:
1. "Kiss (The Battery Mix)" (featuring Tom Jones) 8:17
2. "Kiss" (featuring Tom Jones) 3:30 [7" Mix]
- The 1997 Japanese version adds:
1. "Yebo (The Trust Mix)" (featuring Mahlathini and The Mahotella Queens) 6:29
2. "Yebo (The Arkarna Dub)" (featuring Mahlathini and The Mahotella Queens) 8:44
3. "Kiss (The AON Mix)" (featuring Tom Jones) 8:09
- German version has blue cover, contains the 12" mixes, substitutes a new remix of "Instruments of Darkness" entitled "Instruments of Lightness (The Sequel) (The S1000 Power-Qqatsi Dub Mix)" (8:59) and a new mix of "Robinson Crusoe" entitled "Robinson Crusoe (White Noise Edit)" (6:04).

=== 1992 Limited Edition 2 CD Version (Blue & Pink Covers) ===
Disc One: The 7" Versions

1. "Opus 4" 2.00
2. "Yebo" (featuring Mahlathini and The Mahotella Queens) 3.51
3. "Instruments of Darkness (All of us are one people)" 3.38 [Prodigy remix]
4. "Robinson Crusoe" 3.47
5. "Peter Gunn" (featuring Duane Eddy) 3.55
6. "Paranoimia" (featuring Max Headroom) 3.17
7. "Legacy" 3.24
8. "Dragnet '88" (from the motion picture Dragnet) 2.59
9. "Kiss" (featuring Tom Jones) 3.30
10. "Something Always Happens" 2.29

Disc Two: The 12" Mixes

1. "Opus for Four" 3.11
2. "Yebo (Mbaqanga Mix)" (featuring Mahlathini and The Mahotella Queens) 7.21
3. "Instruments of Lightness (Life Beyond Transformation)" 7.33 [new remix by S1000]
4. "Crusoe" 5.02
5. "Peter Gunn (The Twang Mix)" (featuring Duane Eddy) 7.29
6. "Paranoimia" (featuring Max Headroom) 6.41
7. "Legacy" 8.20
8. "Dragnet '88" (from the motion picture Dragnet) 7.15
9. "Kiss (The AON mix)" (featuring Tom Jones) 8.09
10. "Art of Love" 8.08 [Youth Mix]
- Released only in the United Kingdom and Holland.
- "Yebo (Mbaqanga Mix)" is slightly longer than the standard version.
- "Legacy" is incorrectly titled "Legs" on the back cover.

== Charts ==
Chart performance for The Best of The Art of Noise
Chart (1988–1989)	Peak position
Australian Albums (ARIA)	48
Dutch Albums (Album Top 100)	39
European Albums (Music & Media)	81
German Albums (Offizielle Top 100)	34
New Zealand Albums (RMNZ)	45
Swiss Albums (Schweizer Hitparade)	27
UK Albums (OCC)	55
US Billboard 200	83
