= List of awards and nominations received by Rick Astley =

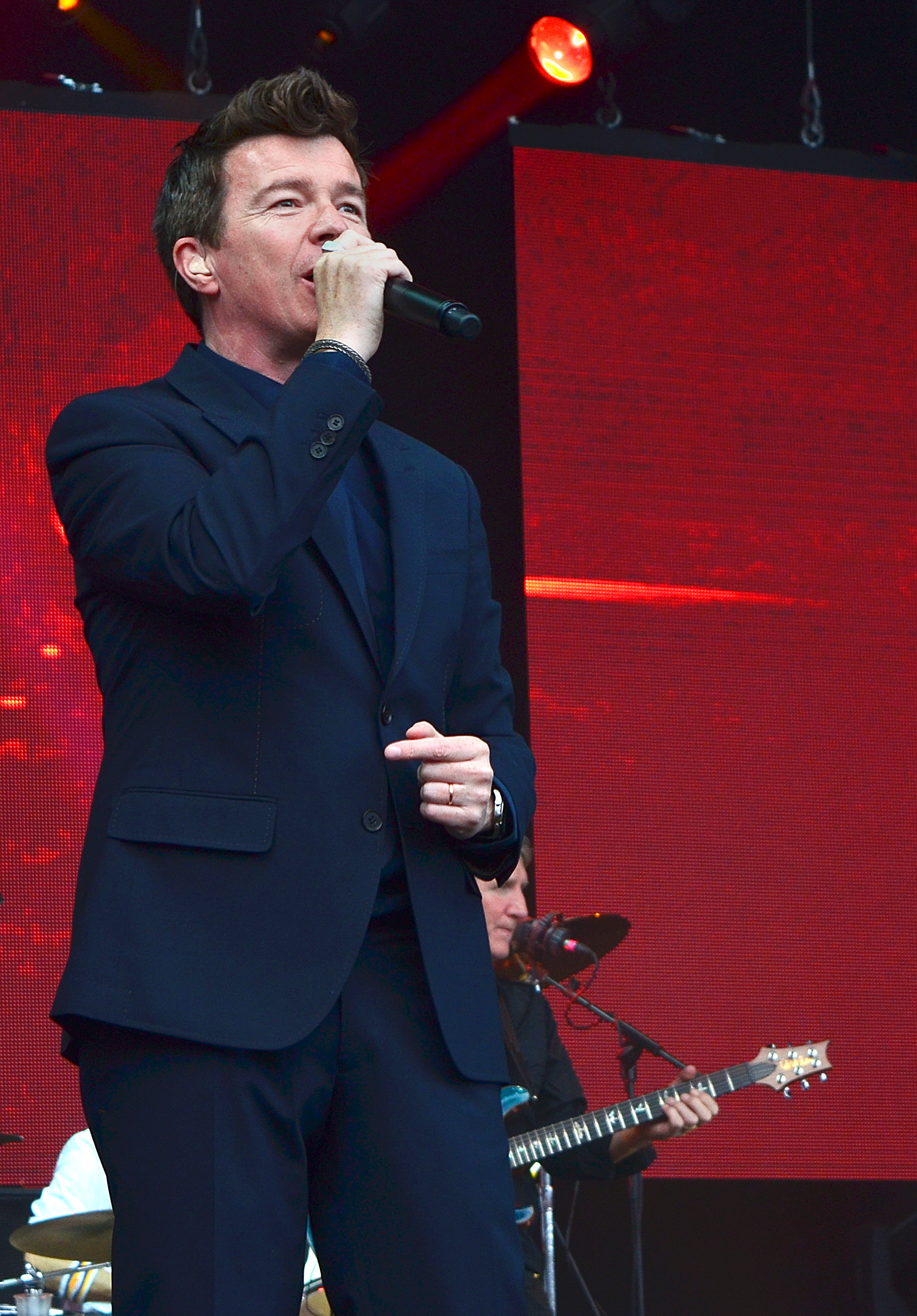
Astley in 2014

Rick Astley is an English singer and songwriter who has received many awards and nominations for his contributions to the music industry.

== ASCAP Pop Music Awards ==
The annual ASCAP Pop Music Awards honors the songwriters and publishers of the most performed pop songs.

Year	Nominee / work	Award	Result
1992	"Cry for Help"	Most Performed Song	Won

== American Music Awards ==
The American Music Awards is an annual American music awards show produced by Dick Clark Productions since 1974.

Year	Nominee/ work	Award	Result
1989	Himself	Favorite Pop/Rock New Artist	Nominated
1989	“Never Gonna Give you Up”	Favorite Pop/Rock Song	Nominated

== BBC Music Awards ==
The BBC Music Awards are the BBC's annual pop music awards, held every December, as a celebration of the musical achievements over the past twelve months. The event is coordinated by the BBC's music division, BBC Music.

Year	Nominee / work	Award	Result
2016	50	Album of the Year	Nominated

== BMI Awards ==
Broadcast Music, Inc. (BMI) is one of three United States performing rights organizations, along with ASCAP and SESAC. It collects license fees on behalf of songwriters, composers, and music publishers and distributes them as royalties to those members whose works have been performed.

Year	Nominee / work	Award	Result
1992	"Cry for Help"	Award-Winning Song	Won
1993	"Cry for Help"	1 Million-Air Award	Won
1994	"Hopelessly"	1 Million-Air Award	Won
1994	"Hopelessly"	Award-Winning Song	Won

== BT Digital Music Awards ==
Launched in 2002, the BT Digital Music Awards were held annually in the United Kingdom.

Year	Nominee / work	Award	Result
2002	www.rickastley.co.uk	People's Choice Award	Nominated

== Billboard Music Awards ==
The Billboard Music Awards are sponsored by Billboard magazine to honor artists based on Billboard Year-End Charts. The award ceremony was held from 1990 to 2007, until its reintroduction in 2011. Before and after that time span, winners have been announced by Billboard, both in the press and as part of their year-end issue.

Year	Nominee / work	Award	Result
1988	Himself	Top Pop Artist	Nominated
1988	Himself	Top Pop Artist – Male	Nominated
1988	Himself	Top Pop New Artist	Nominated
1988	Himself	Top Pop Singles Artist	Nominated
1988	Himself	Top Pop Singles Artist – Male	Nominated
1988	Himself	Top Adult Contemporary Artist	Nominated
1988	Himself	Top Adult Contemporary Artist – Male	Nominated
1988	Himself	Top Dance Club Play Artist	Won
1988	Himself	Top Dance Club Play Artist – Male	Won
1988	Himself	Top Dance Sales Artist	Won
1988	"Never Gonna Give You Up"	Top Dance Sales 12" Single	Won
1988	"Never Gonna Give You Up"	Top Pop Single	Nominated
1988	"Never Gonna Give You Up"	Top Adult Contemporary Single	Nominated
1988	"Never Gonna Give You Up"	Top Dance Club Play Single	Nominated

== Brit Awards ==
The Brit Awards are the British Phonographic Industry's annual pop music awards.

Year	Nominee / work	Award	Result
1988	Himself	British Breakthrough Act	Nominated
1988	Himself	British Male Solo Artist	Nominated
1988	"Never Gonna Give You Up"	British Single of the Year	Won

== Classic Pop Reader Awards ==
Classic Pop is a monthly British music magazine, which launched in October 2012. It was devised and founded by Ian Peel, who was also editor for the first 19 issues. Rik Flynn stepped in as editor until Issue 23 followed by current editor Steve Harnell. Ian Peel remains involved as Founder & Editor-at-Large.

Year	Nominee / work	Award	Result
2018	Himself	Artist of the Year	Won
2018	"She Makes Me"	Single of the Year	Won
2018	"She Makes Me"	Video of the Year	Won
2019	Himself	Best Solo Artist	Nominated

== AIM Independent Music Awards ==
The AIM Independent Music Awards, hosted by the Association of Independent Music (AIM), were established in 2011 to recognise artists signed to independent record labels in the United Kingdom. Most of the categories and nominations are selected by an independent judging panel, though some are decided by the public.

Year	Nominee / work	Award	Result
2017	Himself	Best Live Act	Nominated

== Ivor Novello Awards ==
The Ivor Novello Awards are presented annually by the British Academy of Songwriters, Composers and Authors and honor songwriting and composing.

Year	Nominee / work	Award	Result
1988	"Never Gonna Give You Up"	Best Contemporary Song	Nominated
1988	"Never Gonna Give You Up"	International Hit of the Year	Won
1988	"Never Gonna Give You Up"	The Best Selling 'A' Side	Won
1988	"Never Gonna Give You Up"	Most Performed Work	Won

== Grammy Awards ==
The Grammy Awards are awarded annually by the National Academy of Recording Arts and Sciences of the United States for outstanding achievements in the music industry. Often considered the highest music honor, the awards were established in 1958.

Year	Nominee / work	Award	Result
1989	Himself	Best New Artist	Nominated

== MTV Europe Music Awards ==
The MTV Europe Music Awards (EMA) were established in 1994 by MTV Networks Europe to celebrate the most popular music videos in Europe.

Year	Nominee / work	Award	Result
2008	Himself	Best Act Ever	Won

== Music & Media Year-End Awards ==
Music & Media was a pan-European magazine for radio, music and entertainment. It was published for the first time in 1984 as Eurotipsheet, but in 1986 it changed name to Music & Media.

Year	Nominee / work	Award	Result	Ref.
1987	"Never Gonna Give You Up"	Debut Single of the Year	Won	

== Robert Awards ==
The Robert Award is a Danish film prize awarded each year by the Film Academy of Denmark.

Year	Nominee / work	Award	Result
2004	Oh Happy Day	Best Original Score	Nominated

== Smash Hits Poll Winners Party ==
The Smash Hits Poll Winners Party was an awards ceremony held annually by British magazine Smash Hits, and broadcast on BBC One. Astley has won two awards.

Year	Nominee / work	Award	Result
1987	"Never Gonna Give You Up"	Best Single	Won
1987	"Never Gonna Give You Up"	Worst Single	Nominated
1987	"Never Gonna Give You Up"	Worst Video	Nominated
1987	Himself	Most Promising New Act	Nominated
1987	Himself	Best Dressed Person	Nominated
1987	Himself	Worst Male Singer	Nominated
1987	Himself	Best Male Singer	Nominated
1988	Himself	Best Male Singer	Nominated
1988	Himself	Worst Male Solo Singer	Nominated
1988	Himself	Most Fanciable Male	Nominated
1988	Himself	Most Completely Useless Person	Nominated
1988	Himself	Best Dressed Person	Nominated
1988	Himself	Worst Dressed Person	Won
1988	Himself	Most Very Horrible Thing	Nominated
1988	Himself	Worst Haircut	Nominated
1989	Himself	Worst Haircut	Nominated
1989	Himself	The Most Completely Useless Person	Nominated
1989	Himself	Best Male Solo Singer	Nominated
1989	Himself	Worst Male Solo Singer	Nominated
1990	Himself	Worst Male Solo Singer	Nominated

== Silver Clef Awards ==
The O2 Silver Clef Awards is an annual UK music awards lunch which has been running since 1976.

Year	Nominee / work	Award	Result
2025	Himself	Outstanding Achievement	Won

== Virgin Media Music Awards ==
The Virgin Media Music Awards was the annual music awards run by Virgin Media. The winners was declared on its official site "Virgin Media".

Year	Nominee / work	Award	Result
2008	Himself	Legend of the Year	Nominated
