= Paranomia =

Paranomia may refer to:

- The medical condition verbal paraphasia, an aspect of aphasia, where the patient speaks a word different from the one they intended to say
- A misspelling of the 1986 Art of Noise single Paranoimia
- A translation of "para nomos" (alongside the normative), a term in Greek philosophy, sometimes meaning lawlessness
