= Who's Afraid of the Art of Noise? =

1984 studio album by Art of Noise

Studio album by Art of Noise
- Released: 19 June 1984
- Recorded: 28 February 1983 – 1 April 1984
- Genres: Synth-pop; experimental rock; new wave; electronic
- Length: 41:15
- Labels: ZTT; Island
- Producer: Art of Noise

Art of Noise chronology
Into Battle with the Art of Noise (1983)	Who's Afraid of the Art of Noise? (1984)	Daft (1985)

Singles from Who's Afraid of the Art of Noise?
- 1. "Beat Box" Released: December 1983; 2. "Close (to the Edit)" Released: October 1984; 3. "Moments in Love" Released: 1 April 1985

Who's Afraid of the Art of Noise? is the debut studio album by the English avant-garde synth-pop group Art of Noise, released on 19 June 1984 by ZTT Records. It features the singles "Close (to the Edit)" which reached No. 8 on the UK Singles Chart in November 1984 and the double A-sided "Moments in Love"/"Beat Box", which made it to No. 51 in April 1985 in the UK.

The statue depicted on the album cover was photographed inside the monumental cemetery of Staglieno, in the Italian city of Genoa (tomba Famiglia Drago).

== Critical reception ==
Professional ratings
Review scores
Source	Rating
Christgau's Record Guide	B
Pitchfork	8.6/10

In a retrospective review, Charles Waring of Record Collector magazine gave the album four out of five stars and called it a "techno-pop classic". He said that it encapsulates both the popularity of the Fairlight CMI synthesizer and popular music in 1984—"the dawn of a new pop sensibility where sequencers, samplers and drum machines held sway". Slant Magazine's Sal Cinquemani also gave it four stars and said that it was "as subtly influential as Kraftwerk's Trans-Europe Express". He found its "blend of experimental rock and New Wave" both "brash" and innovative, and said that the album is "at times irksome but always groundbreaking." In his five-star review of the album, AllMusic's Ned Raggett called it an "entertaining and often frightening and screwed-up package", and said that "rarely has something aiming for modern pop status also sought to destroy and disturb so effectively." Ian Wade of The Quietus viewed it as an influential "brilliant racket of" what contemporary listeners of the album believe would be the sound of the future, and called its music "thrillingly inventive, reasonably danceable and full of interesting bits to laugh, love and dance to."

Pitchfork critic Tom Ewing gave the album's deluxe reissue a score of 8.6 out of 10 and said that it "flirts with annoyance and even boredom", but "could also be thrilling", and concluded in his review that it is "as sly, stirring, and occasionally infuriating now as it was on release." The Village Voice critic Robert Christgau said that, although its "concatenation of musical-instrument imitations and collapsing new sound effects" begets occasional interest and groove, only "Close (to the Edit)" sustains its performance.

== Track listing ==
All tracks are written by Anne Dudley, Trevor Horn, J. J. Jeczalik, Gary Langan and Paul Morley.

Side one: A Time to Hear
No.	Title	Length
1.	"A Time for Fear (Who's Afraid)"	4:43
2.	"Beat Box (Diversion One)"	8:33
3.	"Snapshot"	1:00
4.	"Close (To the Edit)"	5:41

Side two: Who's Listening
No.	Title	Length
5.	"Who's Afraid (of the Art of Noise?)"	4:22
6.	"Moments in Love"	10:17
7.	"Memento"	2:14
8.	"How to Kill"	2:44
9.	"Realisation"	1:41

1994 Japanese edition bonus track
No.	Title	Length
10.	"Close Up"	7:42

== Charts ==
1984–1987 chart performance for Who's Afraid of the Art of Noise?
Chart (1984–1987)	Peak position
Dutch Albums (Album Top 100)	30
European Albums (Eurotipsheet)	89
New Zealand Albums (RMNZ)	35
UK Albums (Official Charts)	27
US Billboard 200	85
US Top R&B/Hip-Hop Albums (Billboard)	22

2011 chart performance for Who's Afraid of the Art of Noise?
Chart (2011)	Peak position
UK Independent Albums (Official Charts)	37
