= Ian Peel (journalist) =

British music journalist

- Born: 1972 (age 53–54); United Kingdom
- Occupations: Magazine journalist; music author
- Known for: Founder of Classic Pop magazine, ZTT Records

Ian Peel (born 1972) is a British music journalist. He is founder of the magazines Classic Pop and Long Live Vinyl and is a writer with special interests in Eighties pop music, ZTT Records, and Paul McCartney's experimental works.

He was label manager of ZTT Records - and its sister label Stiff Records - and has consulted to the label since 1991.

He has been a regular columnist for The Guardian, DJ Mag, Record Collector, net and Music Business International (sister publication of Music Week). His work has also appeared in The Times, BlackBook and Sound on Sound.

== ZTT Records ==
Since 1991, Ian Peel has worked for ZTT Records, the record label founded in 1983 by Trevor Horn, Paul Morley and Jill Sinclair. DJ Food described Peel as "keyholder to the ZTT vaults and curator of the label's reissue series for the last 30 years or more... Ian knows the catalogue and the archive inside out, having spent years cataloguing it from the master tapes, along the way discovering all manner of hidden, lost or unreleased treasures."

He began by writing about the label for Record Collector magazine in 1987, and then penned and produced three issues of a ZTT fanzine in the early 1990s. This led to first working for the label on Frankie Goes To Hollywood's Bang! and Reload! compilations released in 1993.

He then went on to create further releases for Frankie Goes to Hollywood (including Sexmix and the Inside the Pleasuredome box set) and all of the label's artists, notably 808 State, ACT, Adamski, All Saints, Art of Noise, The Buggles, The Frames, Kirsty MacColl, MC Tunes, Propaganda, Shades of Rhythm and Lisa Stansfield. For 808 State's Blueprint he elicited input from Moby, Aphex Twin and Orbital.

Of his work curating the Propaganda back catalogue, co-founder Ralf Dörper said "the curator Ian Peel did a very good job. Respect." while The Quietus explained how "curator Ian Peel's exhaustive research match the care and attention he has lavished on other ZTT re-releases, and the wealth of material he has accumulated shed fascinating light on the working methods of both the band and the label."

Peel has worked on several live events celebrating the label's history including the Produced By Trevor Horn concert at Wembley Arena in London in 2008, an aborted "ZTT takeover of Trafalgar Square" with the Institute of Contemporary Arts the following year, and The Buggles' 'The Lost Gig' at which he arranged for Orchestral Manoeuvres in the Dark to perform as opening act, and for Horn to sing backing vocals on a performance of Duel by Claudia Brücken and Paul Humphreys.

His curation of the visual style and ethos of the label has included exhibitions of cover art in London and Tokyo called The Art of ZTT and a DVD titled The Television is Watching You featuring videos directed by Johnny Depp, Anton Corbijn, Brian De Palma, Godley & Creme, Wayne Hemingway, Zbigniew Rybczyński, Andy Morahan and Bernard Rose.

His compilation album series for the label have included three double-album volumes of The Art of the 12" and a set of three double albums for the label's thirtieth anniversary: the London, Tokyo and New York editions of The Organisation of Pop. As Craig Haggis wrote of The Organisation of Pop:

"I guess squeezing as much as possible in was always going to be an enormous task for Peel and his cohorts, and it's gratifying to see Grace Jones’ sleek Slave to the Rhythm included and other, bigger, hits from Seal, Tom Jones and a beautiful ballad by Shane MacGowan and Sinead O’Connor.

A label notable for its use of catalogue numbering, Peel continued Paul Morley's Action Series and Incidental Series at the behest of Jill Sinclair and started several of his own: the Definition Series includes more than 100 digital editions, while the Element Series ran for 50 physical releases across 10 years. In 2013 he signed FEMME and Aaron Horn's A Theory to the label, assigning the former to the Action Series and the latter to the Incidental Series. That year, Terra listed FEMME as one of "the most interesting women in music right now" alongside such artists as Grimes and MIA.

In 2023 he devised and issued 40 weekly digital singles and albums to mark the label's 40th anniversary. These included previously unreleased works by All Saints, Apollo 440, Art of Noise, Aurora, Das Psych-Oh! Rangers, Davids Daughters, Thomas Fehlmann, Inga Humpe, Instinct, Thomas Leer, Leilani Sen (which reached No. 13 on the Amazon Pop Chart), Nasty Rox Inc., Tara Newley, The Orb, Anne Pigalle, Andrew Poppy, Propaganda, Sexus, Shades of Rhythm, Sun Electric and Time Unlimted.

In an article titled Ian Peel's One-Man Campaign Takes Another Brilliant Twist, Kris Needs wrote:

"Considering that everything which ZTT touched during their early 80s purple patch immediately seemed to swell to widescreen proportions, it's fortuitous that Ian Peel, though only a teenage record-buyer at the time, shares their panoramic visions when it comes to the reissue programme he's been lovingly masterminding. It seems he won't rest until every reel from production supremo Trevor Horn's archives has been distilled into one of his lavish double-disc sets, his accompanying sleevenotes always an invaluable source of facts and memorabilia."

Peel's ZTT recordings archive was profiled by The Word in 2010:

"What Ian inherited was a ton of rotting cardboard boxes and a cataloguing nightmare," reported Andrew Harrison. "What he found, though, is dazzling to anyone who loves the work of Trevor Horn and the profligate madness of ZTT. With its antiquated floppies and hard discs the size and weight of lorry tyres, (Peel's tape archive) crystallises a pause between the old world of Take 1 and Take 2 and the future in which everything would be infinitely malleable."

== Classic Pop magazine ==
Peel devised and founded Classic Pop in 2011, before its launch in 2012. In an article titled "Classic Pop Magazine Bravely Charts a Course in Ebbing Waters", one music blog wrote of the magazine's launch, "In the case of Classic Pop, at least it comes by its pedigree honestly since it's edited by Mr. Ian Peel."

He was Editor for the first 19 issues when he moved to the role of Founder & Editor-at-Large. He also devised and was Editor of the magazine's first eight spin-off special editions, which covered Kate Bush, David Bowie, Madonna, Paul McCartney, Prince, George Michael and Elton John.

Peel's interviews for Classic Pop have included The Human League, Annie Lennox and Spandau Ballet. He has also interviewed contemporary pop artists for the magazine including Sophie Ellis-Bextor, Gorillaz and Ellie Goulding.

His features have included The Complete Guide to The KLF, Lost & Found: Soul Mining by The The, and Classic Album: The Lexicon Of Love – ABC while articles on the more esoteric reaches of pop music have spotlighted Frazier Chorus, It's Immaterial and the world of James Bond music.

As well as devising most of Classic Pop's sections or 'departments', Peel started the magazine's annual awards, ran its Synthpop Summit ("reuniting Howard Jones, Blancmange, Heaven 17 and Thomas Dolby for a think-tank") and its ongoing list editions, such as Top 100 Albums of the Eighties, and Top 50 12"s of the Eighties.

Cover art was given a regular section in the magazine from early on, Peel - having previously written for The Guardian newspaper on the subject - interviewing designers such as Peter Saville and Neville Brody.

Peel was the author of Classic Pop's Live Aid anniversary publication, compiling a detailed timeline of the event. As he wrote in the preface, "Live Aid's effect on pop music was immeasurable. For some performers, it became a swansong, for others a fresh start. Either way, the world stopped what it was doing and listened to pop music: Sade and The Style Council went from sultry to iconic. U2 and Queen, from the music papers to the tabloid papers. And life was never the same again."

In 2013, The Independent newspaper described how "Ian Peel juggles being label manager of ZTT Records, the imprint associated with Eighties über-producer Trevor Horn, and Stiff Records, with editing Classic Pop, the 'Eighties, Electronic, Eclectic' magazine. Classic Pop broke away from the music monthlies routinely and regularly doing cover stories on Bob Dylan, Pink Floyd or the Rolling Stones."

Interviewed by The Independent, Peel described his motives for starting the magazine:

The gap in the market was very clear to me because I was falling through it. Not all Eighties music was great but for too long, classic pop music has been sidelined and mistreated by the mainstream media. Every now and then, a TV or radio station does an Eighties night and it turns out to be a total disappointment – just a crude re-run of people joking about mullets and leg-warmers. The media has completely misread the public's interest in Eighties pop,” he says. “The kids who were into pop music then are now adults, with appropriately sophisticated tastes. They want to celebrate and see how the music of their youth has developed, not feel forced to cringe about it. Pop stars in the Eighties had an individual sense of style and substance.

The challenges of working as Founder and Editor-at-Large he described as "more theoretical and philosophical, compared to the logistical and practical challenges the Editor has. By that I mean thinking about the balance of content, the attitude, the tone, and the style of the magazine".

== Paul McCartney's experimental works ==
Peel is a commentator on Paul McCartney's experimental oeuvre, as author of the 2002 biography The Unknown Paul McCartney: McCartney and the Avant-Garde and having participated in TV and radio documentaries.

The Unknown Paul McCartney: McCartney and the Avant-Garde was described by BBC Music as an "engrossing round-up of the numerous side projects which have distracted Paul McCartney's active imagination over the last 35 years" and as "an odd and interesting re-framing of McCartney as experimentalist".

It is the only book to offer an in-depth history and analysis of McCartney's work in the field of experimental and avant-garde music, notably under the pseudonyms Thrillington and The Fireman, on projects such as Liverpool Sound Collage and Carnival of Light (with The Beatles), and as occasional collaborator with Allen Ginsberg, Brian Wilson and Yoko Ono. The foreword was written by David Toop.

One review commented that "Peel goes to lengths to put forward the argument that though the seemingly 'constantly cheerful one' may have been responsible for the MOR apocalypse of Wings, experimentation in other genres was never far away." Another noted that "Although Peel spends much of the book setting stages, discussing Cage, Eno, IDM and so on, who else would even have dreamt up such a thesis?"

While McCartney was not directly involved in the biography, The Guardian remarked in 2007 that "His implicit approval... suggested an attempt to correct a misperception."

The book received additional attention when, in 2012, Ian Peel discovered and released a previously unheard collaboration between Paul McCartney and Art of Noise issuing it on his compilation series for ZTT Records, The Art of the 12".

On the occasion of the artist's 80th birthday, Liverpool University Press praised the book's "description of McCartney's profound engagement with ambient music."

And on the release of The Beatles' Now and Then, The Telegraph quoted the book in its appraisal of the group's last remaining unreleased work, Carnival of Light.

== Bibliography ==
As author:

- Music & The Internet, Future plc, 1996
- The Unknown Paul McCartney – McCartney and the Avant-garde, with foreword by David Toop, Reynolds & Hearn/Titan Books, 2002
- The Rough Guide to eBay, Penguin Random House, 2006
- The Rough Guide to Saving & Selling Online (Penguin Random House, 2010)

As contributor:

- Is That The 12" Remix? (afterword), Bank House, 2016
- The Virgin Encyclopedia Of Popular Music, Virgin Books, 2002
- The New Grove Dictionary of Music and Musicians, Oxford University Press, 2001
- The Rough Guide To Rock, Penguin Random House, 1998
- The Complete Introduction to Record Collecting, Verulam Publishing, 1995
- Microsoft Music Central, Microsoft, 1995
- Guinness Encyclopedia Of Popular Music, Guinness Publishing, 1992

== Liner notes discography ==
- Propaganda - A Secret Sense of Rhythm : A Secret Sense of Sin (box set, 2025)
- Landscape - Landscape-a-Go-Go (box set, 2023)
- Landscape - From the Tea-rooms of Mars .... (Record Store Day 2023 Edition) (2023)
- The Psychedelic Furs - The Best Of (2021)
- Art of Noise - Noise in the City (Live in Tokyo, 1986) (2021)
- Art of Noise - Who's Afraid of the Art of Noise? (Record Store Day special edition) (2021)
- Art of Noise/Art & ACT - Daft as a Brush! (2019)
- Propaganda - The Eight Testaments of Propaganda (2019)
- 808 State - The Four States of 808 (2019)
- Art of Noise - In No Sense? Nonsense! (Deluxe Edition) (2018)
- Frankie Goes to Hollywood - The First 48 Inches of Frankie Goes to Hollywood (2018)
- Propaganda - A Secret Wish (Art of the Album Edition) (2017)
- Frankie Goes to Hollywood - Welcome to the Pleasuredome (Art of the Album Edition) (2017)
- Trevor Horn - The Reflection (2017)
- Anne Dudley - Anne Dudley Plays the Art of Noise (2017)
- Art of Noise - In Visible Silence (Deluxe Edition) (2017)
- Thompson Twins - Hold Me Now, The Very Best of Thompson Twins (2016)
- Various Artists - The Value of Entertainment (2015)
- Anne Pigalle - Everything Could Be So Perfect, Édition Deluxe (2015)
- Act - Love & Hate, A Compact Introduction to Act (2015)
- Art of Noise - At the End of a Century (2015)
- Lisa Stansfield - The Moment (2015)
- Various Artists - Rewind, The 80s Album (2014)
- Frankie Goes to Hollywood - Inside the Pleasuredome box set (2014)
- Various Artists - The Art of the 12", Volume Three: A Soundtrack for Living (2014)
- Various Artists - The Re-Organization of Pop box set (2014)
- Various Artists - Zambient One (2013)
- Various Artists - The Organization of Pop (2013)
- Frankie Goes to Hollywood - Frankie Said (2012)
- Frankie Goes to Hollywood - Sexmix, Archive Tapes and Studio Adventures (2012)
- Various Artists - The Art of the 12", Volume Two: A Promotion of a Way of Life (2012)
- Propaganda - Noise and Girls Come Out to Play, A Compact Introduction to Propaganda (2012)
- Propaganda - Wishful Thinking (Is Disturbdances Of Five Songs) (2012)
- Art of Noise - Who's Afraid of the Art of Noise? (25th anniversary edition) (2011)
- Various Artists - The Art of the 12", Volume One: A Celebration of the Extended Remix (2011)
- Art of Noise - Into Battle with the Art of Noise (25th anniversary edition) (2011)
- Paul Rutherford - Oh World (2011)
- Claudia Brücken - ComBined (2011)
- Frankie Goes to Hollywood - Liverpool (2011)
- 808 State - Blueprint (2011)
- Shades of Rhythm - Shades Of Rhythm, Extacy Edition (2010)
- Claudia Brücken - Love: And A Million Other Things (2010)
- Frankie Goes to Hollywood - Welcome to the Pleasuredome (2010)
- Art of Noise - Influence (2010)
- Buggles - Adventures in Modern Recording, 2.0 (2010)
- Propaganda - A Secret Wish (2010)
- 808 State - Don Solaris, 808 Archives Vol. 4 (2008)
- 808 State - Gorgeous, 808 Archives Vol. 3 (2008)
- 808 State - ex:el, 808 Archives Vol. 2 (ZTT, 2008)
- 808 State - 808:90, 808 Archives Vol. 1 (ZTT, 2008)
- Various Artists - Zang Tumb Tuum, The ZTT Box Set (2008)
- Various Artists - The Big Stiff Box Set (2007)
- Art of Noise - And What Have You Done with My Body, God? box set (2006)
- Andrew Poppy - On Zang Tuum Tumb box set (2005)
- Various Artists - The Abduction of the Art of Noise (2004)
