= In Visible Silence =

1986 studio album by Art of Noise

Studio album by Art of Noise
- Released: 14 April 1986
- Recorded: 1985–1986
- Genre: Synth-pop
- Length: 45:04
- Labels: China; Chrysalis
- Producers: Anne Dudley; Gary Langan; J. J. Jeczalik

Art of Noise chronology
Daft (1985)	In Visible Silence (1986)	In No Sense? Nonsense! (1987)

Singles from In Visible Silence
- 1. "Legs" Released: 1985; 2. "Peter Gunn" Released: 1986

Professional ratings
Review scores
Source	Rating
AllMusic	3/5 stars
The Village Voice	A−
Pitchfork	8.6/10

In Visible Silence is the second studio album by the English avant-garde synth-pop group Art of Noise in April 1986, and the first created by members Anne Dudley, J. J. Jeczalik and Gary Langan in the wake of their departure from ZTT Records that had been the home of the group's genesis.

The first single, "Legs", was released in late 1985, followed by two major hits on the UK Singles Chart in 1986: "Peter Gunn", that featured guitar legend Duane Eddy; and "Paranoimia" with television personality Max Headroom, where actor Matt Frewer performed two different monologues as Headroom for each of the 7" and 12" versions.

"Legacy", a re-worked version of "Legs" released as a single in late 1986, was taken from a special limited edition bonus album, Re-works of Art of Noise. A live version of the album was recorded in Hammersmith, London and released on VHS and 12-inch CD Video in 1987.

== Track listing ==
All tracks are written by Anne Dudley, Gary Langan, J.J. Jeczalik, apart from tracks 8 and 12 which were written by Henry Mancini. Lyrics from track 1 are adapted from "No!" by Thomas Hood (1844).

No.	Title	Length
1.	"Opus 4"	1:59
2.	"Paranoimia"	4:46
3.	"Eye of a Needle"	4:25
4.	"Legs"	4:06
5.	"Slip of the Tongue"	1:30
6.	"Backbeat"	4:12
7.	"Instruments of Darkness"	7:12
8.	"Peter Gunn" (featuring Duane Eddy)	3:55
9.	"Camilla: The Old, Old Story"	7:23
10.	"The Chameleon's Dish"	4:17
11.	"Beatback"	1:19
Total length:		45:04

Some versions of the album released after the success of the single "Paranoimia" supplement the album version with the single version, or include both versions.

CD bonus track
No.	Title	Length
12.	"Peter Gunn" (Extended Version, featuring Duane Eddy)	6:01
Total length:		51:05

The 1988 CD re-release included "The Twang Mix" of the above track in its stead.

=== 2017 deluxe edition ===
A deluxe edition of the album was released on 19 May 2017, featuring a number of bonus tracks which had not been available commercially before.

CD 1
No.	Title	Original release	Length
12.	"Paranoimia" (7" Mix, featuring Max Headroom)	"Paranoimia" single, 1986	3:18
13.	"Legs" (7" Mix)	"Legs" single, 1985	3:30
14.	"Hoops and Mallets"	"Legs" single, 1985	3:42
15.	"Something Always Happens"	"Peter Gunn" single, 1986	2:36
16.	"Why Me?"	"Paranoimia" single, 1986	2:56
17.	"A Nation Rejects"	"Paranoimia" single, 1986	2:56
18.	"Backbeat" (Reprise)		4:00
Total length:			68:02

CD 2
No.	Title	Length
1.	"World War II"	1:26
2.	"The First Leg"	3:18
3.	"Happy Harry's High Club"	0:56
4.	"Chameleon 4"	1:19
5.	"Beddoo-Bedoo"	3:20
6.	"Panic"	2:44
7.	"Camel"	4:24
8.	"Second Legs"	2:28
9.	"Trumpton Boogie"	4:28
10.	"Chameleon 1"	1:02
11.	"A Nation Regrets"	3:00
12.	"Legs" (Inside Leg Mix)	6:01
13.	"Legs" (Last Leg Mix)	4:46
14.	"Peter Gunn" (Extended Version, featuring Duane Eddy)	6:01
15.	"Peter Gunn" (The Twang Mix, featuring Duane Eddy)	7:30
16.	"Paranoimia" (Extended Version, featuring Max Headroom)	6:42
17.	"Paranoimia" (The Paranoid Mix, featuring Max Headroom)	9:37
Total length:		69:02

== Charts ==
=== Weekly charts ===
1986 weekly chart performance for In Visible Silence
Chart (1986)	Peak position
Australian Albums (Kent Music Report)	55
Austrian Albums (Ö3 Austria)	11
Canada Top Albums/CDs (RPM)	16
Dutch Albums (Album Top 100)	18
European Albums (Music & Media)	35
German Albums (Offizielle Top 100)	41
New Zealand Albums (RMNZ)	27
Swiss Albums (Schweizer Hitparade)	22
UK Albums (Official Charts)	18
US Billboard 200	53
US Top R&B/Hip-Hop Albums (Billboard)	49

2017 weekly chart performance for In Visible Silence
Chart (2017)	Peak position
Belgian Albums (Ultratop Flanders)	131

=== Year-end charts ===
Year-end chart performance for In Visible Silence
Chart (1986)	Position
Dutch Albums (Album Top 100)	69
