= Into Battle with the Art of Noise =

1983 EP by Art of Noise

EP by Art of Noise
- Released: 26 September 1983
- Recorded: February–August 1983
- Genres: Electro, synthpop, art pop, sound collage
- Length: 23:26 (original UK vinyl)
- Labels: ZTT (UK); Island (USA); Salvo (reissue)
- Producer: Art of Noise

Art of Noise chronology
Into Battle with the Art of Noise (1983)	Who's Afraid of the Art of Noise? (1984)

Into Battle with the Art of Noise is a 1983 EP by Art of Noise—its first release, and also the first release by ZTT Records. The record represented the first installment in ZTT's Incidental Series (catalogue number ZTIS 100).

Into Battle constructed tracks using early sampling techniques centred on the Fairlight CMI workstation, which at the time was state-of-the-art technology. Two songs from the EP, "Beat Box" and "Moments in Love", were subsequently featured on the group's first LP, Who's Afraid of the Art of Noise?, in altered form.

== Reissues ==
In 1986, portions of Into Battle, Who's Afraid, and the "Moments in Love" 12-inch single were combined to form the Daft compilation.

In 2003, the original Into Battle EP was issued on CD for the first time in Germany, but the release included "Beat Box (Diversion One)", as on Who's Afraid, rather than the original EP mix.

Into Battle appeared in full on disc four of the 2006 Art of Noise box set And What Have You Done with My Body, God?, which was conceived, researched and compiled by Ian Peel. This set restored the original version of "Beat Box" and included the 5:10 edit of "Moments in Love" from the cassette issue of the EP, neither of which had been officially released on CD before.

In April 2011, ZTT released a deluxe edition of Into Battle, again compiled by Peel. In addition to a wide CD release, a limited edition of 500 copies on blue vinyl was released for Record Store Day. This edition again featured the tracks of the original UK cassette and appended Worship, an early version of Who's Afraid with different track order, extra tracks and alternate mixes.

== Cover art ==
The artwork depicted on the original EP sleeve is based on that of The Dave Brubeck Quartet's "Time Further Out" (1961), and incorporates a section of the panel "The Knights of Christ" from Jan van Eyck's Ghent Altarpiece.

== Reception and legacy ==
Professional ratings
Review scores
Source	Rating
Allmusic	3/5 stars

Writing retrospectively for Allmusic, Ned Raggett reviewed the EP positively, saying, "One listen to Into Battle With the Art of Noise and some of [the band's] influences in industrial, hip-hop, techno, and pop become clearer."

The EP's title and elements of its visual and musical style were parodied by the group Mainframe with their 1984 12-inch single, "Into Trouble with the Noise of Art".

== Formats and track listings ==
=== 12″ vinyl ===
Side 1
No.	Title	Length
1.	"Battle"	0:25
2.	"Beat Box"	4:48
3.	"The Army Now"	2:02
4.	"Donna"	1:44

Side 2
No.	Title	Length
1.	"Moments in Love"	10:15
2.	"Bright Noise"	0:05
3.	"Flesh in Armour"	1:24
4.	"Comes and Goes"	1:18
5.	"Moment in Love"	1:25

=== UK cassette ===
Side 1
No.	Title	Length
1.	"Battle"	0:25
2.	"Beat Box"	4:48
3.	"The Army Now"	2:02
4.	"Donna"	1:44

Side 2
No.	Title	Length
1.	"Moments in Love"	5:08
2.	"Bright Noise"	0:05
3.	"Flesh in Armour"	1:24
4.	"Comes and Goes"	1:18
5.	"Moment in Love"	1:25

=== US cassette ===
Side 1
No.	Title	Length
1.	"Battle"	0:25
2.	"Beat Box"	4:48
3.	"The Army Now"	2:02
4.	"Donna"	1:44
5.	"Beat Box" (repeat of track 2)	4:48

Side 2
No.	Title	Length
1.	"Bright Noise"	0:05
2.	"Flesh in Armour"	1:24
3.	"Comes and Goes"	1:18
4.	"Moments in Love"	10:15

=== 2011 reissue ===
Into Battle with the Art of Noise
No.	Title	Length
1.	"Battle"	0:25
2.	"Beat Box"	4:48
3.	"The Army Now"	2:02
4.	"Donna"	1:44
5.	"Moments in Love"	5:08
6.	"Bright Noise"	0:05
7.	"Flesh in Armour"	1:24
8.	"Comes and Goes"	1:18
9.	"Moment in Love"	1:25

Worship
No.	Title	Length
10.	"Who's Afraid of the Art of Noise" (a.k.a. "How to Kill")	2:32
11.	"One Finger of Love"	0:29
12.	"Diversions 1" (a.k.a. "Beat Box (Diversion One)")	7:48
13.	"Two Fingers of Love"	0:58
14.	"The Uncertainty of Syrup" (early version of "Realisation")	1:22
15.	"Damn It All!"	1:45
16.	"Three Fingers of Love"	0:42
17.	"Sign of Relief" (extended version of "Snapshot")	1:28
18.	"Hands off Love"	2:56
19.	"Diversions 5" (a.k.a. "Beat Box (Diversion Five)")	3:44
20.	"Goodbye, Art of Noise"	0:37
21.	"Confession"	0:52
22.	"Close (To the Edit)"	4:03
23.	"Diversions 3" (a.k.a. "Beat Box (Diversion Three)")	3:41
24.	"The Movement of Desire" ("A Time For Fear (Who's Afraid?)" minus the final section)	3:30
25.	"And What Have You Done with My Body, God?" (extended version of "Memento")	4:41
26.	"The Wounds of Wonder" (a.k.a. "Who's Afraid (of the Art of Noise)")	4:18
27.	"A Time for Fear (Who's Afraid?)" (early mix, without overlaid voice samples and with an alternate outro)	4:43

== Personnel and samples ==
Credits adapted from Into Battle with the Art of Noise liner notes.

- All tracks written by Anne Dudley, Trevor Horn, J.J. Jeczalik, Gary Langan and Paul Morley
- "Beat Box":
  - Sampled drums by Alan White of Yes
  - Contains a sample of "Kool is Back" as performed by Funk, Inc.
  - Contains a vocal sample of "Jingle Bells" as performed by Frank Sinatra
  - Contains a vocal sample of "Soweto" as performed by Malcolm McLaren
- "The Army Now": Contains a vocal sample of "Boogie Woogie Bugle Boy" as performed by The Andrews Sisters
- "Donna": Contains a sample of "State of Independence" as performed by Donna Summer
- "Moments in Love" and "Close (To the Edit)": Vocals by Camilla Pilkington
- "And What Have You Done with My Body, God?": Contains an interpolation of the St Matthew Passion, composed by Johann Sebastian Bach

== Charts ==
Chart performance for Into Battle with the Art of Noise
Chart (1984)	Peak position
US Top R&B/Hip-Hop Albums (Billboard)	21
