= Siphiwo Ntshebe =

South African operatic tenor

Siphiwo Desmond Ntshebe (1975/1976 – 25 May 2010) was a South African tenor opera singer. Former president of South Africa Nelson Mandela selected Ntshebe to perform at the opening ceremony for the 2010 FIFA World Cup in Johannesburg.

Ntshebe died of acute bacterial meningitis on 25 May 2010 at Livingstone Hospital in Port Elizabeth, days before he was due to perform at the opening ceremonies on 11 June 2010. Keith Lister, chief executive of Sony Music Entertainment, the parent of Ntshebe's record label, described his death as "a sad, tragic story". Timothy Moloi sang the song "Hope" in his place.

== Biography ==
Ntshebe was born and lived in the South African seaside city of Port Elizabeth, in the New Brighton township. He was a premature baby and his name, Siphiwo, means "gift". New Brighton was home to violence and political resistance to apartheid while Ntshebe was growing up. When he was six his parents sent him to stay with his grandparents in the Transkei, for three years.

His father Lumkile "Wilmot" Ntshebe was an industrial glazier who died in an industrial accident on 27 November 2001, whilst Siphiwo was studying at university, leaving Siphiwo as head of the family and breadwinner. His mother, Nowezile Lulama "Patience" Ntshebe, works as a housekeeper and he has three siblings, sister Nobulumko "Michelle" Ntshebe, and two brothers, Nceba "Christopher" Ntshebe and Mzingisi "Bennett" Ntshebe.

== Music ==
Ntshebe was first exposed to classical music and opera music as a child. His mother used to take him to work with her cleaning houses. Ntshebe began singing in the church choir where his grandfather was a Methodist preacher. Ntshebe was scouted at 16 at the Port Elizabeth Opera House when he sang in his first Italian opera, Il trovatore by Verdi. Ntshebe was a member of the Port Elizabeth Viola Men's Chorus, an opera group based in Zwide.

He was offered a scholarship study in the choral program at the University of Cape Town. Ntshebe was selected for Opera Queensland's Young Artists Programme in Brisbane, Australia, and was endorsed by Pallo Jordan, the then South African Minister for Arts and Culture. Ntshebe also received a scholarship for the Royal College of Music from 2004 to 2007. Ntshebe has performed for Archbishop Desmond Tutu, Queen Elizabeth II, Prince Philip, Prince Charles and Prince Albert of Monaco.

His repertoire included Beethoven's Fidelio, Bizet's Carmen, Mozart's operas, Puccini, Rossini and Verdi among others. He lived in London and returned to South Africa to perform at the World Cup. His album Hope was released posthumously in June 2010. Nelson Mandela appears on the album, speaking the words: "The generosity of the human spirit can overcome all adversity. Through compassion and caring we can create hope. We can create hope."

The album also featured a sample of Pavarotti's "Nessun dorma" which was the opening soundtrack to the 1990 World Cup in Italy. Other tracks on the album include "The Drinking Song", "Ave Maria", "Abide with Me", "Something Inside So Strong", "A te, o cara" from I puritani, "Nkosi Sikelel' iAfrika" and "You'll Never Walk Alone".

Ntshebe died in Livingstone Hospital in Port Elizabeth, aged 34, and is buried at the Forest Hill Cemetery there. He is survived by his three children, his mother, two brothers and a sister.
