= Dragnet (theme music) =

Theme music for the radio and television show Dragnet

- Label from original 78 rpm

Single by Ray Anthony and his Orchestra
- B-side: "Dancing in the Dark"
- Released: 1953
- Genre: Theme song; instrumental; big band
- Length: 2:50
- Label: Capitol
- Songwriter(s): Walter Schumann

"Dragnet" is an instrumental theme from the radio and television show of the same name. It was composed by Walter Schumann for the radio show, and was also used on the subsequent television series and later syndication of the TV series under the name "Badge 714". The theme is in two parts: an opening signature "Main Title" ("Dum - - - de - DUM - DUM") and the "Dragnet March" used over the end credits.

Popular chart hit versions were recorded by Ray Anthony and his Orchestra (1953) and The Art of Noise (1987).

Film and television composer Nathan Scott, who began orchestrating for Schumann beginning in 1952, later became Dragnet's second composer following Schumann's departure from the series.

== Authorship dispute ==
After the theme became a chart hit, the publishers of the score for the 1946 film version of The Killers composed by Miklós Rózsa challenged the authorship of the copyright of the Dragnet "Main Title". They contended that Walter Schumann had visited the sound stage in 1946 when Miklós Rózsa was recording "The Killers", and had reused the melody of a cue for that film known as "Danger Ahead". A settlement between publishers resolved the case by allowing both composers and publishers to share the royalties for the short opening signature "Main Title", which became known as "Danger Ahead" after that. The "Dragnet March" remained the exclusive composition of Schumann. The first four notes of the theme, along with their rhythmic profile, appear in the Prelude to Act IV of the opera Les vêpres siciliennes by Giuseppe Verdi.

== Ray Anthony version ==
The 1953 recording by Ray Anthony and his Orchestra sold over 500,000 copies in the US and rocketed Ray Anthony to popularity. It was available as both a 45 rpm 7-inch vinyl record and a 78 rpm 10-inch shellac record. It reached number three on the Billboard Best Selling Singles chart and spent two weeks in the UK chart (December 10, 1953 and January 14, 1954), peaking at number seven.

== The Art of Noise version ==
"Dragnet"
- UK single picture sleeve

Single by The Art of Noise

from the album In No Sense? Nonsense!
- B-side: "Acton Art"
- Released: July 6, 1987
- Recorded: 1987
- Genre: Theme song; instrumental; dance
- Length: 2:59
- Label: China
- Songwriter(s): Walter Schumann
- Producer(s): Anne Dudley, J. J. Jeczalik

The Art of Noise singles chronology
"Legacy" (1986)	"Dragnet" (1987)	"Dragnet The '88 Mix" (1988)

The 1987 version by The Art of Noise was an international hit, and won the 1987 Grammy Award for Best Rock Instrumental Performance. It was used as the theme music for the 1987 film version of Dragnet based on the TV show.

A new version was released the following year, "Dragnet (The '88 Mix)".

=== Reception ===
Evan Cater for AllMusic describes the 12-inch single as "a catchy mesh of orchestral samples, synthesized noise and clips of dialogue from the film."

=== Chart performance ===
The Art of Noise version reached number 60 in the UK, number 84 in the Netherlands, number 25 in New Zealand and number 29 in Switzerland. "Dragnet (The '88 Mix)" reached number 90 in the UK.

=== Influence of the composition on Johnny "Guitar" Watson's Space Guitar ===
‘’Space Guitar’’ is an instrumental composed and recorded by American rhythm and blues artist Johnny "Guitar" Watson, released as a single in 1954. The piece uses a stop-time arrangement, when the other musicians drop out during breaks. During these, Watson plays various guitar figures, including the introduction from the Dragnet theme music, before the accompaniment resumes.
