= Paranoimia =

1986 single by Art of Noise

Single by Art of Noise featuring Max Headroom

from the album In Visible Silence (original version) and Re-Works of Art of Noise (single version)
- B-side: "Why Me?"
- Released: April 1986
- Length: 4:46 (album version); 3:18 (single version); 6:42 (extended version)
- Label: China
- Songwriters: Anne Dudley; Gary Langan; J. J. Jeczalik
- Producers: Anne Dudley; Gary Langan; J. J. Jeczalik

Art of Noise singles chronology
"Peter Gunn" (1986)	"Paranoimia" (1986)	"Legacy" (1986)

Music video
- "Paranoimia" on YouTube

"Paranoimia" is a song by the English avant-garde synth-pop group Art of Noise, released in April 1986 by China Records from their second studio album, In Visible Silence (1986). A better-known version was released as a single, featuring the fictional character Max Headroom (played by the American-Canadian actor Matt Frewer) on vocals. This version was first included on the 1986 album Re-Works of Art of Noise.

The 7-inch single features a monologue about Max Headroom being scared and unable to sleep (hence "Paranoimia", a portmanteau of "paranoia" and "insomnia"). The 12-inch has a completely different vocal with Headroom as a master of ceremonies, talking about the music and making a pun-laden introduction of the alleged band members: English actor Peter O'Toole on trumpet (the absence of a trumpet in the song explained by O'Toole, notorious at one time for his drinking, "just having a rest between bars"), Czech-American tennis player Martina Navratilova on bassline (baseline), American singer Cher on mic ("Are you OK, Mike?"), and the Pope on drums.

== Track listing ==
The 12-inch single was also available on a one-sided cassette tape with the following track listing:

1. "Paranoimia" (extended version) – 6:40
2. "Paranoimia" (7-inch version) – 3:18
3. "Why Me?" – 2:56
4. "A Nation Rejects" – 2:57

Some later issues of the CD In Visible Silence, most notably the US version, include the single version in place of the original version, which did not include the Max Headroom vocals.

== Charts ==
=== Weekly charts ===
Chart (1986)	Peak position
Australia (Kent Music Report)	52
Belgium (Ultratop 50 Flanders)	17
Canada Top Singles (RPM)	31
Europe (European Hot 100 Singles)	19
Ireland (IRMA)	18
Luxembourg (Radio Luxembourg)	7
Netherlands (Dutch Top 40)	11
Netherlands (Single Top 100)	7
New Zealand (Recorded Music NZ)	6
South Africa (Springbok Radio)	10
UK Singles (Official Charts)	12
US Billboard Hot 100	34
US 12-inch Singles Sales (Billboard) Remix	21
US Dance/Disco Club Play (Billboard) Remix	14
West Germany (GfK)	33

=== Year-end charts ===
Chart (1986)	Position
Netherlands (Dutch Top 40)	92
Netherlands (Single Top 100)	60

== "Paranoimia '89" ==
In 1989, a remix by the Dutch dance music DJ Ben Liebrand was released with a new music video to promote The Best of The Art of Noise.
