= Below the Waste =

Studio album by Art of Noise
- Released: 11 September 1989
- Recorded: 1988–1989
- Studios: AIR, CBS Studios, Mayfair Studios (London), Studio Marcadet (Paris), AIR (Montserrat)
- Genres: Experimental, synthpop
- Length: 51:47
- Labels: China; Polydor
- Producers: Anne Dudley; J. J. Jeczalik; Ted Hayton

Art of Noise chronology
In No Sense? Nonsense! (1987)	Below the Waste (1989)	The Seduction of Claude Debussy (1999)

Professional ratings
Review scores
Source	Rating
Allmusic	1.5/5 stars
Hi-Fi News & Record Review	A*:1/2

Below the Waste is Art of Noise's fourth full-length original album and their last album for China Records before Anne Dudley re-formed the group with ZTT's Trevor Horn and Paul Morley for 1999's The Seduction of Claude Debussy.

The album saw the group experimenting with world music, collaborating with South African Zulu group Mahlathini and the Mahotella Queens, who provide a heavy layer of mostly non-English-language vocals on three tracks ("Yebo!", "Chain Gang" and "Spit"). The album was produced by Anne Dudley, Ted Hayton and J.J. Jeczalik.

The album represents the diverging interests of the two remaining members of the original group, Anne Dudley and J.J. Jeczalik. Dudley's influence is evident in the album's ambient interludes of melodic, orchestral pieces, while Jeczalik's influence can be heard in the album's dub tracks and harder, rock-edged pieces. The latter songs also feature arrangements more typical of the band's earlier material, utilising sampling techniques, lengthy fade-outs, a diverse mixture of classical instruments, guitar riffs and percussion typical of industrial music.

Like its predecessor, In No Sense? Nonsense!, the album also features cover versions of previously recorded themes composed for television and film, namely "Robinson Crusoe" (originally the theme to the 1964 television programme The Adventures of Robinson Crusoe) and "James Bond Theme" which was submitted for the soundtrack of the 1989 James Bond film Licence to Kill and subsequently rejected by the film's producers..

The "Emphasis Speakers" on the album cover were designed by Morten Villiers Warren for B&W. The orchestra was led by John Bradbury.

Although the album was praised for its collaboration with Mahlathini and the Mahotella Queens, the reviews for the album were mostly negative, with Allmusic music reviewer Dean Carlson calling the album a "misfire" and compared it to "world mall-music".

== Samples ==
Spit contains a sample of "Con le Mani" by Zucchero Fornaciari at the beginning of the song.

== Track listing ==
1. "Dan Dare" (Anne Dudley, J.J. Jeczalik) – 6:01
2. "Yebo!" (Dudley, Jeczalik, West Nkosi) – 7:11
3. "Catwalk" (Dudley, Jeczalik, Ted Hayton) – 5:29
4. "Promenade 1" (Dudley) – 0:32
5. "Dilemma" (Jeczalik, Hayton) – 3:00
6. "Island" (Dudley, Jeczalik) – 5:49
7. "Chain Gang" (Jeczalik, Nkosi) – 3:07
8. "Promenade 2" (Dudley) – 0:38
9. "Back to Back" (Jeczalik) – 3:53
10. "Flashback" (Dudley) – 1:45
11. "Spit" (Dudley, Jeczalik) – 3:31
12. "Robinson Crusoe" (Gian Piero Reverberi, Robert Mellin, Georges Van Parys) – 3:47
13. "James Bond Theme" (Monty Norman) – 5:18
14. "Finale" (Dudley) – 2:38

LP releases exclude tracks 12 and 13; initial US CD and cassette releases categorize these songs as bonus tracks.

== Personnel ==
- Anne Dudley, Frank Ricotti, Hilda Tloubatla, J.J. Jeczalik, Keith Beauvais, Luis Jardim, Mildred Mangxola, Nobesuthu Mbadu, Simon Mahlathini Nkabinde, Simon Morton, Ted Hayton, West Nkosi
- Mahlathini and the Mahotella Queens – vocals on "Yebo!", "Chain Gang" and "Spit"
- John Bradbury – orchestra leader
