= Art of Noise =

British avant-garde synth-pop group

- Dudley, Morley, Creme and Horn (from the fourth and final Art of Noise line-up in 1998–2000)

Background information
- Also known as: The Image of a Group; Vision
- Origin: London, England
- Genres: Synth-rock; electronic rock; avant-garde; new wave; sampledelia
- Works: Art of Noise discography
- Years active: 1983–1990; 1998–2000; 2017
- Labels: ZTT; Island; China; Chrysalis; Elektra; Modern; BMG; Polydor; Universal
- Past members: Anne Dudley; J. J. Jeczalik; Gary Langan; Trevor Horn; Paul Morley; Lol Creme
- Website: theartofnoiseonline.com

Art of Noise were a British avant-garde and electronic group formed in early 1983 by audio engineer and record producer Gary Langan and programmer J. J. Jeczalik, along with keyboardist and arranger Anne Dudley, producer Trevor Horn, and music journalist Paul Morley. The group had international Top 20 hits with its interpretations of "Kiss", featuring Tom Jones, and the instrumental "Peter Gunn", which won a 1986 Grammy Award.

The group's mostly instrumental compositions were novel melodic sound collages based on digital sampler technology, which was new at the time. Inspired by turn-of-the-20th-century revolutions in music, the Art of Noise were initially packaged as a faceless anti- or non-group, blurring the distinction between the art and its creators. The band is noted for innovative use of electronics and computers in pop music, particularly its innovative use of sampling.

== History ==
=== Beginnings ===
The technological impetus for the Art of Noise was the advent of the Fairlight CMI sampler. With the Fairlight, short digital sound recordings called samples could be played using a piano-like keyboard, while a computer processor altered such characteristics as pitch and timbre. Music producer Trevor Horn was among the early adopters of Fairlight. While some musicians were using samples as adornment in their works, Horn and his colleagues saw the potential to craft entire compositions with the sampler.

In 1981, Horn's production team included programmer J. J. Jeczalik, engineer Gary Langan and keyboard player/string arranger Anne Dudley. The team produced ABC's 1982 debut album The Lexicon of Love, increasingly using the Fairlight to tweak live-based elements of performance but also to embellish the compositions with sound effects such as a cash register's bell on "Date Stamp" (Dudley also co-wrote a track on the album, which launched her scoring career). The team also worked on Malcolm McLaren's 1982 album Duck Rock and would go on to work with Frankie Goes to Hollywood on what would become the album Welcome to the Pleasuredome (realised predominantly on Fairlight).

During January 1983, Horn's team were working on the Yes comeback album 90125 – Horn as producer, Langan as engineer, and Dudley and Jeczalik providing arrangements and keyboard programming. During the sessions, Jeczalik and Langan took a scrapped Alan White drum riff and sampled it into the Fairlight using the device's Page R sequencer (the first time an entire drum pattern had been sampled into the machine). Jeczalik and Langan then added non-musical sounds on top of it, before playing the track to Horn. This in turn resulted in the Red & Blue Mix of Yes's "Owner of a Lonely Heart" single, which showcased the prototype sound of The Art of Noise.

Seeing further potential in the idea, Horn teamed Jeczalik and Langan with Dudley in February to develop the project and brought in one of his business partners, ex-NME journalist Paul Morley, as a provider of concepts, art direction and marketing ideas. Morley came up with the project name (taken from the essay "The Art of Noises" by noted futurist Luigi Russolo, and finalised at Jeczalik's request by dropping the final 's'). Much later, in a July 2002 article penned for The Guardian, Morley wrote "I loved the name Art of Noise so much that I forced my way into the group. If over the years people asked me what I did in the group, I replied that I named them, and it was such a great name, that was enough to justify my role. I was the Ringo Starr of Art of Noise. I made the tea. Oh, and I wrote the lyrics to one of the loveliest pieces of pop music ever - Moments in Love." Horn himself joined the new group as production advisor and provider of further ideas. This was the first time that he had been part of a group since parting company with his The Buggles' partner Geoff Downes (after they had been part of Yes). It would also be the first and last time that he would enjoy chart success as an artist since the new wave hit in 1979 with "Video Killed the Radio Star" (not counting writing credits on The Dollar Album).

=== Who's Afraid of the Art of Noise? (1983–1984) ===
The debut Art of Noise EP, Into Battle with the Art of Noise, appeared in September 1983 on Horn's fledgling ZTT label. Many of the samples originally used on 90125 reappeared on the EP, which immediately scored a hit in the urban and alternative dance charts in the US with the highly percussive, cut-up instrumental track "Beat Box", a favourite among body-poppers.

The first Art of Noise album, Who's Afraid of the Art of Noise? was released in 1984. During this period, the group presented themselves as faceless (using masks, minimal personal appearances, or even absence from promotion to indicate that the Art of Noise was not a standard rock or pop band which promoted and mythologised its members as individuals).

Anne: When the group first started, we thought it would be a good idea to have an image that wasn't based around a fashion look. We thought it would encourage people to look at the music instead of the members of the band. It didn't last for long, though.

Gary: It really doesn't seem a lot different, actually; the responsibility a lot more different; it's probably more fun, more risk to it.

Anne: There's a very big risk in America because they think we're black; we were voted the second best new black act. We are wondering how we can quite cope with this.

Gary: There was at one point there came along an instrument that nobody had really used and we were lucky that we had one we could use. There are certain things you can do with it that you're not able to do with anything else. So it was a question of experimenting with that, and things really took off from there.

Anne: This is the famous Fairlight music computer, which you may have heard of.

Gary: Which plays an important part. I really think that the music is more important than the personality. The fashion around a personality seems to change a lot quicker than that around music.

— Gary Langan and Anne Dudley, BBC Breakfast Time interview

"Moments in Love", a ten-minute instrumental ode to sensuality that appeared on both Into Battle and Who's Afraid, was remixed and released as a single in 1985. The song was first released in the US in 1983, where it was a moderate hit on the US R&B singles chart. It was played at one of Madonna's weddings; sampled by Mýa in her hit single "It's All About Me," which featured Sisqó; used in the soundtrack of the movie Pumping Iron II: The Women; featured in the Indian movie Koi...Mil Gaya; name-dropped in the opening pages of Sister Souljah's 2011 novel Midnight and the Meaning of Love (as "Moments of Love"); interpolated in King Sun's song “Hey, Love”; used in a number of advertisements; and remixed, covered, and sampled by numerous other artists. It has also appeared in numerous chill out compilations and has become a staple of smooth jazz radio station playlists. "Moments in Love" has been remixed many times, with names such as "Moments in Bed" and "Moments in love 7" Master Rejected". Most "Moments in Love" remixes can be found in the box set And What Have You Done with My Body, God?

An October 1984 feature in Smash Hits magazine indicated several of Morley and Horn's plans for the group's subsequent projects. These included a cover of "Video Killed the Radio Star", originally by The Buggles (Horn and Geoff Downes); Raiding the 20th Century, an album using sounds from throughout the 20th century as source material; the score for The Living End, a film written by Morley and directed by Godley & Creme; and the soundtrack for a ballet.

"Close (to the Edit)" was issued in October that year. The single was Art of Noise's first major UK hit, reaching number eight in the UK Singles Chart in November 1984.

=== Split of original line-up (1985) ===
In 1985, Dudley, Jeczalik, and Langan made an acrimonious split from Morley and Horn as well as from the ZTT label.

In a post-split interview for Melody Maker in October 1985, Jeczalik indicated that he and Morley did not get along and that he felt Morley's writing was pretentious. Jeczalik responded to a question about the level of Morley and Horn's involvement in Who's Afraid by saying, "It's difficult to tell. We say approximately 1.73 percent, but it could even be as high as two percent. You see, all that has happened is that Gary and I started something, it was taken away, and we have taken steps to get it back." In the same interview, Dudley indicated she felt parts of Who's Afraid were of dubious quality.

Much later, Morley would comment "When Trevor and I left, (Jeczalik, Langan and Dudley) became a novelty group who had hits with Tom Jones." His disdain for the artistic direction of The Art of Noise once he was no longer involved with it was even more evident in other articles he penned, including the liner notes of the 1986 compilation album Daft (under the name Otto Flake) and a September 2002 article for The Observer.

=== In Visible Silence (1986) ===
The Art of Noise "Peter Gunn" (1986)
21 seconds of "Peter Gunn" by the Art of Noise and Duane Eddy

After the split, Dudley, Jeczalik, and Langan moved to the UK-based China Records label, taking the Art of Noise name with them. Some of the band's original imagery and ethos was retained for their second album, In Visible Silence. This album spawned the Grammy Award-winning cover of the Peter Gunn theme, recorded with Duane Eddy, who had a hit with Peter Gunn in 1959. The Art of Noise collaboration reached number two on the Billboard dance charts. The Peter Gunn video featured comedian Rik Mayall in a parody of the private eye film genre. The piece would later be used as the theme music for the 2008 BBC TV series Bill Oddie's Wild Side.

From the same album, the "Beat Box"-like single "Legs" (using the same drum sounds) was a mild underground hit in dance clubs. In 1986, the album track "Paranoimia" achieved some success when a remix of it was released as a single with overdubbed vocal samples provided by Matt Frewer as the supposedly computer-generated character Max Headroom. Frewer also appeared as Max Headroom in the music video for the track.

Around 1986, Jeczalik and Dudley started appearing in photographs without masks, alienating some fans that had come to appreciate Morley's "art for art's sake" aesthetic. The upcoming soundtrack pieces continued The Art of Noise's evolution into a pop band and away from Morley's faceless "non-group."

=== In No Sense? Nonsense!, Below the Waste, and the split (1987–1990) ===
From Hammersmith to Tokyo and Back (Live) excerpt
An excerpt from From Hammersmith to Tokyo and Back (Live).

By 1987, the band's membership was down to just Jeczalik and Dudley. That year saw the release of their album In No Sense? Nonsense! The album featured Jeczalik's most advanced rhythmic collages to date, plus lush string arrangements, pieces for boys' choir, and keyboard melodies from Dudley. It did not produce any hits, although their record label made efforts to push remixes of "Dragnet" into the dance clubs and the single reached No. 60 on the UK Singles Chart.

In 1987, The Art of Noise provided the score for two movies, Hiding Out and Dragnet, and one particular movement was used in both films. Their brass-based connecting passage between sections from the original Dragnet television show's theme song was used as incidental music during a dramatic scene—an armed chase through the rafters of a gymnasium—near the end of Hiding Out.

In 1988, a one-off collaboration with singer Tom Jones (a cover of Prince's "Kiss" – a staple in Jones' stage shows) renewed the public's interest in the Art of Noise and provided the group's biggest hit in the mainstream. The track appeared on several albums by Jones, and China Records included the song on the greatest hits compilation The Best of The Art of Noise, the first edition of which also contained tracks licensed from ZTT.

The follow-up album, Below the Waste, failed to achieve much success upon its release in 1989. It did spawn the memorable single "Yebo!" (featuring the unique vocals of Zulu performers Mahlathini and the Mahotella Queens). Both cassette and CD versions include two bonus tracks in the form of "Robinson Crusoe", and the "James Bond Theme".

In 1990, Dudley and Jeczalik declared that the Art of Noise had officially disbanded.

=== Interim (compilations, failed reformations and solo work) ===
Although Dudley and Jeczalik had already dissolved the group, in 1990 they assisted in the promotion of the lightly remixed compilation The Ambient Collection, which the China label released to cash in on the burgeoning ambient house scene. Jeczalik approved the remixes that appeared on The FON Mixes the following year. The rest of the decade saw China Records releasing further Art of Noise compilations: The Drum and Bass Collection, Art Works, and reissues of Best of without the ZTT-era tracks. Some of these featured new remixes by other artists.

According to an interview with J.J. Jeczalik reported in the ZTT fanzine Outside World in 1991, Jeczalik, Dudley and Langan were inspired by the commercial success of The FON Mixes and had discussed reuniting the group as a trio again. In preparation to record a new album, Jeczalik and Langan travelled to Cuba to gather new source material. However, no new recordings were produced with the new line-up, and the Art of Noise remained defunct.

Dudley became well known for composing numerous film and television scores during the 1990s. The most famous of these is probably The Full Monty, which won an Academy Award for Original Music Score. She also collaborated with Killing Joke's Jaz Coleman on the 1990 album Songs from the Victorious City (inspired by a trip the two made to Egypt) and produced two tracks for the 1993 Deborah Harry album Debravation ("Strike Me Pink", which she also co-wrote and played keyboards on, and "Mood Ring"). She has scored orchestrations for dozens of pop releases over the years, and both scored and produced the album Voice for her neighbour Alison Moyet. Cathy Dennis added lyrics to one of Dudley's compositions and recorded it as "Too Many Walls", which became a US Top 10 hit in 1991.

In 1995–1997, Jeczalik and In No Sense? Nonsense! coengineer Bob Kraushaar produced a number of instrumentals oriented toward dance clubs under the name Art of Silence, issuing an album titled artofsilence.co.uk. Jeczalik also embarked on a new career in trading in futures contracts.

The Art of Noise also received a full writing credit for The Prodigy's "Firestarter", which samples the female "hey, hey" voice from "Close to the Edit". The Prodigy also contributed the remix "Instruments of Darkness (All of Us are One People)" to the 1991 compilation The FON Mixes. Also, an edited version of "Close to the Edit" is featured on the monthly educational Amiga game Ready Robot Club. The Art of Noise are also credited for the music to the ITV series The Krypton Factor.

=== The reunion and The Seduction of Claude Debussy (1998–2000) ===
In 1998, Horn, Morley, and Dudley began talking about the original intent of the project, its relevance in 20th-century music, and the impending turn of a new century. The group temporarily reformed, adding guitarist Lol Creme, but without J.J. Jeczalik and Gary Langan. Their engineering, programming and production tasks were carried out by dance act Way Out West. An album was recorded – Balance – Music for the Eye – but was never released as an album, although several tracks from this project were included on the 2010 retrospective album Influence and all the tracks were released as part of the At the End of the Century box set. Instead, a new single called "Dream On" – which featured remixed versions of the forthcoming album track "Dreaming in Colour" – was released to club DJs later in 1998, showcasing mixes by Way Out West.

A second single, "Metaforce", featuring a rap by Rakim, preceded the 1999 release of the concept album The Seduction of Claude Debussy, a cohesive concept album depicting the life and works of Claude Debussy, on the ZTT label.

This album later formed the basis of a 17-minute soundtrack for London's Millennium fireworks celebrations on the banks of the River Thames. The firework display was synchronised to an edit of "Seduction" which also featured a collage of samples from some of Britain's most famous pop and rock songs, plus classical composers. It was broadcast live on 95.8 Capital FM and BBC London 94.9. Trevor Horn worked on the project with Jill Sinclair, Bob Geldof, Capital Radio executive Clive Dickens and producer Ross Ford.

After performing a handful of live shows in the UK and US, the band dissolved. A DVD (Into Vision) and CD (Reconstructed) were released in 2002 and 2003 respectively, featuring music recorded and filmed in Chicago, at the Coachella Festival (10 September 1999), at the Shepherd's Bush Empire (22 March 2000) and Fountain Studios, Wembley, London (1 June 2000).

=== Later work ===
A reunion of sorts occurred at a 30 November 2013 live performance by the BBC Concert Orchestra (with a live BBC radio broadcast) including Dudley's orchestral arrangement of the band's EP Into Battle and a new piece entitled "Rhythm of a Decade" by Dudley and narrated by Morley. In their programme notes, they explain "Rhythm of a Decade" was inspired by an unreleased Art of Noise piece: "Of the many Art of Noise albums that did not appear – even if they were recorded – was one that set out to represent various decades through the rhythms that appeared during that particular decade – charting the development of rhythmical patterns and the physical changes in drum sounds throughout the 1950s, 1960s, 1970s, 1980s and 1990s".

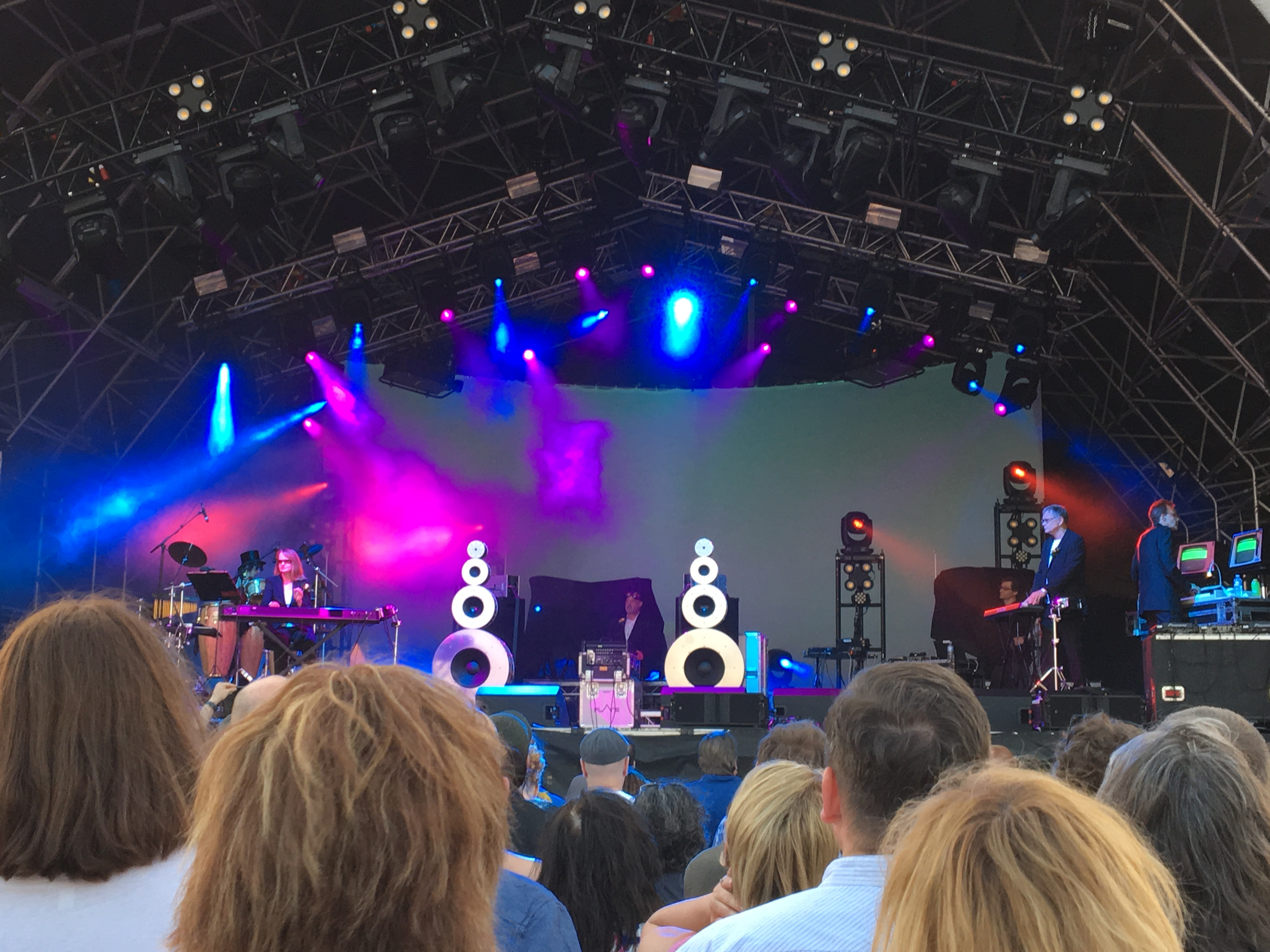
Art of Noise performing live at Liverpool Sound City in May 2017

On 25 May 2017 Art of Noise members Langan, Dudley and Jeczalik reunited as Reboot Art of Noise, performing at Liverpool Sound City as special support for The Human League during the festival's Pioneers of British Electronic Music.

The three appeared again when they played highlights from their In Visible Silence album plus other career highlights as "Dudley, Jeczalik, Langan" at the British Library in London on 9 March 2018 as part of the library's "Season of Sound" celebrating 140 years of recorded sound. This performance included a recorded video intro and outro from Paul Morley.

Most recently, Jeczalik and Langan have been performing intermittent live dates as The Art of Noise/Revision/VJ Set, with a four-person line-up also including video operator Ian Peel (a long-term Art of Noise chronicler) and Chilean musician/producer Raimundo Ladrón de Guevara (and following "very good-humoured discussions and input from Trevor Horn, Anne Dudley and Paul Morley").

=== Re-releases ===
In 2003, a 20th-anniversary edition of Into Battle was released the first time in CD form in Germany, including bonus tracks and a bonus DVD of their promo videos and a selected discography slideshow of album art. The CD substituted the original version of "Beat Box" with the later "Diversion One".

In early 2004, the Karvavena label released an Art of Noise tribute album, The Abduction of The Art of Noise. This album contains covers of various tracks, including a new version of "Beat Box" performed by J.J. Jeczalik under his Art of Silence moniker. 2004 saw Dudley and Horn perform "Close (To the Edit)" together at a The Prince's Trust charity event.

In 2006, Lol Creme, Trevor Horn and others formed Producers, a band made up of record producers and musicians. Gary Langan was the band's audio engineer.

21 August 2006 saw ZTT release a 4-CD Art of Noise box set, titled And What Have You Done with My Body, God?, which consisted of tracks exclusively from the 1983–85 ZTT era, from the initial tentative demos created by Gary Langan and J.J. Jeczalik in the wake of the Yes 90125 sessions, to selections from the Ambassadors Theatre performances featuring Horn and Morley, recorded at concerts profiling ZTT acts—prior to which, Langan, Jeczalik, and Dudley had abandoned the label (and, for the time being, the band). The set featured over 40 unreleased remixes, demos, and works in progress, as well as the complete vinyl version of Into Battle... – sourced from the original masters – for the first time on CD. The project was conceived, researched and compiled by music journalist (and Art of Noise aficionado) Ian Peel, who also wrote the box set's accompanying 36-page book, which featured new interviews with all of the original members.

In April 2011, Peel continued his archiving of classic and vaulted ZTT material, now named the Element Series, with a Deluxe Edition reissue of Into Battle with the Art of Noise. This was intended to be the first of a chronological remastering and repackaging of the Art of Noise's output, collating the original album or EP with extended and previously unavailable tracks. Who's Afraid of the Art of Noise?, considered the first "true" AON album, was released as a Deluxe Edition on 19 September 2011.

In May 2017, a two-disc deluxe edition of In Visible Silence was released. Included is the remastered album, along with several remixes and B-sides, taken from previous 12" singles and available on CD for the first time. Also included are outtakes and unreleased material from the group's time with China Records. Shortly thereafter, a similar deluxe edition of their next album, In No Sense? Nonsense! was released.

=== Other work ===
The Art of Noise wrote and recorded the theme music to the popular British game show The Krypton Factor, which was used from 1986 to 1993; the group also composed the short music pieces that introduced each of the six rounds. The group also composed and performed the opening theme for the third series of the chat show The Max Headroom Show. The track, titled "Happy Harry's High Club" (after a phrase spoken by Max Headroom on Paranoimia), is featured on In Visible Silence.

== Discography ==
- Who's Afraid of the Art of Noise? (1984)
- In Visible Silence (1986)
- In No Sense? Nonsense! (1987)
- Below the Waste (1989)
- The Seduction of Claude Debussy (1999)

== Videography ==
- "The Art of Noise in: Visible Silence" (1986) – a concert filmed in the Hammersmith Odeon on 15 August 1986.
- The Art of Noise: "Into Vision" (2002) – four different concerts between 1999 and 2000 in Chicago; The Coachella Valley Music and Arts Festival in California; in Shepherd's Bush, London; and in Wembley, London.

== Band members ==
Official Art of Noise members
1983–1985	Anne Dudley; J. J. Jeczalik; Gary Langan; Trevor Horn; Paul Morley
1985–1987	Anne Dudley; J.J. Jeczalik; Gary Langan
1987–1990	Anne Dudley; J.J. Jeczalik
1998–2000	Anne Dudley; Trevor Horn; Paul Morley; Lol Creme
2017	Anne Dudley; J.J. Jeczalik; Gary Langan

== See also ==
- List of Billboard number-one dance singles of 1984
- List of artists who reached number one on the U.S. Dance Club Songs chart
- Musique concrète
