= Moments in Love =

1985 song by Art of Noise

- Cover art photography by Anton Corbijn

Single by Art of Noise

from the album Into Battle with the Art of Noise and Who's Afraid of the Art of Noise?
- B-side: "Beat Box (Diversion Ten)"; "Love Beat"
- Released: 1 April 1985
- Recorded: 1983
- Genre: Ambient; chill-out; synth-pop
- Length: 10:15; 4:39 (7" edit)
- Label: ZTT (UK); Island (US); Music on Vinyl (reissue)
- Songwriter(s): Anne Dudley; Trevor Horn; J. J. Jeczalik; Gary Langan; Paul Morley
- Producer(s): Art of Noise

Art of Noise singles chronology
"Close (to the Edit)" (1984)	"Moments in Love" (1985)	"Legs" (1985)

"Moments in Love" is a song by the British avant-garde synth-pop group Art of Noise. It was released on the group's debut EP, Into Battle with the Art of Noise, in September 1983. It appeared on their debut studio album, Who's Afraid of the Art of Noise? (1984) and was released as its third single in 1985.

The song was a top 10 hit in the Netherlands in 1987.

== Background ==
Pitchfork named "Moments in Love" as Art of Noise's "masterwork", praising it as "an elegant New Age ode to romance embellished with fleet-footed strings and an echoing vocal sample that buries itself deep into your brain." The song played during Madonna's 1985 wedding to Sean Penn as they walked down the aisle. According to Trevor Horn, rapper Rakim told him that his favorite song of Horn's was "Moments in Love".

The song has been sampled several times, including by J Dilla, Charli XCX, Lil Wayne, Krayzie Bone, Play-N-Skillz, LL Cool J, and Drake.

In December 2023, the song peaked at No. 16 for two weeks on the TikTok Billboard Top 50.

== Formats and track listing ==
UK 7-inch single (ZTPS 02)

1. "Moments in Love (7'' Single Version)" – 4:40
2. "Beat Box (Diversion Ten)" – 3:58

UK 12-inch single (Moments in Love: The Art of Noise's Love Beat) (12ZTPS 02)

1. "Moments in Love (Beaten)" – 7:00
2. "Moments in Love (7" Single Version)" – 4:40
3. "Beatbox (Diversion Ten)" – 3:58
4. "Love Beat" – 5:15

US 12-inch single (0-96839)

1. "Moments in Love (Beaten)" – 7:00
2. "Moments in Love (7" Single Version)" – 4:40
3. "Beatbox (Diversion Ten)" – 3:58
4. "Love Beat" – 5:15

UK cassette (The Tortoise and the Hare) (CTIS 109)

1. "Moments in Love" – 8:37
2. "Moments in Love (Beaten)" – 5:33
3. "Love Beat" – 5:15
4. "Beat Box (Diversion Ten)" – 3:58

Tracks 1–3 are edits unique to the cassette release.

== Charts ==
=== Weekly charts ===
Chart (1987)	Peak position
Belgium (Ultratop 50 Flanders)	17
Netherlands (Dutch Top 40)	10
Netherlands (Single Top 100)	10
UK Singles (OCC)	87

=== Year-end charts ===
Chart (1987)	Position
Netherlands (Dutch Top 40)	94
Netherlands (Single Top 100)	64
