= Close (to the Edit) =

Single by Art of Noise

from the album Who's Afraid of the Art of Noise?
- Released: October 1984
- Recorded: March 1984
- Genre: Synth-pop; avant-garde; new wave
- Length: 5:34 (album version); 4:10 (edit)
- Label: ZTT
- Songwriters: Anne Dudley; Gary Langan; J. J. Jeczalik; Paul Morley; Trevor Horn
- Producer: Art of Noise

Art of Noise singles chronology
"Beat Box" (1983)	"Close (to the Edit)" (1984)	"Moments in Love" (1985)

Music video
- "Close (to the Edit)" on YouTube

"Close (to the Edit)" is a single by the English avant-garde synth-pop group Art of Noise, released in 1984 by ZTT Records. The song appeared on the group's debut studio album Who's Afraid of the Art of Noise? (1984) and different versions were issued on various other formats in October of that year. It was closely related to their earlier single (and hip-hop club hit) "Beat Box", though the two tracks were developed as separate pieces from an early stage. The single reached number eight in the UK singles chart in February 1985, and its music video won two awards at the 1985 MTV Video Music Awards. The song's spoken word "Hey!" has been sampled by a number of other artists through the years.

== History ==
The first release of a version of "Close (to the Edit)" was as a nominal remix of "Beat Box" under the title "Beat Box (Diversion Two)". This was then re-edited and partly remixed with different effects applied, to become the version of "Close (to the Edit)" which appeared on the subsequent studio album Who's Afraid of the Art of Noise? (1984). Paul Morley's sleevenotes for the single simplify the relationship between "Diversion Two" and "Close", noting only that 20 seconds were "snipped out".

The song takes its title from the fifth studio album Close to the Edge (1972) by the progressive rock band Yes. Its working title was "Close to the Edge". Morley said, "We created the music through editing, and so changed the title. Being perverse and provocative I put the brackets in." The song also samples the 1983 songs "Leave It" and "Owner of a Lonely Heart" by the same band, both of which Trevor Horn produced. The single heavily features the recorded sample of a car, a Volkswagen Golf owned by a neighbour of band member J. J. Jeczalik, stalling and restarting. It also contains a (re-sung) vocal sample from the song "Beer Barrel Polka", as performed by the Andrews Sisters.

The short spoken-word vocal and the "Hey!" sample – used in a number of songs, most notably in "Firestarter" by the Prodigy and "Back in the Day" by Christina Aguilera (uncredited) – was the voice of Camilla Pilkington-Smyth. Jeczalik's girlfriend at the time taught at a girls' school in Ascot and brought Pilkington-Smyth, one of her pupils, to his attention. The sample of her voice was recorded by Jeczalik in a chapel using a Revox A77 tape recorder.

The single was released in the UK on what had become ZTT's customary array of formats: standard and picture disc 7-inch versions, five 12-inch singles (one a picture disc) and a cassette single, each featuring a number of unique mixes. The many remixes were given their own titles derived from the overall title, including "Edited", "Closely Closely (Enough's Enough)" and "Close-Up".

The cassette single version, That Was Close, is a medley of a number of the mixes from the various formats, featuring "Diversion Eight", "Diversion Two", "Closest", "Close-Up", the album version of "Close (to the Edit)" and "Closed". This medley lasts in excess of 20 minutes in length, repeats on both sides of the cassette, and remained otherwise unavailable until it was included in its entirety on the 4-CD box set compilation album And What Have You Done with My Body, God? (2006).

The single was Art of Noise's first major UK hit, reaching number eight in the UK singles chart in February 1985.

== Music videos ==
Three promotional videos were filmed for the single. The original version, featuring a little girl in punk garb leading three business suit-clad men in the destruction of various musical instruments, was directed by the Polish filmmaker Zbigniew Rybczyński and filmed on the High Line in Manhattan. In a 1999 interview with the band, Paul Morley said, "The male members of the band were slightly disturbed that they were made to come off as Huey Lewis and the News ... so one of the reasons we tend to hide behind masks or not appear at all is because it opens up more possibilities how Art of Noise can be presented. Sometimes you had video art directors get excited about how they were going to present Art of Noise, and in that particular case, he interpreted it as a strange young girl with Huey Lewis & The News. Half of it was fun and half of it was slightly sad." Anne Dudley "thought it was a fun video", but added that "some people thought it was unnecessarily violent. It was banned in New Zealand as encouraging violence towards children. Nothing could have been further from our minds." The video later won the awards for Most Experimental Video and Best Editing at the 1985 MTV Video Music Awards.

A second video version directed by Matt Forrest aired in the UK, composed almost entirely of surreal animation, with some clips from the original version.

A third video version, mostly identical to the second video version, included various shots of the band in-studio.

== Legacy ==
In a 2003 article on the greatest musique concrète for Pitchfork, musician Drew Daniel of experimental electronic music duo Matmos included "Close (to the Edit)" in a list of works that arguably built upon musique concrète in new ways. Simon Reynolds highlighted the manner in which the music video provided a "witty visual emblem" for the group's "updated version of musique concrète's slice-and-dice methods." He also noted that the song can be contextualised as "a homage to Kraftwerk and their 'Autobahn'-era notion of the car as a musical instrument", due to the use of a revving motor as a melodic riff throughout Art of Noise's hit. The track is classified as sound collage by writer Robert Fink, who notes that the track features the Fairlight CMI's 'ORCH5' orchestra hit preset which, in its final moments, mixes "back into congeries of sampled orchestral blasts from Stravinsky's [The] Rite of Spring." Danny Turner of MusicRadar commented that the track highlights Art of Noise's "clever use of disembodied vocal samples and found sounds", and noted that it "arguably featured the first ever sampled and sequenced bass line."

== Live performance ==
The track was performed live by Horn and Anne Dudley during Horn's 2004 all-star charity event Produced by Trevor Horn (later released on DVD as Slaves to the Rhythm), celebrating Horn's 25th anniversary as a record producer. The performance featured Yes's Alan White on drums and 10cc's Lol Creme on guitar. Almost all of the elements of it (except for a spoken phrase by Camilla Pilkington-Smyth, which was pre-recorded) were live, as opposed to programmed or sequenced: Horn played his elaborate bass part on a 5-string bass, Dudley played live synths and triggered all the samples from the original track (including the "dum-dum" chant) from a Roland keyboard, the "tra-la-la" vocals (originally an Andrews Sisters sample) were sung live by Linda Allen and Debi Doss of Buggles fame, all the other instruments were played by members of the onstage orchestra, and the whole piece was played faster than the original (about 135-136 BPM rather than 129). Indeed, Horn introduced the performance by emphasizing the live nature of it and stating that, since the original piece was "played by machines" (i.e. programmed), the band would introduce some deliberate mistakes to prove that everybody was live. In fact, the actual performance does not include any mistakes, but some of Dudley's melodic synth lines are slightly different from the studio version.

Former Art of Noise members J. J. Jeczalik and Gary Langan do not feature in the performance, nor does music journalist and MC Paul Morley. In spite of this, the track is listed on the DVD cover and menu as being performed by Art of Noise.

== Formats and track listings ==
=== 7-inch: ZTT / ZTPS 01 United Kingdom ===
1. "Close (to the Edit)" – 3:51*
2. "A Time to Hear (Who's Listening?)" – 3:32**
- * Based on an edit of the LP version on Who's Afraid of the Art of Noise? (1984)
- ** A montage of extracts and out-takes from the LP.

=== 12-inch: ZTT / 12 ZTPS 01 United Kingdom ===
1. "Close-Up" – 7:37*
2. "Close-Up (Hop)" – 5:10
- * Significantly different to the LP version.
- This is the first 12-inch release.

=== 12-inch: ZTT / 12 ZTPS 01 United Kingdom ===
1. "Close-Up" – 7:37
2. "Close-Up (Hop)" – 5:10
3. "Close (to the Edit)" – 3:51*
- * Seven-inch version.
- This is the second 12-inch release.

=== 12-inch: ZTT / 12 ZTPS 01 United Kingdom ===
1. "Closely Closely (Enough's Enough)" – 7:15*
2. "Moments in Love" – 10:17**
3. "A Time to Hear (You're Listening)" – 3:29***
- * Resembles the LP version much more than "Close-Up".
- ** LP version.
- *** Same as 7-inch B-side with different title.
- This is the third 12-inch release.

=== 12-inch: ZTT / 12 ZTPS 01 United Kingdom ===
1. "Closely Closely (Enough's Enough)" – 7:15
2. "Close-Up (Hop)" – 5:10
3. "A Time to Hear (Who's Listening?)" – 3:32
- This is the fourth 12-inch release.

=== 12-inch: ZTT / 12 ZTPS 01 United Kingdom ===
1. "Edited" – 5:32*
2. "Close-Up (Hop)" – 5:10**
3. "A Time to Hear (Who's Listening?)" – 3:27
- * Similar to the LP version with additional overdubs and effects.
- ** "Close-Up (Hop)" is not listed on this release.
- Picture disc.

=== 7-inch: ISL / 7-99754 United States ===
1. "Close (to the Edit)" – 4:10*
2. "(Do) Donna (Do)" – 3:10**
- * Early fade of LP version.
- ** Extended mix of Into Battle track "Donna".

=== 12-inch: ISL / DMD 744 United States ===
1. "Close (to the Edit)" (LP version) – 5:35
2. "Close (to the Edit)" (edit) – 4:10*
3. "Beat Box (Diversion 1)" – 8:33
  - Early fade of LP version.
- US promo.

=== Cassette single: ZTT / CTIS 106 United Kingdom ===
That Was Close – continuous medley comprising:

1. "Diversion Eight" – 2:05
2. "Close (to the Edit)" (album version) – 5:34 – listed as "Diversion Two"
3. "Closest" – 0:43
4. "Close-Up" – 7:18
5. "Close (to the Edit)" (7-inch version) – 3:26
6. "Closed" – 1:30
- Total length: 20:36

Note:

- Several earlier demo versions and rejected mixes appear on the box set And What Have You Done with My Body, God? (2006)

"Close-Up"
An excerpt from the 12-inch version "Close-Up".
