= Beat Box (Art of Noise song) =

Single by Art of Noise

from the album Into Battle with the Art of Noise
- Released: December 1983
- Recorded: 1983
- Genre: Hip hop; musique concrète
- Length: 4:48 (album version); 2:55 (7-inch edit); 8:30 (12-inch remix)
- Label: ZTT; Island
- Songwriters: Anne Dudley; Trevor Horn; J. J. Jeczalik; Gary Langan; Paul Morley
- Producer: Trevor Horn

Art of Noise singles chronology
"Beat Box" (1983)	"Close (to the Edit)" (1984)

"Beat Box"
Sample of the Art of Noise song "Beat Box".

"Beat Box" is a song by the English avant-garde synth-pop group Art of Noise. Originally appearing as the second track on the 12-inch EP Into Battle with the Art of Noise (1983), it was released as the group's first single in December 1983.

"Beat Box" is an instrumental, experimental piece that implements sounds and noises (such as car key ignitions, falling drain water, and calliope music—most notably on the chorus) to ride the rhythm of the beat (a sample of drums played by Alan White of the progressive rock band Yes).

As a single, the song reached the lower regions of the UK Singles Chart, where it peaked at no. 92. It was more popular with dance music and (particularly) hip hop audiences, and in February 1984 the song reached no. 1 on the American dance chart, where it remained for two weeks. "Beat Box" was a hit on the Black Singles chart, where it reached number 10. The US 7-inch single spent five weeks on the Billboard Bubbling Under chart, starting 7 April 1984 and spending two weeks at no. 101, the chart's top position.

== Legacy ==
In a contemporary review, Cashbox highlighted the drum programming and likened the vocal delivery to that of Laurie Anderson. In 2019, Stephen Dalton of Record Collector included "Beat Box" in his guide to Horn's work, describing it as "a mechanised blast of musique concrete which later evolved into ... 'Close (To The Edit)'." Simon Reynolds wrote that "Beat Box" was a popular song with breakdancers in the United States, where Art of Noise were frequently assumed to be a black group.

== Track listing ==
=== 7-inch: ZTT. / ZTIS 103 United Kingdom ===
1. "Beat Box" – 2:55
2. "Moments in Love" – 4:02
- Released in 1983.

=== 7-inch: ZTT. / ZTIS 108 United Kingdom ===
1. "Beat Box" (Diversion Six) – 3:57
2. "Beat Box" (Diversion Seven) – 4:09
- Released in 1984.

=== 12-inch: ZTT. / ZTIS 108 United Kingdom ===
1. "Beat Box" (Diversion One) – 8:33
2. "Beat Box" (Diversion Two) – 6:04
- Released in 1984.

== Charts ==
Chart performance for "Beat Box"
Chart (1984)	Peak position
UK Singles (OCC)	92
US Billboard Bubbling Under Hot 100 Singles	101
US Billboard Hot Black Singles	10
US Billboard Hot Dance Club Play	1

== See also ==
- List of number-one dance singles of 1984 (U.S.)
