= Anne Dudley =

English composer and keyboardist

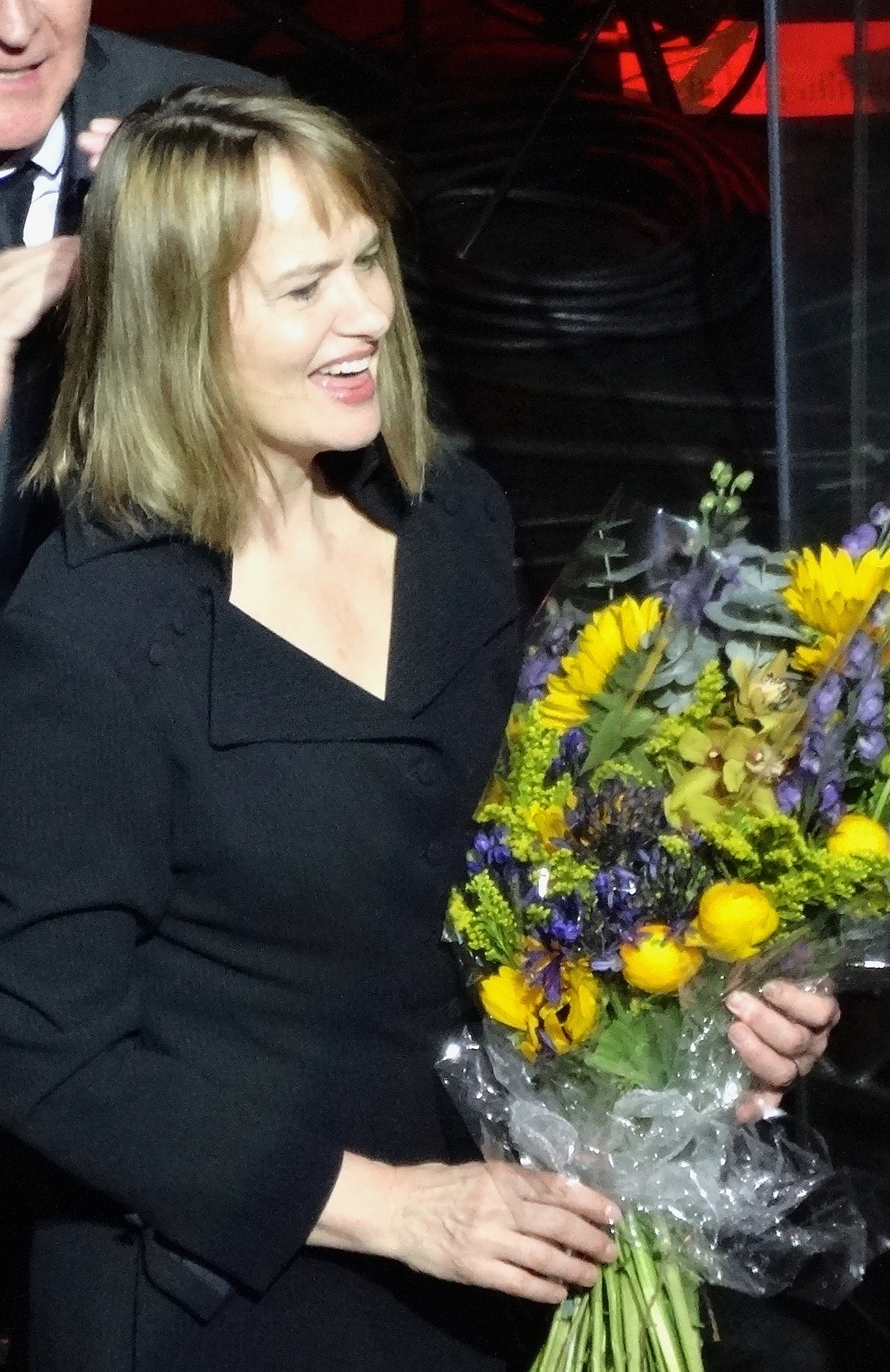
- Dudley in March 2014

Background information
- Born: Anne Jennifer Beckingham; 7 May 1956 (age 70); Chatham, Kent, England
- Genres: Film scores; electronic; synth-pop; new wave
- Occupations: Composer; pianist; keyboardist; songwriter
- Instrument: Keyboards
- Labels: Angel; EMI
- Formerly of: Art of Noise
- Website: annedudley.co.uk

Anne Jennifer Dudley (née Beckingham; born 7 May 1956) is an English composer, keyboardist, conductor and pop musician. She was the BBC Concert Orchestra's first Composer in Association in 2001. She has worked in the classical and pop genres, as a film composer, and was one of the core members of the synth-pop band Art of Noise. In 1998, Dudley won an Oscar for Best Original Musical or Comedy Score for The Full Monty. In addition to over twenty other film scores, in 2012 she served as music producer for the film version of Les Misérables, also acting as arranger and composing some new additional music.

== Background ==
Dudley was born in Chatham, Kent. She attended Eltham Hill Grammar School for Girls. She graduated with a master's degree in music from King's College London in 1978. Trained as a classical performer, she moved into the competitive commercial field as a session musician, where her professional relationship with Trevor Horn began.

== Career ==
Dudley, along with Biddu and Ron Roker composed the song "Dancin' Me to Ecstasy" for Hot Cuisine. Backed with "All Fired Up", it was released on Kaleidoscope Records Limited in January 1981. It was reviewed in the 31 January issue of Record Mirror. James Hamilton noted the ska feel of the record which he called a "140bpm 12in pop galloper" with the "traditional disco trappings". He also wrote that hip deejays would prefer the B side which he referred to as a 122bpm jiggly smacking song which was mellower and more manageable. Both sides of record also debuted at No. 77 in the Record Mirror UK Disco chart that week. The record peaked at No. 53 for the week of 28 February. With Biddu and Roker, Dudley wrote another song for Hot Cuisine with "Ride on a Rhythm. Biddu produced the A side and Roy Carter remixed it. Backed with "Live My Life", it was released on Kaleidoscope in March 1982. Debuting at No. 62 on the Record Mirror Pop Oriented Dance chart for the week of 10 April 1982, it peaked at No. 54 for the week of 8 May.

In 1982, Dudley contributed to the ABC album The Lexicon of Love, produced by Trevor Horn. She went from fleshing out keyboard parts to scoring the album's orchestrations (which were, according to Horn, her first-ever string arrangements) and also co-writing one of the songs.

Dudley was a founding member of the band Art of Noise in 1983, which helped pioneer the use of sampling within pop music. Their hits include "Beat Box" (1984), "Moments in Love" (1984), "Close (to the Edit)" (1984), "Peter Gunn Theme" with Duane Eddy (1986), "Legs" (1985), "Paranoimia" (1986) which featured a monologue about insomnia by the artificial intelligence character Max Headroom, and, with Tom Jones, "Kiss", a top 10 in 1988. Art of Noise also produced the theme tune to the ITV game show The Krypton Factor which was used between 1986 and 1993. "(Theme From) The Krypton Factor" was composed and recorded in 1986 and was reworked as "Crusoe" on their 1987 album.

Dudley's association with Trevor Horn and Art of Noise led on to working with artists such as Frankie Goes to Hollywood, Seal, Marc Almond, Rod Stewart, Robbie Williams and, more recently, Siphiwo. She has co-written songs with Malcolm McLaren ("Buffalo Gals"), Cathy Dennis ("Too Many Walls"), and a 1930s-inspired song with Sting called "This Was Never Meant to Be".

She produced the Tom Jones hit "You Can Leave Your Hat On" (1988) and the Debbie Harry single "Strike Me Pink" (1993).

In 1989, Dudley produced and conducted the string arrangements for the eponymous debut album by Welsh pop duo Waterfront. Her intricate production is demonstrated most notably on the song "Nature of Love", which was released as a single in both the UK and US. Another collaboration in 1989 was with Neil Tennant from Pet Shop Boys and Bernard Sumner of New Order; Dudley contributed the lush string arrangements on their debut Electronic release, "Getting Away with It", which peaked at #12 in the UK in December 1989, and #38 in the US in 1990.

Dudley produced two tracks on the 2002 Opera Babes album Beyond Imagination (ranking No. 1 on the UK classical charts for 11 weeks, and No. 4 on the US Billboard charts). In 2004, she produced the album Voice for Alison Moyet. The album, an eclectic collection of cover versions, reached No. 7 on the UK Albums Chart.

Her works for orchestra include "Northern Lights", a 14-minute reflection of Norway's Aurora Borealis for full orchestra, performed in 2005 and 2006 at the Royal Festival Hall and broadcast on BBC Radio 3's Late Junction programme in May 2005.

Her first commission as Composer in Association with the BBC Concert Orchestra was "Music and Silence", inspired by the novel of the same name by Rose Tremain and first performed at The Royal Festival Hall in 2002.

Dudley arranged Bach's Chaconne from Partita in D minor for piano trio, and a recording by the Eroica Trio appears on their Baroque album.

Her album Ancient and Modern, with modern versions of some traditional hymns and Bach chorales, was released in 1999.

She was the musical director for Bill Bailey's Remarkable Guide to the Orchestra, first performed in Brighton then at the Royal Albert Hall in 2008, which was recorded and released as a DVD in December 2009. The show was toured in 2009 with eight different regional orchestras participating.

Dudley collaborated with Sam Taylor-Wood in producing the sound and video installation Sigh at the White Cube in 2008. This work featured the BBC Concert Orchestra on eight large projected screens, miming to Dudley's score.

In 2019, 2022 and 2024, she conducted the Southbank Sinfonia during Martin Fry's Lexicon of Love tour.

=== Film scores ===
Dudley's career in film music has spanned nearly 40 years and her film scores include:

- Buster (1988), a British comedy drama starring musician Phil Collins, Julie Walters, Larry Lamb and Sheila Hancock;
- Silence Like Glass (Zwei Frauen) (1989), German-made but set in a cancer ward at a hospital in America;
- The Pope Must Die (1991), a comedy film starring Robbie Coltrane, the score of which was co-written with Jeff Beck;
- Knight Moves (1992), an American thriller directed by Carl Schenkel and starring Christopher Lambert;
- The Crying Game (1992), an Irish/British drama film written and directed by Neil Jordan;
- Felidae (1994), German animated mystery film about cats investigating a serial killer;
- The Grotesque (1995), released in the US as Gentlemen Don't Eat Poets a British film starring Alan Bates, Theresa Russell and Sting;
- Hollow Reed (1996), a drama directed by Angela Pope and set in Bath;
- When Saturday Comes (1996), starring Sean Bean, Pete Postlethwaite, Emily Lloyd. Directed by Maria Giese;
- The Full Monty (1997), a Peter Cattaneo-directed comedy about six unemployed steel workers who decide to form a male striptease act. Dudley won the "Best Original Musical or Comedy Score" Oscar for her music;
- American History X (1998), an American drama directed by Tony Kaye, starring Edward Norton and Edward Furlong;
- Pushing Tin (1999), directed by Mike Newell and starring John Cusack and Billy Bob Thornton, a comedy-drama film based around air traffic controllers in New York;
- The Miracle Maker (2000), an animated feature film made for TV by BBC Wales with Russian model makers;
- Lucky Break (2001), a British feelgood comedy starring James Nesbitt and based around a prison escape;
- Monkeybone (2001), an American film combining live-action and stop-motion animation directed by Henry Selick, starring Brendan Fraser and Bridget Fonda;
- The Gathering (2002), an Anthony Horowitz thriller directed by Brian Gilbert and starring Christina Ricci;
- A Man Apart (2003), starring Vin Diesel;
- Bright Young Things (2003), a British drama written and directed by Stephen Fry based on the novel Vile Bodies by Evelyn Waugh;
- Black Book (2006), a World War II film directed by Paul Verhoeven;
- Tristan & Isolde (2006), a Ridley Scott romantic drama based on the medieval romantic legend of Tristan and Iseult and starring James Franco and Sophia Myles;
- Perfect Creature (2007), a New Zealand-made horror/thriller film starring Leo Gregory;
- The Walker (2007), a drama written and directed by Paul Schrader set in Washington, D. C.;
- Les Misérables (2012), a blockbuster version of the celebrated long-running musical (music producer / arranger / additional music composer).
- Elle (2016), a French thriller directed by Paul Verhoeven, starring Isabelle Huppert.
- The Hustle (2019), an American comedy film directed by Chris Addison, starring Anne Hathaway and Rebel Wilson.
- Benedetta (2020), a French/Italian erotic drama directed by Paul Verhoeven, starring Virginie Efira.
- Fing! (2026), an Australian/British family adventure film, starring Taika Waititi.

Her TV music includes:

- Scores for all episodes of Jeeves and Wooster with Stephen Fry and Hugh Laurie;
- Mr Wakefield's Crusade starring Peter Capaldi;
- Lynda La Plante's Above Suspicion;
- Kavanagh QC, an ITV series with John Thaw
- The Tenth Kingdom, an American epic fantasy TV miniseries written by Simon Moore.
- Poldark (2015), a BBC TV series
- The Inspector Alleyn Mysteries, a BBC TV series with the pilot in 1990 and two subsequent series in 1993 and 1994.
- The Velveteen Rabbit
- The Forsytes (2025), a Channel 5 and Masterpiece TV series

=== Session musician work ===
Dudley's work as a session musician and string and orchestral arrangements includes:

- ABC – The Lexicon of Love album (reaching No. 1 in the UK charts 1982) and The Lexicon of Love II released May 2016;
- a-ha – string scores for the singles "Hunting High & Low" (7" remix) (1986) and "The Blood That Moves the Body" (1988)
- Oleta Adams – Circle of One album (reaching No. 1 in the UK charts 1991);
- Marc Almond – Tenement Symphony album which included the tracks "Jacky" and "The Days of Pearly Spencer";
- The Associates – Wild and Lonely album;
- Rick Astley – Free album;
- B*Witched – Awake and Breathe album;
- Chris Botti – Slowing Down the World album;
- Boyzone – A Different Beat album;
- Cher – It's a Man's World album;
- Petula Clark – "La Vie en Rose" track;
- Lloyd Cole and the Commotions – Rattlesnakes album; string arranger
- Andrea Corr – Ten Feet High album;
- Cathy Dennis – Move to This and Into the Skyline albums;
- Electronic – "Getting Away with It" single (reaching No. 12 in the UK charts and number 38 in the US in 1990);
- Frankie Goes to Hollywood – Welcome to the Pleasuredome album which included their second and third No. 1s "Two Tribes" and "The Power of Love";
- Elton John – The Big Picture album;
- Martyn Joseph – Being There album;
- Kingmaker – Sleepwalking album;
- Annie Lennox – Medusa album (No. 1 in the UK charts 1995);
- Let Loose – "Best in Me" single;
- Virginia MacNaughton – The Music album;
- Paul McCartney – Press to Play and Give My Regards to Broad Street albums;
- Malcolm McLaren – Duck Rock album;
- The Men They Couldn't Hang – "A Map of Morocco" single;
- George Michael – "Careless Whisper" single (reaching No. 1 in 25 countries);
- Liza Minnelli – Results album (reaching No. 6 in the UK charts in 1989);
- The Moody Blues – Greatest Hits album;
- Moist – "Gasoline" single;
- Jimmy Nail – Crocodile Shoes album (reaching No. 2 in the UK charts in 1994);
- The Painted Word – Lovelife album;
- OMD – Universal album;
- Pet Shop Boys – Very, Concrete and Fundamental albums;
- Propaganda— A Secret Wish album;
- Pulp – Different Class and This Is Hardcore albums (both reaching No. 1);
- Rialto – "Monday Morning 5:19" single;
- Frances Ruffelle – "Stranger to the Rain" single;
- Rush – Power Windows album;
- S Club – 7 album (No. 1 in the UK charts in 2000);
- Scarlet – Naked album;
- Seal – Seal, Seal II and Human Being albums;
- Siphiwo – Hope album (featuring Nelson Mandela on the title track);
- Wendy Stark – Stark album;
- Rod Stewart – A Spanner in the Works and If We Fall in Love Tonight albums, and the single "Downtown Train";
- Suggs – The Lone Ranger album;
- TM Network – Carol: A Day in a Girl's Life album;
- Travis – "More Than Us" EP, featuring Dudley on the title track;
- Tina Turner – Wildest Dreams album;
- Wet Wet Wet – Holding Back the River album (reaching No. 2 in the UK charts 1989);
- Wham! – "Everything She Wants" single and "Young Guns (Go for It)", their first hit single;
- Robbie Williams – Reality Killed the Video Star album;
- Will Young – Friday's Child album (reaching No. 1 in the UK charts in 2004) and "Leave Right Now" single (reaching No. 1 in the UK charts in 2003).

=== Awards ===
In addition to Dudley's Academy Award for The Full Monty, she has received a number of awards and nominations.

- Ivor Novello Award (3 nominations): for Crime Traveller, Best Original Music for Broadcast 1997; for The Key, Best Original Music for Television 2003; and for Trial and Retribution, Best Television Soundtrack 2008.
- BASCA Gold Badge Award: 14 October 2014, in recognition of their unique contribution to music.

Award	Year	Category	Work	Result	Ref.
Academy Awards	1998	Best Original Musical or Comedy Score	The Full Monty	Won	
Brit Awards	1989	Best Soundtrack/Cast Recording	Buster	Won	
Brit Awards	1998	Best Soundtrack/Cast Recording	The Full Monty	Won	
British Academy Film Awards	1998	Best Original Music	The Full Monty	Nominated	
British Academy Television Awards	1993	Best Original Music	Jeeves and Wooster	Nominated	
British Academy Television Awards	2016	Best Original Music	Poldark	Nominated	
British Academy Television Awards	2017	Best Original Music	Poldark	Nominated	
César Awards	2017	Best Original Music	Elle	Nominated	
Children's and Family Emmy Awards	2025	Outstanding Music Direction and Composition for a Live Action Program	The Velveteen Rabbit	Nominated	
Grammy Awards	1987	Best Rock Instrumental Performance	"Peter Gunn"	Won	
Grammy Awards	1988	Best Pop Instrumental Performance	"Dragnet"	Nominated	
Juno Awards	2004	Songwriter of the Year	Folklore	Nominated	

Other honours

- 2004: Made a Fellow of The Royal College of Music
- 2011: Awarded an honorary doctorate from the University of Kent

== Television appearances ==
- Dudley appeared on the 2018/2019 Christmas University Challenge representing King's College London alongside Anita Anand (captain), Angela Saini, and Zoe Laughlin.

== Discography (excluding work from Art of Noise) ==
- Buster (1988)
- Songs from the Victorious City (1991) (collaboration with Killing Joke's Jaz Coleman)
- Jeeves and Wooster Album titled "The World of Jeeves & Wooster" (1991)
- The Pope Must Die (1991)
- The Crying Game (1992)
- Felidae (1994)
- Gentlemen Don't Eat Poets (1995)
- American History X (1998)
- Ancient and Modern (1999)
- Pushing Tin (1999)
- The 10th Kingdom (2000)
- A Different Light (2001)
- Monkeybone (2001)
- Seriously Chilled (2003)
- Club Classical: Orchestral Chillout Sounds (2003) (BBC Music Magazine free cover disc compilation CD of live and studio recordings, also including two works by Dave Heath)
- Tristan & Isolde (2006)
- Black Book (2006)
- Crossing the Bar (2022)
