= J. J. Jeczalik =

British electronic musician

- Born: Jonathan Edward Stephen Jeczalik; Banbury, Oxfordshire, England
- Genres: Electronic; synth-pop; new wave; pop; rock
- Occupations: Composer; musician; record producer; ex-teacher
- Instruments: Synthesizers; Fairlight CMI
- Member of: Art of Noise
- Website: theartofnoiseonline.com

Jonathan Edward Stephen "J. J." Jeczalik (/jɛnˈtʃɑːlɪk/) is an English electronic musician/record producer, co-founder of the electronic music group the Art of Noise. He taught IT at Oxford High School until his retirement in 2013.

== Before Art of Noise ==
Educated at Durham University, Jeczalik began his journey into music after coming to London and promoting a gig for a pub group called Landscape (of Einstein A Go-Go fame), then later roadied for their co-lead singer Richard James Burgess before meeting the Buggles a.k.a. Trevor Horn and Geoff Downes.

Before becoming a freelance programmer Jeczalik worked for Downes, programming the Fairlight CMI, as Downes had problems with the machine. After that he became a part of Horn’s production team before working on ABC's The Lexicon of Love and Malcolm McLaren's Duck Rock albums.

== Art of Noise and freelance work ==
When the Fairlight CMI Series II came out in 1982, Jeczalik got access to "Page R", the built-in sequencer for the Fairlight. While working on the Yes album 90125, Jeczalik was experimenting with drum and percussion samples from Yes' drummer, Alan White. Jeczalik, along with sound engineer Gary Langan, sequenced drum beats and breaks in Page R and created "Beat Box", the debut single for Art of Noise.

During production of Malcolm McLaren's album Duck Rock, Jeczalik and Langan met Anne Dudley, a classical music session musician and composer. Along with Horn, Langan, Dudley and Paul Morley, Jeczalik co-founded Art of Noise in 1983.

As a freelancer, he was in a minority of musicians around the globe that used CMIs to create music, but unlike his contemporaries, at the time Jeczalik developed his own way of creating noises by taking advantage of the machine's then-poor quality audio output and transformed the distorted samples into unrecognisable sounds. Some of these early ideas can be heard on the Kate Bush album The Dreaming.

One night those techniques would change the way that records were made when Langan asked him to help out with an idea. Jeczalik sampled a scrapped drum riff from a session of the Yes album 90125. That would become Art of Noise, a two-man side project that became a quintet with Dudley, Horn and Paul Morley as additions to the line-up.

They were the first act signed to ZTT Records in 1983 and launched it with the EP entitled Into Battle with the Art of Noise that broke new ground, leading to numerous innovative follow-up hit singles and albums for the rest of the 1980s. Jeczalik was also instrumental behind the success of controversial Liverpool band, Frankie Goes to Hollywood with their number one hit singles "Relax" and "Two Tribes" also on ZTT. Other work for the label involved further work for FGTH on the Welcome to the Pleasuredome album and for another two signings, Propaganda and Andrew Poppy.

The future Grammy Award winner continued freelance work as either a programmer, producer or remixer with his most notable work producing the hit singles "Kiss Me" by Stephen Duffy, "Opportunities (Let's Make Lots of Money)" by Pet Shop Boys, a cover of "Jezebel" by Shakin' Stevens and in 1987 composed the music for the BBC documentary The Case of Sherlock Holmes.

== Art of Silence and retirement from the music industry ==
In 1990, Art of Noise split, leaving Jeczalik to work on other projects including the Biographers' concept album Columbus with some of the recording done at his own Monsterrat Studios in Berkshire. J.J. Jeczalik’s Art of Sampling was released in 1993 including hundreds of samples from his personal audio library and was released on AMG's Hit Sound Producer label.

In 1995, Jeczalik launched Art of Silence (his spin-off to Art of Noise) and his label Axiomattic with the West 4 single, the album artofsilence.co.uk and website that all followed in the next year with Teach Me, his final release as a musician in 1997. He retired from the music business and taught ICT at two Oxfordshire schools until his retirement in 2013.

== Discography ==
=== Album ===
- 1993: JJ Jeczalik's Art of Sampling

=== Studio work ===
- 1981: "Sat in Your Lap" - Kate Bush; Fairlight programming; No. 11
- 1981: "Hand Held in Black and White" - Dollar; Fairlight programming; No. 19
- 1981: "Mirror Mirror (Mon Amor)" - Dollar; Fairlight programming; No. 4
- 1982: "Poison Arrow" - ABC; Fairlight programming; No. 6
- 1982: "Give Me Back My Heart" - Dollar; Fairlight programming; No. 4
- 1982: "The Look of Love" - ABC; Fairlight programming; No. 4
- 1982: "Videotheque" - Dollar; Fairlight programming; No. 17
- 1982: "All of My Heart" - ABC; Fairlight programming; No. 5
- 1982: "Buffalo Gals" - Malcolm McLaren and The World's Famous Supreme Team; Fairlight programming; No. 9
- 1983: "Soweto" - Malcolm McLaren; Fairlight programming; No. 32
- 1983: "Double Dutch" - Malcolm McLaren; Fairlight programming; No. 3
- 1983: "Owner of a Lonely Heart" - Yes; Fairlight programming; No. 28
- 1983: "Relax" - Frankie Goes To Hollywood; Fairlight programming; No. 1
- 1983: "Duck for the Oyster" - Malcolm McLaren; Fairlight programming; No. 54
- 1984: "Dr. Mabuse" - Propaganda; Fairlight programming; No. 27
- 1984: "Leave It" - Yes; Fairlight programming; No. 56
- 1984: "Absolute" - Scritti Politti; Fairlight programming; No. 17
- 1984: "Two Tribes" - Frankie Goes To Hollywood; Fairlight programming; No. 1
- 1984: "Young Hearts" (Sudden Africa Mix) - Silent Running; remix; No. 92
- 1984: "Plague of Hearts" - Flip; producer
- 1984: "Going Up in the World" - The Hostages; remix
- 1984: "Flesh for Fantasy" (Below the Belt Mix) - Billy Idol; Fairlight Programming; 54
- 1984: "Beat Boy" - Visage; Fairlight programming
- 1985: "Kiss Me" - Stephen Tin Tin Duffy; producer/Fairlight programming; No. 4
- 1985: "Cry" (Extended Remix) - Godley & Creme; remix; No. 19
- 1985: "Opportunities" - Pet Shop Boys; producer/Fairlight programming; No. 11
- 1986: "I Dream in Blue" - The Shine; Fairlight programming
- 1986: "Opportunities (Let's Make Lots of Money)" - Pet Shop Boys; producer/Fairlight programming; No. 116
- 1986: "Ready Made" - Fehlmann's Ready Made; Fairlight programming
- 1989: "Noisy (Aow Too Dou Zat)" - Jean Paul Gaultier; produced and mixed/Fairlight programming
- 1989: "Jezebel" - Shakin' Stevens; produced and remixed; No. 58
- 1989: "Primitive Man" - Eartha Kitt; mixed
- 1990: "It's Over" - Paul Monéo; producer
- 1997: "Out of the Fire" - Lock; producer
