= Maria Burton =

American director, producer, and actress

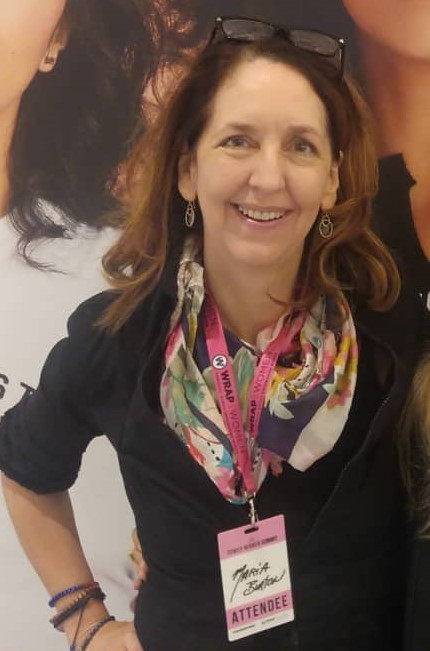
- Born: Buffalo, New York, United States
- Occupations: Director, producer, actress

Maria Burton is an American director, producer, and actress. She directed the feature films For the Love of George (2018), A Sort of Homecoming (2015), Manna From Heaven (2002), Just Friends (1996), Temps (1999), and co-directed the 2007 documentary "Sign My Snarling Movie: 25 Years of the Bobs".

== Early life and education ==
Burton was born in Buffalo, New York, and the daughter of Roger Burton, a professional jazz musician and actor and Gabrielle Burton, an award-winning screenwriter and novelist. With her sisters, Jennifer, Ursula, Gabrielle, and Charity, she runs Five Sisters Productions, a production company.

Burton graduated from Yale University with a degree in theater and filmmaking. She won first prize in the Earth Daughters' play writing contest for her play The Litany of the Clothes and was produced by Lorna Hills' UJIMA Company in Buffalo, New York. After New York she traveled to Los Angeles, and worked on numerous theater shows, including the musical A... My Name Is Alice.

== Directing career ==
=== 1996 ===
- Just Friends: A playful romantic comedy about what happens when a man meets the woman of his dreams, and it turns out she wants to be Just Friends.

=== 1999 ===
- Temps: Comedic film about the five friends from college, now in their late 20s, and their different attitudes towards their work and their personal lives at points of transition in their lives, both personally and professionally.

=== 2002 ===
- Manna from Heaven: Is a comedic fable about what happens when you get a gift from God (a financial windfall), but many years later you find out it was a just a loan and it's due immediately.

=== 2007 ===
- Sign My Snarling Movie: 25 Years of the Bobs (Documentary): Rising from the ashes of San Francisco's Western Onion Singing Telegram Company, the Bobs pave their own path through vocal pyrotechnics, witty tunes, musical brinkmanship, and amazing live shows. The band evolves and changes as they gain an audience, get nominated for a Grammy, tour the world, and manage to thrive for 25 years with no major label support, no hit records, and no instruments.

=== 2015 ===
- A Sort of Homecoming: Tells the story of Amy, a New York news producer who thought she left her high school experiences long in the past. She unexpectedly returns to Louisiana at the request of her high school debate coach. Their strained reunion brings back memories of her tumultuous senior year of high school. Through a series of flashbacks, we follow young Amy and her debate partner Nick on the highly competitive national debate circuit as they meet compatriots and competitors from top high schools around the country and the college coaches who control access to valuable scholarships.

=== 2018 ===
- For the Love of George: Quirky comedy about a jilted wife who leaves her cheating husband in England and sets off to LA hoping to meet who she believes is the perfect man - George Clooney.
- Good Eggs (TV Series short): A woman (Bethany Joy Lenz) who finally feels settled in life and her relationship finds she may be not be as content as she thought after an ex-boyfriend requests one of her frozen eggs.
- Old Guy (Short): OLD GUY is a comedic short take on the stereotyped image of aging in the media, starring Maria's father, Roger Burton (Tonight Show with Jay Leno) and Peri Gilpin (Frasier).

=== 2020 ===
Old Guy: 2020 Emmy Qualifying Streaming Short Form Series starring Peri Gilpin and Roger Burton.

=== 2022 ===
Kat's Coasters: directed by Maria Burton from a script by Berkley Johnson premiering at the Messhall Film Festival November, 2022.

== Other work ==
She produced Julia Sweeney's film Letting Go of God and The Happiest Day of His Life (2007). She has lectured on filmmaking at USC and AFI. Other work includes the short film Stephen Kanner: A Retrospective, as well as commercials for Ford Motor Company. Burton was selected for Indigenous Media's ProjectHER for which she wrote and directed Good Eggs for Condé Nast, and has been selected for the television directing programs including CBS Directors' Initiative Class of 2017–18, Ryan Murphy's HALF Initiative 2018, SONY's Emerging Directors Class 2018-20; ABC's Television Directing Class 2018-20 and DGA's DDI Emerging Directors Class 2021

=== Future projects ===
Maria is in process of developing an indie TV pilot, "MidLife", and next feature-film script for a drama inspired by the "Mercury 13 women who were tested for the original astronaut program in 1961–62 was named to the Athena Film Festival's Athena List and was a quarter finalist in the Academy of Motion Pictures's Nicholl Fellowship in Screenwriting.

Burton is also involved in the Sony's Diversity Directing Program 2018-19 and ABC/Disney's Class of 2018–20, She was one of 15 people to be selected to participate in this two-year program that offers professional development.

== Advocacy ==
Burton is co-chair of the Women's Steering Committee of the Directors Guild of America, a member of the emeritus board of The Alliance of Women Directors and an advisory board member of Global Girl Media.
