= Gabrielle Burton =

American novelist

- Born: Gabrielle Diane Bridget Baker; February 21, 1939 Lansing, Michigan, U.S.
- Died: September 3, 2015 (aged 76) Venice, California, U.S.
- Occupation: Novelist, screenwriter
- Education: Marygrove College (BA); American Film Institute (MFA)
- Spouse: Roger Burton
- Children: 5

Gabrielle Burton (born Gabrielle Diane Bridget Baker; February 21, 1939 – September 3, 2015) was an American feminist novelist and screenwriter.

== Biography ==
She was born in Lansing, Michigan to Clifford and Helen (née Dailey) Baker. She attended Marygrove College and then the American Film Institute at age 56. She was awarded AFI's Mary Pickford Prize for top screenplay.

Her best-known novels were I’m Running Away From Home but I’m Not Allowed to Cross the Street: A Primer of Women’s Liberation, Heartbreak Hotel, Impatient With Desire and Searching for Tamsen Donner. Burton was awarded a Nicholl Fellowship in 2000 for her screenplay The Imperial Waltz.

An early feminist in second wave feminism, Burton traveled with Gloria Steinem to talk about her experience as a mother of five daughters (film director Maria Burton, film producer Jennifer Burton, actor/director Ursula Burton, director/writer Gabrielle C. Burton, and producer and teacher Charity Burton); she and her husband Roger Burton would speak as a couple to crowds or in living room intimate settings among neighbors about the impact of working for equality for men and women, and how this would help family dynamics.

Burton studied psychology at Marygrove College, the first in her family to go to college. She then became a missionary in Barbados for a year, followed by moving to Washington D.C. to become a teacher. Her husband joined the NIMH (National Institute for Mental Health) as a researcher of child development, after his work in Europe with Jean Piaget; his best-known contribution is in the field of children and the development of morality. Gabrielle Burton's understanding of psychology research created a solid team as a couple which influenced their decision to move to Buffalo, New York to actively pursue raising children as a parenting team.

In 2002, she wrote the screen play for Manna from Heaven.

Upon her death, Gabrielle Burton was included in the Academy of Motion Pictures "In Memoriam" for the Oscars.

== Death ==
Gabrielle Baker Burton died of pancreatic cancer in Venice, California on September 3, 2015, aged 76. At the time of her death, she had been working on a book called Don't Sit Down Yet.

== Publications ==
- I’m Running Away From Home but I’m Not Allowed to Cross the Street: A Primer of Women’s Liberation (1972)
- Heartbreak Hotel (1986)
- Searching for Tamsen Donner (2009)
- Impatient With Desire (2010)
