= List of stage names: M =

This list of stage names lists names used by those in the entertainment industry, alphabetically by their stage name's surname (or the best approximation) followed by the given name (or the best approximation) where the surname begins with "M". One-word stage names are presented in List of one-word stage names.

Stage name	Birth name	Life	Notability	Notes
Agent M	Emily Grace Whitehurst	1979–	American singer, songwriter, composer, musician and producer (Tsunami Bomb)	
Lisa M	Mary Lisa Marrero Vázquez	1974–	Puerto Rican rapper	
Remy Ma	Reminisce Kioni Smith	1980–	American rapper	
Wu Ma	Feng Hongyuan	1942–2014	Hong Kong actor and director	
Edo Maajka	Edin Osmić	1978–	Bosnian rapper	
Moms Mabley	Loretta Mary Aiken	1894–1975	American comedian and actress	
Bernie Mac	Bernard Jeffrey McCullough	1957–2008	American comedian and actor	
Micheál Mac Liammóir	Alfred Lee Willmore	1899–1978	Anglo-Irish actor, author, designer, dramatist and impresario	
Ewan MacColl	James Miller	1915–1989	Scottish singer	
Harry MacDonough	John Macdonald	1871–1931	Canadian singer and recording executive	
Moyna Macgill	Charlotte Lillian McIldowie	1895–1975	British actress	
Tormod MacGill-Eain	Norman Maclean	1936–2017	Scottish comedian, novelist, poet, musician and broadcaster	
Byron MacGregor	Gary Lachlan Mack	1948–1995	Canadian radio and TV news anchor, news director and recording artist	
Cecil Mack	Richard Cecil McPherson	1873–1944	American musician	
Helen Mack	Helen McDougall	1913–1986	American actress	
Kelley Mack	Kelley Klebenow	1992–2025	American actress	
Lee Mack	Lee McKillop	1968–	English comedian and actor	
Lonnie Mack	Lonnie McIntosh	1941–2016	American musician	
Parker Mack	Parker Klebenow	Unknown	American actor	
Ted Mack	William Edward Maguiness	1904–1976	American radio and television host	
Willard Mack	Charles McLaughlin	1873–1934	American actor	
Gisèle MacKenzie	Gisèle LaFlèche	1927–2003	Canadian-American singer and actress	
Mary MacLaren	Mary MacDonald (or McDonald)	1900–1985	American actress	
Gavin MacLeod	Allan See	1931–2021	American actor	
Bill Macy	Wolf Garber	1922–2019	American actor	
Cleo Madison	Lulu Bailey	1883–1964	American actress	
Guy Madison	Robert Ozell Moseley	1922–1996	American actor	
Holly Madison	Holly Cullen	1979–	American television personality	
Noel Madison	Noel Moscovitch	1897–1975	American character actor	
Sarah Danielle Madison	Sarah Goldberg	1974–2014	American actress	
Philip Madoc	Philip Arvon Jones	1934–2012	Welsh actor	
Mickey Mae	Mickey Mae Faerch	1956–	Danish-Canadian burlesque dancer and actress	Also known as Yung Mae
Johnny Maestro	John Peter Mastrangelo	1939–2010	American singer (The Crests)	
Stella Maeve	Stella Maeve Johnson	1989–	American actress	
Brandon Maggart	Roscoe Maggart Jr.	1933–	American actor, painter and author	
Mary Maguire	Ellen Theresa Maguire	1919–1974	Australian-born actress	
Taj Mahal	Henry St. Claire Fredericks Jr.	1942–	American musician	
Franca Maï	Françoise Baud	1959–2012	French actress and novelist	
Marjorie Main	Mary Tomlinson	1890–1975	American character actress	
Lee Majors	Harvey Lee Yeary Jr.	1939–	American actor	
Dionysis Makris	Dionysis Sindrivanis	1982–	Greek actor	
Karl Malden	Mladen Sekulovich	1912–2009	American actor	
Eva Maler	Eva Litzenberg	1988–	German playwright	
Hema Malini	Hema Chakravarty	1948–	Indian actress, director, producer and politician	
Max Malini	Max Katz Breit	1875–1942	Polish-American magician	
Julia Mallam	Julia Oglesby	1982–	English actress	
Anna Malle	Anna Hotop	1967–2006	American actress	
Mathilde Mallinger	Mathilde Licthenegger	1847–1920	Croatian opera singer	
Victoria Mallory	Victoria Morales	1948–2014	American actress	
Yngwie Malmsteen	Lars Johan Yngve Lannerbäck	1963–	Swedish musician (Steeler and Alcatrazz)	
Dorothy Malone	Mary Maloney	1924–2018	American actress	
Nancy Malone	Ann Josefa Maloney	1935–2014	American actress and director	
Post Malone	Austin Richard Post	1995–	American musician and record producer	
Roy Maloy	Roy Timothy McPherson	1975–	Australian stunt performer	
Eily Malyon	Eily Lees-Craston	1879–1961	English character actress	
Lil Mama	Niatia Kirkland	1989–	American rapper	
Cheb Mami	Mohamed Kelifati	1966–	Algerian musician and singer-songwriter	
Beenie Man	Moses Davis	1973–	Jamaican deejay	
House Man	Theryl DeClouet	1951–2018	American singer	
Method Man	Clifford Smith Jr.	1971–	American rapper	
Rag'n'Bone Man	Rory Charles Graham	1985–	English singer	
Gucci Mane	Radric Delantic Davis	1980–	American rapper	
Gina Manès	Blanche Moulin	1893–1989	French actress	
Aasif Mandvi	Aasif Mandviwala	1966–	British and American actor, comedian and author	
Handsome Dick Manitoba	Richard Blum	1954–	American musician and radio personality (MC5)	
Abby Mann	Abraham Goodman	1927–2008	American writer and producer	
Anthony Mann	Emil Anton Bundmann	1906–1967	American actor	
Barry Mann	Barry Ibermann	1939–	American musician and songwriter	
Hank Mann	David Lieberman	1887–1971	Russian-American comedian and silent screen star	
Herbie Mann	Herbert Solomon	1930–2003	American jazz musician	
Manfred Mann	Manfred Lubowitz	1940–	South African-English musician, arranger, singer and songwriter (Manfred Mann)	
Mary Mannering	Florence Friend	1876–1953	English actress	
Dick Manning	Samuel Medoff	1912–1991	Russian-American songwriter	
Irene Manning	Inez Harvuot	1912–2004	American actress and singer	
Jayne Mansfield	Vera Jane Palmer	1933–1967	American actress	
Sally Mansfield	Marie Mahder	1923–2001	American character actress	
Marilyn Manson	Brian Hugh Warner	1969–	American musician (Marilyn Manson)	Stage name comes from the combination of American actress Marilyn Monroe and cult leader Charles Manson
Paul Mantee	Paul Marianetti	1931–2013	American actor	
Kurtis Mantronik	Graham Curtis el Khaleel	1965–	Jamaican-born hip hop and electronic musician (Mantronix)	
Víctor Manuelle	Víctor Manuel Ruiz	1968–	American musician	
Roots Manuva	Rodney Hylton Smith	1972–	English rapper	
Adele Mara	Adelaide Delgado	1923–2010	American actress	
Patricia Marand	Patricia Marandino	1934–2008	American actress and singer	
André Maranne	André Maillol	1926–2021	French-English actor	
Sophie Marceau	Sophie Maupu	1966–	French actress	
Kee Marcello	Kjell Lövbom	1960–	Swedish musician (Europe and Easy Action)	
Elspeth March	Jean Elspeth Mackenzie	1911–1999	English actress	
Fredric March	Ernest Frederick McIntyre Bickel	1897–1975	American actor	
Hal March	Harold Mendelson	1920–1970	American comedian, actor and television host	
Jane March	Jane March Horwood	1973–	English actress	
Peggy March	Margaret Battavio	1948–	American singer	
Bobby Marchan	Oscar Gibson	1930–1999	American singer, songwriter and bandleader	
Rocky Marciano	Rocco Marchegiano	1923–1969	American boxer	
Gian Marco	Gian Marco Zignago-Alcovér	1970–	Peruvian musician and actor	
James Marcus	Brian Terence James	1942–2020	English actor	
Jerry Maren	Gerard Marenghi	1920–2018	American actor	
La Mari	María del Mar Rodríguez Carnero	1975–	Spanish singer (Chambao)	
Angela Maria	Abelim Maria da Cunha	1929–2018	Brazilian singer and actress	
Angélica María	Angelia Hartman	1944–	Mexican actress and singer	
Ida Maria	Ida Maria Børli Sivertsen	1984–	Norwegian musician and songwriter	
Julienne Marie	Julianne Marie Hendricks	1937–	American former actress and singer	
Kelly Marie	Jacqueline McKinnon	1957–	Scottish singer	
Lisa Marie	Lisa Marie Smith	1968–	American model and actress	
Rose Marie	Rose Marie Mazzetta	1923–2017	American actress, singer and comedienne	
Teena Marie	Mary Christine Brockert	1956–2010	American singer, songwriter, musician and composer	
Gloria Marín	Gloria Méndez-Ramos	1919–1983	Mexican actress	
Anya Marina	Anya Kroth	1976–	American singer-songwriter	
Giovanna Marini	Giovanna Salviucci	1937–	Italian singer-songwriter	
Mona Maris	Mona María Emita Capdevielle or María Rosa Amita Capdevielle (disputed)	1903–1991	Argentine actress	
Sari Maritza	Dora Patricia Nathan	1910–1987	British-American actress	
Léo Marjane	Thérèse Gendebien	1912–2016	French singer	
Money Mark	Mark Ramos-Nishita	1960–	American producer and musician	
Biz Markie	Marcel Hall	1964–2021	American rapper and singer	
Al Markim	Alfred Moskowitz	1927–2015	American actor	
Alicia Markova	Lilian Alicia Marks	1910–2004	English ballerina and choreographer	
Alfred Marks	Ruchel Kutchinsky	1921–1996	English actor and comedian	
DJ Marky	Marco Silva	1973–	Brazilian DJ and producer	
Marley Marl	Marlon Williams	1962–	American rapper, DJ and record producer	
Naira Marley	Azeez Adeshina Fashola	1991–	British-Nigerian singer and songwriter	
Hugh Marlowe	Hugh Herbert Hipple	1911–1982	American actor	
Julia Marlowe	Sarah Frances Frost	1865–1950	English-American actress	
June Marlowe	Gisela Valaria Goetten	1903–1984	American actress	
Katherine Marlowe	Kathryn Irene Rea	1914–2010	American actress	
Marion Marlowe	Marion Townsend	1929–2012	American singer and actress	
Scott Marlowe	Ronald DeLeo	1932–2001	American actor	
Anna Marly	Anna Betulinskaya	1917–2006	Russian singer-songwriter	
Hanna Maron	Hanna Meierzak	1923–2014	German-Israeli actress and comedienne	
Johnny Marr	John Martin Maher	1963–	British-born Irish musician, singer and songwriter	
Sally Marr	Sadie Kitchenberg	1906–1997	American comedienne	
Albert Marre	Albert Moshinsky	1924–2012	American director and producer	
Baldo Marro	Teodoro Baldomaro	1948–2017	Filipino actor, screenwriter, director and producer	
Bruno Mars	Peter Gene Hernandez	1985–	American singer-songwriter	
Mick Mars	Robert Alan Deal	1951–	American musician (Mötley Crüe)	
Carol Marsh	Norma Lilian Simpson	1926–2010	English actress	
Garry Marsh	Leslie Marsh Geraghty	1902–1981	English actor	
Joan Marsh	Dorothy Rosher	1914–2000	American actress	
Marian Marsh	Violet Ethelred Krauth	1913–2006	American actress	
Alan Marshal	Alan Marshal Willey	1909–1961	Australian actor	
Anthony Wallace Marshall	Antonio Masciarelli	1906–1999	American film director and television producer	
Brenda Marshall	Ardis Ankerson	1915–1992	American actress	
Marion Marshall	Marian Le Priel Tanner	1929–2018	American actress	
Peter Marshall	Ralph Pierre LaCock	1926–2024	American television host, singer and actor	
Tully Marshall	William Phillips	1864–1943	American actor	
Arlene Martel	Arline Greta Sax	1936–2014	American actress	Also known as Arlene Sax
Lena Martell	Helen Thomson	1940–	Scottish singer	
Dean Martin	Dino Crocetti	1917–1995	American actor, singer and comedian	
Derek Martin	Derek Rapp	1933–2026	English actor	
Judy Martin	Eva Overstake	1917–1951	American country singer	
Kiel Martin	Kiel Mueller	1944–1990	American actor	
Lori Martin	Dawn Menzer	1947–2010	American actress	
Marion Martin	Marion Suplee	1909–1985	American actress	
Quinn Martin	Irwin Martin Cohn	1922–1987	American producer	
Ross Martin	Martin Rosenblatt	1920–1981	American actor	
Tony Martin	Anthony Harford	1957–	English singer (Black Sabbath)	
Tony Martin	Alvin Morris	1913–2012	American actor and singer	
Vince Martin	Vincent Markesteijn	1955–	Dutch-Australian actor and singer	
Elsa Martinelli	Elisa Tia	1935–2017	Italian actress and model	
India Martínez	Jenifer Yésica Martínez Fernández	1985–	Spanish singer	
Mia Martini	Domenica Berté	1947–1995	Italian singer, songwriter and musician	
Al Martino	Alfred Cini	1927–2009	American actor and singer	
John Martyn	Iain McGeachy	1948–2009	English-Scottish singer-songwriter and musician	
Laurel Martyn	Laurel Gill	1916–2013	Australian ballet dancer	
Hank Marvin	Brian Rankin	1941–	English musician (The Shadows)	
Pepper MaShay	Jean McClain	1953–	American singer-songwriter	
Osa Massen	Aase Madsen Iversen	1914–2006	Danish actress	
Edith Massey	Edith Dornfeld	1918–1984	American actress	
Ilona Massey	Ilona Hajmássy	1910–1974	Hungarian-American actress	
Sammy Masters	Samuel T. Lawmaster	1930–2013	American musician	
Keiko Masuda	Keiko Kobayashi	1957–	Japanese singer (Pink Lady)	
Jackie Mason	Yacov Maza	1928–2021	American comedian and actor	
Jessy Matador	Jessy Kimbangi	1983–	French-Congolese singer	
Maysa Matarazzo	Maysa Figueira Monjardim	1936–1977	Brazilian singer	
Carole Mathews	Jean Deifel	1920–2014	American actress	
June Mathis	June Hughes	1887–1927	American screenwriter	
Ana Matronic	Ana Lynch	1974–	American singer	
Ian Matthews	Ian Matthew McDonald	1946–	English musician and singer-songwriter (Fairport Convention)	
Lisa Matthews	Lisa Reich	1969–	American model	
Monica Maughan	Monica Cresswell Wood	1933–2010	Australian actress	
Max Maven	Philip Goldstein	1950–2022	American magician	
Joey Maxim	Giuseppe Antonio Berardinelli	1922–2001	American professional boxer	
Joe May	Joseph Otto Mandl	1880–1954	Austrian film director	
Mathilda May	Karen Haïm	1965–	French actress	
Luna Maya	Luna Maya Sugeng	1983–	Indonesian model and actress	
Marilyn Maye	Marilyn McLaughlin	1928–	American singer and actress	
Mitzi Mayfair	Juanita Emylyn Pique	1914–1976	American actress	
Gypie Mayo	John Philip Cawthra	1951–2013	English musician and songwriter (Dr. Feelgood)	
Virginia Mayo	Virginia Clara Jones	1920–2005	American actress	
Young Mazino	Christopher Young Kim	1991–	American actor	
Paul Mazursky	Irwin Mazursky	1930–2014	American film director, screenwriter and actor	
Young MC	Marvin Young	1967–	English-American rapper	
George McAnthony	Georg Spitaler	1966–2011	Italian singer-songwriter	
Billy McColl	William Collins	1951–2014	Scottish actor	
Kent McCord	Kent Franklin McWhirter	1942–	American actor	
Sylvester McCoy	Percy Kent-Smith	1943–	Scottish actor	
Marie McDonald	Cora Marie Frye	1923–1965	American actress and singer	
Jack McDuff	Eugene McDuffy	1926–2001	American jazz musician and bandleader	
Darren McGavin	William Richardson	1922–2006	American actor	
Mike McGear	Peter Michael McCartney	1944–	English musician and photographer (The Scaffold)	
Kitty McGeever	Catherine Mitchell	1966–2015	English actress and comedienne	
Charles McGraw	Charles Butters	1914–1980	American actor	
Goldy McJohn	John Goadsby	1945–2017	Canadian musician (Steppenwolf)	
Fay McKay	Fayetta Gelinas	1930–2008	American musician	
Scott McKenzie	Philip Blondheim	1939–2012	American singer-songwriter	
Kate McKinnon	Kathryn McKinnon Berthold	1984–	American actress and comedienne	
David McLean	Eugene Huth	1922–1995	American actor	
Christine McVie	Christine Perfect	1943–2022	English singer-songwriter and musician (Fleetwood Mac)	
So Me	Bertrand de Langeron	Unknown	French graphic designer, animator, director and music producer	
Audrey Meadows	Audrey Cotter	1922–1996	American actress	
Jayne Meadows	Jane Cotter	1919–2015	American actress	
Joyce Meadows	Joyce Johanna Burger	1933 (some sources cite 1935)	Canadian-born American actress	
Raya Meddine	Rana Alamuddin	1972–	Lebanese-American actress	
Kay Medford	Margaret Kathleen Regan	1916–1980	American actress	
Ralph Meeker	Ralph Rathgeber	1920–1988	American actor	
Mystic Meg	Margaret Anne Lake	1942–2023	English astrologer	
Eddie Mekka	Rudolph Edward Mekjian	1952–2021	American actor	
Melle Mel	Melvin Glover	1961–	American rapper (Grandmaster Flash and the Furious Five)	
George Melachrino	George Miltiades	1909–1965	English musician and composer	
Nellie Melba	Helen Mitchell	1861–1931	Australian opera singer	
Jack Melford	John Kenneth George Melford Smith	1899–1972	English actor	
Marisa Mell	Marlies Moitzi	1939–1992	Austrian actress	
Raquel Meller	Francesca Marqués-Lópes	1888–1962	Spanish singer	
Big Mello	Curtis Davis	1968–2002	American rapper	
Larry "Bud" Melman	Calvert DeForest	1921–2007	American actor and comedian	
Luiz Melodia	Luiz dos Santos	1951–2017	Brazilian musician	
Ms. Melodie	Ramona Scott	1969–2012	American rapper	
Silvy Melody	Silvy De Bie	1981–	Belgian singer (Sylver)	
Sid Melton	Sidney Meltzer	1917–2011	American actor	
Marie Menken	Marie Menkevicius	1909–1970	American filmmaker	
Vic Mensa	Victor Kwesi Mensah	1993–	American rapper	
Doro Merande	Dora Matthews	1892–1975	American actress	
José Mercé	José Soto Soto	1955–	Spanish flamenco singer	
Vivien Merchant	Ada Thompson	1929–1982	English actress	
Melina Mercouri	Maria Amalia Mercouris	1920–1994	Greek actress, singer, activist and politician	
Freddie Mercury	Farrokh Bulsara	1946–1991	British singer and songwriter (Queen)	
Lee Meredith	Judith Lee Sauls	1947–	American actress	
Bess Meredyth	Helen Elizabeth MacGlashen	1890–1969	American screenwriter and actress	
Tita Merello	Laura Merelli	1904–2002	Argentine actress and singer	
Yolanda Mérida	Yolanda Alpuche-Morales	1929–2012	Mexican actress	
Jan Merlin	Jan Wasylewski	1925–2019	American character actor	
Ethel Merman	Ethel Zimmermann	1908–1984	American actress and singer	
David Merrick	David Margulois	1911–2000	American theatrical producer	
Lynn Merrick	Marilyn Lleweling	1919–2007	American actress	
Dina Merrill	Nedenia Hutton	1923–2017	American actress	
Helen Merrill	Jelena Milcetic	1929–	American jazz singer	
Robert Merrill	Moishe Miller	1917–2004	American singer and actor	
Paul Merton	Paul James Martin	1957–	English comedian	
William Mervyn	William Mervyn Pickwoad	1912–1976	English actor	
Eddie Mesa	Eduardo Eigenmann	1940–	Filipino actor and singer	
Surf Mesa	Powell Aguirre	2000–	American electronic musician	
Peter Messaline	Peter John Burrell	1944–2016	English-Canadian actor	
Harry Meyen	Harald Haubenstock	1924–1979	German actor	
Ángela Meyer	Angela Maurano	1947–	Puerto Rican actress, comedienne, producer and politician	
Vsevolod Meyerhold	Karl Meiergold	1874–1940	Russian director	
Yung Miami	Caresha Brownlee	1994–	American rapper	
George Michael	Georgios Panayiotou	1963–2016	English singer, songwriter and producer (Wham!)	
Ralph Michael	Ralph Champion Shotter	1907–1994	English actor	
Ras Michael	Michael George Henry	1943–	Jamaican singer	
Bret Michaels	Bret Michael Sychak	1963–	American musician and singer (Poison)	
Frankie Michaels	Francis Michael Chernesky	1955–2016	American actor and singer	
Marilyn Michaels	Marilyn Sternberg	1943–	American comedienne, singer and actress	
Tammy Lynn Michaels	Tammy Lynn Doring	1974–	American actress	
Chrisette Michele	Chrisette Michele Payne	1982–	American singer	
Lea Michele	Lea Michele Sarfati	1986–	American actress, singer and songwriter	
Michael Michele	Michael Michele Williams	1966–	American actress	
Donna Michelle	Donna Michelle Ronne	1945–2004	American model, actress and photographer	
Janee Michelle	Geneva Mercadel	1946–	American actress, former model and dancer	
Guy Middleton	Guy Middleton Powell	1907–1973	English character actor	
Johnny Midnight	John Joseph Jr.	1941–2014	Filipino broadcaster	
Luis Miguel	Luis Miguel Gallego-Basteri	1970–	Puerto Rican-Mexican singer	
Dik Mik	Michael Davies	1943–2017	English musician (Hawkwind)	
Killer Mike	Michael Render	1975–	American rapper	
Wonder Mike	Michael Wright	1957–	American hip hop artist	
George Mikell	Jurgis Mikelaitis	1929–2020	Lithuanian-Australian actor and writer	
Ted V. Mikels	Theodore Vincent Mikacevich	1929–2016	American filmmaker	
Young Miko	María Victoria Ramírez de Arellano Cardona	1997–	Puerto Rican rapper, singer and songwriter	
Garry Miles	James Cason	1939–	American singer, songwriter, record producer and author	
Robert Miles	Roberto Concina	1969–2017	Swiss-Italian record producer	
Lewis Milestone	Lev Milstein	1895–1980	American director	
Tomas Milian	Tomás Quintín Rodríguez	1933–2017	Cuban-American actor and singer	
Meek Mill	Robert Williams	1987–	American rapper	
Victor Millan	Joseph Brown	1920–2009	American actor	
Ray Milland	Reginald Truscott-Jones	1907–1986	Welsh-American actor and director	
Mary Millar	Irene Wetton	1936–1998	English actress and singer	
Achi Miller	Prince Achileas-Andreas of Greece and Denmark	2000–	Greek actor	
Ann Miller	Johnnie Lucille Collier	1923–2004	American actress and dancer	
Eve Miller	Eve Turner	1923–1973	American actress	
Kristine Miller	Jacqueline Eskesen	1925–2015	American actress	
Mac Miller	Malcolm McCormick	1992–2018	American rapper and record producer	
Marilyn Miller	Mary Ellen Reynolds	1898–1936	American actress, singer and dancer	
Martin Miller	Rudolph Muller	1899–1969	Czech-Austrian character actor	
Mick Miller	Michael Lawton	1950–	English stand-up comedian	
Lucky Millinder	Lucius Venables	1910–1966	American bandleader	
Bird Millman	Jennadean Englemann	1890–1940	American circus performer	
Donna Mills	Donna Jean Miller	1940–	American actress	
Florence Mills	Florence Winfrey	1896–1927	American singer, dancer and comedienne	
Milos Milos	Miloš Milošević	1941–1966	Serbian-American actor	
Garnet Mimms	Garrett Mimms	1933–	American singer	
Ara Mina	Hazel Klenk-Reyes	1979–	Filipina actress and singer	
Nicki Minaj	Onika Maraj	1982–	Trinidadian rapper, singer, songwriter and actress	
Mike Minor	Michael Fedderson	1940–2016	American actor	
Alexis Minotis	Alexis Minotakis	1900–1990	Greek actor and director	
Mary Miles Minter	Juliet Reilly	1902–1984	American actress	
Ela Minus	Gabriela Jimeno Caldas	1990–	Colombian singer-songwriter, multi-instrumentalist and producer	
Percy Miracles	Phonte Coleman	1978–	American rapper, singer and producer	Stage name for R&B output
Isa Miranda	Ines Isabella Sampietro	1909–1982	Italian actress	
Soledad Miranda	Soledad Rendón-Bueno	1943–1970	Spanish actress and singer	
Father John Misty	Joshua Tillman	1981–	American musician (Fleet Foxes)	
Duke Mitchell	Dominic Miceli	1926–1981	American actor	
Frank Mitchell	Francis McClorey	1963–	Northern Irish broadcaster	
Gordon Mitchell	Charles Allen Pendleton	1923–2003	American actor	
Guy Mitchell	Albert George Cernik	1927–1999	American singer and actor	
Joni Mitchell	Roberta Joan Anderson	1943–	Canadian-American musician	
Norman Mitchell	Norman Mitchell Driver	1918–2001	English actor	
Warren Mitchell	Warren Misell	1926–2015	English actor	
Akihiro Miwa	Shingo Maruyama	1935–	Japanese singer, actor, director, composer and author	
Mimi Miyagi	Melody Damayo	1973–	Filipina-American model and former pornographic actress	
Art Mix	George Kesterson	1896–1972	American actor	
Sir Mix-a-Lot	Anthony Ray	1963–	American rapper	
AC Mizal	Mizal Zaini	1971–	Malaysian actor, singer, comedian and television host	
Agnez Mo	Agnes Monica Muljoto	1986–	Indonesian singer	
Keb' Mo'	Kevin Moore	1951–	American musician and singer	
Mighty Mo	Siala-Mou Siliga	1970–	American Samoan former kickboxer	
Big Moe	Kenneth Moore	1974–2007	American rapper	
Mac Mohan	Mohan Makhijani	1938–2010	Indian actor	
Essra Mohawk	Sandra Elayne Hurvitz	1948–2023	American singer-songwriter	Also known as Sandy Hurvitz and Jamie Carter
Toro y Moi	Chazwick Bundick	1986–	American singer, songwriter, record producer and graphic designer	Also known as Chaz Bear, Les Sins and PLUM
Janelle Monáe	Janelle Monáe Robinson	1985–	American singer and actress	
Pierre Mondy	Pierre Cuq	1925–2012	French actor	
Eddie Money	Edward Mahoney	1949–2019	American musician	
Owen Money	Lynn Mittell	1947–	Welsh musician, actor, comedian and radio presenter	
Tony Monopoly	Antonio Monopoli	1944–1995	Australian singer	
Matt Monro	Terence Parsons	1930–1985	English singer	
Jordan Monroe	Emily Ranheim	1986–	American model	
Tami Monroe	Jessica Wells	1969/1970–	American actress	
Country Dick Montana	Daniel Monte McLain	1955–1995	American musician (The Beat Farmers)	
French Montana	Karim Kharbouch	1984–	Moroccan-American rapper	
Lenny Montana	Leonardo Passofaro	1926–1992	American actor	
Montie Montana	Owen Mickel	1910–1998	American actor	
Patsy Montana	Ruby Blevins	1908–1996	American country singer and songwriter	
Yves Montand	Ivo Livi	1921–1991	Italian-French actor and singer	
Alejandro Montaner	Alejandro Reglero Vaz	Unknown	Venezuelan singer	
Evaluna Montaner	Evaluna Mercedes Reglero Rodríguez de Echeverry	1997–	Venezuelan actress, singer, dancer and television presenter	
Ricardo Montaner	Héctor Eduardo Reglero Montaner	1957–	Argentine-Venezuelan singer	
Ricky Montaner	Ricardo Andrés Reglero Rodríguez	1990–	Venezuelan singer and songwriter (Mau & Ricky)	
Toni Montano	Velibor Miljković	1962–	Serbian musician	
Fernanda Montenegro	Arlette Pinheiro Esteves da Silva	1929–	Brazilian actress	
Mario Montenegro	Roger Macalalag	1928–1988	Filipino actor	
Elisa Montés	Elisa Rosario Ruiz Penella	1934–2024	Spanish actress	
Julia Montes	Mara Schnittka	1995–	Filipina actress	
Chris Montez	Ezekiel Christopher Montanez	1943–	American musician and singer	
Maria Montez	María Vidal de Santo Silas	1912–1951	Dominican actress	
Ricardo Montez	Levy Attias	1923–2010	English actor	
George Montgomery	George Montgomery Letz	1916–2000	American actor	
Carlotta Monti	Carlotta Montijo	1907–1993	American actress	
Sara Montiel	María Antonia Abad Fernández	1928–2013	Spanish actress and singer	
Mike Monty	Michael O'Donahue	1936–2006	American actor	
Ivan Moody	Ivan Greening	1980–	American singer and songwriter (Five Finger Death Punch)	
Ron Moody	Ronald Moodnick	1924–2015	English actor, composer, singer and writer	
Debra Mooney	Debra Vick	1947–	American character actress	
Lova Moor	Marie-Claude Jourdain	1946–	French dancer and singer	
Colleen Moore	Kathleen Morrison	1899–1988	American actress	
Garry Moore	Thomas Garrison Morfit	1915–1993	American entertainer	
Julianne Moore	Julie Anne Smith	1960–	American actress	
Melba Moore	Beatrice Melba Hill	1945–	American singer and actress	
Mickey Moore	Michael Sheffield	1914–2013	American director and child actor	
Stephen Campbell Moore	Stephen Moore Thorp	1979–	English actor	
Terry Moore	Helen Koford	1929–	American actress	
Natalie Moorhead	Nathalia Messner	1901–1992	American actress	
Vina Morales	Sharon Garcia Magdayao	1975–	Filipina actress and singer	
Eric Morecambe	John Eric Bartholomew	1926–1984	English comedian and actor (Morecambe and Wise)	
André Morell	Cecil André Mesritz	1909–1978	English actor	
Monica Morell	Monica Wirz-Römer	1953–2008	Swiss singer	
Rosa Morena	Manuela Pulgarín González	1940–2019	Spanish singer	
Antonio Moreno	Antonio Garrido Monteagudo	1887–1967	Spanish-American actor	
Rosita Moreno	Gabriela Viñolas	1907–1993	Spanish actress	
Camila Morgado	Camila Ribeiro da Silva	1975–	Brazilian actress	
Chesty Morgan	Ilana Wilczkowsky	1937–	Polish retired dancer	
Dennis Morgan	Earl Stanley Morner	1908–1994	American actor and singer	Previously used the acting pseudonym Richard Stanley
Frank Morgan	Francis Phillip Wuppermann	1890–1949	American character actor	
Gary Morgan	Gary Panasky	1950–	American actor	
Harry Morgan	Harry Bratsberg	1915–2011	American actor and director	
Helen Morgan	Helen Riggins	1900–1941	American singer and actress	
Henry Morgan	Henry Van Ost Jr.	1915–1994	American humorist, comedian and actor	
Jane Morgan	Florence Currier	1924–2025	American former singer	
Jaye P. Morgan	Mary Margaret Morgan	1931–	American singer and actress	
Lina Morgan	Maríá López Segovia	1937–2015	Spanish actress	
Michèle Morgan	Simone Roussel	1920–2016	French actress	
Ralph Morgan	Raphael Kuhner Wuppermann	1883–1956	American actor	
Shaun Morgan	Shaun Morgan Welgemoed	1978–	South African musician (Seether)	
Claudia Mori	Claudia Moroni	1944–	Italian producer, former actress and former singer	
Toshia Mori	Toshiye Ichioka	1912–1995	Japanese actress	
Pat Morita	Noriyuki Morita	1932–2005	Japanese-American actor	
Louisa Moritz	Luisa Castro Netto	1936–2019	Cuban-American actress and lawyer	
Karen Morley	Mildred Linton	1909–2003	American actress	
Oliver Morosco	Oliver Mitchell	1875–1945	American producer, director and writer	
Aubrey Morris	Aubrey Steinberg	1926–2015	English actor	
Wolfe Morris	Wolfe Steinberg	1925–1996	English actor (Aubrey's brother)	
James Morrison	James Catchpole	1984–	English singer-songwriter	
Lewis Morrison	Morris Morris	1844–1906	Jamaican-American actor	
Patricia Morrison	Patricia Rainone	1962–	American musician	
Shelley Morrison	Rachel Mitrani	1936–2019	American actress	
Bruce Morrow	Bruce Meyerowitz	1935–	American radio performer	
Buddy Morrow	Muni Zudekoff	1919–2010	American musician and bandleader	
Doretta Morrow	Doretta Marano	1927–1968	American actress	
Susan Morrow	Jacqueline Immoor	1932–1985	American actress	
Vic Morrow	Victor Morozoff	1929–1982	American actor	
Gary Morton	Morton Goldapper	1924–1999	American comedian	
Hugh Morton	Hugh Morton Eden	1903–1984	English actor	
James C. Morton	Thomas Richard Potts	1884–1942	American character actor	
Jelly Roll Morton	Ferdinand Joseph LaMothe (Note: Transcribed Lemott on what is believed to be his 1891 baptismal certificate.)	1890–1941	American musician, bandleader and composer	
Maurice Moscovich	Morris Maaskov	1871–1940	American actor	
Hans Moser	Johann Julier	1880–1964	Austrian actor	
Mickie Most	Michael Hayes	1938–2003	English record producer	
Iwa Moto	Aileen Iwamoto	1988–	Filipina actress and model	
Danger Mouse	Brian Joseph Burton	1977–	American musician (Gnarls Barkley)	
Alan Mowbray	Alfred Ernest Allen	1896–1969	English actor	
Patrick Mower	Patrick Archibald Shaw	1938–	English actor	
Stephen Moyer	Stephen John Emery	1969–	English actor	
DJ Muggs	Lawrence Muggerud	1968–	American DJ and producer (Cypress Hill)	
Jean Muir	Jean Muir Fullarton	1911–1996	American actress	
Paul Muni	Meshilem Weisenfreund	1895–1967	American actor	
Tommy Muñiz	Lucas Tomás Muñiz Ramírez	1922–2009	Puerto Rican actor, media producer, businessman and network owner	
Alex Munro	Alexander Neilson Horsburgh	1911–1986	Scottish actor and comedian	
Janet Munro	Janet Horsburgh	1934–1972	English actress	
Ona Munson	Ona Wolcott	1903–1955	American actress	
Jean-Louis Murat	Jean-Louis Bergheaud	1952–2023	French musician	
Alma Muriel	Alma Muriel del Sordo	1951–2014	Mexican actress	
F. W. Murnau	Friedrich Wilhelm Plumpe	1888–1931	German director	
Arthur Murray	Moses Teichman	1895–1991	American ballroom dancer	
Brian Murray	Brian Bell	1937–2018	South African actor and director	
Jan Murray	Murray Janofsky	1916–2006	American comedian and actor	
Ken Murray	Kenneth Doncourt	1903–1988	American comedian, actor and writer	
Lyn Murray	Lionel Breeze	1909–1989	English-American composer, conductor and arranger	
Mae Murray	Marie Koenig	1885–1965	American actress, director, film producer and screenwriter	
Junior Murvin	Murvin Junior Smith	1946–2013	Jamaican musician	
Ivar Must	Igor Tsõganov	1961–	Estonian composer and music producer	
Lothar Müthel	Lothar Max Lütcke	1896–1964	German actor and director	
Ornella Muti	Francesca Romana Rivelli	1955–	Italian actress	
Alannah Myles	Alannah Byles	1958–	Canadian singer-songwriter	
Meg Myles	Billie Jean Jones	1934–2019	American model, singer and actress	
Marie Myriam	Myriam Lopes	1957–	French singer	
Odette Myrtil	Odette Laure Clotilde Quignarde	1898–1978	French-American actress, singer and musician	
