= For the Love of George =

2018 comedy film

- Directed by: Maria Burton
- Screenplay by: Nadia Jordan and Hayley Nolan
- Story by: Nadia Jordan
- Produced by: Nadia Jordan
- Starring: Nadia Jordan; Rex Lee; Rosanna Arquette; Tate Donovan; Shaun Sipos; Kristen Johnston; Ruth Connell; Marina Sirtis
- Cinematography: Arlene Nelson
- Edited by: Simon Carmody; Libby Cuenin
- Music by: David Bertok
- Production company: Fluffy Cat Productions
- Distributed by: Vision Films
- Release dates: November 2017 (Chicago Comedy Film Festival); February 13, 2018
- Running time: 89 minutes
- Country: United States
- Language: English

For the Love of George is a 2017 comedy film produced by Nadia Jordan, directed by Maria Burton and written by Jordan and Hayley Nolan. Jordan also stars in the film alongside Rosanna Arquette, Tate Donovan, Rex Lee, Shaun Sipos and Kristen Johnston. The film tells the story of Poppy, a jilted wife who leaves her cheating husband in England and sets off to Los Angeles hoping to meet who she believes is the perfect man, George Clooney.

The film showed at the 2017 Chicago Comedy Film Festival, La Femme International Film Festival 2017, the 2017 Orlando Film Festival and the Saint Paul Frozen Film Festival 2018.

== Plot ==
The story begins in early 2014 in Surrey, England. Poppy Wakefield lives a charmed existence, playing domestic goddess for her husband Stephen and working as a freelance magazine journalist from her beautiful home. Her seemingly perfect, if predictable, life is shattered when she discovers that Stephen's recent birdwatching hobby is a cover for an affair.

For Stephen's birthday, Poppy has prepared a romantic evening, complete with expensive gifts, a specialty cake, a sexy teddy and rose petals scattered to the bedroom. He cancels with a call, implying he's going in search of a rare bird. However, he doesn't hang up properly, and she overhears him telling his lover how gullible she is.

Still in shock from the betrayal, Poppy finds some much needed respite in an entertainment talk show segment highlighting George Clooney's charitable work. To her, George is everything her husband isn't; suave, sophisticated, funny and charming, someone who really cares about making a difference in the world and the ideal match for her.

When she receives a well-timed invitation to visit her close friend Justin in Los Angeles, she drops everything and decides to give fate a helping hand by flying to LA. They got to know each other as he worked as their wedding planner.

Upon Justin's suggestion, Poppy starts seeing celebrity specialist Dr. Faye, who asks her about her George Clooney obsession. She resents the implication, then continues to go on about how perfect he is for her.

The next morning, as Poppy works on her latest article for Chit Chat magazine, Justin lures her out to the farmers' market in case George might show. There, a young vendor flirts with her, but she doesn't fall for his charms.

With a renewed plan to force a meeting with George, she buys an array of his tequilas, then contacts his publicist trying to set a meeting under the guise of writing an article. Then she drags Justin out to a bikers' bar, as she hears he's bought a Harley.

Deciding to extend her stay, Justin introduces Poppy to Marcy, a lonely southerner newlywed. Discovering that George is scheduled to attend Marcy's party, she spends days preparing, but through a comedy of errors, she misses him. Moping around Justin's for some days, his Russian cleaner Irina convinces her to see a psychic. A disaster, Poppy's commiserating in a bar when someone tries to get her into bed.

On Poppie's quest to cross paths with George, the surprise announcement of his engagement brings Poppy and her romantic fantasy crashing back down to earth. Justin almost kicks her out, but she promises to straighten out.

Poppy is pensative, watching the waves, when the flirty juice vendor jogs by. Luke and she embark on a light-hearted liaison, lasting days. It comes to a screeching halt when he surprises Poppy, after saying he wants to take it to the next level, suggesting they record themselves doing a three-way with Irina.

On Poppy's birthday she ends up drinking through the night with Justin, Marcy and Irina. Stephen shows up, telling her he'll take her back when she's ready. Unhappy with the lack of romanticism, she turns him away. Stephen returns with flowers and with a greater romantic gesture, but when she realises he wants things the same, she breaks it off definitively.

Offered to do a weekly TV segment in London, Poppy sits for photos on a luxurious hotel roof. Later, she waits for the elevator and, engrossed in her cell, she waves it off as it's not empty. Realising too late that George was inside, Poppy is unsuccessful in meeting him.

== Cast ==
- Nadia Jordan as Poppy
- Rex Lee as Justin
- Rosanna Arquette as Dr Faye
- Tate Donovan as Alvin Kooney
- Kristen Johnston as Psychic Sara
- Shaun Sipos as Luke
- Marina Sirtis as Sharon
- Henry Hereford as Stephen
- Petra Bryant as Irina
- Adrienne Whitney as Marcy
- Ruth Connell as Stacy
- Paul Provenza as Donny
- Ben Gleib as Lawrence
- Tracy Ransome as Ashley
- Sandro Monetti as Mario
- Ron S. Geffner as Newscaster

== Production ==
The film is produced by Fluffy Cat Productions Inc. A strong advocate of supporting women in the entertainment industry, producer Nadia Jordan enlisted a predominantly female crew. A portion of the profits from the film will be donated to the Enough Project charity, the main partner of Not On Our Watch (NOOW).

== Writing ==
Inspired by George Clooney and his humanitarian work, Jordan had the idea for the film after reading a book written by John Prendergast and Don Cheadle titled Not on Our Watch. The book details the history of Sudan and how the Darfur crisis evolved and urges readers to get involved and take action to raise awareness in various ways, including hosting a film screening. Clooney, in his capacity as co-founder of NOOW, channeled significant support to NOOW's main partner organization, Enough. At the time of concept Clooney was considered one of the most eligible bachelors in the world. According to Jordan this is what prompted her to come up with the story for the film, which was originally titled Looking for George Clooney.

== Soundtrack ==
The For the Love of George soundtrack was released in February 2018 and features artists Unsung Lilly, David Bertok, Lisa Brigantino, James Bowers, Dominique Pruitt and Alex-Louise.

== Release ==
For the Love of George is distributed by Vision Films.

== Accolades ==
For the Love of George was an Official Selection at the Chicago Comedy Film Festival 2017, La Femme International Film Festival 2017, the Orlando Film Festival 2017 and the Saint Paul Frozen Film Festival 2018. At the Chicago Comedy Film Festival, the film won the Audience Choice Award and Top Female Filmmaker Award (Nadia Jordan) and received three nominations at the Orlando Film Festival – Best Actress (Nadia Jordan), Best Supporting Performance (Kristen Johnston) and Best Trailer. It won the Best Comedy Feature Award at the Saint Paul Frozen Film Festival.
