= Geffner =

Geffner is a surname. Notable people with the surname include:

- Deborah Geffner (born 1952), American actress, singer, and dancer
- Glenn Geffner, American radio announcer
- Ron S. Geffner, American attorney
