= Dulce Compania =

- Formation: 2003
- Type: Theatre group
- Purpose: Stiltwalking
- Location: Berlin, Germany
- Artistic director(s): Marjorie Ibaceta Chau, Marko Bubke-Chau, Gonzalo Oyarzun Riveros
- Website: http://www.dulce-compania.com

Dulce Compania is a performance-theater company based in Berlin, Germany. The company was formed in 2003 by a Chilean, Marjorie Ibaceta Chau, and a German, Marko Bubke-Chau. In 2007, the Chilean Gonzalo Oyarzun Riveros joined the company. For international productions, the group is enlarged to include a pool of dancers and actors. In 2008, Dulce Compania received first place, and in 2010 second place in the German Karneval der Kulturen (Carnival of Cultures) in Berlin, which was attended by an audience of 1 million people.

The performance company places emphasis on stiltwalking. Dulce Compania makes use of a large repertoire of fantastical costumes. Additionally, Dulce Compania puts together larger and smaller show productions for various events.
