= Five Sisters Productions =

Five Sisters Productions is a production company helmed by the five Burton sisters, Maria Burton, Jennifer Burton, Ursula Burton, Gabrielle Burton and Charity Burton. Their films include Just Friends (1997), Temps (1999), Manna From Heaven (2002), Julia Sweeney's Letting Go of God (2008), Kings, Queens and In-Betweens (2017) and Good Eggs (2018). The New York Times called Manna From Heaven "a true outsider film," which is "refreshingly sincere, gentle and good-natured."
