= Gabrielle C. Burton =

American director, producer and actor

Gabrielle C. Burton is an American director, producer and actor best known for her film, Kings, Queens and In-Betweens, a 2017 documentary about gender as looked at through the lens of drag queens, kings, and transgender performers in Columbus, Ohio, which had its world premiere at the Cleveland International Film Festival. She often works with her sisters, Maria Burton, Jennifer Burton, Ursula Burton and Charity Burton through their Five Sisters Productions company. She wrote and starred in Temps, and co-directed Manna From Heaven. Burton won an artist residency from the Wexner Center for the Arts to make a new film, a documentary on gender and parenting called Drag Queens Made Me a Better Parent, inspired by her TEDx talk.
