= Petra Bryant =

Czech born actress and writer

- Born: Petra Štefanidesová
- Occupations: Actress, writer
- Years active: 2006–present

Petra Bryant (born Petra Štefanidesová) is a Czech-born British-American actress and writer.

== Career ==
She is known for a Los Angeles comedy For the Love of George. Bryant is also the writer and creator of the Girl on a Rocking Horse novel, as well as the TV series of the same name.

== Filmography ==
=== Film ===
Year	Film	Role	Notes
2007	Eastern Promises	Prostitute (uncredited)	
2018	For the Love of George	Irina	
2018	The Convent	Agnes	
2020	Come Away	Prostitute (uncredited)	

=== Television ===
Year	Film	Role	Notes
2006	Snuff Box	Wife of Rich Fulcher (uncredited)	Episode: "Oh Brothers"
2007	The Peter Serafinowicz Show	Zombie Chat (uncredited)	Episode #1.6
