= A Sort of Homecoming (film) =

2015 film by Maria Burton

- Official release poster
- Directed by: Maria Burton
- Written by: Lynn Reed
- Produced by: Marcus Lyle Brown; Yvette Marie Brown
- Starring: Michelle Clunie; Laura Marano; Parker Mack; Katherine McNamara; Kathleen Wilhoite
- Cinematography: Arlene Nelson
- Edited by: Lai-San Ho; Susan Vaill
- Music by: Andrew Morgan Smith
- Production companies: Believe Entertainment; Coming Home Productions
- Distributed by: MarVista Entertainment
- Release date: March 14, 2015
- Country: United States
- Language: English
- Budget: $3.4 million

A Sort of Homecoming is an American drama film directed by Maria Burton and starring Katherine McNamara, Laura Marano, Parker Mack, Michelle Clunie and Kathleen Wilhoite. It premiered March 14, 2015 at the Omaha Film Festival.

== Plot ==
The protagonist, Amy Hartington, returns to her home town in Louisiana from her career in New York City as a freelance news producer at CZN (a fictional cable news network) upon request of her high school debate coach, Annie Landry, who is dying and has named Amy her power of attorney. In flashbacks, she recalls her senior year, the politics surrounding debate competitions and her relationship with Nick (Parker Mack), her debate partner.

Upon arriving at Annie's house, Amy finds her bed-ridden and attended to by visiting nurses. That night, she drinks herself to sleep. Amy dreams of a party with a younger Annie and all her old classmates, but escorts a specific boy out. Upon waking up, Amy retells Annie the story of her summer debate camp 30 years ago.

Amy is an adopted child, and is frequently the target of pranks from her older siblings, as well as less than favorable treatment by her parents. She spends more time within her 1972 Pontiac Catalina coupe than her family home. At school, Annie assigns Nick Stayson as her partner. Nick is the star debater at the school, but while being sought out by the very cable news network that Amy works for today, he also has a tumultuous family life with an abusive father who works on an oil rig in the Gulf of Mexico. On their way to the debate camp, Amy and Nick bring money to his older sister, who is apparently a single mother, and later pick up a student at the airport from Stuyvesant High School in Brooklyn named Rosa Conti, who is also sent to help them.

While listening to Rosa make a speech, Amy becomes convinced that she is in over her head and flees. Later on, Rosa spots her on a bench and talks her into staying at the camp. Meanwhile, CZN News Reporter Bill Tarrity seeks to make a news report on High School Debate making Nick the star of his story, and the camp gives him a permission slip for his parents he knows his father will never sign. Under the guise of seeking research material, Nick and Amy flee the camp, and she talks him into a night on the town in New Orleans. During the night, they discuss their family situations, including an incident when Nick, his mother, and his sister went to the 1984 World's Fair, only to face an abusive tirade from his father back home.

Rosa's brother Dylan visits the camp, along with Susan Levine, a CZN producer working on Tarrity's impeding news story. Dylan is in the process of making a documentary about a man who discovers Cajun bluegrass music, after hearing a concert by Gatemouth Brown, and also takes a liking to Amy. After a speech by Rosa, Susan recruits Amy for some interviews on the structure of high school debate. As the report on Nick and his life on the debate team is about to begin, Nick's father arrives at the school with his mother in tow, brings the permission slip and burns it in front of him with a cigarette lighter. Nick flees the camp in embarrassment.

Returning from the debate camp, Amy finds that she's being coerced into going to her cousin's wedding and stumbles about a sealed envelope with her adoption information. Rather than going to the wedding, she drives to Annie's house, urging her to read the letter due to her own anxiety about the adoption. To help her deal with her anxiety, Annie tells Amy about a period in her life after the death of her son, during which she went on an emotional rollercoaster and took a trip to Valencia, where she discovered Falles and finally felt comfortable returning to school.

Annie sends Amy and Nick as representatives of their school for a competition in New York City, but due to school budget cuts, can't go with them. Upon their arrival, Rosa invites them to stay at her family's apartment, and Dylan takes Amy up onto the roof, but she resists his advances. Annie calls and informs them that Nick's father denied him permission to go on the trip, and urges Amy to bring Nick home, but she secretly refuses to do so. After the phone call, Nick offers to help Amy meet a woman who might be her birth mother, but she's nervous about the potential encounter. Amy and Nick got to Brooklyn and enter the bar in hopes of finding her mother, and she orders a beer. It seems like Amy and the bartender are about to realize their relationship with one another when the cheers of other bar patrons watching a football game startle Amy, and she runs away with Nick following her. Afterwards, the two discuss their future and their status, with Nick wanting to leave Louisiana. They passionately kiss and have sex.

Amy is now confident of victory after both her training and her night with Nick, until Nick unexpectedly flees the auditorium, never to return. Amy wins the debate without him and earns a scholarship. Returning to Lafayette, she finds that the school fired Annie due to Amy not returning with Nick when his father wanted them to. Annie feels betrayed and is disappointed in Amy. Amy drives home, but has second thoughts about the potential encounter with her parents and leaves home never to return.

The movie returns to the present day where Amy attends Annie's funeral with some of her former students. At work, she finally accepts a full-time contract with CZN. Returning to Lafayette, Amy finds an old postcard from India sent by Nick to Annie indicating he still thinks of Amy, and later returns to her old school as a new debate coach.

== Cast ==
- Michelle Clunie as Amy Hartington
  - Laura Marano as young Amy Hartington
- Parker Mack as Nick
- Katherine McNamara as Rosa Conti
- Kathleen Wilhoite as Annie
- Jaqueline Fleming as Val
- Lara Grice as Amy's mother
- Wayne Pére as Adam
- Ashlynn Ross as Melanie
- Shayne Topp as Dylan
- Morganna May as Susan Levine
- Lance E. Nichols as Hal
- Ritchie Montgomery as Amy's father
- Marcus Lyle Brown as Keith
- Jim Gleason as Bill Tarrity
- Neal Kodinsky as Victor

== Production ==
Production for the film began in February 2014 and spanned much of the spring of that year. While a few scenes were shot in New Orleans, the majority were shot in Lafayette, Louisiana, hometown of the writer and producers.

== Distribution ==
After playing film festivals for most of 2015, A Sort of Homecoming was released digitally in the United States by MarVista Entertainment. The movie was made available online in various sources in the United States on May 10, 2016. Laura Marano told Twist Magazine, "At the core of it, A Sort of Homecoming is about this character finding herself, not only with her support system, but within herself."

== Awards and nomination ==
| Year | Award | Category | Nominee | Result | Refs |
|---|---|---|---|---|---|
| 2012 | WorldFest Houston | Screenplay - Dramatic Original | Lynn Reed | Nominated | |
| 2015 | Downtown Film Festival Los Angeles | Best Director for Narrative Feature | Maria Burton | Won | |
| 2015 | Omaha Film Festival | Best Feature | Maria Burton & Lynn Reed | 2nd place | |
| 2015 | Remi Awards | Rising Actress | Laura Marano | Won | |
| 2015 | Breckenridge Festival of Film | Best Supporting Actress | Kathleen Wilhoite | Won | |
