= Namur stilt jousting =

Tradition of the city of Namur, Belgium

Stilt jousting
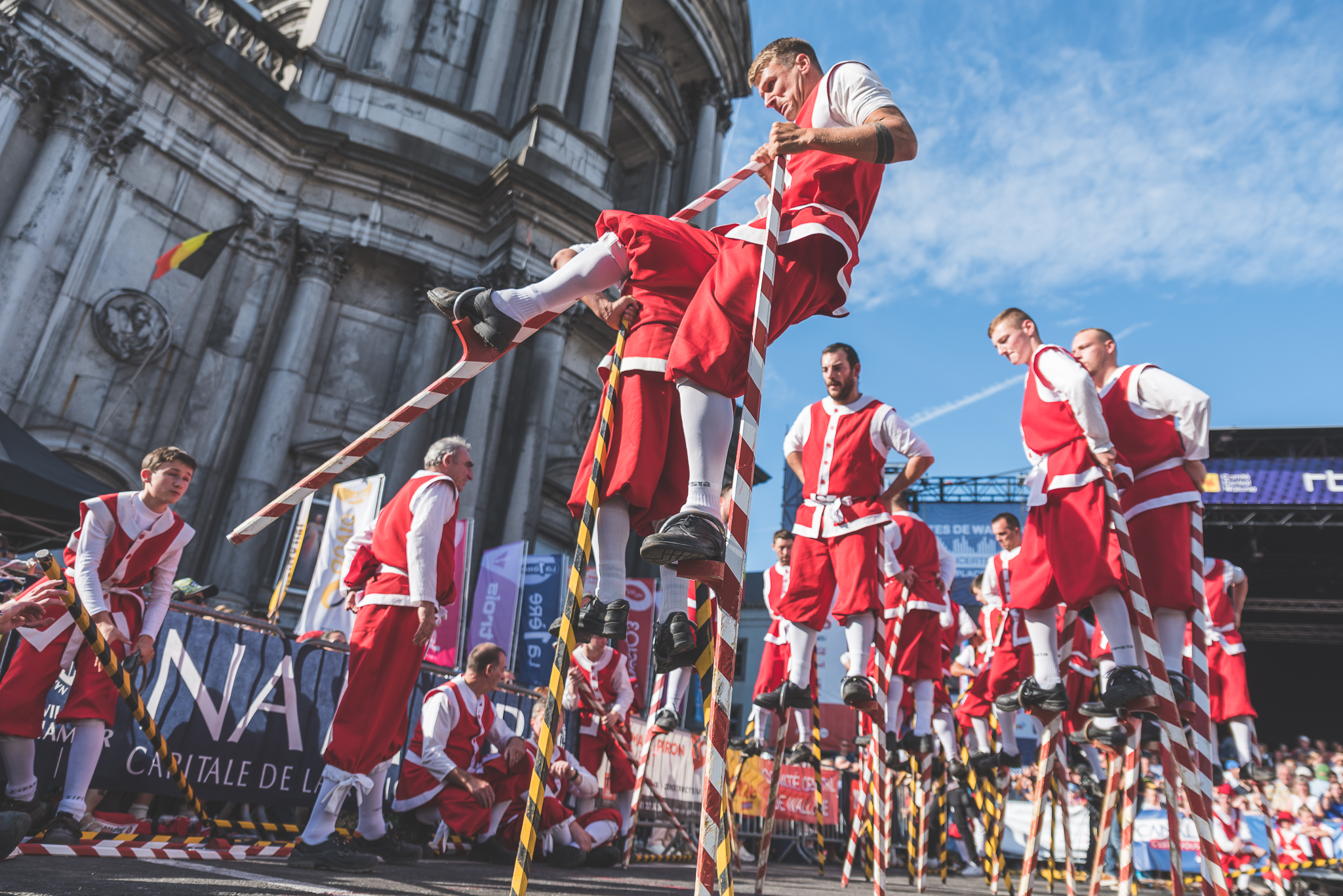
- Stilt jousters in Namur
- Frequency: Annual
- Locations: Namur, Belgium

Namur stilt jousting
- UNESCO Intangible Cultural Heritage
- Country: Belgium
- Reference: 01590
- Region: Europe and North America

Inscription history
- Inscription: 2021 (16th session)
- List: Representative

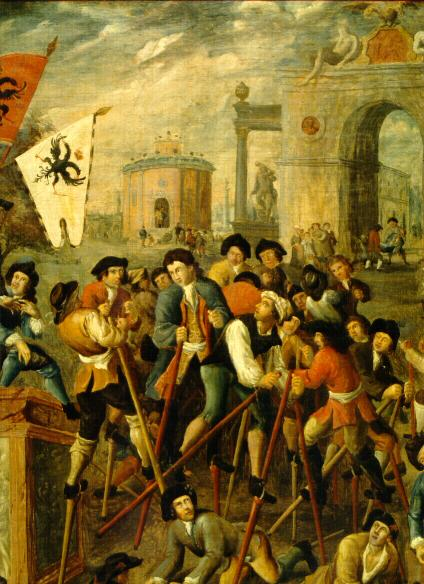
Painting (~1720) representing a joust on stilts in Namur. Decorative Art Museum, Namur.

Stilt jousting is a 600-year-old tradition of the city of Namur, Belgium, in which teams of costumed stilt wearers attempt to knock each other to the ground.

The stilt walkers are divided in two teams; the "Mélans" jousting on yellow and black stilts, who represent the old city, and the "Avresses" on red and white stilts, representing the new city and the suburbs.

Both teams use jousting stilts, a type of stilts developed in Namur. A jouster's aim is to bring down all the jousters from the other team. (A fallen player cannot get back onto their stilts.)

In 2021, UNESCO officially recognised the tradition as an intangible cultural heritage of humanity.

== History ==
The ban of December 8, 1411 is the earliest official document documenting stilt jousting in Namur. The lord of Namur banned the practice for people over 13 years.

Over the centuries, jousting on stilts has been at the center of major popular festivals in Namur. The major jousts of the Carnival (17th and 18th centuries) could bring together up to 2000 jousters on stilts.

Jousting on stilts was also the welcome gift offered by the people of Namur to distinguished visitors. This explains why great names in history attended a joust on stilts in Namur, including:

- Philip the Good (1439)
- Charles V, Holy Roman Emperor and King of Spain (1515, 1531)
- Phillipe II of Spain (1549)
- Louis XIV of France (1693)
- Peter the Great of Russia (1717)
- Napoleon Bonaparte (1803)
- The Kings of the Belgians Leopold III, Baudouin, Albert II and Philippe.

== Namur stilt jousts nowadays ==
Jousting on stilts is still practiced in Namur.

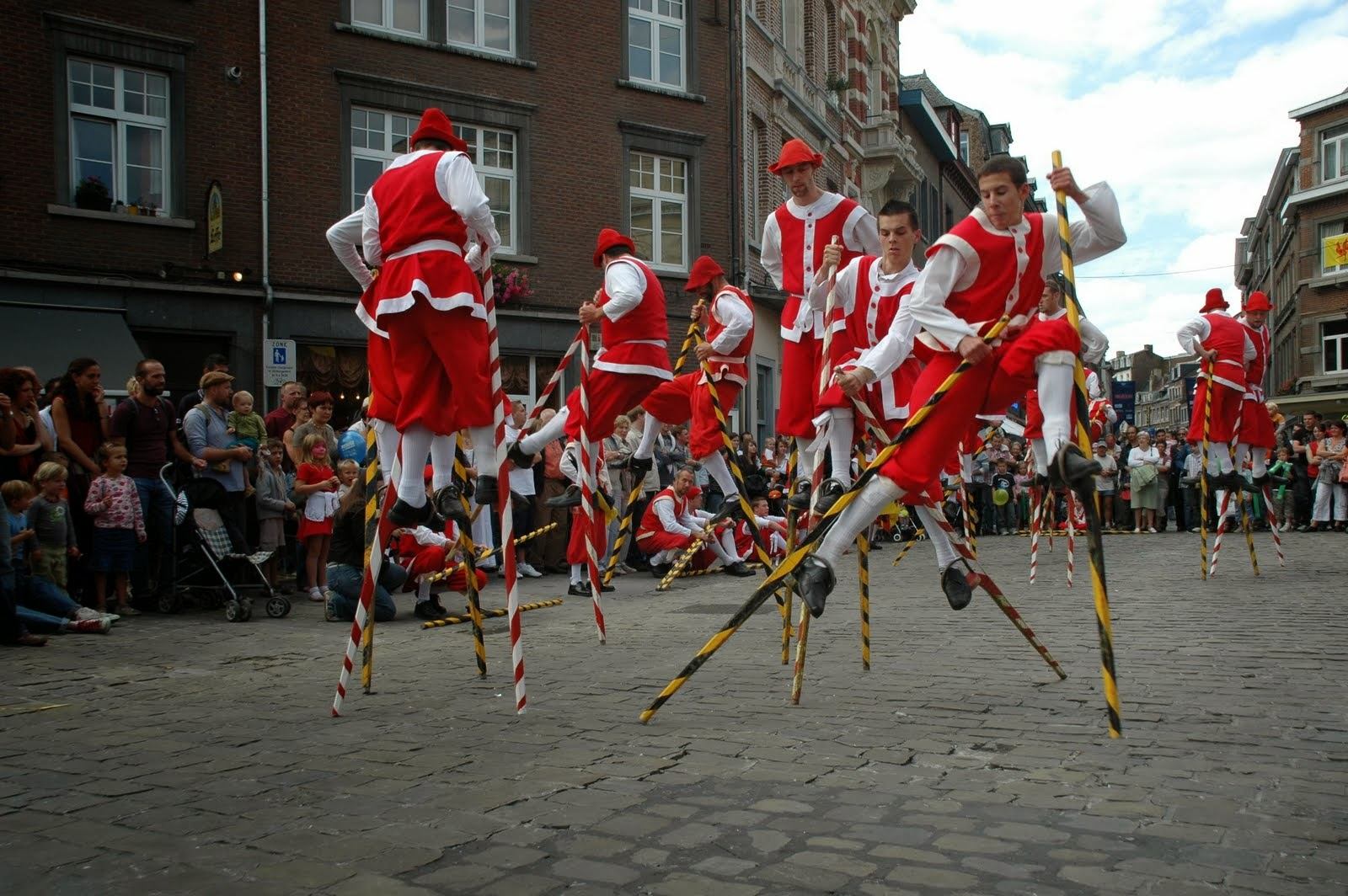
Joust on stilts in Namur (2015)

The jousters, called "Les Echasseurs Namurois" (literally "the stilt jousters of Namur") are part of all the major Namur festivals. The joust of the golden stilt is the most important of the year. It is held on the third Sunday of September on the occasion of the Festival of Wallonia. 6,000 to 8,000 people gathered in front of the cathedral to support the fifty or so stilt walkers involved.

== Accolades ==
2004: Recognized as intangible heritage of the Wallonia-Brussels Federation ("Chef-d'œuvre du patrimoine oral et immatériel de la Communauté Francaise" )

2016: Walloon merit officer

2021 : Namur stilt jousting registered on the UNESCO Representative List of the Intangible Cultural Heritage of Humanity.
