= The Darkness (2016 American film) =

Supernatural horror film

- Theatrical release poster
- Directed by: Greg McLean
- Written by: Shayne Armstrong; S.P. Krause; Greg McLean
- Produced by: Jason Blum; Matthew Kaplan; Bianca Martino
- Starring: Kevin Bacon; Radha Mitchell; Jennifer Morrison; Lucy Fry; David Mazouz; Ming-Na Wen; Paul Reiser
- Cinematography: Toby Oliver
- Edited by: Sean Lahiff; Timothy Alverson
- Music by: Johnny Klimek
- Production companies: Blumhouse Productions; Chapter One Films; EMU Creek Pictures
- Distributed by: BH Tilt; High Top Releasing
- Release date: May 13, 2016
- Running time: 92 minutes
- Country: United States
- Language: English
- Budget: $4 million
- Box office: $10.9 million

The Darkness is a 2016 American supernatural horror film, directed by Greg McLean and co-written by McLean, Shayne Armstrong, and Shane Krause. The film stars Kevin Bacon, Radha Mitchell, David Mazouz, Lucy Fry, Matt Walsh, Jennifer Morrison, Ming-Na Wen and Parker Mack.

The film is about a family who visits the Grand Canyon and brings home a supernatural force that feeds off their fears and takes over their lives. Filming began in April 2014 in Los Angeles and ended in May the same year.

Blumhouse Tilt and High Top Releasing released the film on May 13, 2016 (Friday the 13th). It was largely panned by critics, but grossed $10.9 million against a $4 million budget.

== Plot ==
Peter and Bronny Taylor go on a vacation to the Grand Canyon in Arizona with Stephanie, their bulimic teenage daughter, Mikey, their adolescent autistic son, and another family, the Carters. Mikey discovers a small Kiva cavern, where he finds black rocks with symbols on them. He takes the stones.

When the Taylors return home, strange things begin to happen. Bronny finds that the kitchen taps keep turning on, and Stephanie sees handprints on a mirror, both of which Mikey blames on “Jenny.” After Stephanie gets home from school, she vomits into a container and puts it under her bed. Bronny catches her, and she and Peter learn that Stephanie has been throwing up for a while. They take her to a hospital for help, leaving Mikey at Bronny's mother's house. Bronny's mother finds Mikey trying to kill her cat, much to Peter's disbelief.

At home, Bronny searches online for answers to the strange activity and learns about the Anasazi Indians, who believed that demons were bound to rocks hidden in caves. If the rocks are taken, the demons take the shape of a crow, snake, coyote, wolf, and buffalo. The family has already had encounters with a crow and a snake. The demons connect to young children who are dragged into their world, triggering an event known as 'The Darkness.' The only way they can be banished is if the rocks are returned to where they were found by someone who is not afraid.

Bronny and Peter later find Mikey covered in black marks from a fire in his room, blood pouring from his mouth. Later that night, Bronny has a nightmare of a wolf. Depressed, she starts drinking. In Mikey's room, the fire-damaged part of the wall is revealed to be a portal. Stephanie is choked by handprints appearing all over her wall and body. In the treehouse, Peter sees a coyote and the shadow of a demon in Stephanie's window. The force stops choking Stephanie as he rushes in. He then breaks down Mikey's bathroom door and finds him with marks all over the walls and ceiling.

Peter calls a number given to him by his boss. It belongs to a woman named Teresa, who is said to perform spiritual healings. Teresa comes over with her granddaughter, Gloria, who acts as an interpreter. As they cleanse the house, Teresa and Gloria go into Mikey's room and note that this is where the real evil lives. They recite a chant as Mikey tries to enter the portal.

Peter sees Mikey walking into the portal with the demons. He finds the stones and follows Mikey into the portal but cannot set the stones down due to his fear. He offers to swap places with Mikey, but Mikey ends the event of 'The Darkness' by picking the rocks up and putting them back down, as he is not afraid. The demons are banished, and Peter and Mikey jump out of the portal together. It disappears, and Gloria declares that the house is clean of evil energy.

== Cast ==
- Kevin Bacon as Peter Taylor
- Radha Mitchell as Bronny Taylor
- David Mazouz as Michael Taylor
- Lucy Fry as Stephanie Taylor
- Matt Walsh as Gary Carter
- Jennifer Morrison as Joy Carter
- Ming-Na Wen as Wendy Richards
- Parker Mack as Andrew Carter
- Trian Long-Smith as Sammy Levin
- Paul Reiser as Simon Richards
- Ilza Rosario Ponko as Gloria Ortega
- Tara Lynne Barr as Kat
- Judith McConnell as Trish
- Krista Marie Yu as Tasha
- Alma Martinez as Teresa Morales
- A.J. Tannen as H. Quinlan

== Production ==
On February 25, 2014, Kevin Bacon and Radha Mitchell signed on to star in the film. On March 5, director Greg McLean stated, "The story is based on a true story that was relayed to me first-hand many years ago about an actual haunting." On April 11, David Mazouz was added to the film. On May 6, Ming-Na Wen joined the cast of the film, and on May 7, Lucy Fry was added to the cast to play Stephanie, the Taylor family's daughter. Trian Long-Smith also joined the film on the same day, to play Sammy Levin, the savvy, bright and flirtatious intern working for Peter Taylor's character. On May 9, Matt Walsh joined the cast of the film, to play Gary Carter. Parker Mack also joined the film. On May 14, Jennifer Morrison was added to the cast to play Joy Carter, Gary's wife and also a mother of a child.

=== Filming ===
Principal photography began in April 2014 in Los Angeles, and ended in May 2014. The film was shot with the camera Arri Alexa Plus 4:3, as revealed by cinematographer Toby Oliver.

=== Music ===
On June 2, 2014, Johnny Klimek was hired to score the film.

== Reception ==
=== Box office ===
The Darkness was projected to gross $3–5 million from 1,755 theaters in its opening weekend. The film grossed $206,000 from its Thursday night previews and $2.1 million on its first day. It went on to gross $4.9 million in its opening weekend, finishing 4th at the box office, behind Captain America: Civil War ($72.6 million), The Jungle Book ($17.1 million), and fellow newcomer Money Monster ($14.8 million).

=== Critical response ===
On Rotten Tomatoes, the film has a rating of 3%, based on 34 reviews, with an average rating of 2.7/10. The site's consensus reads, "The Darkness clumsily relies on an assortment of genre tropes, leaving only the decidedly non-frightening ghost of superior horror films in its wake." On Metacritic, the film has a score of 27 out of 100, based on 10 critics, indicating "generally unfavorable reviews". Audiences polled by CinemaScore gave the film an average grade of "C" on an A+ to F scale. It is currently Blumhouse Productions' worst reviewed film to date.
