= Roger Burton =

American jazz musician, psychology professor, and actor (1928–2018)

Roger V. Burton (January 18, 1928 – November 30, 2018) was an American jazz musician, psychology professor and actor, known for his work on Baskets. He appeared in films and television shows created by his daughters' Five Sisters Productions company, most notably, Old Guy.

He was born in California and started life as a jazz musician there, playing with Peggy Lee, Nat King Cole, Johnny Ray, the Ink Spots and Hoagy Carmichael, among others.

He earned his PhD in psychology at Harvard and moved to Washington, D.C. to work at National Institutes of Health before being wooed to teach at SUNY at Buffalo.

After retirement, he moved with his wife, the author Gabrielle B. Burton, to Los Angeles, where he started his third career as an actor and worked until his death.
