= Roy Maloy =

Australian stilt walker and circus performer

- Born: Roy Timothy McPherson; 27 October 1975 (age 50); Melbourne, Australia
- Occupation: Entertainer
- Known for: Stilt walking, circus stunts

Roy Maloy (born Roy Timothy McPherson, 27 October 1975 in Melbourne, Victoria), is an Australian stilt walker, fire breather and stunt performer.

== Career ==
A Victorian provincial newspaper described Maloy as "Australian Circus King."

=== Stilt-walking records ===
In 2008, Maloy set an unverified world record for the tallest stilts ever walked on: on 1 November, after 11 attempts, he took five independent steps on 17 m (56 ft) stilts each weighing almost 30 kg (66 lb).

In June 2011, Maloy attempted to set a record by walking more than 5 km in under an hour on 91.4 cm wooden stilts weighing 3.5 kg.

== Honorary titles ==
On 16 March 2010, Maloy was King of the Parade at the Brimbank Festival in Sunshine, Victoria.
