= Jennifer Burton (filmmaker) =

American filmmaker and professor

Jennifer Burton is an American filmmaker and professor at Tufts University. She often works with her four sisters through their Five Sisters Productions company, in which the sisters all share credit but take turns directing, writing, etc. Films produced by the company include Manna From Heaven, Temps, and Kings, Queens and In-Betweens.
