= Omaha Film Festival =

- Official logo
- Location: Omaha, Nebraska, U.S.
- Established: 2000s
- Language: English
- Website: omahafilmfestival.org

The Omaha Film Festival is a Omaha, Nebraska based American film festival.

== Media ==
The Omaha Film Festival has been described as "an Academy-Worthy Event."

In 2022, the festival celebrated its 17th year.
