= Stilts =

Poles used for circus performance, pastime, or work

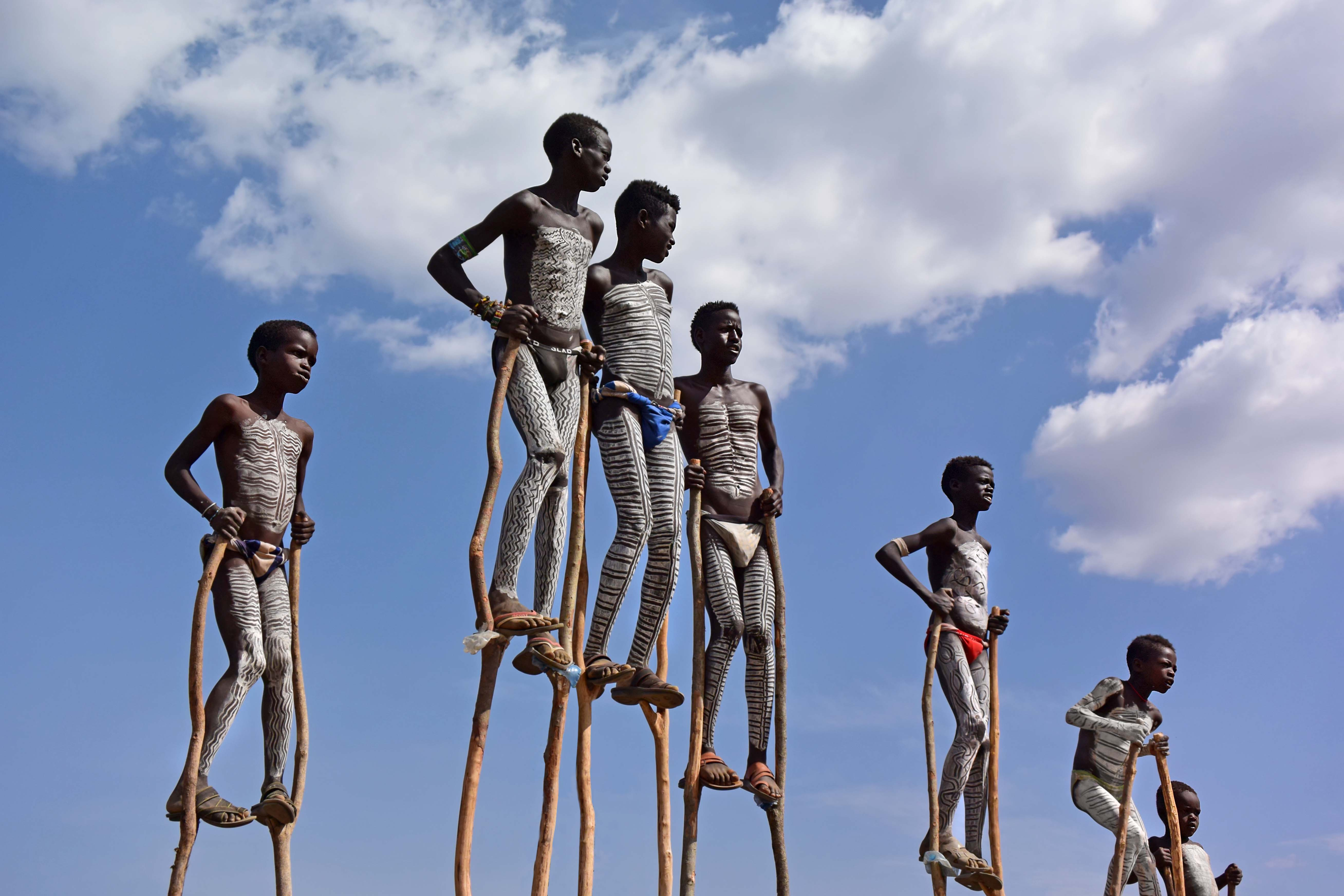
Children of the Banna people in Ethiopia on stilts

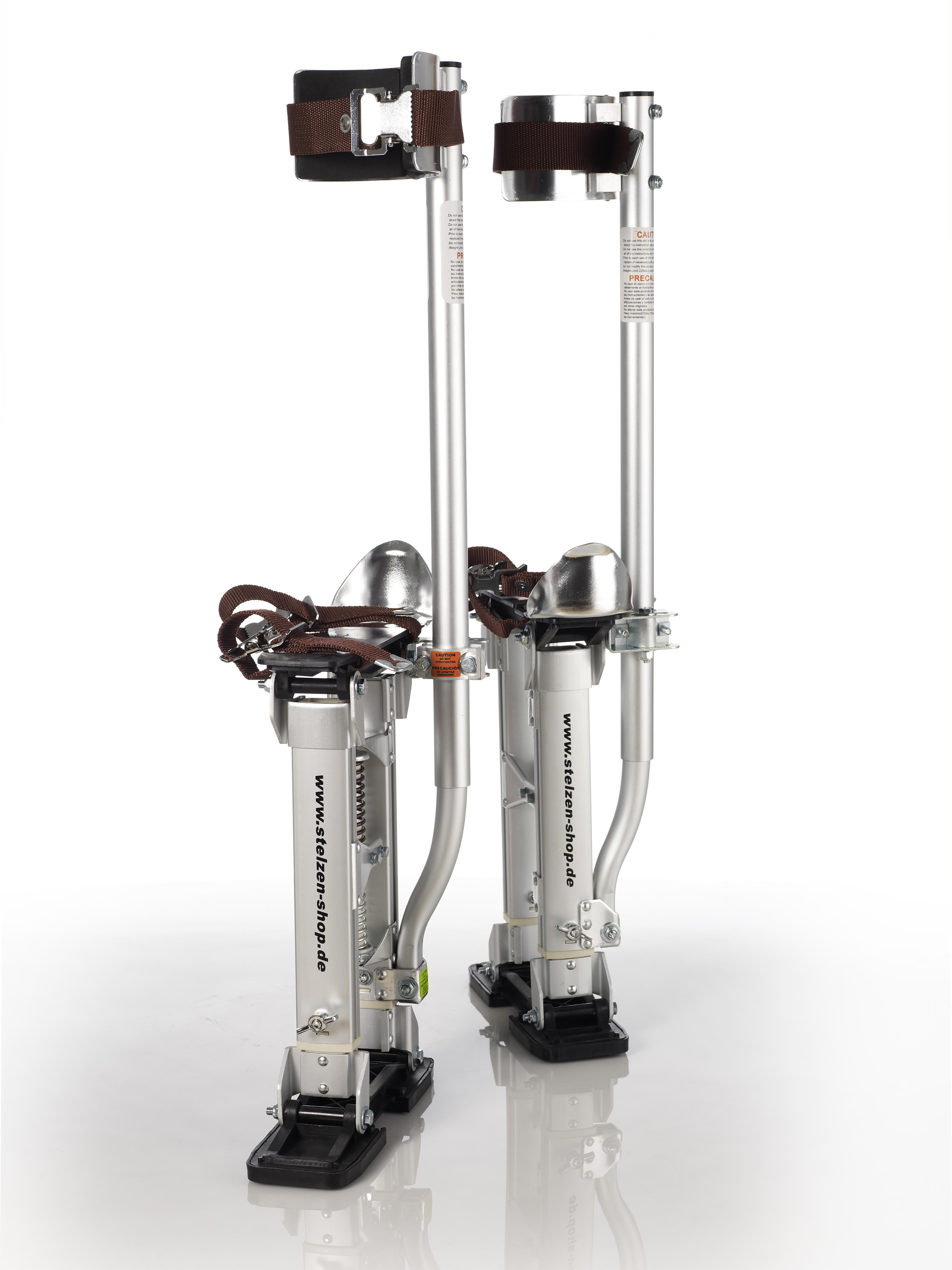
Plasterer's (drywall) stilts

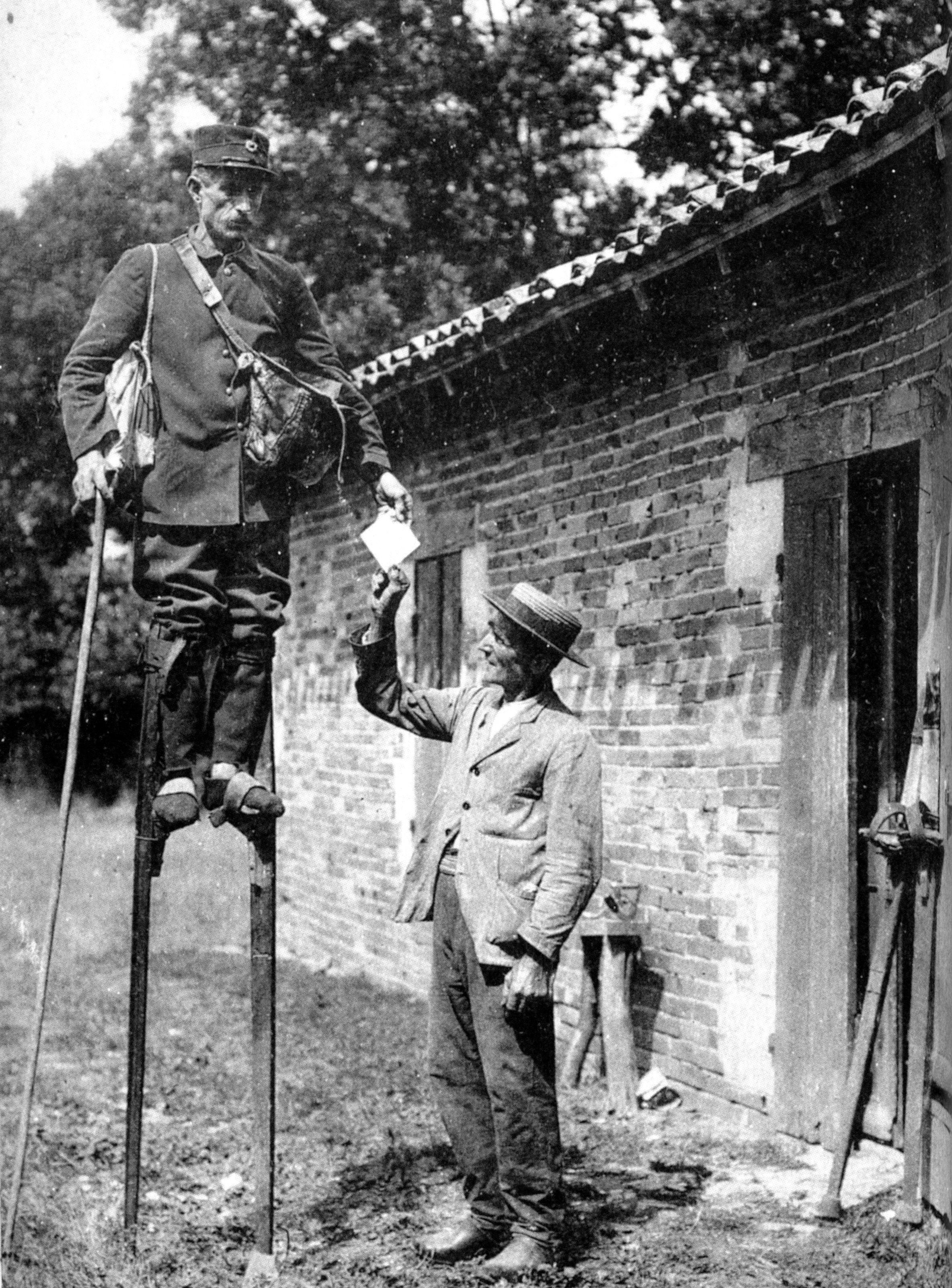
A French postman on stilts, early 20th century

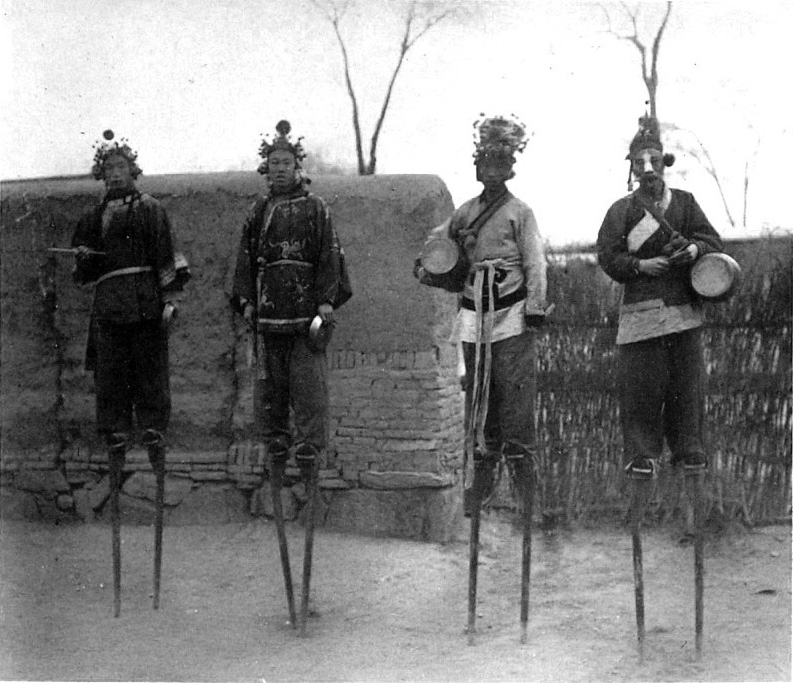
Stilts from China in late Qing dynasty

Stilts are poles, rods, posts or pillars that allow a person or structure to stand at a height above the ground.

Stilts for walking have platforms for the feet and may be strapped to the user's legs. Stilts have been used for many hundreds of years.

== Types ==
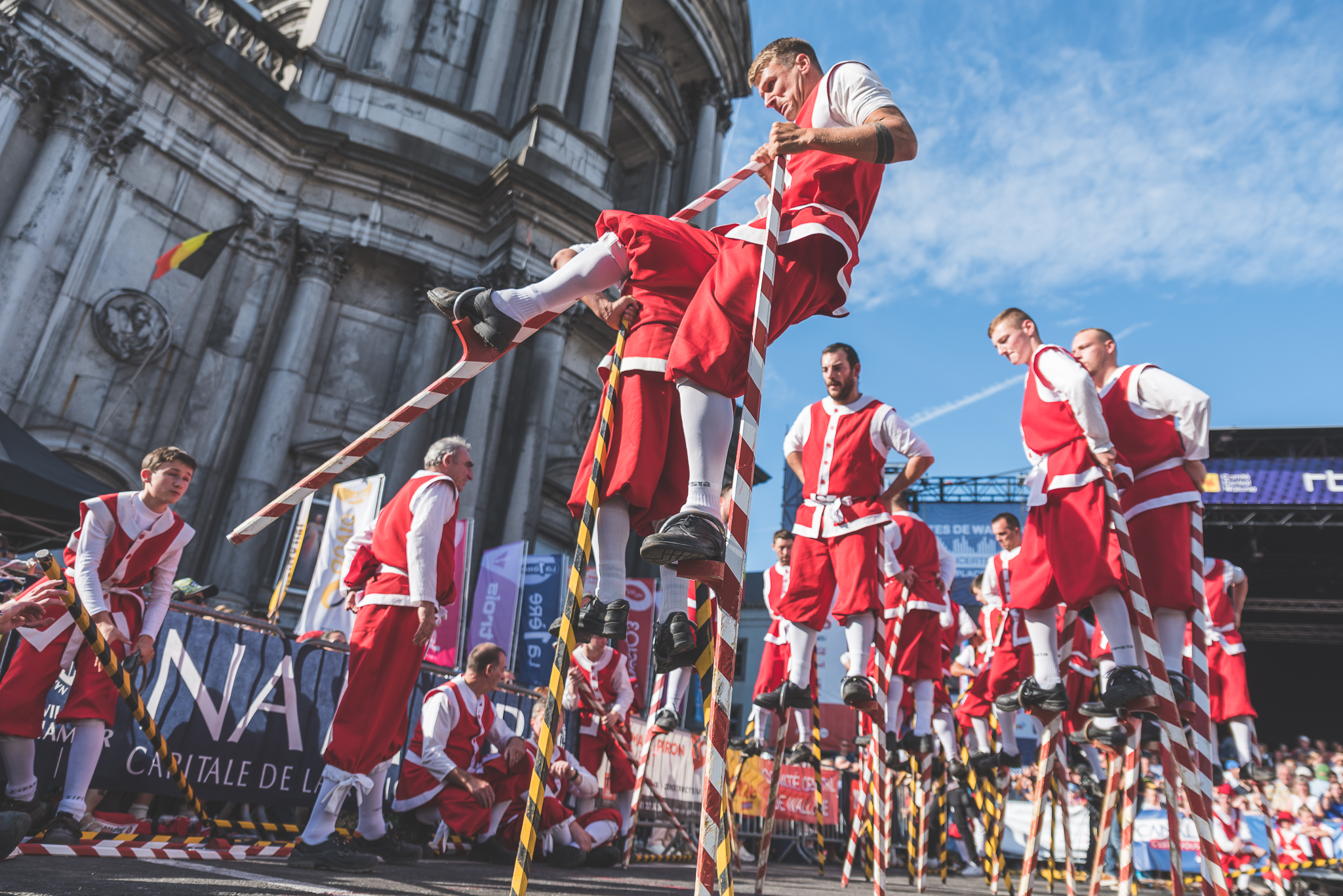
Joust on stilts in Namur. Stiltwalkers fights dates back to 1411 in Namur and still exists today.

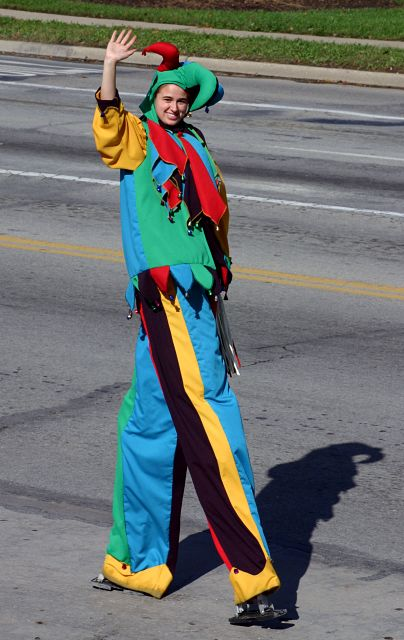
A stilt walker dressed as a court jester participating in a parade

=== Hand-held ===
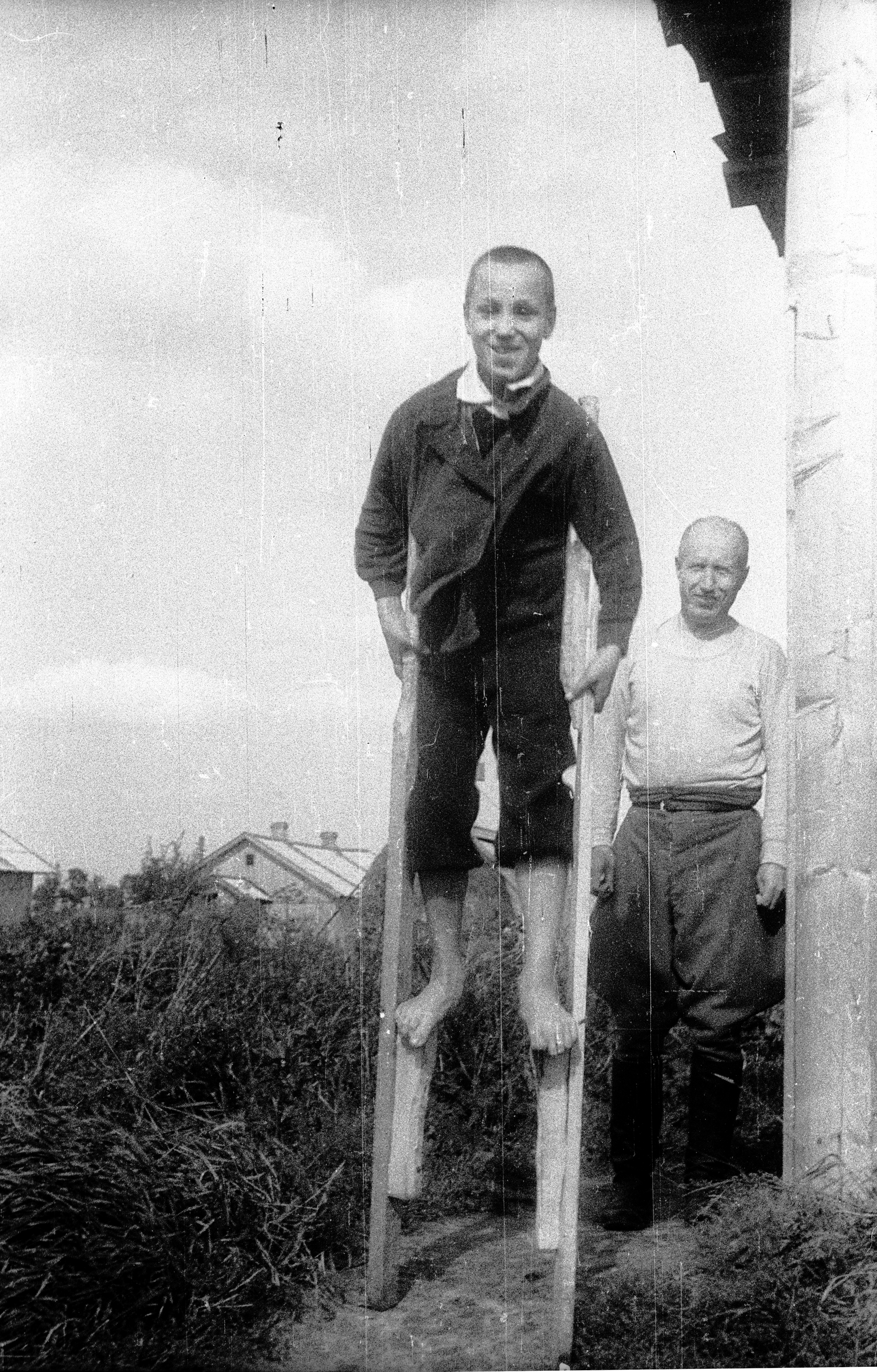
A boy on stilts. Smolensk (Russia), 1952.

Hand-held stilts are used as childhood toys and in circus skills workshops and are of two main types: string and can/bucket stilts and pole stilts. Unlike other forms of stilts, hand-held stilts are not tied or strapped to the wearer.

Hand-held pole stilts consist of two long poles, each with a foot support. The stilt walker holds onto the upper end of the pole, rests their feet on the foot plates, and pulls upward on the pole while taking a step.

A second type of hand-held pole stilts are similar to the first type but end in a handle so the walker has more control and flexibility to move their stilts. Those type of stilts can be very high (more than 4 m or 13 ft from foot to ground).

Hand-held string stilts (also known as tin can or bucket stilts) are platforms with strings attached to them. The platforms, most commonly made of tin cans or small plastic upturned buckets hold the stilt walker's weight while the strings are used to pull the cans to the feet as they take a step.

=== Peg ===
Peg stilts, also known as Chinese stilts, are commonly used by professional performers. These stilts strap on at the foot, ankle, and just below the knee. Peg stilts are often made from wood but can also be made of aluminium or tubular steel. This type of stilts are the most lightweight ones and allow a user to walk quickly, to turn suddenly, and even to jump rope or dance. The stilt walker must keep moving at all times to keep their balance.

=== Drywall ===
Drywall stilts are adjustable tools designed for elevating users to reach high ceilings and walls, eliminating the need for frequent ladder or bench climbing and thereby reducing task completion times. They are widely utilized by tradespeople in drywall installation, electrical work, insulation, acoustics, painting, and other construction tasks. Constructed from lightweight yet robust materials like aluminum or magnesium, these stilts include features such as padded calf braces, secure straps at calves, ankles, and toes, dual-action springs for balance, and non-slip soles for stability and comfort. Compared to peg stilts used in performance arts and traditional wood stilts, drywall stilts excel in adjustability, safety, strength, and efficiency, minimizing fatigue and boosting productivity among professionals.

=== Spring ===
Spring stilts also known as bounce stilts are spring-loaded and allow the user to run, jump and perform various acrobatics. Spring stilts using fiberglass leaf springs were patented in the United States in 2004 under the trademark "PowerSkip", marketed for recreational and extreme sports use. Using these stilts is also called powerbocking, named for the stilts' inventor, Alexander Boeck. Spring stilts are often mostly made of aluminium. Spring stilts using steel coil springs, an antecedent of the pogo stick, were attempted in the 19th century.

=== Digitigrade ===
The digitigrade stilt is a peg stilt whose line follows the foot and not the shin bone. This allows costumers to mimic the walk of an animal. Because of the extreme stresses on this type of design they tend to be more rare; that is, fewer successful home-made designs.

=== Articulated ===
This type of stilt is similar to drywall stilts in that they allow the walker to stand in one place without having to shift weight from foot to foot to stay balanced. Articulated stilts feature a flexing joint under the ball of the foot and, in one variant, under the heel. These stilts are commonly used in theme parks such as Walt Disney World and Universal Studios because they allow performers to safely dance and perform stunts that would easily damage other types of stilts. Two brands of articulated stilts include "Bigfoots" manufactured by Gary Ensmenger of Orlando, Florida, and "Jay Walkers", manufactured by Stilt Werks of Las Vegas, Nevada.

== History ==
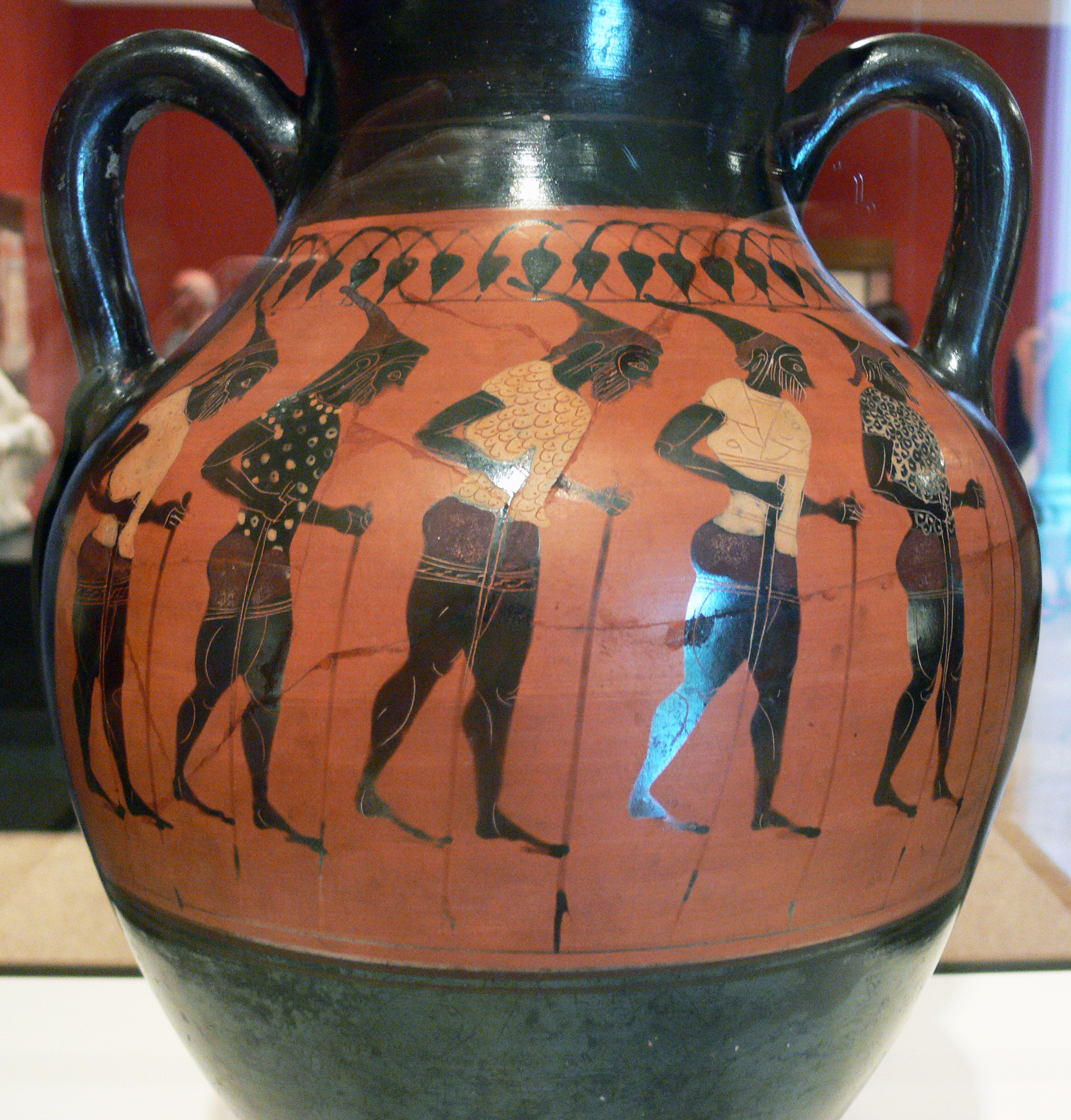
Ancient Greek jar depicting stilt walkers, 6th century BC

In Armenia, Urartian bronze belts dating from the 9th to 7th centuries BCE have been found depicting acrobats on stilts. Archaeological ruins and texts show that stiltwalking was practised in ancient Greece as far back as the 6th century BCE. The ancient Greek word for a stilt walker was κωλοβαθριστής (kōlobathristēs), from κωλόβαθρον (kōlobathron), "stilt", a compound of κῶλον (kōlon), "limb" and βάθρον (bathron), "base, pedestal". Some stilt use traditions are very old. In Namur, Belgium, stilt walkers of Namur have practiced fights on stilts since 1411. The inhabitants of marshy or flooded areas sometimes use stilts for practical purposes, such as working in swamps or fording swollen rivers. The shepherds of the Landes region of southern France used to watch their flocks while standing on stilts to extend their field of vision, while townspeople often used them to traverse the soggy ground in their everyday activities.

In the English region of Kent, farmers of hops vines used stilts to attach strings to wires 12 feet above the ground, which would support the plants as they grew. This technique was documented up to the mid 20th century before being superseded.

== Modern uses ==
Stilts can be used as a prop in entertainment, as a tool to enable other types of work to be achieved and as part of a hobby or recreation.

=== Entertainment ===
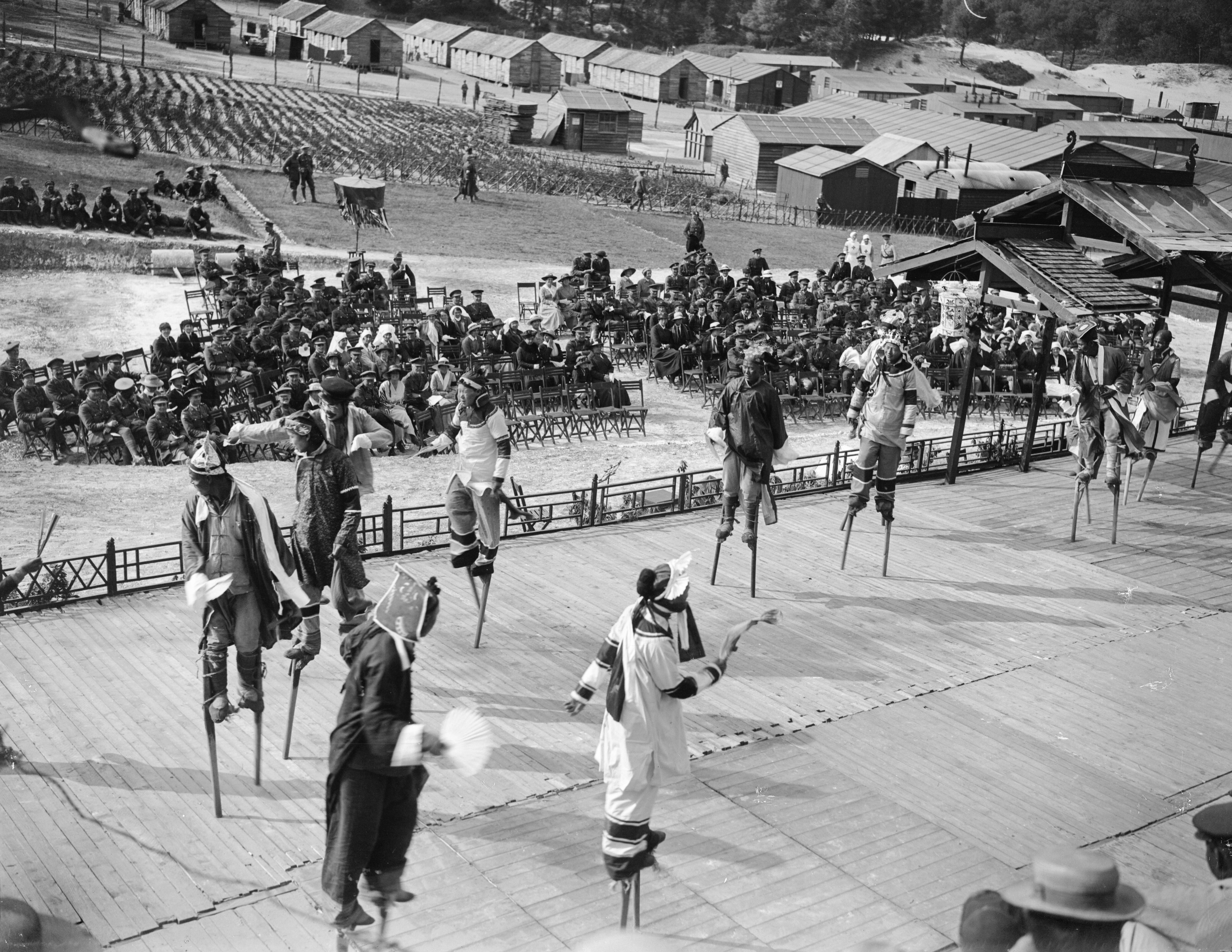
Members of the Chinese Labour Corps performing on stilts, June 1918

Stilts are used widely in many countries for entertainment. Stilt walkers perform in parades, festivals, street events and at corporate functions.

The local festivals of Anguiano (La Rioja, Spain) feature a dance on stilts in which dancers go down a stepped street while turning. The dancers have been male for more than 400 years until 2025, when a young woman was included in the dance. Other stilt walking and dancing festivals are held in Deventer, Netherlands, in early July each year, and in Namur, Belgium.

Early stilt walking acts were mostly of the style of a very tall person with the costume having long trousers or skirt to cover the stilts. More recently stilt walkers have created a wide variety of costumes that do not resemble a tall person. Examples are flowers and animals. The tall person type has also expanded to include a wide variety of themes. Examples include sportsmen, historical acts and acts based on literary or film characters.

One of the most recent varieties of stilt walking acts is a stilt walker riding a "stilt bicycle" with an extended seat post and handlebar stem. With Light festivals being very popular around the world, Stilt walkers have incorporated technology in their costumes making. It is very common to see LED Robots on stilts or other light costumes at public or private events.

=== Work ===
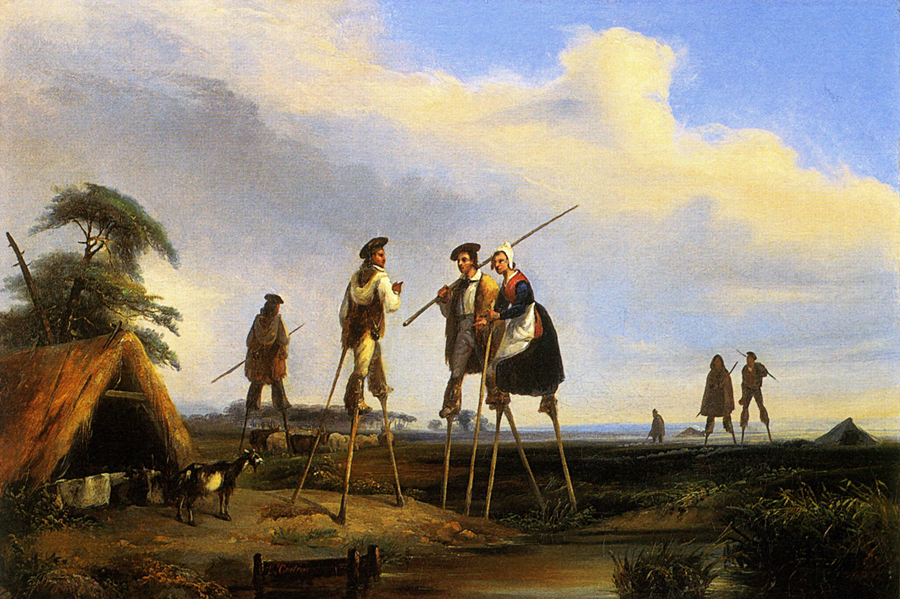
Shepherds walking on stilts in the Landes region of France

Aluminium stilts are commonly used by fruit farmers in California to prune and harvest their peach, plum, and apricot trees. Stilts have been used for washing large windows, repairing roofs, and installing or painting high ceilings.

Stilts are used during drywall construction, finish painting, and hanging suspended ceiling tiles as means to reach high areas.

=== Recreation ===
Stilts are available to be purchased as a children's skill toy and stilts are commonly taught in circus skills workshops at schools and summer fairs and other events.

== Records ==
In 1891 Sylvain Dornon, a stilt-walker from the Landes region of France, walked from Paris to Moscow in 58 days.

On 1 October 2001 Saimaiti Yiming of China walked 79.6 km (49.5 mi) on 73 cm (29 in) stilts in 24 hours in Shanshan County, Xinjiang, China.

On 14 September 2002 Doug Hunt of Canada walked on the heaviest stilts used. They weighed 62.1 kg (137 lb) for the pair. He managed 29 steps unaided on these 15.56 m (51.0 ft) stilts.

On 15 November 2006 Saimaiti Yiming of China took 10 steps on 16.41 m-high (53.8 ft) stilts to break the Guinness World Record for walking on the tallest stilts.

In 2008 Roy Maloy of Australia took five steps on stilts 17 m (56 ft) high, an unofficial record for the tallest stilts.

On 30 March 2008 Ashrita Furman of the US ran 1.61 km (1 mi) in 7 minutes 13 seconds on spring stilts in Dachau, Germany.

On October 17, 2023 Doug Hunt of Brantford Ontario Canada at age 67 took 14 steps on 16.76 meter (55 ft) stilts, reclaiming the record that he previously set in 2002.

== Gallery ==
Various stilt walkers

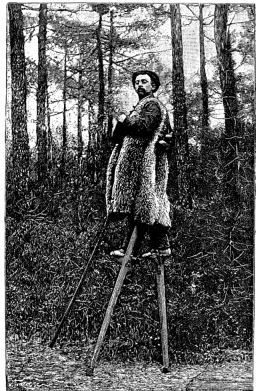
Sylvain Dornon, record holding stilt walker

A trained monkey in Japan using stilts, 2021

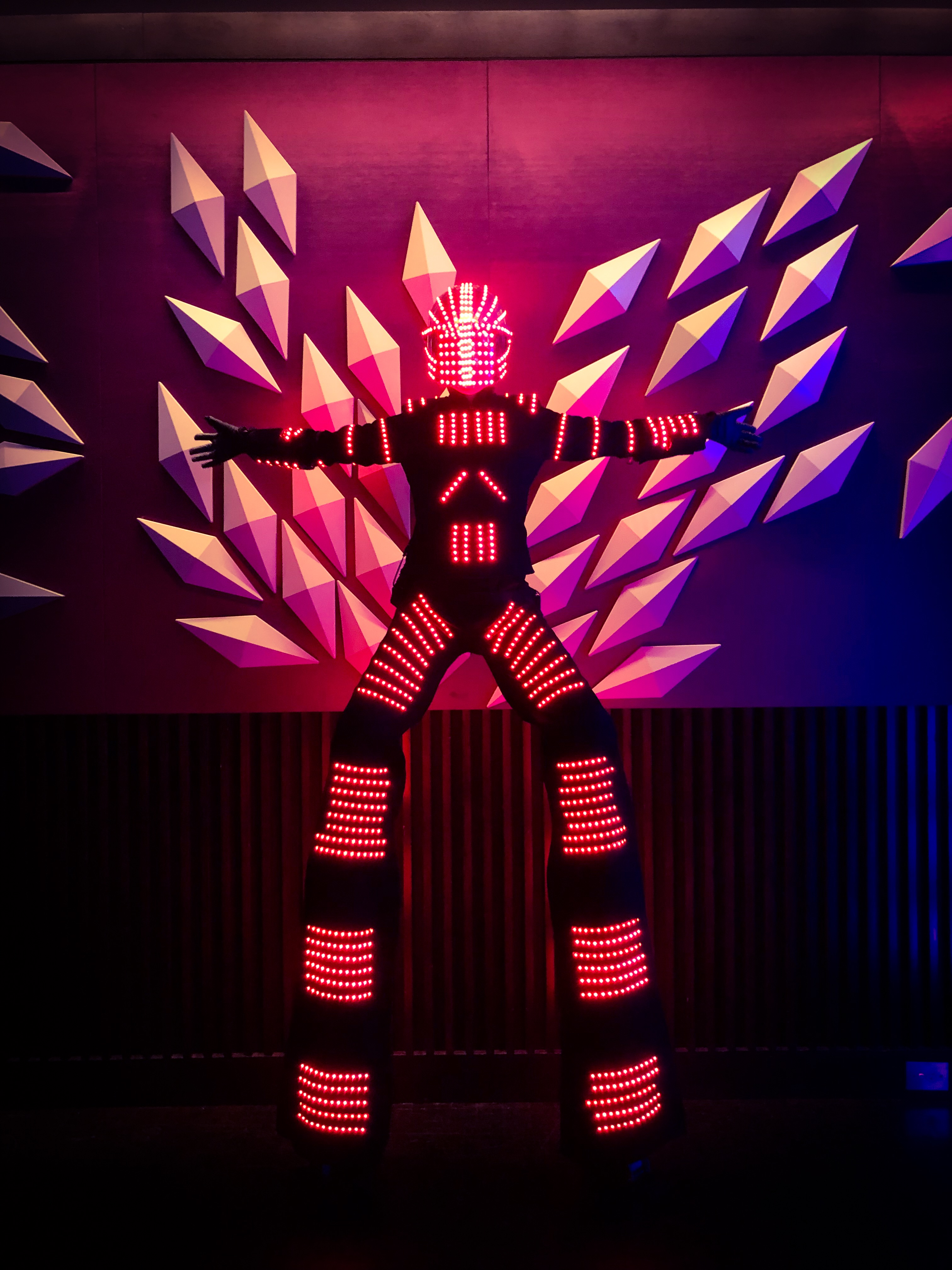
LED robot stilt walker

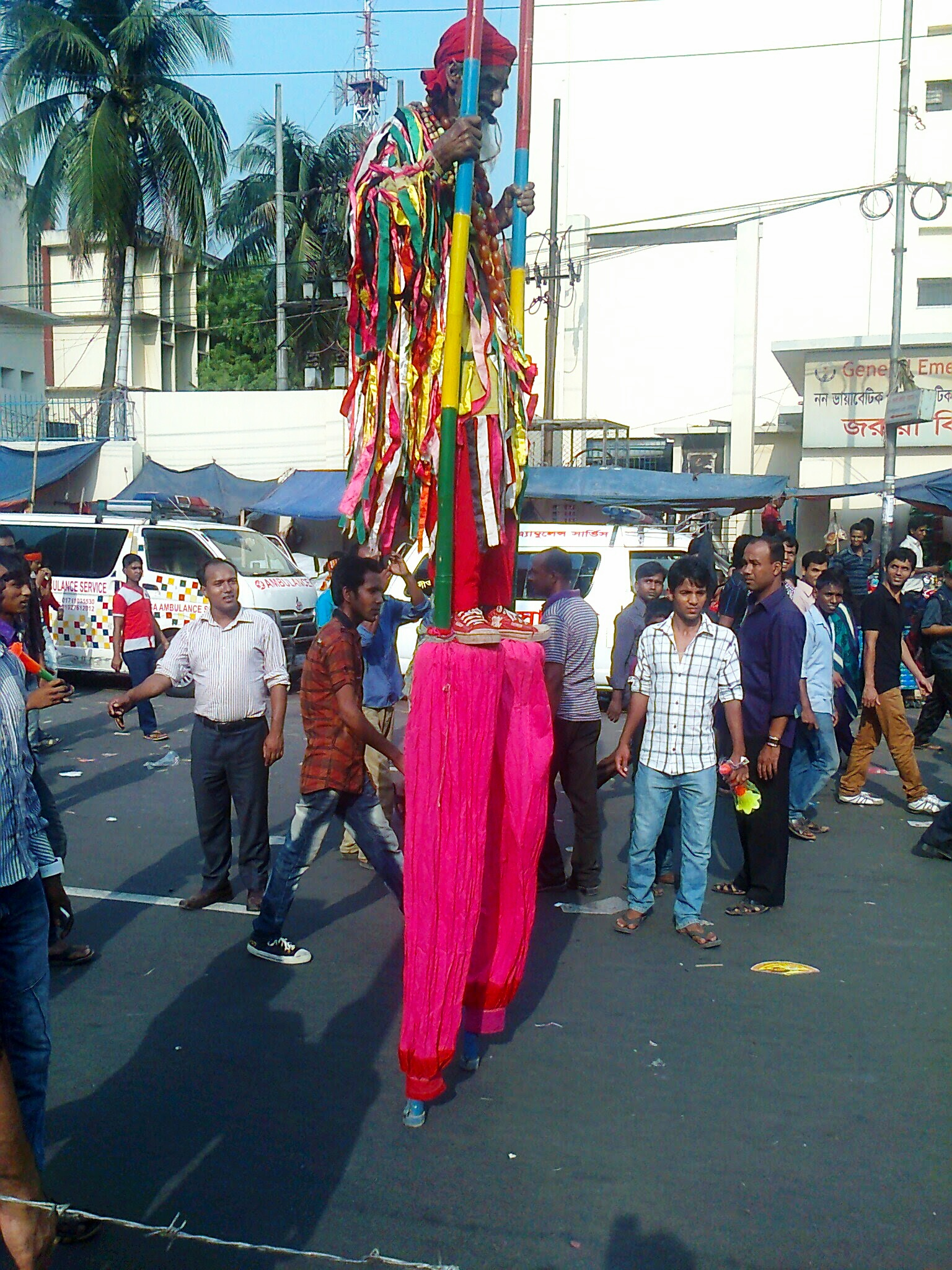
Stilt walker in Bangladesh

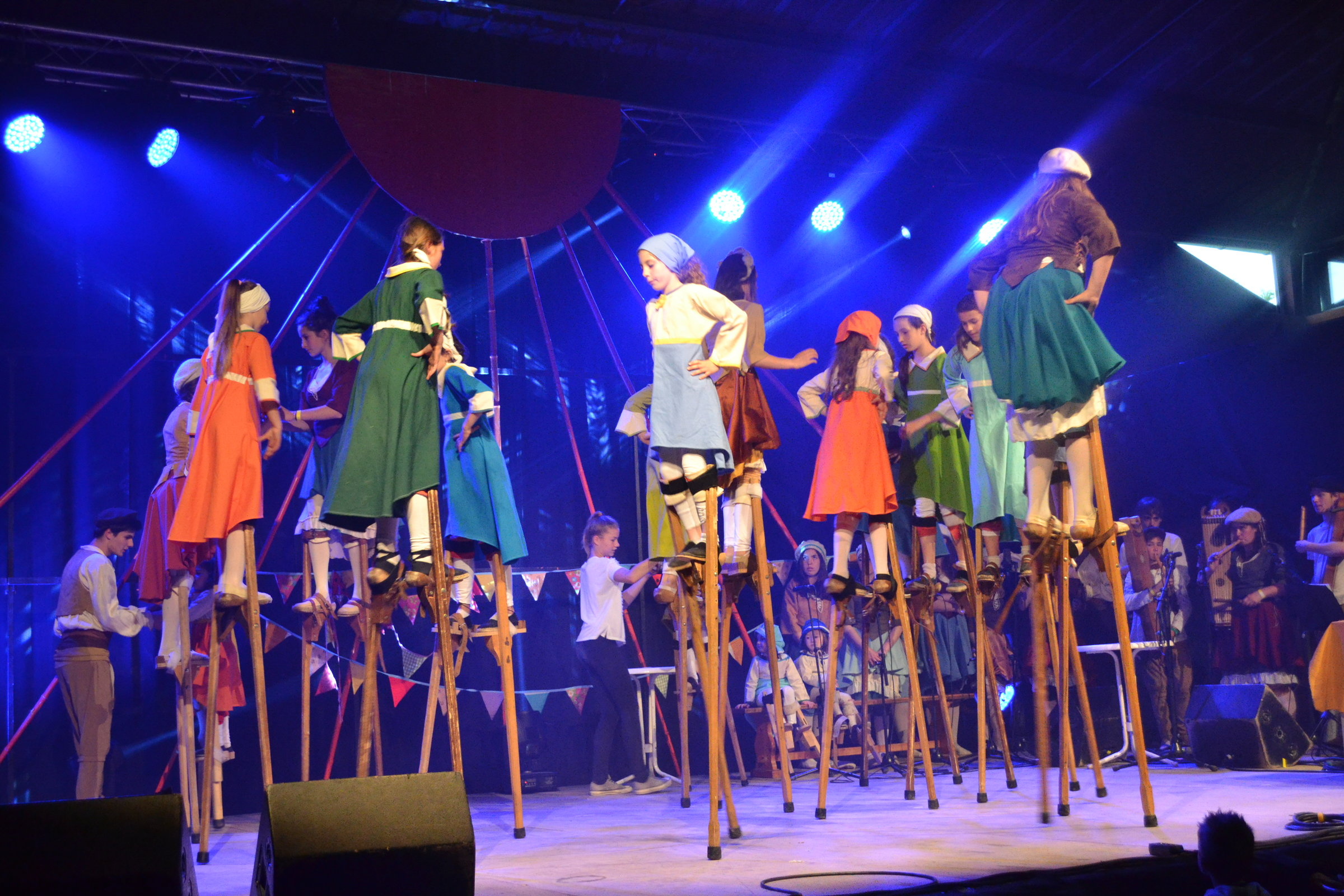
Stilt walkers at a school in France

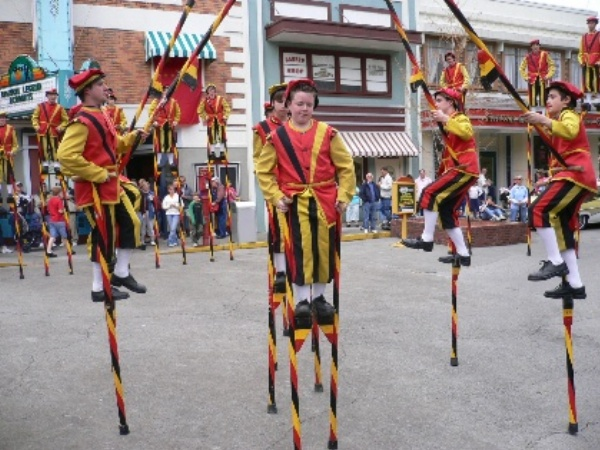
Stilt walking troupe

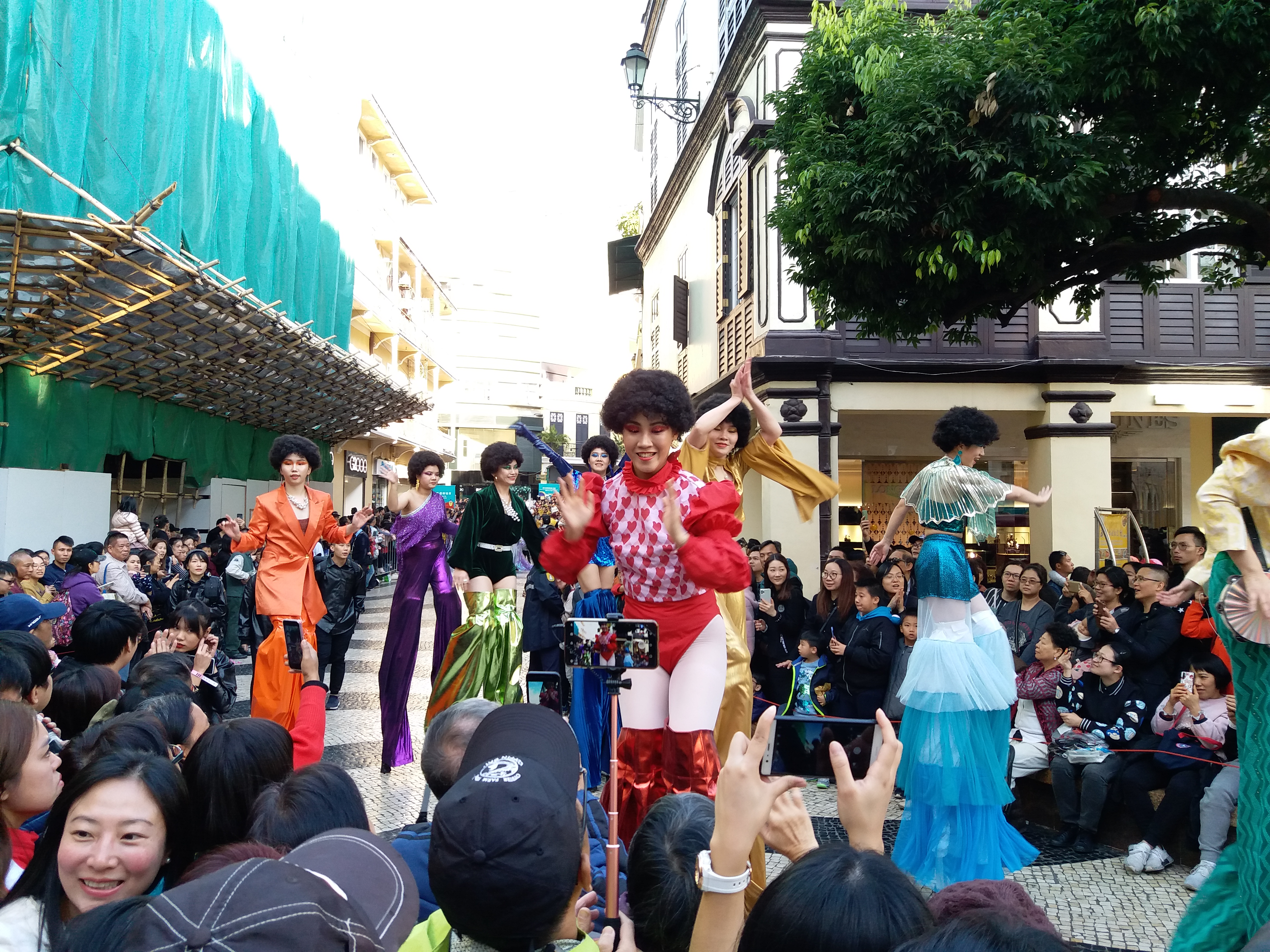
Stilt performers in Macau, China

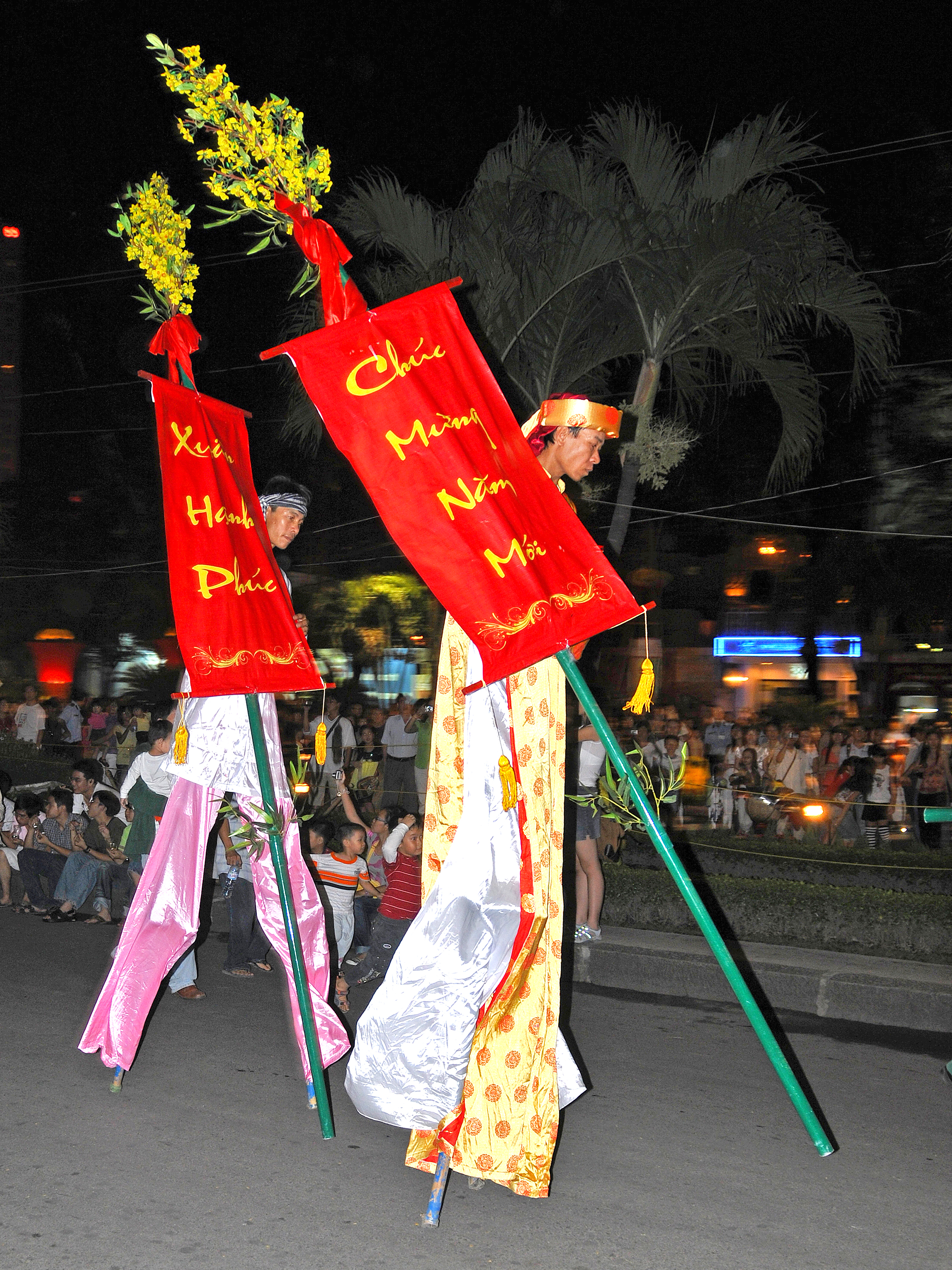
Stilt walking during Tết Nguyên Đán in Vietnam
