= Parker Mack =

American actor

- Born: St. Louis, Missouri, U.S.
- Occupations: Actor; Writer; Director
- Years active: 2006–present
- Relatives: Kelley Mack (sister)

Parker Mack Klebenow, known professionally as Parker Mack, is an American actor, writer, musician, and director, who is best known for his role as Finn Madill in the Freeform drama Chasing Life, and as Felix Turner in the MTV romantic comedy series, Faking It.

== Early life and education ==
In 2013, Mack attended the John Rosenfeld Acting Studio in Los Angeles, studying under David Sullivan. He graduated Hinsdale Central High School in the class of 2015.

== Career ==
Mack began his acting career in 2006, appearing in two episodes of the procedural drama series Chicago Fire, where he played Mike Duffy. He was cast in the drama film A Sort of Homecoming, released on March 14, 2015, where he played Nick. Mack was cast in the first and second seasons of Chasing Life as the recurring character Finn Madill. From 2015 to 2016, he played the recurring role of Felix Turner in the romantic comedy series Faking It.

In 2016, Mack appeared in the supernatural horror film The Darkness and also Ouija: Origin of Evil.

Mack has appeared in the television movie: Pretty Little Stalker (2018), Psycho Party Planner (2020) and The Boxer and the Butterfly (2023).

== Personal life ==
Mack's sister, Kelley, died on August 2, 2025, at the age of 33 from Glioma of the central nervous system.

== Filmography ==
Year	Title	Role	Notes
2006	The Ultimate Gift	Patient	Uncredited
2010	Taking Flight	Jack	Short Film
2011	The Knife Thrower's Apprentice	Garrett	Short Film
2012-2013	Chicago Fire	Mike Duffy	2 episodes
2013	Kickstand	Erick	Short Film
2014	Divergent	Sam Robertson	Uncredited
2015	A Sort of Homecoming	Nick	Main Character
2015	Positive	Peter	Short Film, Co-Writer
2015	Chasing Life	Finn Madill	Recurring role; 9 episodes
2015	Yummy Yummy Pals!	A.D. Todd	Short Film
2015–2016	Faking It	Felix Turner	Recurring role; 14 episodes
2016	Falsely Accused	Roy Gainey	
2016	The Darkness	Andrew Carter	
2016	Ouija: Origin of Evil	Mikey	
2018	Pretty Little Stalker	Mark	TV Movie
2020	Psycho Party Planner	Charlie	TV Movie
2023	The Boxer and the Butterfly	Billy	
2026	Sugarcreek Amish Mysteries	Bill	Episode: "Simply Vanished"
2026	Hollywood Adjacent	DJ Bongo	1 episode
