= Manna from Heaven (film) =

- Movie poster
- Directed by: Gabrielle Burton; Maria Burton
- Written by: Gabrielle B. Burton
- Produced by: Gabrielle Burton; Charity Burton; Ursula Burton
- Starring: Maria Burton; Ursula Burton; Seymour Cassel; Shelley Duvall; Jill Eikenberry; Louise Fletcher; Frank Gorshin; Harry Groener; Shirley Jones; Cloris Leachman; Wendie Malick; Austin Pendleton; Cameron Watson
- Cinematography: Ed Slattery
- Edited by: Andy Peterson; Robert Tate; Mattie Valentine
- Music by: Timothy Jones; James T. Sale
- Production company: Five Sisters Productions
- Release date: September 14, 2002
- Running time: 119 minutes
- Country: United States
- Language: English
- Box office: $505,675 (USA)

Manna from Heaven is a 2002 American religious comedy film written by Gabrielle B. Burton and co-directed by her daughters Gabrielle C. Burton and Maria Burton. The film won awards at four film festivals. It was actor Jerry Orbach's final film before his death from prostate cancer in 2004 and Shelley Duvall's second to last film before her death in 2024.

== Plot ==
Manna From Heaven is a comedic fable about what happens when one gets a gift from God (a financial windfall), but many years later, discovers that it was just a loan and is due immediately.

Once upon a time, many years ago, a neighborhood in Buffalo, NY, is mysteriously showered with 20-dollar bills. Theresa, a young girl who everyone thinks is a saint, doesn't have much trouble with convincing her loose-knit "family" that the money is a gift from Heaven. Years later, Theresa, who has become a nun, has an epiphany that it is time to pay the money back, so she calls the eccentric group together to repay the "loan".

The problem is ... nobody wants to give back the money, nobody has the money, they don't know to whom it belongs, and most of them cannot stand each other.

Along the way, the characters learn about family, romance, reconciliation and redemption, and by working together they begin to realize their full potential.

== Principal cast ==
- Shirley Jones as Bunny
- Cloris Leachman as Helen
- Louise Fletcher as Mother Superior
- Ursula Burton as Sister Theresa
- Seymour Cassel as Stanley
- Frank Gorshin as Ed
- Austin Pendleton as "Two-Digit" Doyle
- Shelley Duvall as Detective Dubrinski
- Jerry Orbach as Waltz Contest Announcer
- Maria Burton as Ramona
- Jill Eikenberry as Dottie
- Harry Groener as Tony
- Vincent O'Neill as Monsignor Dailey
- Drew Pillsbury as Mac / Bake
- Wendie Malick as Inez
- Cameron Watson as Patrick

== Critical reception ==
On the review aggregator website Rotten Tomatoes, 22% of 23 critics' reviews are positive, with an average rating of 4.2/10. The website's consensus reads: "Wasting a comedically gifted cast on cloying material, Manna from Heaven tastes more like hogwash." Metacritic, which uses a weighted average, assigned the film a score of 45 out of 100, based on 9 critics, indicating "mixed or average" reviews.

Dave Kehr of The New York Times liked the film overall:

A product neither of Hollywood nor the New York-Sundance indie axis, Manna From Heaven is a true outsider film, and while it would be easy to fault its lack of technical polish, somewhat discursive script and uneven performances, it is also refreshingly sincere, gentle and good-natured.
