= Ron S. Geffner =

American lawyer

- Education: Rutgers University; Benjamin N. Cardozo School of Law
- Occupation: lawyer
- Employer(s): Sadis & Goldberg

Ron S. Geffner is an American attorney and former U.S. Securities and Exchange Commission enforcement lawyer. Geffner is a founding partner of Sadis & Goldberg, where he heads Financial Services Group providing legal counsel to over 800 funds including domestic and international financial institutions, family offices, hedge funds, venture capital and private equity funds. Geffner was previously in-house counsel to the Investment Management Industry Services Group of PricewaterhouseCoopers.

== Early life ==
Geffner began his career with the SEC, where he investigated and prosecuted violations of the federal securities laws with an emphasis on enforcement in connection with violations of the Investment Advisers Act of 1940 and the Investment Company Act of 1940. He also assisted federal and state criminal agencies, such as the Federal Bureau of Investigation, U.S. Attorney’s Office and the Attorney General’s Office, in their investigations of criminal violations of federal and state securities laws.

== Board memberships ==
Geffner served on the board of the Hedge Fund Association and was previously vice president for the international not-for-profit industry trade and nonpartisan lobbying organization devoted to advancing transparency, development and trust in alternative investments.
