= Ursula Burton =

American actor, director and producer

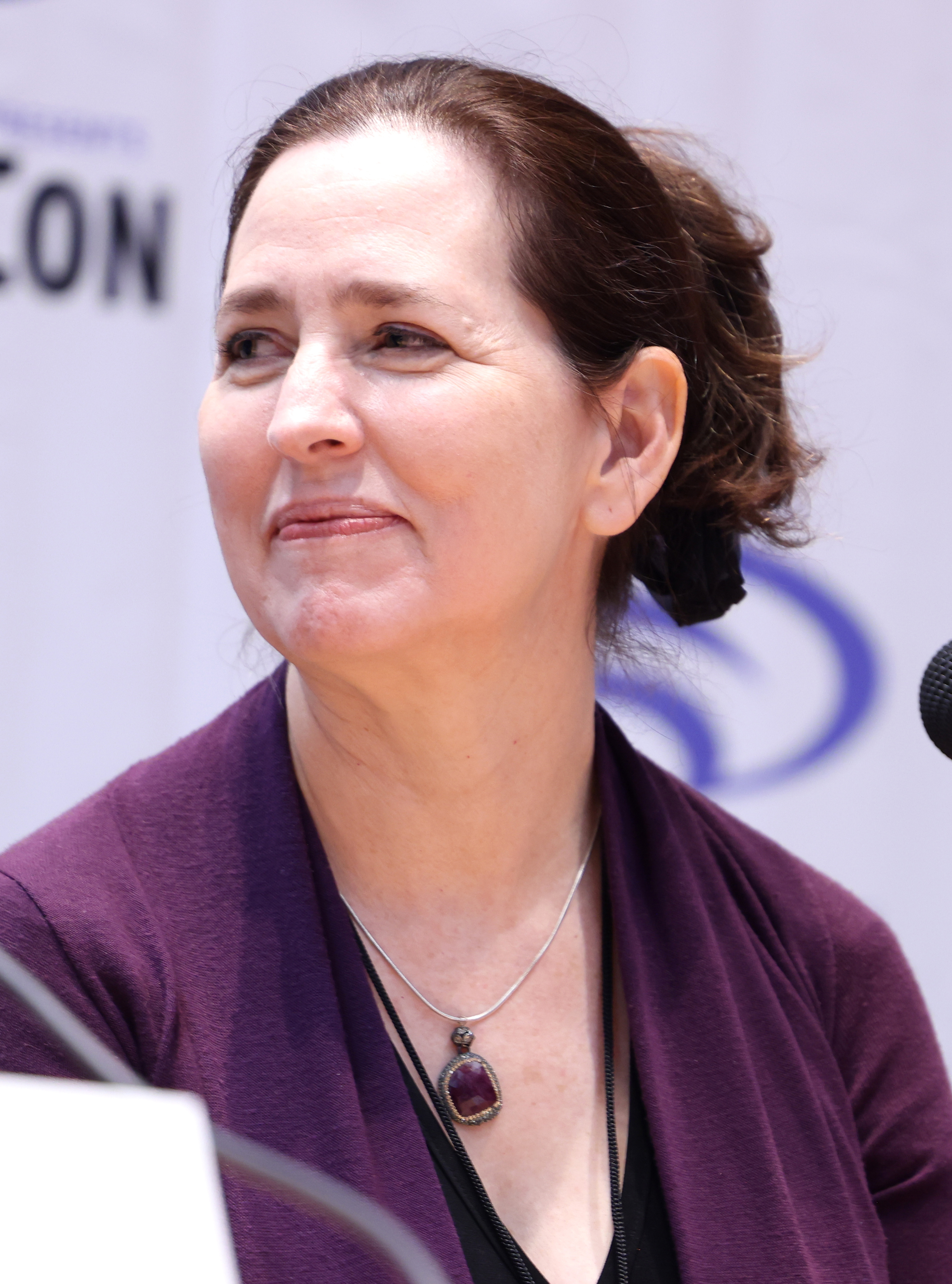
- Burton in 2025
- Born: Ursula C. Burton; November 29, 1966 (age 59)
- Occupations: Actress, producer
- Years active: 1996–present

Ursula Burton is an American actress, director, and producer, best known for her work on The Office. With her Five Sisters Productions company banner, she has produced films including Just Friends (1997), Temps (1999), Manna from Heaven (2002), which the Los Angeles Times called a "warmhearted comedic fable" and in which she played the role of Theresa. Manna from Heaven was invited to screen for Congress at the MPAA by Senator Chuck Schumer and Representative Karen McCarthy, and hosted by Jack Valenti.

== Filmography ==
=== Film ===
Year	Title	Role	Notes
1996	Sgt. Bilko	Assistant Casino Manager	
1996	Just Friends	Jane	
1999	Temps	Jane	
2002	Divine Secrets of the Ya-Ya Sisterhood	Sister Solange	Uncredited
2002	Manna from Heaven	Theresa	
2006	Death of a Saleswoman	June Bass	
2007	The Happiest Day of His Life	Catherine	
2015	A Sort of Homecoming	Constance Jones	

=== Television ===
Year	Title	Role	Notes
2002	Strong Medicine	Missy Ahmanson	Episode: "Heartbeat"
2005	The West Wing	Mrs. Creasy	Episode: "365 Days"
2006	The Office	Hannah Smotridge-Barr	Recurring role (season 3)
2007	The War at Home	Donna Schladweiler	Episodes: "Put on a Happy Face", "Take This Job and Bleep It"
2009	Ghost Whisperer	Janet	Episode: "Stage Fright"
2009	Moonshot	Marilyn Lovell	TV film
2009	My Family	Jessica	Episode: "It's Training Men"
2012	Shake It Up	Ms. Andrews	Episode: "Egg It Up"
2012	Happy Endings	Susan	Episode: "Big White Lies"
2012	Criminal Minds	Cynthia Strobl	Episode: "Magnificent Light"
2013	Castle	Maria Cooper	Episode: "Under the Influence"
2013	Spy	Lesley	TV film
2013	Old Guy	Clara	TV series
2013, 2015	Hart of Dixie	Gloria Gainey	Episodes: "I'm Moving On", "On the Road Again", "Alabama Boys"
2014	Rake	Linda Hirschberg	Episodes: "Staple Holes", "Remembrance of Taxis Past"
2014	Black-ish	Candace	Episode: "Crazy Mom"
2015	Jane the Virgin	Danielle Sullivan	Episode: "Chapter 13"
2016	K.C. Undercover	Prosecutor Baker	Episode: "Tightrope of Doom"
2017	Dr. Ken	Kathy	Episode: "Ken and the Basketball Star"
2018	Get Shorty	Tammy	Episode: "Safe Space"
2018	The Dead Girls Detective Agency	Lydia Feldman	Recurring role (seasons 1–2)
2019	Sunnyside	Landrea Orbalyn	Episode: "Dr. Potato"
2019	Truth Be Told	Prof. Simmons	Episode: "Monster"
2021	Curb Your Enthusiasm	Director	Episode: "Man Fights Tiny Woman" (Season 11, Episode 6)

== Other works ==
Year	Title	Notes
1998	Kurt & Courtney	Post-production assistant
1999	Temps	Producer, key makeup artist
2002	Manna from Heaven	Producer, casting director
2007	The Happiest Day of His Life	Producer, director, writer
2008	Letting Go of God	Assistance director
2013	Old Guy	Producer, director, writer
2017	Kings, Queens, & In-Betweens	Producer
2018	Good Eggs	Associate producer
2019	Hope Builders: Making a Difference in the Inland Empire	Producer
2020	Old Guy	Producer, director, writer, casting director
20??	Expiration Date	Producer, director, writer
20??	Half the History - Belinda's Petition	Producer
20??	Half the History - Shirley Chisholm: Catalyst for Change	Producer, director
