= Max Headroom (disambiguation) =

Max Headroom is a fictional computer-generated character played by actor and comedian Matt Frewer.

Max Headroom may also refer to:

- Max Headroom: 20 Minutes into the Future (1985), British telefilm that introduced the character
- The Max Headroom Show (1985–87), video, music and talk show which followed the 1985 telefilm
- Max Headroom (TV series) (1987–88), American satirical science fiction series based on the British telefilm

== See also ==
- Max Headroom signal hijacking
