= Attack of Rufo Chacón =

2019 police brutality incident in Venezuela

Rufo Chacón
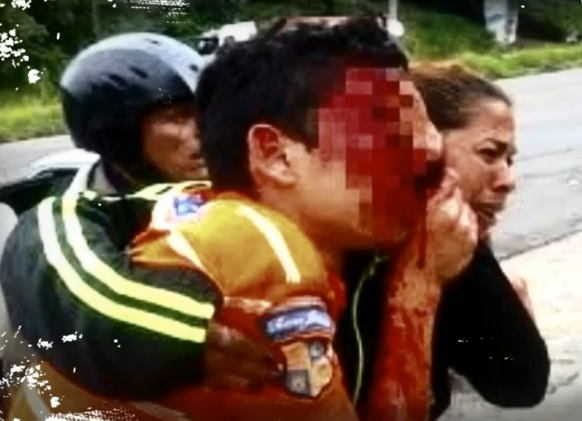
- Born: Rufo Antonio Chacón Parada; 2003 (age 22–23); San Cristóbal, Venezuela
- Occupation: Student

Rufo Antonio Chacón Parada (San Cristóbal, Venezuela, 2003) is a Venezuelan student who lost both eyes on 2 July 2019 due to police brutality during a protest.

== Attack ==
Video of the moment the police open fire at Chacón

On 2 July 2019, aged 16, Chacón lost both of his eyes after being injured by two officers of the Táchira State Police (Politáchira) who shot at him from point-blank range during a protest over lack of domestic gas in the La Fría community of his hometown. According to his mother, Adriana Parada, the police began to shoot and hit the protesters without warning; she went to help her other son, aged 14, who had been hit in the head when the police then pounced on Rufo, one shooting him while another attacked him after he fell to the ground. Parada has reported to the news that her son "lost his eyes because he wanted to help me get back the gas that we need so much" and that now "he wants to die, for me they've ruined his life".

Chacón underwent surgery; he received 52 rubber buckshot pellets to the face, of which eight are in the left eye socket and four in the right. Primary medical reports state that his appearance has been left disfigured by the injuries. The doctor Luis Ramírez, head of the San Cristóbal hospital, stated that Chacón will be permanently blind, as Chacón's eyes were so damaged that doctors could only remove what remained of them. He spent only four days in hospital, as doctors were concerned that the crisis-inflicted relative lack of hygiene at the facility would worsen his condition.

== Aftermath ==
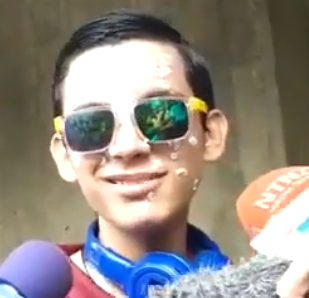
Chacón talking to reporters on 19 July, wearing sunglasses and face cream

Chacón, in speaking to the media, says that he is starting to forget what colors look like, but believes he will regain sight. Because there are pellet fragments lodged too far into his head to remove, Chacón remains at risk for infection; the open wounds of his eye sockets also pose a large infection threat, and so he must cover his upper face in healing cream - with no gas and frequent blackouts there is no air conditioning and flies gather around his face.

Parada had been living and working in nearby Colombia for six months, but returned in late June to attend Chacón's high school graduation, which was to happen a week after the protest; she worries that having to care for him will mean she cannot return to work.

=== Investigations ===
The police officers Javier Blanco and Hanry Ramírez were detained for the attack, and also for hitting another youth of 14 years at the protest. Though the charges are for inflicting head injuries to three young people, Chacón is the one highlighted in media surrounding the trial.

Parada denounced that on 12 July, when attending at court for the first hearing to begin the investigation, she learned that the detained officers had not been under the custody of the Cuerpo de Investigaciones Científicas, Penales y Criminalísticas (CICPC), nor were they under charge of Politáchira, the body they belonged to, but were enjoying protection and illegal free movement without court order.

=== Reactions ===
The governor of Táchira, Laidy Gómez, declared that the state police were being directed to suppress the public under orders from the Minister of Interior and Justice, Néstor Reverol, for 20 months. The director of Politáchira, Jesús Arteaga, acknowledged that in the case of Rufo Chacón there had been violations of human rights on the part of those responsible.

The National Assembly deputy Karim Vera denounced that the police officer who shot the pellets at Chacón's face held the position of head of the Brigade for Public Order in the police force, and had an open file for having committed a similar act in the 2017 protests. The officer seriously injured the youth Ornelly Chacón, also with shots to the face and head, in a peaceful protest in the city of San Juan de Colón, Ayacucho Municipality, Táchira, who spent several days in critical condition in intensive care. Vera pressured the deputies of the Legislative Council of Táchira State to ask the director of Politáchira to explain why the officer was allowed to hold his position and be in charge of controlling demonstrations, knowing of his background.

The Juan Guaidó-appointed Venezuelan ambassador to the Organization of American States, Gustavo Tarre Briceño, described the case of Rufo Chacón as "another example of an inhumane attitude and lack of consideration for respect for the human rights established in the constitution", assuring that an agenda is prepared for delivery to the Inter-American Commission on Human Rights with the aim that representatives of the agency "can have access to all detention centers and places where there are cases of human rights violations in the country." The family commission of the National Assembly declared that it would formally request for a UN human rights delegation in the country, to be appointed by the High Commissioner Michelle Bachelet, in order to begin a thorough investigation into the case of Chacón, and his brother, Adrián Chacón, who was also a victim of police repression.

Social media users started a campaign to help Chacón, where the ophthalmology clinic Barraquer in Bogotá, Colombia, which specializes in cornea transplants, offered to help to treat Chacón, as did the doctor Jeffrey Goldberg of the University of San Diego in California; and the professor of plastic surgery at the University of Pittsburgh, Vijay Gorantla, would study the possibility of performing an eye transplant. Only shortly after the protest his cause was attracting celebrity support, with Don Omar sharing photos of Chacón on Instagram the same night of the attack.

Despite the intentions of several people both inside and outside of Venezuela to support the family financially, Parada has indicated that she has not been contacted by any foreign clinic to propose alternatives that allow her to recover her son's vision.

== Later life ==
Along with the help of several other Venezuelans, the Chacón family managed to establish a food kiosk in their home. However, the mayorship executed reportedly a resolution that ordered the closure of informal establishments and security officials forced them to close the business, leaving them without income.

On 30 May 2021, CICPC officials entered Chacón's home without a search warrant, climbing over a fence to reach Rufo's room and arresting him along with his brother, besides seizing two motorcycles from the family; both were moved to the police headquarters. Rufo was accused of stealing a motorcycle and they were interrogated without the presence of lawyers or relatives. When his mother went to the facilities to look for her children, they told her that the arrest had been "a mistake", and that they could leave if she signed an act. She protested the implausibility of Rufo's accusations of stealing a motorcycle when he is blind.

== In popular media ==
The 2023 film Simón, directed by Venezuelan film maker Diego Vicentini, features a character who is inspired on Rufo Chacón.
