= Blipverts =

Blipverts may refer to:

- "Blipverts" (Max Headroom), the pilot episode of the Max Headroom science fiction genre 1987–1988 TV series
- Blipvert, a fictional high-intensity television commercial technology first discussed in the "Blipverts" pilot of Max Headroom
