= The Max Headroom Show =

English television series

- Genre: Music; Comedy; Talk show
- Created by: George Stone; Rocky Morton; Annabel Jankel
- Directed by: Rocky Morton; Annabel Jankel
- Starring: Matt Frewer
- Country of origin: United Kingdom
- Original language: English
- No. of series: 3
- No. of episodes: 29 + 1 special

Production
- Producer: Peter Wagg
- Editors: Roo Aiken; Paul Whiting
- Running time: 30 minutes (including commercials)
- Production company: Chrysalis Visual Programming

Original release
- Network: Channel 4 (UK); Cinemax (US)
- Release: 6 April 1985 – 10 March 1987

The Max Headroom Show is a television series that debuted in the UK in 1985. It was produced by Carlton TV and aired on Channel 4, with an initial series of 13 shows. It featured actor Matt Frewer playing the role of pseudo-computer-generated talk-show host Max Headroom. It returned in 1986 for a second series of six episodes plus a Christmas special. The final series aired in 1987.

== Series overview ==
Series	Episodes	Originally aired	
Series	Episodes	First aired	Last aired
1	13	6 April 1985	29 June 1985
2	6	13 November 1985 (US); 15 July 1986 (UK)	18 December 1985 (US); 19 August 1986 (UK)
3	10	1 August 1986 (US); 6 January 1987 (UK)	5 December 1986 (US); 10 March 1987 (UK)

== Episodes ==
=== Television movie ===
In order to introduce the character who would host their new music video programme, Channel Four broadcast a short (one-hour) science fiction movie, Max Headroom: 20 Minutes into the Future, which supplied him with a backstory. The events and characters in this movie were never again referred to in music video or talk show versions of Max Headroom. (Two years later, however, the movie was remade into the pilot episode of an American science fiction television series).

=== Series 1 ===
The first series employed Max as a music video host, often interrupting the videos with his commentary and antics. Each programme included hits from the early 1980s and newer releases. The show aired at 6pm every Saturday, giving peak time exposure to many artists who were unknown in the UK at the time whilst still featuring some of the more well-known ones. These included several German bands such as Makromad, Ledernacken and musician Udo Lindenberg, and the Australian band Severed Heads.

=== Series 2 ===
The second series consisted of clips and music videos from the first series plus additional material. Max often had a guest in a lounge bar setting; Max did not appear in the setting, but appeared on a television set placed on the bar top. The interviews were brief, and usually digressed into Max's obsession with golf.

This series was first screened in the US on Cinemax during November and December 1985, with a new voice over introduction by Max: "He's the toast of the town (lightly buttered). He's the non-fattening sugar substitute in your tea. He's a bon vivant, a gaucho amigo, a goomba, a mensch, and the fifth musketeer. He's the apple of your eye and aren't you glad he's here. Direct from a wax and shine at the car-wash around the corner, it's the man of the hour, or for at least a good 30 minutes, Max Headroom."

=== Series 3 ===
The third series added a studio audience with which Max would interact. Max conducted a quiz in which members of the audience participated. Often the announced prize was not awarded, or the quiz was "cut for time" because Max took too long to explain the rules (which changed every week). Most episodes included a performance art act in the studio. Each week featured a special guest, often appearing in the studio, but sometimes appearing remotely on a television screen. Max would often sing comedic jazz or swing songs of his creation. This series premièred in the US between August and December 1986 on Cinemax.

=== Christmas special ===
Between the second and third series, an hour-long special, entitled Max Headroom's Giant Christmas Turkey aired on Channel 4 at 10pm on Boxing Day 1986. This programme had already premiered in the US on 18 December 1986, under the title The Max Headroom Christmas Special and was repeated several times over the holiday period on Cinemax. In the UK, the show was repeated by Channel 4 on Christmas Eve 1988. Chrysallis released a complimentary single named "Merry Christmas Santa Claus (You're A Lovely Guy)" that was performed on the show, with the B-side including another song called "Gimme Shades".

== Spin-offs ==
Following the first mini-season of ABC's Max Headroom science fiction adventure series in the spring of 1987, Cinemax produced another series of talk shows, The Original Max Talking Headroom Show, this time in New York and without British participation. The six-part series aired every two weeks on Cinemax between July 1987 and October 1987, the last two episodes coinciding with the first two of the second season of the sci-fi show. Unlike previous Cinemax episodes of Max, these six were not broadcast in the UK. Two weeks after this Cinemax series ended, the ABC show was cancelled. Max Headroom disappeared from the airwaves. His only further appearances were a couple of leftover ABC episodes broadcast as timeslot-fillers in the spring of 1988, a cameo on Sesame Street around the same time, and another cameo on a Comic Relief programme in the spring of 1989.
