= I Feel Fantastic =

2004 surrealist viral video

- DVD cover of "Android Music Videos Volume 1"
- Produced by: John Bergeron
- Starring: Tara the Android
- Distributed by: YouTube
- Release date: December 26, 2004
- Running time: 3 minutes (full 15 minutes)
- Language: English

"I Feel Fantastic" is a surrealist music video and viral video created by Jhon Bergeron in 2004. It features a humanoid animatronic named Tara the Android, which Bergeron described as an attempt to create "the world's first pop star android". Bergeron produced the five-part video series to promote the animatronic, which was released on his website and also offered as a physical DVD titled "Android Music Videos Volume 1".

One of the videos, titled "Please", was re-uploaded to YouTube in 2009, by the user Creepyblog without context, under the title "I Feel Fantastic". It quickly gained popularity due its uncanny and creepy nature, and it has been subject to Internet theories and commentary by YouTubers. The character Tara has since made unofficial cameo appearances in other media, such as Broadcast Signal Intrusion and Smiling Friends.

== Video ==
"I Feel Fantastic" begins with low-quality footage of an interior shot of a house, featuring an animatronic mannequin named "Tara the Android", dressed in a wig and women's clothing. She repeatedly sings the lines "I feel fantastic, hey hey hey", accompanied by an arpeggiated synth line, while jerking her arms and stiffly turning her head. Tara's wig and clothing change throughout the video. Later, there is an abrupt cut to a shot of a backyard with woodlands scenery. The camera zooms in on the garden before returning to the house, where Tara continues to sing "I feel fantastic, hey hey hey".

== History ==
John Bergeron (Note: The AndroidWorld website states "John Bergeron", although most secondary sources list him as "Jon Bergeron".) built Tara from materials worth approximately $2,000 with the goal of marketing her as the "world's first android music star" and planned to take her act on the road for live shows. The animatronic stands at 5' 10" in height and consists of a metal skeleton and synthetic rubber for "skin". (Note: 7. AndroidWorld prod10) (Note: John Bergeron Android Music Videos website (2006)) Later in 2004, Bergeron added an entity to the antiquated robot-builders information website "AndroidWorld.com", where he offered five downloadable music videos titled Electricity (Metal Version), Brutal Metal, Please, Electricity, and Brutal1. The website also included a DVD version titled "Android Music Videos Volume 1", a mixtape of all five video clips. Bergeron has not released any public updates since 2006.

In 2009, the Please video was re-uploaded to YouTube by the user Creepyblog, under the title "I Feel Fantastic". Creepyblog's description accompanying the video includes a cryptic reference to the Greek legend of Pygmalion, a sculptor from ancient Cyprus who believed that all women were tainted and unworthy of love. It quickly went viral and reached over 6 million views. In 2015, the Russian YouTuber Brand-Smetana uploaded the DVD version, which, according to Smetana, is the "complete" version with a length of almost 15 minutes.

== Legacy ==
Tara the Android from I Feel Fantastic has made cameos in other media, including Broadcast Signal Intrusion (pictured).

"I Feel Fantastic" gained its popularity in the early 2010s due its uncanny and creepy nature. Many people have theorised about this video, with the most popular being that Tara's creator was a murderer who made Tara wear his victims' clothes and that the backyard shown in the video is where he buried his victims. "I Feel Fantastic" has been subject to commentary by YouTubers including Michael Stevens of Vsauce in a video discussing "why are things creepy?" and PewDiePie in a reaction video about "weird" web videos. (Note: Felix Kjellberg "TRY NOT TO GET WEIRDED OUT CHALLENGE! (PewDiePie React)". via YouTube. 9 June 2016 at 2:25)

The character Tara the Android has since made unofficial cameo appearances in other media. In an interview, American film director Jacob Gentry cited "I Feel Fantastic" and the Max Headroom signal hijackings as inspiration for his 2021 film Broadcast Signal Intrusion. A depiction of Tara, voiced by Erica Lindbeck, can be seen in the fourth episode of the second season of Smiling Friends, titled "Um, the boss finds love?"

== See also ==
- "Evil" (Interpol song)
- Grave Robbing for Morons
- Possibly in Michigan
- Tonetta
- Username:666
