= Simón (2018 film) =

- Film poster
- Directed by: Diego Vicentini
- Written by: Diego Vicentini
- Produced by: Yulia Safonova
- Starring: Christian McGaffney; Kelley Mack; Steve Wilcox; Alexandra Hoover
- Cinematography: Romas Usakovas
- Edited by: Diego Vicentini
- Music by: Freddy Sheinfeld
- Production company: Wear a Hat Productions
- Release date: November 13, 2018 (Camerimage Film Festival)
- Running time: 36 minutes
- Country: United States
- Languages: English; Spanish
- Budget: $30,000

Simón is a 2018 short drama film directed by Venezuelan filmmaker Diego Vicentini. The film is about a young Venezuelan who is seeking asylum in the United States, though his heart remains in the protests back home. It was created following the 2017 student protests, hoping to raise awareness of the crisis in Venezuela around the world.

== Synopsis ==
During the student protests in Venezuela during 2017, young Simón, who feels threatened in his home country, flees to the United States, but finds the asylum process difficult. Beyond this, the film does not focus on a single character, seeking to represent many, as it looks to raise awareness of the humanitarian crisis in Venezuela, as well as the 2017 Venezuelan protests and the United States asylum process.

== Cast ==
- Christian McGaffney as Simón
- Kelley Mack as Melissa
- Steve Wilcox as Dr. Moore
- Alexandra Hoove as Mrs. Moore
- Ruben Guevara as Alejandro
- Jorge Borrelli as the pharmacist
- Roberto Jaramillo as Chucho
- Gian Franco Rodriguez as student protestor

== Production ==
In October 2017, Vicentini, then a student in California, saw the protests unfolding from videos and social media. He says that this experience was "surreal" and like "a double life"; that he could watch the videos and be very worried, but then leave the house and "little birds were singing; everything was nice and quiet". This difference is what made Vicentini feel "the duty" to make the short film.

The film was shot in March 2018, in Los Angeles, and was originally Vicentini's thesis for his master's degree in Cinema. It was filmed over five days and is mostly in English, starring Venezuelan actor Christian McGaffney among a cast of Americans.

The title of the film is for the Venezuelan liberator, Simón Bolívar, evoking his heroism. Vicentini chose this title as an acknowledgement of all the young people involved in protests against the Nicolás Maduro government, saying they "are all 'mini liberators' because they fought for the freedom of Venezuela", emphasizing that many died, were injured, kidnapped, and tortured. He notes that these protesters are anonymous, so "each of them is a Simón".

In 2019, Vicentini and Marcel Rasquin began fundraising to make a feature film of the story.

A feature film was shot in 2021 and released in 2023. The main cast included Luis Silva, Prakiti Maduro, Franklin Virgüez, José Ramón Barreto and Christian McGaffney.

== Reception ==
Simón has been screened in many countries and festivals around the world. It was given a "festival tour" for a year before being released digitally. The profits of tickets sold during limited releases went to the Chamos foundation, supporting children in Venezuela; Vicentini met with Chamos representatives in Madrid. The limited release screening tour was set up after the trailer went viral.
