= Venezuelan cinema in the 2020s =

In 2020, the International Film Festival Rotterdam presented the feature film La Fortaleza by Jorge Thielen Armand in the Tiger Competition; La Fortaleza is the first Venezuelan title compete in this A-list festival.

In 2023, the Venezuelan Academy of Motion Picture Arts and Sciences chose Simón, directed by Diego Vicentini, to represent Venezuela in the 38th Goya Awards. On 30 November, Simón was officially nominated to the 38th Goya Awards in the Best Ibero-American Film category.

== See also ==
- Simón (2023 film)
