= Headroom =

Headroom or HeadRoom may refer to:

- Vertical clearance, in engineering, the maximum distance overhead (the difference between the structure gauge and the loading gauge)
- Headroom (audio signal processing), the difference between the nominal signal value and the maximum undistorted value
- Headroom (photographic framing), in camera work, the space between the top of the head and the upper frame limit
- Headroom (Bleu album), an album by alt-rock musician Bleu
- Headroom (Don McLean album)
- Head Room or Headroom, alternate name for Direct to Disc (FM album)
- "Head Room", a song by 10cc from their 1976 album How Dare You!
- Max Headroom (disambiguation), fictional artificial intelligence character, and associated appearances
- Helix HeadRoom, DOS memory management software by Helix Software Company
