= Kelley Mack =

American actress (1992–2025)

- Born: Kelley Lynne Klebenow; July 10, 1992; Cincinnati, Ohio, U.S.
- Died: August 2, 2025 (aged 33); Cincinnati, Ohio, U.S.
- Education: Hinsdale Central High School
- Alma mater: Chapman University
- Occupation: Actress
- Years active: 2008–2025
- Agent: Julie Smith
- Notable work: The Walking Dead, Spider-Verse
- Relatives: Parker Mack (brother)

Kelley Lynne Klebenow (July 10, 1992 – August 2, 2025), known professionally as Kelley Mack, was an American actress. She played Addy in season 9 of the series The Walking Dead (2018–2019). She also had roles in Profile (2018) and Broadcast Signal Intrusion (2021), and voiced Gwen Stacy/Spider-Woman as voice double for Hailee Steinfeld in the Spider-Man: Into the Spider-Verse (2018), Spider-Man: Across the Spider-Verse (2023), and promotional material.

== Early life and education ==
Kelley Lynne Klebenow was born in Cincinnati on July 10, 1992, and had two younger siblings, including actor Parker Mack. Her parents were Kristen and Lindsay Klebenow. Her family moved frequently throughout her childhood. She began acting as a child, appearing in television commercials such as Dr. Pepper, Ross Stores, Dairy Queen, and Chick-fil-A. After graduating from Hinsdale Central High School in Illinois, she attended the Dodge College of Film and Media Arts at Chapman University, where she studied cinematography.

== Career ==
Mack worked in television, appearing on The Walking Dead, 9-1-1, and Chicago Med. She also appeared in films, including Broadcast Signal Intrusion. At the time of her death, Universal, a film in which she starred and executive produced, was yet to be released. Mack's last television commercial was for Rakuten with her mother.

== Personal life, illness, and death ==
Mack was in a relationship with Logan Lanier.

In January 2025, Mack announced she had been diagnosed with astrocytoma, a brain tumor that is a form of glioma. By April 2025, she had completed proton radiation treatment. Mack died in Cincinnati on August 2, 2025, at the age of 33. A memorial service was held on August 16 at the Glendale Lyceum in Glendale, Ohio. The family is also planning a celebration of her life for a future date in Los Angeles for her friends and colleagues in the area.

== Filmography ==
=== Film ===
Year	Title	Role	Notes	Ref(s)
2008	The Elephant Garden	Chloe	Short film written and directed by Sasie Sealy	
2015	Positive	Catherine	Short film also written, produced, directed, edited by Mack	
2015	Safe and Sound	Sydney	Short film directed by Isaiah Shinn	
2016	The Perfect One	Lucy Canon	Short film directed by Hisonni Mustafa	
2016	Not Your Average Joe	Sabrina Jones	Short film written and directed by Dennis Larkin	
2016	The Lost	Stacey	Short film directed by Victor Valerio	
2016	A Knock at the Door	Sara	Short film written and directed by Katrina Rennells & Wendie Weldon (also produced and edited by Mack)	
2016	Wheels on the Bus	Maggie	Adventure film directed by A.J. Bishop	
2017	Exposure	Pilar	Short film written and directed by Larin Sullivan	
2017	Slices of Life VR	Christina	Short film directed by Céline Tricart	
2018	Profile	Converted female	Thriller film directed by Timur Bekmambetov based on In the Skin of a Jihadist by Anna Érelle	
2018	Annie & Peter	Annie	Short film written and directed by Alex Alcheh	
2018	Long Distance Trip	Becca	Comedy film written and directed by Shelley Dennis	
2018	Simón	Melissa Moore	Short film written and directed by Diego Vicentini	
2018	Spider-Man: Into the Spider-Verse	Gwen Stacy / Spider-Woman	Voice double for Hailee Steinfeld	
2019	Violet	Katie	Short film directed by Rafael Hernán Gamboa	
2019	Vincent	Lia	Short film directed by Xueou Yu	
2021	Lulu	Dom	Short film directed by Chester Howie	
2021	Broadcast Signal Intrusion	Alice	Horror suspense film directed by Jacob Gentry	
2021	Shot in the Dark	Sheryl Johns	Drama film directed by Keene McRae	
2023	Spider-Man: Across the Spider-Verse	Gwen Stacy / Spider-Woman	Voice double for Hailee Steinfeld	
2024	My Own Silence	Kenzie	Short film written and directed by Matthew James Eberle	
2024	Mr. Manhattan	Tina	Romantic film directed by Brian Herzlinger	
2024	Delicate Arch	Wilda	Horror film written and directed by Matthew Warren	
2025	Universal	Ricky	Science fiction film directed by Stephen Portland	

=== Television ===
Year	Title	Role	Notes	Ref(s)
2015	Unusual Suspects	Paige Andreas	Episode: "Last Dance"	
2015	Grayson: Earth One	Smirk	Miniseries: Episode: "The Boy and the Bullet"	
2017	Nasty Habits	Mia	Episode: "Rookie"	
2018	EverReady	Candice	Miniseries: Episode: "Chapter Two: Double Booked"	
2018	Unscrewed	Talia	Television pilot	
2018	Coventry	Morgan	TV mini-series (4 episodes)	
2018–2019	The Walking Dead	Addy	Recurring role, 5 episodes	
2019	The AM Archives	Alice Michaels	Podcast series	
2019	9-1-1	Random woman	Episode: "Sink or Swim"	
2020	Schooled	Danielle	Episode: "Lainey's Mom"	
2020	The College Tapes	Alice Michaels	Podcast series	
2022	Chicago Med	Penelope Jacobs	Episode: "Mama Said There Would Be Days Like This"	

== See also ==
- List of Chapman University alumni
