= Broadcast Signal Intrusion =

- Promotional release poster
- Directed by: Jacob Gentry
- Written by: Phil Drinkwater; Tim Woodall
- Produced by: Greg Newman; Giles Edwards; Nicola Goelzhaeuser; Brett Hays
- Starring: Harry Shum Jr. Chris Sullivan; Kelley Mack; Steve Pringle; Justin Welborn
- Cinematography: Scott Thiele
- Music by: Ben Lovett
- Production company: Queensbury Pictures
- Distributed by: MPI Media Group/Dark Sky Films
- Release dates: March 16, 2021 (SXSW); October 22, 2021 (limited, VOD)
- Running time: 104 minutes
- Country: United States
- Language: English

Broadcast Signal Intrusion is a 2021 horror suspense film directed by Jacob Gentry. The film focuses on a man investigating the phenomenon of broadcast signal intrusions, which may be related to disappearances.

== Plot ==
James is a video archivist working for a local television station, and still grieving the mysterious disappearance of his wife named Hannah three years earlier, James buries himself in work, spending his nights digitizing old broadcast tapes. One evening, while reviewing footage, he discovers a strange and disturbing broadcast signal intrusion, a pirate video interrupting regular programming. The clip shows a person wearing a distorted white rubber mask and speaking in a garbled, unintelligible voice. The strange visuals creep James out, stirring something deep and uncomfortable inside him.

Curious and increasingly obsessed, James begins researching the origin of the intrusion. He discovers that similar broadcast signal intrusions occurred in late 1987 and the early 1990s, all unsolved. Even more disturbing, these incidents seem to coincide with the disappearances of several women, one of whom bears a strong resemblance to Hannah. This connection deepens James's fixation, and what begins as a curiosity quickly turns into a personal mission.

His investigation leads him to a range of eccentric and secretive figures, and he contacts a former FCC investigator named Dr. Stuart Lithgow. As James pieces together clues, he starts to believe that the videos were created by someone attempting to send a message or expose a sinister truth possibly about a group known as the "Nite Pirates" who were rumored to be behind some of the original intrusions. Stuart dismisses James's investigation, saying the case had already been abandoned and was too difficult to solve. In the night, he meets Alice, a mysterious young woman with her own troubled past, who becomes a temporary companion in his search for answers. Together, they follow a trail of clues hidden within the footage, including Morse code, odd audio signals, and phone numbers embedded in the video.

As James digs deeper, his grip on reality begins to fray. He becomes paranoid, convinced he's being followed, and begins seeing hallucinations of masked figures from the tapes. Alice eventually disappears without a trace, leaving James further isolated. His quest becomes more dangerous as he tracks down the location believed to be the source of the third tape, a previously unknown intrusion video of an abandoned farmhouse.

Inside the farmhouse, James finds a man named Michael Gardiner, who appears to be mentally unstable and possibly connected to the broadcast intrusions. James is now fully consumed by his obsession and had planned to rebuild the hijack setting that Michael used during his crime. Restraining him, James forces him to reenact the original broadcast hijacked setting, dressing him in the same mask that he used on the victims and demanding a confession. Whether Michael is truly guilty remains ambiguous, but James kills him, convinced that he has found the person responsible for both the videos and perhaps even his wife's disappearance.

On the drive back to the city, James begins to hallucinate more intensely. He sees and hears broadcast interference in his car's radio, but suddenly, he hits something on the road - a young woman standing in the dark - and he investigates, her face appearing artificial, almost robotic, with black liquid oozing from her mouth.

== Cast ==
- Harry Shum Jr. as James
- Chris Sullivan as Phreaker
- Steve Pringle as Dr. Stuart Lithgow
- Justin Welborn as Michael
- Kelley Mack as Alice
- Jennifer Jelsema as Nora
- James Swanton as SAL-E Sparx
- Michael B. Woods as MacAlister
- Arif Yampolsky as Chester
- Madrid St. Angelo as Proprietor

== Production ==
From left to right, Tara the Android from the I Feel Fantastic video, and the robot from Broadcast Signal Intrusion

Director Jacob Gentry was intrigued by the film's premise upon reading the script, as he found broadcast signal intrusions fascinating. Gentry has stated that creepypastas and videos such as the 2004 video I Feel Fantastic were inspirations for the film, as were real life broadcast signal intrusions such as the 1987 Max Headroom signal hijacking and Alan J. Pakula’s films Klute, The Parallax View, and All The President’s Men.

== Release ==
Broadcast Signal Intrusion premiered on March 16, 2021 at the South by Southwest Film Festival. Later, the movie was screened at multiple festivals, including Fantasia International Film Festival in Canada, London FrightFest Film Festival in the United Kingdom, and Sitges Fim Festival in Spain.

The movie was set for a limited theatrical and VOD release in the USA on October 22, 2021.

The movie can be streamed on AMC+.

== Reception ==
Broadcast Signal Intrusion holds a rating of 69% on Rotten Tomatoes, based on 62 reviews, with the critics' consensus stating "Broadcast Signal Intrusion struggles to satisfactorily resolve its setup, but for much of its runtime, it offers an intriguing, well-acted diversion for horror fans." Common elements of praise centered on the film's atmosphere, which was praised by outlets such as Variety and RogerEbert.com. The performance of Harry Shum Jr. was also frequently singled out for praise. Horror website Bloody Disgusting rated the film at 2 1/2 out of 5 skulls, writing that it "wears its cinematic influences on its sleeves, delivering a heavily stylized mystery that rings hollow." Alexandra Heller-Nicholas of Alliance of Women Film Journalists pointed out that "This movie is no clear-cut, legible missing person mystery, as its ambitions are far, far greater than that: it is a film about grief, about obsession, and about our susceptibility to conspiracy theories to fill the void at a time when emptiness reigns supreme. And on this front, Broadcast Signal Intrusion – with all its ambiguities, ellipses and poetic elisions – is both unique and rewarding, if only for a more discerning audience who doesn’t want or need their themes spoon-fed to them."
