= Simón (2023 film) =

2023 film by Diego Vicentini

- Theatrical release poster
- Directed by: Diego Vicentini
- Written by: Diego Vicentini
- Produced by: Jorge González; Marcel Rasquin; Diego Vicentini
- Starring: Christian McGaffney
- Cinematography: Horacio Martinez
- Edited by: Diego Vicentini
- Music by: Freddy Sheinfeld
- Production company: Black Hole Enterprises
- Release dates: April 15, 2023 (Florida Film Festival); September 7, 2023 (Venezuela)
- Running time: 99 minutes
- Countries: Venezuela; United States
- Languages: Spanish; English

Simón is a 2023 drama film written, directed, co-produced and edited by Venezuelan filmmaker Diego Vicentini. It is about a young Venezuelan protester, Simón, who, after being arrested and tortured during protests in his country, flees the country and seeks asylum in Miami, where he must decide whether to stay in the city or return to Venezuela. As filming took place during the COVID-19 pandemic, precautions were introduced, including frequent testing of the cast and crew, the strict use of masks and set sterilization between scenes, which added unforeseen costs to the production. Premiered at the Florida Film Festival, the feature film has received multiple awards, including Best Feature Film at the Venezuelan Film Festival and Best Narrative Feature at the Heartland International Film Festival. Simón was nominated for the 38th Goya Awards in the Best Ibero-American Film category.

== Plot ==
During the protests in Venezuela, Simón (Christian McGaffney) and his companions are arrested and tortured. Forced to flee Venezuela, he becomes an asylum seeker and heads to Miami. Immigration informs him that once he is granted asylum, he will not be able to return to his country. Simón faces both trauma and guilt and must make the decision whether to stay in Miami and start a new life or return home to face tyranny.

== Cast ==
- Christian McGaffney as Simón
- Roberto Jaramillo as Chucho
- Jana Nawartschi as Melissa
- Franklin Virgüez as Colonel Lugo
- Luis Silva as Joaquín
- Jorge Roguez as Sebastian
- Prakriti Maduro as Helena
- Pedro Pablo Porras as Main Guard
- Sallie Glaner as Dr. Moore
- Conlan Kisilewicz as Jordan
- Carlos Guerrero as Papo
- Sofia Riba as Chloe
- Gabriel Bonilla as Pharacist Helson
- José Ramón Barreto as Antonio
- Wynn Reichert as Professor
- Mike Boland as Mateo

== Production ==
The director, Diego Vicentini, produced a short film of the same name about the protests in Venezuela in 2017 as part of his thesis for his master's degree in film at the Los Angeles Film School. The short was released in 2018 in eight countries, and Vicentini decided to turn it into a feature film in the face of the unexpected positive reception. For the role of the protagonist, the director originally needed a bilingual Venezuelan in his twenties, which limited the options. Vicentini opted for the lead the same actor that he cast for the short film, Christian McGaffney. Vicentini commented that he chose the name "Simón" to "attribute Bolívar's mythology to all these young people who are anonymous". In 2019, Vicentini and Marcel Rasquin (also a film director who was later the producer of Simón) began fundraising to make a feature film of the story. Simón is Diego Vicentini's debut feature film. He had written a total of 18 versions of the script prior to choosing a final version.

The shooting of the feature film coincided with the COVID-19 pandemic, which meant several logistical complications: the cast and crew were tested every three days, the use of masks was strict and the set was sterilized between scenes, representing additional and unforeseen costs for the production. In addition, there was the risk of the lead actor Christian McGaffney getting sick, resulting in the modification of a scene set in a crowded Miami nightclub, and the scene reduced the amount of extras from 250 to 30. The film was shot over the course of 28 days in 23 different locations.

The prison setting was filmed in Redland, near Homestead, in southern Florida, where there is an abandoned city with deteriorating buildings. Actor Franklin Virgüez commented in an interview that he used the Stanislavski method to film the interrogation scene: when he moved from Barquisimeto to Caracas, he initially lived in a shanty house in Monte Piedad, on a hill where rats abounded and where he developed a phobia of them, so he imagined rats on Christian during the scene to evoke the desired emotions. The film also featured a character inspired by Rufo Chacón, a 20-year old protester who lost both eyes after being shot with pellets in the face by police officers.

== Release ==
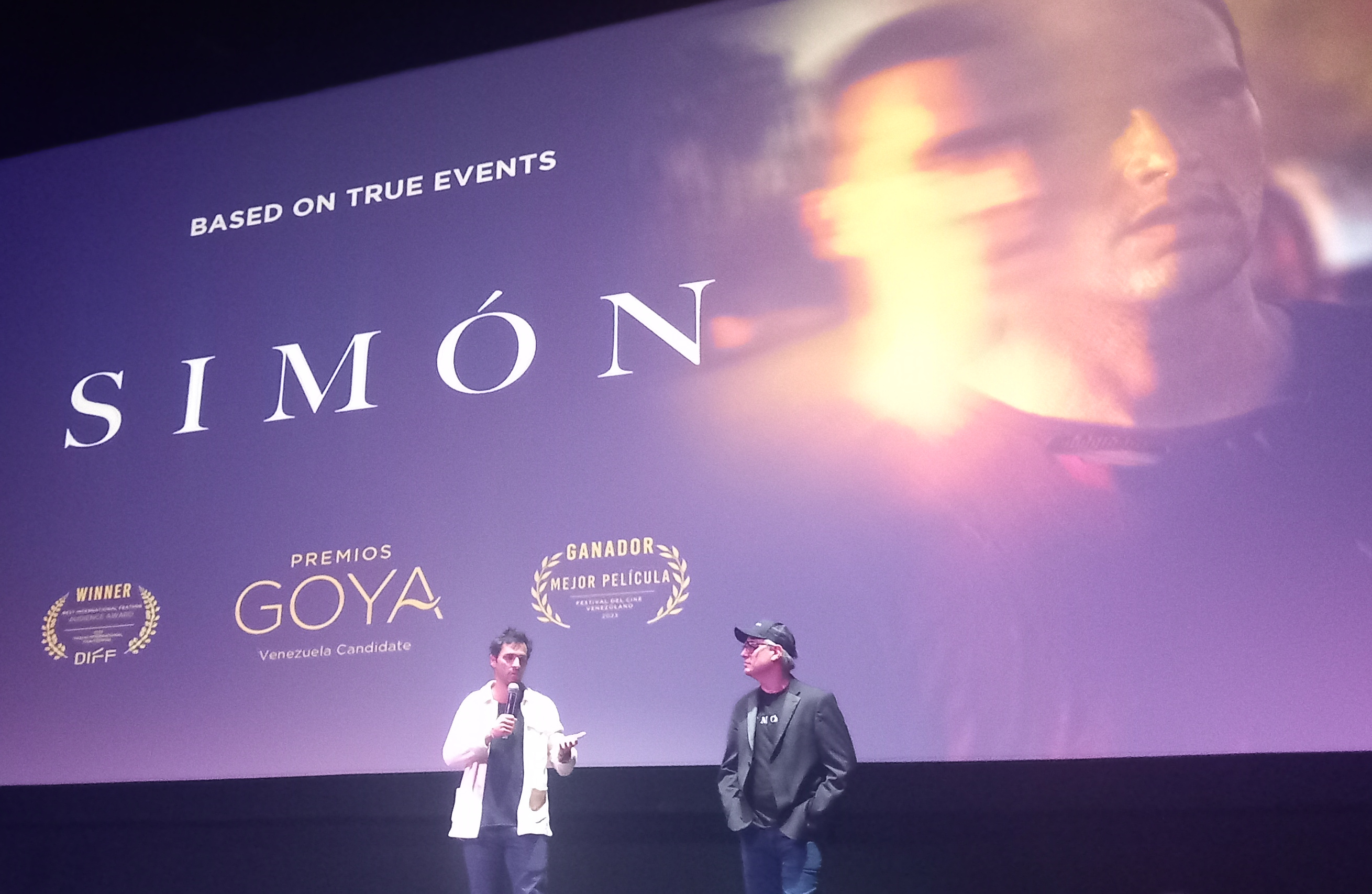
Director Diego Vicentini (left) and producer Jorge González (right) at Simón's screening on 13 September 2023 in Madrid, Spain.

The feature film premiered on 15 April 2023 at the Florida Film Festival in Orlando, and was subsequently screened at the Dallas International Film Festival. The movie premiered in July 2023 at the Venezuelan Film Festival.

Two days before its commercial release, Venezuelan outlets reported that a complaint was filed against the film in Venezuela's Public Ministry to prevent it from being screened in theaters, accusing it of promoting violence in the country. The following day, director Diego Vicentini announced that up to that date, he and his team had not received any notification or complaint against its screening in Venezuela and that the premiere was still scheduled for the same date.

Simón was commercially released on 7 September 2023 in Venezuela, in at least 34 theaters nationwide. For its international premiere, tickets in Madrid, Buenos Aires, Santiago de Chile and New York were sold out days before its screening. In Madrid, it became the Venezuelan feature film with the largest screening in Spain, with over 1,000 tickets sold. By the end of the year, the film had become the highest-grossing film in Venezuela in the last six years, since 2016, after Papita 2da base.

It was announced that Simón would be available in Netflix starting in March 2024.

== Reception ==
By August 2023, Simón had a 100% perfect score in Rotten Tomatoes. According to El Nacional, it was arguably the first time that a Venezuelan film had achieved the feat. Luis Bond, from Diario las Américas, gave the film a 4 out of 5 rating and wrote, "It talks to us about the need to forgive —and forgive ourselves— to move forward, pointing out the fine line between running away and moving forward, resignation and acceptance, forgiveness and forgetting". Abhishek Sharma, in Film Threat, rated the movie 8/10 and said, "Simón leaves us with a strong message that relays the hard-hitting reflection on reality." Mike Massie wrote that the film was "not particularly creative, artistic, or original", though he noted that it was "a rare theatrical examination of tremendously important international conflicts and notions, which ought to be seen, even if the entertainment value of this specific project is medial", rating the film 6/10. In The Independent Critic, Richard Propes stated that "McGaffney gives a riveting performance destined to be one of the year's finest." Alan French, from Sunshine State Cineplex, wrote, "With a story as important as this one, Simón needed to show the true horrors of the dissident experience. Along the way, Vicentini proves himself one of the best young filmmakers on the rise."

Simón was nominated for the Grand Jury Award for Best Narrative Feature at the Florida Film Festival and won the Audience Award Winner for Best International Narrative Feature at the 2023 Dallas International Film Festival. At the Venezuelan Film Festival, the film received multiple awards, including "Best Feature", "Best Director", "Best Supporting Actor" (for Franklin Virgüez), "Best Cinematography", "Best Editing" and "Best Screenplay". The film was not chosen as the country's candidate for the Academy Awards (the Oscars), obtaining 10 votes in favor, 12 against and two abstentions, which proved controversial at the time. On 25 September 2023, the Academy of Motion Picture Arts and Sciences, which presents the Academy Awards, asked to add the film's screenplay to its permanent library collection. On 17 October, Simón was awarded the Grand Prize for Best Narrative Feature at the Heartland International Film Festival. The Venezuelan Academy of Motion Picture Arts and Sciences chose Simón to represent Venezuela in the 38th Goya Awards. On 30 November, Simón was officially nominated to the 38th Goya Awards in the Best Ibero-American Film category.

=== Accolades ===
Year	Award / Film Festival	Category	Recipient(s)	Result
2023	Dallas International Film Festival	Best International Narrative Feature	Simón	Nominated
2023	Florida Film Festival	Best Narrative Feature	Simón	Won
2023	Heartland International Film Festival	Best Narrative Feature	Simón	Won
2023	Venezuelan Film Festival	Best Feature Film	Simón	Won
2023	Venezuelan Film Festival	Best Director	Diego Vicentini	Won
2023	Venezuelan Film Festival	Best Supporting Actor	Franklin Virgüez	Won
2023	Venezuelan Film Festival	Best Cinematography	Horacio Martínez	Won
2023	Venezuelan Film Festival	Best Editing	Diego Vicentini	Won
2023	Venezuelan Film Festival	Best Screenplay	Diego Vicentini	Won
2024	38th Goya Awards	Best Ibero-American Film	Simón	Nominated
2024	11th Platino Awards	Best Ibero-American Debut Film	Simón	Nominated

== See also ==
- List of Venezuelan films
- Venezuelan cinema in the 2020s
