= Red Room Curse =

Japanese Internet urban legend

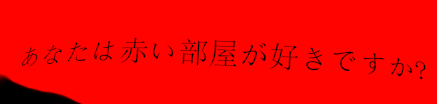
Depiction of the pop-up ad, asking "Do you like the red room?"

The Red Room Curse (Japanese: 赤い部屋, Hepburn: Akai heya) is an early Japanese Internet urban legend about a red pop-up ad which announces the forthcoming death of the person who encounters it on their computer screen. It may have its origin in an Adobe Flash horror animation of the late 1990s that tells the story of the legend.

== Legend ==
While browsing the Internet, the victim will be presented with a red pop-up with text saying "Do you like | ?" (Japanese: あなたは～好きですか?, romanized: Anata wa ~ sukidesuka?). The pop-up will reappear after trying to close it, with text coming out of the vertical line. Over time, the sentence will be completed, reading "Do you like the red room?" (Japanese: あなたは赤い部屋が好きですか?, romanized: Anata wa akai heya ga sukidesuka?).

Variations of the legend differ on what happens next. According to the most common one, the screen will turn red, displaying a list of names of the Red Room's victims. The target will sense a mysterious presence behind them, after which they will lose consciousness. They will later be found dead in their home, with the walls of the room in which they are discovered "painted red with blood". A lesser known variation states that the target will instead have a crack appear somewhere on their body which quickly grows in size, splitting them apart.

== Origin and spread ==
In the late 1990s, a Japanese interactive Adobe Flash horror animation, considered to be the origin of the Red Room Curse urban legend, was uploaded to GeoCities. It told the story of a young boy who was cursed and died after seeing the pop-up. The legend of the curse gained notoriety in 2004 due to the Sasebo slashing – the murder of a 12-year-old schoolgirl by an 11-year-old classmate referred to as "Girl A" at an elementary school in Sasebo. "Girl A" was reported to be a fan of the Red Room Curse animation, having the video bookmarked on her computer at the time of the murder. The webpage in question is no longer live.

A short film titled The Red Room Curse inspired by the urban legend was released in 2016.

== See also ==
- Username:666
