= Username:666 =

2008 YouTube video

Username:666 (A cursed video on Niconico)
- The thumbnail of "Username:666"
- Produced by: PiroPito (a.k.a. nana825763)
- Distributed by: YouTube (Username:666), Niconico (A cursed video on Niconico)
- Release date: February 26, 2008
- Running time: 3 minutes (7 minutes for "A cursed video on Niconico")
- Country: Japan

Username:666, initially uploaded to Niconico as A cursed video on Niconico (ニコニコ呪いの動画, Nikoniko Noroi No Dōga, or simply and most commonly sm666) is a Japanese horror or creepypasta screenlife YouTube video uploaded on February 26, 2008. Created by PiroPito (ぴろぴと, known online as nana825763), it shows a fictional scenario where an internet user tries to visit the user "666" on YouTube, and refreshes until they are taken to a heavily distorted, hellish version of the website that features the channel. In 2022, there was a bug where if one changed the YouTube URL, it would redirect to one of the fictional user's videos.

== Video ==
An unseen computer user attempts to visit a YouTube channel URL (www.youtube.com/666) with the name bearing the number of the beast. The account is shown as suspended, but the user continues to refresh the page a few times. Slowly, the layout of the site begins changing and taking on a sinister appearance, until the user is suddenly taken to a heavily distorted and visceral version of the website, with the channel now accessible. The user then goes through the channel's videos - all of which contain similarly bizarre imagery - and before clicking on the last one, they are greeted with a blank pop-up window, which they proceed to click on. The user tries to escape by pausing the video, closing the browser, clicking the back button on the browser, using Task Manager, and shutting down the computer, but none of these methods work. At the end, a hand comes out of the YouTube video player and the footage cuts out.

== Background ==
PiroPito (ぴろぴと; born 4 October 1977), better known by their online handle nana825763, is a Japanese surrealist filmmaker, game developer, and let's player. He is best known for "Username:666" and other horror videos, such as "Another YouTube" and "my house walk-through". PiroPito has been uploading videos to YouTube since 2006. In an article by BuzzFeed News, Rachael Krishna praised his Minecraft Let's Play videos for being charming.

In an interview with PiroPito, he stated that he's inspired by "various films and novels, cult films, avant-garde films, surrealist films and paintings, dreams and the unconscious", and artists like "Shuji Terayama, Brothers Quay, Schwann Kmeier, Yasutaka Tsutsui, Kobo Abe, Yumeno Kyusaku, Greenaway, Suzan Pitt, Andre Breton, Max Ernst, Shigeru Mizuki". Since 2019, PiroPito started making the game Metaphysical Region, with a trailer releasing in 2023. The game is still in development to this day.

== History ==
Username:666 was based on "A cursed video on Niconico" (ニコニコ呪いの動画, Nikoniko Noroi No Dōga), which PiroPito made for the Slashup05 (slashup05 熱冬祭 MovieBattle, slashup05 netsufuyusai MovieBattle) flash movie festival. The plot is similar; The user attempts to watch the video "sm666" on Niconico, only for an error message that says the video can not be found to show up. The user then refreshes, the layout changes with the text becoming mojibake (like this; ﾎｱｼ鯏讀ﾋｻ荀ｬ) in the process, until they are taken to the watch page with similar effects to YouTube in the later video. After the user tries to escape, the danmaku comments read "No escape" (逃ｻﾅｲ, noga sanai) before the last one slowly appears; "Behind you" (オマエ、ノ、ウシロ, omae, no, ushiro). As that happens, the same hand appears (although with different color grading), and the video freezes (save for one of the banner ads, which might've been an oversight) before fading out. The video also includes a full-screen version of the last few minutes of the video for the last 6 minutes. The URL is discovered at the very beginning of posts consisting of mojibake on deleted threads on 2channel posted from November 6 to 8 at 12:00 AM. "A cursed video on Niconico" was uploaded on December 28, 2007.

In Japan, both "A cursed video on Niconico" and "Username:666" went viral in the months following the original video upload. Its status as a viral legend has become well-known on the internet. YouTube banned an account named "666" as a reference to the original short, which it lifted in early 2024. In 2022, there was a bug where if the user changed the YouTube URL "https://www.youtube.com/watch?v=[string]" of any video and removed the letter "h" in it, it would redirect to a poorly recreated version of the first looped clip in the Username:666 video. In August 2025, the original 666 account commented "O_o" on the username:666 video, which later got pinned. On December 2025, the 666 account also commented "Awesome!" on a YouTube short by nana825763 depicting the 666 region in nana825763's upcoming game, Metaphysical Region.

== Reception ==
Bloody Disgusting called the soundtrack "[A] simple bit of digital trickery was so creepy that some internet users still insist that it’s based on real paranormal phenomena." Screen Rant said "Username:666 is an excellent example of early viral internet horror, and those nostalgic for YouTube's early days may want to give this one a watch." Blumhouse Productions called it "truly terrifying."

== See also ==
- I Feel Fantastic
- Red Room Curse
