= Grave Robbing for Morons =

- A still from Grave Robbing for Morons
- Starring: "Anthony"
- Running time: 26 minutes
- Country: United States

Grave Robbing for Morons is an American short film that purports to serve as a tutorial on grave robbing and body snatching, most likely created in the late 1980s or early 1990s. After being uploaded to YouTube as early as 2009, the film has been the subject of a viral Internet phenomenon, with users of sites such as Reddit involved in a collaborative effort to identify its authors.

== Overview ==
Grave Robbing for Morons features a man bragging about his grave robbing, presenting other human remains he owns to the camera. In 2009, it was featured on a bootleg DVD collection of four disturbing short films, titled Ensuring Your Place in Hell.

Despite online communities' efforts to identify the people responsible for creating Grave Robbing for Morons, they remain anonymous. The authenticity of the film as a genuine tutorial made by a real grave robber is also debated.

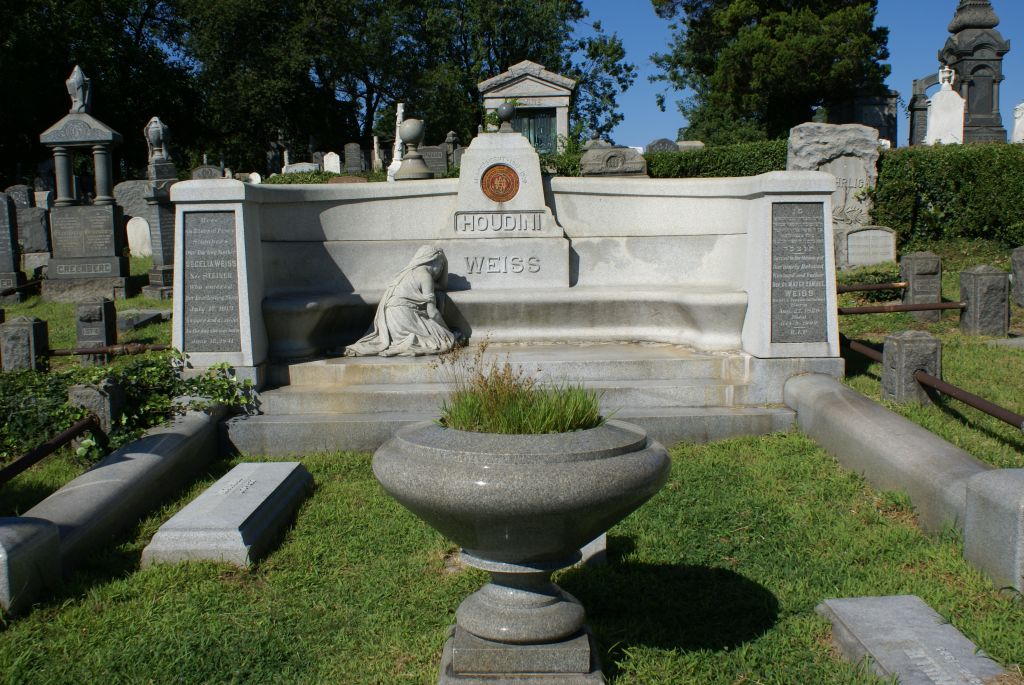
"Anthony" mentioned planning to raid the grave of Harry Houdini at the Machpelah Cemetery in New York City

Grave Robbing for Morons was referenced in academic discussions concerning the public's reaction to grave robbing. The film inspired a found footage horror short film Grave Robbing For Morons II: Dead by Dawn (2024), directed by Josh Folan.

== See also ==
- I Feel Fantastic
