= Colón, Venezuela =

Coordinates: 8.0377778°N 72.2519444°W

San Juan de Colón
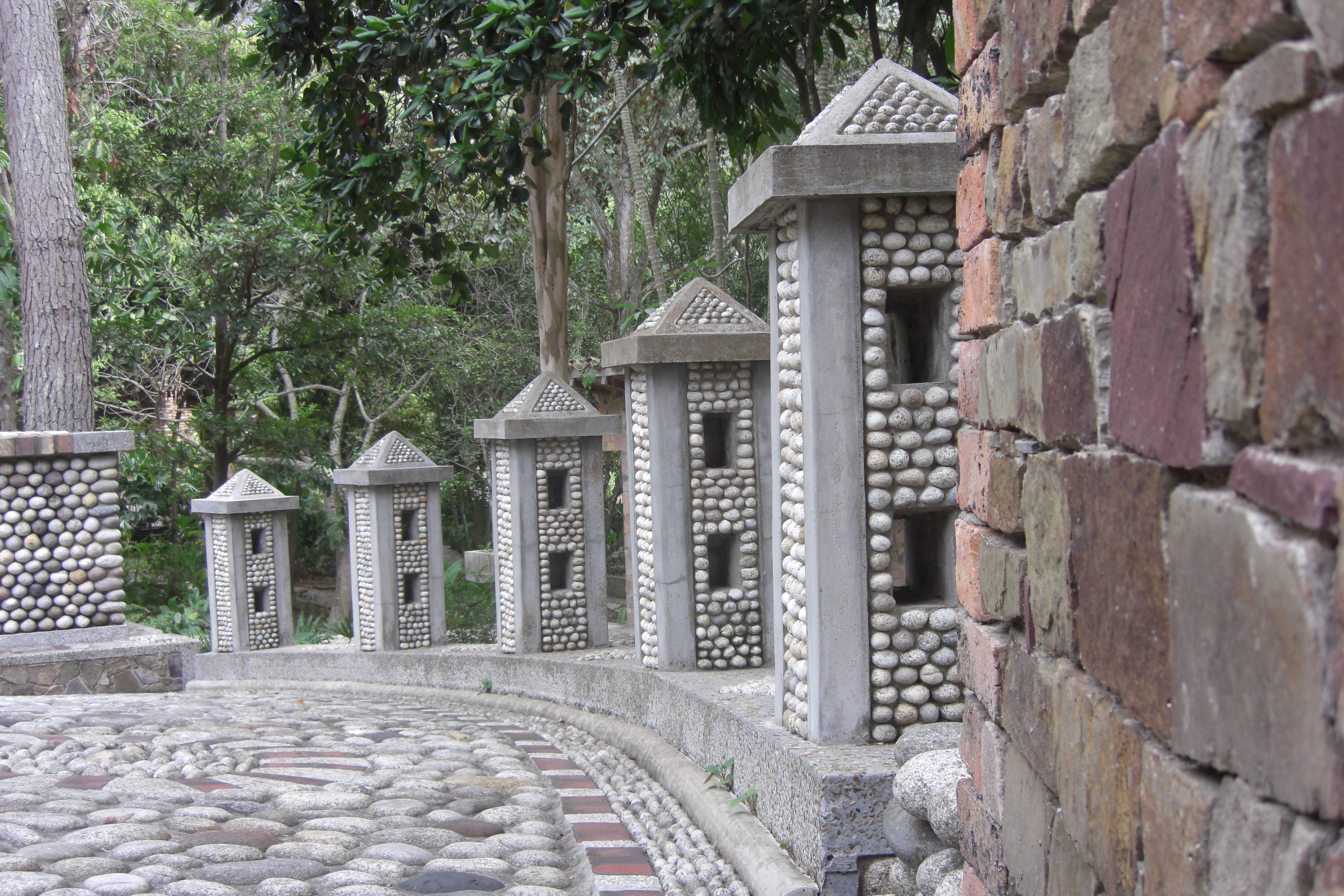
- Castle in Colón.

- Flag Coat of arms
- Nickname: "La Ciudad de Las Palmeras" (English: "The Palm City")
- Interactive map of San Juan de Colón
- Country: Venezuela
- State: Táchira
- Municipality: Ayacucho

Government
  - Mayor: Gabino Paz Guerrero (COPEI)

Area
  - Total: 484 km^{2} (187 sq mi)
- Elevation: 850 m (2,790 ft)

Population (2013)
  - Total: 36,925
  - Density: 76.3/km^{2} (198/sq mi)
- Time zone: UTC−4 (VET)
- Area code: 0277
- Climate: Am
- Website: ayacucho-tachira.gob.ve
- The area and population figures are for the municipality

Colón is a town in the Venezuelan Andean state of Táchira. This town is the shire town of the Ayacucho Municipality and, according to the 2001 Venezuelan census, the municipality has a population of 48,982.

== Climate ==
Colón has a tropical rainforest climate (Köppen: Af) with consistently warm temperatures throughout the year. The average high temperature for the year is 26.1 °C (79.0 °F), and the average low temperature is 20.2 °C (68.4 °F). Colón experiences significant rainfall throughout the year, with a peak in October and November, amounting to a yearly average of 1485.9 millimeters (58.50 inches).

Climate data for Colón (1991–2020)
Month	Jan	Feb	Mar	Apr	May	Jun	Jul	Aug	Sep	Oct	Nov	Dec	Year
Record high °C (°F)	33.6 (92.5)	32.5 (90.5)	36.5 (97.7)	33.1 (91.6)	33.6 (92.5)	33.6 (92.5)	35.0 (95.0)	37.1 (98.8)	34.4 (93.9)	34.6 (94.3)	34.4 (93.9)	31.5 (88.7)	37.1 (98.8)
Mean daily maximum °C (°F)	25.3 (77.5)	25.3 (77.5)	25.5 (77.9)	26.0 (78.8)	26.5 (79.7)	26.7 (80.1)	26.6 (79.9)	27.2 (81.0)	27.2 (81.0)	26.2 (79.2)	25.4 (77.7)	25.1 (77.2)	26.1 (79.0)
Daily mean °C (°F)	22.1 (71.8)	22.3 (72.1)	22.8 (73.0)	23.1 (73.6)	23.4 (74.1)	23.3 (73.9)	23.2 (73.8)	23.6 (74.5)	23.4 (74.1)	23.0 (73.4)	22.5 (72.5)	22.2 (72.0)	22.9 (73.2)
Mean daily minimum °C (°F)	19.2 (66.6)	19.4 (66.9)	19.8 (67.6)	20.5 (68.9)	20.7 (69.3)	20.7 (69.3)	20.5 (68.9)	20.7 (69.3)	20.5 (68.9)	20.3 (68.5)	20.0 (68.0)	19.7 (67.5)	20.2 (68.4)
Record low °C (°F)	15.2 (59.4)	14.4 (57.9)	15.8 (60.4)	14.9 (58.8)	14.9 (58.8)	15.7 (60.3)	15.7 (60.3)	12.0 (53.6)	13.8 (56.8)	11.3 (52.3)	13.2 (55.8)	15.6 (60.1)	11.3 (52.3)
Average precipitation mm (inches)	94.9 (3.74)	81.3 (3.20)	119.5 (4.70)	165.4 (6.51)	122.6 (4.83)	86.6 (3.41)	84.9 (3.34)	86.0 (3.39)	118.6 (4.67)	188.2 (7.41)	203.9 (8.03)	134.0 (5.28)	1,485.9 (58.50)
Average precipitation days (≥ 1.0 mm)	6.7	7.5	10.1	13.1	12.3	10.8	10.7	10.4	11.8	14.8	14.0	9.8	132.0
Source: NOAA

== Demographics ==
The Ayacucho Municipality, according to the 2001 Venezuelan census, has a population of 48,982 (up from 41,404 in 1990). This amounts to 4.9% of Táchira's population. The municipality's population density is 262.1 people per square mile (101.20/km^{2}).

== Government ==
Colón is the shire town of the Ayacucho Municipality in Táchira. The mayor of the Ayacucho Municipality is Gabino Paz Guerrero, reelected in 2004 with 47% of the vote. The last municipal election was held in October 2004.

== Sites of interest ==
=== Religious buildings ===
- Iglesia San Juan Bautista

=== Squares and parks ===
- Plaza Bolívar
- Plaza Sucre de Colón

== Notable people ==
- Ramón José Velásquez Former Interim President of Venezuela
- Pedro Antonio Ríos Reyna, Venezuelan classical musician.
