= Ayacucho Municipality, Táchira =

Ayacucho Municipality Municipio Ayacucho
- Municipality
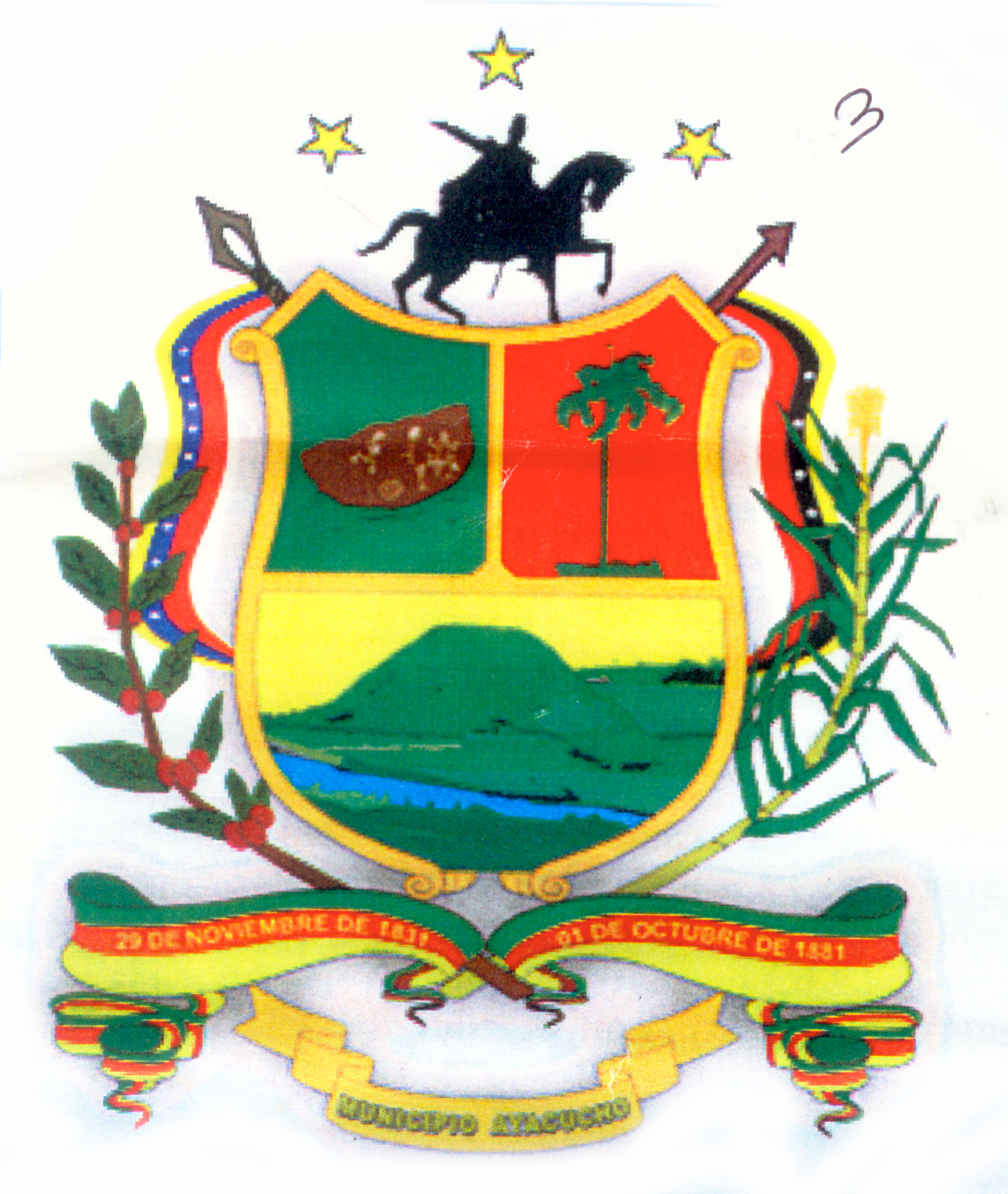
- Flag Coat of arms

- Location in Táchira

- Location in Venezuela
- Coordinates: 8°05′56″N 72°16′57″W
- Country: Venezuela
- State: Táchira
- Municipal seat: San Juan de Colón

Government
  - Mayor: Yoira Vargas De Meza (PSUV)

Area
  - Total: 507 km^{2} (196 sq mi)

Population (2011 -> 2019 projection)
  - Total: 58,697 -> 62,156
  - Density: 116/km^{2} (300/sq mi)
- Time zone: UTC−4 (VET)
- Area code(s): 0277

The Ayacucho Municipality is one of the 29 municipalities that makes up the western Venezuelan state of Táchira and, according to the 2011 Venezuelean census, the municipality had a population of 58,697. The mayor of the municipality is Yoira Vargas De Meza of the PSUV party since June 2025 and the town of Colón is the municipal seat of the Ayacucho Municipality.

== Demographics ==
Based on the 2011 Venezuelan census, The population of the Ayacucho Municipality was 58,697 people, accounting for 4.9% of the total population of the state of Táchira. The majority (81.21%) of the municipality's population is in the town of Colón, the municipal seat.

By June 2019, official projections from the Venezuelan Statistics National Institute estimated the population of Ayacucho as 62,156 people, representing an annual growth rate of 0.72% since 2011 and showing a population density of 122.6 inhabitants/km². However, these projections do not account for the impact of emigration linked to the country's recent economic and political circumstances.

The gender distribution of the population was 49.7% men (29,514) and 50.3% women (29,821). The age distribution showed that the largest segment of the population was aged 15 to 64, comprising 66.9% of the people. Younger people aged 0 to 14 made up 25.5% of the population, while those aged 65 and older accounted for 7.6%. The municipality is mostly urbanized, with 85.5% of inhabitants (50,760) living in urban centers compared to just 14.5% (8,575) in rural areas.

Ethnically, the municipality identified as predominantly White people (59.1%) and Mestizo (39%). Minority groups included 0.6% Afro-Venezuelans, a small indigenous population of 26 individuals, and 1.2% belonging to other ethnic groups. The literacy rate was 93.8%, with 3,068 inhabitants of Ayacucho not able to read or write.

== Government ==
The mayor of the Ayacucho Municipality is Yoira Vargas De Meza of the PSUV party. She was elected in June 2025. The previous mayor, Yonnhy Liscano Quintero of the Democratic Alliance party, was arrested in June 2024. The municipality is divided into three parishes; Ayacucho, Rivas Berti, San Pedro del Río.
