= Christian McGaffney =

Venezuelan actor (born 1989)

- Born: April 8, 1988 (age 38); Caracas, Venezuela
- Occupation: Actor
- Years active: 2005-present
- Spouse: María Gabriela de Faría (m. 2020)

Christian McGaffney (born April 8, 1989) is a Venezuelan actor. He is best known for his role in the film Simón.

McGaffney plays a comedic role as Joey in The Duel. He also plays Juan Planchard in the theatrical adaptation of Las Aventuras de Juan Planchard.

McGaffney began his career as a teenager in Venezuelan telenovelas. His early stage work includes the play Gross Indecency: The Three Trials of Oscar Wilde and HIGH.

In January 2020, McGaffney married Venezuelan actress and singer María Gabriela de Faría.
