= Blipvert =

Television advertising lasting one second

A blipvert is a very brief television advertisement, lasting one second. The word is a portmanteau of blip, a brief sound, and advertisement.

The term and concept were used in the 1985 film Max Headroom: 20 Minutes into the Future and in Blipverts, the first episode of the 1987 science fiction television show Max Headroom. In the film and TV show, "blipverts" were new high-speed, concentrated, high-intensity television commercials lasting about three seconds. Their purpose was to prevent the channel-switching that may occur during standard-length commercials, but they had the side-effect of making some viewers explode. They were invented as a MacGuffin to drive the plot.

== Real-life examples of compressed advertising ==
Real life advertisements have been cited as benefiting from a "blipvert effect", in which viewers recall the advertisements better.

Master Lock, which had already made the image of a padlock shot by a sharpshooter into a lasting advertising image with their ad in the Super Bowl in 1974, incorporated that video image, along with its logo, in a one-second-long television commercial in 1998. Advertising Age, in describing why the concept did not catch on, said that is "difficult to do much with a one-second ad".

In 2002, MuchMusic introduced promos that consisted of one of twelve images of a VJ posing in front of the network's logo, lasting for only 1/60th of a second each. The "quickies" were recognized with a Guinness World Record for the world's shortest television commercial.

In May 2006, GE introduced "One Second Theater", television commercials with additional material included as individual frames in the last second of the ad, for frame-by-frame viewing with digital video recorders. When viewed at normal speed, the frames flash by rapidly, much like blipverts.

Miller Brewing Company aired a one-second ad during the Super Bowl XLIII football game in February 2009. The ad featured Windell Middlebrooks, who had been featured in Miller High Life ads since 2006, standing in a warehouse filled with High Life boxes and quickly shouting "High Life!"
