= Max Headroom: 20 Minutes into the Future =

1985 cyberpunk television movie

- Genre: Science fiction
- Screenplay by: Steve Roberts
- Story by: George Stone; Rocky Morton; Annabel Jankel
- Directed by: Rocky Morton; Annabel Jankel
- Starring: Matt Frewer; Nickolas Grace; Amanda Pays; W. Morgan Sheppard; Roger Sloman; Hilary Tindall
- Music by: Midge Ure; Chris Cross
- Country of origin: United Kingdom
- Original language: English

Production
- Executive producer: Terry Ellis
- Producer: Peter Wagg
- Production locations: East Ham, London, England
- Cinematography: Phil Méheux
- Editor: Michael Bradsell
- Running time: 57 minutes
- Production company: Chrysalis Visual Programming Ltd.

Original release
- Network: Channel 4
- Release: 4 April 1985

Max Headroom: 20 Minutes into the Future is a 1985 British cyberpunk television film produced by Chrysalis Visual Programming Ltd. for Channel 4. Max Headroom was created by George Stone, Annabel Jankel, and Rocky Morton, while the TV movie story was developed by Stone and screenwriter Steve Roberts. The television film was created to provide a backstory and origin for the character Max before he started appearing regularly as host and veejay of a new music video programme on Channel 4, The Max Headroom Show.

The story depicts a near-future where corrupt corporations control much of the world and manipulate the public for the sake of ratings and wealth. Events lead crusading journalist Edison Carter to crash a motorcycle and suffer head trauma from a parking lot safety sign reading "MAX. HEADROOM: 2.3 M" (an overhead clearance of 2.3 metres). While unconscious, Carter's mind and memories are used as the basis for a new artificial intelligence that adopts the name Max Headroom. While Carter recovers and exposes corporate corruption, his AI twin Max becomes popular as a witty TV host who criticizes society and media. Both Edison Carter and Max Headroom are portrayed by actor Matt Frewer.

On 4 April 1985, Channel 4 transmitted the TV movie Max Headroom: 20 Minutes Into the Future, starring Matt Frewer, Amanda Pays, Paul Spurrier, Nickolas Grace, and W. Morgan Sheppard. Two days later, Max began appearing regularly as the veejay of The Max Headroom Show. HBO (which owned another cable television provider Cinemax) provided some of the original funding and the series later ran on Cinemax for American audiences. Following its cancellation, American network ABC commissioned Chrysalis to produce a new dramatic television series based on the characters, concepts, and world established in the film Max Headroom: 20 Minutes into the Future. The new programme, entitled simply Max Headroom, featured Matt Frewer, Amanda Pays and W. Morgan Sheppard reprising their original roles. Each episode began with the phrase "20 Minutes into the Future."

== Plot ==
Edison Carter is a headstrong television reporter determined to uncover corruption even if his employer Network 23 is involved. Carter is investigating an apartment explosion when he is pulled from the story by the television station management. Carter's new producer Theora Jones agrees to help him investigate further despite pressure from upper management. The two discover Network 23 is covering up the fact that its new subliminal advertising called "blipverts" can be fatal to certain viewers, even causing them to explode.

Carter recovers evidence of the cover-up at Network 23 headquarters but is discovered on security camera by Bryce Lynch, an amoral teenage computer genius who created blipverts and answers only to Network 23's chief executive Mr. Grossman. As Carter attempts to flee from Mr Breugal and Mr Mahler, two sociopathic thugs-for-hire, via the building's parking garage on a motorcycle, Lynch takes control of the security barriers. The rising barrier causes Carter to crash through a low-clearance sign labelled "Max. Headroom 2.3m", resulting in a serious head injury. Jones witnesses Carter's crash via security cameras but is unable to arrive in time before Lynch's hired goons remove him from the scene.

Grossman is upset Lynch has attacked and possibly killed Carter, as the journalist's fame means his disappearance will be noticed and investigated. To delay any investigation and provide alibis, Lynch insists he can digitally copy Carter's mind and appearance. This way they can create a digital replacement and fake footage of the reporter being alive and well for days to come. But his efforts are flawed. The digital clone does not look identical to Carter and seems to develop its own personality after repeatedly saying "max headroom." Giving up on the plan, Bryce instructs Breugal and Mahler to dispose of both Carter and the "Max Headroom" digital personality. Instead, they decide to profit by selling Max Headroom to Blank Reg, the presenter of "Big Time", a pirate television station, and Carter to a "body bank" where he will be harvested for organs.

After some guidance from Reg, Max Headroom quickly becomes a popular TV host on Blank Reg’s pirate station, delivering biting commentary and rapid-fire humour, particularly about Network 23, which gets the uneasy attention of a now panicked Grossman. Meanwhile, recovering from his injuries, Carter escapes the body bank and reunites with Jones. With her help, and the help of Breugal and Mahler, Carter eventually reveals he is still alive and exposes the corruption of Network 23, Lynch and Grossman. Max Headroom remains with Big Time.

== Cast ==
- Matt Frewer as Edison Carter / Max Headroom
- Nickolas Grace as Grossman
- Amanda Pays as Theora Jones
- W. Morgan Sheppard as Blank Reg
- Roger Sloman as Murray
- Hilary Tindall as Dominique
- Paul Spurrier as Bryce Lynch
- Hilton McRae as Breugal
- George Rossi as Mahler

== Conception and development ==
The character of Max Headroom and his nature as a computer-generated person was created by George Stone, Annabel Jankel, and Rocky Morton. With the rising popularity of music videos with youth culture and stations such as MTV, Channel 4 decided to host its own music video programme. Rocky Morton was tasked to come up with a graphic that would play before and after the videos, make it clear to audiences these were features of a special show and not just music videos airing at random between TV commercials. Taking inspiration from MTV video jockeys (VJs or "veejays") and US TV hosts, Rocky Morton decided a graphic or "bumper video" would not appeal to youth nearly as much as a host with a loud personality. He also thought British youth would be suspicious of a youthful personality attempting to appeal to them and might instead appreciate the cynical irony of a host who appeared to be a conservative man in a simple suit and tie attempting to appeal to youth but not having a true understanding of their culture. He saw the host as "the most boring thing that I could think of to do... a talking head: a middle-class white male in a suit, talking to them in a really boring way about music videos."

Morton thought the host should be computer-generated or animated. When this did not prove practical, it was decided to cast an actor who would present the illusion of a computer generated host. The character's name originated well before the other aspects of the character because the phrase "max. headroom" was often displayed over the entranceway of car parks and garages in the UK. George Stone remarked this gave the character "Instant branding, instant recognition." The creators also appreciated that "Max Headroom" was comically ironic since the character acted as if he knew and understood everything, while the name indicated his mind was actually empty of true knowledge and wisdom. Sometime after the popularity of Max Headroom as a character, it became more common in the UK for such signs to read "max. height" rather than "max. headroom."

Channel 4 executives enjoyed the idea Morton pitched and decided to first introduce Max as a character in an hour-long TV-movie before then presenting him as a programme host in The Max Headroom Show. Producer Peter Wagg hired writers David Hansen and Paul Owen to construct Max Headroom's "whole persona", which Morton described as the "very sterile, arrogant, Western personification of the middle-class, male TV host". The background story provided for the Max Headroom character was rooted in a dystopian near-future dominated by television and large corporations, devised by George Stone and eventual script writer Steve Roberts.

Canadian-American actor Matt Frewer tested for the role after a friend of his had already auditioned and then suggested him instead. Producer and Max Headroom co-creator Annabel Jankel thought Frewer would be a good choice to masquerade as a person whose appearance was designed by a computer, seeing from his casting polaroid photo that he had "unbelievably well-defined features." Frewer was given "a few lines" of dialogue and then encouraged to improvise as he saw fit. Frewer did a comedic improvisation that lasted for more than ten minutes, impressing the production crew. The actor took inspiration from character Ted Baxter of The Mary Tyler Moore Show, saying in a 1987 interview, "I particularly wanted to get that phony bonhomie of Baxter ... Max always assumes a decade long friendship on the first meeting. At first sight, he'll ask about that blackhead on your nose."

Matt Frewer on set, being shot as Max Headroom.

The character of Max Headroom was advertised as the first "computer-generated" television presenter. The illusion of a computer-generated character who only exists in computers and TV broadcast signals was accomplished by having Matt Frewer wear prosthetic make-up, contact lenses, and a plastic molded suit while sitting in front of a blue screen. Harsh lighting and other editing and recording effects heightened the illusion of a CGI character. Rod Lord and Peter Tupey won the award for best graphics at the 1986 BAFTA Television Craft Awards.

In discussing Max's fictional origin story, it was first proposed that he could be an AI created to stand-in for a human TV host who was late for his own show. The backstory would be revealed through different five-minute segments during the first season of The Max Headroom Show. When Channel 4 decided Max's origin would be featured in an hour long TV movie instead, an expanded story was developed and the origin was altered to now involve a crusading journalist named Edison Carter. On 4 April 1985, the TV movie Max Headroom: 20 Minutes Into the Future introduced Max to television audiences. On 6 April 1985, Channel 4 aired the first episode of The Max Headroom Show.

== Production ==
Exterior locations include the Beckton Gas Works.

== Spin-off ==
In 1987, American network ABC hired the creators of the Channel 4 film to adapt the story and world of Max Headroom: 20 Minutes into the Future into the dramatic series Max Headroom. Fourteen episodes were made and all but one were broadcast during the 1987–1988 television season. The pilot was a remake of the Channel 4 movie with minor changes, such as having Max and Carter actually acquainted, and making Max work with Network 23 rather than Big Time. The pilot recycled some of the digital footage from the original film. Cast members Matt Frewer, Amanda Pays and William Morgan Sheppard reprised their roles from the original film. Jeffrey Tambor was added to the cast as Edison's boss Murray. Pablo Cruise keyboardist Cory Lerios provided the theme. Each episode of the dramatic series began with the phrase "20 Minutes into the Future."

== Home media release ==
Max Headroom: 20 Minutes into the Future was released on VHS in the US and UK in 1986. In 2006, it was released on DVD in Japan.
