= Chuck Swirsky =

American-Canadian radio sports announcer

- Swirsky calling a Chicago Bulls game at the United Center in 2009.
- Born: January 30, 1954 (age 72); Norfolk, Virginia, U.S.
- Education: Ohio University- Interlake High School.
- Occupation: Radio sports announcer
- Employer: Chicago Bulls

Chuck Swirsky (born January 30, 1954) is an American–Canadian radio sports announcer. He is the play-by-play voice of the Chicago Bulls of the National Basketball Association (NBA). Swirsky's association with Chicago sports started in 1979 with his WCFL AM 1000 talk show, which debuted on August 27 of that year. Outside Chicago, Swirsky called play-by-play for both University of Michigan basketball and football and was formerly the play-by-play voice of the Toronto Raptors.

Born in Norfolk, Virginia, Swirsky grew up in Bellevue, Washington, and is a graduate of Interlake High School.

== Broadcasting and career ==
Swirsky began his broadcasting career on Cleveland radio with WWWE-AM. Starting in 1979, Swirsky hosted a nightly sports radio show on WCFL (AM 1000) where he talked Chicago sports with callers. Swirsky then moved to WLUP (The Loop), where he provided afternoon sports updates and hosted a Sunday sports radio show from 9 to 11 pm through 1981. In 1980 Swirsky was named the Chicago Bulls public address announcer, serving until 1983. Swirsky next joined WGN radio in 1981 and remained through the mid-1990s. Swirsky hosted various sports talk shows and provided sports updates. While he was with WGN, he also did play-by-play for DePaul games alongside former coach Ray Meyer and also did Chicago Bears pre-game and post-game coverage. He also made frequent appearances on the Bob Collins radio show discussing Chicago sports, with Collins dubbing him "The Swirsk". During Swirsky's time at WGN, a man dressed as Max Headroom who hijacked a broadcast of Doctor Who made a mocking reference to Swirsky, calling him a "frickin' liberal". Bruce Wolf frequently parodied Swirsky with a fictional character, "Chet Chitchat", a blended caricature of Chicago sportscasters Chet Coppock and Swirsky. During his time at WGN Radio, Swirsky filled in as a sports anchor occasionally at WGN-TV. A former evangelical Christian, Swirsky in the early 1990s began hosting the hour-long radio talk show Sports Spectrum, produced by Radio Bible Class (now RBC Ministries). Swirsky has since returned to his childhood faith of Catholicism.

Swirsky left WGN for Detroit, where he did play-by-play for University of Michigan basketball in the mid-1990s. He was also sports director for WJR radio. Rob Pelinka was among his Michigan color commentators.

Swirsky next moved to Toronto to become the play-by-play voice of the Toronto Raptors during the 1998–99 NBA season, first on the radio, then for television beginning in 2001. On March 23, 2007, Swirsky was honored by the Raptors when they gave out 18,000 bobbleheads with his likeness. He was known for his famous "Salami & Cheese" phrase, which was used to advertise Raptors game packs during the 2007–08 season. Another catch phrase was "Onions, Baby, Onions," uttered when a player made a three-point shot, and later used to advertise Raptors NBA TV HD. Swirsky became a Canadian citizen on January 14, 2008.

During the middle of his tenure in Toronto, Swirsky also hosted a sports radio show on CJCL (The Fan 590) called The Chuck Swirsky Show. Swirsky took listeners' calls and provided sports news. On May 6, 2008, Swirsky left the organization for personal reasons related to his family. The show ended on July 31, 2008, and Swirsky's vacated position was filled by Matt Devlin.

Swirsky has since returned to Chicago to carry out the radio play-by-play for the Chicago Bulls on its flagship station WMVP, which is the same station as Swirsky's first employer, WCFL. He has also called Chicago White Sox games in 2015 as a fill-in for then play-by-play broadcaster, Ken "Hawk" Harrelson.

On September 7, 2016, Swirsky was inducted into the Chicagoland Sports Hall of Fame. In May 2018, he was inducted into the Illinois Basketball Coaches Association Hall of Fame and the WGN Radio Walk of Fame. He was named to the National Bobblehead Hall of Fame in 2022.
