= Annabel Jankel =

British film director (born 1955)

- Born: 1 June 1955 (age 71); London, England
- Education: Surrey Institute of Art & Design, University College
- Occupation: Film director
- Years active: 1978–present
- Spouse: Rocky Morton (div. 2005)

Annabel Jankel (born 1 June 1955), also known as AJ Jankel, is a British film and TV director who first came to prominence as a music video director and the co-creator of the pioneering cyber-character Max Headroom and as co-director of the film adaptation of Super Mario Bros. She is the sister of musician and songwriter Chaz Jankel, who is best known as a member of new wave band Ian Dury & The Blockheads, as well as the aunt of DJ and record producer Lewis Jankel, better known by his stage name Shift K3Y.

== Early career ==
She started her career in the late 1970s at the UK-based film production company Cucumber Studios which she founded with her partner - fellow director Rocky Morton. Jankel and Morton specialized in creating music videos, TV commercials and TV title sequences using a combination of live action, animation and the then emerging art of computer graphics. In this period the duo directed several music videos for performers including Rush ("The Enemy Within"), Elvis Costello ("Accidents Will Happen"), Talking Heads ("Blind"), Tom Tom Club ("Genius of Love", "Pleasure of Love", "Don't Say No"), Donald Fagen ("New Frontier") and Miles Davis ("Decoy").

In 1985, Jankel and Morton won an Emmy Award for their title sequence for the NBC show Friday Night Videos. And that same year their innovative TV commercial for the newly launched soft drink Quatro gained recognition at the British Television Advertising Awards.

In 2003, their 1978 music video for Elvis Costello's "Accidents Will Happen" was one of only 35 videos selected for inclusion in the Museum of Modern Art's prestigious "Golden Oldies of Music Video" exhibition. Their music videos are found in the permanent collections of the Museum of Modern Art in New York City and at the Victoria & Albert Museum in London.

In 1984, Jankel and Morton co-authored a book titled Creative Computer Graphics that detailed the history of the craft and essayed its future.

== Breakthrough ==
Jankel co-created Max Headroom, a cult cyberpunk character that evolved into multiple TV productions and became very influential in science fiction TV and impacted popular culture in the 1980s. Jankel and Morton first created and directed The Max Talking Headroom Show - an entertainment program that featured comedic sequences, interviews conducted by the Headroom cyber-character and music videos. (Channel 4 - UK and HBO - US). This led to the TV film Max Headroom: 20 Minutes into the Future, also directed by the duo. The TV film in turn inspired the ABC Max Headroom US TV series.

Subsequent to the success of Max Headroom, Jankel and Morton moved to Los Angeles. They were considered to co-direct the 1988 horror film Child's Play, the first film to feature the character of Chucky, before Tom Holland was hired. Together they worked on D.O.A, a remake of the 1949 film of the same name, starring Meg Ryan and Dennis Quaid. The film received critical acclaim in The Washington Post'' and from film writers such as Roger Ebert who described it as "a witty and literate thriller".

Following D.O.A., Jankel and Morton directed the film Super Mario Bros., loosely based on the video game of the same name, starring Bob Hoskins, John Leguizamo and Dennis Hopper. The film was set in a dark post-apocalyptic interpretation of the Mushroom Kingdom, as distinct from the colorful cartoonish setting of the game. It was panned by critics, receiving almost universally negative reviews. As of April 2023, review aggregator Rotten Tomatoes reports that 29% of critics gave positive reviews based on 43 reviews. The site's consensus states: "Despite flashy sets and special effects, Super Mario Bros. is too light on story and substance to be anything more than a novelty." Gene Siskel of the Chicago Tribune and Roger Ebert of the Chicago Sun-Times gave the film two thumbs down on the television program Siskel & Ebert at the Movies, and the film was on their list for one of the worst films of 1993. Michael Wilmington of the Los Angeles Times disapproved of the film's script. However, Hal Hinson of The Washington Post gave a positive review, praising the film for its spirit and later went on to say, "In short, it's a blast."

== Solo career ==
Jankel became a director of television commercials for clients, such as Sealy, Coca-Cola, Bud Light, AOL, Bacardi, Hallmark and Greenpeace. She was awarded the Gold Award for "Best TV Commercial Campaign" at the Worldfest REMI Awards.

In 2006, Jankel directed the 24-episode TV series Live from Abbey Road seen on Channel 4 in the UK and on the Sundance Channel in the US. - working with over 72 major musical artists including Paul Simon, Red Hot Chili Peppers, Dave Matthews, Norah Jones, Wynton Marsalis, John Mayer and Dr. John.

Jankel directed the 2009 film adaptation of David Almond's novel Skellig, a $5.3M Sky1 HD Easter Special feature-length production for television broadcast and subsequent international theatrical distribution. The film stars Tim Roth in the title role.

In 2011, Jankel directed the 52-minute 3D show "Live on Air" shown on Sky3D Atlantic and Sky Arts, featuring the band Elbow, in rehearsal and performing at the 02 centre.

In 2018, Jankel directed the lesbian film Tell It to the Bees.

== See also ==
- List of female film and television directors
