= Max Headroom signal hijackings =

1987 Chicago television hijacking incident

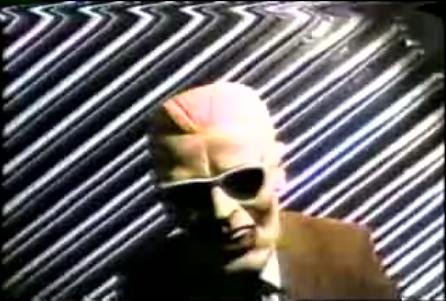
- The unknown person dressed to resemble Max Headroom in the pirate broadcast
- Date: November 22, 1987; 38 years ago
- Location: Chicago, Illinois, U.S.
- Target: WGN-TV; WTTW
- Participants: At least 2 (all unknown)

On November 22, 1987, two television stations based in Chicago, Illinois, were hijacked two hours apart from one another by unidentified perpetrators. Both hijackings briefly sent pirate broadcasts of an unidentified person wearing a Max Headroom mask and costume to thousands of homes in the Chicago metropolitan area.

The first hijacking took place on the independent TV station WGN-TV's nightly newscast. An unidentified person wearing a Max Headroom mask swayed erratically in front of a semi-swiveling metal panel, likely meant to resemble the background often featured in the Max Headroom series. The perpetrators were unable to broadcast any audio; the only sound viewers heard was a loud buzz. The interruption went on for nearly 17 seconds before engineers at WGN-TV were able to regain control of their broadcast tower.

The second hijacking occurred about two hours later, during PBS member station WTTW's broadcast of the Doctor Who serial Horror of Fang Rock. With nobody on duty at the tower that was hijacked, the perpetrators were able to broadcast audio and stay on the air longer than they did during the first hijacking. As with the first incident a person wearing a Max Headroom mask made reference to Max Headroom advertisements and other seemingly unrelated topics, before concluding by presenting their bare buttocks to a woman with a flyswatter. At that point, the hijackers ended the pirate broadcast, and normal programming resumed after an interruption of about 90 seconds.

A criminal investigation conducted by the Federal Communications Commission (FCC) in the immediate aftermath of the intrusion could not find the people responsible for the hijacking. Despite many unofficial inquiries and speculation since the hijackings, the perpetrators have yet to be identified.

== Signal hijackings ==
Both signal hijackings took place on local TV stations based in Chicago, Illinois, on the night of Sunday, November 22, 1987.

=== WGN-TV ===
A recording of the WGN-TV intrusion

The first intrusion took place at 9:14 p.m. during the sports segment of WGN-TV's The Nine O'Clock News. Home viewers' screens went black for about 15 seconds before the image of a person wearing a Max Headroom mask and sunglasses appeared. The individual rocked erratically in front of a semi-rotating corrugated metal panel that mimicked the real Max Headroom's geometric background effect, accompanied by a static, garbled buzzing sound. The entire intrusion lasted for about 30 seconds and was cut off when engineers at WGN changed the frequency of the signal linking the broadcast studio to the station's transmitter atop the John Hancock Center.

Upon returning to the airwaves, WGN sports anchor Dan Roan commented, "Well, if you're wondering what's happened, so am I", and joked that the computer running the news "took off and went wild". Roan then proceeded to restart his report of the day's Chicago Bears game, which had been interrupted by the intrusion.

=== WTTW ===
A recording of the WTTW intrusion

That same night, at about 11:20 p.m., the signal of local PBS station WTTW was interrupted during an airing of the first part of the Doctor Who serial Horror of Fang Rock. The culprit was apparently the same Max Headroom impersonator, this time audible through distorted audio.

The masked figure spent the next minute or so making a quick series of brief and seemingly unrelated comments and cultural references interspersed with excited noises and exclamations. He was first heard to make a comment about "nerds", then called WGN sportscaster Chuck Swirsky a "frickin' liberal", held up a can of Pepsi while referencing the "Catch the wave" slogan from a recent ad campaign for Coca-Cola featuring the real Max Headroom, and held up a middle finger near the camera inside what appeared to be a hollowed-out dildo. After some random moaning, the masked figure sang the phrase "Your love is fading"; hummed part of the theme song to the 1959 animated series Clutch Cargo, and said, "I still see the X!" (a reference to the last episode of that show, which is sometimes misheard as "I stole CBS.") He also feigned defecation (complaining of his piles), claiming that he had "made a giant masterpiece for all the Greatest World Newspaper nerds" (WGN's call letters stand for "World's Greatest Newspaper"), and put a knitted glove on one hand while commenting that it was dirty and his brother "had the other one". After a crude jump cut, the main figure appeared mostly offscreen to the left with his partially exposed buttocks visible from the side, with a female figure wearing a French maid costume and what appears to be a mask appearing on the right edge of the frame. The (unworn) Max Headroom mask was briefly held in view while the voice cried out, "Oh no, they're coming to get me! Ah, make it stop!" and the female figure began spanking "Max" with a flyswatter. The image faded briefly into static, and then viewers were returned to the Doctor Who broadcast after a total interruption of about 90 seconds.

Technicians at WTTW's studios could not counteract the signal takeover because there were no engineers on duty at that hour at the Sears Tower, where the station's broadcast tower was located. According to station spokesman Anders Yocom, technicians monitoring the transmission from WTTW headquarters "attempted to take corrective measures, but couldn't". Air director Paul Rizzo recalled that "as the content got weirder, we got increasingly stressed out about our inability to do anything about it". The pirate broadcast ended when the hijackers unilaterally ended their transmission. "By the time our people began looking into what was going on, it was over," said Yocom. WTTW received numerous phone calls from viewers who wondered what had occurred.

== Methods ==
The broadcast intrusion was achieved by sending a more powerful microwave transmission to the stations' broadcast towers than the stations were sending themselves, triggering a capture effect. Experts have said that the stunt required extensive technical expertise and a significant amount of transmitting power, and that the pirate broadcast likely originated from somewhere in the line of sight of both stations' broadcast towers, which were atop two tall buildings in downtown Chicago. While the prank was difficult to accomplish in 1987, it became almost impossible to replicate after American television stations switched from analog to digital signals in 2009.

== Investigations ==
No one has ever claimed responsibility for the stunt. Speculation about the identities of "Max" and his co-conspirators has centered on the theories that the prank was either an inside job by a disgruntled employee (or former employee) of WGN or was carried out by members of Chicago's underground hacker community. However, despite an official law enforcement investigation in the immediate aftermath of the incident and many unofficial investigations, inquiries, and online speculation in the ensuing decades, the identities and motives of the hijackers remain a mystery.

Soon after the intrusion, an FCC official was quoted in news reporting that the perpetrators faced a maximum fine of $100,000 and up to a year in prison. However, the five-year statute of limitations expired in 1992, and the people responsible for the intrusion would no longer face criminal punishment should their identities be revealed.

== Cultural impact ==
Though the incident only briefly caught the attention of the general public, it has been overtly or subtly referenced in a variety of media over the ensuing decades, with Motherboard claiming that it has been an influential "cyberpunk hacking trope".

The first reference came soon after the initial events when WMAQ-TV, another Chicago TV station, humorously inserted clips of the hijacking into a newscast during Mark Giangreco's sports highlights. "A lot of people thought it was real – the pirate cutting into our broadcast. We got all kinds of calls about it," said Giangreco.

In "Freakshow", a season 3 episode of Space Ghost Coast to Coast, a broadcast intruder who goes by the name of Commander Andy (played by Andy Merrill), constantly interrupts the feed while Space Ghost (voiced by George Lowe) tries to conduct his interview. The episode itself pokes fun of pirate hijackings on television, and while Moltar (voiced by C. Martin Croker) is trying to cancel the intrusion to get the show back to normal, a brief clip of the Max Headroom Incident is shown on his monitor.

== See also ==
- Captain Midnight broadcast signal intrusion
- Pirate television
- Southern Television broadcast interruption
