= Max Headroom (TV series) =

1987–1988 satirical science fiction show

- Genre: Science fiction; Cyberpunk; Dark comedy; Drama; Satire
- Created by: George Stone; Rocky Morton; Annabel Jankel
- Starring: Matt Frewer; Amanda Pays; Jeffrey Tambor; Chris Young; George Coe; W. Morgan Sheppard; Charles Rocket
- Theme music composer: Michael Hoenig
- Country of origin: United States
- Original language: English
- No. of seasons: 2
- No. of episodes: 14 (1 unaired)

Production
- Executive producer: Peter Wagg
- Producers: Brian E. Frankish; Peter Wagg
- Camera setup: Single-camera
- Running time: 45–48 minutes
- Production companies: Chrysalis/Lakeside; Lorimar-Telepictures

Original release
- Network: ABC
- Release: March 31, 1987 – May 5, 1988

Related
- Max Headroom: 20 Minutes into the Future

Max Headroom is an American satirical cyberpunk science fiction television series by Chrysalis Visual Programming and Lakeside Productions for Lorimar-Telepictures that aired in the United States on ABC from March 31, 1987, to May 5, 1988. The series is set in a futuristic dystopia ruled by an oligarchy of television networks, and features the character and media personality Max Headroom. The story is based on the Channel 4 British TV film produced by Chrysalis, Max Headroom: 20 Minutes into the Future.

T-L to B-R: Max Headroom (in background), Bryce Lynch, Edison Carter, Theora Jones, Murray McKenzie and Ben Cheviot.

== Premise ==
In the future, an oligarchy of television networks rules the world. Even the government functions primarily as a puppet of the network executives, serving mainly to pass laws—such as banning "off" switches on televisions—that protect and consolidate the networks' power. Television technology has advanced to the point that viewers' physical movements and thoughts can be monitored through their television sets.

Almost all non-television technology has been discontinued or destroyed. The only real check on the power of the networks is Edison Carter, a crusading investigative journalist who regularly exposes the unethical practices of his own employer, and the team of allies both inside and outside the system who assist him in getting his reports to air and protecting him from the forces that wish to silence or kill him.

== Characters ==
=== Edison Carter ===
Edison Carter (Matt Frewer) is a hard-hitting reporter for Network 23. His superiors at the network are sometimes made uncomfortable by his reports, but they generally avoid direct interference due to the high ratings and worldwide audience of his muckraking program. Eventually, one of his discoveries requires him to flee his workspace, and he is injured in a motorcycle accident in a parking lot.

Edison cares about his co-workers, especially Theora Jones and Bryce Lynch, and he has a deep respect for his producer, Murray (although he rarely shows it).

=== Max Headroom ===
Max Headroom (Frewer) is a computer reconstruction of Carter, created after Bryce Lynch uploads a copy of his mind. He appears as a computer-rendered bust of Carter superimposed on a wire-frame background. Since Carter's last sight before the motorcycle crash is the sign "Max. headroom" on a parking garage gate, these are the reconstruction's first words and ultimately his name. While Carter is a dedicated professional, Max is a wisecracking observer of human contradictions.

Despite being the titular character, Max appears rarely in the show. While he occasionally plays a significant part in a plot—sometimes by traveling through networks to gain information or by revealing secrets about Carter that Carter himself would not divulge—his most frequent role is as comic relief, delivering brief quips in reaction to events or giving a humorous soliloquy at the end of an episode.

Although Max was created by Lynch, he quickly gains free will and can enter computer networks and interrupt television programming at will, often to the network's chagrin.

=== Theora Jones ===
Theora Jones first appeared in the British-made television pilot film for the series. She was Network 23's star controller ("stolen" from the World One Network by Murray) and, working with Edison, the network's star reporter, she often helped save the day for everyone. She was also a potential love interest for Edison, but that subplot was not explored fully on the show before it was cancelled.

Network 23's personnel files list her father as unknown, her mother as deceased, and her brother as Shawn Jones; Shawn is the focus on the second episode broadcast, "Rakers".

Theora Jones was played by Amanda Pays, who along with Matt Frewer and W. Morgan Sheppard, was one of only three cast members to also appear in the American-made series that followed.

=== Ben Cheviot ===
Cheviot (George Coe), was one of the executives on Network 23's board of directors. He later becomes the board's new chairman after Ned Grossberg is fired in the wake of the Blipvert incident. He is mostly ethical and almost invariably backs Edison Carter, occasionally against the wishes of the Network 23 board of directors. However, he has compromised himself on a few occasions when he felt the ratings for the Network would rise using methods that were questionable such as allowing the network to copyright the exclusive news of a terrorist organization, and mixing sex and politics. He once had an affair with board member Julia Fornby, though by the start of the show they had ended it long ago. Cheviot, while usually rolling over for his greatest client, did not do so when they attempted to supplant television networks themselves.

=== Bryce Lynch ===
Bryce Lynch (Chris Young), a child prodigy and computer hacker, is Network 23's one-man technology research department.

In the stereotypical hacker ethos, Bryce has few principles and fewer loyalties. He seems to accept any task, even morally questionable ones, as long as he is allowed to have the freedom to play with technology however he sees fit. This, in turn, makes him a greater asset to the technological needs and demands of the network, and the whims of its executives and stars. Unlike in the original British film, the American version of the character generally does not intentionally hurt others or infringe on their rights, making him a rare neutral character in the Max Headroom universe.

In the pilot episode of the series, Bryce is enlisted by evil network CEO Ned Grossberg (Charles Rocket) to investigate the mental patterns of unconscious reporter Edison Carter, to determine whether or not Carter has discovered the secrets of the "Blipverts" scandal. Bryce uploads the contents of Carter's memory into the Network 23 computer system, creating Max Headroom. It had been Bryce, following orders from Grossberg, who fought a hacking battle of sorts with Theora Jones that led to Edison hitting his head on a traffic barrier and falling unconscious.

After the first episode, Bryce is generally recruited by Carter and his controller, Theora Jones, to provide technical aid to their investigative reporting efforts.

=== Murray McKenzie ===
Murray (Jeffrey Tambor), Carter's serious and high-strung producer, whose job often becomes a balancing act between supporting Carter's stories and pleasing Network 23's executives. In his younger years he was also a field reporter and may have had some experience with the systems of a controller, though the system in his younger years had changed since and would not be reliable to replace one. When creating the "What I Want To Know Show" it was a toss-up between Edison Carter and another reporter and Murray "Choose The Best" a decision that would have future repercussions. Murray is divorced and sees his kids on weekends.

=== Blank Reg ===
Reg (W. Morgan Sheppard) is a "blank", a person not indexed in the government's database. He broadcasts the underground Big Time Television Network from his bus. He is a good friend of Edison Carter, and saves him on more than one occasion. With colleague/lover Dominique, he operates and is the onscreen voice of Big Time Television, "All day every day, making tomorrow seem like yesterday."

He dresses in a punk style and has a Mohawk haircut. He has an energetic personality and a strong nostalgic streak, defending antiquated music videos and printed books in equal measure, despite not having the ability to read.

=== Ned Grossberg ===
Ned Grossberg is a recurring villain on the series, played by Charles Rocket.

In the pilot episode, Grossberg is the chairman of Network 23, a major city television station with the highest-rated investigative-news show in town, hosted by Edison Carter. In the Max Headroom world, real-time ratings equal advertising dollars, and advertisements have replaced stocks as the measure of corporate worth.

Grossberg, with his secret prodigy Bryce Lynch, develops a high-speed advertising delivery method known as Blipverts, which condenses full advertisements into a few seconds. When Carter discovers that Blipverts are killing people, Grossberg orders Lynch to prevent Carter from getting out of the building. Knocked unconscious, Carter's memories are extracted into a computer by Lynch in order to determine whether Carter uncovered Grossberg's knowledge of the danger of Blipverts. The resulting computer file of the memory-extraction process becomes Max Headroom, making Grossberg directly responsible for the creation of the character. In the end, Grossberg is publicly exposed as responsible for the Blipverts scandal, and is removed as chairman of Network 23.

A few episodes later, in "Grossberg's Return", Grossberg reappears as a board member of Network 66. Again, he invents a dubious television viewing medium and convinces the chairman of the network to adopt it for political reasons knowing it's fraudulent. When the viewing method is shown to be a complete fraud, and a false news story threatens to be exposed, the resulting public reaction against the network leads to the chairman being removed, and Grossberg manages to assume the chairmanship. This results not only in public ridicule for both Network 23 and 66, but the said networks become bitter rivals afterward. Grossberg continues to find a means to boost the ratings of Network 66, being more cautious about his steps, but occasionally his own board members operate behind his back. He is still chairman of 66 by the end of the show.

When under stress, Grossberg exhibits a tic of slightly stretching his neck in his suit's collar, first seen in episode 1 when he confronts Lynch in his lab regarding Max retaining Carter's memory about the Blipverts.

In the UK telefilm Max Headroom: 20 Minutes Into the Future upon which the American series was based, the character was called Grossman and was played by Nickolas Grace.

=== Other characters ===
- Dominique (Concetta Tomei), co-proprietor of Big Time TV along with Blank Reg, managing the business aspects of running the station. It is implied that she and Reg are romantically involved, if not husband and wife. Although Dominique may not be a blank like Reg, as she possesses credit tubes, she behaves culturally as one.
- Breughel (Jere Burns), an intelligent, sociopathic criminal-for-hire who, along with Mahler, makes money disposing of corpses for other criminals by selling them to body banks around the city. However, he is not above selling out his employers if it means a big payoff, a fact which Edison Carter takes advantage of on several occasions while working on stories.
- Mahler (Rick Ducommun), Breughel's accomplice, who serves primarily as the muscle of the duo's body-harvesting operation. In "Dream Thieves", it is revealed that Breughel killed Mahler and sold off his body during a slow night of business, and replaced him with a new man whom he nicknamed "Mahler" as a mocking tribute.
- Rik (J.W. Smith), a streetwise pedicab driver whom Edison Carter frequently employs when looking for information about the city's underworld.
- Blank Bruno (Peter Crook), Bryce's mentor, who is a revolutionary Blank who works to make life better for the city's Blank population by any means short of murder. He has a pet toad, which he calls "Gob".
- Blank Traker (Brian Brophy, Season 1 / Michael Preston, Season 2), one of Bruno's fellow revolutionaries.
- Martinez (Ricardo Gutierrez), one of Network 23's helicopter pilots, he often works with Carter when he is out on assignment.
- Janie Crane (Lisa Niemi), one of Network 23's second-tier reporters, who ends up breaking a few important stories of her own throughout the series.
- Angie Barry (Rosalind Chao), one of Network 23's second-tier reporters. She often fills-in for Carter when he is indisposed.
- Joel Dung Po (Rob Narita), one of Network 23's second-tier reporters.
- Julia Formby (Virginia Kiser), one of Network 23's board members. In "Body Banks", it is revealed that she once had an affair with Cheviot, for which she is blackmailed by a wealthy member of the Plantagenet family into stealing Max Headroom from Network 23 in the hope that Max's program might be used to preserve the mind of his mother.
- Gene Ashwell (Hank Garrett), one of Network 23's board members, who frequently panics when the network faces a crisis. It is revealed in "Deities" that he is a member of the Vu-Age Church, and is responsible for kidnapping Max on behalf of the church's leader.
- Ms. Lauren (Sharon Barr), one of Network 23's board members. Replaced Formby on the board after Formby grew weary of "handling things at night".
- Mr. Edwards (Lee Wilkof), one of Network 23's board members. He has a groveling disposition, and regards ratings as more important than life itself. Once cried at the thought of no one watching the network, and compared the potential end of network television to the end of the world.
- Simon Peller (Sherman Howard), a corrupt politician who receives financial backing from Network 23. He shares a mutual animosity with Carter, who despises Peller's underhanded political tactics.
- Mr. Bartlett (Andreas Katsulas), one of the board members of Network 66. An incautious risk-taker, he frequently becomes directly involved in the network's shady projects, going behind even Ned Grossberg's back on occasion.
- Chubb Shaw (James F. Dean), one of the board members of Network 66.
- Dragul (John Durbin), a Network censor who disregards Blanks, and lives by the orders of computers even in defeat.
- Ped Xing (Arsenio Trinidad, Season 1 / Sab Shimono, Season 2), the head of the Zik-Zak corporation, Network 23's primary sponsor.

== Development and production ==
The series was based on the Channel 4 British TV film produced by Chrysalis, Max Headroom: 20 Minutes into the Future. Cinemax aired the UK pilot followed by a six-week run of highlights from The Max Headroom Show, a UK music video show where Headroom appears between music videos. ABC took an interest in the pilot and asked Chrysalis/Lakeside to produce the series for American audiences.

Max Headroom: 20 Minutes into the Future was re-shot as a pilot program for a new series broadcast by the U.S. ABC television network. The pilot featured plot changes and some minor visual touches, but retained the same basic storyline. The only original cast retained for the series were Matt Frewer (Max Headroom/Edison Carter) and Amanda Pays (Theora Jones); a third original cast member, W. Morgan Sheppard, joined the series as "Blank Reg" in later episodes. Among the non-original cast, Jeffrey Tambor co-starred as "Murray", Edison Carter's neurotic producer. On January, the series was ordered to continue with the air-date of March 27th.

The show went into production in late 1986 and ran for six episodes in the first season and eight in the second. It is the first show in the US to have been shot at 30 fps, as well as the first to mix video and film for storytelling.

Names of uncredited members in the production team are seen briefly scattered within the opening and wallas that the makers of the show had secretly put, in response to strict policies in television regarding screen space and time, as well as the network's denial to credit the original UK creators. Peter Wagg mentioned in an interview that they would send in their scripts last minute and include frivolous additions that would have to be taken out to make sure enough of their creative integrity could be overlooked and kept in. At the wrap-party for the show, he'd met the Standards-and-Practices people at ABC, who told him they had knew about their antics, "... they played the game with us and they loved it".

== Episodes ==
=== Season 1 (1987) ===
No. overall	No. in season	Title	Directed by	Written by	Original release date
1	1	"Blipverts"	Farhad Mann	T : Joe Gannon & Steve Roberts	March 31, 1987
In the near-future, investigative TV news reporter Edison Carter uncovers the disturbing secret of a new TV advert device in use by his own employers, Network 23, called "Blipverts", high-intensity high-speed advertisements with the side effect of overloading people's nervous systems, causing them to short circuit or explode. In an attempt to flee with evidence he is caught after a motor accident. The head of Network 23, Ned Grossberg, attempts to find what he knows by brainscan. The resulting AI construct comes to life as Max Headroom.
2	2	"Rakers"	Thomas J. Wright	T : Steve Roberts; S/T : James Crocker	April 7, 1987
When Theora walks away from her work terminal in the middle of a job, Carter soon discovers that she has been trying to find her missing brother, Shawn, who has become involved in "raking", a dangerous new underground sport that combines motorized skateboarding with gladiatorial combat. The "sport" is in the process of being sold to Network 23 as a ratings booster, as Max Headroom broadcasts a stand against televised violence and the Network 23 Television show "Missile Mike".
3	3	"Body Banks"	Francis Delia	Steve Roberts	April 14, 1987
A woman is abducted off the street by Breughel and Mahler as an involuntary organ donor for a transplant operation. The woman's boyfriend goes to Carter and Blank Reg for help tracking her down. Meanwhile, Max demands to know some details about some fuzzy parts of Carter's (and hence his) memory. Elsewhere, Cheviot encourages Edison to meet his demands as Max is needed as a spokesman for Zik-Zak Corporation to replace the discontinued Blipverts.
4	4	"Security Systems"	Tommy Lee Wallace	Michael Cassutt	April 21, 1987
Carter attempts to uncover the identity of an unknown buyer attempting to acquire Security Systems, the biggest security company in the world, but soon finds himself on the run from the police when his identity is altered and he is charged with credit fraud, a crime "Worse than Murder". Carter's only hope is to join with Murray, Theora, Bryce, and Blank Reg, from Big Time Television to infiltrate Security Systems headquarters itself to restore his profile while Max deals with A-7, the Artificial Intelligent program that runs their whole system.
5	5	"War"	Thomas J. Wright	Martin Pasko & Rebecca Parr and Steve Roberts & Michael Cassutt	April 28, 1987
A terrorist group called the White Brigade claims responsibility for a series of live, televised bombings, with the aid of one of Network 23's competitors, BreakThru TV. Carter and company investigate and soon uncover the truth: the terrorists are working with a sleazy programming package distributor who sells exclusive rights to coverage of their attacks to finance their activities. The situation gets out of control when the Brigade bombs the ratings marketplace, and later attempts to kill Network 23 reporter Janie Crane who had been investigating the story and their leader, Croyd Hauser.
6	6	"The Blanks"	Tommy Lee Wallace	Steve Roberts	May 5, 1987
Simon Peller, Network 23's Political representative is elected to Government and goes after the Blanks (people who have removed their identities from the central databanks) arresting each one. A militant Blank, named Bruno, threatens to use a viral program to wipe out the city's entire computer network and everything connected to it, including Max. Carter looks to Blank Reg once again for help in dealing with Bruno as Bryce works on a "Trojan Sheep" to reverse the situation before a demolition charge detonates on the van of Big Time Television.

=== Season 2 (1987–88) ===
No. overall	No. in season	Title	Directed by	Written by	Original release date
7	1	"Academy"	Victor Lobl	David Brown	September 18, 1987
Blank Reg is arrested for "zipping" (hijacking) Network 23's satellite feeds, and is put on trial on a courtroom game show for his life. Meanwhile, Carter and Theora learn the truth from Bryce: the zipping attacks are really being carried out by a group of child students from ACS, the Academy of Computer Sciences, from which Bryce graduated. Bryce must come to a moral decision before Reg is made an example of by the network.
8	2	"Deities"	Thomas J. Wright	Michael Cassutt	September 25, 1987
Carters Ex-girlfriend Vannah Smith, the leader of the Vu Age church, kidnaps Max from Network 23 and threatens to erase him to prevent Carter from running a story exposing the church's false claim of saving its parishioners' minds as AI constructs for a future resurrection. The Constructs are inferior pictures that only say a few phrases, and Carters report would ruin them. But the biggest mystery is how Max got kidnapped at all.
9	3	"Grossberg's Return"	Janet Greek	Steve Roberts	October 2, 1987
Network 23's rival TV network, Network 66, develops a scheme to get votes for the upcoming gubernatorial election. The viewdoze system, a false device that claims you can watch as you sleep. Former Network 23 CEO Ned Grossberg returns where he turns Network 23's attention away by creating a false scandal concerning Network 66 own political representative Harriet Garth. Through this false story Grossberg takes over as the new CEO of Network 66, and is planning to rig the election to get 66's candidate into office. When this fails networks 23 & 66 go to war on one another.
10	4	"Dream Thieves"	Todd Holland	S : Charles Grant Craig; T : Steve Roberts	October 9, 1987
In an bid to get an edge over the major networks, a sleazy subscription cable channel turns to airing recorded dream sequences. Carter begins researching a story on dream recording, after an old rival and friend Paddy Ashton is found dead. He learns that the process can have fatal side effects for the donors, and he goes Rogue in order to shut them down himself. It's up to Murray to stop his vigilante actions as Carter performs them on live television.
11	5	"Whackets"	Victor Lobl	S : Dennis Rolfe; T : Arthur Sellers	October 16, 1987
Survivors of a buildings collapse are running into the wreckage to rescue their Television sets, all of which are tuned to a game show called Whackets being broadcast by Big Time Television in a test by two sleezy broadcasters. Carter investigates after a police chief is murdered, and learns that the show hooks its viewers, including Max, with an addictive subliminal signal. Grossberg at Network 66 looks for a way to get his hands on the show, and after Big Time ceases the Broadcast, Carter must stop Max from airing a recording of it on 23 before their license gets pulled for broadcasting an illegal signal. Guest Star: Bill Maher
12	6	"Neurostim"	Maurice Phillips	Michael Cassutt & Arthur Sellers	April 28, 1988
Zik-Zak's new promotional giveaway, the Neurostim bracelet, implants pleasurable fantasy images, and overwhelming urges to buy Zik-Zak products directly into people's minds. They hope to eliminate network television itself and take over the markets with their new gimmick. When Carter gets too close to the truth behind the new promotion while researching his latest story, the promotion's developers plan to throw him off the trail by giving him a special, highly addictive Neurostim bracelet that gives him urges to put himself in danger. His only hope lies with Max Headroom to interfere with the program, but Carter is recently not on good terms with Max after Network 23 claims Max is the ratings grabber.
13	7	"Lessons"	Victor Lobl	S : Colman DeKay & Howard Brookner; T : Adrian Hein & Steve Roberts	May 5, 1988
Carter discovers that Network 23's automated censor system is sending the metro-police to arrest Blanks who are gaining unauthorized access to pay-per-view educational programs, the only source of education for homeless children. The situation also endangers the daughter of one of the blanks, as she has ability to read. Carter must come to the aid of Blank Bruno again, to save an underground printing press from Dragel the network 23 Censor head, who takes his orders from a computer.
14	8	"Baby Grobags"	Janet Greek	S : Chris Ruppenthal; S/T : Adrian Hein	September 10, 1995
While researching Ovuvat a place that grows genetically engineered "designer babies", Carter discovers that babies with exceptionally high Intelligence are being stolen from their parents and illegally cloned just before being "born" to be used for a new TV show on Network 66. Ned Grossberg makes an enticing offer to Bryce to join Network 66 to lead the show. The investigation takes Carter into Network 66 itself for a face-to-face confrontation with Grossberg in an effort to rescue the newborn child of Helen Zeno, a friend of Theora's.

=== Notes ===
- Although unaired as part of the original U.S. run, "Baby Grobags" was shown as part of the Australian series run.
- At least one unproduced script, "Theora's Tale", has surfaced, as have the titles of two other stories ("The Trial" and "Xmas"). Currently, little is known of "The Trial" aside from its title; George R. R. Martin wrote "Xmas", in pre-production at cancellation time; "Theora's Tale" would have featured the "Video Freedom Alliance" kidnapping Theora, and war in Antarctica, between rival advertisers Zik Zak and Zlin.

== Home media ==
Shout! Factory (under license from Warner Bros. Home Entertainment) released Max Headroom: The Complete Series on DVD in the United States and Canada on August 10, 2010. The bonus features includes a round-table discussion with most of the major cast members (other than Matt Frewer), and interviews with the writers and producers.

== Other media ==
In 1989, Bastei Lübbe published a set of novelizations written by Hajo F. Breuer, which follows the first four episodes. Distributed only in Germany, it has no official english translation. Additionally, Karussell released a radio-play directed and written by Michael Erdmann consisting of five double-sided cassettes re-telling season one and some of season two with a German cast.

== Reception ==
The series began as a mid-season replacement in spring of 1987, and did well enough to be renewed for the fall television season, but the viewer ratings could not be sustained in direct competition with CBS's Top 20 hit Dallas (also produced by Lorimar) and NBC's Top 30 hit Miami Vice. Max Headroom was canceled part-way into its second season. The entire series, along with two previously unbroadcast episodes, was rerun in spring 1988 during the Writers Guild of America strike. In the late 1990s, U.S. cable TV channels Bravo and the Sci-Fi Channel re-ran the series. Reruns also briefly appeared on TechTV in 2002. A cinema spin-off titled Max Headroom for President was announced with production intended to start in early 1988 in order to capitalize on the 1988 United States presidential election, but it was never made.

Max Headroom has been called "the first cyberpunk television series", with "deep roots in the Western philosophical tradition".

=== Accolades ===
Year	Award	Category	Episode	Nominee(s)	Result
1987	Primetime Creative Arts Emmy Awards	Outstanding Art Direction for a Series	"Blipverts"	Richard B. Lewis, Bernard P. Cutler, Leslie McCarthy-Frankenheimer	Won
1987	Primetime Creative Arts Emmy Awards	Outstanding Hairstyling for a Series	"Body Banks"	Janice Alexander	Nominated
1987	Primetime Creative Arts Emmy Awards	Outstanding Makeup for a Series	"Security Systems"	Katalin Elek, Zoltan Elek	Nominated
1987	Primetime Creative Arts Emmy Awards	Outstanding Sound Editing for a Series	"Blipverts"	Doug Grindstaff, Richard Corwin, Clark Conrad, Brad Sherman, Richard Taylor, James Wolvington, Dick Bernstein	Won
1987	Primetime Creative Arts Emmy Awards	Outstanding Sound Mixing for a Series	"Blipverts"	Gary Alexander, Joe Kenworthy, Tim Philben, Bill Thiederman	Won

== Reboot ==
In 2022, a reboot of Max Headroom was announced, with Halt and Catch Fire co-creator Christopher Cantwell set to serve as the showrunner. Original Max Headroom actor Matt Frewer is slated to reprise his role in the revived series.

== See also ==
- The Max Headroom Show
- Max Headroom signal hijacking
