= Rocky Morton =

British film and television director

- Born: Rocky Morton; 1955 (age 70–71); United Kingdom
- Occupation: Film director
- Years active: 1979–present
- Known for: Feature films, commercials; music videos
- Spouse: Annabel Jankel (div. 2005)
- Website: rockymorton.com

Rocky Morton (born 1955) is an English painter and music video, television, and film director. He is the co-creator of the TV series Max Headroom and co-director of the 1993 Hollywood Pictures film Super Mario Bros. Various music videos by Tom Tom Club, Talking Heads, Gravity Kills, Orgy, George Harrison and Miles Davis are credited to Morton. He and his then-partner, Annabel Jankel, made their television debut with the original Max Headroom: 20 Minutes into the Future, and its Americanized version. The duo made their big-screen debut with D.O.A., starring Dennis Quaid and Meg Ryan.
