= Diego Vicentini =

Venezuelan film maker

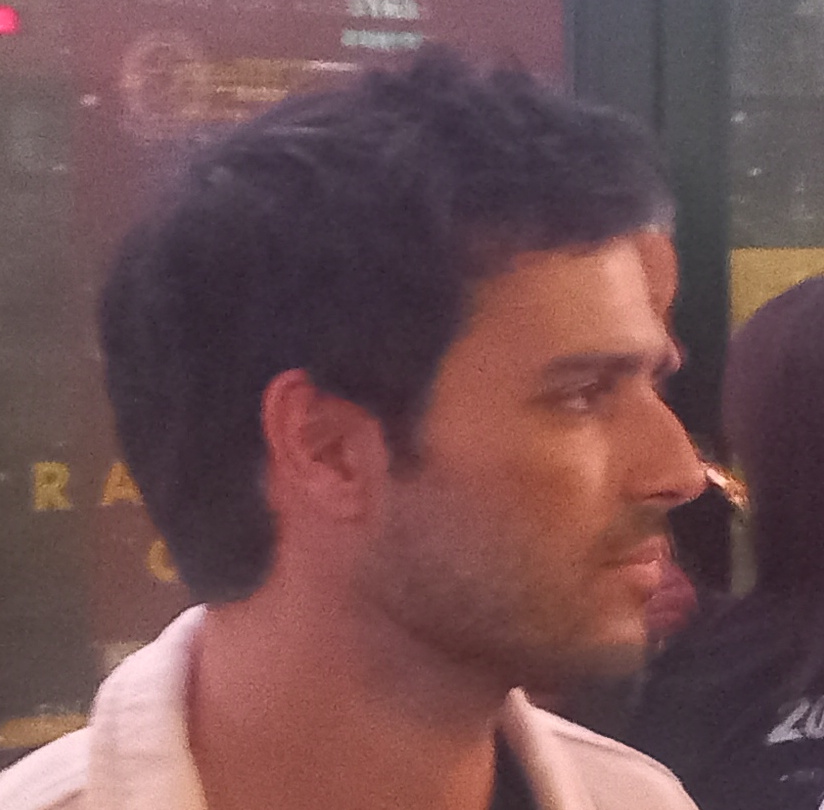
- Diego Vicentini in 2023
- Born: 1994 (age 30–31); Caracas, Venezuela
- Education: New York Film Academy (MFA Filmmaking, 2018) Boston College (Bachelor's Degree in Finance, 2016)
- Alma mater: Los Angeles Film School
- Occupation: Film director

Diego Vicentini (born 1994) is a Venezuelan film maker. His debut feature film, Simón, was nominated for the 38th Goya Awards in the Best Ibero-American film category in representation of Venezuela and reached the #6 spot on Netflix's Global Top 10 between March 4th to March 10th in 2024 for non-english movies.

== Education ==
Vicentini studied at the Boston College in the Bachelor's Degree in finance program, and the Los Angeles Film School, where he produced a short film about the 2017 Venezuelan protests, Simón (2018), as part of his thesis for his master's degree in film.

== Career ==
The short film was released in 2018 in eight countries and following its unexpected reception, Vicentini decided to turn it into a feature film. The homonymous movie, Simón (2023), was Vicentini's debut feature film and it premiered on 15 April 2023 at the Florida Film Festival in Orlando. The film would go on to be chosen by the Venezuelan Academy of Motion Picture Arts and Sciences to represent Venezuela in the 38th Goya Awards.

== Filmography ==
- Simón (2018) (short film)
- Simón (2023)
