= Malcolm McLaren discography =

- Studio albums: 8
- Extended plays: 2
- Soundtrack albums: 3
- Compilation albums: 1
- Singles: 20
- Video albums: 1
- Music videos: 9
- Remix albums: 1

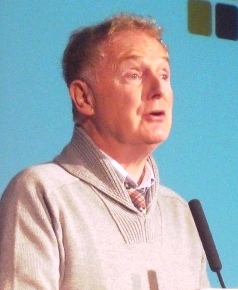
Malcolm McLaren

The discography of Malcolm McLaren, English performer, impresario, self-publicist and former manager of the Sex Pistols and the New York Dolls, consists of eight studio albums, one compilation, one remix album, two soundtracks, two extended plays and eighteen singles.

== Studio albums ==
| Year | Title | Chart positions | | | | | Certifications (sales thresholds) |
| Year | Title | UK | AUS | NZ | SWE | US | Certifications (sales thresholds) |
|---|---|---|---|---|---|---|---|
| 1983 | Duck Rock (as Malcolm McLaren & The World's Famous Supreme Team): Released: 27 May 1983; Label: Charisma Records | 18 | 13 | 21 | – | – | UK: Silver |
| 1984 | Fans: Released: December 1984; Label: Charisma | 47 | – | 29 | – | 190 | |
| 1985 | Swamp Thing: Released: 11 November 1985; Label: Charisma | – | – | – | – | – | |
| 1989 | Waltz Darling (as Malcolm McLaren & The Bootzilla Orchestra): Released: 13 July 1989; Label: Epic Records | 30 | 60 | 7 | 47 | – | |
| 1990 | Round the Outside! Round the Outside! (Malcolm McLaren presents the World-Famous Supreme Team Show): Released: 22 November 1990; Label: Virgin Records | – | 57 | 6 | – | – | |
| 1994 | Paris: Released: 30 May 1994 (Double album version released 1995); Label: Disques Vogue/No! | 44 | – | – | – | – | |
| 2005 | Tranquilize: Released: 2005; Label: Most Records, Habitat | – | – | – | – | – | |
"–" denotes releases that did not chart or were not released in that territory.

== Compilation albums ==
| Year | Title |
|---|---|
| 1998 | Buffalo Gals – Back to Skool (Malcolm McLaren & The World's Famous Supreme Team vs. Rakim, KRS-One, Soulson, Hannibal Lechter, Da Boogie Man, T'Kalla): Released: 25 September 1998; Label: Caroline Records (US), Virgin Records (Europe) |

== Remix albums ==
| Year | Title |
|---|---|
| 1994 | The Largest Movie House in Paris: Released: 1994; Label: Gee Street Records |

== Soundtracks ==
- Carry On Columbus (1992) (as Fantastic Planet) – music written and produced by Malcolm McLaren and Lee Gorman, performed by Jayne Collins and Debbie Holmes
- LUST 2 – Seven Deadly Sins (1992) – Short film directed by Maria Beatty, original music by McLaren
- Catwalk (1996) – Documentary film directed by Robert Leacock, music written and produced by Malcolm McLaren and Lee Gorman

== Extended plays ==
| Year | Title | Chart positions | | |
| Year | Title | UK | US | US R&B |
|---|---|---|---|---|
| 1983 | D'ya Like Scratchin'? (as Malcolm McLaren & The World's Famous Supreme Team): Released: 1983; Label: Island Records | – | 173 | 43 |
| 1984 | Would Ya Like More Scratchin'? (as Malcolm McLaren & The World's Famous Supreme Team): Released: 1984 (released in Europe and Canada only); Label: Charisma | 44 | – | – |
"–" denotes releases that did not chart.

- Would Ya Like More Scratchin'? is a 1984 re-release of the 1983 US EP D'ya Like Scratchin'? that was strictly released in Europe and Canada and never made it to American shores. The revamped EP featured one more track (the title track, which served as a remix counterpart to the first track, "D'ya Like Scratchin'?") which was never released in the US and was never reissued on any other release or compilation.

== Singles ==
| Year | Title | Chart positions | | | | | | | | | | | Certifications | Album |
| Year | Title | UK | AUS | AUT | CHE | GER | FRA | IRL | NLD | NZ | SWE | US Dance | Certifications | Album |
|---|---|---|---|---|---|---|---|---|---|---|---|---|---|---|
| 1982 | "Buffalo Gals" (Malcolm McLaren & The World's Famous Supreme Team) | 9 | 19 | 19 | 9 | 20 | – | 16 | – | 3 | 13 | 33 | UK: Silver | Duck Rock |
| 1983 | "Soweto" (Malcolm McLaren & The McLarenettes) | 32 | 53 | – | – | – | – | – | – | 31 | – | – | | Duck Rock |
| 1983 | "Double Dutch" (Malcolm McLaren & The Ebonettes) | 3 | 14 | – | – | 14 | – | 7 | – | 10 | – | 47 | UK: Silver | Duck Rock |
| 1983 | "Duck for the Oyster" (Malcolm McLaren & The Main Hilltopper Man) | 54 | – | – | – | – | – | 28 | – | – | – | – | | Duck Rock |
| 1984 | "Madam Butterfly (Un bel di vedremo)" | 13 | 16 | – | – | 36 | – | 10 | 19 | 48 | – | 19 | | Fans |
| 1985 | "Carmen" | 79 | – | – | – | – | – | – | – | 32 | – | – | | Fans |
| 1985 | "Duck Rock Cheer" | – | – | – | – | – | – | – | – | – | – | – | | Swamp Thing |
| 1989 | "Waltz Darling" (Malcolm McLaren & The Bootzilla Orchestra) | 31 | 65 | – | – | 18 | – | – | 20 | 6 | – | 39 | | Waltz Darling |
| 1989 | "Something's Jumpin' in Your Shirt" (Malcolm McLaren & The Bootzilla Orchestra feat. Lisa Marie) | 29 | – | – | – | 45 | – | – | 9 | 12 | – | 39 | | Waltz Darling |
| 1989 | "Deep in Vogue" (Malcolm McLaren & The Bootzilla Orchestra) | 83 | 107 | – | – | – | – | – | – | – | – | 1 | | Waltz Darling |
| 1990 | "House of the Blue Danube" (Malcolm McLaren & The Bootzilla Orchestra) | 73 | 150 | – | – | – | – | – | – | – | – | – | | Waltz Darling |
| 1990 | "Call a Wave" (Malcolm McLaren & The Bootzilla Orchestra) | – | – | – | – | – | – | – | – | – | – | – | | Waltz Darling |
| 1990 | "Operaa House" (Malcolm McLaren Presents The World Famous Supreme Team Show) | 75 | 18 | – | – | – | – | – | 17 | 4 | – | – | | Round the Outside! Round the Outside! |
| 1990 | "Romeo & Juliet" (Malcolm McLaren Presents The World Famous Supreme Team Show featuring Grandmaster Caz) | – | – | – | – | – | – | – | – | – | – | – | | Round the Outside! Round the Outside! |
| 1991 | "Magic's Back" (Theme from 'The Ghosts of Oxford Street') (Malcolm McLaren feat. Alison Limerick) | 42 | – | – | – | – | – | – | – | – | – | – | | — |
| 1992 | "Carry On Columbus" (as Fantastic Planet) | – | – | – | – | – | – | – | – | – | – | – | | Carry On Columbus (soundtrack) |
| 1994 | "Paris Paris" (Malcolm McLaren & Catherine Deneuve) | – | – | – | – | – | 26 | – | – | – | – | – | | Paris |
| 1995 | "Revenge of the Flowers" (Françoise Hardy & Malcolm McLaren) | – | – | – | – | – | – | – | – | – | – | – | | Paris |
| 1998 | "Buffalo Gals Stampede" (Malcolm McLaren & The World's Famous Supreme Team versus Rakim & Roger Sanchez) | 65 | – | – | – | – | – | – | – | – | – | – | | Buffalo Gals – Back to Skool |
| 2004 | "Fashion Beast Party" | – | – | – | – | – | – | – | – | – | – | – | | Tranquilize |
"–" denotes releases that did not chart or were not released in that territory.

== Videos ==
- Duck Rock (VHS, RCA/Columbia Pictures Home Video, 1985)

== Music videos ==
Note that the list is incomplete.

- "Buffalo Gals"
- "Soweto"
- "Double Dutch"
- "Duck for the Oyster"
- "Madam Butterfly (Un bel di vedremo)"
- "Waltz Darling"
- "Something's Jumpin' in Your Shirt"
- "Deep in Vogue"
- "House of the Blue Danube" (directed by Lez Barstow)
- "Paris Paris"
- "La Main Parisienne"

The Duck Rock longform video release contains videos for the album tracks "Punk It Up", "Jive My Baby", "Obatala" and "Merengue", the B sides "D'ya Like Scratchin'?", "Zulu's On A Time Bomb" and "She's Looking Like A Hobo" and the outtake "Roly Poly".

== Contributions ==
- Jungk DEMO Tracks: I want, Chase the Dragon (1998) produced by Malcolm McLaren
- "Heather's Song" (2016) by Tommy MV$ERVTI co-produced by Malcolm McLaren (posthumously)
