= Double Dutch (song) =

1983 single by Malcolm McLaren

Single by Malcolm McLaren

from the album Duck Rock
- B-side: "She's Looking Like a Hobo"
- Released: 24 June 1983
- Recorded: 1982
- Genre: World music
- Length: 3:38 (7" version); 5:53 (album version)
- Label: Charisma
- Songwriters: Malcolm McLaren; Trevor Horn; Big Jack Lerole; Petrus Manele; Lulu Masilela; Dingane Vilakazi
- Producer: Trevor Horn

Malcolm McLaren singles chronology
"Soweto" (1983)	"Double Dutch" (1983)	"Duck for the Oyster" (1983)

"Double Dutch" is a 1983 single by Malcolm McLaren. It is taken from his debut album Duck Rock. "Double Dutch" is the follow-up to his successful debut single "Buffalo Gals", and reached number 3 on the UK Singles Chart, making it his highest-charting single release. The album version is a slight re-edit of the single, with part of the original middle eight moved to the end of the track.

The song concerns the skipping game of the same name, with McLaren's narration mentioning several New York double Dutch troupes by name, notably the Ebonettes, whose name is also used as a chant in the chorus. The music video for the song features McLaren and troupes from the American Double Dutch League performing in a school gymnasium.

The South African Mbaqanga group Boyoyo Boys sued McLaren for music plagiarism over the similarity of "Double Dutch" to their own 1975 hit "Puleng". After a lengthy legal battle in the UK, the matter was settled out of court, with payment made to the South African copyright holders, songwriter Petrus Maneli and publisher Gallo Music, but Trevor Horn and McLaren retained their songwriting credits. However, Manele, Vilakazi, Lerole and Masilela have since been added to "Double Dutch" as credited composers.

== Track listings ==
7"

1. "Double Dutch" – 3:40
2. "She's Looking Like a Hobo" – 3:31

7" (US)

1. "Double Dutch" – 3:20
2. "Radio Show (D'Ya Like Scratchin')" – 3:46

12"

1. "Double Dutch" (with the Ebonettes) – 8:21
2. "She's Looking Like a Hobo" (with the World's Famous Supreme Team) – 2:58
3. "D'Ya Like Scratchin'" (with the World's Famous Supreme Team) – 3:45

12" (US)

1. "Double Dutch" (long version) – 8:25
2. "Hobo Scratch (She's Looking Like a Hobo)" – 9:15

== Charts ==
Chart (1983)	Peak position
Australia (Kent Music Report)	14
Ireland (IRMA)	7
Israel (Kol Yisrael)	8
New Zealand (Recorded Music NZ)	10
UK Singles (OCC)	3
US Dance Club Songs (Billboard)	47
West Germany (GfK)	14

== Sampling and usage ==
The track was heavily sampled by house music group Dope Smugglaz on their 1999 track "Double Double Dutch".

The lyrics of the song are referenced in Liz Phair's song "Whip-Smart".

The song was featured in the 2013 film The Wolf of Wall Street.
