= Un bel dì, vedremo =

Aria from the opera Madama Butterfly, composed by Giacomo Puccini

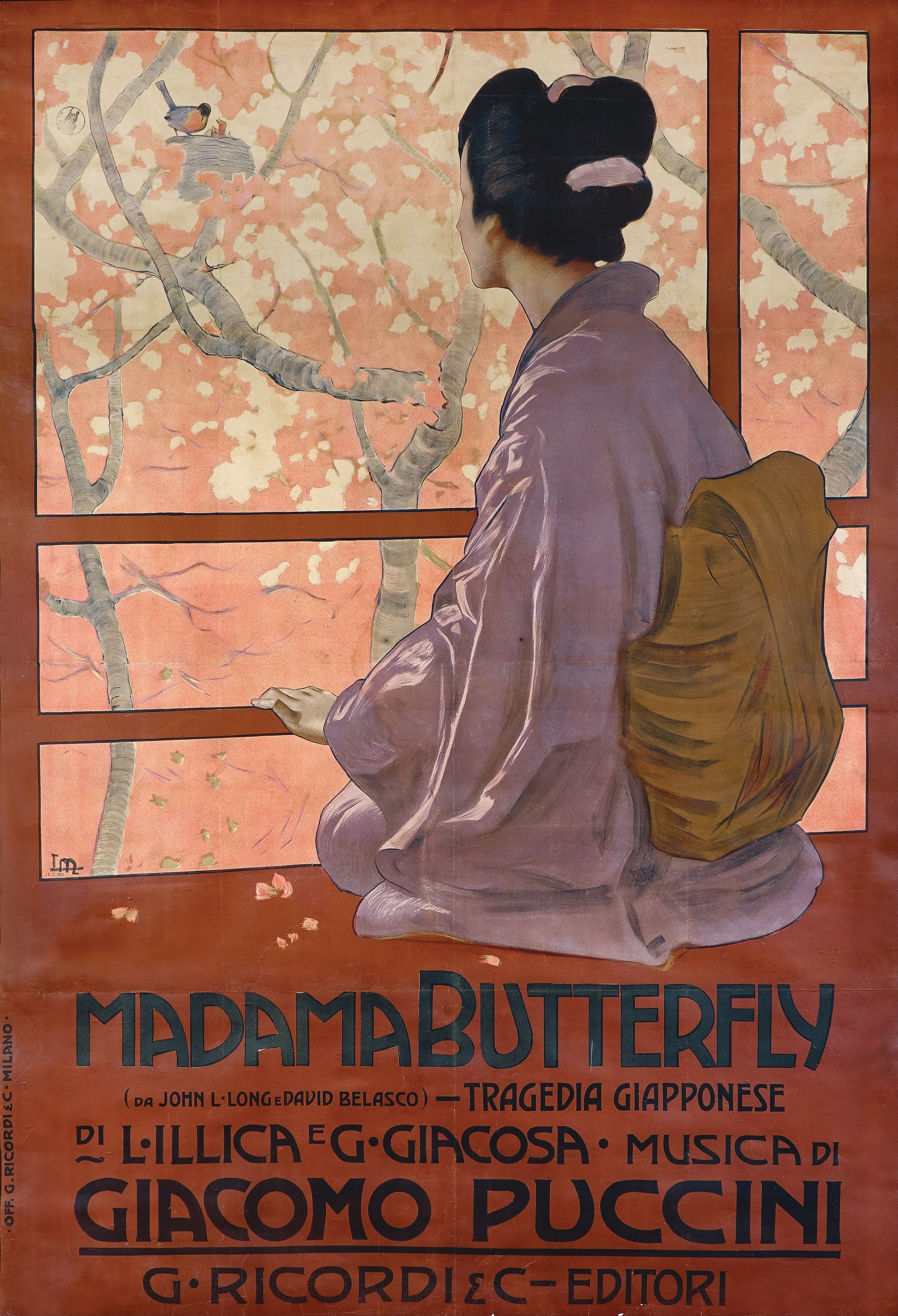
1904 poster for Madama Butterfly by Leopoldo Metlicovitz

"Un bel dì, vedremo" (Italian pronunciation: [um bɛl di veˈdreːmo]; "One fine day we'll see") is a soprano aria from the opera Madama Butterfly (1904) by Giacomo Puccini, set to a libretto by Luigi Illica and Giuseppe Giacosa. It is sung by Cio-Cio San (Butterfly) on stage with Suzuki, as she imagines the return of her absent love, Pinkerton. It is the most famous aria in Madama Butterfly, and one of the most popular pieces in the entire soprano repertoire.

== Dramatic setting ==
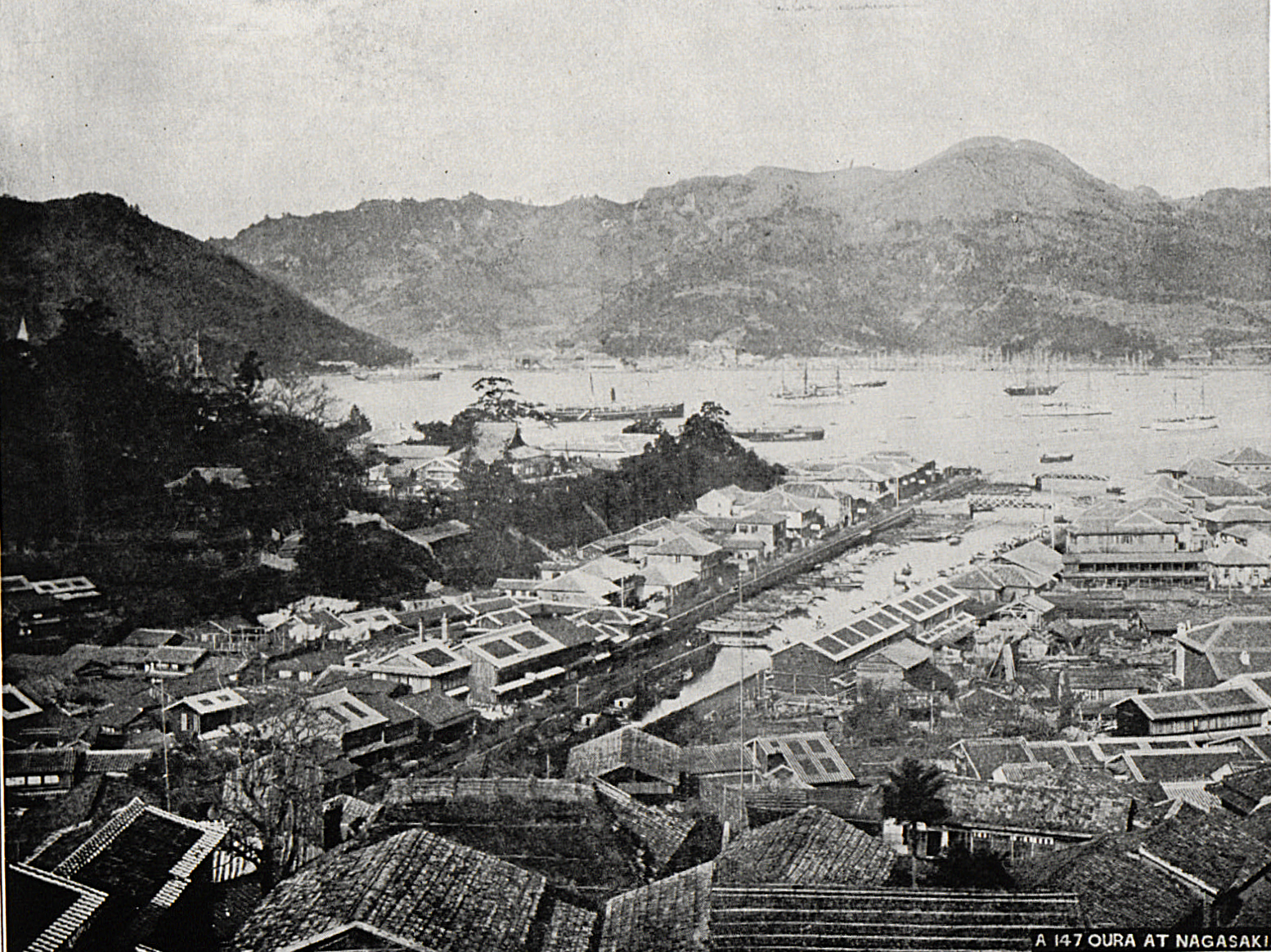
Nagasaki Harbour, the scene of Cio-Cio San's reverie, in 1900

Early in act 2, three years after her marriage to U.S. naval officer B. F. Pinkerton, Cio-Cio San ("Butterfly") awaits the return of her long-absent husband to Japan. Her maid, Suzuki, does not believe that Pinkerton will come back, but Butterfly is optimistic. Trying to convince Suzuki of Pinkerton's loyalty, Butterfly sings of an imaginary scene in which a thread of smoke on the far horizon signals the arrival of a white ship into Nagasaki harbour, bringing her long-lost love back to her. The imagined scene culminates in a romantic reunion.

The aria is noted for its lyrical beauty. It is of particular dramatic importance, as Butterfly's yearning expressed in the song is later met with tragedy. Butterfly's longed-for "beautiful day" is heralded at the end of act 2 by the arrival of Pinkerton's ship, but it proves to be her last; Butterfly learns that Pinkerton has married another woman, and at the end of the opera, Butterfly, distraught, takes her own life. "Un bel dì, vedremo" is especially significant as it appeals to audiences with its emotive melody but also encapsulates the tragedy at the heart of the opera, foretelling Cio-Cio San's inevitable demise.

== Performance and recordings ==
"Un bel dì" (One fine day)
Recorded in 1919, performed by Rosa Ponselle with orchestra

The aria was first performed by the soprano Rosina Storchio at the premiere of Madama Butterfly on 17 February 1904 at the Teatro alla Scala in Milan. In the revised version of the opera (28 May 1904 at the Teatro Grande, in Brescia) it was sung by the Ukrainian soprano Solomiya Krushelnytska. During the early recording era, soprano Agnes Kimball achieved popularity in the United States with her English language recording of the aria under the title "Some day he'll come" which was released by the Victor Talking Machine Company in 1910.

Deanna Durbin performed the English translation of the aria in the 1939 musical film First Love.

In 1984, the pop musician Malcolm McLaren adapted the aria for his single "Madam Butterfly (Un bel dì, vedremo)", a synth-pop remix of opera and 1980s R&B. The song, which appeared on McLaren's album Fans, reached No. 13 in the UK Singles Chart.

== Lyrics ==
"Un bel dì, vedremo" occurs in act 2 in both the original and the revised versions of the opera. This Italian text is taken from the first version of the libretto, published by Ricordi in 1904.

Un bel dì, vedremo
levarsi un fil di fumo sull'estremo
confin del mare.
E poi la nave appare.
Poi la nave bianca
entra nel porto, romba il suo saluto.

Vedi? È venuto!
Io non gli scendo incontro. Io no. Mi metto
là sul ciglio del colle e aspetto, e aspetto
gran tempo e non mi pesa
la lunga attesa.

E ... uscito dalla folla cittadina
un uomo, un picciol punto
s'avvia per la collina.

Chi sarà? Chi sarà?
E come sarà giunto
che dirà? Che dirà?
Chiamerà "Butterfly" dalla lontana.
Io senza dar risposta
me ne starò nascosta
un po' per celia ... e un po' per non morire
al primo incontro, ed egli alquanto in pena
chiamerà, chiamerà:
"Piccina mogliettina,
olezzo di verbena,"
i nomi che mi dava al suo venire.

(a Suzuki)
Tutto questo avverrà,
te lo prometto.
Tienti la tua paura – io con sicura
fede l'aspetto.

One fine day we'll notice
a thread of smoke arising
on the sea, in the far horizon,
and then the ship appearing;
then the trim white vessel
glides into the harbour, thunders forth her cannon.

See you? Now he is coming!
I do not go to meet him. Not I.
I stay upon the brow of the hillock, and wait there,
and wait for a long time, but never weary
of the long waiting.

From out the crowded city there is coming
a man, a little speck
in the distance, climbing the hillock.

Can you guess who it is?
And when he's reached the summit,
can you guess what he'll say?
He will call: "Butterfly" from the distance.
I, without answ'ring,
hold myself quietly conceal'd.
A bit to tease him and a bit so as to not die
at our first meeting; and then, a little troubled,
he will call, he will call:
"Dear baby wife of mine,
dear little orange blossom!"
The names he used to call me when he came here.

(to Suzuki)
This will all come to pass,
as I tell you.
Banish your idle fears, for he will return,
I know it.
