= Round the Outside! Round the Outside! =

Studio album by Malcolm McLaren Presents the World's Famous Supreme Team
- Released: 1990
- Genre: Eurodance; pop rap
- Label: Virgin Records
- Producer: Malcolm McLaren; Shake City Productions

Malcolm McLaren chronology
Waltz Darling (1989)	Round the Outside! Round the Outside! (1990)	Paris (1994)

The World's Famous Supreme Team chronology
Rappin' (1986)	Round the Outside! Round the Outside! (1990)

Singles from Round the Outside! Round the Outside!
- 1. "Operaa House" Released: 1990; 2. "Romeo and Juliet" Released: March 27, 1991

Professional ratings
Review scores
Source	Rating
AllMusic	3/5 stars
Entertainment Weekly	C
RapReviews	6/10

Round the Outside! Round the Outside! is a studio album by English impresario Malcolm McLaren and American hip hop group the World's Famous Supreme Team. It was released in 1990 on Virgin Records.

Sections of the track “Operaa House!” (the opera singing portions) as well as parts of the accompanying music video were repurposed into a track named “Aria on Air,” which was then used in British Airways television commercials in the early 1990s.

== Track listing ==
No.	Title	Length
1.	"Operaa House!"
2.	"World Tribe"
3.	"Diva Loves Operaa House!"
4.	"II Be or Not II Be"
5.	"Romeo and Juliet"
6.	"Whrefor Art Thou?"
7.	"Buffalo Gals II (Remix)"
8.	"World Famous Supreme Team Radio Show (Remix)"
9.	"Un Coche de Agua Negra"
10.	"Aladdin's Scratch"

== Charts ==
Chart performance for Round the Outside! Round the Outside!
Chart (1991)	Peak position
Australian Albums (ARIA)	57
Dutch Albums (Album Top 100)	62
New Zealand Albums (RMNZ)	6
