= Buffalo Gals Back to Skool =

Buffalo Gals back to Skool

Compilation album by Malcolm McLaren
- Released: September 25, 1998
- Genre: Hip hop
- Length: 69:02
- Label: Caroline/Virgin/EMI Records
- Producers: Stephen Hague, Trevor Horn, KRS-One, Malcolm McLaren, Chris "Poppa Weely" Percival, Rakim, Scars

Malcolm McLaren chronology
Paris (1994)	Buffalo Gals back to Skool (1998)	Tranquilize (2005)

Professional ratings
Review scores
Source	Rating
Allmusic	link

Buffalo Gals Back to Skool is an album by Malcolm McLaren that was released on September 25, 1998. It is based on McLaren's 1982 single "Buffalo Gals".

== Track listing ==
1. "It Was A New York Phenomenon" (Malcolm McLaren) - 1:57
2. "Class In Session" (Da Boogie Man) - 2:33
3. "Buffalo Gals (Back To Skool)" (Remix) (Rakim) - 4:22
4. "Bring It Back" (Soulson) - 4:49
5. "Zulu Nation Party" (Malcolm McLaren) - 2:43
6. "Off The Top" (Live) (Hannibal Lechter) - 6:17
7. "Bow Wow Wow Show (Live) (Malcolm McLaren) - 1:34
8. "World Famous Supreme Team Show WHBI" (Link) (The World Famous Supreme Team Radio Show) - 0:36
9. "Buffalo Gals" (Original Version; (DJ Cut; Special Stereo Mix) (Malcolm McLaren) - 3:46
10. "Let It Flow (Do You Like Scratchin'?)" (KRS-One) - 3:57
11. "Psalms" (T'Kalla) - 1:48
12. "Hey DJ" (Original 12' Mix) (The World Famous Supreme Team) - 6:06
13. "42nd Street" (Malcolm McLaren) - 2:06
14. "World Famous Supreme Team Show WHBI" (Link) (The World Famous Supreme Team Radio Show) - 2:23
15. "Do You Like Scratchin'?" (Original) (Malcolm McLaren & The World Famous Supreme Team) - 3:45
16. "World Famous Supreme Team Show WHBI" (Link) (The World Famous Supreme Team Radio Show) - 0:24
17. "Hey DJ" (De La Soul) - 4:29
18. "She's Looking Like A Hobo" (Original Version) (Malcolm McLaren) - 3:15
19. "World Famous Supreme Team Show WHBI" (Link) (The World Famous Supreme Team Radio Show) - 0:23
20. "World Famous" (Original Version) (The World Famous Supreme Team) - 2:26
21. "Shout Outs" (Forrest Getemgump and Burn One) - 1:36
22. "Buffalo Gals (Back To Skool, Part 2)" (Soulson) - 3:54
23. "Building / Adding On" (The World Famous Supreme Team) - 4:00

== Personnel ==
Musicians and performers

- Malcolm McLaren – lead vocals, horn
- Henri Scars Struck - All instruments programming
- World's Famous Supreme Team
- Rakim – lead vocals
- De La Soul
- KRS one
- Chris "Poppa Weely" Percival – lead vocals
- Soulson – lead vocals and backing vocals
- Stevie Blass – keyboards, backing vocals
- Shelly Jefferson – backing vocals
- Courtney Terry – backing vocals

Editing, mixing, and remixing

- Sean Coffey
- David Jude Jolicoeur
- Native Son
- Yianni Papadopoulos
- Henri Scars Struck

Engineering

- Sean Coffey
- Matt Hathaway
- Andy Katz
- Paul Oliviera
- Henri Scars Struck

Photography

- Bob Gruen
- Michael Halsband
- Bruce Stansbury

Producers

- Stephen Hague
- Trevor Horn
- KRS-One
- Malcolm McLaren
- Rakim
- Henri Scars Struck
