= Swamp Thing (album) =

Studio album by Malcolm McLaren
- Released: 11 November 1985
- Recorded: 1982–1984
- Genre: Dance music
- Length: 37:31
- Labels: (United Kingdom) Charisma CAS 1170 (United States) Island/Atlantic; 90481
- Producers: Malcolm McLaren, Stephen Hague, Trevor Horn

Malcolm McLaren chronology
Fans (1984)	Swamp Thing (1985)	Waltz Darling (1989)

Singles from Swamp Thing
- 1. "Duck Rock Cheer" b/w "Boys Chorus (La Sui Monti Dell'est)" Released: 1985

Professional ratings
Review scores
Source	Rating
AllMusic	1/5 stars
The Encyclopedia of Popular Music	1/5 stars
MusicHound Rock: The Essential Album Guide	2/5 stars
The Rolling Stone Album Guide	1.5/5 stars

Swamp Thing is the third album by Malcolm McLaren, released in 1985. It is composed of out-takes recorded between 1982 and 1984. The tracks were often built upon material previously recorded – for example, "Eiffel Tower" repurposed lyrics from the Bow Wow Wow song "Sexy Eiffel Towers" with the rhythm track of "Punk it Up" from McLaren's album Duck Rock, while another track from that album, "Soweto," found its instrumental hook reused in the track "Boom Boom Baby." The album was never released on CD.

The album was released to fulfill a contractual obligation with his record label. "Duck Rock Cheer" was the sole single released to promote the album. Neither the album nor the single met with commercial or critical success, though "Eiffel Tower" had earlier been featured on the soundtrack of the 1984 Jerry Schatzberg film No Small Affair.

== Critical reception ==
NME wrote that the album "plays listlessly end to end," and but that there are "four goodies out of eight." Trouser Press wrote that "the title track perverts 'Wild Thing' into a nightmarish but enjoyable mess." The Rolling Stone Album Guide called Swamp Thing "a hellishly self-referential mess."

== Track listing ==
Side one
No.	Title	Writer(s)	Length
1.	"Swamp Thing"	McLaren	6:17
2.	"Duck Rock Cheer"	Trevor Horn, McLaren	7:12
3.	"Buffalo Love"	Anne Dudley, McLaren	4:00
4.	"Supresto"	McLaren	1:12

Side two
No.	Title	Writer(s)	Length
5.	"B.I. Bikki"	Stephen Hague, McLaren	3:42
6.	"Eiffel Tower"	McLaren	3:46
7.	"Boom Boom Baby"	McLaren	4:45
8.	"Duck Rockers/Promises"	Trevor Horn, McLaren	5:56

== Personnel ==
- Stephen Hague - Production (tracks 2 and 5)
- Trevor Horn - Production (tracks 2 and 8)
- Malcolm McLaren - Production (all tracks except 2 and 5)
- Nick Egan - Cover Design
- Michael Halsband - Photography
- Bob Gruen - Background Photography
