= Sonia Rykiel =

French fashion designer and writer (1930 - 2016)

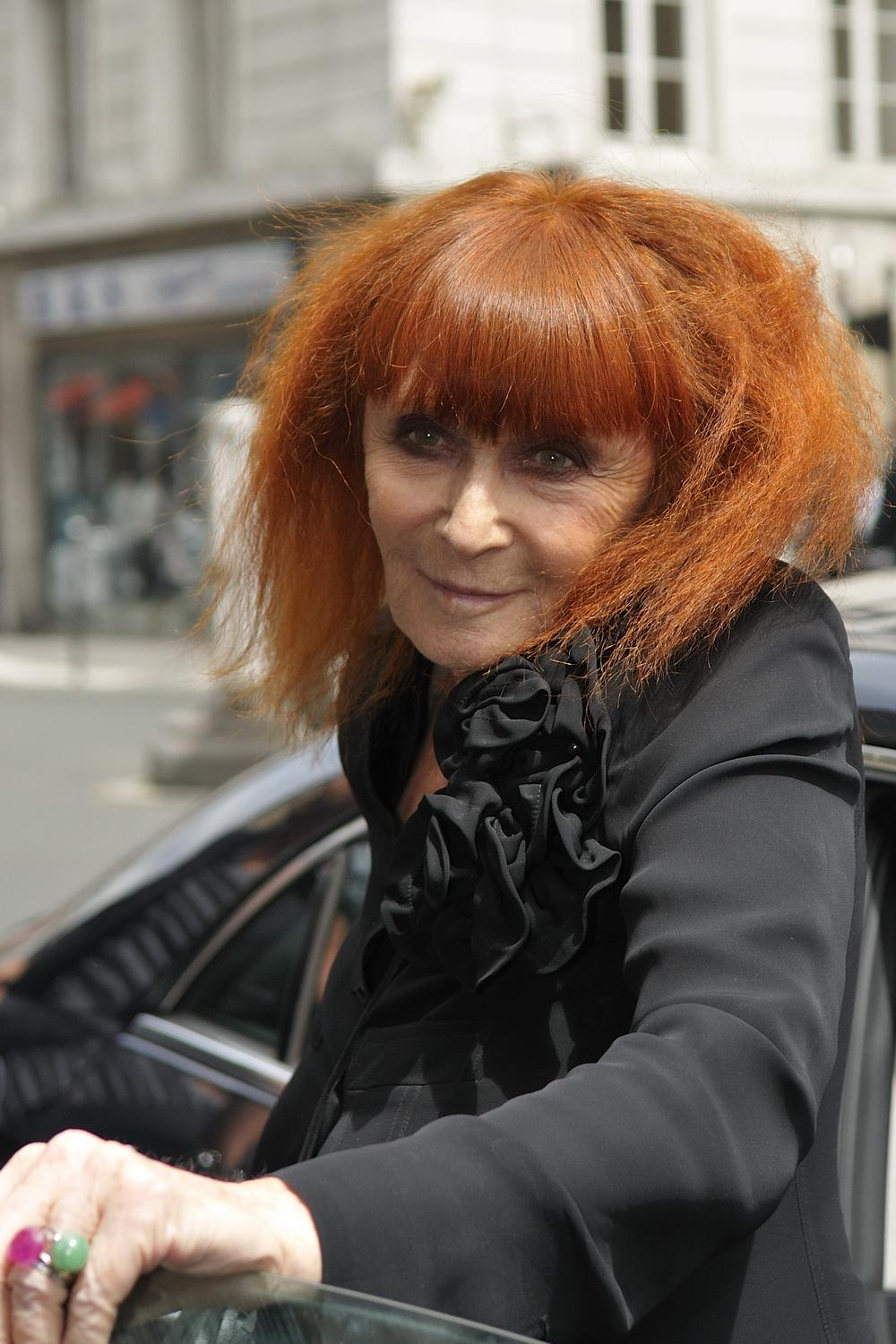
- Rykiel in 2009
- Born: Sonia Flis; 25 May 1930; Neuilly-sur-Seine, France
- Died: 25 August 2016 (aged 86); Paris, France
- Occupations: Fashion designer, writer
- Spouse: Sam Rykiel (m. 1953–1968)
- Children: Nathalie Rykiel; Jean-Philippe Rykiel

Sonia Rykiel (née Flis; French pronunciation: [sɔn.ja ʁi.kjɛl]; 25 May 1930 – 25 August 2016) was a French fashion designer and writer. She created the Poor Boy Sweater, which was featured on the cover of French Elle magazine. Her knitwear designs and new fashion techniques led her to be dubbed the "Queen of Knits". The Sonia Rykiel label was founded in 1968, upon the opening of her first store, making clothing, accessories, and fragrances. Rykiel was also a writer, and her first book was published in 1979. In 2012, Rykiel revealed that she was suffering from Parkinson's disease. She died from complications of the disease on 25 August 2016.

== Early and personal life ==
Sonia Flis was born to Jewish parents in Neuilly-sur-Seine on 25 May 1930. Her mother was from Poland, and her father was a watchmaker from Romania. She was the eldest of five sisters. In 1948, at the age of 17, she was employed to dress the window displays in a Parisian textile store, the Grande Maison de Blanc.

In 1953, Sonia married Sam Rykiel, owner of Laura, a boutique selling elegant clothing. The couple had two children, Nathalie and Jean-Philippe Rykiel. They divorced in 1968.

Rykiel often wore her clothes from her own label and stuck to wearing dark green, brown, navy, and black garments. Of her style, Rykiel said, "I hate wasting time getting dressed. I like to put something on and just think: 'Yes. That's it.' When I'm tired I like to dress very simply – perhaps a black crêpe jacket and black crêpe trousers." Rykiel was also known for her distinctive hairstyle – red hair cut into a bob with a heavy fringe.

In 2009, Rykiel signed a petition in support of film director Roman Polanski, calling for his release after Polanski was arrested in Switzerland in relation to his 1977 charge for drugging and raping a 13-year-old girl.

== Fashion ==
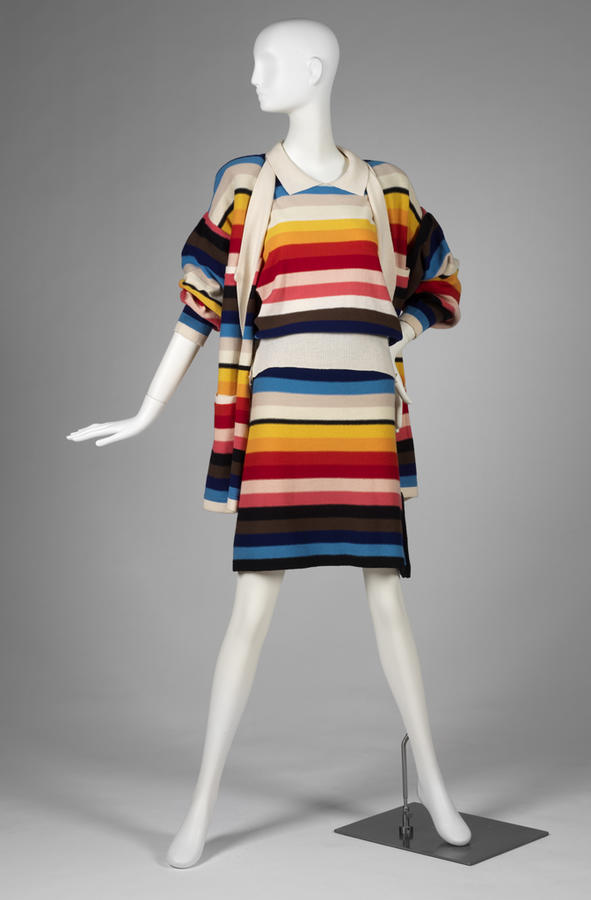
Knitted ensemble by Sonia Rykiel, Spring-Summer 1986

=== Early beginnings ===
In 1962, unable to find something to wear during her pregnancy, Rykiel used an Italian clothing supplier to design and create a dress and a sweater, which incorporated high cut arm holes and a shrunken fit to cling to the body. The practical and modern style led to orders from her friends and became known as the Poor Boy Sweater. Rykiel started selling the sweaters from her husband's store and the Poor Boy Sweater made the cover of French Elle magazine, bringing Rykiel fame. Actress Audrey Hepburn bought 14 sweaters in every colour.

=== Sonia Rykiel ===
Rykiel's husband helped her to create the Sonia Rykiel Company in 1965. In 1968, Rykiel opened her first boutique store on the Left Bank.

Rykiel invented various fashion techniques. She was the first designer to put seams on the outside of a garment, leave hems unfinished and use slogans on her sweaters. She has also been credited with popularisation of wearing black. In 1972, Rykiel was dubbed "Queen of Knits" by Women's Wear Daily. She was also known as "Coco Rykiel", a comparison to Coco Chanel. In 1977, she became the first designer to create a line of clothes for mail order firm 3 Suisses. The following year, she launched her first fragrance called Septième sens (Seventh Sense).

By the early 1990s, the Sonia Rykiel company had grown into a $75 million business, with two women's wear lines, men's wear, children's wear, accessories and perfume, and was sold by 250 retailers in 40 countries.

Nathalie Rykiel was appointed president of Sonia Rykiel in 2007. In October 2008, at a fashion show celebrating the brand's 40th anniversary, tributes were paid to Rykiel. Thirty fashion designers, including Ralph Lauren, Jean-Paul Gaultier and Giorgio Armani, showcased their visions of the "Rykiel woman". In December 2009, Rykiel and H&M introduced "Sonia Rykiel pour H&M", two masstige operations with the Swedish retailer. An event was held at the Grand Palais in Paris to celebrate the collection.

In January 2012 the Sonia Rykiel company became majority-owned by the Hong Kong-based First Heritage Brands, part of the investment company Fung Brands. Fung Brands acquired 80 percent of Sonia Rykiel, with the Rykiel family retaining a 20 percent stake as well as the company's real estate.

That same year, Canadian designer Geraldo da Conceição succeeded April Crichton as the artistic director of Rykiel. Julie de Libran took over the role during the following year.

In 2016, Nathalie Rykiel sold the family's remaining 20 percent stake to First Heritage Brands and relinquished her board seat, though the family kept the real estate. Shortly after, the company implemented a major restructuring plan that included closing the Sonia by Sonia Rykiel diffusion line, adding lower-price items to the main Sonia Rykiel collection, and laying off workers.

For its advertising campaigns, Sonya Rykiel has been working with photographers including Dominique Issermann (1979–1993), Mert Alas and Marcus Piggott (2013), Craig McDean (2014) Juergen Teller (2015) and Glen Luchford (2016).

In mid-2019, after years of mismanagement by First Heritage Brands, the Sonia Rykiel brand liquidated its operations, after a Paris commercial court judge rejected Lévy, the only remaining bidder for the company. In late 2019, brothers Eric and Michael Dayan bought the Sonia Rykiel company for a reported sum of 10 million euros. G-III Apparel Group acquired the brand in 2021

== Other activities ==
=== Writing ===
Rykiel was also a writer. She wrote several books about fashion, a collection of children's stories, magazine columns and an epistolary novel with Régine Deforges. Her first book Et Je La Voudrais Nue (I Would Like Her Naked) was published in 1979. In 2012, she co-authored N'oubliez pas que je joue (Don't forget it's a game) with journalist Judith Perrignon.

=== Interior design ===
Rykiel contributed to the interior decoration for the Hôtel de Crillon (1985) and the Hôtel Lutetia.

=== Music and film ===
Rykiel collaborated with impresario and performer Malcolm McLaren on the song "Who the Hell is Sonia Rykiel?" on McLaren's 1995 album Paris.

Rykiel makes a cameo appearance in Robert Altman's 1994 film Prêt-à-Porter. Altman was inspired to make the film after attending one of Rykiel's ready-to-wear fashion shows. The lead character, played by actress Anouk Aimée, was based on the designer. Rykiel appeared as Hortense in the 1998 French comedy film Riches, belles, etc..

=== Costume design ===
Rykiel designed and created the costumes for the French musical comedy Les Dix Commandements in 2000.

== Death ==
Rykiel died at her home in Paris during the morning of 25 August 2016, aged 86. Her death was caused by complications from Parkinson's disease. Rykiel revealed in 2012 that she had been suffering from the disease for fifteen years. She is survived by her children Nathalie and Jean-Philippe Rykiel. President François Hollande called Rykiel "a pioneer", while Jean-Marc Loubier stated "It is a sad day but Sonia Rykiel leaves behind her an extraordinary legacy."

== Exhibitions ==
The Sonia Rykiel brand and its designs were the subject of an exhibition at the Musée des Arts Décoratifs, Paris from 20 November 2008 to 20 April 2009, curated by Olivier Saillard.

== Honours ==
- Oscar from Fashion Group International of New York (1986)
- Officer of the Ordre des Arts et des Lettres (1993)
- Award for Design Excellence from the Chicago Historical Society's Costume Committee (1994).
- Officer of l'Ordre National de la Légion d'Honneur (1996)
- Trophée Whirlpool des Femmes in Gold entrepreneurial award (1997)
- Commander of the National Order of Merit (2001)
- Woman of the Year from the Association des Amis du Musée de Tel-Aviv (2002)
- Promoted to Commander of l'ordre national de la Légion d'Honneur (2008)
- Grande Médaille de Vermeil de la Ville de Paris
- Promoted to Commander of l'Ordre des Arts et des Lettres for her contribution to arts and literature (2012)
- Promoted to Grand Officer of the National Order of Merit (2013)
- A street in Paris was named after Sonia Rykiel in September 2018.
