= Waltz Darling =

Studio album by Malcolm McLaren and The Bootzilla Orchestra
- Released: 3 July 1989
- Recorded: Abbey Road Studios, London; Pearl Sound, Detroit; The Hit Factory, New York
- Genre: Dance music
- Length: 36:23
- Label: Epic
- Producers: Malcolm McLaren; "Bootsy" Collins; Phil Ramone; Andy Richards; Maz Kessler; Robby Kilgore; David LeBolt; David A. Stewart

Malcolm McLaren and The Bootzilla Orchestra chronology
Swamp Thing (1985)	Waltz Darling (1989)	Round the Outside! Round the Outside! (1990)

Singles from Waltz Darling
- 1. "Waltz Darling" Released: May 1989; 2. "Something's Jumpin' in Your Shirt" Released: August 1989; 3. "Deep in Vogue" Released: May 1989; 4. "House of the Blue Danube" Released: November 1989; 5. "Call a Wave" Released: 1990

Professional ratings
Review scores
Source	Rating
AllMusic	link
Robert Christgau	B link

Waltz Darling is the fourth studio album by Malcolm McLaren (his only with The Bootzilla Orchestra), released in 1989. The album spawned several popular singles, including "Deep in Vogue", a collaboration with Willi Ninja, best known for his appearance in the documentary film Paris Is Burning, which introduced "voguing" to the mainstream. Another single, "House of the Blue Danube", was used in the trailer for the 1990 film Teenage Mutant Ninja Turtles.

Four singles from the album reached the UK Singles Chart: "Waltz Darling" (#31), "Something's Jumpin' in Your Shirt" (#29), "House of the Blue Danube" (#73) and "Deep in Vogue" (#83).

Malcolm personally hired conceptual artist JJ Carver (AKA James Carver), formerly Creative Director of The Leisure Process, to art direct the album sleeve and singles covers. Malcolm and James were introduced by mutual friend Tommy Roberts at The Titanic night club in Berkeley Square. The album cover shows Frederic Leighton's painting Flaming June.

== Track listing ==
Side one
No.	Title	Writer(s)	Length
1.	"House of the Blue Danube (An Instrumental)" (Featuring Bootsy Collins and Jeff Beck)	Malcolm McLaren	4:54
2.	"Something's Jumpin' in Your Shirt" (Featuring Lisa Marie)	Maz Kessler, Robby Kilgore, Malcolm McLaren	4:51
3.	"Waltz Darling" (Introducing Lourdes and Pretty Fatt)	David LeBolt, Malcolm McLaren	4:27
4.	"Shall We Dance"	Malcolm McLaren	4:40

Side two
No.	Title	Writer(s)	Length
5.	"Deep in Vogue" (Introducing Lourdes and Willie Ninja)	David LeBolt, Malcolm McLaren	4:02
6.	"Call a Wave" (Featuring Jeff Beck and Introducing Gina Cie)	Malcolm McLaren	4:14
7.	"Algernon's Simply Awfully Good at Algebra" (Introducing Miss Ndea)	Malcolm McLaren, Dave A. Stewart	4:01
8.	"I Like You in Velvet"	Maz Kessler, Robby Kilgore, Malcolm McLaren	5:17

== Personnel ==
- "Bootsy" Collins – production (tracks 2, 4 and 8)
- Maz Kessler – production (tracks 2 and 8)
- Robby Kilgore – production (tracks 2 and 8)
- David LeBolt – production (tracks 3 and 5)
- Malcolm McLaren – production
- Phil Ramone – production
- Andy Richards – production (track 1)
- David A. Stewart – production (track 7)
- Mark Moore and William Orbit – additional production and remix (track 5)
- Ben Grosse – recording (Detroit)
- Andy Richards – recording (London)
- Lord Frederick Leighton – front cover painting: Flaming June
- The Leisure Process – sleeve design
- Jay Healy – mixing
- Kevin Davies – photography
- Robin Derrick – photography

== Charts ==
Chart performance for Waltz Darling
Chart (1989)	Peak position
Australian Albums (ARIA)	60
Canada Top Albums/CDs (RPM)	91
Dutch Albums (Album Top 100)	41
German Albums (Offizielle Top 100)	39
New Zealand Albums (RMNZ)	7
Swedish Albums (Sverigetopplistan)	47
UK Albums (OCC)	30

== See also ==
- "Ta-ra-ra Boom-de-ay", used for lyrics to the song "Waltz Darling"
