= Madam Butterfly (song) =

1984 single by Malcolm McLaren

"Madam Butterfly (Un bel dì vedremo)"

Single by Malcolm McLaren

from the album Fans
- B-side: "First Couple Out"
- Released: 20 August 1984
- Genre: Electronic R&B
- Length: 6:32
- Label: Virgin; Charisma
- Songwriters: Malcolm McLaren; Stephen Hague; Walter Turbitt
- Composer: Giacomo Puccini
- Producers: Stephen Hague; Walter Turbitt

Malcolm McLaren singles chronology
"Double Dutch" (1983)	"Madam Butterfly (Un bel dì vedremo)" (1984)	"Carmen" (1984)

"Madam Butterfly (Un bel dì vedremo)" is a song by English musician Malcolm McLaren, an electronic interpretation of the aria "Un bel dì vedremo" from Giacomo Puccini's opera Madama Butterfly. It was released as a single from McLaren's second studio album, Fans (1984), and reached number 13 on the UK Singles Chart and number 19 on the US Hot Dance/Disco chart.

The song was produced by Stephen Hague, and is cited by the Pet Shop Boys as the reason they chose Hague to rework the original 1984 Bobby Orlando version of "West End Girls" into a more cinematic version before later going on to produce their debut album Please.

== Track listings ==
- 7-inch single

A. "Madam Butterfly (Un bel dì vedremo)" – 6:30
B. "First Couple Out" – 3:18

- 12-inch single

A. "Madam Butterfly (Un bel dì vedremo)" – 6:30
B. "First Couple Out" (extended mix) – 7:20

- US 7-inch single

A. "Madam Butterfly" – 3:58
B. "Boys' Chorus" – 4:30

- US 12-inch single

A. "Madam Butterfly" (Aria from the Opera Madam Butterfly) – 6:20
B. "Madam Butterfly" (On the Fly mix) – 10:05

== Charts ==
Chart performance for "Madam Butterfly"
Chart (1984)	Peak position
Australia (Kent Music Report)	16
Belgium (Ultratop 50 Flanders)	29
Europe (European Top 100 Singles)	38
Europe (European Airplay Top 50)	23
Ireland (IRMA)	10
Netherlands (Dutch Top 40)	16
Netherlands (Single Top 100)	19
New Zealand (Recorded Music NZ)	48
UK Singles (Official Charts)	13
US Hot Dance/Disco (Billboard)	19
West Germany (GfK)	36
