= Fans (album) =

Studio album by Malcolm McLaren
- Released: December 1984
- Recorded: 1984
- Studios: Syncro Studio, Boston; Unique Studios and The Hit Factory, New York City
- Genres: Dance; R&B; opera
- Length: 30:05
- Labels: Charisma Records (UK); MMLP 2 Island/Atco/Atlantic Records (US); 91242
- Producers: Robby Kilgore; Stephen Hague; Malcolm McLaren

Malcolm McLaren chronology
Duck Rock (1983)	Fans (1984)	Swamp Thing (1985)

Singles from Fans
- 1. "Madam Butterfly (Un bel dì vedremo)" Released: 20 August 1984; 2. "Carmen (L'Oiseau Rebelle)" Released: January 1985

Professional ratings
Review scores
Source	Rating
AllMusic	3/5 stars
Robert Christgau	B+
Rolling Stone	4/5 stars

Fans is the second studio album by Malcolm McLaren, released in 1984. It was an attempt at fusing opera with 1980s R&B and contains adaptations of pieces from famous operas such as Madama Butterfly and Carmen. The opera recordings were made at the Unitarian Church, Belmont, Massachusetts by Stephen Hague and Walter Turbitt.

== Singles ==
Two singles were released from the album: "Madame Butterfly (un bel dì vedremo)" peaked at number 13 in the UK Singles Chart and "Carmen (L'Oiseau Rebelle)" reached number 79.

== Track listing ==
Side one
No.	Title	Writer(s)	Length
1.	"Madam Butterfly (Un bel dì vedremo)" (from Puccini's opera Madama Butterfly)	Malcolm McLaren; Stephen Hague; Walter Turbitt	6:32
2.	"Fans (Nessun dorma)" (from Puccini's opera Turandot)	McLaren; Robbie Kilgore	3:50
3.	"Carmen (L'Oiseau Rebelle)" (from Bizet's opera Carmen)	McLaren; Kilgore; Hague; Turbitt	4:55

Side two
No.	Title	Writer(s)	Length
4.	"Boys Chorus (Là Sui Monti Dell'Est)" (from Puccini's opera Turandot)	McLaren; Kilgore	4:30
5.	"Lauretta (O mio babbino caro)" (from Puccini's opera Gianni Schicchi)	McLaren; Kilgore	5:20
6.	"Death of Butterfly (Tu Tu Piccolo)" (from Puccini's opera Madama Butterfly)	McLaren; Kilgore	4:58

== More tracks ==
1. "Madam Butterfly (On-The-Fly Mix)"
2. "Madam Butterfly (Ocean Mix)"
3. "Carmen (Instrumental Remix)"
4. "Death of Butterfly (Instrumental)"

== Personnel ==
- Timothy McFarland – conductor and operatic coordinator
- Malcolm McLaren – production
- Robbie Kilgore – production
- Mike Finleyson – engineering
- Tom Lord-Alge – engineering
- Jeff Neiblum – assistant engineering
- John Davenport – associate engineering
- Bradshaw Leigh – mixing
- Nick Egan – cover design
- Robert Erdman – photography
- Bob Green – "Butterfly Ball" photography

"Madam Butterfly"

- Soprano – Betty Ann White
- Voice (Cho-Cho San) – Debbie Cole
- Voice (Pinkerton) – Malcolm McLaren
- Backing vocals – Diane Garisto, Sheila Pate
- Instruments – Hague, Turbitt
- Production and engineering – Stephen Hague, Walter Turbitt
- Remix – Bradshaw Leigh, Robby Kilgore
- Instruments – Robbie Kilgore

"Fans"

- Lead vocals – Angie B.
- Tenor – Michael Austin
- Voice (Dresser) – Malcolm McLaren
- Piano – Timothy McFarland
- Instruments – Robbie Kilgore

"Carmen"

- Soprano – Valerie Walters
- Voice (Carmen) – Angie B.
- Voice (Don Jose) – Malcolm McLaren
- Additional guitar – Jimi Tunnell
- Classical guitar – Craig Bihari
- Instruments – Robbie Kilgore

"Boys Chorus"

- Additional guitar – Jimi Tunnell
- Vocals – Malcolm McLaren and The Boston Choir
- Instruments – Robbie Kilgore

"Lauretta"

- Soprano – Betty Ann White
- Voice (Lauretta) – Diane Garisto
- Voice (Ricky) – Malcolm McLaren
- Engineered basic tracks – Walter Turbitt
- Mixing of basic tracks – Bradshaw Leigh
- Instruments – Robbie Kilgore

"Death of Butterfly"

- Soprano – Betty Ann White
- Voice (Pinkerton) – Malcolm McLaren
- Instruments – Robbie Kilgore

== Charts ==
Chart (1984)	Peak position
Canada Top Albums/CDs (RPM)	24
Dutch Albums (Album Top 100)	43
New Zealand Albums (RMNZ)	29
UK Albums (Official Charts)	47
US Billboard 200	190
Chart (2010)	Peak position
UK Dance Albums (Official Charts)	37
