= Buffalo Gals (Malcolm McLaren song) =

1982 single by Malcolm McLaren

Single by Malcolm McLaren and the World's Famous Supreme Team

from the album Duck Rock
- Released: 19 November 1982
- Genre: Hip hop, new wave, dance-rock
- Length: 3:40
- Label: Charisma (UK); Island/Atco/Atlantic (US)
- Songwriters: Anne Dudley; Trevor Horn; Malcolm McLaren
- Producers: Trevor Horn; Malcolm McLaren

Malcolm McLaren singles chronology
"Buffalo Gals" (1982)	"Soweto" (1983)

"Buffalo Gals" is a 1982 hip hop single released by Malcolm McLaren and the World's Famous Supreme Team, which was later included on McLaren's 1983 album Duck Rock. The song is composed of extensive scratching with calls from square dancing. The music video prominently features the Rock Steady Crew and was filmed all around the city of NYC.

== History ==
While in New York City looking for a support act for Bow Wow Wow, McLaren got the idea for the song when he went to an outdoor concert (known as a "Block Party") by Afrika Bambaataa and Universal Zulu Nation. This is where he was exposed to hip-hop for the first time and discovered the scratching technique he would use on this song. Most of the scratching and the beat of the song were composed by Trevor Horn.

Charisma Records were not initially keen on releasing the song, but relented after a strong positive response to the first broadcast of the track by DJ Kid Jensen.

=== Recording ===
In the liner notes for Duck Rock, McLaren wrote that this track was "recorded with the World's Famous Supreme Team and Zulu singers backing them up with the words 'she's looking like a hobo.' The performance by the Supreme Team may require some explaining, but suffice to say they are DJs from New York City who have developed a technique using record players like instruments, replacing the power chord of the guitar with the needle of a gramophone, moving it manually backwards and forwards across the surface of a record. We call it scratching."

Trevor Horn recalled the recording: "By the time Malcolm McLaren arrived, I'd got a Fairlight ... By the time I did McLaren I'd bought an Oberheim sequencer and drum machine, a DMX and a DSX. I told the World's Famous Supreme Team to tell me their favourite drum beat. It took a couple of hours for them to actually communicate it to me, but once I'd got it, that was 'Buffalo Girls': 'du du — cha — du du — cha'. That was done on this DMX and DSX and they just scratched on top of that."

== Re-release ==
McLaren and the World's Famous Supreme Team released a record based on the song that includes several remixes, released on 25 September 1998 by Virgin Records, titled "Buffalo Gals Back to Skool". The record includes KRS-One, Rakim, Henri Scars Struck and Stephen Hague, among others.

== Charts ==
Chart performance for "Buffalo Gals"
Chart (1982–1983)	Peak position
Australia (Kent Music Report)	19
Austria (Ö3 Austria Top 40)	19
Belgium (Ultratop 50 Flanders)	16
Germany (GfK)	20
Ireland (IRMA)	16
New Zealand (Recorded Music NZ)	3
Sweden (Sverigetopplistan)	13
Switzerland (Schweizer Hitparade)	9
UK Singles (Official Charts)	9
US Hot Dance Club Play	33
