= Paris (Malcolm McLaren album) =

Studio album by Malcolm McLaren
- Released: 1994
- Length: 108:28
- Label: Gee Street/Island/PolyGram Records
- Producer: Robin Millar

Malcolm McLaren chronology
Round the Outside, Round the Outside (1990)	Paris (1994)	Buffalo Gals Back to Skool (1998)

Paris is a double album by English artist Malcolm McLaren, released in 1994. A video, shot by David Bailey, was produced for "Paris Paris".

== Production ==
The album was recorded in France over the course of a year, in an attic, with equipment purchased in England at discounted prices. Catherine Deneuve agreed to sing on Paris Paris after telling McLaren that she had his lyrics rewritten. McLaren claimed that all of his vocals were first takes. "Miles and Miles of Miles Davis" is about Miles Davis's relationship with Juliette Gréco. Françoise Hardy sang on "Revenge of the Flowers".

== Critical reception ==
Professional ratings
Review scores
Source	Rating
AllMusic	2/5 stars
Calgary Herald	D
Knoxville News Sentinel	4/5 stars
The Village Voice	C

The Toronto Star wrote: "Whether this is a weird travelogue, faux continental sophistication or the real thing, the grand swindler McLaren serves up a rakish and compelling listen." The Calgary Herald deemed the album "nothing more than a cliched celebration of Paris, songs steeped in marshmallow romance, postcard sentimentality, cheesy dance rhythms, pseudo-jazz."

== Track listing ==
=== Disc one ===
1. "Mon Dié Sénié" – 4:30
2. "Walking with Satie" – 4:03
3. "Père Lachaise" – 3:41
4. "Miles and Miles of Miles Davis" – 2:04
5. "Jazz Is Paris" – 5:15
6. "Rue Dauphine" – 3:26
7. "Paris Paris" (with Catherine Deneuve) – 5:24
8. "Je T'Aime... Moi Non Plus" – 4:39
9. "Club le Narcisse" – 3:20
10. "La Main Parisienne" (with Amina Annabi) – 5:02
11. "Driving into Delirium" – 2:33
12. "Revenge of the Flowers" (with Françoise Hardy) – 4:05
13. "In the Absence of the Parisienne" – 4:27
14. "Anthem" – 3:50
15. "Who the Hell Is Sonia Rykiel?" – 6:18

=== Disc two: The Largest Movie House in Paris (The Ambient Remixes) ===
Professional ratings
Review scores
Source	Rating
Muzik	1/5 stars

1. "Paris Un" – 4:39
2. "Paris Deux" – 4:02
3. "Paris Trois" – 9:43
4. "Paris Quatre" – 3:35
5. "Paris Cinq" – 3:38
6. "Paris Six" – 4:26
7. "Paris Sept" – 6:20
8. "Paris Huit" – 4:11
9. "Paris Lutece Paname" – 5:17

== Japanese release ==
The Japanese release was a single disc with a different track list that omitted "Je T'aime... Moi Non Plus" and included "Paris Un" (from disc 2 of the standard release). "Miles and Miles of Miles Davis" was renamed "Miles and Miles of Miles". A duet with Sonia Rykiel, was renamed "Je M'Appelle Malcolm McLaren, et Vous? Sonia Rykiel".

== Track listing ==
1. "Mon Dié Sénié"
2. "Walking with Satie"
3. "Père Lachaise"
4. "Miles and Miles of Miles"
5. "Jazz Is Paris"
6. "Rue Dauphine"
7. "Paris Paris"
8. "Club le Narcisse"
9. "La Main Parisienne"
10. "Driving into Delirium"
11. "Revenge of the Flowers"
12. "In the Absence of the Parisienne"
13. "Anthem"
14. "Paris Un"
15. "Je M'Apelle Malcolm McLaren, et vous? Sonia Rykiel"

== UK release ==
The UK release was a single disc with a different track list that omitted "Je T'Aime... Moi Non Plus" and the duet with Sonia Rykiel. "Miles and Miles of Miles Davis" was renamed "Miles and Miles of Miles".

== Track listing ==
1. "Mon Dié Sénié"
2. "Walking with Satie"
3. "Père Lachaise"
4. "Miles and Miles of Miles"
5. "Jazz Is Paris"
6. "Rue Dauphine"
7. "Paris Paris"
8. "Club le Narcisse"
9. "La Main Parisienne"
10. "Driving into Delirium"
11. "Revenge of the Flowers"
12. "In the Absence of the Parisienne"
13. "Anthem"

== Certifications ==
Region	Certification	Certified units/sales
Poland (ZPAV)	Gold	50,000^{*}
^{*} Sales figures based on certification alone.
