= Duck Rock =

Studio album by Malcolm McLaren
- Released: 27 May 1983
- Recorded: 1982
- Genre: World music, hip hop, novelty
- Length: 43:36
- Label: Charisma; Island/Atco/Atlantic
- Producer: Trevor Horn, Malcolm McLaren

Malcolm McLaren chronology
Duck Rock (1983)	Fans (1985)

Singles from Duck Rock
- 1. "Buffalo Gals" Released: 19 November 1982; 2. "Soweto" Released: 21 February 1983; 3. "Double Dutch" Released: 24 June 1983; 4. "Duck for the Oyster" Released: December 1983

Duck Rock is an album released by British impresario Malcolm McLaren. It was originally issued in 1983 by Charisma Records, Virgin Records, and Chrysalis Records, and later re-released on CD in 1987. The album mixes up styles from South Africa, Central and South America, the Caribbean, and the United States, including hip hop. The album proved to be highly influential in bringing hip hop to a wider audience in the United Kingdom. Two of the singles from the album, "Buffalo Gals" and "Double Dutch", became major chart hits on both sides of the Atlantic. Duck Rock was dedicated to Harry McClintock, better known as Haywire Mac. The album artwork was designed by Dondi White and Nick Egan, with the illustration by Keith Haring.

Guest musicians featured on this album include Trevor Horn, Anne Dudley, J. J. Jeczalik, and Thomas Dolby. Side recordings that Horn, Dudley and Jeczalik made in between takes of Duck Rock would eventually become the first album of the Art of Noise, Into Battle with the Art of Noise. Clips of the World's Famous Supreme Team radio show appear between songs, which made the album one of the earliest recordings on which members of the Nation of Gods and Earths appear.

After being out of print for a long period of time, the UK label The state51 Conspiracy released a 40th Anniversary edition of Duck Rock as an LP with an extra 12" single of outtakes, B-sides and related songs in 2023. The packaging includes elements from an aborted 25th Anniversary edition McLaren intended to release in 2008.

== Reception ==
Professional ratings
Review scores
Source	Rating
AllMusic	4.5/5 stars
RapReviews	8/10
The Village Voice	B+

In a contemporary review of the album, The Village Voice's Robert Christgau found that "McLaren knows how to record African music for Western ears, and the ebullient tunes he's collected here more than make up for his annoyance quotient", but also criticised McLaren and Horn for failing to give credit to the South African musicians involved in the recording, such as Mahlathini and the Mahotella Queens. The mbaqanga group the Boyoyo Boys took legal action against McLaren over the similarity of "Double Dutch" with its own hit "Puleng". After a lengthy legal battle in the UK, the matter was settled out of court, with payment made to the South African copyright holders, songwriter Petrus Maneli and publisher Gallo Music, but Horn and McLaren retained their songwriting credits.

Duck Rock was ranked at number nine among the "Albums of the Year" for 1983 by NME. The album garnered accolades from other publications in the years following its release. William Ruhlmann of AllMusic retrospectively reviewed it as "an amazingly eclectic collection of world music mixed with urban hip-hop". In 2013, NME ranked Duck Rock at number 298 on its list of the 500 greatest albums of all time. In 2018, Pitchfork ranked Duck Rock at number 200 on its list of the 200 best albums of the 1980s. The album also received BBC Two's Critical Music label.

== Track listing ==
Side one
No.	Title	Writer(s)	Length
1.	"Obatala"	Horn, McLaren	4:17
2.	"Buffalo Gals"	Dudley, Horn, McLaren	4:22
3.	"Double Dutch"	Horn, McLaren	5:53
4.	"Merengue"	Horn, McLaren	3:52
5.	"Punk It Up"	Horn, McLaren	4:11

Side two
No.	Title	Writer(s)	Length
6.	"Legba"	Horn, McLaren	4:03
7.	"Jive My Baby"	Horn, McLaren	5:35
8.	"Song for Chango"	Horn, McLaren	2:49
9.	"Soweto"	Horn, McLaren	3:53
10.	"World's Famous"	Dudley, McLaren	1:41
11.	"Duck for the Oyster"	Horn, McLaren	2:57

40th Anniversary Edition bonus 12" single

Side one
No.	Title	Writer(s)	Length
1.	"Collaguas"	Horn, McLaren
2.	"Roly Poly"	Horn, McLaren
3.	"Hey DJ (7" Version)" (The World Famous Supreme Team's debut single, released in 1984.)	Ronald Larkins Jr., Larry Price, McLaren, Stephen Hague

Side two
No.	Title	Writer(s)	Length
4.	"Zulu’s on a Time Bomb"	Horn, McLaren
5.	"D’Ya Like Scratchin’ (Special Version)"	Horn, Dudley, McLaren
6.	"Franz Buffalo" (A mashup of "Buffalo Gals" and Franz Ferdinand's "Take Me Out.")	Dudley, Horn, McLaren, Alex Kapranos, Nick McCarthy

== More tracks ==
1. "Buffalo Gals – Special Stereo Scratch Mix" (Horn, Dudley, McLaren)
2. "She's Looking Like a Hobo" (Horn, McLaren)
3. "Double Dutch – New Dance Mix" (Horn, McLaren)
4. "D'ya Like Scratchin'? – with the Red River Gals" (Horn, Dudley, McLaren)
5. "World's Famous – Radio ID" (Horn, Dudley, McLaren)
6. "Buffalo Gals (Trad. Square)" (Horn, Dudley, McLaren)
7. "Hobo Scratch" (Horn, McLaren)
8. "Hobo Scratch (Long Edit.)" (Horn, McLaren)
9. "D'ya Like Scratchin'? - Special Version" (Horn, Dudley, McLaren)
10. "Hobo Scratch (She's looking like a Hobo)" (Horn, McLaren)
11. "Radio Show (D'Ya Like Scratchin')" (Horn, Dudley, McLaren)

== Personnel ==
Dream team

- Malcolm McLaren – figure caller, singer (known as Talcy Malcy)
- Sedivine the Mastermind – DJ, rapper (known as Divine, Se')
- Just Allah the Superstar – DJ, rapper (known as Justice, JazzyJust)

Production team

- Trevor Horn – producer, beats, mixing - (Art of Noise)
- Anne Dudley – arranger, keyboards, string arrangements - (Art of Noise)
- Gary Langan – Jew's harp, engineer - (Art of Noise)
- J.J. Jeczalik – synthesizer - (Art of Noise)

Musicians

- David Birch – guitar
- Thomas Dolby – keyboards
- Luís Jardim – percussion
- Mahlathini and the Mahotella Queens — vocals, uncredited
- Boyoyo Boys — musicians, uncredited
- The Roan Mountain Hilltoppers - musicians, uncredited
- The Mclarenettes - background singers
- The Ebbonettes - background singers
- additional musicians uncredited - bass guitar, backing vocals

Technical

- Keith Haring – illustration
- Dondi White – graffiti
- Nick Egan – cover design
- Ron West – created Ghetto Blaster for Album Cover design
- Mastered At – The Town House

Record companies

- The Fanmous Charisma Label
- Virgin
- Island records

Fashion designer

- Vivienne Westwood
- Malcolm Mclaren

Fashion stores

- Nostalgia of Mud
- World's End

Fashion collections

- Punkature (Buffalo, Hobo)

Dedication

- Dedicated to Harry K. McLintock, better known as "Haywire Mac"

== Charts ==
=== Weekly charts ===
Chart (1983–84)	Peak position
Australian Albums (Kent Music Report)	13
German Albums (Offizielle Top 100)	62
New Zealand Albums (RMNZ)	21
UK Albums (OCC)	18

=== Year-end charts ===
Chart (1983)	Position
New Zealand Albums (RMNZ)	48

== Certifications ==
Region	Certification	Certified units/sales
United Kingdom (BPI)	Silver	60,000^{^}
^{^} Shipments figures based on certification alone.
