= The World's Famous Supreme Team =

American hip hop radio show crew and recording group

- Origin: New York City, U.S.
- Genres: Hip hop
- Years active: 1979–1991
- Labels: Island, Virgin

The World's Famous Supreme Team was an American hip hop radio show duo and recording group active from 1979 to 1991. The original members were Sedivine the Mastermind (Larry Price) and Just Allah the Superstar (Ronald Larkins Jr.).

== Career ==
The group's radio show started in 1979 on WHBI-FM 105.9, broadcasting from Newark, New Jersey and primarily serving the North Jersey and New York City area. In a 2007 interview, Sedivine described the radio station as "a little rat trap, not a big station," and said the group paid WHBI between $150 and $300 for each one-hour show.

The group rose to international prominence when punk impresario Malcolm McLaren recruited Sedevine and Just Allah, and used samples of their radio show (including their use of the then-novel scratching technique) for his 1982 hip hop song "Buffalo Gals". In 1983 the group and their radio samples were featured on McLaren's full album follow-up Duck Rock. The group is credited as the first hip hop group to incorporate Five Percent teachings and slang into their music. The group released their own single in collaboration with McLaren "Hey DJ" in 1984, produced by Stephen Hague, and which would later appear on their only album, Rappin' (1986). McLaren reunited with the group for the 1990 album Round the Outside! Round the Outside!. A compilation album of the group's music, featuring recording artists KRS-One, De La Soul, and Rakim, was released in 1998 on Virgin Records.

== Discography ==
=== Albums ===
List of albums, with selected chart positions
Title	Year	Peak chart positions		
Title	Year	AUS	NLD	NZ
Would Ya Like More Scratchin (with Malcolm McLaren)	1984	—	—	—
Rappin'	1986	—	—	—
Round the Outside! Round the Outside! (with Malcolm McLaren)	1990	57	62	6
"—" denotes releases that did not chart.

=== Singles ===
Year	Title	Peak chart positions						Certifications
Year	Title	US Dance	US R&B	AUS	NLD	NZ	UK	Certifications
1982	"Buffalo Gals" (with Malcolm McLaren)	33	—	19	—	3	9	BPI: Silver
1984	"Hey! D.J."	24	15	—	—	—	52	
1984	"Radio Man"	―	69	—	—	—	—	
1990	"Operaa House – Aria on Air" (with Malcolm McLaren)	―	—	18	17	4	75	
1991	"Romeo and Juliet" (with Malcolm McLaren)	―	―	—	—	—	—	
"—" denotes releases that did not chart or were not released in that territory.
