= Malcolm McLaren =

English fashion designer and music manager (1946–2010)

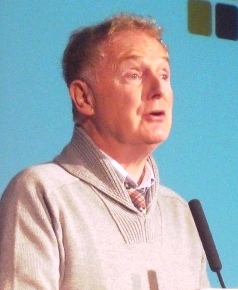
- McLaren in 2009
- Born: Malcolm Robert Andrew McLaren; 22 January 1946; Stoke Newington, London, England
- Died: 8 April 2010 (aged 64); Bellinzona, Ticino, Switzerland
- Occupations: Businessman; music manager; fashion designer; musician
- Years active: 1971–2010
- Spouse: Vivienne Westwood (m. 1967; div. 1980)
- Children: 1
- Musical career
- Genres: Rock; punk rock; hip-hop; new wave; dance
- Labels: Charisma; Island; Atlantic; Epic; SME; Gee Street; PolyGram; Virgin; EMI
- Website: malcolmmclaren.com

Malcolm Robert Andrew McLaren (22 January 1946 – 8 April 2010) was an English fashion designer, entrepreneur and music manager. He was a promoter and a manager for punk rock and new wave bands such as New York Dolls, Sex Pistols, Adam and the Ants, and Bow Wow Wow, and was an early influencer of the punk subculture.

McLaren was brought up by his grandmother after his father, Peter, left the family home. He attended several British art colleges in the 1960s, where he became involved in underground art and left-wing activism. From 1974 to 1976, he operated the Chelsea boutique Sex with his girlfriend Vivienne Westwood, which helped shape early punk fashion and became an early hub for the subculture in London. After a period advising the New York Dolls in the United States, McLaren managed the Sex Pistols, for which he recruited frontman Johnny Rotten. The issue of a controversial record, "God Save the Queen", satirizing the Queen's Jubilee in 1977, was typical of McLaren's shock tactics, and he gained publicity by being arrested after a promotional boat trip outside the Houses of Parliament.

In the 1980s, McLaren continued managing other London-based acts and performed as mainly a solo artist, initially focusing on hip-hop and world music, and later diversifying into funk, disco, and electronic dance music. When accused of turning popular culture into a cheap marketing gimmick, he replied that he hoped it was true. His first album, Duck Rock, was certified silver in the UK and spawned the top-ten singles "Buffalo Gals" and "Double Dutch".

In his later years, he lived in Paris and New York City and died of peritoneal mesothelioma in a Swiss hospital.

== Early years ==
McLaren was born on 22 January 1946 to Scottish-born engineer Peter McLaren, an upper-middle-class Londoner who was at that time serving with the Royal Engineers, and Emily Isaacs, the daughter of tailor Mick Isaacs and independently wealthy Rose Corré Isaacs.

"We've talked to Malcolm's mum. Even she doesn't like him." — Judy and Fred Vermorel, 1984

At age 16, McLaren left Orange Hill with three O-levels and was briefly employed in a handful of jobs before attending classes at St Martin's School of Art and then undertaking a foundation course at Harrow School of Art. Other arts institutions attended by McLaren over the next seven years included the South East Essex School of Art in Walthamstow and Goldsmiths.

== Fashion design and music ==
=== 430 King's Road, Vivienne Westwood and New York Dolls ===
In October 1971, McLaren took over the back part of the retail premises at 430 King's Road in Chelsea, West London, and sold rock and roll records, refurbished 1950s radiograms and deadstock clothing under the name "In the Back of Paradise Garage". With the assistance of art school friend Patrick Casey, McLaren converted the entire ground floor into the store and renamed it Let It Rock, initially selling clothing (dead stock, military surplus) and objects he had sourced. When the shop became a success, he enlisted the help of his then-girlfriend Vivienne Westwood who customized and repaired original clothing and made facsimiles.

Let It Rock was patronised by teddy boys and McLaren and Westwood's designs also appeared in such theatrical and cinematic productions as The Rocky Horror Show and That'll Be The Day. In spring 1973 the store was renamed Too Fast To Live Too Young To Die and began selling original 1950s-inspired leather clothing. Among the commissions were costumes for Ken Russell's film Mahler. In August 1973, McLaren and Westwood visited New York to participate in the National Boutique Fair, where they began an association with the New York Dolls, supplying them with stage wear and joining their group on tour in the UK and France. In October 1974, he renamed the outlet Sex to reflect its move towards fetish fashion and provocation. In January 1975, McLaren and Westwood designed red patent leather costumes for the New York Dolls and used a Soviet-style hammer and sickle motif for their stage shows in the US as an attempt to attract attention through provocation. This ploy was not successful and the Dolls soon broke up, with guitarist Johnny Thunders specifically naming McLaren as "the reason why we broke up." McLaren instead blamed Thunders and drummer Jerry Nolan's drug addictions for the split. In May 1975, McLaren returned to Britain.

=== Sex Pistols ===
From 1974, McLaren had advised Sex customers Paul Cook and Steve Jones on their musical aspirations, having proposed that one of his shop assistants, Glen Matlock, join them as the bass-player in a group McLaren named QT Jones and his Sex Pistols. In the summer of 1975, McLaren ejected frontman Wally Nightingale from the line-up because he did not fit with McLaren's vision for the band's image. His one-time associate Bernie Rhodes, who would later become the manager of the Clash, claimed he spotted a new frontman in another customer, John Lydon, then sporting green hair and torn clothes with the words "I hate" written on a Pink Floyd T-shirt above the band's name. After Lydon joined, McLaren dubbed him "Johnny Rotten" and shortened the band's name to simply Sex Pistols, stating that he wanted to give the impression of "sexy young assassins".

In May 1977, a few months after McLaren replaced Matlock with Sid Vicious (supposedly because Matlock "liked The Beatles"), the band released the anti-monarchy protest song "God Save the Queen" during the week of Queen Elizabeth II's Silver Jubilee. McLaren organised a boat trip down the Thames in which the Sex Pistols would perform their music outside the Houses of Parliament. The boat was raided by the police and McLaren was arrested, thus achieving his goal to obtain publicity.

The band released their album Never Mind the Bollocks, Here's the Sex Pistols in October 1977 and played their last UK gig before embarking upon a U.S. tour in January 1978. McLaren was accused by the band of mismanaging them and refusing to pay them when they asked him for money. McLaren stated that he had planned out the entire career path of the Sex Pistols, which he illustrated in the film The Great Rock 'n' Roll Swindle. Lydon's feelings of being used by McLaren formed the creative impetus for his subsequent band Public Image Ltd. The contractual rights to the Sex Pistols' name were disputed in a case brought by Lydon, Jones, Cook and the estate of Sid Vicious in 1979 against McLaren's management company Glitterbest. In 1986 the High Court awarded the rights to the group's name, The Great Rock 'n' Roll Swindle, the artwork, master tapes and the group's income to Lydon and the others. In the 2000 film The Filth and the Fury, the surviving members of the Sex Pistols gave their version of events. McLaren is portrayed during his time as the Sex Pistols' manager by David Hayman in the film Sid and Nancy and by Thomas Brodie-Sangster in the miniseries Pistol.

=== Other artists ===
McLaren was approached by Adam Ant to manage Adam and the Ants following their debut album release in late 1979. Shortly thereafter, three members of the band left to form Bow Wow Wow under McLaren's management. McLaren continued to manage Ant as he formed a new lineup of the Ants and also advised the Slits and Jimmy the Hoover.

The members of Bow Wow Wow were dressed in clothing designed by McLaren and Westwood, and he embroiled the group in such controversies as plans to publish a magazine titled Chicken, to celebrate sex between individuals under the age of consent.

=== Solo music career ===
In 1983, McLaren released Duck Rock, an album that, in collaboration with producer and co-writer Trevor Horn and the World's Famous Supreme Team (a duo of hip-hop radio disc jockeys from New York City who hosted a hip-hop and classic R&B show on WHBI 105.9 FM and were among the first DJs to introduce the art of scratching to the world). This mixed up influences from Africa and the Americas, including hip-hop. The album helped bring hip-hop to a wider audience. The singles "Buffalo Gals" and "Double Dutch" became top-10 hits in the UK, with the former also a minor regional hit in the US.

In 1984 McLaren turned to electronic music and opera on the single "Madame Butterfly", which reached No. 13 in the UK and No. 16 in Australia. The producer of the single, Stephen Hague, became much sought after following his work with McLaren on the LP Fans.

McLaren's 1989 album Waltz Darling, was a funk and disco album inspired by the voguing subculture. The singles "Waltz Darling" and "Something's Jumpin' in Your Shirt" became top-20 radio hits in Europe. A remix of "Deep in Vogue" was instrumental in bringing voguing and ball culture to wider public attention, topping the U.S. dance chart in July 1989 (some nine months before the global success of Madonna's similarly themed "Vogue"). "Deep in Vogue" is also notable for McLaren's collaborations with vogue performer Willi Ninja and filmmaker Jennie Livingston, who directed the promotional music video and gave McLaren and remix producers Mark Moore and William Orbit permission to sample audio from the soundtrack of her then-unreleased voguing documentary Paris Is Burning.

McLaren personally hired Creative Director John Carver to handle the design and art direction for "Waltz Darling". He was introduced to John by mutual friend Tommy Roberts at The Titanic nightclub, near Berkeley Square. McLaren and Carver spent a week together discussing visual references. McLaren returned to New York and Carver was left to design and art direct the album and singles sleeves.

In 1989, McLaren and composer Yanni arranged the "Flower Duet" into a work called "Aria on Air". The "Flower Duet" theme, taken from the French opera Lakmé by Léo Delibes, had already been used by composer Howard Blake to accompany British Airways commercials since 1984. However, in 1989 McLaren and Yanni further arranged the "Flower Duet" and it featured in BA's "World's Favourite Airline" global advertising campaign of the 1980s and 1990s.

In 1992, McLaren co-wrote the song "Carry On Columbus" for the feature film of the same name. The song plays over the end credits of the film.

In 1994, he recorded the concept album Paris, with appearances by such prominent French stars as actress Catherine Deneuve, musician Françoise Hardy, and fashion designer Sonia Rykiel.

In 1998, McLaren released Buffalo Gals Back 2 Skool (Virgin Records), an album featuring hip-hop artists Rakim, KRS-One, De La Soul and producer Henri Scars Struck revisiting tracks from the original Duck Rock album. That year, he also created a band called Jungk. This project was not a commercial success. Around this time he released a track called "The Bell Song" as a single available in a variety of remixes.

McLaren contributed a track, "About Her", to the soundtrack of Quentin Tarantino's 2004 film Kill Bill: Volume 2. The song heavily samples "She's Not There" by the Zombies, and uses Bessie Smith's "St. Louis Blues" by looping the phrase: "My man's got a heart like a rock cast in the sea". In November 2005, a court in Angers, France, cleared McLaren of plagiarism accusations made by French audio engineer Benjamin Beduneau. Beduneau, who had worked for McLaren and was paid by him through the studio, had taken McLaren's unfinished demos and fraudulently registered them under his own name at the French Composer Society, Sacem. The court ruled in McLaren's favor and ordered Beduneau to pay damages, which he never did.

McLaren's solo work, particularly from the Duck Rock period, has been sampled by other artists. In 1999, Dope Smugglaz had a UK Top 20 hit with the track "Double Double Dutch", which made extensive use of samples from McLaren's original "Double Dutch". In 1997, Mariah Carey's "Honey" and its "Bad Boy Remix" sampled "Hey DJ". In 2002, Eminem released a track called "Without Me", which incorporated "Buffalo Gals". In 2007, McLaren's song "World's Famous" was sampled by R&B singer Amerie on the song "Some Like It" from her album Because I Love It.

In 2001, author Paul Gorman published his book The Look: Adventures In Rock & Pop Fashion with a foreword and contributions from McLaren. The 2006 second edition included a CD featuring the track "Deux" from the Paris Remixes album.

=== Royalty payment controversies ===
In 1982, McLaren visited Johannesburg in South Africa. His hit song, "Double Dutch" was taken from "Puleng", by mbaqanga band the Boyoyo Boys, as was the flip side "Zulus on a Time Bomb", from "Tsotsi". "On the Road to Soweto" was lifted from a General M. D. Shirinda and the Gaza Sisters song "He Mdjadji", while two songs were taken from the Mahotella Queens, with "Thina Siyakhanyisa" becoming "Jive My Baby", and "Kgarebe Tsaga Mothusi" becoming "Punk It Up".

McLaren had previously plagiarised the Mahotella Queens song "Umculo Kawupheli", which formed the basis of the Bow Wow Wow hit "See Jungle! (Jungle Boy)". None of the artists concerned received any royalty payments at the time. McLaren was later sued, with a UK judge freezing royalty payments to McLaren. The case was then settled out of court for an undisclosed sum of money.

== Film production ==
In 1984, McLaren turned away from record-making in favour of theatrical and film production, starting with a musical version of the Fans album to be staged off-Broadway with the impresario Joseph Papp. This was to remain in development for three years and involved contributions from the choreographer Tommy Tune.

Simultaneously, McLaren worked with various collaborators on a film treatment which mixed the story of Beauty and the Beast with the life of the couturier Christian Dior. Titled Fashion Beast, this was among a slate of productions McLaren pitched in Hollywood in the first half of 1985 to such film industry bigwigs as entertainment mogul David Geffen and Geffen's head of production at his company, Lynda Obst.

In the summer of 1985 McLaren was appointed to the position of production executive at CBS Theatrical Films, the TV and stage arm of CBS Films. Working from an office on the CBS lot and living in a house in the hills above the Hollywood Bowl, McLaren focused on Fans: The Musical and Fashion Beast, for which he commissioned British comic book writer Alan Moore to write a script, and developed a raft of properties including Heavy Metal Surfing Nazis, about post-apocalyptic turf wars among gangs on California's environmentally damaged beaches; The Rock'n'Roll Godfather, a biopic of Led Zeppelin's manager Peter Grant; and Wilde West, based on the notion of Oscar Wilde discovering the roots of rock'n'roll during his celebrated 1882 lecture tour of the US.

McLaren gained interest in the latter project and Fans: The Musical from Steven Spielberg, and when CBS Theatrical Films closed at the end of 1985, was employed as an ideas guru at Spielberg's Amblin Entertainment while continuing to pitch his projects to other studios on a freelance basis. McLaren succeeded in attracting development funding for Fashion Beast from Manhattan nightlife entrepreneur Robert Boykin and the film was optioned by the newly founded independent production house Avenue Pictures, but after several rewrites the project faltered not least when Boykin's health suffered. He died from complications arising from Aids in 1988.

In 2012, Alan Moore adapted the Fashion Beast script for serialisation as a 10-issue comic book published by Avatar Press.

In the early 90s McLaren returned to Europe and working out of London and Paris subsequently produced several film and television projects, starting with The Ghosts of Oxford Street, which he co-directed, wrote and starred in. This was broadcast on Christmas Eve that year by British national TV channel Channel 4. This musical history of London's Oxford Street was also narrated by McLaren and included performances by Happy Mondays, Tom Jones, Rebel MC, Kirsty MacColl, John Altman and Sinéad O'Connor.

In 2000, McLaren scripted and performed in the six-part series Being Malcolm for the French digital youth channel Jimmy and continued to develop film properties, the most successful of which was the 2006 film Fast Food Nation, which he produced from Eric Schlosser's book Fast Food Nation: The Dark Side of the All-American Meal, having appointed British producer Jeremy Thomas, with whom he had worked with on The Great Rock'n'Roll Swindle, and director Richard Linklater to the project.

== Campaign to become Mayor of London ==
An article in the New Statesman, published on 20 December 1999, titled "My Vision for London", included the "McLaren Manifesto", prompting speculation that McLaren might stand to be elected as Mayor of London. With funds sourced from Sony Music by the rock music entrepreneur Alan McGee, McLaren subsequently launched a campaign to stand as an independent candidate in the inaugural elections for the position in May 2000.

With a range of policy proposals, from environmentally-sensitive traffic calming to providing public libraries with licences to serve alcohol, McLaren took to the hustings in protest at "the great political swindle of the mainstream parties who are plotting to make London expensive, oppressive and boring".

According to McLaren's campaign manager, the late entry into the mayoral race by Ken Livingstone forced him out of the running.

== Radio and TV projects ==
In 2006, McLaren presented the documentary series Malcolm McLaren's Musical Map of London for BBC Radio 2, followed in 2007 by Malcolm McLaren's Life and Times in L.A.

Also in 2007, McLaren competed in a reality TV show for ITV titled The Baron, filmed in the small Scottish fishing village of Gardenstown. The series was due to be shown in August 2007 but was postponed owing to the death of fellow contestant actor Mike Reid shortly after filming was completed. It was eventually broadcast starting on 24 April 2008. During filming McLaren was seen urinating into the harbour and loudly telling assembled inhabitants of the devout town, "Jesus is a sausage", at which point he was physically assaulted by a resident. McLaren came last in the competition, which was won by Reid.

It was announced on 7 November 2007 that McLaren would be one of the contestants in the seventh series of the ITV reality show I'm a Celebrity... Get Me Out of Here!, set in the outback of Australia and premiered on British television on Monday 12 November 2007, but he pulled out the day he had flown to Australia. He told the press "it is fake", that he didn't know any of the other celebrities and quite frankly, "he didn't have the time". He was replaced by Katie Hopkins. The following year he featured as one of the 'celebrity hijackers' in the UK TV series Big Brother: Celebrity Hijack, which was broadcast on E4. In his hijack, he encouraged the housemates to remove their clothes, daub themselves in paint and produce artwork using only their bodies and a bicycle.

About his contribution to culture, McLaren has said about himself: "I have been called many things: a charlatan, a con man, or, most flatteringly, the culprit responsible for turning British popular culture into nothing more than a cheap marketing gimmick. This is my chance to prove that these accusations are true."

== Visual art and exhibitions ==
While still an art student, McLaren had the first public exhibition of his work in 1967, which was based on an environmental installation staged at the Kingly Street Art Gallery in central London, run by a group of artists including Keith Albarn.

In 1986, McLaren participated in the 6th Sydney Biennale at the invitation of Australian curator Nick Waterlow. Waterlow chose as the theme of the arts festival "Origins Originality + Beyond", and McLaren's involvement was based around his appropriation of Édouard Manet's Le Déjeuner sur l'herbe for the cover of Bow Wow Wow's second album.

In 1988, McLaren's work across activism, art, design, fashion and music was the subject of the exhibition Impresario: Malcolm McLaren and the British New Wave at New York's New Museum of Contemporary Art.

The 1996 London exhibition I Groaned With Pain presented the fashion designs McLaren created with Vivienne Westwood. In an accompanying video interview by curators Paul Stolper and Andrew Wilson, McLaren declared of the clothing, "I don't know whether it's art. It might be bigger than art. Art has been defined today as not much more than a commodity, and I don't think these things are. They remain, even now, set up in frames, as artefacts, enigmatic.' In the last decade or so of his life, McLaren returned formally to the visual arts. In 1999, an installation created by McLaren was shown as part of the Bonnefanten's 1999 exhibit Smaak – On Taste in Maastricht. In 2005, this formed the basis of the exhibition Casino of Authenticity and Karaoke at the Zentrum für Kunst und Medientechnologie (Center for Arts and Media Karlsruhe) in Karlsruhe, Germany.

In 2008, New York City public arts group Creative Time premiered nine pieces of McLaren's 21-part sound painting series Shallow via MTV's massive HD screen in Times Square. The series, which was first shown at Art 39 Basel in June that year, was the first instalment of an ongoing public arts content partnership between Creative Time and MTV. The complete version of "Shallow 1–21" was given its full U.S. museum premiere in the Morris Gallery of the Pennsylvania Academy of the Fine Arts (PAFA), in Philadelphia, from 24 October 2009 until 3 January 2010.

In 2009, JRP Ringier published McLaren's book Musical Painting, which featured contributions from other visual artists including Damien Hirst and Jim Lambie. In the afterword, publisher Lionel Bovier wrote, "Malcolm McLaren is and has been an artist in the purest sense for his entire adult life."

At the time of his death, McLaren had recently finished a new film work entitled Paris: Capital Of The XXIst Century, which was first shown at the Baltic Centre for Contemporary Art in Gateshead, UK.

In 2011, the U.S. performance-art biennial festival Performa instituted The Malcolm, an award for the most thought-provoking entry named after McLaren and designed by Marc Newson.

In 2013, The Costume Institute of the New York Metropolitan Museum of Art exhibition "Punk: From Chaos To Couture" included the section "The Couturier Situationists" dedicated to McLaren and Westwood.

=== Posthumous exhibitions ===
An exhibition about McLaren's engagement in fashion was held as part of the Copenhagen International Fashion Fair in August 2014. "Let It Rock: The Look of Music The Sound of Fashion" was curated by Young Kim and Paul Gorman and included sections focusing on each of the six retail outlets McLaren operated with Vivienne Westwood. Original clothing, photographs and ephemera were loaned by the Malcolm McLaren Estate archive and such collectors as British fashion designer Kim Jones and musician Marco Pirroni. British fashion writer Charlie Porter praised the curation, writing on his blog: "At the Malcolm McLaren show in Copenhagen, the hang of the garments is exceptional."

McLaren's background in the visual arts as a student and practitioner was a major focus of the exhibition Art in Pop held at the contemporary art gallery Le Magasin (Centre National d'Art Contemporain) in Grenoble, France, from October 2014 to February 2015. "The main central space is dedicated to Malcolm McLaren, who embodies more than anyone the breaking open of perceptions of what constitutes an artist," wrote Magasin's Yves Aupetitallot in the exhibition introduction.

Aupetitallot curated Art in Pop with Paul Gorman, Young Kim and participating artists John Armleder and John Miller. The exhibition also included contributions from musicians Daniel Johnston, Don Van Vliet (Captain Beefheart), Genesis Breyer P-Orridge and Alan Vega as well as artists who have engaged with music such as Alix Lambert and Takuji Kogo.

The McLaren space at Art in Pop included original examples of fashion designs created with Westwood, including loans from Kim Jones, Marco Pirroni, anthropologist/writer Ted Polhemus and streetwear guru Hiroshi Fujiwara. Photography, ephemera and images from a 1969 student art show were displayed, as well as a painting from the mid-1980s entitled "I Will Be So Bad". The exhibition also included a soundtrack of music made by McLaren, prompting Marie France to describe it as "an invigorating exhibition not just to see but hear as well".

== Personal life ==
McLaren's relationship with Vivienne Westwood ended in about 1980; their son is Joseph Corré. Subsequently, McLaren was romantically involved with Andrea Linz, who was studying fashion at Saint Martin's School of Art. Linz had been a member of the German pop-disco act Chilly and went on to become a fashion designer and model. Their relationship ended when McLaren moved to Los Angeles in 1985.

In Los Angeles, McLaren became the partner of the model/actress Lauren Hutton and they lived together in Hollywood for several years. Hutton ended the relationship in the late 1980s.

McLaren was then engaged to the fashion agent Eugena Melián, with whom he lived in Los Angeles and Paris. They worked on a series of projects together; it was at Melián's urging that McLaren recorded his 1994 album Paris.

Subsequently, McLaren briefly dated the architect Charlotte Skene-Catling. Their relationship ended in the late 1990s when McLaren began a romance with Young Kim, an American woman he met at a party.

== Later life and death ==
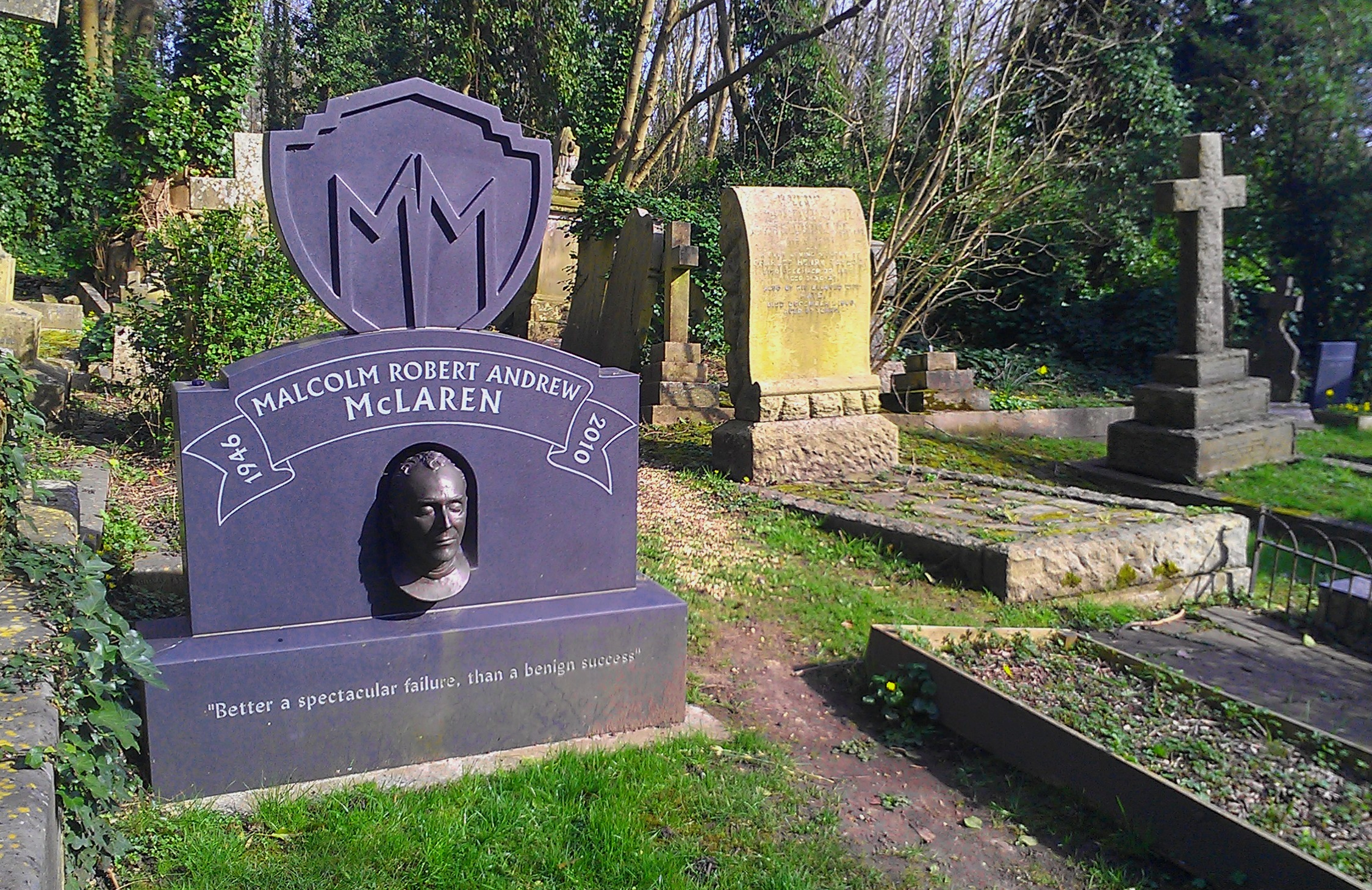
McLaren's grave in the eastern part of Highgate Cemetery

McLaren met Young Kim at a party in Paris. She was 26 and he was 25 years older. She moved in with him in 2002, and they lived together in Paris and New York. Kim was his girlfriend for the last 12 years of his life. She is the sole executor and heir of his estate.

He was diagnosed with peritoneal mesothelioma in October 2009, and died of the disease on 8 April 2010 in a hospital in Switzerland. McLaren's last words were said by his son Joseph Corré to have been "Free Leonard Peltier". Peltier was eventually freed in 2025, after receiving a presidential commutation.

Tributes poured in from friends, associates and fans – including John Lydon, who had been at odds with McLaren since the demise of the Sex Pistols. "For me, Malc was always entertaining, and I hope you remember that. Above all else, he was an entertainer and I will miss him, and so should you," he said in a statement as Johnny Rotten. Steve Jones issued a statement: "I had a soft spot for Malcolm. I have known him since I was 17 before the Pistols formed. I used to drive him around in Vivienne Westwood's car, to the tailors in London. Malcolm was the Brian Epstein of punk - without him, it wouldn't have happened the way it did. I stayed friends with him throughout the years, despite some of our differences. My fondest memory of Malcolm, and I loved the guy, was his birthday present to me when I turned 21 - he got me a hooker and some heroin."

McLaren was laid to rest in a coffin sprayed with the slogan "Too Fast To Live Too Young To Die", with his funeral attended by Westwood, Sex Pistols bandmates Paul Cook and Glen Matlock, and celebrities such as Bob Geldof, Tracey Emin and Adam Ant. The funeral was held at One Marylebone, a deconsecrated church in central London.

Bob Geldof later told John Lydon that, at the funeral, "there was a huge row between Vivienne [Westwood] and Bernie Rhodes. I mean, the man's dead – what are you people doing?". Lydon recalled, "And hearing this and the way Bob told it – so Irish and brilliant, so full of humour – I felt really, really sorry for Malcolm at that point. That these sods couldn't even let him die in peace. They were out for their own little angles."

McLaren's body was buried in Highgate Cemetery, North London, to the strains of the Sid Vicious version of "My Way".

In 2012, probate was granted to Young Kim by McLaren's will, which excluded his son Joe Corré from the inheritance.

In April 2013, a headstone was placed on McLaren's grave featuring the slogan "Better a spectacular failure, than a benign success", a paraphrasing of McLaren's claim that the best advice he received came from an art-school teacher was "It is better to be a flamboyant failure than any kind of benign success."

== TV and radio documentaries about McLaren ==
The South Bank Show: Malcolm McLaren was first broadcast on British regional channel London Weekend Television on 8 December 1984. Directed by Andy Harries and introduced by Melvyn Bragg (who noted that McLaren had been described as the "Diaghilev of punk"), the film hinged on McLaren recording tracks in America for his album Fans, and investigated his upbringing, art school years, and work with the New York Dolls, the Sex Pistols, Bow Wow Wow and others. Contributors included Sex Pistol Steve Jones, Boy George and Adam Ant.

Malcolm McLaren: Artful Dodger was screened by BBC Two in the wake of McLaren's death on 24 April 2010. Produced and directed by Jeremy Marre and presented by Alan Yentob, the programme included archive footage and contributions from Joe Corré, Young Kim and others.

Malcolm McLaren: Spectacular Failure was an hour-long examination of his life and legacy first broadcast on BBC Radio 4 on 25 April 2020 to mark the 10th anniversary of McLaren's death. Produced by Just Radio, with whom McLaren made several radio documentaries, and presented by McLaren's biographer Paul Gorman, contributors included his friend and mayoral campaign manager Peter Culshaw and the British writer and cultural commentator Lou Stoppard, who said: "Malcolm McLaren served as a precursor to the boundary-blurring, genre-defying creativity that is prevalent today. His mix of intense ambition, excitement and engagement with an almost nihilistic, bubbling apathy is something that young people today can very much relate to."
