= ABC discography =

Discography of the English pop band ABC

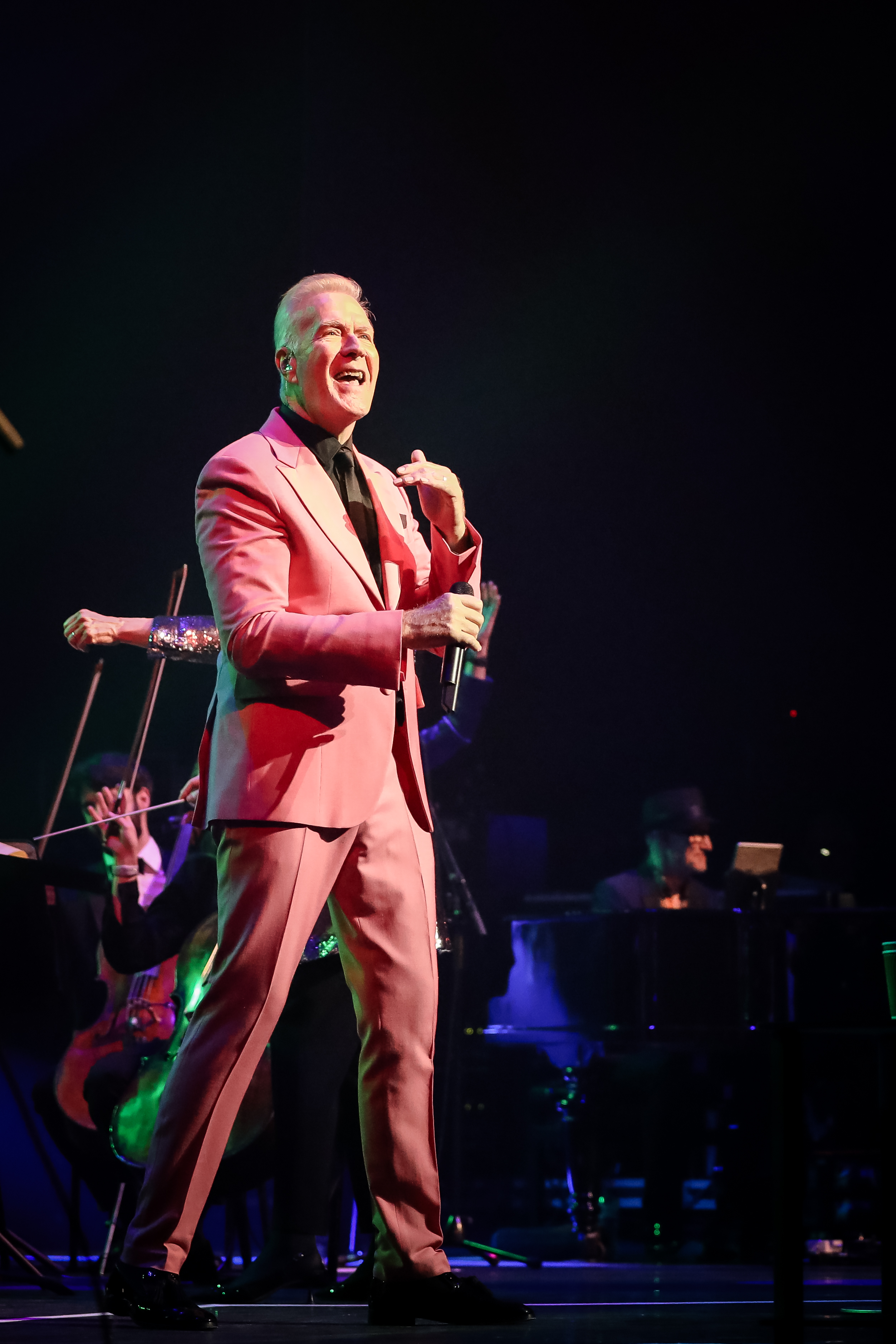
- ABC performing live, 2024
- Studio albums: 9
- Live albums: 2
- Compilation albums: 21
- Singles: 28

Here is the discography of the English pop band ABC.

== Studio albums ==
Title	Album details	Peak chart positions										Certifications
Title	Album details	UK	AUS	CAN	EUR	GER	JAP	NED	NZ	SWE	US	Certifications
The Lexicon of Love	Released: 21 June 1982; Label: Neutron (#NTRS1)	1	9	3	—	23	17	16	1	3	24	UK: Platinum; AUS: Gold; CAN: Platinum; NZ: Platinum; US: Gold
Beauty Stab	Released: 14 November 1983; Label: Neutron (#NTRL2)	12	58	36	—	50	34	29	42	32	69	UK: Gold
How to Be a ... Zillionaire!	Released: 4 October 1985; Label: Neutron (#NTRH3)	28	—	36	48	58	—	—	—	—	30	
Alphabet City	Released: 3 August 1987; Label: Neutron (#NTRH4)	7	45	47	22	20	82	19	25	—	48	UK: Gold; CAN: Gold
Up	Released: 16 October 1989; Label: Neutron (#838646)	58	—	—	—	38	—	—	—	—	—	
Abracadabra	Released: 12 August 1991; Label: Parlophone (#PCS7355)	50	—	—	65	22	—	—	—	—	—	
Skyscraping	Released: 24 March 1997; Label: Deconstruction (#7432145653)	97	—	—	—	—	—	—	—	—	—	
Traffic	Released: 28 April 2008; Label: Borough Music (#BOROCD001)	—	—	—	—	—	—	—	—	—	—	
The Lexicon of Love II	Released: 27 May 2016; Label: Virgin EMI (#4788215)	5	—	—	—	—	—	—	—	—	—	
"—" denotes items that did not chart or were not released in that territory.

== Live albums ==
Title	Album details
The Lexicon of Live	Released: 6 September 1999; Label: Blatant (#BLATCD01)
The Lexicon of Love Live	Released: 19 May 2023; Label: Live Here Now Recordings

== Compilation albums ==
=== Charting compilation albums ===
Title	Album details	Peak chart positions					Certifications
Title	Album details	UK	UK Sales	EUR	GER	SCO	Certifications
Absolutely	Released: 9 April 1990; Label: Neutron (#8429671)	7	—	26	40	—	UK: Gold
Look of Love: The Very Best of ABC	Released: 6 November 2001; Label: Mercury (#5862372)	69	—	—	—	—	UK: Gold
Essential ABC	Released: 9 October 2020; Label: Spectrum Music (#5392819)	62	20	—	—	20	
"—" denotes items that did not chart or were not released in that territory.

=== Complete list of compilation albums ===
- 1988 The Suburbs of Alphabet City (Japan only release)
- 1990 Absolutely
- 1991 Fantastic Compositions (4x CD box set, Japan only release)
- 1992 ABC 1 (UK only release)
- 1992 ABC 2 (UK only release)
- 1993 Tears Are Not Enough (Germany only release)
- 1993 The Remix Collection (UK only release)
- 1996 The Collection (Re-issued in 1998 as The Look of Love)
- 1997 Master Series
- 1999 Classic ABC
- 2000 One Better World (Germany only release)
- 2000 The Best of ABC: 20th Century Masters – The Millennium Collection (US release only)
- 2000 ABC Best – The Look of Love (Germany only release)
- 2000 Hello! An Introduction To ABC
- 2001 The Look of Love (Re-issued in 2002 as Poison Arrow)
- 2001 Look of Love: The Very Best of ABC
- 2004 The Ultimate Collection
- 2006 ABC Gold
- 2007 Never More Than Now – The ABC Collection (Europe only release)
- 2016 The Box Inside The Box (Vinyl and DVD box set)
- 2020 The Essential ABC

== Singles ==
Year	Title	Peak chart positions										Certifications	Album
Year	Title	UK	AUS	BEL	CAN	EUR	GER	IRE	NED	NZ	US	Certifications	Album
1981	"Tears Are Not Enough"	19	—	—	—	—	—	—	—	—	—		The Lexicon of Love
1982	"Poison Arrow"	6	4	19	36	—	—	14	18	5	25	UK: Silver	The Lexicon of Love
1982	"The Look of Love"	4	7	16	1	—	36	12	11	5	18	UK: Gold; CAN: Gold	The Lexicon of Love
1982	"All of My Heart"	5	21	10	13	—	67	3	20	21	—		The Lexicon of Love
1983	"That Was Then but This Is Now"	18	63	—	28	—	—	13	38	—	89		Beauty Stab
1984	"S.O.S."	39	—	—	—	—	—	—	—	—	—		Beauty Stab
1984	"(How to Be A) Millionaire"	49	—	—	52	99	—	—	—	—	20		How to Be a ... Zillionaire!
1985	"Be Near Me"	26	—	—	22	74	—	19	—	—	9		How to Be a ... Zillionaire!
1985	"Vanity Kills"	70	—	—	—	—	—	—	—	—	91		How to Be a ... Zillionaire!
1986	"Ocean Blue"	51	—	—	—	—	—	—	—	—	—		How to Be a ... Zillionaire!
1987	"When Smokey Sings"	11	25	12	5	18	52	11	13	9	5		Alphabet City
1987	"The Night You Murdered Love"	31	—	17	—	56	20	14	9	20	—		Alphabet City
1988	"King Without a Crown"	44	—	16	—	—	—	—	25	—	—		Alphabet City
1989	"One Better World"	32	—	—	—	95	51	—	—	—	—		Up
1989	"The Real Thing"	68	—	—	—	—	—	—	—	—	—		Up
1990	"The Look of Love (1990 Mix)"	68	156	—	—	—	31	30	—	44	—		Absolutely
1991	"Love Conquers All"	47	—	—	—	83	36	—	—	—	—		Abracadabra
1992	"Say It"	42	—	39	—	88	52	—	—	—	—		Abracadabra
1997	"Stranger Things"	57	—	—	—	—	—	—	—	—	—		Skyscraping
1997	"Skyscraping"	93	—	—	—	—	—	—	—	—	—		Skyscraping
1997	"Rolling Sevens"	130	—	—	—	—	—	—	—	—	—		Skyscraping
2001	"Peace and Tranquility"	—	—	—	—	—	—	—	—	—	—		Look of Love: The Very Best of ABC
2008	"The Very First Time"	—	—	—	—	—	—	—	—	—	—		Traffic
2008	"Love Is Strong"	—	—	—	—	—	—	—	—	—	—		Traffic
2016	"Viva Love"	—	—	—	—	—	—	—	—	—	—		The Lexicon of Love II
2016	"The Flames of Desire"	—	—	—	—	—	—	—	—	—	—		The Lexicon of Love II
2016	"Ten Below Zero"	—	—	—	—	—	—	—	—	—	—		The Lexicon of Love II
2020	"Look Good Tonite"	—	—	—	—	—	—	—	—	—	—		Non-album single
"—" denotes items that did not chart or were not released in that territory.

== Music videos ==
Title	Year	Director
"Poison Arrow"	1982	Julien Temple
"The Look of Love"	1982	Brian Grant
"All of My Heart"	1982	Brian Duffy
"That Was Then but This Is Now"	1983	Duncan Gibbins
"S.O.S."	1984	
"(How to Be A) Millionaire"	1984	Alan Best & Ted Hall
"Be Near Me"	1985	Peter Care
"Vanity Kills" (U.K. version)	1985	Peter Care
"Vanity Kills" (U.S.A. version)	1985	Peter Care
"Ocean Blue"	1986	Peter Care
"When Smokey Sings"	1987	Vaughan Arnell & Anthea Benton
"The Night You Murdered Love"	1987	Vaughan Arnell & Anthea Benton
"King Without a Crown"	1987	Vaughan Arnell & Anthea Benton
"One Better World"	1989	
"Love Conquers All"	1991	Mark Romanek
"Say It"	1991	Marcus Nispel
"Stranger Things"	1997	
"Skyscraping"	1997	
"Viva Love"	2016	Julien Temple
