= Look of Love: The Very Best of ABC =

Compilation album by ABC
- Released: 6 November 2001
- Genres: Synth-pop; new wave; rock
- Length: 1:09:48
- Labels: Mercury; Universal Music

ABC chronology
The Lexicon of Live (1999)	Look of Love: The Very Best of ABC (2001)	Traffic (2008)

Professional ratings
Review scores
Source	Rating
AllMusic	4.5/5 stars
The Encyclopedia of Popular Music	4/5 stars

Look of Love: The Very Best of ABC is a compilation album by the English synth-pop band ABC, released on 6 November 2001. Although essentially a reissue of greatest hits package Absolutely (which was released in 1990), the album featured two new songs by Fry titled "Peace and Tranquility" and "Blame". A companion DVD, along with a bonus disc of remixes was also released.

== Track listing ==
=== Disc one ===
Original release
No.	Title	Writer(s)	Original album	Length
1.	"The Look of Love"	Martin Fry; Mark White; Stephen Singleton; David Palmer; Mark Lickley	The Lexicon of Love (1982)	3:29
2.	"All of My Heart"	Fry; White; Singleton; Palmer	The Lexicon of Love	4:49
3.	"Poison Arrow"	Fry; White; Singleton; Palmer; Lickley	The Lexicon of Love	3:23
4.	"When Smokey Sings"	Fry; White	Alphabet City (1987)	4:18
5.	"That Was Then but This Is Now"	Fry; White; Singleton	Beauty Stab (1983)	3:33
6.	"Tears Are Not Enough" (original single version)	Fry; White; Singleton; Lickley; David Robinson	The Lexicon of Love	3:28
7.	"(How to Be a) Millionaire"	Fry; White	How to Be a ... Zillionaire! (1985)	3:34
8.	"The Night You Murdered Love" (single mix)	Fry; White	Alphabet City	4:52
9.	"Peace and Tranquility"	Fry; Chuck Kentis; Dee Palmer	New recording	4:03
10.	"One Better World"	Fry; White	Up (1989)	4:30
11.	"S.O.S."	Fry; White; Singleton	Beauty Stab	4:24
12.	"King Without a Crown"	Fry; White	Alphabet City	4:40
13.	"Be Near Me"	Fry; White	How to Be a ... Zillionaire!	3:37
14.	"Ocean Blue" (single mix)	Fry; White	How to Be a ... Zillionaire!	3:38
15.	"Vanity Kills" (single mix)	Fry; White	How to Be a ... Zillionaire!	3:33
16.	"The Real Thing"	Fry; White	Up	4:55
17.	"Blame"	Fry; Matt Rowe	New recording	5:02
Total length:				1:09:48

=== Disc two ===
Deluxe edition bonus disc
No.	Title	Writer(s)	Original album	Length
1.	"Tears Are Not Enough" (album version)	Fry; White; Singleton; Lickley; Robinson	The Lexicon of Love	3:36
2.	"Poison Arrow" (North American jazz mix)	Fry; White; Singleton; David Palmer; Lickley	The Lexicon of Love	7:04
3.	"The Look of Love" (1990 remix)	Fry; White; Singleton; David Palmer; Lickley	Absolutely (1990)	5:44
4.	"All of My Heart" (Live from Boston)	Fry; White; Singleton; David Palmer	The Lexicon of Love	6:49
5.	"Be Near Me" (Munich disco mix)	Fry; White	How to Be a ... Zillionaire!	5:28
6.	"How to Be a Millionaire" (Bond Street mix)	Fry; White	How to Be a ... Zillionaire!	6:06
7.	"Vanity Kills" (U.S.A. remix)	Fry; White	How to Be a ... Zillionaire!	5:40
8.	"ABC Megamix"	Fry; White	How to Be a ... Zillionaire!	8:54
9.	"Ocean Blue"	Fry; White	How to Be a ... Zillionaire!	3:32
10.	"When Smokey Sings" (single mix)	Fry; White	Alphabet City	4:23
11.	"The Night You Murdered Love" (Sheer-Chic mix)	Fry; White	Alphabet City	6:26
12.	"King Without a Crown" (Monarchy mix)	Fry; White	Alphabet City	8:39
13.	"One Better World" (garage mix)	Fry; White	Up	6:02

== Personnel ==
- Martin Fry – vocals
- Stephen Singleton – alto and tenor saxophones
- Mark White – guitars, keyboards, programming
- Mark Lickley – bass guitar
- David Palmer – drums, percussion
- Fiona Russell Powell – vocals
- David Yarritu – vocals

== Charts ==
Chart (2001)	Peak position
UK Albums (Official Charts)	69

== Certifications ==
Region	Certification	Certified units/sales
United Kingdom (BPI)	Gold	100,000^{‡}
^{‡} Sales+streaming figures based on certification alone.
