= Absolutely (ABC album) =

Greatest hits album by ABC
- Released: 9 April 1990
- Genres: New wave; synth-pop; pop rock; sophisti-pop; blue-eyed soul
- Length: 1:14:19
- Label: Neutron
- Producers: Trevor Horn; Steve Brown; ABC; Gary Langan; Martin Fry; Mark White; Bernard Edwards

ABC chronology
Up (1989)	Absolutely (1990)	Abracadabra (1991)

Singles from Abracadabra
- 1. "The Look of Love '90" Released: 26 March 1990

Professional ratings
Review scores
Source	Rating
AllMusic	4.5/5 stars
The Encyclopedia of Popular Music	3/5 stars
Record Mirror	5/5 stars
Robert Christgau	(1-star Honorable Mention)
Smash Hits	8/10 stars
The Great Rock Discography	7/10

Absolutely is a greatest hits album by the English pop band ABC, released in 1990. It includes most of the band's singles, from 1981 until the album's release. A video package featuring their promos was also released. A new remix of "The Look of Love" was released to promote the album, but not with approval of the band.

== Track listing ==
All tracks are written by Martin Fry and Mark White, except where noted.

UK edition
No.	Title	Writer(s)	Original album	Length
1.	"Poison Arrow"	Fry; White; Stephen Singleton; David Palmer	The Lexicon of Love	3:25
2.	"The Look of Love"	Fry; White; Singleton; Palmer; Mark Lickley	The Lexicon of Love	3:30
3.	"All of My Heart"	Fry; White; Singleton; Palmer	The Lexicon of Love	4:50
4.	"Tears Are Not Enough"	Fry; White; Singleton; Palmer; Lickley; David Robinson	The Lexicon of Love	3:31
5.	"That Was Then but This Is Now"	Fry; White; Singleton	Beauty Stab	3:35
6.	"S.O.S."	Fry; White; Singleton	Beauty Stab	4:31
7.	"(How to Be A) Millionaire"		How to Be a ... Zillionaire!	3:37
8.	"Be Near Me"		How to Be a ... Zillionaire!	3:39
9.	"When Smokey Sings"		Alphabet City	4:22
10.	"The Night You Murdered Love"		Alphabet City	4:54
11.	"King Without a Crown"		Alphabet City	4:41
12.	"One Better World"		Up	4:29
13.	"Ocean Blue" (Pacific mix (Note: "Ocean Blue" is not labeled as a remix on the compilation but is the alternate single mix, remixed by Julian Mendelsohn after the release of the How to Be a ... Zillionaire! album.))			3:40
14.	"The Look of Love" (remix (Note: The US pressing of Absolutely features the "1990 Remix" of "The Look of Love". The earlier UK pressing, however, features an edited version of the original "US Remix" of "The Look of Love", labeled simply as "The Look of Love (Remix)". This edited remix version was released earlier as "The Look of Love (Part 5)" on the UK CD single version of "The Real Thing". It is approximately two minutes shorter than the full length 12" version from 1982 and also appeared on the German (red-border) remaster of The Lexicon of Love as a bonus track, incorrectly labeled as "The Look of Love (1990 Remix)".))			5:45
15.	"When Smokey Sings" (the Miami mix)			5:10
16.	"Be Near Me" (Munich Disco mix)			5:00
17.	"One Better World" (Pickering-Park mix)			6:10

US edition
No.	Title	Original album	Length
14.	"The Look of Love" (1990 remix)	original mix from The Lexicon of Love	4:38

== Credits ==
- Ian Cooper – mastering
- DKB – design
- Paul Cox – photography
- Neil Thorpe – photography
- Bennett Freed – management (USA)
- Keith Blackhurst and Pete Hadfield for De-Construction Management – management (rest of the world)

== Charts and certifications ==
=== Weekly charts ===
Chart	Peak position
UK Albums Chart	7

=== Certifications ===
Region	Certification	Certified units/sales
United Kingdom (BPI)	Gold	100,000^{^}
^{^} Shipments figures based on certification alone.
