= The Lexicon of Live =

Live album by ABC
- Released: 1999
- Genres: Dance-pop; new wave; synth-pop; electronic
- Length: 55:39
- Label: Blatant

ABC chronology
Skyscraping (1997)	The Lexicon of Live (1999)	Look of Love: The Very Best of ABC (2001)

Professional ratings
Review scores
Source	Rating
AllMusic	2.5/5 stars

The Lexicon of Live is a live album by the English pop band ABC, released in 1999 by Blatant. Although Martin Fry was the only original member left, he had a backing band, and performed in his trademark gold suit.

== Track listing (1999 Blatant BLATCD 01) ==
All songs written by ABC except where indicated.

1. "Poison Arrow" – 3:56
2. "Stranger Things" – 4:43
3. "When Smokey Sings" – 4:20
4. "(How to Be A) Millionaire" – 3:31
5. "Be Near Me" – 4:38
6. "Who Can I Turn To?" – 4:03
7. "Show Me" – 3:35
8. "Skyscraping" – 4:45
9. "Rolling Sevens" – 4:46
10. "One Better World" – 3:53
11. "Tears Are Not Enough" – 4:00
12. "All of My Heart" – 5:29
13. "The Look of Love" – 4:00

== Personnel ==
- Martin Fry – lead vocals
- Keith Lowndes – guitars
- Mark Walker – keyboards
- Steve Walters – bass guitar
- Ian Thompson – keyboards, saxophone
- Velroy Bailey – drums
- Beverley McLean, T.J. Davis & Darae – backing vocals
