= Fiona Russell Powell =

British journalist

- Also known as: Eden, Cooper O'Kelly (as poet)
- Born: 2 April 1962 (age 64)
- Origin: England, United Kingdom
- Genres: Pop
- Occupations: Musician; journalist
- Instrument: Vocals
- Years active: 1982–present
- Label: Mercury
- Formerly of: ABC

Fiona Russell Powell (born 2 April 1962) is a British journalist. She is best known for her series of interviews throughout the 1980s in The Face magazine. For a brief period in the mid-1980s, she performed as a member of pop band ABC in videos and onstage to support their cartoon-synth album How to Be a ... Zillionaire! (1985). She was credited originally as "Fiona" in early recordings of material for this album, but eventually performed under the stage name "Eden".

== Early life and career ==
Growing up in Dore, Sheffield, she had known ABC from their early days as an electronic three-piece called Vice Versa.

In 1982, aged 20, she began writing for The Face as a features writer, concentrating mostly on music and became known for her irreverent mickey-taking interviews with leading pop stars of the day.

== ABC ==
After the success of ABC's debut album The Lexicon of Love (1982) and the disappointing reception to their follow up Beauty Stab (1983), ABC's Martin Fry and Mark White decided they wanted a completely new image for ABC. To that end, they asked Powell to join the band as well as American David Yarritu.

Neither Powell nor Yarritu were allowed to contribute musically. When Powell admitted she couldn't play any instruments, ABC frontman Martin Fry replied "It doesn't matter. You can pretend. We want you because you've got a great look". Vocals attributed to Powell as Eden on the album How to Be a ... Zillionaire! were not performed by her either – for example, in the song "A to Z", the words "Hi, I'm Eden, and I want you to kiss my snatch" was actually Martin Fry's voice sped up and was recorded entirely without Powell's knowledge.

Inflatable instruments were made for the band with the aim to be as luridly bright and "cartoony" as possible. Eden even wore a dildo belt she made on The Tube, the 1980s Channel 4 live music show, which was a belt covered in "ladyfingers" – very small white dildoes – to look like a bullet belt. The new look ABC went over well enough; in the UK and the US How to Be a ... Zillionaire! charted in the top 30, while "Be Near Me" was the highest-charting track off the album at No. 26 in the UK and in the top ten on the US Billboard Hot 100.

== Journalistic career ==
Powell has written for Punch, The Face, BLITZ, i-D, Daily Express, Time Out and New Humanist, among others.
