= Yarritu =

Yarritu is a family name of Spanish Basque origin which means graceful bridge.

== Coat of arms ==
The gentlemen's Major Stamp was received by the Yarritu family in Bilbao and in the Real Chancillery in Valladolid in 1726, 1790, and 1798. As a result, the coat of arms was designed in a field of silver with three black smelting basins, forming a triangle, with a golden band stretched across the center. The emblem states (English translation): "Going well, they will not suffer".

== People with the surname Yarritu ==
- David Yarritu, member of ABC (band), a 1980s new wave band
