= The Lexicon of Love II =

Studio album by ABC
- Released: 27 May 2016
- Genre: Pop
- Length: 45:19
- Label: Virgin EMI
- Producer: Martin Fry; Gary Stevenson

ABC chronology
Traffic (2008)	The Lexicon of Love II (2016)

The Lexicon of Love II is the ninth studio album by the English band ABC. It was released on 27 May 2016 on Virgin EMI, eight years after their previous album Traffic.

After a 2009 performance of ABC's 1982 studio album The Lexicon of Love in concert with Anne Dudley, lead singer of the band Martin Fry felt that it was time to develop a proper follow-up to the album. He wrote over 40 songs for The Lexicon of Love II with various guest writers and recorded it with himself and Gary Stevenson producing. On the album's release, it received generally favourable reviews.

== Production ==
In 2009, ABC member Martin Fry played The Lexicon of Love in its entirety at the Royal Albert Hall with the BBC Concert Orchestra which was conducted by Anne Dudley. This performance led to Fry desiring to create a proper follow-up to The Lexicon of Love. Fry created the album with the title The Lexicon of Love II, noting that "People have a great affection for the first record, [but] I'm beyond risk now."

Production on the album began in October 2015. All of the songs were written in the order that they were presented on the record with the exception of "Viva Love" which Fry described as a song that "had been knocking round from way back that had never really been released". Versions of "Viva Love" and "Kiss Me Goodbye" had previously appeared on a 2005 download version of Abracadabra. The songs were written with several guests including Rob Fusari. Fry and his writers initially had 40 new songs in total, and had to persuade Virgin Records to listen to a few of the songs during one of his many meetings about compilation albums. Trevor Horn, who had produced The Lexicon of Love, was not available for the new album which led to Fry and producer Gary Stevenson to produce it.

== Style ==
The Lexicon of Love II's album cover makes reference to the original's album cover.

The Lexicon of Love II emulated the style of ABC's 1982 debut album, The Lexicon of Love. Dave Simpson (The Guardian) expanded on this noting "lush orchestrations, hurtling brass and synth stabs."

The cover of The Lexicon of Love II makes reference to the original album. The Guardian opined that the cover, which shows Martin Fry watching two young models from the wings of a theatre, represented "Fry’s younger self and the sort of unattainable, irresistible woman that he used to pursue in song."

== Release ==
The Lexicon of Love II was released on 27 May 2016 on Virgin EMI. The release of the album was followed by a tour of festival shows during mid-2016, followed by a scheduled ABC tour in the latter half of the year including one show with an orchestra, the Southbank Sinfonia, at the Royal Festival Hall, conducted by Anne Dudley.

On the album's release in the United Kingdom, The Lexicon of Love II charted at number 5 on the Official Albums Chart, ABC's first album to enter the Top 10 in 26 years.

== Critical reception ==
Professional ratings
Aggregate scores
Source	Rating
Metacritic	70/100
Review scores
Source	Rating
AllMusic	4/5 stars
The Guardian	4/5 stars
The Independent	2/5 stars
The Quietus	4.5/5 stars
Record Collector	4/5 stars
The Times	2/5 stars

At Metacritic, which assigns a normalised rating out of 100 to reviews from mainstream critics, the album has received an average score of 70, indicating generally favourable reviews, based on eight reviews. The Guardian gave the album a positive review, stating that it was "the sound of an old master falling not far short of a standard that his youthful self set very high indeed."

Tim Sendra of AllMusic noted that the album did not reach the heights of previous singles such as "The Look of Love" or "Poison Arrow" but stated that "there aren't any weak links either, and the album holds together unexpectedly well", specifically praising the songs "Viva Love", "The Ship of the Seasick Sailor" and "The Flames of Desire". The review concluded that the album "could have failed miserably trying to re-create the sound of Lexicon exactly, making it a stale nostalgic exercise that would have tarnished the original by association. Instead, they got at what makes it great -- the over the top romanticism, the audacious vocals, and the widescreen melodies -- and gave it a wiser, more thoughtful update."

The Independent gave the album a negative review, stating that "too many of these tracks are slight ideas and punning phrasework over-egged into grotesque wedding-cakes by Dudley's billowing strings, leaving Fry stranded in the position summarised in 'Brighter Than The Sun': 'I'm a man out of time/Looking for a mountain to climb'."

== Track listing ==
No.	Title	Writer(s)	Length
1.	"The Flames of Desire"	Martin Fry; Charlie Mole; Marcus Vere	4:27
2.	"Viva Love"	Fry; Mole; Vere	4:14
3.	"Ten Below Zero"	Fry; Mole; Vere	3:58
4.	"Confessions of a Fool"	Fry; Rob Fusari	3:55
5.	"Singer Not the Song"	Fry; Fusari	4:10
6.	"The Ship of the Seasick Sailor"	Fry; Fusari	4:41
7.	"Kiss Me Goodbye"	Fry; Mole; Vere	4:52
8.	"I Believe in Love"	Fry; Matt Rowe	4:42
9.	"The Love Inside the Love"	Fry; Anne Dudley	4:12
10.	"Brighter Than the Sun"	Fry; Dudley	5:13
11.	"Viva Love Reprise"	Fry; Mole; Vere	0:55

== Personnel ==
ABC

- Martin Fry – lead and backing vocals

Additional musicians

- Anne Dudley – acoustic piano, keyboards, orchestrations
- Rob Fusari – keyboards, programming
- Dave West – keyboards, programming
- Peter Gordeno – additional keyboards and programming
- Stephen Darrell Smith – additional acoustic piano
- Matt Backer – guitars
- Richard Barrett – guitars
- Vinzenz Benjamin – bass guitar
- Richard Brook – drums
- Carol Kenyon – backing vocals
- Gina Foster – backing vocals

== Production ==
- Producer – Gary Stevenson
- Executive producer – Martin Fry
- Mastered by Tim Young at Metropolis Mastering (London, UK).
- Art direction – Mat Maitland
- Photography – Henrik Knudsen
- Management – John Glover and Matt Glover with Blueprint Management
