= Say It (ABC song) =

Single by ABC

from the album Abracadabra
- B-side: "Satori"
- Released: 30 December 1991
- Recorded: 1991
- Genre: Pop
- Length: 4:21
- Label: EMI
- Songwriters: Martin Fry; Mark White
- Producer: ABC

ABC singles chronology
"Love Conquers All" (1991)	"Say It" (1991)	"Stranger Things" (1997)

"Say It" is a song by the English pop band ABC, with additional remixing by the team behind the Italian house music group Black Box. It was written by Martin Fry and Mark White and released in December 1991 by EMI Records as a 7" single, 12" single and CD single from the band's sixth album, Abracadabra (1991).

== Critical reception ==
Upon its release as a single, Stuart Maconie of NME described "Say It" as an "inconsequential House ditty" and added, "I like the guitar, I like the Philly strings. I don't like anything else. But 'I was baked Alaska' must be the bravest lyrical gambit of the decade. A pity this germ of lunacy couldn't have infect more of the song."

== Track listing ==
- 7" single
1. "Say It" (The Black Box Mix)
2. "Say It" (The Abracadabra Mix)
- 12" single
1. "Say It" (The Black Box Mix)
2. "Say It" (The Black Box Mix Instrumental)
3. "Say It" (The Black Box Piano Forte Mix)
4. "Say It" (The Abracadabra Mix)
- CD single
1. "Say It" (The Black Box Mix Edit)
2. "Say It" (The Abracadabra Mix)
3. "Satori"
4. "Say It" (The Black Box Mix)

== Charts ==
Chart (1992)	Peak position
Belgium (Ultratop 50 Flanders)	39
Germany (GfK)	52
UK Singles (OCC)	42
UK Airplay (Music Week)	42
UK Dance (Music Week)	29
UK Club Chart (Music Week)	96
US Hot Dance Club Play (Billboard)	3
US Hot Dance Music/Maxi-Singles Sales (Billboard)	13
