= The Real Thing (ABC song) =

Single by ABC

from the album Up
- B-side: "The Greatest Love of All"
- Released: 11 September 1989
- Recorded: 1988
- Genre: House
- Length: 4:52
- Label: PolyGram; Neutron; Mercury
- Songwriters: Martin Fry; Mark White
- Producers: Martin Fry; Mark White

ABC singles chronology
| "One Better World" (1989) | "The Real Thing" (1989) | "The Look of Love '90" (1990) |

"The Real Thing" is a song by the English pop band ABC, released as the second single from their fifth studio album, Up (1989).

The song peaked at No. 68 on the UK Singles Chart, their lowest charting single there since "Vanity Kills" in 1986.

== Critical reception ==
On its release, Lisa Tilston of Record Mirror wrote, "ABC seem to have gone full circle, with the beginning of this sounding just like 'The Look of Love' set to a dance beat. Fair, but not their best."

== Track listing ==
- UK 7" Single
1. "The Real Thing" 3:34
2. "The Greatest Love of All" 3:31

== Charts ==
| Chart (1989) | Peak position |
|---|---|
| UK singles chart | 68 |
