= Traffic (ABC album) =

Studio album by ABC
- Released: 28 April 2008
- Recorded: 2007–2008
- Genre: Rock
- Length: 47:10
- Label: Borough Music
- Producers: Martin Fry; Chuck Kentis; David Palmer

ABC chronology
Look of Love: The Very Best of ABC (2001)	Traffic (2008)	The Lexicon of Love II (2016)

Professional ratings
Review scores
Source	Rating
AllMusic	3.5/5 stars
BBC Music	favourable
The Encyclopedia of Popular Music	3/5 stars

Traffic is the eighth studio album by the English band ABC and their first album of original material released in eleven years. The album's songs were written while the band toured the United States in 2006. One critic has described the album as the most "satisfying ABC album since the mid-'80s by far".

Drummer David Palmer, who left the band in 1982 after recording The Lexicon of Love, returned to record this album, for which he co-wrote all of the tracks. Gary Langan also returned to mix the album after working as a sound engineer on The Lexicon of Love and producing Beauty Stab (1983).

AllMusic described Traffic as "the album that ABC fans were probably hoping for in 1985" and considered that Martin Fry's "lyrical mastery was back in place" in the album's songs which showed "an elegant mix of soul and style".

== Track listing ==
All songs written and composed by Martin Fry, Chuck Kentis and David Palmer.

1. "Sixteen Seconds to Choose" – 3:12
2. "The Very First Time" – 3:39
3. "Ride" – 3:37
4. "Love Is Strong" – 4:07
5. "Caroline" – 4:45
6. "Life Shapes You" – 3:50
7. "One Way Traffic" – 3:44
8. "Way Back When" – 4:13
9. "Validation" – 3:57
10. "Lose Yourself" – 4:03
11. "Fugitives" – 4:02
12. "Minus Love" – 4:08

=== Singles ===
The album's first single, "The Very First Time", received airplay on BBC Radio 2. A poll on the band's MySpace page considered that "Life Shapes You" would make the best second single but in fact "Love Is Strong" was selected. "Love Is Strong" was released as a single on 18 August 2008.

== Personnel ==
ABC

- Martin Fry – vocals
- David Palmer – drums, percussion

Additional musicians

- Steve Kelly – keyboards
- Chuck Kentis – keyboards
- Jason Nesmith – keyboards, guitars, bass, backing vocals
- Matt Backer – guitars
- Don Kirkpatrick – guitars
- Oliver Leiber – guitars
- Paul Warren – guitars
- Andy Carr – bass
- Lance Morrison – bass
- Simon Willescroft – saxophones
- David Williamson – trombone
- Dan Carpenter – trumpet
- Julie Delgado – backing vocals
- Natasha Pierce – backing vocals
- Jackie Simley – backing vocals
- Fred White – backing vocals

== Production ==
- Martin Fry – producer
- Chuck Kentis – producer
- David Palmer – producer
- Gary Langan – mix engineer
- Ian Cooper – mastering
- Storey London Design – artwork
- Blueprint Management – management
