= S.O.S. (ABC song) =

Single by ABC

from the album Beauty Stab
- B-side: "United Kingdom"
- Released: 9 January 1984
- Genre: Synth-pop
- Length: 4:49
- Label: Neutron; Mercury; Vertigo
- Songwriters: Martin Fry; Stephen Singleton; Mark White
- Producers: ABC; Gary Langan

ABC singles chronology
"That Was Then but This Is Now" (1983)	"S.O.S." (1984)	"(How to Be A) Millionaire" (1984)

Music video
- "S.O.S." on YouTube

"S.O.S." is a song by the English new wave and synth-pop band ABC. It was released in early 1984 as the second single from their second studio album, Beauty Stab (1983). It peaked at No. 39 on the UK singles chart.

== Track listing ==
1. "S.O.S." – 4:48
2. "United Kingdom" – 3:19

== Chart performance ==
Chart (1984)	Peak position
UK Singles (Official Charts)	39
