= David Yarritu =

American musician and photographer

- Born: United States
- Genres: Rock; new wave
- Occupations: Musician; photographer
- Instrument: Vocals
- Years active: 1985–present
- Labels: Mercury
- Formerly of: ABC

David Yarritu is an American musician and photographer, best known for his short stint as a member of the English pop band ABC in the 1980s. He was featured in several music videos from the band's third studio album How to Be a ... Zillionaire!, including "Be Near Me" (1985).

Yarritu's only credited role in the production of How to Be a ... Zillionaire! was providing spoken passages on some tracks. He and Eden (Fiona Russell Powell) were hired for ABC's Zillionaire! era mainly for their unconventional look onstage and in music videos. In Yarritu's case, it was his short stature, shaven head, oversized eyeglasses, and diminutive build. He was the lone American in the band.

Today Yarritu is based in New York City and works as a freelance photographer. Among his works is a retrospective of Wigstock through the years in a series of Polaroid photographs.

== Albums with ABC ==
- How to Be a ... Zillionaire! (1985)
