= Vanity Kills =

Single by ABC

from the album How to Be a ... Zillionaire!
- B-side: "Judy's Jewels"
- Released: 31 May 1985
- Recorded: December 1984
- Genre: Synth-pop
- Length: 3:28
- Label: Neutron; Mercury; Vertigo
- Songwriter(s): Martin Fry; Mark White
- Producer(s): Martin Fry; Mark White

ABC singles chronology
"Be Near Me" (1985)	"Vanity Kills" (1985)	"Ocean Blue" (1986)

Music video
- "Vanity Kills" on YouTube

"Vanity Kills" is a song by the English pop band ABC, released as the third single from their third studio album, How to Be a ... Zillionaire! (1985). It peaked at No. 70 on the UK Singles Chart and reached No. 91 on the U.S. Billboard Hot 100.

== Composition ==
The song is in a C key and a major mode with a BPM of 125.

== Music video ==
Two music videos were made by the band ABC. The UK video shows the four band members moving against a dark background, using simple stop motion camera tricks.

The US version, directed by Peter Care, has a spoken prologue and epilogue, and presents Martin Fry and Mark White as noir detectives, investigating a variety of shady characters.

== Track listing ==
- UK 7" Single
1. "Vanity Kills"
2. "Judy's Jewels"

== Chart performance ==
Chart (1985)	Peak position
UK Singles Chart	70
U.S. Billboard Hot 100	91
U.S. Billboard Hot Dance Club Play	5
