= Ocean Blue (song) =

Single by ABC

from the album How to Be a ... Zillionaire!
- B-side: "Tower of London"
- Released: 3 January 1986
- Recorded: December 1984
- Length: 3:36
- Label: Neutron; Mercury
- Songwriter(s): Martin Fry; Mark White
- Producer(s): Martin Fry; Mark White

ABC singles chronology
"Vanity Kills" (1985)	"Ocean Blue" (1986)	"When Smokey Sings" (1987)

"Ocean Blue" is a song by the English pop band ABC, released as the fourth single from their third studio album, How to Be a ... Zillionaire!.

The song peaked at No. 51 on the UK Singles Chart; the song failed to chart on the Billboard Hot 100. The single was the only single from the album not to chart on the Hot 100; their next single to chart there would be "When Smokey Sings" the following year.

The single version was remixed by Julian Mendelsohn with a drum-track by David Palmer and a string-arrangement by Anne Dudley after the release of the album. The "Pacific Mix" is similar to the single remix but does not feature the string arrangement. The "Atlantic Mix" from the 12 inch single A-side is a mostly instrumental "dub" remix.

== Music video ==
The song's music video, shot in black and white, features lead singer Martin Fry singing the song, intercut with scenes of violinists and the remaining members of the band.

== Track listings ==
UK 7" single

1. "Ocean Blue"
2. "Tower of London"

UK 12" single

1. "Ocean Blue" (Atlantic Mix)
2. "Tower of London"
3. "Be Near Me" (Ecstasy Mix)
4. "Ocean Blue" (Pacific Mix)

== Chart performance ==
Chart (1986)	Peak position
UK Singles Chart	51
