= That Was Then but This Is Now =

Single by ABC

from the album Beauty Stab
- B-side: "Vertigo"
- Released: 28 October 1983
- Recorded: 1983
- Genre: Pop rock
- Length: 3:33
- Label: Mercury; Neutron; Phonogram; Vertigo
- Songwriters: Martin Fry; Mark White; Stephen Singleton
- Producers: ABC; Gary Langan

ABC singles chronology
"All of My Heart" (1982)	"That Was Then but This Is Now" (1983)	"S.O.S." (1984)

Music video
- "That Was Then but This Is Now" on YouTube

"That Was Then but This Is Now" is a song by the English pop band ABC. It was released in October 1983 as the lead single from their second studio album, Beauty Stab. It was the band's third entry on the US Billboard Hot 100, peaking at No. 89.

== Music video ==
The music video shows them playing on a stage behind a huge Risk-style world map gameboard; scenes of the band playing, accompanied by various flags, are interspersed with scenes of a helicopter taking off and then exploding.

== Critical reception ==
Upon its release in October 1983, it was "Single of the Forthnight" in Smash Hits. "[A]part from the lousy chorus, I think it's one of the most exciting things they've done", Peter Martin wrote, "Fast and furious, the song still manages to retain a feeling of stylish grandeur that is the hallmark of ABC's work".

The song features the heavily criticised lyric, "Can't complain, mustn't grumble, help yourself to another piece of apple crumble." Roddy Frame of Aztec Camera censured the line, feeling that it embodied all that was wrong with 1980s pop music. It has frequently appeared in "worst lyrics" poll results, and was voted the worst line ever in a 2007 BBC 6 Music survey. Critic and Saint Etienne co-founder Bob Stanley said, "It had perhaps been meant as a joke – it was followed by a cheesy sax break."

== Track listing ==
1. "That Was Then but This Is Now" – 3:33
2. "Vertigo" – 1:53

== Chart performance ==
Chart	Position
Australia (Kent Music Report)	63
Canada Top Singles (RPM)	26
Ireland (IRMA)	13
Netherlands (Dutch Top 40)	38
UK Singles Chart	18
US Billboard Hot 100	89
