= Vice Versa (band) =

English electronic band

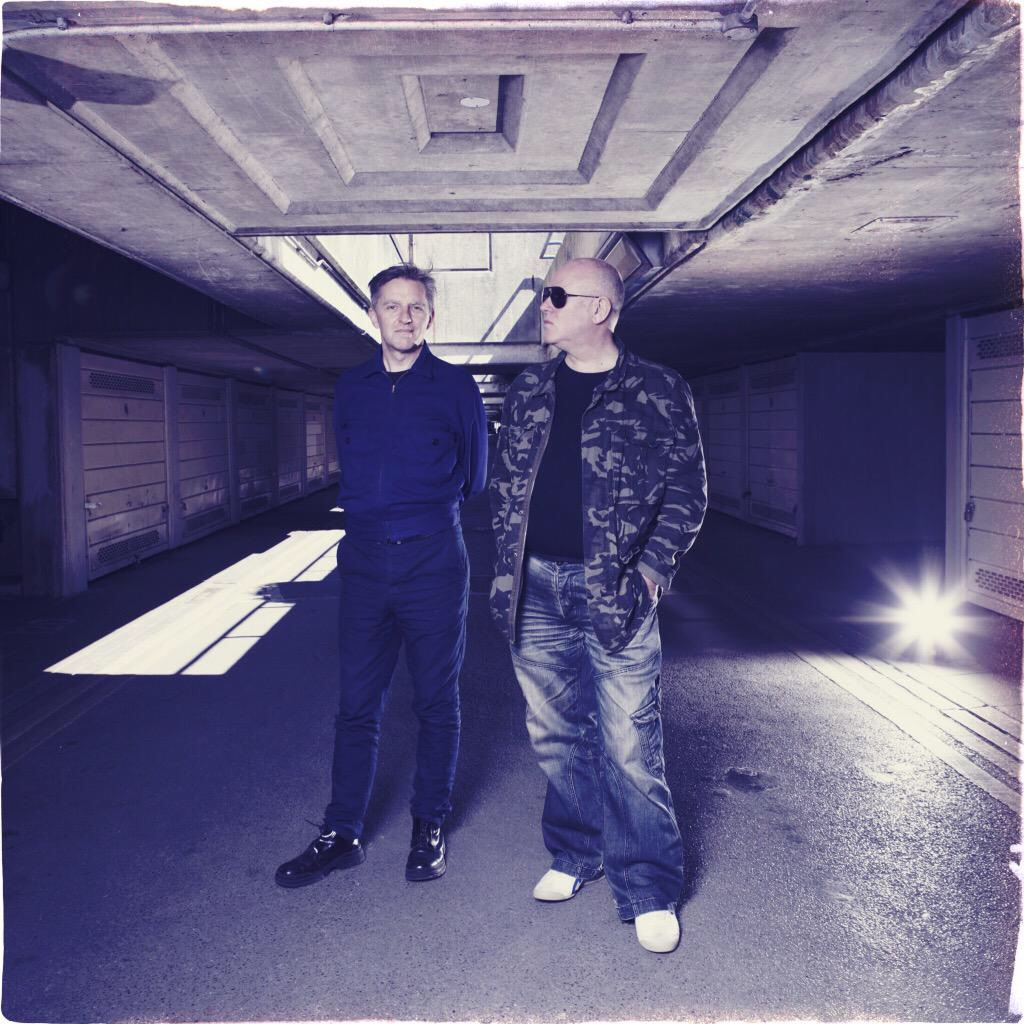
- Vice Versa's current line-up of Stephen Singleton (left) and Mark White

Background information
- Origin: Sheffield, England
- Genres: Electronic; synth-pop
- Years active: 1977–1980; 2014–present
- Labels: Neutron; Backstreet; VOD
- Spinoff of: ABC
- Members: Stephen Singleton; Mark White
- Past members: Ian Garth; David Sydenham; Martin Fry

Vice Versa are an electronic band that formed in Sheffield, England, in 1977. Vice Versa originally consisted of Stephen Singleton, Mark White, Ian Garth, and David Sydenham, the former two of whom would go on to later found the successful 1980s pop band ABC. The band was active from 1977 to 1980 with the aforementioned line-up, and reformed in 2015 without Garth and Sydenham. Vice Versa are considered one of the "Big Four" late-1970s minimalistic electronic/synth-based bands from Sheffield. They share this title with Cabaret Voltaire, Clock DVA and the Human League.

== History ==
The band was formed in 1977 by Stephen Singleton, Mark White, Ian Garth and David Sydenham, with Singleton and Sydenham on synthesizers, Garth on guitar and synthesizer and later White on vocals. Their first concert took place at the Doncaster Outlook club supporting Wire. Their first major Sheffield gig was with the Human League at the Now Society at Sheffield University, called "Wot, no Drummers", in reference to the fact that drum machines were used by all participating bands in place of real drums.

In 1978 they performed supporting Human League. In late 1978 White and Singleton founded their own independent record label called Neutron Records to release their music, as synth-based music was still being ignored by the major music labels and music industry as a whole at the time. Their first release came in the form of 1979's EP Music 4, which was followed up by the release of a set of prints and a manifesto.

In 1980, the band released a six-sided fold-out EP named 1980: The First Fifteen Minutes. Vice Versa, Clock DVA, the Stunt Kites and I'm So Hollow (all then-local bands) each contributed one track to the EP, providing each of the bands their first proper vinyl exposure before getting their individual record deals. The EP was also named "single of the week" by NME, much to the surprise of the band.

At that time and after Sydenham had decided to leave the band, the band played numerous gigs in the UK. Sydenham was eventually replaced by Martin Fry, who at that time was writing for his fanzine Modern Drugs. He interviewed White and Singleton for the fanzine and then "never left". During 1980 Vice Versa made two more releases; the cassette-only album 8 Aspects of, followed by their only single release, "Stilyagi" (with "Eyes of Christ" as the B-side). The tracks were taken from the aforementioned cassette album and remixed (apparently from the very cassette at the Backstreet/Backlash Studio in Rotterdam). This would prove to be the band's final release in their initial incarnation.

When touring in the Netherlands they were invited to jam in a studio in Rotterdam, where Fry started to improvise on vocals. Everybody was surprised by the quality of his voice, and decided to make him the lead singer of the band. The band then spent about a year writing new songs and thinking of a new name and concept; this progress being the Vice Versa-to-ABC transformation.

== Later years ==
In 2014, German label VOD Records released a box-set named Electrogenesis 1978–1980, which was compiled by the original band members White and Singleton. The box set included 4 LPs and a bonus 7-inch ("Genetic Warfare" by Vice Versa and Adi Newton). The set also includes an extensive 48-page LP-sized history of Vice Versa and Neutron Records with many unpublished photographs, unseen original artwork, a metal enamel badge, four full-colour printed inner sleeves and, in honour of the venue that gave Vice Versa their first opportunities, the box also includes a paper kit synthesizer called "nowsoc78", which could be assembled with scissors and glue.

The 4 LPs compiled in the box-set were:

- The Vice-Pop – Studio Electrophonique Sessions 1978–1979
- The Anti-Pop Bowood Road Sessions 1978–1980
- 8 Aspects of Vice Versa (April 1980)
- Live in Concert 1979–1980

Creating the box set led to the reformation of Vice Versa in 2014. In December 2015 the duo released a Christmas single called "Little Drum Machine Boy", which was available to download for free on SoundCloud. They are currently writing and recording new material.

== Discography ==
Year	Title	Product	Label	Catalogue number
1979	Music 4	7-inch EP	Neutron Records	NT001
1979	Neutron Datapack	Data	Neutron Records	NT002
1979	1980: The First 15 Minutes	7-inch EP	Neutron Records	NT003
1980	8 Aspects Of	CAS album	Neutron Records	Neutron cassette
1980	"Stilyagi" / "Eyes of Christ"	7-inch	Backstreet Records (NL)	BBR003
2014	Electrogenesis 1978–1980	4-LP box set	VOD Records (GE)	VOD116
2015	"Little Drum Machine Boy"	Single download	White label	N/A

== Awards ==
- 2016 – Best Reissue of the Year – Classic Pop
