= (How to Be A) Millionaire =

1984 song by the English band ABC

Single by ABC

from the album How to Be a ... Zillionaire!
- B-side: "(How to Be A) Billionaire"
- Released: 2 November 1984
- Recorded: 1984
- Genre: Synth-pop
- Length: 3:34
- Label: Mercury; Neutron; Phonogram; Vertigo
- Songwriters: Martin Fry; Mark White
- Producers: Martin Fry; Mark White

ABC singles chronology
"S.O.S." (1984)	"(How to Be A) Millionaire" (1984)	"Be Near Me" (1985)

"(How to Be A) Millionaire" is a song by the English pop band ABC. It was the first single taken from their third studio album, How to Be a ... Zillionaire! (1985).

The single peaked at a modest No. 49 on the UK Singles Chart, though it fared better in the US where it reached No. 20 on the US Billboard Hot 100 and No. 4 on the Hot Dance Club Play chart.

== Critical reception ==
Upon its release, the song received a poor reception by Smash Hits reviewer Neil Tennant who found ABC imitating American dance records "There's no originality or feeling – ABC are just desperately apeing an already over-imitated sound."

== Music video ==
The animated music video shows a cartoon Martin Fry and Mark White being overwhelmed by their luxury goods, which are continually growing in size. The other two band members make a brief appearance also in animated form.

== Track listing ==
=== 7": Neutron NT107 ===
1. "(How to Be A) Millionaire" – 3:30
2. "(How to Be A) Billionaire" – 3:37

=== 12": Neutron NTXR 107 ===
1. "(How to Be A) Zillionaire" (Bond Street Mix) – 6:05
2. "(How to Be A) Millionaire" (Single Remix) – 3:31
3. "(How to Be A) Millionaire" (A Capella Version) – 3:30

=== 12": Neutron NTX 107 ===
1. "(How to Be A) Zillionaire" (Wall Street Mix) – 7:33
2. "(How to Be A) Millionaire" – 3:31
3. "(How to Be A) Millionaire" (Accapella) – 3:30
4. "(How to Be A) Millionaire" (Nickel & Dime Mix) – 5:22 (included on US version only)

== Chart performance ==
Chart (1986)	Peak position
UK Singles Chart	49
U.S. Billboard Hot 100	20
U.S. Billboard Hot Dance Club Play	4

== In popular culture ==
- The CBS Orchestra played the song for Regis Philbin when he was a guest on the Late Show with David Letterman. Philbin was the former host of Who Wants to Be a Millionaire for the ABC television network.
- The song appears in the film Party Monster (2003).
