= Alphabet City (album) =

Studio album by ABC
- Released: 3 August 1987 (US); 12 October 1987 (UK)
- Recorded: 1986–1987
- Studio: Marcus Recording Studios (London)
- Genres: Sophisti-pop; dance-pop; blue-eyed soul
- Length: 40:55
- Labels: Mercury; Phonogram; Neutron
- Producers: Mark White; Martin Fry; Bernard Edwards

ABC chronology
How to Be a ... Zillionaire! (1985)	Alphabet City (1987)	Up (1989)

Singles from Alphabet City
- 1. "When Smokey Sings" Released: 26 May 1987; 2. "The Night You Murdered Love" Released: 24 August 1987; 3. "King Without a Crown" Released: November 1987

Professional ratings
Review scores
Source	Rating
AllMusic	2.5/5 stars
The Encyclopedia of Popular Music	3/5 stars
Record Mirror	5/5 stars
Smash Hits	8/10

Alphabet City is the fourth studio album by the English pop band ABC. It was originally released in August 1987, on the labels Mercury, Phonogram and Neutron, two years after their previous album How to Be a ... Zillionaire! Following a hiatus in which singer Martin Fry was being treated for Hodgkin's disease, it was recorded over a period of nine months, in sessions that took place at Marcus Recording Studios in London, assisted by Bernard Edwards, best known for his work with the American band Chic.

The album's title and the titles of several tracks were inspired by the Alphabet City section of Manhattan, New York City, where Fry and Mark White lived for a time prior to the album's release. It peaked at No. 7 in the UK, making it their first album to reach the Top 10 since their debut The Lexicon of Love. The album launched three charting singles in the UK. "When Smokey Sings", a tribute to Smokey Robinson, peaked at No. 11 on the UK singles chart; "The Night You Murdered Love" peaked at No. 31; "King Without a Crown" at No. 44.

In 2005, a digitally remastered CD of the album was released with six bonus tracks.

== Background ==
In a 1987 interview with Record Mirror, Fry said of the album, "It's a record where we sort of caught up with ourselves. For a while we were making records that just seemed to confuse people. It was necessary for us to work from a firm foundation and in a way, we figured Alphabet City might be the last record we ever made anyway, for a lot of reasons. So we figured, let's just make it a statement of our work that drew on all the other records we've made."

== Track listing ==
All tracks are written by Martin Fry and Mark White, except where noted.

Side one
No.	Title	Writer(s)	Length
1.	"Avenue A"	Mark White; Anne Dudley	0:56
2.	"When Smokey Sings"		4:22
3.	"The Night You Murdered Love"		4:53
4.	"Think Again"		3:41
5.	"Rage and Then Regret"		3:34
6.	"Ark-Angel"		4:54

Side two
No.	Title	Writer(s)	Length
7.	"King Without a Crown"		4:41
8.	"Bad Blood"		3:56
9.	"Jealous Lover"		3:36
10.	"One Day"		5:35
11.	"Avenue Z"	White; Dudley	0:42
Total length:			40:55

Additional tracks on initial CD pressing
No.	Title	Writer(s)	Length
12.	"Minneapolis"	White; Bernard Edwards	2:57
13.	"When Smokey Sings" (The Miami Mix)		7:05
14.	"The Night You Murdered Love" (The Whole Story)		8:16
15.	"Chicago" (Abridged)	White; Edwards	3:42

Additional tracks on 2005 version
No.	Title	Writer(s)	Length
12.	"Minneapolis"	White; Edwards	2:57
13.	"Chicago" (Abridged)	White; Edwards	3:42
14.	"24 Carat Plastic"		3:34
15.	"The Night You Murdered Love" (The Reply with Contessa Lady V)	Martin Fry; White; Vaughan Arnell; Anthea Benton	4:50
16.	"One Day" (Instrumental with Real Strings)		5:47
17.	"King Without a Crown" (Monarchy Mix)		8:46

== Personnel ==
ABC

- Martin Fry – lead and backing vocals
- Mark White – keyboards, programming, guitars

Additional personnel

- David Clayton – keyboards
- Brad Lang – bass guitar
- Danny Thompson – double bass
- Graham Broad – drums
- Pandit Dinesh – percussion, tabla
- Luís Jardim (misspelled as "Louis Jardin" on album notes) – percussion
- Howie Casey – saxophones
- Judd Lander – harmonica
- Richard Niles – string arrangements on "When Smokey Sings" and "The Night You Murdered Love"
- Anne Dudley – string arrangements on "One Day" and "Bad Blood"
- Alan Carvell – backing vocals
- Dolette McDonald – backing vocals
- Tessa Niles – backing vocals
- Miriam Stockley – backing vocals
- Linda Taylor – backing vocals

== Production ==
- Martin Fry – producer
- Mark White – producer
- Bernard Edwards – producer
- Martyn Webber – engineer
- Tim Burrell – assistant engineer
- Julian Mendelsohn – mixing
- Ian Cooper – mastering at the Townhouse Studios (London, UK)
- Andy Earl – photography
- Keith Breeden – artwork
- Peter Curzon – artwork
- Paul Bower – manager

== Charts ==
Chart performance for Alphabet City
Chart (1987)	Peak position
Australian Albums (Australian Music Report)	45
Canada Top Albums/CDs (RPM)	47
Dutch Albums (Album Top 100)	19
European Albums (Music & Media)	22
German Albums (Offizielle Top 100)	20
Icelandic Albums (Tónlist)	4
Italian Albums (Musica e dischi)	22
Japanese Albums (Oricon)	82
New Zealand Albums (RMNZ)	25
Swiss Albums (Schweizer Hitparade)	26
UK Albums (Official Charts)	7
US Billboard 200	48

== Certifications ==
Certifications for Alphabet City
Region	Certification	Certified units/sales
Canada (Music Canada)	Gold	50,000^{^}
United Kingdom (BPI)	Gold	100,000^{^}
^{^} Shipments figures based on certification alone.
