= When Smokey Sings =

1987 single by ABC

Single by ABC

from the album Alphabet City
- B-side: "Chicago"
- Released: 25 May 1987
- Studio: Marcus (London, England)
- Genre: Blue-eyed soul; new wave
- Length: 4:22
- Label: Neutron; Mercury
- Songwriters: Martin Fry; Mark White
- Producers: Martin Fry; Mark White; Bernard Edwards

ABC singles chronology
"Ocean Blue" (1986)	"When Smokey Sings" (1987)	"The Night You Murdered Love" (1987)

Music video
- "When Smokey Sings" on YouTube

"When Smokey Sings" is a song by the English pop band ABC, released as the first single from their fourth studio album Alphabet City (1987). The lyrics and title of the song are a tribute to R&B and soul singer Smokey Robinson. In the United States, Robinson's single "One Heartbeat" and ABC's "When Smokey Sings" were ranked in the Billboard 100 pop chart simultaneously for several weeks, including the week ending 3 October 1987, in which both songs ranked in the top 10.

== Background ==
"When Smokey Sings" and its B-side "Chicago" also topped the Billboard Hot Dance Club Play chart. The song reached No. 11 on the UK Singles Chart and became ABC's second American top-10 hit, peaking at No. 5 on the Billboard Hot 100. There is a slight difference in the lyrics between the album and single version in the bridge of the song.

The album version contains references to "Luther," "Sly," "James" and "Marvin" (most likely referring to Luther Vandross, Sly Stone, James Brown and Marvin Gaye, respectively). In the single version, this is replaced by alternative lyrics, followed by a short saxophone solo.

The bassline of the song is an homage to Robinson's 1970 hit single with the Miracles "The Tears of a Clown." Robinson praised the song, saying, "Well, of course, that's a form of flattery, and I really appreciate it."

== Critical reception ==
Barry McIlheney of Smash Hits was critical of "When Smokey Sings", stating that "this isn't half as good as any of their older stuff" and that Smokey Robinson, to whom it was a tribute, "deserves a lot better than this".

== Track listings ==
7-inch single

A. "When Smokey Sings"
B. "Chicago" (part one)

UK, European, and Australian 12-inch single

A. "When Smokey Sings" (the Miami mix) – 7:02
B. "Chicago" (parts one and two) – 6:38

UK 12-inch remix single

A1. "When Smokey Sings" (the Detroit mix)
B1. "When Smokey Sings" (bonus beats)
B2. "Chicago" (part one)
B3. "When Smokey Sings"

UK CD single

1. "When Smokey Sings" (7-inch) – 4:21
2. "All of My Heart" (live from Boston Metro, 17 December 1982) – 6:48
3. "Chicago" – 1:45
4. "When Smokey Sings" (the Miami mix) – 7:02

US 12-inch and maxi-cassette single

A1. "When Smokey Sings" (the Miami mix) – 7:02
A2. "Chicago" (parts one and two) – 6:38
B1. "When Smokey Sings" (7-inch version) – 4:21
B2. "When Smokey Sings" (bonus beats) – 4:38
B3. "When Smokey Sings" (the Detroit mix) – 6:47

Canadian 12-inch single

A1. "When Smokey Sings" (the Miami mix) – 7:02
B1. "When Smokey Sings" (the Detroit mix) – 6:47
B2. "Chicago" (parts one and two) – 6:38

Canadian cassette single

A1. "When Smokey Sings" (the Miami mix) – 7:02
A2. "When Smokey Sings" (bonus beats) – 4:38
B1. "When Smokey Sings" (the Detroit mix) – 6:47
B2. "Chicago" (parts one and two) – 6:38

== Charts ==
=== Weekly charts ===
Chart (1987)	Peak position
Australia (Australian Music Report)	25
Belgium (Ultratop 50 Flanders)	12
Canada Retail Singles (The Record)	2
Canada Top Singles (RPM)	5
Europe (European Hot 100 Singles)	18
Ireland (IRMA)	11
Italy Airplay (Music & Media)	8
Netherlands (Dutch Top 40)	11
Netherlands (Single Top 100)	13
New Zealand (Recorded Music NZ)	9
Quebec (ADISQ)	3
South Africa (Springbok Radio)	20
UK Singles (Official Charts)	11
US Billboard Hot 100	5
US 12-inch Singles Sales (Billboard) with "Chicago"	8
US Adult Contemporary (Billboard)	2
US Dance/Disco Club Play (Billboard) with "Chicago"	1
West Germany (GfK)	52

=== Year-end charts ===
Chart (1987)	Position
Belgium (Ultratop 50 Flanders)	98
Canada Top Singles (RPM)	47
US Billboard Hot 100	70
