= The Look of Love (ABC song) =

1982 single by ABC

Single by ABC

from the album The Lexicon of Love
- B-side: "The Look of Love (Part Two)"
- Released: 7 May 1982
- Genre: Synth-pop; new wave; dance-pop; new pop
- Length: 3:26
- Label: Neutron; Mercury
- Songwriters: Martin Fry; Mark White; Stephen Singleton; David Palmer; Mark Lickley
- Producer: Trevor Horn

ABC singles chronology
"Poison Arrow" (1982)	"The Look of Love" (1982)	"All of My Heart" (1982)

Music video
- "The Look of Love" on YouTube

"The Look of Love" is a song by the English pop band ABC, released in 1982 as the third single from their debut studio album, The Lexicon of Love (1982). It was the band's highest-charting hit in the UK, peaking at No. 4 on the UK Singles Chart. The single also went to No. 1 on the US Billboard Dance/Disco chart as well as the Canadian Singles Chart. On the American Cash Box Top 100, it got as high as No. 9, and on the Billboard Hot 100 it peaked at No. 18.

== History ==
Released as a single and as a 12-inch remix, it consists of four parts, referred to as "Parts One, Two, Three and Four". Part One is the standard album version, Part Two is an instrumental version, Part Three is a vocal version without the orchestral overdubs and Part Four is a short acoustic instrumental part of the song, containing strings and horns, as well as occasional harp plucks and xylophone. A different US remix dub version by producer Trevor Horn appeared as A-side on the 1982 US 12-inch.

The '82 US remix dub version was not widely available after its initial release, but the track remained much in demand by club DJs and fans alike and copies of the original 12-inch version fetched high prices. When Neutron (the band's UK label) discovered this, they issued a limited edition DJ-pressing of the Horn remix in November 1982 as a DJ promo 12-inch vinyl under the title "ABC Look of Love Special Remix 12" Neutron NTXDJ103.

Through the 1980s, BBC Radio 1 DJ Gary Davies used the last crescendo on Part 4 of the song as a closing theme to his daily lunchtime programme called The Bit in the Middle, only changing it in 1991 when his show was rebranded as Let's Do Lunch and given fresh music beds and themes.

The US B-side, entitled "Theme from Mantrap", was an alternate version of "Poison Arrow".

In February 2014, all four parts appeared together as one single track (running 12:29) on the ZTT compilation The Art of the 12", Volume Three.

The lyrics of the song, as well as others on The Lexicon of Love, were inspired by a break-up lead vocalist Martin Fry had experienced. In the second verse, during the phrase "When your girl has left you out on the pavement", the "Goodbye" background vocal is spoken by the actual woman in the relationship who had jilted him.

== Video ==
The video is a studio recreation of an Edwardian park tableau. Various amusing events occur during the performance of the song. It features cameos by Paul Morley, music journalist and later co-founder of ZTT Records, and Trevor Horn, the record's producer.

=== UK chart performance and sales ===
"The Look of Love" spent eleven weeks on the UK Singles Chart, peaking at No. 4 for two weeks in June 1982, making it their highest-charting single in the UK. According to the Official Charts Company it was the UK's 29th best-selling single of 1982. In early 1983 it re-entered the chart for another three weeks, extending the chart run to a total of 14 weeks.

=== Personnel ===
Credits sourced from Sound on Sound, Red Bull Music Academy and the original album liner notes.

ABC

- Martin Fry – lead and backing vocals
- Mark White – backing vocals, electric guitar, piano, Minimoog bass
- Stephen Singleton – saxophone
- Mark Lickley – bass guitar
- David Palmer – drums, Linn LM-1 programming, percussion

Additional Musicians

- Trevor Horn – backing vocals
- Anne Dudley – orchestrations
- J.J. Jeczalik – Fairlight CMI programming
- John Thirkell – trumpet, flugelhorn
- Gaynor Sadler – harp
- Unknown (Martin Fry's ex-girlfriend) – "goodbye" vocal

== Accolades ==
Year	Publisher	Country	Accolade	Rank
1982	NME	United Kingdom	"Singles of the Year" (50)	5
1982	Sounds	United Kingdom	"Singles of the Year" (20)	18
1982	The Village Voice	United States	"Pazz & Jop Critics' Poll: Top 10 Singles"	9
2003	Paul Morley	United Kingdom	"Greatest Pop Single of All Time"	*
2005	Q	United Kingdom	"Ultimate Music Collection" (Pop Tracks)	*
2006	VH1	United States	"100 Greatest Songs of the 80's"	43
2009	The Guardian	United Kingdom	"1000 Songs Everyone Must Hear" (Love)	*
2010	Pause & Play	United States	"Vault of Fame" (Songs)	*
2011	NME	United Kingdom	"75 Tunes That Defined Rock 'N' Roll" (Deep Cuts)	*
2011	Robert Dimery	United Kingdom	"1001 Songs You Must Hear Before You Die"	*
???	The Village Voice	United States	"Top Singles of the 80's" (100)	59

(*) indicates the list is unordered.

== Charts ==
=== Weekly charts ===
Chart (1982)	Peak position
Australia (Kent Music Report)	7
Belgium (Ultratop 50 Flanders)	16
Canada Top Singles (RPM)	1
Finland (Suomen virallinen lista)	4
Ireland (IRMA)	12
Netherlands (Dutch Top 40)	12
Netherlands (Single Top 100)	11
New Zealand (Recorded Music NZ)	5
Spain (AFYVE)	15
Sweden (Sverigetopplistan)	8
UK Singles (Official Charts)	4
US Billboard Hot 100	18
US Dance/Disco Top 80 (Billboard)	1
US Rock Top Tracks (Billboard)	32
US Cash Box Top 100	9
West Germany (GfK)	36

=== Year-end charts ===
Chart (1982)	Rank
Australia (Kent Music Report)	69
Canada Top Singles (RPM)	17
New Zealand (RIANZ)	28
US Cash Box	65

== Certifications ==
Region	Certification	Certified units/sales
Canada (Music Canada)	Gold	50,000^{^}
United Kingdom (BPI)	Gold	400,000^{‡}
^{^} Shipments figures based on certification alone.^{‡} Sales+streaming figures based on certification alone.

== The Look of Love (1990 Mix) ==
"The Look of Love (1990 Mix)"

Single by ABC

from the album Absolutely
- Released: 26 March 1990
- Length: 4:01
- Label: Mercury; Phonogram
- Songwriters: Martin Fry; Mark White; Stephen Singleton; David Palmer; Mark Lickley
- Producer: Trevor Horn

ABC singles chronology
"The Real Thing" (1989)	"The Look of Love (1990 Mix)" (1990)	"Love Conquers All" (1991)

In 1990, to promote the compilation album Absolutely, a new remix of the song by Paul Staveley O'Duffy was officially released, though without participation or approval from the band's members. The remix incorporates part of the melody from Kraftwerk's "Computer Love", which had been in the UK Top 40 at the same time as the original release of "The Look of Love" in 1982.

=== Charts ===
Chart (1990)	Peak position
Germany (Media Control Charts)	31
Ireland (IRMA)	30
New Zealand (RIANZ)	44
UK Singles (Official Charts)	68

== Eclipse versions ==
In 1996, Australian group, Eclipse released a dance cover version, which reached No. 30 on the Australian charts.

=== Track listing ===
1. "The Look of Love" – 3:24
2. "The Look of Love" (Extended Mix) – 6:41
3. "The Look of Love" (Unity Mix) – 5:30
4. "The Look of Love" (Bass Of Love Mix) – 5:00
5. "Saviour" (Colombian Mix) – 4:10
6. "Saviour" (Stockholm Mix) – 5:03

=== Charts ===
Chart (1996)	Peak position
Australia (ARIA)	30

== See also ==
- List of number-one dance singles of 1982 (U.S.)
- List of number-one singles of 1982 (Canada)
