= How to Be a ... Zillionaire! =

Studio album by ABC
- Released: 4 October 1985
- Recorded: 1984–1985
- Studio: Jacobs Studios (Farnham, Surrey)
- Genres: Disco; electropop
- Length: 37:52
- Labels: Neutron (UK); Mercury (US); Vertigo (Canada)
- Producers: Mark White; Martin Fry

ABC chronology
Beauty Stab (1983)	How to Be a ... Zillionaire! (1985)	Alphabet City (1987)

Alternative covers
- Original CD artwork

Singles from How to Be a ... Zillionaire!
- 1. "(How to Be A) Millionaire" Released: 2 November 1984; 2. "Be Near Me" Released: 29 March 1985; 3. "Vanity Kills" Released: 31 May 1985; 4. "Ocean Blue" Released: 3 January 1986

Professional ratings
Review scores
Source	Rating
AllMusic	4.5/5 stars
The Encyclopedia of Popular Music	3/5 stars
Record Mirror	3.5/5 stars
The Rolling Stone Album Guide	2/5 stars
Smash Hits	8/10
The Village Voice	B−

How to Be a ... Zillionaire! is the third studio album by English pop band ABC. It was originally released in October 1985, on the labels Neutron, Mercury and Vertigo. The album peaked at No. 28 on the UK Albums Chart and at No. 30 on the Billboard 200.

Four singles were released from the album, "(How to Be A) Millionaire" (UK singles chart: No. 49; Billboard Hot 100: No. 20), "Be Near Me" (UK: No. 26; US: No. 9), "Vanity Kills" (UK: No. 74; US: No. 91), and "Ocean Blue", (UK: No. 54). It is the group's only album to feature founder members Martin Fry and Mark White flanked by new members Eden and David Yarritu, the latter two credited merely as "performers" with effectively no or limited musical contribution to the album.

In 2005, a digitally remastered CD of the album was released with eight bonus tracks.

== Track listing ==
All tracks are written by Martin Fry and Mark White.

Side one
No.	Title	Length
1.	"Fear of the World"	3:50
2.	"Be Near Me"	3:37
3.	"Vanity Kills"	3:28
4.	"Ocean Blue"	3:36
5.	"15 Storey Halo"	5:36

Side two
No.	Title	Length
6.	"A to Z"	2:49
7.	"(How to Be A) Millionaire"	3:34
8.	"Tower of London"	3:36
9.	"So Hip It Hurts"	4:17
10.	"Between You and Me"	3:16
Total length:		37:52

Additional tracks on initial CD pressing
No.	Title	Length
11.	"Fear of the World" (In CinemaScope)	4:40
12.	"Be Near Me" (Munich Disco mix)	5:27
13.	"(How to Be a) Zillionaire" (Bond Street mix of "(How to Be a) Millionaire")	6:05
14.	"Vanity Kills" (The Abigail's Party mix)	5:08

Additional tracks on 2005 version
No.	Title	Length
11.	"(How to Be a) Trillionaire" (Harajuku mix of "(How to Be a) Millionaire")	3:38
12.	"What's Your Destination?" (B-side to UK version of "Be Near Me" single)	3:38
13.	"Vanity Kills" (USA remix)	5:40
14.	"Vanity Kills" (The Abigail's Party mix)	5:08
15.	"Ocean Blue" (Pacific Mix)	3:40
16.	"Judy's Jewels" (B-side to "Vanity Kills" single)	2:03
17.	"Fear of the World" (in CinemaScope)	4:40
18.	"Tower of London" (instrumental version)	3:38

== Personnel ==
Credits adapted from the original album liner notes.

ABC

- Martin Fry – lead and backing vocals
- Mark White – E-mu Emulator II, Fairlight CMI programming
- Fiona Russell Powell (a.k.a. Eden) – vocals, record scratching
- David Yarritu – spoken voice

Additional personnel

- Gary Moberley – Fairlight CMI programming
- Don Snow – acoustic piano, Yamaha DX7, synthesizers
- Skip McDonald – guitars on "Tower of London"
- David Williams – guitars on "(How to Be a) Millionaire"
- Brad Lang – bass guitar
- Keith LeBlanc – drums, rhythm beatbox programming
- David Palmer – hi-hat
- Chris Whitten – additional drums on "15 Storey Halo"
- Guy Barker – trumpet on "Vanity Kills"
- Alan Carvell – backing vocals
- Jackie Challenor – backing vocals
- Lorenza Johnson – backing vocals
- Mae McKenna – backing vocals
- P. P. Arnold – tertiary backing vocals on "Ocean Blue"

Production

- Mark White – producer
- Martin Fry – producer
- Martyn Webster – chief engineer
- Julian Mendelsohn – mixing, second engineer
- Paul Corkett – assistant engineer
- Mike Drake – assistant engineer
- Charles Harrowell – assistant engineer
- Heff Moraes – assistant engineer
- Dietmar Schillinger – assistant engineer
- Mark Stent – assistant engineer
- Paul Wright – assistant engineer
- Ian Cooper – analogue mastering engineer
- Daryl Easlea – digital pre-mastering, album sequencing
- Gary Moore – digital mastering engineer
- Nick Knight – photography
- Keith Breeden at Design KB – art direction
- Alan Best – animation art
- Ted Hall – animation art
- Peter Care – dialogue and photo modelling director

== Charts ==
=== Weekly charts ===
Weekly chart performance for How to Be a ... Zillionaire!
Chart (1985–86)	Peak position
Canada Top Albums/CDs (RPM)	36
European Albums (Music & Media)	48
German Albums (Offizielle Top 100)	58
UK Albums (Official Charts)	28
US Billboard 200	30

=== Year-end charts ===
Year-end chart performance for How to Be a ... Zillionaire!
Chart (1986)	Position
US Billboard 200	48
