= Abracadabra (ABC album) =

Studio album by ABC
- Released: 12 August 1991
- Recorded: 1990–1991
- Genres: Dance-pop; alternative dance; blue-eyed soul; house
- Labels: EMI; MCA
- Producers: Martin Fry; Mark White; Dave Bascombe

ABC chronology
Absolutely (1990)	Abracadabra (1991)	Skyscraping (1997)

Singles from Abracadabra
- 1. "Love Conquers All" Released: 15 July 1991; 2. "Say It" Released: 30 December 1991

Abracadabra is the sixth studio album by the English band ABC. It was originally released in August 1991, on the label EMI. It was the final ABC album to feature founding member Mark White, who departed the band in 1992.

ABC moved to the EMI label, where they recorded the album Abracadabra, a tightly produced fusion of early 1990s techno sounds and 1970s dance grooves which was met with muted critical approval and appreciation from the band's fan base.

The first single, "Love Conquers All", peaked at No. 47 on the UK Singles Chart and remixes of "Say It" (done by Black Box) were well received on the US dance charts.

== Background ==
In a 1997 interview, ABC's lead singer Martin Fry said of the album, "Went round in circles making this. Started in the U.S. in Detroit, Chicago and New York City. Scrapped a lot of music to get to the finished record. Finished it at the Townhouse, Shepherd's Bush. A low."

In a 2004 appearance on VH1's Bands Reunited, Fry said of White's departure: "We signed this big record deal with EMI in Europe and the level of expectation was so high. You felt it every day. And we made a record, and midway through it Mark just says 'I can't do it any more, I've had enough'. And I said to him 'you should persist, you know, let's finish the record'. And at that point he just said 'look I quit, I've had enough, I don't want to do it any more'."

In a 2006 interview, Fry spoke of the album, saying: "We got a massive deal with EMI, but, by then, the group had really burned out .... Some of the record worked. 'Love Conquers All,' and 'Spellbound,' with Phil Manzanera (from Roxy Music), worked. There's some moments on it. What can I say? I'm very critical, very critical."

In a 2009 interview, Fry summed up each ABC album, and said of Abracadabra that it was "A hybrid of different genres, it's idealistic really. You can hear the civil war internally as our lucrative opportunity to make the album of our career slithered through our hands. We perfected the music and atmosphere that became the record, yet the process was indirectly intense."

== Critical reception ==
Professional ratings
Review scores
Source	Rating
AllMusic	2/5 stars
The Encyclopedia of Popular Music	2/5 stars
NME	7/10

Upon its release, Betty Page of NME noted the album finds ABC "on the mellow tip, producing the sort of smooth, liquid sound that they'd have killed for in those early, faltering days". She noted that "at times it almost touches on the languidity of late Roxy Music" and there's a "quietly confident maturity about this record that makes it wash over you in warm waves". She concluded, "There's nothing cutting-edge about ABC here, but Abracadabra has a soothing, reflective quality which oozes contentedness." Paul Lester of Melody Maker felt the album "exposes an even deeper love for black American funk and soul" than ABC's previous work, with many of the songs either "borrow[ing] liberally from, or are faithful reconstructions of, essential late Seventies/early Eighties dancehall memories". He felt that ABC "lovingly recreate some of the genre's finest moments" on the album and also noted the "lavish production techniques and exquisite details". He warned that some may find Fry's "occasionally hackneyed lyrical devices hard to take" and added, "Certainly the LP's more drippy moon-June couplets and corny elemental imagery rankle, not least because this was the crooner who once subverted every known cliché in The Lexicon Of Love."

In the US, Billboard described the "lushly produced" album as one which is focused on "state-of-the-charts dance grooves". They praised Fry's "reliably theatrical vocals" and felt that "Club DJs will heartily devour this delicious set". Richard Riccio of the St. Petersburg Times felt that Abracadabra "brings the band full circle, a ride around a six-album arc that has never once been unpleasant and demonstrates why this band is one of the most durable members of the Second British Invasion". Tom Nixon of The Michigan Daily believed most of the album was musically similar to "many of the disco hits of the late 1970s". Although he felt that most of the album's songs had "little individuality", and probably used the "same drum machine" and "keyboard arrangement", he noted the "simple, slightly danceable" rhythms and praised the "crisp" production. He concluded, "ABC fans may be disappointed with the band's latest effort".

Stephen Thomas Erlewine of AllMusic retrospectively considered Abracadabra to be a "disheartening latter-day album from ABC". He felt that they had tried to sound modern by "incorporating both house and smooth Philly soul flourishes to their sound" and, although sometimes the results were "supple and alluring", he felt the album lacked "strong, melodic songs". Peter Buckley, writing in his 2003 book The Rough Guide to Rock, felt that the album was a "half-hearted attempt to reheat the tried and tested formula created and perfected a decade earlier". In the 2003 book The Rough Guide to Cult Pop, author Paul Simpson stated, "Abracadabra probably won't reach out and grab ya".

== Track listing ==
All tracks are written by Martin Fry and Mark White.

Original UK edition
No.	Title	Length
1.	"Love Conquers All"	5:03
2.	"Unlock the Secrets of Your Heart"	4:53
3.	"Answered Prayer"	6:05
4.	"Spellbound"	4:15
5.	"Say It"	4:21
6.	"Welcome to the Real World"	4:02
7.	"Satori"	2:58
8.	"All That Matters"	4:29
9.	"This Must Be Magic"	4:20

US edition
No.	Title	Length
10.	"What's Good About Goodbye"	4:47
11.	"Say It" (Black Box mix)	4:36

2005 digital download
No.	Title	Length
10.	"What's Good About Goodbye"	4:51
11.	"Love Conquers All" (extended version)	6:17
12.	"Say It" (the Black Box mix)	6:20
13.	"Unlock the Secrets of Your Heart" (M People mix)	5:00
14.	"Love Conquers All" (Boilerhouse mix)	4:51
15.	"Love Conquers All" (the Morales Eclipse Mix)	5:45
16.	"Viva Love" (Brothers in Rhythm edit)	4:14
17.	"Snakebite"	4:52
18.	"Kiss Me Goodbye"	5:20

== Personnel ==
ABC

- Martin Fry – lead vocals
- Mark White – keyboards, synthesizers, programming, guitars

Additional musicians

- Marius de Vries – keyboards
- Tony Patler – keyboards
- Matt Rowe – keyboards, programming, backing vocals
- Don Campbell – guitars, drums, backing vocals
- Phil Manzanera – guitars
- Gota Yashiki – drums, percussion, programming
- Steve Sidelynk – drums, percussion
- Phil Smith – saxophones
- Derek Green – backing vocals
- Gina Foster – backing vocals
- Paul Lee – backing vocals
- Zeetah Massiah – backing vocals
- Frankë Pharoah – backing vocals
- Beverley Skeete – backing vocals
- Cleveland Watkiss – backing vocals

== Production ==
- Martin Fry – producer
- Mark White – producer
- Dave Bascombe – producer (1–9, 11), engineer (1–9, 11), mixing (1–9, 11)
- Andy Falconer – engineer (10)
- Phil Bodger – mixing (10)
- Richard Arnold – assistant engineer (1–9, 11), mix assistant (1–9, 11)
- Black Box – remixing (11)
- Area – sleeve design
- Lewis Mulatero – photography
- Bennett Freed – management

== Charts ==
Chart performance for Abracadabra
Chart (1991)	Peak position
Austrian Albums (Ö3 Austria)	39
European Albums (Music & Media)	65
German Albums (Offizielle Top 100)	22
UK Albums (Official Charts)	50
