= All of My Heart =

Single by ABC

from the album The Lexicon of Love
- B-side: "Overture"
- Released: 27 August 1982
- Genre: Synth-pop; new pop
- Length: 5:12
- Label: Neutron; Mercury; Vertigo; Philips
- Songwriters: Martin Fry; Mark White; Stephen Singleton; David Palmer
- Producer: Trevor Horn

ABC singles chronology
"The Look of Love" (1982)	"All of My Heart" (1982)	"That Was Then but This Is Now" (1983)

Music video
- "All of My Heart" on YouTube

"All of My Heart" is a song by the English pop band ABC, from their debut studio album, The Lexicon of Love (1982). It was released as a single in the UK on 27 August 1982 and peaked at No. 5 on the UK Singles Chart. The B-side, "Overture", was an instrumental, orchestral medley of songs from The Lexicon of Love, arranged by Anne Dudley.

== Critical reception ==
In a retrospective review of the song, AllMusic critic Mike DeGagne wrote: "The lushness of the instruments and the small amounts of musical detail drape the body of the track, adding a slight classical feel to the song's flow."

In 2005, Jess Harvell of Pitchfork listed "All of My Heart" as his favorite UK song of the post-punk "new pop" era, describing it as "ABC's slickest and most gorgeous single, and yet also possibly their most bitter." Harvell wrote: "Martin Fry alternates between open hearted and suspicious, warm and resentful with the turn of a phrase. The outro–a swirl of soundtrack strings, plucked bass, and cascading piano–is the most purely beautiful music of the era."

== Track listing ==
1. "All of My Heart" – 4:45
2. "Overture" – 3:56

== Personnel ==
Credits sourced from Sound on Sound and the original album liner notes.

ABC

- Martin Fry – lead and backing vocals
- Mark White – electric guitar, synthesizers
- Stephen Singleton – saxophone
- David Palmer – drums

Additional musicians

- Anne Dudley – piano, Fender Rhodes electric piano, Wurlitzer electric piano, orchestration
- J.J. Jeczalik – Fairlight CMI programming
- Brad Lang – bass guitar

== Chart performance ==
Chart	Position
Australia (Kent Music Report)	21
Belgium (Ultratop 50 Flanders)	10
Canada Top Singles (RPM)	13
Germany (GfK)	67
Ireland (IRMA)	3
Netherlands (Dutch Top 40)	20
New Zealand (Recorded Music NZ)	21
UK Singles Chart	5
