= Poison Arrow =

Single by ABC

from the album The Lexicon of Love
- B-side: "Theme from Mantrap" (UK); "Tears Are Not Enough" (US)
- Released: 15 February 1982 (UK) / 11 January 1983 (US)
- Recorded: 1981
- Genre: Disco; dance-pop; new pop; orchestral pop; lounge
- Length: 3:24
- Label: Neutron; Mercury; Vertigo
- Songwriters: Martin Fry; Mark White; Stephen Singleton; David Palmer; Mark Lickley
- Producer: Trevor Horn

ABC singles chronology
"Tears Are Not Enough" (1981)	"Poison Arrow" (1982)	"The Look of Love" (1982)

Music video
- "Poison Arrow" on YouTube

"Poison Arrow" is a song by the English pop band ABC, released as the second single from their debut studio album, The Lexicon of Love (1982). It reached No. 6 on the UK singles chart. In the United States, it peaked at No. 24 on the Cashbox and No. 25 in Billboard Hot 100 charts.

The single was released in the United Kingdom on 15 February 1982 on 7" and 12", with the same mix appearing on both formats; however a subsequent US 12" remix (also known as the "Jazz Remix") appears on several ABC compilations, and as a bonus track on reissues of The Lexicon of Love.

An alternate, lounge music styled version of this song, entitled "Theme from Mantrap", was released as the B-side of "Poison Arrow" in the United Kingdom, and "The Look of Love" in the United States. The 12" single in the United Kingdom additionally included an instrumental version of "Theme from Mantrap" under the title "Mantrap (The Lounge Sequence)". The band's first hit in the United Kingdom "Tears Are Not Enough" was the B-side of "Poison Arrow" in the United States.

== Music video ==
In the music video, ABC's lead vocalist Martin Fry plays three parts: a haughty upper-class opera patron; a messenger boy at the opera; and a bandleader at a 1960s-style swinging nightspot. In all three roles, he unsuccessfully attempts to woo the leading lady, played by the television personality and actress Lisa Vanderpump, later of The Real Housewives of Beverly Hills and Vanderpump Rules.

== Personnel ==
Credits sourced from Sound on Sound and the original album liner notes.

ABC

- Martin Fry – lead and backing vocals
- Mark White – electric guitars, piano, synthesizers
- Stephen Singleton – saxophone
- Mark Lickley – bass guitar
- David Palmer – drums, congas

Additional musicians

- Trevor Horn – Minimoog bass, Roland TR-808 programming, Roland MC-4 Microcomposer sequencer
- J. J. Jeczalik – Fairlight CMI programming
- John Thirkell – trumpet, flugelhorn
- Karen Clayton – spoken voice

== Chart performance ==
=== Weekly charts ===
Chart (1982–1983)	Peak position
Australia (Kent Music Report)	4
Belgium (Ultratop 50 Flanders)	19
Ireland (IRMA)	14
Netherlands (Single Top 100)	18
New Zealand (Recorded Music NZ)	5
UK Singles (OCC)	6
US Billboard Hot 100	25
US Billboard Hot Dance Club Play	39

=== Year-end charts ===
Chart (1982)	Peak position
Australia (Kent Music Report)	31

== In popular culture ==
- The song was featured in an early 1983 episode of the US television soap opera The Young and the Restless.
- "Poison Arrow" was used in the action-adventure game Grand Theft Auto: Vice City (2002) on the fictional radio station Wave 103.
- In February 1998, the song was featured in an episode of motoring magazine programme Top Gear, in which scenes of the Vauxhall Astra is being driven, with a voice over by presenter Jeremy Clarkson.
- The song was featured as the title credits song for the BBC sitcom White Gold in the episode "The Past Does Not Equal the Future".
- The song was featured in the Nine Network program Footy Classified, where it is used to introduce the segment "Caro's Arrow". The segment involves Caroline Wilson delivering a monologue where she targets high-profile issues and personalities in the Australian Football League (AFL). This segment ended after 2024 with Wilson's departure.
