= ABC (band) =

English pop band

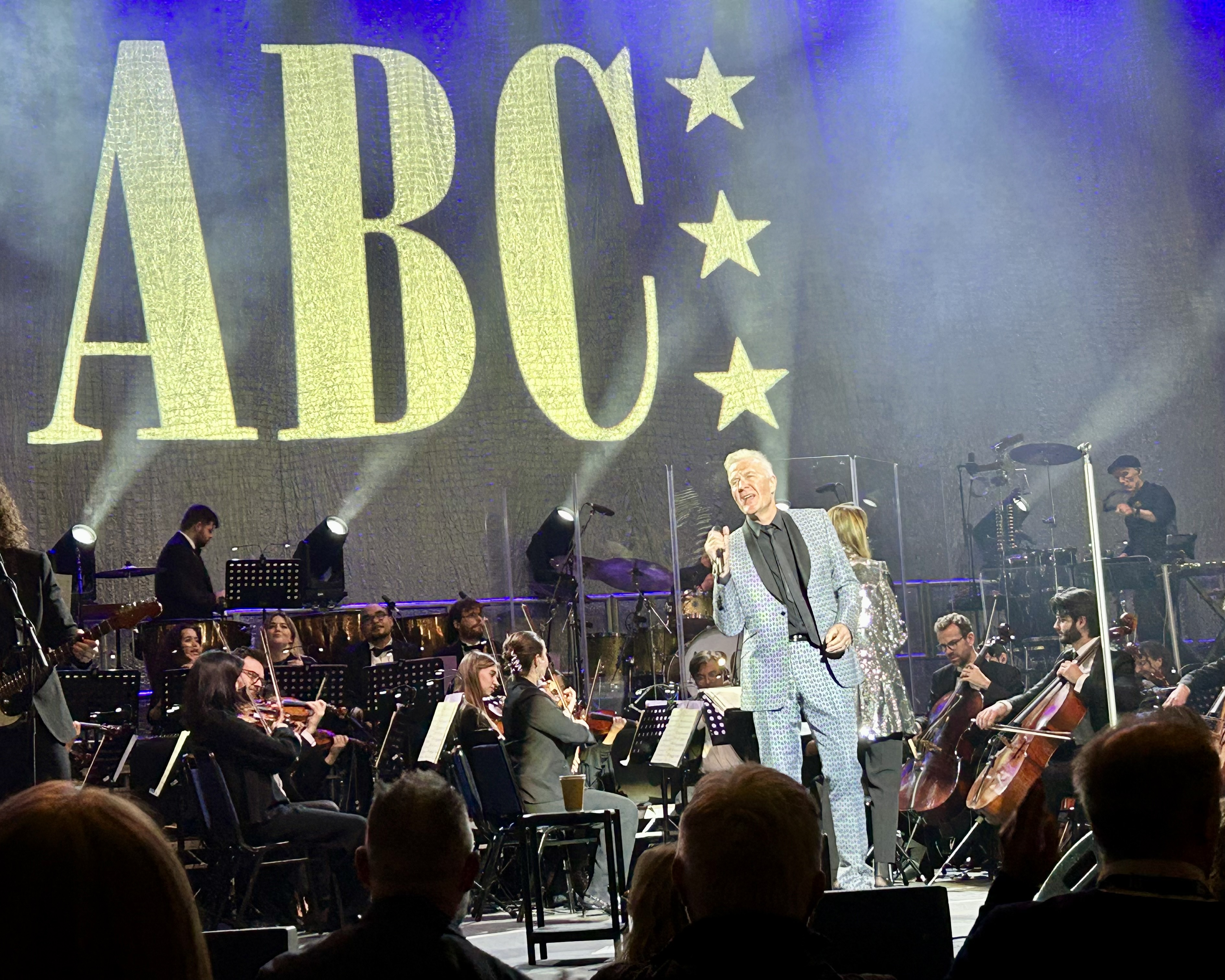
- ABC performing at the O_{2} Apollo Manchester, 2025

Background information
- Origin: Sheffield, South Yorkshire, England
- Genres: Pop; new wave; synth-pop; new pop
- Years active: 1980–present
- Labels: Neutron; Mercury; Vertigo; Phonogram; PolyGram; Parlophone; MCA; Philips; Blatant; Deconstruction; Universal; Borough Music; Virgin EMI; Live Here Now
- Spinoff of: Vice Versa
- Members: Martin Fry
- Past members: Stephen Singleton; Mark White; Mark Lickley; David Robinson; David Palmer; Fiona Russell Powell; David Yarritu
- Website: abcmartinfry.com

ABC are an English pop band which formed in Sheffield, South Yorkshire in 1980, evolving from the earlier electronic band Vice Versa. Associated with the new pop movement of the early 1980s, ABC blended synth-pop with disco and rock influences. The band achieved mainstream success with their debut album, The Lexicon of Love (1982), which reached number one on the UK Albums Chart and featured the hit singles "Tears Are Not Enough", "Poison Arrow", "All of My Heart" and "The Look of Love".

Fronted by lead vocalist Martin Fry, the band's only constant member, their classic line-up featured Fry, guitarist and keyboardist Mark White, saxophonist Stephen Singleton, and drummer David Palmer. ABC achieved ten UK and five US top 40 hit singles from 1981 to 1990. The band's early-1980s success in the US made them part of the Second British Invasion. Following The Lexicon of Love, ABC continued to release music throughout the 1980s, with notable albums including Beauty Stab (1983), which included the hit single "That Was Then but This Is Now", How to Be a ... Zillionaire! (1985), which included the hit singles "(How to Be A) Millionaire" and "Be Near Me", and Alphabet City (1987), which included the hit singles "When Smokey Sings" and "The Night You Murdered Love".

Although their commercial success declined after the 1980s, ABC have remained active through live performances, reissues, and occasional new material. In 2016, Fry released The Lexicon of Love II, a sequel to their debut studio album, which was well received by both critics and fans.

== History ==
=== Formation ===
ABC have their roots in Vice Versa, a Sheffield electronic band formed in 1977 by synthesiser players Stephen Singleton and Mark White, with the latter on lead vocals. Their debut gig was as an opening act for the post-punk band Wire at the Outlook Club in Doncaster. They founded their own label, Neutron Records, releasing the extended play (EP) Music 4. Martin Fry, who wrote the fanzine Modern Drugs, interviewed Vice Versa and shortly afterwards they asked him to join as synthesizer player. Fry accepted and by late 1980 the band had evolved into ABC, with Fry becoming their lead vocalist. The band's last day as Vice Versa was at the Futurama 2 Festival in Leeds in September 1980; from then on they performed as ABC, with Singleton playing saxophone and White on guitar and keyboards. In the new year, Singleton and White were joined by Mark Lickley on bass guitar and David Robinson on drums.

=== The Lexicon of Love, Beauty Stab and How to Be a ... Zillionaire!: 1981–1985 ===
The band's first single, "Tears Are Not Enough", made the UK top 20 in 1981. Soon afterwards, Robinson left the band and was replaced by David Palmer; Lickley departed shortly thereafter and was not replaced. In June 1982, the band released their debut studio album The Lexicon of Love, which reached number one on the UK Albums Chart. Produced by Trevor Horn, it often featured in UK critics' lists of favourite albums: it ranked 42nd in The Observer Music Monthly's "Top 100 British Albums" (June 2004) and 40th in Q magazine's "100 Greatest British Albums" (June 2000). The band had three top 10 hits during 1982: the singles "Poison Arrow", "The Look of Love" (both of which were recorded whilst Mark Lickley was still a member of the band) and "All of My Heart". Several high concept music videos were made, including the long-form spy pastiche Mantrap by Julien Temple.

Following the culmination of the Lexicon of Love tour, Palmer joined the Yellow Magic Orchestra (YMO) for a series of tour dates; shortly thereafter Fry, White and Singleton decided to reconvene in order to commence work on their next studio album, leading Palmer to depart ABC in order to honour his commitments to Yellow Magic Orchestra's tour. The remaining members found it difficult to follow up on the success of their debut. Their second studio album, Beauty Stab, was released in November 1983, produced by Gary Langan who was the engineer on The Lexicon of Love. It performed poorly in comparison to its predecessor, peaking at No. 12. The first single from the album, "That Was Then but This Is Now", briefly appeared in the UK top 20, followed by a top 40 showing for "S.O.S.". The band eschewed remixes for the project and so the 12" single for "That Was Then but This Is Now" featured the disclaimer "This record is exactly the same as the 7" version. The choice is yours."

Singleton left the band shortly after the release of Beauty Stab as a result of Fry and White's reluctance to spend much time touring the band's material. Fry and White then enlisted the services of Fiona Russell Powell (under the name "Eden") and David Yarritu in the band's new line-up. Powell had been a member of the original line-up of the pre-ABC band, Vice Versa. According to an article published on 7 March 1997, she 'chickened out' of Vice Versa's first live gig, and the job as frontman went to Fry. The Fry-White-Powell-Yarritu line-up recorded the studio album How to Be a ... Zillionaire!, released in October 1985. The band's chart success dwindled further in the UK with this album, but they did score their first US top 10 hit with "Be Near Me", which also made the UK top 30. The album also featured the singles "(How to Be A) Millionaire", "Vanity Kills" and "Ocean Blue". Inspiration for the album's cartoons of the band members was taken from a photo shoot by David Levine whose work featured on many of the sleeves for singles released from this album. Keith LeBlanc later of Tackhead programmed much of the drum machines for the album.

=== Chart success continues with Alphabet City: 1986–1988 ===
After a hiatus, during which Fry was being treated for Hodgkin lymphoma (an uncommon cancer), he and White reconvened ABC as a duo, releasing their fourth studio album Alphabet City in 1987. The album returned them to the UK Top 10 for the first time in five years, peaking at No. 7. It featured "When Smokey Sings", a tribute to the American R&B and soul singer Smokey Robinson, which narrowly missed the UK Top 10. The song did give the duo their biggest hit in the US, where it peaked at number 5 in September. The album also spawned "The Night You Murdered Love" (UK No. 31) and "King Without a Crown" (UK No. 44) as singles.

=== Up, Absolutely and Abracadabra: 1989–1992 ===
In 1989, the duo issued Up, their fifth and final PolyGram studio album. This time experimenting with house music, ABC scored a minor UK hit with the single "One Better World". A second single, "The Real Thing", and the album itself were less successful. During this period, the duo worked on a couple of outside productions aimed at the house music scene. One was Paul Rutherford of Frankie Goes to Hollywood's debut and sole solo studio album, Oh World, and first single release; the other was for Lizzie Tear on the duo's own Neutron label.

In April 1990, the duo released a greatest hits compilation album, Absolutely. This covered all of ABC's studio albums up until 1990 and featured most of their singles. The compilation made the UK Top 10. A video package featuring their music videos was also released. One new song, "The Look of Love '90", was released to promote the package.

The duo moved to the EMI label (and MCA in North America), where they recorded their sixth studio album Abracadabra (1991). Two singles, "Love Conquers All" and "Say It", narrowly missed the UK Top 40, though a remix of the latter by the Italian house music group Black Box appeared on the US Hot Dance Club Play at No. 3. This would be the final ABC studio album to feature founding member Mark White, who departed the duo in 1992.

Martin Fry also collaborated with the dance band M People in 1991 on their debut studio album, Northern Soul, recording vocals for the song "Life". However, when the album was re-released in 1992, and again in 1995, this track was omitted.

=== Skyscraping and comeback: 1997–2007 ===
After a six-year hiatus, ABC reformed as Fry solo, and released their seventh studio album Skyscraping in March 1997, a homage to several of Fry's musical heroes, including David Bowie, Roxy Music and the Sex Pistols. With Glenn Gregory of Heaven 17 and Keith Lowndes contributing to the sessions and songwriting, the album was commercially unsuccessful though a single, "Stranger Things", reached No. 57 in the UK. Two other singles, "Rolling Sevens" and "Skyscraping", did not chart.

In 1999, ABC released their first live album, The Lexicon of Live. The album covered most of their major hits. Although Fry was the only member left, he had a backing band and adorned the album cover in his famed gold lamé suit.

Look of Love: The Very Best of ABC was released in November 2001. Although essentially a reissue of the 1990 greatest hits compilation Absolutely, the album featured two new songs by Fry, "Peace and Tranquility" and "Blame". A companion DVD, along with a bonus disc of remixes, was also released.

In 2004, the VH1 show Bands Reunited attempted to get the band's classic line-up of Fry, White, Singleton and Palmer together for a reunion concert. Fry and Palmer appeared and played together (with help from Nick Beggs of Kajagoogoo) for the first time in over 20 years. Singleton and White opted not to participate.

=== Traffic: 2007–2015 ===
Following a tour of the United States in May and June 2006, Fry and Palmer, together with session keyboardist Chuck Kentis, put together a new ABC studio album, Traffic, released in April 2008. Gary Langan, who had worked on The Lexicon of Love and Beauty Stab, mixed and produced the album. The first single, "The Very First Time", debuted on BBC Radio 2 in January, was added to the station's "A" playlist for the week beginning 29 March and was released as a music download track on 1 April.

On 1 September 2007, ABC performed a set with other 1980s acts at Retrofest at Culzean Castle in Ayrshire, Scotland. This appearance included a rendition of "Addicted to Love", with Tony Hadley of Spandau Ballet and Peter Cox of Go West.

In mid 2008, ABC toured the US as part of the 2008 Regeneration Tour, which also featured the Human League, Belinda Carlisle of the Go-Go's, A Flock of Seagulls and Naked Eyes.

In April 2009, ABC performed The Lexicon of Love studio album live at the Royal Albert Hall, accompanied by the BBC Concert Orchestra. Anne Dudley of Art of Noise, who arranged and played keyboards on the original album, conducted the performance. A music review in the 13 April 2009 edition of The Independent newspaper, described the performance as a "glorious night that has placed one of the Eighties' most perfectly constructed albums back near the top of the pop pantheon".

In 2009, ABC toured the US as the headliner of the 2009 Regeneration Tour, which also featured Terri Nunn of Berlin, Wang Chung and Cutting Crew.

In June, July and August 2011, ABC performed at a few locations around the UK as well as Las Vegas, Nevada. In October 2011, they performed dates in Melbourne, Australia.

On 19 July 2012, Fry was made an honorary Doctor of Music at the University of Sheffield for his contribution to music over more than 30 years. The following day his daughter Nancy received her degree from the Department of Sociological Studies from the same university.

On 1 March 2013, ABC appeared in Dubai, United Arab Emirates (UAE), in the '80s Rewind' concert with Rick Astley, Heaven 17, Howard Jones and T'Pau.

In June 2014, it was revealed that a dozen early master tapes had been discovered of rare remixes and unheard songs from ABC's first three studio albums. These were returned to Martin Fry who was delighted, but unsure as to what he would do with them. According to Classic Pop, the rediscovered songs include "a 'That's It Folks!' mix of 'So Hip It Hurts' from Zillionaire. From Beauty Stab, reams of early studio takes have come to light including one song, 'You and Me', that never made the final album. From The Lexicon of Love era, the band's own, pre-Trevor Horn demos of 'All of My Heart' have come to light, along with a reel entitled '4 Ever 2 Gether – The Outtake, Starring Martin Fry as Ken Dodd'".

=== The Lexicon of Love II: 2016–2021 ===
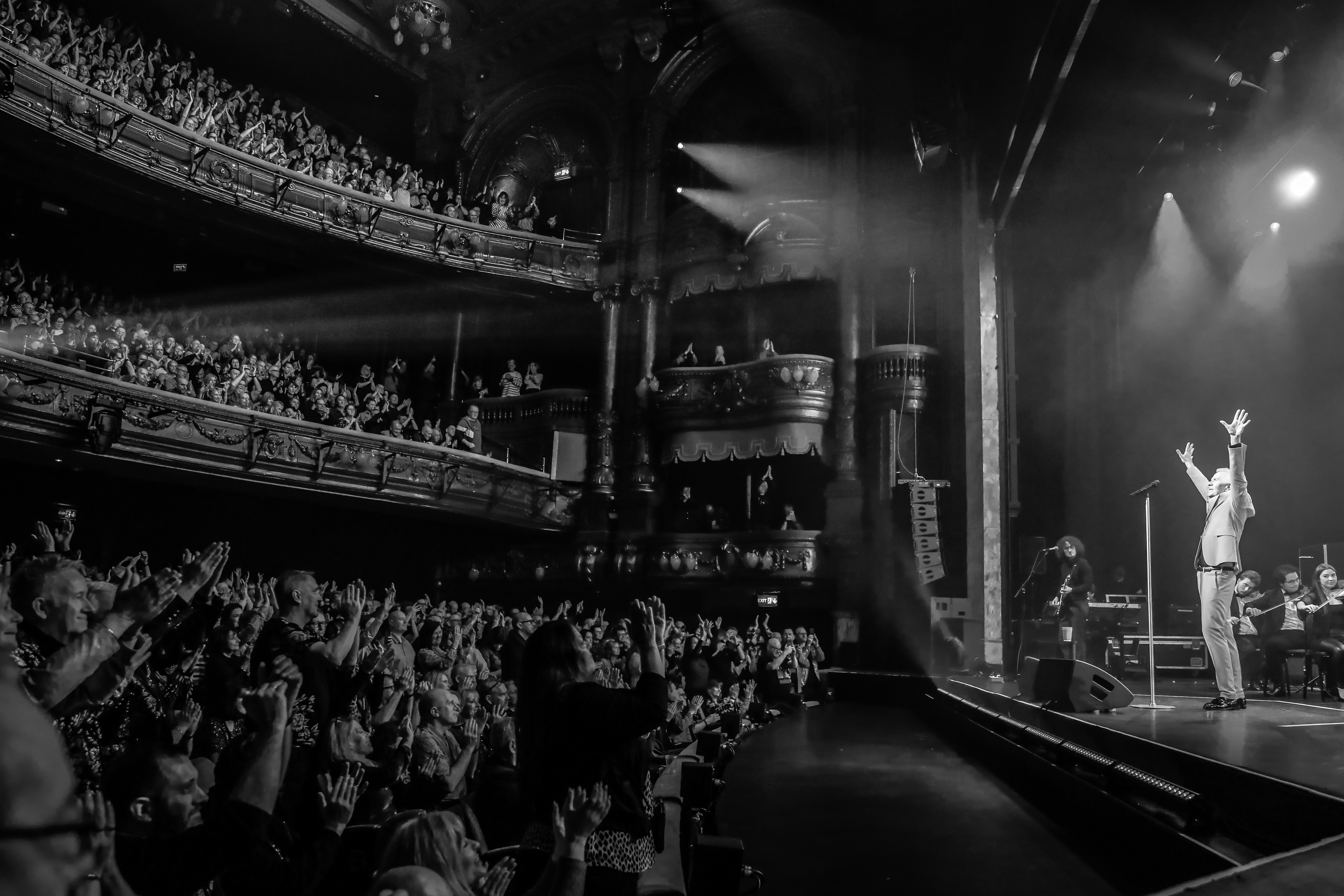
ABC performing live in 2024

In October 2015, Fry announced that he was working on a new ABC studio album. "It's going to be a take on The Lexicon of Love, but all these years on. I'm a man in my fifties now with a wealth of experience. It's about how you grow older but you make the same mistakes over and over and over again."

In November 2015, a compilation album entitled 80s Recovered was released, featuring many artists from the 1980s. ABC contributed a cover version of Radiohead's "High and Dry", with a regular version and a remix.

In January 2016, Fry said the new ABC studio album would be entitled The Lexicon of a Lost Ideal and released in the UK in May 2016. Featuring tracks penned by Fry, with contributions by Rob Fusari, Marcus Vere of Living in a Box, Matt Rowe and Anne Dudley, the album features orchestration arranged by Anne Dudley, who worked in a similar capacity on The Lexicon of Love. In April 2016, the release of the new album, now entitled The Lexicon of Love II, was announced with lead single "Viva Love" made available via digital platforms. It was A playlisted by BBC Radio 2. The release of "Viva Love" was accompanied by a video directed by Julien Temple, who had also worked with the band on the Mantrap and "Poison Arrow" videos, which the new video references. The album was released in the UK and the US on 27 May 2016 and entered the UK Albums Chart at No. 5, the first time ABC had reached the Top 5 since the original Lexicon of Love album in 1982. "The Flames Of Desire" and "Ten Below Zero" were released as follow-up singles. Both were added to the BBC Radio 2 playlist.

ABC also contributed a new song called "Living Inside My Heart" to Fly: Songs Inspired by the Film Eddie the Eagle, the soundtrack of which was released on 18 March 2016 on CD and digitally.

ABC released their first Christmas song, entitled "A Christmas We Deserve", on 2 December 2016 as part of a four-track EP. The other three songs are acoustic versions of "The Love Inside the Love, "Viva Love" and "The Look of Love".

In March 2017, just before the band's Royal Albert Hall orchestra show on April 6 (featuring songs from The Lexicon of Love II, greatest hits and the complete Lexicon of Love album) the band announced the November 2017 XYZ tour. During the tour two new songs were performed: "Look Good Tonite" and "The Life and Times of a Troubadour".

On 22 October 2020, the compilation album The Essential ABC – featuring songs and remixes from the first five albums – entered the UK Albums Chart at No. 62.

=== The Lexicon of Love 40th Anniversary: 2022–present ===
On 9 June 2022, ABC released the vinyl-only single "Look Good Tonite"/"Sixty Seconds Later" in the UK.

To celebrate the 40th anniversary of the release of The Lexicon of Love, the band performed at Sheffield City Hall on 21 June 2022. The show was recorded for future release on CD and DVD.

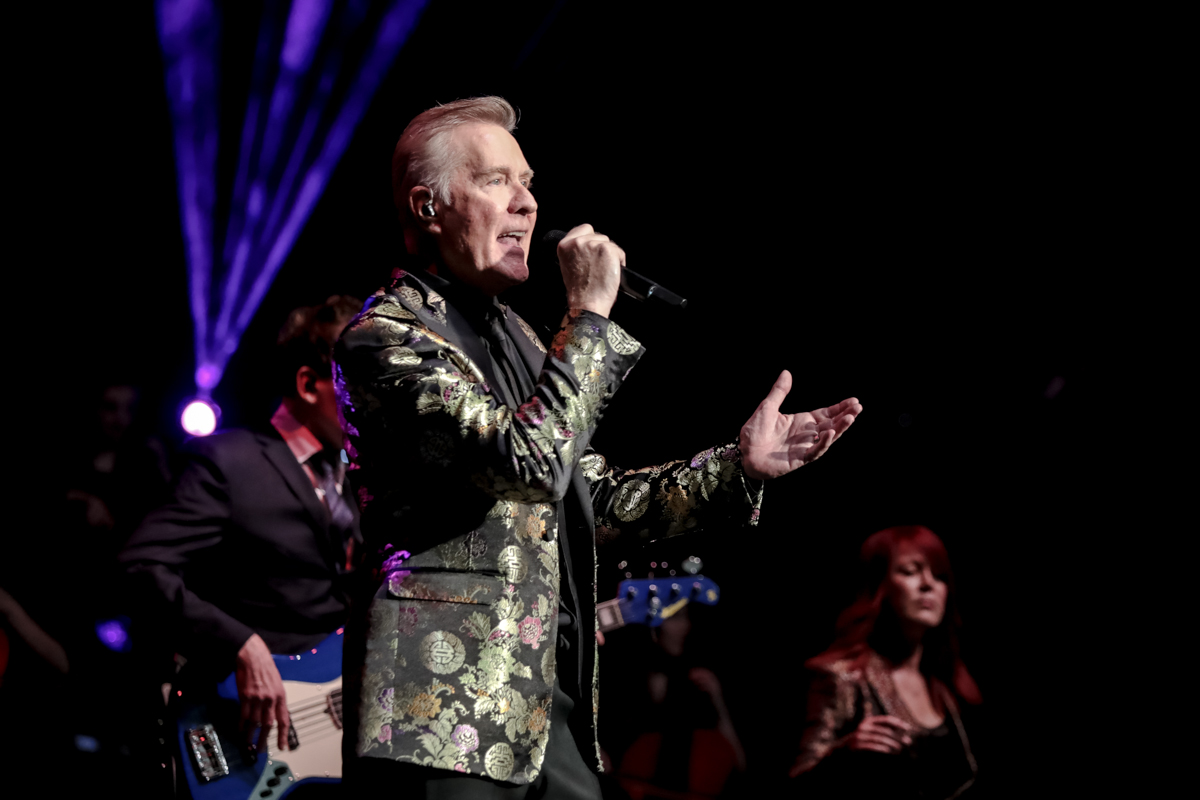
Martin Fry performing in 2023

In January 2023, a US show was announced: the band played at the Cruel World Festival in Pasadena, California on 20 May 2023.

In March 2023, ABC announced the 19 May release of the live double CD The Lexicon of Love 40th Anniversary Live at Sheffield City Hall. It was released digitally and as a limited edition live album on 19 May 2023. The album was recorded in 2022 at a show in ABC's hometown of Sheffield, to mark the 40th anniversary of the seminal studio album, The Lexicon Of Love. ABC were joined by the original orchestral team of Southbank Sinfonia and longtime collaborator and arranger Anne Dudley, who conducted on the evening of the recording. The album features the whole of the original Lexicon of Love album, plus hits including "When Smokey Sings", "Be Near Me", "Viva Love", "(How To Be A) Millionaire" and "The Flames Of Desire".

On 4 August 2023, The Lexicon of Love was reissued (belatedly) for its 40th anniversary with special vinyl editions and an SDE-exclusive Blu-ray audio, No. 12 in the ongoing SDE Surround Series. Renowned musician Steven Wilson of Porcupine Tree remixed the classic album in Dolby Atmos, 5.1 and stereo for this special reissue, which was also made available on streaming platforms. The album (re)entered the UK Albums Chart at No. 48.

In 2024 and 2025, ABC went on tour in North America alongside fellow new wave musician Howard Jones. In the ABC half of each show, Fry performed many of the band's hit songs, mostly from The Lexicon of Love, as well as other hits such as "That Was Then but This Is Now", "Viva Love", and "King Without a Crown".

== Musical style and influences ==
ABC were associated with the British new pop musical movement of the early 1980s. Jess Harvell of Pitchfork wrote that they became "the embodiment" of this scene, adding that "in many ways, no one did it better". The band's music has been categorised as pop, new wave, and synth-pop. ABC's influences included the punk rock group the Sex Pistols; the post-punk bands Joy Division and the Cure; the disco acts Chic and Earth, Wind & Fire; and the glam rock artists Marc Bolan, David Bowie and Roxy Music (described by White as "the holy trinity").

During their early years ABC also sought to blend the sentimentality of mid-20th century show tunes with a modern songwriting aesthetic. Fry was enamoured by contemporary synth-pop acts such as Gary Numan and OMD, but elected to pursue an alternate lyrical approach to those artists' often technology-based themes: "I wanted to take my songs to a more emotional level, along the lines of Rodgers and Hammerstein or Cole Porter. At that time, there were few songs about really loving or hating someone." Fry's gold lamé suit, which became his visual trademark, was inspired by the wardrobe of rock musician Billy Fury.

== Band members ==
Current member

- Martin Fry – lead vocals (1980–present)

Former members

- Stephen Singleton – alto and tenor saxophones (1980–1984)
- Mark White – keyboards, guitars (1980–1991)
- Mark Lickley – bass guitar (1981–1982)
- David Robinson – drums, percussion (1981)
- David Palmer – drums, percussion (1981–1983, 2004–2009)
- Fiona Russell Powell – vocals (1984–1985)
- David Yarritu – vocals (1984–1985)

=== Line-ups ===
1980–1981	1981	1981–1982	1982–1983 (Classic Lineup)
Martin Fry – vocals; Stephen Singleton – alto and tenor saxophones; Mark White – guitars, keyboards, programming	Martin Fry – vocals; Stephen Singleton – alto and tenor saxophones; Mark White – guitars, keyboards, programming; Mark Lickley – bass guitar; David Robinson – drums, percussion	Martin Fry – vocals; Stephen Singleton – alto and tenor saxophones; Mark White – guitars, keyboards, programming; Mark Lickley – bass guitar; David Palmer – drums, percussion	Martin Fry – vocals; Stephen Singleton – alto and tenor saxophones; Mark White – guitars, keyboards, programming; David Palmer – drums, percussion
1983–1984	1984–1985	1985–1991	1991–2004
Martin Fry – vocals; Stephen Singleton – alto and tenor saxophones; Mark White – guitars, keyboards, programming	Martin Fry – vocals; Mark White – guitars, keyboards, programming; Fiona Russell Powell – vocals; David Yarritu – vocals	Martin Fry – vocals; Mark White – guitars, keyboards, programming	Martin Fry – vocals
2004–2009	2009–present
Martin Fry – vocals; David Palmer – drums, percussion	Martin Fry – vocals

== Discography ==
Studio albums

- The Lexicon of Love (1982)
- Beauty Stab (1983)
- How to Be a ... Zillionaire! (1985)
- Alphabet City (1987)
- Up (1989)
- Abracadabra (1991)
- Skyscraping (1997)
- Traffic (2008)
- The Lexicon of Love II (2016)

== Dance chart success ==
ABC had three number-one hits on the US Dance Club Songs:

- "The Look of Love" (18 December 1982),
- "Be Near Me" (28 September – 5 October 1984)
- "When Smokey Sings" / "Chicago" (29 August – 5 September 1987).

== See also ==
- Honeyroot
- Timeline of Billboard number-one dance songs
- List of artists who reached number one on the US Dance Club Songs chart
- List of synth-pop artists
