= Keith Breeden =

British artist

Keith Breeden RP (born 25 March 1956) is a graphic designer and portraitist. He is a member of the Royal Society of Portrait Painters.

== Early life ==
Keith attended St. Wilfred's Primary in Northwich from 1962 to 1967 before attending St Ambrose College from 1967 to 1973, where he was in the same A-level art class as Peter Saville and Malcolm Garrett of a class of just six pupils. Around this time he lived in Wimpey housing estate. At times he played truant to go to the Manchester Free Trade Hall and help carry in equipment for concerts by Free, Pink Floyd, Hawkwind, among other bands. This rebellious attitude extended to breaking school uniform rules through wearing shoulder length hair and flares. Ultimately he left St Ambrose prematurely without taking any public examinations. After a challenging foundation year at technical college in Northwich, in 1974 he applied to study fine art at Bath Academy of Art, Corsham, but found the course to be 'dull and pointless' and left during the first year.

== Early career ==
By 1974 Keith was working as a cellarman in a casino in Berkeley Square. Malcolm Garrett learnt of this from Keith's sister and so got in touch with Keith, offering him to design the sleeve for a reissue of 'I Had Too Much to Dream (Last Night)' by the Electric Prunes. During this time, Breeden designed covers for bands like Gang of Four, ABC, Angelic Upstarts, and The Photos. In 1979, Garrett and Breeden moved into a studio in Tottenham Court Road. In 1984, Garrett and his partner, Kasper de Graaf, suggested that Breeden become a formal partner in Assorted Images, their company. This disturbed Breeden, who had always been wary of anything to do with business, so he moved out.

He continued designing sleeves and set up DKB (Design KB) in 1984, where he was joined by Peter Curzon and Martin Jenkins. Continuing as a graphic designer for sleeves, he worked with ABC, Scritti Politti, Pink Floyd, Roxy Music, and Fine Young Cannibals. Breeden's logo work with ABC would display nuances of usage as the group reinvented itself from album to album. His various concepts for Scritti Politti would range from disarrayed wildflowers to chocolate bars and boxes to the many visual ways to reference Aretha Franklin, all suggesting elements of modern love at a period when Scritti was strongly establishing a transition to urban romance from a more DIY aesthetic that had previously distinguished their sound. The band was all Caucasian and on one cover of an early soul-inspired single a white chocolate bar is featured. Other noteworthy pieces include his work on the covers of Duran Duran's Seven and the Ragged Tiger album (along with Malcolm Garrett), The Mission's Carved in Sand album and related singles, and The Cult's 1987 Electric album (along with Storm Thorgerson) and its first two singles ("Love Removal Machine" and "Lil' Devil").

In 1996 he gave up sleeve design when he decided to concentrate on painting.

=== Graphic design awards ===
- 1985 First Prize, Single Sleeve (Music Week Awards).
- 1986 First Prize, Single Sleeve (Music Week Awards).
- 1986 First Prize, Album Sleeve (Music Week Awards).
- 1986 Third Prize, Album Sleeve (Music Week Awards).

== Portraiture ==
Breeden took a new direction in 1995 and is now professional portraitist. Commissions have included Sir Brian Smith, Vice Chancellor of Cardiff University, Sir Dominic Cadbury Chairman of Cadbury Schweppes, Professor John Temple, President of the Royal College of Physicians of Edinburgh and Professor Roger Williams, Vice Chancellor of the University of Reading.

=== Portraiture awards ===
- 1996 Visitors Choice (BP Awards, National Portrait Gallery, London).
- 1998 Elected to the Royal Society of Portrait Painters.
- 2000 First Prize (Kodak FotoKalender awards, Kalenderschau, Stuttgart)

== Personal life ==
Breeden is married with three children. He lives in Wales.
