= Be Near Me =

Single by ABC

from the album How to Be a ... Zillionaire!
- B-side: "A to Z", "What's Your Destination?"
- Released: 29 March 1985
- Recorded: December 1984
- Genre: Synth-pop; dance-pop; blue-eyed soul
- Length: 3:38
- Label: Neutron; Mercury; Vertigo
- Songwriters: Martin Fry; Mark White
- Producers: Martin Fry; Mark White

ABC singles chronology
"(How to Be A) Millionaire" (1984)	"Be Near Me" (1985)	"Vanity Kills" (1985)

Music video
- "Be Near Me" on YouTube

"Be Near Me" is a song by English pop band ABC. It was released in April 1985 as the second single from their third studio album, How to Be a ... Zillionaire!. It peaked at No. 26 on the UK Singles Chart in 1985, and was the only single from the album to reach the UK top 40. It was more successful in the United States where it reached No. 9 on the Billboard Hot 100. The song also went to number-one on the U.S. Hot Dance Club Play chart in September of that year, remaining on top for two weeks.

== Composition ==
The song is written in F major (C mixolydian mode) with a BPM of 125.

== Music video ==
The song's music video was directed by Peter Care and shows the four band members in colourful attire playing oversized, cartoonish, instruments, against a white background and floor while the camera makes a series of rolling, panning and swooping shots.

== Track listing ==
=== 7" version ===
US release

1. "Be Near Me" – 3:38
2. "A to Z" – 2:50

UK release

1. "Be Near Me" – 3:38
2. "A to Z" – 2:50

=== 12" version ===
US release

1. "Be Near Me" (Munich Disco Mix) – 5:28
2. "Be Near Me" (Ecstasy Mix) – 4:45
3. "What's Your Destination?" (instrumental version of "Be Near Me") – 3:36

UK release

1. "Be Near Me" (Munich Disco Mix) – 5:27
2. "A to Z" – 2:50
3. "What's Your Destination?" (instrumental version of "Be Near Me") – 3:38

== Personnel ==
Credits adapted from the original album liner notes, "One Two Testing" and "International Musician".

ABC

- Martin Fry - lead and backing vocals
- Mark White - E-mu Emulator II, Fairlight CMI programming

Additional Musicians

- Gary Moberley - Fairlight CMI programming
- Don Snow - piano, Oberheim OB-X and Yamaha DX7 synthesizers
- Brad Lang - bass guitar
- Keith LeBlanc - E-mu Drumulator programming
- David Palmer - hi-hat

== Chart performance ==
=== Weekly charts ===
Chart (1985)	Peak position
Canada Top Singles (RPM)	22
UK Singles Chart	26
US Billboard Hot 100	9
US Billboard Adult Contemporary	11
US Billboard Hot Dance Club Play	1
US Cash Box Top 100	10

=== Year-end charts ===
Chart (1985)	Rank
U.S. Billboard Hot 100	71
U.S. Cash Box	90

== See also ==
- List of Billboard number-one Dance Club songs
