= Beauty Stab =

Studio album by ABC
- Released: 14 November 1983
- Recorded: August–September 1983
- Studios: Sarm East (London); Sarm West (London); Townhouse (London); Abbey Road (London)
- Genres: New wave; pop rock; sophisti-pop; hard rock; synth-pop
- Length: 42:58
- Label: Neutron
- Producers: ABC; Gary Langan

ABC chronology
The Lexicon of Love (1982)	Beauty Stab (1983)	How to Be a ... Zillionaire! (1985)

Singles from Beauty Stab
- 1. "That Was Then but This Is Now" Released: October 1983; 2. "S.O.S." Released: January 1984

Professional ratings
Review scores
Source	Rating
AllMusic	3/5 stars
The Encyclopedia of Popular Music	3/5 stars
The Rolling Stone Album Guide	3/5 stars
Smash Hits	6/10
Uncut	3/5 stars
The Village Voice	A−

Beauty Stab is the second studio album by the English pop band ABC, released on 14 November 1983 by Neutron Records, Mercury Records and Vertigo Records. The album was recorded over a period of three months between August and September 1983, in sessions that took place at Sarm Studios East and West, Townhouse Studios and Abbey Road Studios. It was a departure from the stylised production of the band's debut studio album, The Lexicon of Love (1982), and featured a more guitar-oriented sound.

The album was produced by ABC with Gary Langan, who had been the audio engineer on the band's debut studio album. The band employed the rhythm section of Andy Newmark (drums) and Alan Spenner (bass guitar) both of whom had recently recorded and toured with Roxy Music at the time. The inner sleeve photography was by Gered Mankowitz.

On release, the album was received negatively by the majority of music critics. In a 1995 article, music journalist Simon Reynolds listed Beauty Stab among "the great career-sabotage LPs in pop history". In retrospect, the band members themselves have been quite vocal in that they were less satisfied with the album with founding member Stephen Singleton leaving the band soon after promotion for the album was completed. Martin Fry later stated that "we were eager to go in a totally different direction [to The Lexicon of Love]. We didn't want to do a sequel. In retrospect, perhaps that is exactly what we should have done". The album was certified Gold by the BPI for shipments in excess of 100,000 copies, but was not as commercially successful as its predecessor. It peaked at No. 12 on the UK Albums Chart and spawned only two Top 40 singles (neither of which made the Top 10).

In 2005, a digitally remastered CD of the album was released with three bonus tracks.

== Critical reception ==
Upon its release the album received negative reviews. Smash Hits reviewer Dave Rimmer wrote: "Depending on how you look at it, the self-produced "Beauty Stab" is either a radical mixture of styles or a complete and utter mess, but no way is it another classy pop collection like "The Lexicon of Love"" and deemed the album "an awkward-sounding and not enterily enjoyable experience."

According to Bob Stanley of The Guardian, Beauty Stab was a drastic departure from The Lexicon of Love, and was "their attempt to take on the preconceptions of their fanbase": "The strings were gone, replaced by some tough guitars that sounded weirdly dated – sometimes like Low-era Bowie, sometimes closer to Led Zeppelin. Had it been released two years later, when guitars were voguish once more, it would have kept the ABC boat afloat. Instead, it just sounded confusing." The song "That Was Then but This Is Now" has appeared in several worst lyrics polls including one held in 2007 by BBC Radio 6 Music.

In a list of follow-up albums featuring a change in style, Alfred Soto of Stylus Magazine said that "the band abandoned the marimbas and Mantovani" of their previous album "for rawk power chords and declamatory singing." Although noting that "most of its songs are as politically informed as a can of hair spray", he felt that "Beauty Stab is touching, the sound of young men with too much money and too facile a talent for one-liners getting back at the philistines who dismissed them as nancy boys."

== Track listing ==
All tracks are written by Martin Fry, Mark White and Stephen Singleton.

Side one
No.	Title	Length
1.	"That Was Then but This Is Now"	3:34
2.	"Love's a Dangerous Language"	3:40
3.	"If I Ever Thought You'd Be Lonely"	3:55
4.	"The Power of Persuasion"	3:32
5.	"Beauty Stab"	2:06
6.	"By Default by Design"	4:07

Side two
No.	Title	Length
7.	"Hey Citizen!"	3:55
8.	"King Money"	4:02
9.	"Bite the Hand"	3:06
10.	"Unzip"	2:49
11.	"S.O.S."	4:49
12.	"United Kingdom"	3:23
Total length:		42:58

2005 re-release bonus tracks
No.	Title	Length
13.	"Vertigo"	1:58
14.	"Selections from the Magnificent New ABC Long-Player 'Beauty Stab'"	5:48
15.	"That Was Then but This Is Now" (Unedited)	5:58

== Personnel ==
ABC

- Martin Fry – lead and backing vocals
- Mark White – pianos; Roland Juno-6; E-mu Emulator; synthesizers; guitars
- Stephen Singleton – alto saxophone

Additional personnel

- Alan Spenner – bass guitar
- Andy Newmark – drums
- Luís Jardim (misspelled as "Louis Jardin" on album notes) – percussion
- Howie Casey – baritone saxophone; tenor saxophone
- David Theodore – oboe
- ABC and David Bedford – string arrangements

== Production ==
- ABC – producers; arrangements; album sleeve design
- Gary Langan – producer; engineer
- John Kurlander – assistant engineer at Abbey Road Studios
- Bob Kraushaar – assistant engineer at Sarm Studios East and West
- Keith Nixon – assistant engineer at Townhouse Studios
- Gered Mankowitz – photography
- Keith Breeden – album sleeve design assistant
- Bill Gerber and Lookout Management – management

== Charts ==
Chart performance for Beauty Stab
Chart (1983–1984)	Peak position
Australian Albums (Kent Music Report)	58
Canada Top Albums/CDs (RPM)	36
Dutch Albums (Album Top 100)	29
Finnish Albums (Suomen virallinen lista)	22
German Albums (Offizielle Top 100)	50
Japanese Albums (Oricon)	34
New Zealand Albums (RMNZ)	42
Swedish Albums (Sverigetopplistan)	32
UK Albums (Official Charts)	12
US Billboard 200	69
