= Stephen Singleton =

English saxophonist (born 1959)

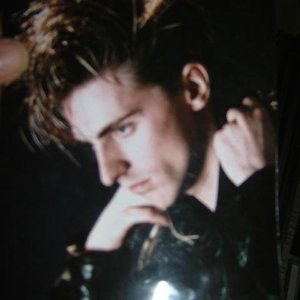
- Singleton in 1983

Background information
- Born: Stephen Barry Singleton; 17 April 1959 (age 67); Sheffield, England
- Genres: Pop; new wave; synth-pop; new pop
- Occupations: Musician; composer
- Instruments: Saxophone; guitar; keyboards; synthesizers
- Years active: 1977–present
- Member of: Vice Versa
- Formerly of: ABC; Bleep & Booster

Stephen Barry Singleton (born 17 April 1959) is an English musician and composer. He was the alto and tenor saxophonist in the pop band ABC, and was credited as a co-writer on all of their tracks until his departure in 1984. He also starred in their short film Mantrap (1983).

According to an interview Singleton did for the documentary Made in Sheffield (2001), he was friends with Def Leppard's lead vocalist Joe Elliott when the two were young children. Along with Mark White and David Sydenham, he founded the electronic band Vice Versa in 1977. He also produced several issues of Steve's Papers, a Sheffield punk rock fanzine.

In the early 1990s, Singleton was a member of the band Bleep & Booster, who released an album on London Records and produced some remixes for East 17. Singleton also produced records by Treebound Story (featuring a young Richard Hawley), The Screaming Trees album A Fracture in Time and Libitina.

Singleton declined to participate in VH1's Bands Reunited in 2004, when attempts were made to reform ABC for a one-off performance. Only two members, Martin Fry and David Palmer, reunited and performed.

In 2015, Stephen Singleton and Mark White reformed Vice Versa.

== Discography ==
Year	Artist	Album title	Label
1980	Vice Versa	8 Aspects Of	Neutron
1982	ABC	The Lexicon of Love	Neutron
1983	ABC	Beauty Stab	Neutron
1994	Bleep & Booster	The World Of	London
2005	Stephen Singleton	Stephen Singleton	White label
2014	Vice Versa	Electrogenesis 1978–1980	VOD
