= Martin Fry =

English singer (born 1958)

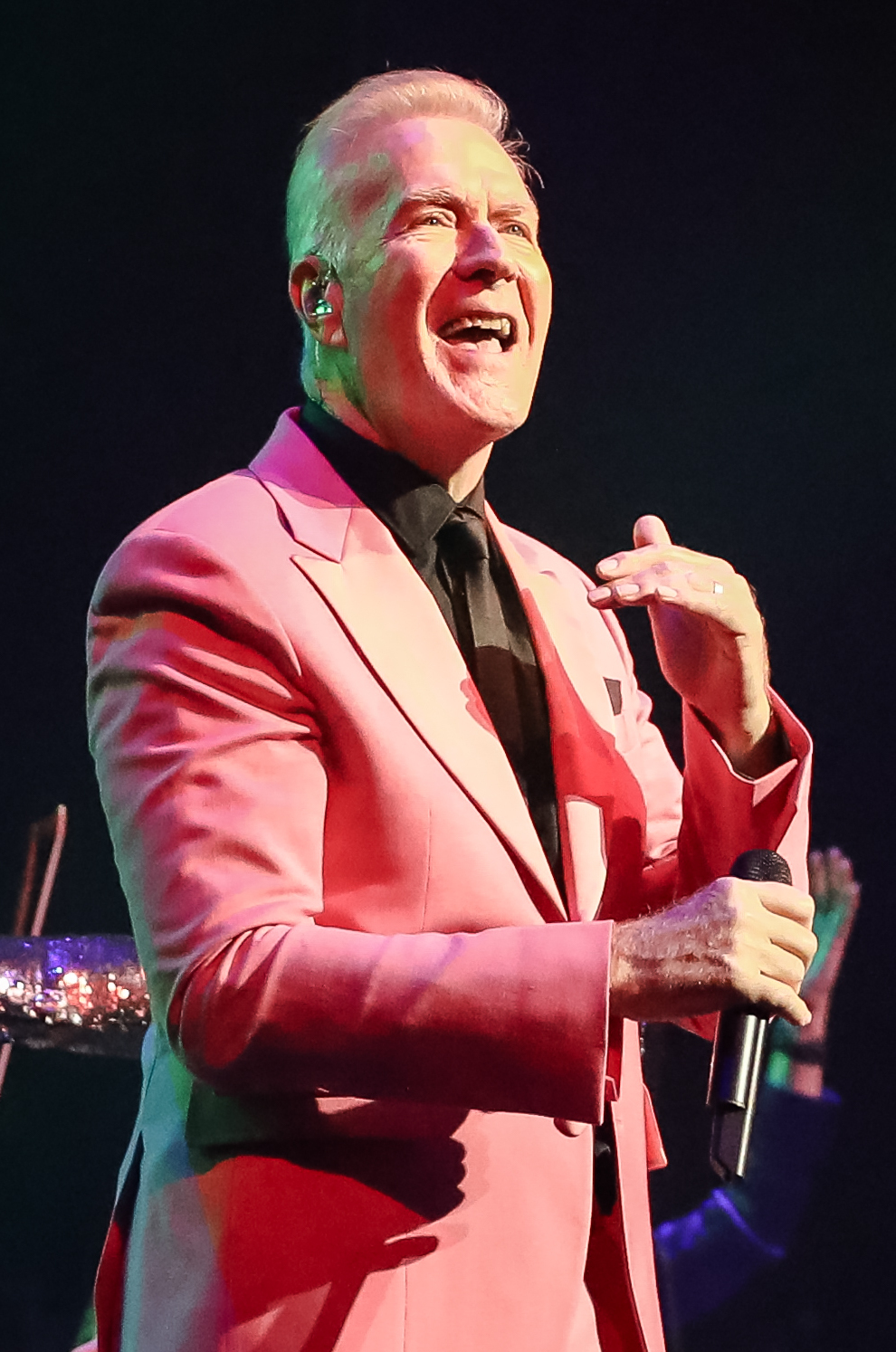
- Fry performing in 2023

Background information
- Born: Martin David Fry; 9 March 1958 (age 68); Stretford, Lancashire, England
- Origin: Bramhall, Stockport, England
- Genres: Synth-pop; new wave; pop rock; sophisti-pop; blue-eyed soul; house
- Occupations: Singer; songwriter
- Instrument: Vocals
- Years active: 1980–present
- Member of: ABC
- Formerly of: Vice Versa
- Website: abcmartinfry.com

Martin David Fry (born 9 March 1958) is an English singer and songwriter. He came to prominence in the early 1980s as co-founder and lead vocalist of the pop band ABC, which released six singles that entered the top 20 charts in the United Kingdom during the 1980s, including "Tears Are Not Enough", "Poison Arrow", "The Look of Love", "All of My Heart", "That Was Then but This Is Now" and "When Smokey Sings". He is the only member who has been with ABC throughout its entire history and is currently its only official member.

== Early years ==
Martin David Fry was born on 9 March 1958 in Stretford, Lancashire (now part of the Metropolitan Borough of Trafford in Greater Manchester), and grew up in nearby Bramhall (now part of Stockport), with his younger brother Jamie, who later joined the indie rock band Earl Brutus. Fry was editing a fanzine titled Modern Drugs in 1978, and first met future ABC band members Mark White and Stephen Singleton while interviewing them for an article in the fanzine. White and Singleton, then fronting electronic band Vice Versa, invited Fry to play additional keyboards.

== ABC ==
With Fry in place as lead vocalist and lyricist, Vice Versa changed their name to ABC and changed their sound to a contemporary pop style that at that time led them to be categorised with bands like Duran Duran, Spandau Ballet and the Human League. Between 1982 and 1991, ABC recorded six studio albums (The Lexicon of Love, Beauty Stab, How to Be a ... Zillionaire!, Alphabet City, Up and Abracadabra) and released a greatest hits compilation album, Absolutely. During this time, the band went through numerous personnel changes, with Fry and Mark White being its only permanent members.

Following the Zillionaire album, ABC temporarily fell from prominence while Fry was being treated for Hodgkin lymphoma, an uncommon cancer.

In 1991, Mark White decided to retire from ABC. His departure was facilitated by a financial agreement, allowing him to leave the music industry and pursue personal interests, notably in Reiki therapy. This arrangement enabled ABC to continue its musical journey under the leadership of Martin Fry. ABC released their seventh studio album Skyscraping, a homage to several of his musical heroes, including David Bowie, Roxy Music and the Sex Pistols. The album was a collaboration with Glenn Gregory of Heaven 17 and Honeyroot's Keith Lowndes.

The band has toured extensively and performed live at events such as the 2001 Night of the Proms, where Fry was supported by a 72-piece orchestra and 50-piece choir. In 2008, Fry released a new ABC studio album titled Traffic.

In April 2009, Fry and original drummer David Palmer performed The Lexicon of Love album live at the Royal Albert Hall in London. The band was accompanied by the BBC Concert Orchestra. Anne Dudley of Art of Noise fame, who arranged and played keyboards on the original record, conducted the Royal Albert Hall performance.

Fry and Palmer (as ABC) toured the U.S. as part of the 2009 'Regeneration Tour', which also featured Terri Nunn of Berlin, Wang Chung and the Cutting Crew.

In April 2016, a single with a music video, "Viva Love" was released as a teaser for The Lexicon of Love II studio album. The album entered the UK Albums Chart at No. 5, the band's highest chart position since 1982 and first top 10 entry since 1990.

== Other work ==
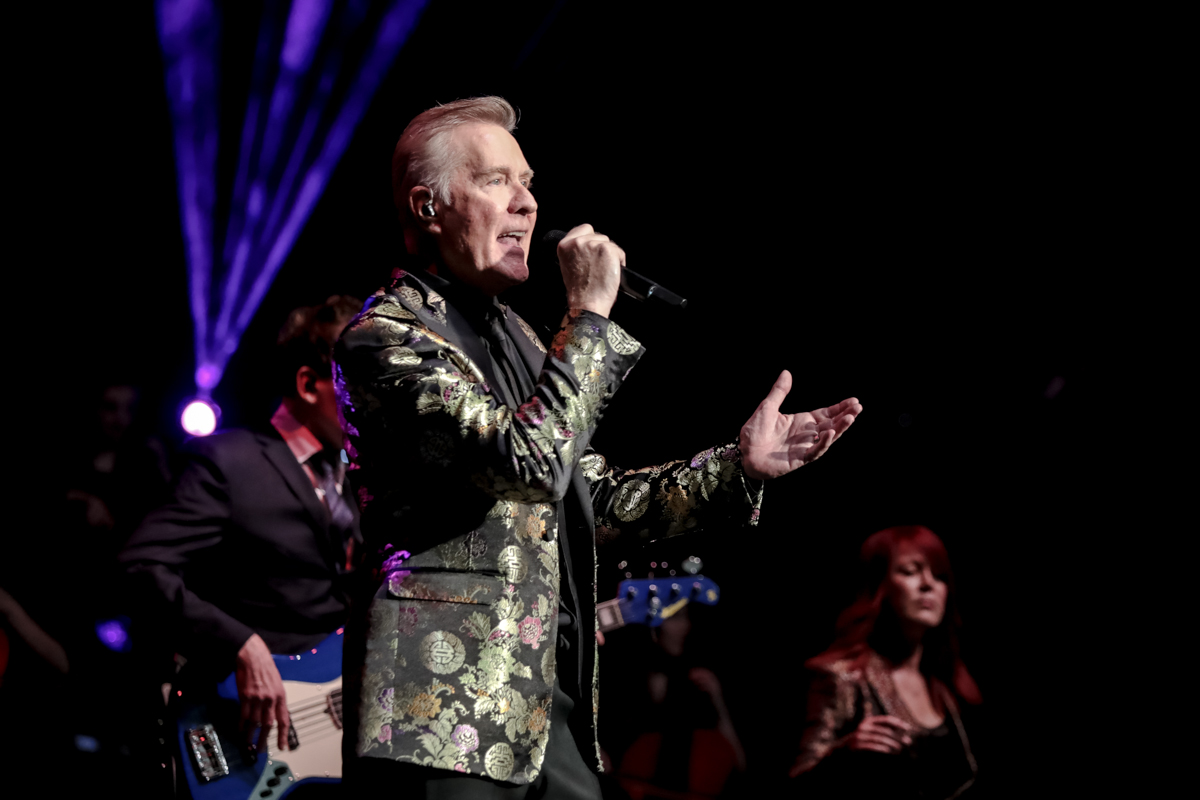
Martin Fry – The Lexicon Of Love Orchestral Tour 2024

Besides working with ABC, Fry has also recorded and toured with other artists.

- In 1989, Fry recorded a song called "Mythical Girl" with Arthur Baker for Baker's album Merge, a project that included songs with various artists, including Love Is the Message featuring Al Green.
- Together with Mark White, Fry co-wrote and produced a couple of songs on Paul Rutherford's 1989 solo studio album Oh World, including the single "Get Real".
- In 1997, Fry contributed to David Arnold's Shaken and Stirred: The David Arnold James Bond Project, an album made up of re-recordings of James Bond movie themes featuring vocals by contemporary artists. The song Fry performed was the theme of Thunderball.
- In 2005, Fry embarked on an extensive UK tour with Tony Hadley, former lead vocalist of the 1980s new wave band Spandau Ballet. Highlights of the tour were released on CD and DVD compilations, both titled Tony Hadley vs. Martin Fry.
- Fry appeared in the BBC Television program Just the Two of Us in 2006. This was a reality television competition in the style of Strictly Come Dancing, but this time with contestants (one celebrity being a famous singer, the other celeb being a novice) judged upon their singing skills as part of a duet. He was teamed with TV presenter Gaby Roslin and they were eliminated in the first show after battling the team of Nicky Campbell and Beverley Knight.
- Fry was featured extensively in the 2006 VH1 mini-series 100 Greatest Songs of the 80's, which featured ABC's 1982 single "The Look of Love" ranked No. 43.
- Fry worked on several songs for the 2007 film Music and Lyrics starring Hugh Grant and Drew Barrymore. Fry also served as Grant's vocal coach for the film.
- Fry toured the US in the summer of 2008 with the Regeneration Tour 2008, a show that also featured the Human League as the headliners, Belinda Carlisle, A Flock of Seagulls, and Naked Eyes.

== Personal life ==
Fry and his wife, Julie, have twin children, Nancy and Louis.

On 19 July 2012, Fry received an honorary Doctor of Music degree from the University of Sheffield for his contribution of more than 30 years to music. The following day, his daughter, Nancy received her degree from the Department of Sociological Studies from the same university.

As of 2026, he has been married to his wife Julie for more than 40 years.

== Discography ==
ABC

Year	Album
1982	The Lexicon of Love
1983	Beauty Stab
1985	How to Be a ... Zillionaire!
1987	Alphabet City
1989	Up
1991	Abracadabra
1997	Skyscraping
2008	Traffic
2016	The Lexicon of Love II
