= Mark White (British musician) =

English singer-songwriter (born 1961)

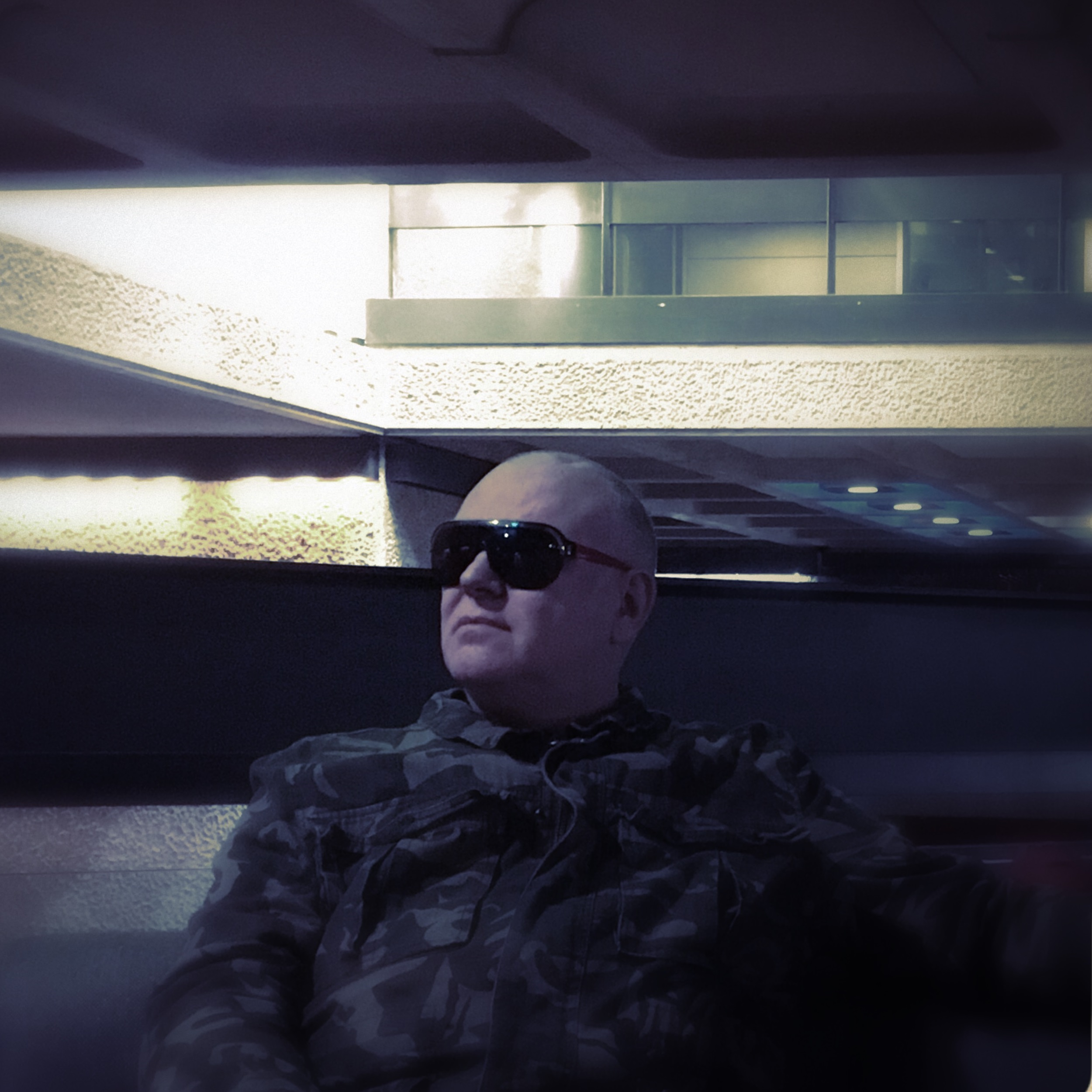
- White in 2016

Background information
- Born: Mark Andrew White; 1 April 1961 (age 65); Sheffield, England
- Genres: Pop; new wave; synth-pop; new pop
- Occupations: Singer; songwriter; composer; musician; music programmer; record producer
- Instruments: Keyboards; synthesizer; guitar; vocals
- Years active: 1977–1992; 2014–present
- Labels: Neutron; Mercury; Vertigo; Phonogram; VOD
- Member of: Vice Versa
- Formerly of: ABC

Mark Andrew White (born 1 April 1961) is an English singer, songwriter, composer, musician and record producer.

Born in Sheffield, England, White first entered the music industry in the late 1970s as the lead vocalist and keyboardist of the electronic band Vice Versa. After releasing one studio album with the band in 1980, Vice Versa member Martin Fry emerged as lead vocalist and the band opted to transform into a new band called ABC. White resigned himself to composing ABC's music while also playing guitar and keyboards before retiring from the music industry a year after the release of their sixth studio album, Abracadabra (1991). As ABC's keyboardist he used a variety of instruments, including the E-mu Emulator, the Yamaha DX7 and the Fairlight CMI.

In 2014, White came out of retirement to reform Vice Versa with Stephen Singleton.

== Music career ==
In the late 1970s, White was a member of ABC's predecessor band, the three-piece electronic band Vice Versa. Other members of the trio were David Sydenham and future ABC saxophonist Stephen Singleton. After being interviewed by future ABC lead vocalist Martin Fry for his fanzine, Modern Drugs, the band members invited Fry to join the band as a keyboardist, and Vice Versa later evolved into ABC.

With Fry in place as lead vocalist and songwriter, Vice Versa changed its name to ABC and changed its sound to a contemporary pop style that at that time led them to be categorised with bands like Duran Duran, Spandau Ballet and the Human League. Between 1982 and 1991, ABC recorded six studio albums, The Lexicon of Love (1982), Beauty Stab (1983), How to Be a ... Zillionaire! (1985), Alphabet City (1987), Up (1989) and Abracadabra (1991), and released a greatest hits compilation album, Absolutely (1990). During this time, the band went through numerous personnel changes, with White and Fry being its only permanent members.

Together with Fry, White co-wrote and produced a couple of songs on Paul Rutherford's sole solo studio album Oh World (1989), including the single "Get Real".

== Later years ==
In 1991, Mark White decided to retire from ABC. His departure was facilitated by a financial agreement, allowing him to leave the music industry and pursue personal interests, notably in reiki therapy. This arrangement enabled ABC to continue its musical journey under the leadership of Martin Fry. White declined to participate in VH1's Bands Reunited in 2004, when attempts were made to reform ABC for a one-off performance.

In 2014, White, together with Singleton, compiled the Vice Versa box set, Electrogenesis 1978–1980 which was released on VOD Records. This led to White coming out of retirement to reform the band. In December 2015, the duo released a Christmas single called "Little Drum Machine Boy", which was available to download for free on SoundCloud. They have yet to release anything since.

== Discography ==
With Vice Versa

Year	Album
1980	8 Aspects Of
2014	Electrogenesis 1978–1980

With ABC

Year	Album
1982	The Lexicon of Love
1983	Beauty Stab
1985	How to Be a ... Zillionaire!
1987	Alphabet City
1989	Up
1991	Abracadabra
