= Say Hello =

2005 single by Deep Dish

Single by Deep Dish

from the album George Is On
- Released: July 2, 2005
- Length: 3:06 (radio edit)
- Label: Deep Dish; Thrive
- Songwriters: Ali Shirazinia; Sharam Tayebi; Louise Anousheh Khalifi
- Producers: Ali Shirazinia; Sharam Tayebi

Deep Dish singles chronology
"Flashdance" (2004)	"Say Hello" (2005)	"Sacramento" (2005)

"Say Hello" is a song by American electronic music duo Deep Dish. It was originally included on the group's 2005 album, George Is On, and was released as a single on July 2, 2005. The song's vocals were provided by Anousheh Khalili.

"Say Hello" became another popular hit for the group, topping the US Billboard Dance Club Play chart and peaking at number 14 on the UK Singles Chart. In Finland, it reached number four to become the band's first of three top-10 singles. It was nominated for a Grammy Award in the category Best Dance Recording at the 2006 ceremony, losing out to "Galvanize" by the Chemical Brothers.

== Charts ==
=== Weekly charts ===
Chart (2005)	Peak position
Australia (ARIA)	40
Australian Club Chart (ARIA)	1
Australian Dance (ARIA)	5
Belgium (Ultratip Bubbling Under Flanders)	6
Belgium (Ultratip Bubbling Under Wallonia)	18
Belgium Dance (Ultratop Flanders)	4
Finland (Suomen virallinen lista)	4
Germany (GfK)	72
Greece (IFPI)	11
Hungary (Rádiós Top 40)	31
Hungary (Dance Top 40)	1
Ireland (IRMA)	18
Ireland Dance (IRMA)	1
Netherlands (Single Top 100)	44
Scotland Singles (OCC)	7
Switzerland (Schweizer Hitparade)	90
UK Singles (OCC)	14
UK Dance (OCC)	1
US Dance Club Songs (Billboard)	1
US Dance/Mix Show Airplay (Billboard)	12

=== Year-end charts ===
Chart (2005)	Position
Australian Club Chart (ARIA)	14
Romania (Romanian Top 100)	72
US Dance Club Play (Billboard)	2

== Release history ==
Region	Date	Format(s)	Label(s)	Ref.
Japan	July 2, 2005	CD	KSR	
Australia	July 4, 2005	CD	Sony Music Australia	
United Kingdom	July 11, 2005	12-inch vinyl; CD	Positiva	

== See also ==
- List of UK Dance Chart number-one singles of 2005
- Number-one dance hits of 2005 (USA)
