= Shandi Sinnamon =

American singer and songwriter (born 1952)

- Born: Shandi Sinnamon; 1952; Miami, Florida, United States
- Died: July 4, 2024 (aged 71–72)
- Instruments: Vocals

Shandi Sinnamon (1952 – July 4, 2024) was an American singer and songwriter.

== Career ==
Shandi was born to a Huguenot family as Shandra Sinnamon in Miami, Florida. After dropping out of high school, she left home for Big Sur, California. Her ambition was to become a singer and songwriter.

After a bicycle accident in L.A., she went back to Florida for recuperation. While recovering, she studied music and drama at a community college. While she was singing in a local restaurant, a disc jockey noticed her talent and introduced her to Elektra/Asylum Records.

In 1976, she released her first album, Shandi Sinnamon, on Asylum Records.

Around the same time in Los Angeles, California, Mike Chapman discovered her. In 1980, they released her second album Shandi from his Dreamland Records, with Chapman producing.

Shandi and Ronald Magness wrote and performed the song "He's a Dream" that was used in the 1983 film Flashdance, the soundtrack of which won the Grammy Award for Best Album of Original Score in 1984. The song was covered by Deep Dish in 2004 as "Flashdance".

She has since written and performed songs for films and TV dramas, including "Tough Love" for the film The Karate Kid, "Living on the Edge" & "Double Trouble" for the film Making the Grade, "Fight to Survive" for the film Bloodsport, "Gotcha", title song for the film Gotcha!, "Seven Day Heaven" for Where the Boys Are '84, "Eyes of Fire" for The Little Drummer Girl, "Wild Roses" for Echo Park, and "Boy of My Dreams" for Tower of Terror, among many others.

TV compositions include: "Leave Yesterday Behind" for the TV drama Leave Yesterday Behind, "Slow Dance" for the movie Can You Feel Me Dancing, and sang the theme song Charles in Charge for the 1984-1990 TV series.

In 1985, her song "Making It" (composed by Richie Zito) became a local hit in Japan. She also sang the song "Only a Memory Away" as Sailor Mercury in the English adaptation of the Japanese series Sailor Moon (1995). (See also Sailor Moon soundtracks (USA))

She has worked as a backing vocalist for Todd Rundgren, Bernadette Peters, Hoyt Axton, and Johnny Hallyday.

She lived in Eugene, Oregon. In 2005, she was named Eugene's S.L.U.G. Queen as "Frank SlugSnotra".

Shandi Sinnamon died on July 4, 2024.

== Discography ==
=== Albums ===
- 1976: Shandi Sinnamon
- 1980: Shandi
- 1980: Leather and Pearls
- 1982: Love Ordeal
- 1985: Back on the Streets
- 1986: Slow Dance
- 1986: Damsel in Distress
- 1987: Americana
- 1987: Little Bird
- 1990: Urban Berlin
- 1992: Straight One Take
- 2004: I'm Packin

=== Singles ===
- "Rainbow In My Heart" 1976
- "Making It" 1985

== Award ==
- 1984: He's A Dream - Grammy Award for Best Score Soundtrack Album for a Motion Picture, Television or Other Visual Media
