= Thrive Music =

American record label

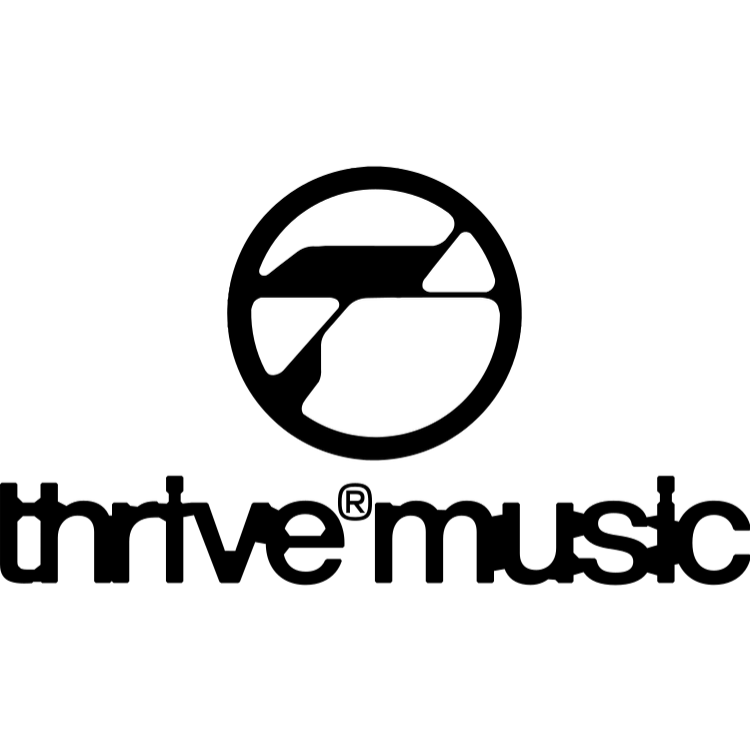
- Founded: 1997
- Founder: Ricardo Vinas
- Distributor: Virgin Music Label & Artist Services
- Genre: Electronic, Dance, Alternative
- Country of origin: United States
- Location: Los Angeles, California
- Official website: thrivemusic.com

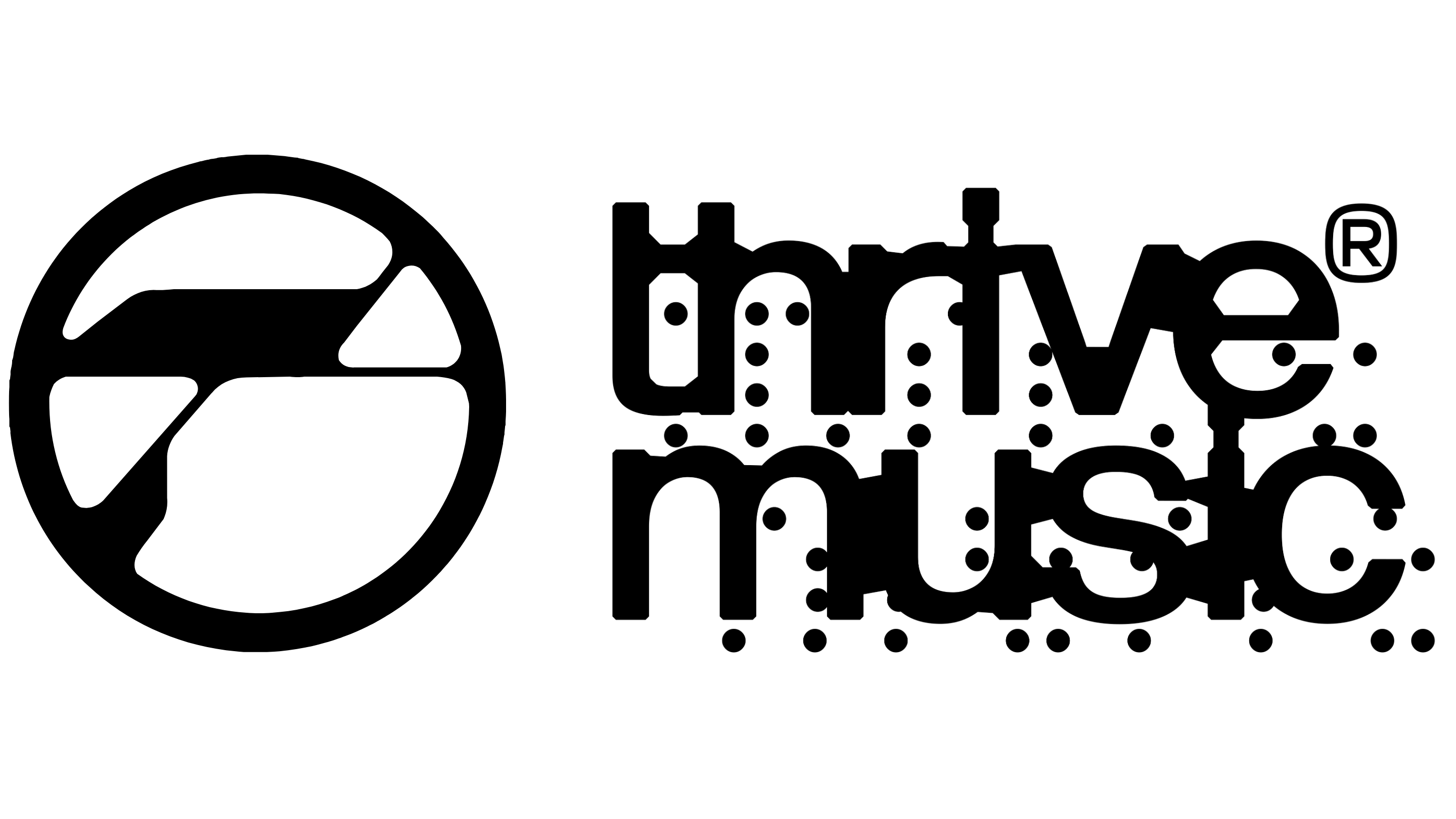
Alternate horizontal logo

Thrive Music is a United States–based record label founded in Los Angeles, California, by music industry entrepreneur Ricardo Vinas.

== History ==
Thrive Records was founded in 1997 by electronic musician Ricardo Vinas, as a joint venture with Sire/Warner Bros. Records—the label founded by Seymour Stein.

Thrive had early success in 1998 with the release of the soundtrack album for Darren Aronofsky’s Pi, and launching the premiere DJ mix series, Global Underground. The label's roster included Paul Oakenfold and Deep Dish.

Thrive Records distributed Oakenfold’s label Perfecto Records for a decade. Oakenfold received a 2006 Grammy nomination for his Thrive Records album, Creamfields.

Deep Dish released their Grammy nominated album, George Is On (2005), during their time at Thrive Records. Thrive Records' artist roster has included Roni Size, A-Trak, former Underworld member Darren Emerson, Mark Ronson, Duck Sauce, Sander Kleinenberg, Josh Wink, Ferry Corsten, and Steve Aoki.

The albums from Steve Aoki, Pillow Face and His Airplane Chronicles (2008), and A-Trak's Infinity+1 (2009), were both released by Thrive Records.

Thrive Records was active in the film soundtrack arena. In addition to Pi, Thrive Records released the soundtrack albums for the Oscar nominated Christopher Nolan film, Memento, and Requiem For a Dream directed by Darren Aronofsky.

Thrive Records signed Foo Fighter's drummer, Taylor Hawkins, and his solo band, The Coattail Riders.

The label was home to many of today's top EDM executives including former Thrive Records GM Lee Kurisu (Dim Mak Records President), and A&R executives Peter Torres and David Dann (Mind of a Genius Records GM, and Founder).

Thrive Pictures was the film and television division for Thrive Records run by Hollywood film executive Bryan Brucks.

== Distribution ==
WEA Distribution was Thrive Records distributor from 1997 until 2000. Thrive Records moved to RED Distribution/Sony Music in 2001 and ranked consistently as one of RED's top performing labels. Thrive Records provided North American distribution for several iconic European dance labels, including Perfecto Records, Renaissance Recordings, and Global Underground.

== Thrive Music ==
In 2015, after a 15-year tenure with Thrive Records, Ricardo Vinas launched Thrive Music with distribution through Sony Music. Thrive Music has released projects from established EDM artists such as Moby, Nicky Romero, Cheat Codes, and Dimitri Vegas & Like Mike. The label's roster also includes emerging artists like SAYMYNAME, Grammy-nominated Lipless, Cazztek, Sick Individuals, Dropout, 4B, Hunter Siegel, Myon, and Madison Mars.

Thrive Music's artists have had their work featured in various television shows, video games, films, and multimedia advertising campaigns. In 2017, these included the trailer for Despicable Me 3, and placements in campaigns for Mountain Dew, So You Think You Can Dance, and Dancing with the Stars.

== Artists ==
- ACRAZE
- Air
- Amba Shepherd
- Armnhmr
- A-Trak
- Bad Boy Bill
- Cheat Codes
- Clint Mansell
- Danny Tenaglia
- Darren Emerson
- Dave Seaman
- Deep Dish
- Delaney Jane
- Dimitri Vegas & Like Mike
- DJ Dan
- DJ Skribble
- Duck Sauce
- Fatboy Slim
- Ferry Corsten
- Fred Falke
- Gazzo
- Hernán Cattáneo
- Holly
- Hunter Siegel
- Infusion
- James Zabiela
- Jayceeoh
- John Digweed
- Johnny Vicious
- Jason Nevins
- Josh Wink
- Louis Vivet
- LP Giobbi
- Manse
- Mark Ronson
- Moby
- Morten
- Nervo
- Nic Fanciulli
- Nicky Romero
- Nostalgix
- Paul Oakenfold
- Regard
- Remmi
- Richard Vission
- Riot Ten
- Roni Size
- Sander Kleinenberg
- Sandra Collins
- Sasha
- Seb Fontaine
- Sick Individuals
- Steve Aoki
- Stryker
- Tamra Keenan
- Taylor Hawkins and the Coattail Riders
- That Kid
- The Ready Set
- Thomas Bangalter
- Tim Deluxe
- Tommie Sunshine
- Tony Okungbowa
- Trivecta
- tyDi
- Vic Latino
- Wuki

== See also ==
- List of record labels
