= Undisputed =

Undisputed may refer to:

== Film ==
- Undisputed (film), a 2002 action-thriller-drama film
  - Undisputed (soundtrack), the soundtrack to the film
- Undisputed II: Last Man Standing, a 2006 American martial arts film
- Undisputed III: Redemption, a 2010 American martial arts film
- Boyka: Undisputed, a 2016 American–Bulgarian martial arts film

== Music ==
- Undisputed (Beenie Man album), 2006
- Undisputed (Deep Dish album), 1995
- Undisputed (DMX album), 2012
- Undisputed (Def Jam album), 2018
- Undisputed, a 2023 EP by Indo-Canadian rapper Sukha
- "Undisputed" (song), a 2008 song by Ludacris

== Television ==
- Dice: Undisputed, an American reality show on VH1
- Undisputed (TV series), a sports talk show

== Video games ==
- A series of MMA games under the UFC banner
  - UFC 2009 Undisputed
  - UFC Undisputed 2010
  - UFC Undisputed 3
- Undisputed (video game), a 2024 boxing video game

== See also ==
- Undisputed championship (disambiguation)
