= Junk Science (disambiguation) =

Junk Science is spurious or fraudulent scientific data, research, or analysis.

Junk Science may also refer to:

- Junk Science (book), 2022 book by M. Chris Fabricant
- Junk Science (album), 1998 album by Deep Dish
- JunkScience Blog, a blog written by Steven Milloy

== See also ==
- List of pseudoscience and junk science websites
- Garbology, the scientific study of junk or garbage
