= Undisputed (Deep Dish album) =

Compilation album (mixtape)
- Released: 1995
- Genre: Progressive house
- Length: 56:00
- Label: Slip 'n' Slide
- Producer: Deep Dish
- Compiler: Deep Dish

Undisputed is a DJ mix album compiled and produced by Deep Dish (Dubfire and Sharam) for Slip 'n' Slide.

== Track listing ==
No.	Title	Artist	Length
1.	"Love Evolution"	Agua Negra	5:31
2.	"Come Back"	DC Deepressed	6:46
3.	"Feel It"	TNT	4:30
4.	"Fire"	BB Boogie Association	6:15
5.	"Alright"	Ray Roc & Juan Kato	7:45
6.	"More"	Agua Negra	7:06
7.	"Hi Line"	Basic Soul	6:32
8.	"Real Good"	Grand Central	2:56
9.	"Shake What You Got"	95 North	3:08
10.	"Let Me In"	95 North	5:20
11.	"Hideaway" (Deep Dish Remix)	De'Lacy	6:26
12.	"Hideaway" (Sharam's Journey To Mars)	De'Lacy	5:54
13.	"About You"	Loosse featuring Yolanda Reynolds	1:47
14.	"Supernatural"	Firefly featuring Ursula Rucker	6:00
Total length:			56:00
