= Get Wild (album) =

Studio album by Sharam
- Released: February 17, 2009
- Genre: House
- Length: 76:43 (Limited edition: 147:37)
- Label: Ultra
- Producer: Sharam Tayebi

Sharam chronology
Get Wild (2009)	Live at Warung Beach Brasil (2011)

Alternative cover
- Limited collectors edition cover

Professional ratings
Review scores
Source	Rating
In the Mix	Favourable
URB	4/5 stars

Get Wild is the début solo album by Iranian-American house DJ Sharam, one half of the Grammy award-winning DJ/production duo, Deep Dish; released on the February 17, 2009 through Ultra Records. The album was led by the single “She Came Along” featuring vocals from American singer and rapper Kid Cudi.

== Track listing ==
No.	Title	Writer(s)	Length
1.	"The Wild Theme"	Sharam	2:27
2.	"She Came Along"	Sharam, Scott Mescudi	5:35
3.	"Don't Say a Word"	Anoushesh Khalili, Sharam	6:53
4.	"Get Wild"	Mario Vasquez, Sharam	6:57
5.	"Sweat"	Tommy lee, Sharam	9:00
6.	"The One (Downtempo),(Original)"	Daniel Bedingfield, Sharam	6:38
7.	"Be the Change"	Khalili, Tayebi	8:06
8.	"Texi"	Tayebi	8:01
9.	"I Love the Way" (That You're Breaking My Heart)	Richard Morel, Tayebi	8:27
10.	"Duck, You Sucker"	Tayebi	4:14
11.	"P.A.T.T. with Diddy"	Rick James, Tayebi	6:00
12.	"Once Upon a Time in the West"	Tayebi	4:29
Total length:			76:43

=== Limited collectors edition ===
Disc 1 - Wild Dish
No.	Title	Writer(s)	Length
1.	"The Wild Theme"	Tayebi	2:28
2.	"She Came Along"	Burch, Mescudi, Tayebi, Tillis	5:34
3.	"Don't Say a Word..."	Khalili, Tayebi	6:52
4.	"Get Wild"	De Grate, Hailey, Noble, Tayebi	7:12
5.	"Kill" (Techno)	Lee, Tayebi	9:25
6.	"Secret Parkway"	Bedingfield, Tayebi	6:32
7.	"Sweat"	Khalili, Lee, Tayebi	8:38
8.	"The One"	Bedingfield, Tayebi	7:50
9.	"Crazi"	Morel, Tayebi	8:43
10.	"Be the Change" (Dub)	Khalili, Tayebi	8:37
11.	"Say Yeah"	James, Aldo Marin, Carlton Ridenhour, Tayebi	5:22
Total length:			77:13

Disc 2 - Side Dish
No.	Title	Writer(s)	Length
1.	"Be the Change"	Khalili, Tayebi	6:57
2.	"Quarterback"	Tayebi	5:33
3.	"I Love the Way" (That You're Breaking My Heart)	Morel, Tayebi	9:26
4.	"Texi"	Tayebi	8:29
5.	"The Track with No Name"	Nic Fanciulli, Tayebi	5:16
6.	"Wall.E"	Tayebi	8:39
7.	"Secret Dubway"	Tayebi	4:59
8.	"Duck, You Sucker"	Tayebi	5:34
9.	"P.A.T.T. with Diddy"	James, Tayebi	7:02
10.	"The One" (Downtempo)	Bedingfield, Tayebi	3:59
11.	"Once Upon a Time in the West"	Tayebi	4:30
Total length:			70:24
