= Industrial Development Group =

Industrial Development Group - IDG is the fruit of the Egyptian Government recent reforms that have been directed towards facilitating investment procedures, attracting more local, Arab and foreign enterprises to Egypt. To encourage this trend, the Government of Egypt has assigned an area of land for Industrial Parks featuring diversified businesses.

== The start ==
Under the EU-Egypt association agreement, Egypt is currently implementing an Industrial modernization program, which seeks to raise the competitive edge of local products as well as help the Egyptian industrial sector integrate into global economy. In addition to creating more work opportunities, the program proposes to multiply state revenues by increasing exports.

== projects ==
- Engineering Square (Industrial Park)
- East Port Said Industrial Zone
