= Gazzo (producer) =

American DJ

- Born: Michael Gazzo; January 21, 1990 (age 36); Livingston, New Jersey, U.S.
- Genres: Dance; pop
- Instruments: DAW; bass; guitar; piano; drums
- Labels: Casablanca; Island; UMG Italy; Dreamwave Recordings; Armada

Michael Gazzo (born 21 January 1990), known professionally as Gazzo, is an American DJ, record producer, songwriter, and multi-instrumentalist. Gazzo has written songs across a wide array of styles and for many different artists but is most known for his pop-driven house and dance records. Gazzo grew up in West Caldwell, New Jersey, lived in Baltimore, Maryland, from 2008 to 2013, and now shares time between his house in Los Angeles and a Hoboken, New Jersey apartment.

Gazzo is a pop writer/producer who has cuts with Steve Aoki, Nicky Jam, BTS, Kiiara, Desiigner, Backstreet Boys, Chase Rice, American Authors, Pusha T, and more. He is also currently working with up and coming artists NIKI (88rising), CADE (Ultra), Maty Noyes (Caroline Records), and sad alex (Red Bull Records). Gazzo is best known for his remix of "Best Day of My Life", which collected 50 Mil streams and helped the record go double platinum. He has also done remix work for Fall Out Boy, Ellie Goulding, Jessie J, Billie Eilish, AJR, and many others.

In 2014, Gazzo remixed the song "Best Day of My Life" by American Authors which was certified triple platinum. He went on to have several major artists seek him out for remixes, including Ariana Grande, Fall Out Boy, Billie Eilish. Gazzo has collaborated on remixes with Cash Cash, and has hit #1 on Hype Machine seven times. As a result, Gazzo was chosen as a featured artist on Billboard's "Next Big Sound" indicator.

== Early life ==
Gazzo was born in Livingston, New Jersey, initially lived in Towaco, New Jersey and at a young age moved to West Caldwell, New Jersey where he began playing upright bass. After moving on to bass guitar, drums, and guitar, he joined and performed with several different bands throughout middle school and high school. Gazzo performed with Children of Bodom at what used to be called Nokia Theater (now PlayStation Theater). He has also played a headlining show at CBGB with Axes for Blackwell, which was his metal band. Gazzo began teaching himself production at 16, and officially began producing in 2011, five years later.

Gazzo would go on to attend college at Towson University where he saw his interest in music turn from a hobby to a career. Gazzo played shows with Tiesto, Steve Aoki, Laidback Luke, Chris Lake, and many other artists, as well as at EDC New York and Las Vegas. Gazzo has officially done 3 or 4 Vapasana Meditation retreats.

He has his cheat days on Sundays and on April 19, 2020, he ran a total of 13 miles even after he decided to only run 2 miles to begin with.

== Career ==
Gazzo first released "Inspire" featuring Farewell Luna in 2013, quickly followed by his Cage EP, which has been remixed by Jai Wolf and others. Shortly after, he partnered with Kalkutta to remix "We Can't Stop" by Miley Cyrus.

=== 2013–2017 ===
In 2013, Gazzo gained recognition when "Never Touch The Ground" hit #1 on the Hype Machine Popular Charts less than 24 hours after release, went viral on YouTube and SoundCloud, and was ultimately added to Sirius XM's BPM as a "BPM Breaker". In March 2014 Island Def Jam released his remix for American Authors "Best Day Of My Life" which collected fifty million streams on Spotify. After his first international tour, Gazzo signed to Casablanca Republic Records in October 2014. He was then commissioned to do remixes for Fall Out Boy, Ariana Grande, 2 Chainz/Macklemore, Jessie J, Ellie Goulding, and others. His remix of "Centuries" for Fall Out Boy was played on ESPN College Game Day.

While at Casablanca Records Gazzo released "Sun Turns Cold" with country star Chase Rice, "Rewind" with Kap Slap, "Wasted Love" with Lush & Simon, and "What You Waiting For" with Sugarwhiskey. He also remixed "Hanging Tree", a song from The Hunger Games featuring lyrics and vocals from Jennifer Lawrence.

In 2016, Casablanca Records partnered with Jagermeister for the "Gazzo Evolution" series. Gazzo released a 4-track EP under the same name, Evolution, which was followed by a tour. Later that year, Gazzo remixed "Carol of the Bells" for Jägermeister's Christmas themed vinyl Meister the Holidays.

In 2017, Gazzo co-wrote and composed "Gunshy" with Imanos featuring Pusha T. In May, Gazzo collaborated on Aja9 Radio Disney chart-topping song "Heart Won't Beat". That fall, in collaboration with American Authors, Gazzo released "Good Ol' Boys". Gazzo was a co-writer with Steve Aoki and Lauren Jauregui on "All Night".

Gazzo has also had major music licenses issued to T-Mobile, Boost Mobile, and the movie XXX: Return of Xander Cage.

=== 2018–present ===
In 2018, Gazzo began to transition from an electronic artist to a producer/writer, as he stopped touring and began writing and producing for other artists. Gazzo's latest release, a remix of "Six Feet Under" by Billie Eilish, quickly collected millions of streams.

As of late, Gazzo has produced tracks for various artists including desiigner, CADE, Lindsey Stirling, Skylar Stecker, Sammy Adams, and Yoe Mase & Maejor. Since then, Gazzo has also developed new acts including sad alex, aja9, Aidan Alexander, and Emily Vaughn.

In 2018, Yoe Mase's album Soldier hit #18 album on iTunes Alternative charts.

In 2019 Aja9's singles "Treat YoSelf" and "Heart Won't Beat" were both top ten on Radio Disney charts. He also partnered with Red Bull's publishing division 'Toro Rosso Tracks', and signed artist sad alex for production.

In 2019 and 2020, Gazzo did a campaign with Orange Theory Fitness, where he produced a few dozen songs for their 'Year In Review Campaign'.

== Discography and credits ==
=== Original music ===
Year	Title	Artist(s)	Contribution
2013	Cage	Gazzo	Artist, Writer, Producer, Mix Engineer
2013	Inspire	Gazzo, Farewell Luna	Artist, Writer, Producer, Mix Engineer
2013	Gold Rush (Cash Cash & Gazzo Remix)	Clinton Sparks, 2 Chainz, Macklemore	Remixer
2013	On & On (Cash Cash & Gazzo Remix)	Sharam, Anousheh	Remixer
2014	C'Mon Freaks	Gazzo, Damien Anthony	Artist, Writer, Producer, Mix Engineer
2014	Follow Me	Gazzo, Disco Fries, Jones	Artist, Writer, Producer, Mix Engineer
2014	Forth & Back	Gazzo, WILL K, Kyle Richardson	Artist, Writer, Producer, Mix Engineer
2014	Six Point Five	Gazzo, Matt Goldman	Artist, Writer, Producer, Mix Engineer
2014	Stars	Gazzo, Matt Goldman	Artist, Writer, Producer, Mix Engineer
2014	Best Day Of My Life (Gazzo Remix)	American Authors	Remixer
2014	Burnin' Up (Gazzo Remix)	Jessie J, 2 Chainz, Gazzo	Remixer
2014	Centuries (Gazzo Remix)	Fall Out Boy	Remixer
2014	Free (Cash Cash & Gazzo Remix)	Rudimental, Emeli Sandé	Remixer
2014	I Was A Fool (Gazzo Remix)	Tegan and Sara	Remixer
2014	We're The Kids (Cash Cash & Gazzo Remix)	Parade of Lights	Remixer
2015	Never Touch The Ground	Gazzo, Y LUV	Artist, Writer, Producer, Mix Engineer
2015	Rewind	Gazzo, Kap Slap	Artist, Writer, Producer, Mix Engineer
2015	Sun Turns Cold	Gazzo	Artist, Writer, Producer, Mix Engineer
2015	Cha Cha (Gazzo Remix)	Dram	Remixer
2015	Feel The Love (Gazzo Remix)	Tigerlily, Nat Dunn	Remixer
2015	Lose Myself (Gazzo Remix)	Seven Lions, Lynn Gunn	Remixer
2015	Love Me Like You Do (Gazzo Remix)	Ellie Goulding	Remixer
2015	Somebody (Gazzo Remix)	Natalie La Rose	Remixer
2015	Something About You (Gazzo Remix)	Hayden James	Remixer
2016	Driftin'	Gazzo, Y LUV	Artist, Writer, Producer, Mix Engineer
2016	Gone	Gazzo, Disco Fries	Artist, Writer, Producer, Mix Engineer
2016	Long Way Home	Gazzo, Allie Crystal	Artist, Writer, Producer, Mix Engineer
2016	Love Drunk	Gazzo, Matt McAndrew	Artist, Writer, Producer, Mix Engineer
2016	Nothing To Lose	Gazzo, Scott Chesak	Artist, Writer, Producer, Mix Engineer
2016	Wasted Love	Gazzo, Lush & Simon, Robbie Rosen	Artist, Writer, Producer, Mix Engineer
2016	What You Waiting For	Gazzo	Artist, Writer, Producer, Mix Engineer
2016	Wake (E-Bow) (Gazzo Remix)	Crywolf	Remixer
2016	Way Up (Gazzo Remix)	Wood	Remixer
2017	Good Ol' Boys	Gazzo, American Authors	Artist, Writer, Producer, Mix Engineer
2017	Heart Won't Beat	Gazzo, Aja9	Artist, Writer, Producer, Mix Engineer
2017	Holdin' On	Gazzo, Raj Chrome	Artist, Writer, Producer, Mix Engineer
2017	Waterfall	Gazzo	Artist, Writer, Producer, Mix Engineer
2017	Six Feet Under (Gazzo Remix)	Billie Eilish	Remixer
2017	Sunday Finest (Gazzo Remix)	Sir Rosevelt	Remixer
2017	Weak (Gazzo Remix)	AJR	Remixer
2018	How you Like Me	Gazzo	Artist, Writer, Producer, Mix Engineer
2018	Hold Me Down (Gazzo Remix)	Family Of The Year	Remixer

=== Other contributions ===
Year	Title	Artist(s)	Contribution
2015	Come To California	Caroline D'Amore	Writer, Producer, Mix Engineer
2017	Do It...The Way I Do It	Black Caviar	Mix Engineer
2017	Gunshy	Imanos, Pusha T, Karen Harding	Writer, Producer
2017	Home For The Holidays	Lindsey Stirling	Producer, Mix Engineer
2017	Hung Up	alxxa	Writer, Producer, Mix Engineer
2017	Nobody	alxxa	Writer, Producer, Mix Engineer
2017	Pistol	alxxa	Writer, Producer, Mix Engineer
2017	Stardust	Emily Zeck	Writer, Producer, Mix Engineer
2017	Umbrella	alxxa	Writer, Producer, Mix Engineer
2018	All Night	Steve Aoki, Lauren Jauregui	Writer, Mix Engineer
2018	Aura	Janine The Machine	Producer, Mix Engineer
2018	Be Somebody	Steve Aoki, Kiiara, Nicky Romero	Writer, Mix Engineer
2018	body	alxxa	Writer, Producer, Mix Engineer
2018	burn to dust	alxxa	Writer, Producer, Mix Engineer
2018	Circles	Yoe Mase	Writer, Producer, Mix Engineer
2018	Falling	Yoe Mase	Writer, Producer, Mix Engineer
2018	Forest Fire	Yoe Mase	Writer, Producer, Mix Engineer
2018	Give It All	Emily Zeck	Writer, Producer, Mix Engineer
2018	graffiti	SAMAHTA	Writer, Producer, Mix Engineer
2018	Homeless	Yoe Mase	Writer, Producer, Mix Engineer
2018	icy love	alxxa	Writer, Producer, Mix Engineer
2018	I've Been A Liar	Yoe Mase	Writer, Producer, Mix Engineer
2018	Jaleo	Steve Aoki, Nicky Jam	Writer, Mix Engineer
2018	Limbo	Aja9	Writer, Producer, Mix Engineer
2018	Make a Move	ChrisLee	Producer, Mix Engineer
2018	Oh Lord	Yoe Mase	Writer, Producer, Mix Engineer
2018	Oracle	Janine The Machine	Producer, Mix Engineer
2018	professional	SAMAHTA	Writer, Producer, Mix Engineer
2018	Prove Me Wrong	Yoe Mase	Writer, Producer, Mix Engineer
2018	rearview	alxxa	Writer, Producer, Mix Engineer
2018	Reiki	Janine The Machine	Producer, Mix Engineer
2018	Say The Word	Emily Vaughn, Lostboycrow	Writer, Producer, Mix Engineer
2018	secret weapon	SAMAHTA	Writer, Producer, Mix Engineer
2018	Soldier Pt. 1	Yoe Mase	Writer, Producer, Mix Engineer
2018	Soldier Pt. 2	Yoe Mase	Writer, Producer, Mix Engineer
2018	Steve Aoki, BTS	Waste It On Me	Writer, Mix Engineer
2018	swerve	alxxa	Writer, Producer, Mix Engineer
2018	Take Cover	Yoe Mase	Writer, Producer, Mix Engineer
2018	Treat Yo Self	Aja9	Writer, Producer, Mix Engineer
2018	Do It...The Way I Do It	Black Caviar	Mix Engineer
2018	Freak Like Me	Black Caviar	Mix Engineer
2018	Pretender	Steve Aoki, AJR, Lil Yatchy	Mix Engineer
2018	Freak Like Me	Black Caviar	Mix Engineer
2018	Kill Shit Funk	Black Caviar	Mix Engineer
2019	Alright Alright, Okay	Black Caviar	Mix Engineer
2019	Be Alright Forever	Alex Aoino	Writer, Producer, Mix Engineer
2019	Better Off Alone	Cade	Writer, Producer, Mix Engineer
2019	Boing	Black Caviar	Mix Engineer
2019	Common People	Edo Ferragamo	Producer, Mix Engineer
2019	dear whaterver	sad alex	Writer, Producer, Mix Engineer
2019	Do You Like It When I'm Freaky?	Black Caviar	Mix Engineer
2019	El Camino	Black Caviar	Mix Engineer
2019	Fire	Skylar Stecker	Writer, Producer
2019	good stuff	sad alex	Writer, Producer, Mix Engineer
2019	Guts	Aidan Alexander	Writer, Producer, Mix Engineer
2019	Heartbeat	Marat Leon, Matt McAndrew	Writer, Producer, Mix Engineer
2019	Hit Your Heart	Dagny, Steve Aoki	Writer, Mix Engineer
2019	Hollywood smile	SAMAHTA	Writer, Producer, Mix Engineer
2019	Home To U	CADE, desiigner	Writer, Producer, Mix Engineer
2019	Jealous	Emily Vaughn	Writer, Producer, Mix Engineer
2019	Kubrick Faked The Moon Landing	Black Caviar	Mix Engineer
2019	Let It Be Me	Steve Aoki, Backstreet Boys	Writer
2019	light u up	SAMAHTA	Writer, Producer, Mix Engineer
2019	Pieces	Emily Vaughn	Writer, Producer, Mix Engineer
2019	routine	sad alex	Writer, Producer, Mix Engineer
2019	Shouldn't Couldn't Wouldn't	Niki, Rich Brian	Writer, Producer, Mix Engineer
2019	Shouldn't, Wouldn't, Couldn't	Niki & Rich Brian	Writer, Producer, Mix Engineer
2019	Slippin	Black Caviar, Anthony & Cleopatra	Mix Engineer
2019	Snatched	Janine The Machine	Producer, Mix Engineer
2019	Spit It Out	AJA9	Writer, Producer, Mix Engineer
2019	Toot	desiigner	Mix Engineer
2019	Us	Aja9	Writer, Producer, Mix Engineer
2019	Wate It All	AJA9	Writer, Producer, Mix Engineer
2019	What's Up Danger (Remix)	Black Caviar	Mix Engineer
2019	Zonin	Black Caviar	Mix Engineer
2020	1 4 U	Steve Aoki & Zooey Deschanel	Writer
2020	all the way over	sad alex	Writer, Producer, Mix Engineer
2020	Cut You Loose	Steve Aoki & Matthew Koma	Writer
2020	New Blood	Steve Aoki & Sydney Sierota	Writer
2020	Wash Your Hands	Sad Alex, Gnash & Roken	
