= Nic Fanciulli =

English electronic musician

- Born: Nicholas Anthony Fanciulli
- Origin: Maidstone, Kent, England
- Genres: House, tech house, electronic
- Years active: 2003–present
- Label: Saved
- Website: www.nicfanciulli.com

Nicholas Anthony Fanciulli (born August 25, 1979, in Maidstone, Kent), known professionally as Nic Fanciulli, is an electronic musician, DJ and label owner.

== Early life ==
Fanciulli was born to an Italian father and a British mother in Maidstone, Kent. He spent his early childhood in Kent, Kenya, Italy and South London before the family settled in Maidstone, Kent.

== Career ==
Fanciulli began his career in music at Plastic Surgery Records, Maidstone where he worked for two years in the early 2000s. Inspired by Laurent Garnier he began to DJ, handing out demo tapes to local promoters in Maidstone. Among them was Sergio (Serge) Bienati, promoter of well-known local event brand ClubClass. Nic slipped him several anonymous tapes, after receiving the third tape Serge went on a manhunt, eventually tracking Nic down and giving him his break. Serge gave Nic a residency in the main room at ClubClass at a club called Atomics when he was 19 and signed him to the Club Class booking agency in 2003.

In 1998, Fanciulli set up his own label, Portent Records, putting out his first release ‘Dockside’ (with Matt Blewett) in 2000. Releases include the Mojolators ‘Drifting’ (featuring Camilla) which was played by Pete Tong on Radio 1 for 14 consecutive weeks, eventually being licensed to Multiply Records, a sub-label of Telstar/BMG.

After he was signed to the ClubClass booking agency, Fanciulli career ascended rapidly, picking up bookings at Cream, Turnmills, Space (Ibiza and Miami), Shindig, Passion, Circus, Type, appearing at Radio 1 weekends in Ibiza, Miami and Cardiff and the Radio 1 Outdoor stage at Homelands Festival. In September 2004 he started a residency with The Gallery at Turnmills in Farringdon, London.

In 2005, he was invited to record an entry in the Renaissance mix series. Renaissance Presents Nic Fanciulli was released in October 2005, followed by Volume 2 a year later. Nic has also created mixes for Global Underground's GUDJ series, Balance and In The House (published by longstanding house label Defected).

He has produced remixes for key house labels Deep Dish, Deep Vision, Yoshitoshi and Credence, plus major labels Universal and Warner Bros. under a number of aliases including Buick Project (with songwriter and producer Andy Chatterley), Mansdisco, One + One (with James Zabiela), Skylark and The Alchemistas. Fanciulli earned a Grammy nomination for ‘Best Remixed Recording (Non-Classical)’ in 2006 for his Buick Project remix of ‘Damage’ by Tracey Thorn. He has also remixed Underworld, Fleetwood Mac, Kylie Minogue, Groove Armada, The Juan MacLean, Gorillaz, Calvin Harris & Dua Lipa, Jamie xx and U.N.K.L.E.

That same year, Fanciulli was invited to appear on Radio 1's Essential Mix, lauded by host Pete Tong. He has since appeared on the Essential Mix a further two times, once in November 2017 and again in August 2018 back-to-back with Steve Lawler live from ANTS at Ushuaïa Ibiza Beach Hotel in Ibiza. Fanciulli was also inducted into Pete Tong's Hall Of Fame in 2015.

Fanciulli also secured a year-long residency on Radio 1 in 2005, hosting his own regular show throughout the year. In 2005, Nic launched a second record label, with Andy Chatterley, called Saved. The outlet launched with ‘Chancer/Drop The Beat’ under his alias Skylark presents Buick Project. Across over 100 releases the label has signed music from artists such as Butch, James Talk, Mark Broom, Mat Playford, Joel Mull, Andrea Oliva, Uner, Steve Rachmad, Yousef, Spencer Parker, Oxia and more. The label celebrated 100 releases in 2014 with a world tour including dates in Tel Aviv, Glasgow, Hollywood and Washington D.C. Fanciulli now runs the label with his brother, Mark.

In 2017, he collaborated with Matthew Dear under his Audion pseudonym to produce 'Resistance', released on his own label Saved.

In December 2019, Fanciulli performed at the O2 London in support of Pete Tong's Ibiza Classics Show with the Heritage Orchestra, also remixing a track from the Ibiza Classics album. Nic's remix of Promised Land (a rework of the 1987 Joe Smooth classic featuring Disciples) was featured on the LP, released by Universal Music in 2018.

== Album and live show ==
Fanciulli released his 16-track debut album My Heart in 2017. The long-player features appearances from Blur frontman Damon Albarn, veteran house vocalist Jamie Principle and CONSTANCE. In 2018, he released the ‘Star’ EP on Seth Troxler’s Play It Say It with his brother Mark Fanciulli. That year he also released an edit of Lee Cabrera’s ‘Shake it’, and a remix of Calvin Harris & Dua Lipa's No.1 chart hit ‘One Kiss’, which was released on his label Saved Records.

In 2018, Fanciulli debuted a live show at Village Underground in Shoreditch, east London. My Heart Live saw Fanciulli perform all 16 tracks from his debut LP live with the aid of lighting effects by High Scream, a visuals team that also provides production for Fanciulli's Ushuaïa and Hi Ibiza shows.

== The Social Festival ==
Fanciulli founded his boutique festival, The Social in 2014. It was launched as a way to bring international electronic music artists to his hometown, Maidstone. The festival started out as a one-day event, held at Mote Park, Kent, and has now extended its run to three days.

The Social has branched out to South and Central America in 2017, with editions launched in Mexico, Colombia, Peru and Argentina.

== Discography ==
=== Albums ===
- 2017: My Heart (Saved Records)

=== Mixes and compilations ===
- 2005: Renaissance Presents Nic Fanciulli (Renaissance)
- 2006: Renaissance Presents Nic Fanciulli: Vol 2 (Renaissance)
- 2009: GUDJ Volume 01: Nic Fanciulli (Global Underground)
- 2012: Balance 021 (Balance)
- 2014: Defected in the House (In the House)

=== Singles and EPs (selected) ===
- 2003: Fanciulli & Knight - Dug It Up & Hott (Portent Records)
- 2006: Nic Fanciulli - The Squirreled EP (Renaissance)
- 2006: Nic Fanciulli - Lucky Heather & Cat Out Of The Bag (Renaissance)
- 2009: Nic Fanciulli & Steve Mac - 10% / 20% (Ovum Recordings)
- 2009: Nic Fanciulli - Dusty House I Room 3 (Rejected)
- 2009: Nic Fanciulli - Green Tea (Saved Records)
- 2010: Nic Fanciulli & Stacey Pullen - Limmo (Saved Records)
- 2011: Nic Fanciulli & Rolando - The Test (Saved Records)
- 2011: Nic Fanciulli & Gary Beck - Hear Me Out (Saved Records)
- 2012: Nic Fanciulli - Movin' On (Rejected)
- 2017: Nic Fanciulli feat. Guy Gerber - The Perfect Crime (Saved Records)
- 2018: Nic Fanciulli Feat. Damon Albarn - Saying (Saved Records)
- 2018: Nic Fanciulli, Mark Fanciulli - Star (Play It Say It)
- 2019: Nic Fanciulli - Understand (Rekids)
- 2019: Nic Fanciulli - Miracle (Body Rock) (Crosstown Rebels)
- 2023: Nic Fanciulli & Calussa - "Vente (Extended Mix)" (Defected Records)
- 2024: Nic Fanciulli - "Set Me Free" (feat Robert Courtois)

=== Remixes (selected) ===
- 2003: Matt Schwartz & Jo Mills Present 4Tune 500 - "Dancing in the Dark (Skylark Remix)" (Back Yard Recordings)
- 2004: Deepsky - "Talk Like a Stranger (Nic Fanciulli Skylark Dub Rmx)" (Yo!)
- 2004: Paul Woolford - "Mind Over Matter (Nic Fanciulli & Andy Chatterley's Skylark Remix)" (C2Trax)
- 2004: Deep Dish - "Flashdance (Nic Fanciulli & Andy Chatterley's Skylark Remix)" (Deep Dish Records)
- 2004: Michael Gray - "The Weekend (Nic Fanciulli Vocal Mix)" (Altra Moda Music)
- 2005: Timo Maas - "First Day (Buick Project Dub)" (Warner Bros.)
- 2007: The Shapeshifters - "Pusher (Nic Fanciulli Remix)" (Positiva)
- 2007: Groove Armada - "Love Sweet Sound (Nic Fanciulli Remix)" (Sony BMG)
- 2007: Unkle - "Burn My Shadow (Nic Fanciulli Remix)" (Surrender All)
- 2010: Plump DJs - "The Knife (Nic Fanciulli Remix)" (GU Music)
- 2010: Loco Dice - Definition (Nic Fanciulli Remix) (Toolroom)
- 2011: Tiefschwarz - "The Whistler (Nic Fanciulli Remix)" (Souvenir)
- 2012: Superhero - "New York (Nic Fanciulli Remix)" (Saved Records)
- 2012: Marc Romboy - "The Advent (Nic Fanciulli Remix)" (Systematic)
- 2013: Paolo Rocco - "People Say (Nic Fanciulli Remix)" (Saved Records)
- 2014: Hot Natured - "Benediction (Nic Fanciulli Remix)" (FFRR)
- 2016: Jamie xx - "SeeSaw (Nic Fanciulli Remix)" (Young Turks)
- 2017: Gorillaz featuring Vince Staples - "Ascension (Nic Fanciulli Remix)" (Parlophone)
- 2018: Calvin Harris & Dua Lipa - "One Kiss (Nic Fanciulli Remix)" (Saved Records)
- 2018: Lee Cabrera vs. Thomas Gold - "Shake It (Nic Fanciulli Edit)" (Cr2)
- 2022: B Beat Girls - "For The Same Man (Nic Fanciulli Extended Remix)" (Defected)
