= Triple Stamp Records =

Independent record label

Triple Stamp Records was an independent record label based in Richmond, Virginia. The label was created in 2004 by co-owners Wil Loyal, Christopher Carroll, and Adrienne Brown, and closed in 2013. It had digital distribution through The Orchard.

== Bands ==
- Anousheh Khalili
- David Shultz and The Skyline
- Homemade Knives
- Jonathan Vassar and The Speckled Bird
- Mermaid Skeletons
- Ophelia
