= Sharam =

Iranian techno and house DJ and producer

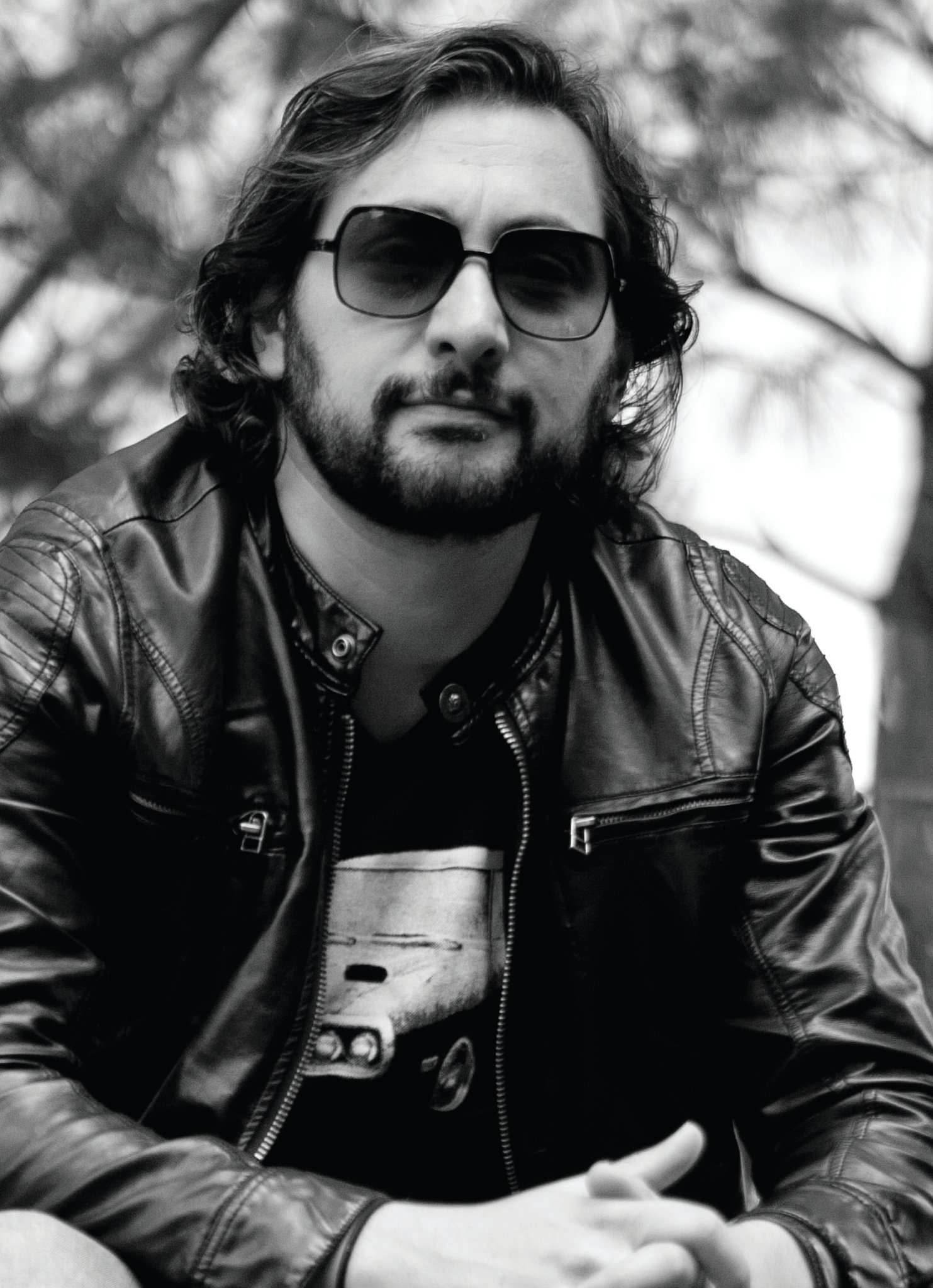

Background information
- Born: Sharam Tayebi; August 12, 1970 (age 56); Tehran, Iran
- Genres: Electronic, house
- Occupations: DJ, remixer, producer
- Years active: 1992–present
- Labels: Ultra, Yoshitoshi, Spinnin'
- Website: www.sharam.com

Sharam Tayebi (Persian: شهرام طیبی, born August 12, 1970), better known as Sharam, is an Iranian techno and house DJ and producer. Born in Tehran, Iran, he emigrated to Washington D.C. at the age of 14. A mainstay of the Washington underground dance music scene, he has been active both as one half of the duo Deep Dish and solo artist, producer and mixer.

As part of Deep Dish, with Ali "Dubfire" Shirazinia, Sharam released two albums and produced or remixed a library of other releases including those from Janet Jackson, Stevie Nicks, Rolling Stones as well as others. The duo received a Grammy nomination for their remix of Madonna's "Music" and won the "Best Remixed Recording" Grammy for their remix of Dido's "Thank You.” Deep Dish were nominated two times for their George Is On album—Best Single ("Say Hello") and Best Remix ("Flashdance" remixed by David Guetta).

As a solo artist, Sharam released two of his own albums and six mix compilations and produced or mixed fourteen other artists such as Bruno Mars, Coldplay, Steve Aoki, Shakira and more.

Sharam is known for his house hits “Party All the Time”, "The One" with Daniel Bedingfield, "Don’t Say A Word" with Anousheh, "She Came Along" with Kid Cudi, “My Way” featuring Honey Honey and more.

Also in 2009, Sharam won BBC Radio 1 Essential Mix of the Year picked from 52 other mixes by his peers.

== Early life and history ==
Sharam Tayebi was born in Iran and at age 14, he and his family settled in Washington D.C. It was in this city that he discovered dance music and developed skills as a producer, DJ and musician.

Back in the 1990s of Washington, DC, Sharam Tayebi met Ali "Dubfire" Shirazinia, also an Iranian immigrant, and together in 1992 formed Deep Dish. Their music was a mix of deep house and techno, with industrial and rock influences. The two formed an eponymous record label as well as Yoshitoshi Records and, upon meeting Danny Tenaglia, released their music and imprints on Tribal America label.

Sharam Tayebi remains a mainstay of the Washington underground music scene, and "has been an instrumental figure in house and techno music as a DJ, producer and one-half of the duo, Deep Dish,"according to DJ Tech Tools.

== Career ==
=== 1995–2004: Deep Dish ===
As Deep Dish, Sharam and his musical partner Dubfire released their debut album, Penetrate Deeper in 1995. Three years later came Junk Science, featuring a collaboration with Everything But The Girl's Tracey Thorn. This track, called "Future of the Future (Stay Gold) debuted on the UK charts at #37.

Between 1999 and 2003, Deep Dish released six DJ mix compilations including:Cream Separates, Yoshiesque, Global Underground Moscow, Yoshiesque 2, Renaissance Ibiza and Global Underground Toronto.

=== 2004–2006: George Is On ===
On July 12, 2005, Deep Dish released George Is On, which became their last album together for years. The album was proceeded by the single, "Flashdance," which went to #3 in the UK, and remained in the Top 10 for four weeks in 2004. Two other singles, "Say Hello" and "Dreams" with Stevie Nicks both debuted at 14 in the UK.

George Is On and its singles were nominated for three Grammy Awards including Best Electronic Album, Best Single for "Say Hello" and Best Remix (David Guetta's remix of "Flashdance").

=== 2006–2009: post-Deep Dish ===
Sharam split from Dubfire and Deep Dish in 2006, and launched his solo career with the release of his own Global Underground mix compilation Dubai GU29 on October 17. Sharam toured North America prior to the street date of GU29.

That same year, Sharam also released “P.A.T.T. (Party All The Time),” a cover of the Eddie Murphy and Rick James hit from 1985. His version contained vocals by P. Diddy. The track became the most sought-after record of 2006 Winter Music Conference in Miami, as well as one of the biggest club records of the year. It debuted in the UK national charts at #8 on New Year's Eve 2006, stayed in the top 10 for 3 weeks and remained in the top 40 for 8 weeks.

=== 2009–2014: Get Wild and Night & Day ===
On May 5, 2009, Sharam's single, "She Came Along", led off his solo album, Get Wild which hit stores February 17, 2009. The song, featuring American hip-hop recording artist Kid Cudi, became a Top 20 international hit. Get Wild was a concept album inspired by Sergio Leone spaghetti westerns, featured Daniel Bedingfield, Public Enemy’s Chuck D, and Mötley Crüe’s Tommy Lee, and rose up the US club charts. Its release coincided with an international tour which took Sharam to locations such as Australia. That double album consisted of 24 originally produced tracks mixed together like a compilation.

Next, from his Mach EP series, a series of tracks were released, the two most notable being “M.I.T.T.” with Shakira and “Fun” written by Chris Martin of Coldplay.

Sharam released Live from Warung, Brazil in 2011, a compilation featuring a live set from Itajay, Brazil. The mix was first featured on BBC Radio 1's Essential Mix before being released as this compilation.

On July 17, 2012, five years after his last mix compilation, Sharam released a two-disc set called Night and Day. Based on the concept that people want to listen to music at different times—a dance party at night; a pool party during the day—the mix compilation took a “big festival” and “small club” approach.

=== 2014–2016: Deep Dish reunion, Spinnin' Deep and Retroactive ===
In 2014, Sharam and Dubfire reunited Deep Dish, playing gigs in selected cities and recording new material, at the same time maintaining their solo work. Their first, new joint release in eight years was the single, "Quincy," which came out March 31, 2014 and musically reflected the diverse paths these two took in their hiatus.

Two years later, Sharam released his next solo album, Retroactive. Originally entitled A Warehouse, with its new title, the album debuted on the iTunes Dance Top 10 on its release day June 10, 2016. Paying homage to his musical history and influences from as far back as the '80s to the drum 'n bass of today, Sharam featured songs with collaborators like disco producer Giorgio Moroder, singer-songwriter Daniel Bedingfield, frequent vocal collaborator Anousheh, Chance Caspian and Alex Neri.

The single, "August House" was released 2015 on Spinnin' Deep Records, with "August Dub" superseding it that month. The followup, "October House" was released that month on Spinnin' Deep, with "Octodub" following on Yoshitoshi Records.

In conjunction with his new album, Sharam hit the road for the "Retroactive Tour," beginning in San Diego in June and finishing in San Antonio at the end of August. Planned stops also include Mexico and Canada and is followed by a show in Ibiza, Spain.

=== 2017: Collecti ===
In 2017, Sharam released Collecti, an album that marked a return to his techno-influenced roots. The album was released throughout the summer as three separate EP's each containing four original tracks, followed by a full album with a DJ mix version and bonus content in October. Collecti debuted in the Top 20 on iTunes Dance chart and showcased a total of fifteen original tracks, some of which were compiled from previous releases but most of which were created for the album. Sharam said of the album's creation: "These records are my dance floor experiments, my secret weapons, tracks that have been driving my sets."

The album was followed by a tour that included dates in Europe and North America and a free master class at Los Angeles's IO Academy, where Sharam talked with students about the creation and production of some of the tracks on Collecti.

Of Collecti Billboard wrote: "Collecti (Part 3) consists of four pulsating cuts that lean more Detroit than Berlin and exhibit hypnotic percussion patterns alongside head-bobbing grooves." Mixmag said that the album's track "Melodi" was, "a sophisticated, swelling tune that bounces from stripped back rises to bass-driven breakdowns."

== Discography ==
=== Studio albums ===
- Get Wild (2009)
- Retroactive (2016)
- Collecti (2017)

=== Compilations ===
- Cream Separates (1997)
- Global Underground: Toronto (2003)
- Global Underground: Dubai (2006)
- Live at Warung Beach Brasil (2011)
- Night & Day(2012)
- Yoshitoshi Ibiza (2016)

=== Singles ===
- "PATT" (Party All The Time) (2006)
- "The One" feat. Daniel Bedingfield (2007)
- "PATT" (Party All The Time) feat. Diddy (2008)
- "Secret Parkway" (2008)
- "Get Wild" (2008)
- "Texi" (2008)
- "Crazi" (2008)
- "She Came Along" feat. Kid Cudi (2009)
- "Don't Say a Word" feat. Anousheh Khalili (2010)
- "Fun" feat. Anousheh (2011)
- "God Always" (2011)
- "Que Cubano" (2011)
- "Our Love" feat. Anousheh Khalili (2012)
- "Radio G" (Day Mix) (2012)
- "Radio G" (Night Mix) (2012)
- "On & On" (feat. Anousheh) (2013)
- "My Way" (feat. Honey Honey) (2013)
- "Tripi" (feat. Manfred Mann's Earth Band) (2014)
- "August House" (2015)
- "HEAVi" (2015)
- "October House" (2015)
- "Octodub" (2016)

=== Mach EP Series ===
- "Mach 1" (2010) – "Love, Love, Love" & "Hemi"
- "Mach 2" (2010) – "M.I.T.T." & "One Night"
- "Mach 3" (2011) – "Fun" (Funhouse Mix) & "Fun" (Dubhouse Mix)

=== Collecti EPs ===
- Collecti (Part 1) (2017)
- Collecti (Part 2) (2017)
- Collecti (Part 3) (2017)

=== Remixes ===
- Richard Grey – "Tainted Love" (2007)
- David Guetta – "Tomorrow Can Wait" (2008)
- Timos Mass – "Subtellite" (2008)
- DBN – "Asteroidz" (2009)
- Sharam feat. Kid Cudi – "She Came Along" (Sharam's Ecstasy of Club Remix) (2010)
- Steve Aoki – "I'm In The House" (2010)
- Sharam – "Don't Say a Word" (Sharam's Own Remix) (2010)
- King Britt – "Now" feat. Astrid Suryanto (2010)
- Shakira – "Waka, Waka" (2010)
- Sharam feat. Anousheh – "Fun" (Sharam's Own Remix) (2011)
- Pig & Dan – "Detonate" (2011)
- Bruno Mars – "Treasure" (2013)
- Carl Cox – "Family Guy" (Sharam Crazi Remix) (2013)
- Cedric Gervais – "Love Again" (Sharam Acid Remix) (2015)
- Kings of Tomorrow – "I Want You (For Myself)" (Sharam's Playa Remix) (2016)
- Sharam – "My Way" (Unreleased Dub) (2016)
- Coldplay – "Midnight" (2016)

=== Music videos ===
- "PATT" (Party All The Time) feat Diddy
- "The One" feat. Daniel Bedingfield
- "She Came Along" feat. Kid Cudi (directed by Sharam)
- "Fun" feat. Anousheh (co-directed by Sharam)
