= Sacramento (song) =

Single by Deep Dish

from the album George Is On
- Released: 2005
- Recorded: 2004
- Genre: House, rock
- Length: 5:04
- Label: Thrive; EMI; Positiva

Deep Dish singles chronology
"Say Hello" (2005)	"Sacramento" (2005)	"Flashing For Money" (2005)

"Sacramento" is a song by Deep Dish.

== Composition ==
Vocal collaborator Richard Morel provides "distinctively smoky tones" in the song. According to Jack Smith of BBC, the song derives of the musical genre of rock. David Jeffries of Allmusic noted the presence of a "guitar-heavy" sound.

== Response ==
=== Critical reception ===
"Sacramento" received positive reviews from music critics. Ben Hogwood of musicOMH called it excellent and described it as a "faster paced house work out". David Jeffries of Allmusic wrote that the song is a representation of "one of the best cuts" to come from the relationship between Deep Dish and Morel.

=== Chart performance ===
"Sacramento" peaked at number nine on the Finnish Singles Chart, becoming Deep Dish's second consecutive top-ten hit in Finland. It entered the singles chart in the Netherlands at number 56 and peaked at number 53 four weeks later.

== Track listings ==
- Album version
1. "Sacramento" - 5:04

== Charts ==
Chart performance for "Sacramento"
Chart (2005)	Peak position
Australia (ARIA)	61
Finland (Suomen virallinen lista)	9
Netherlands (Single Top 100)	53
