= George Is On =

Studio album by Deep Dish
- Released: July 12, 2005
- Genre: Electronic; progressive house
- Length: 72:00
- Label: Thrive; Positiva; EMI

Deep Dish chronology
Junk Science (1998)	George Is On (2005)

Singles from George Is On
- 1. "Flashdance" Released: 2004; 2. "Say Hello" Released: July 2, 2005; 3. "Sacramento" Released: 2006; 4. "Dreams" Released: 2006

Professional ratings
Review scores
Source	Rating
AllMusic	link

International version cover

George is On is the second album by American dance music duo Deep Dish. It features their Billboard Hot Dance Club Play chart hit "Flashdance" (which features Anousheh Khalili and is also their biggest UK chart hit, reaching No. 3), as well as a remake of the classic Fleetwood Mac song "Dreams", for which Stevie Nicks provided new vocals. "Say Hello", the second single released from the album, reached number one on the US dance chart in September 2005, becoming their second dance chart-topper (their first being "The Future of the Future (Stay Gold)", a collaboration with Everything but the Girl from 1998).

== Track listings ==
Two versions were released—a United States version and an international version.

=== US version ===
- Disc 1
1. "No Stopping for Nicotine" – 5:02
2. "Sacramento" – 5:04
3. "Flashdance" (featuring Anousheh Khalili) – 5:58
4. "Swallow Me" – 5:10
5. "Awake Enough" (featuring Anousheh Khalili) – 5:14
6. "Everybody's Wearing My Head" – 5:33
7. "Say Hello" (featuring Anousheh Khalili) – 4:35
8. "Dreams" (featuring Stevie Nicks) – 4:39
9. "Dub Shepherd" – 5:54
10. "Sexy III" – 6:23
11. "Sergio's Theme" – 5:05
12. "In Love with a Friend" – 3:51
13. "Flashing for Money" (Sultan Radio Edit) (vs. Dire Straits) – 3:56
- Disc 2
1. "Flashdance" (Guetta and Garraud F*** Me I'm Famous Remix) – 9:18
2. "Flashdance" (Hoxton Whores Remix) – 7:31
3. "Say Hello" (Rock Mix) – 7:02
4. "Say Hello" (Angello and Ingrosso Remix) – 8:48
5. "Say Hello" (Paul Van Dyk Remix) – 10:33
6. "Say Hello" (Dylan Rhymes Acid Thunder Mix) – 7:15
7. "Say Hello" and "Flashdance" videos (Enhanced CD content)

=== International version ===
1. "Floating"
2. "Sacramento"
3. "Flashdance" (featuring Anousheh Khalili)
4. "Swallow Me"
5. "Awake Enough" (featuring Anousheh Khalili)
6. "Everybody's Wearing My Head"
7. "Say Hello" (featuring Anousheh Khalili)
8. "Dreams" (featuring Stevie Nicks)
9. "Dub Shepherd"
10. "Sergio's Theme"
11. "In Love with a Friend"
12. "Sexy Ill"
13. "Bagels"
14. "No Stopping for Nicotine"

== Singles ==
- "Flashdance" (2004)
- "Say Hello" (2005)
- "Sacramento" (2006)
- "Dreams" (featuring Stevie Nicks) (2006)

== Charts ==
Chart (2005)	Peak position
Australian Albums (ARIA)	35
Dutch Albums (Album Top 100)	63
Irish Albums (IRMA)	44
UK Albums (OCC)	54
US Heatseekers Albums (Billboard)	28
US Independent Albums (Billboard)	36
US Top Dance Albums (Billboard)	3
