= Eugene Celebration =

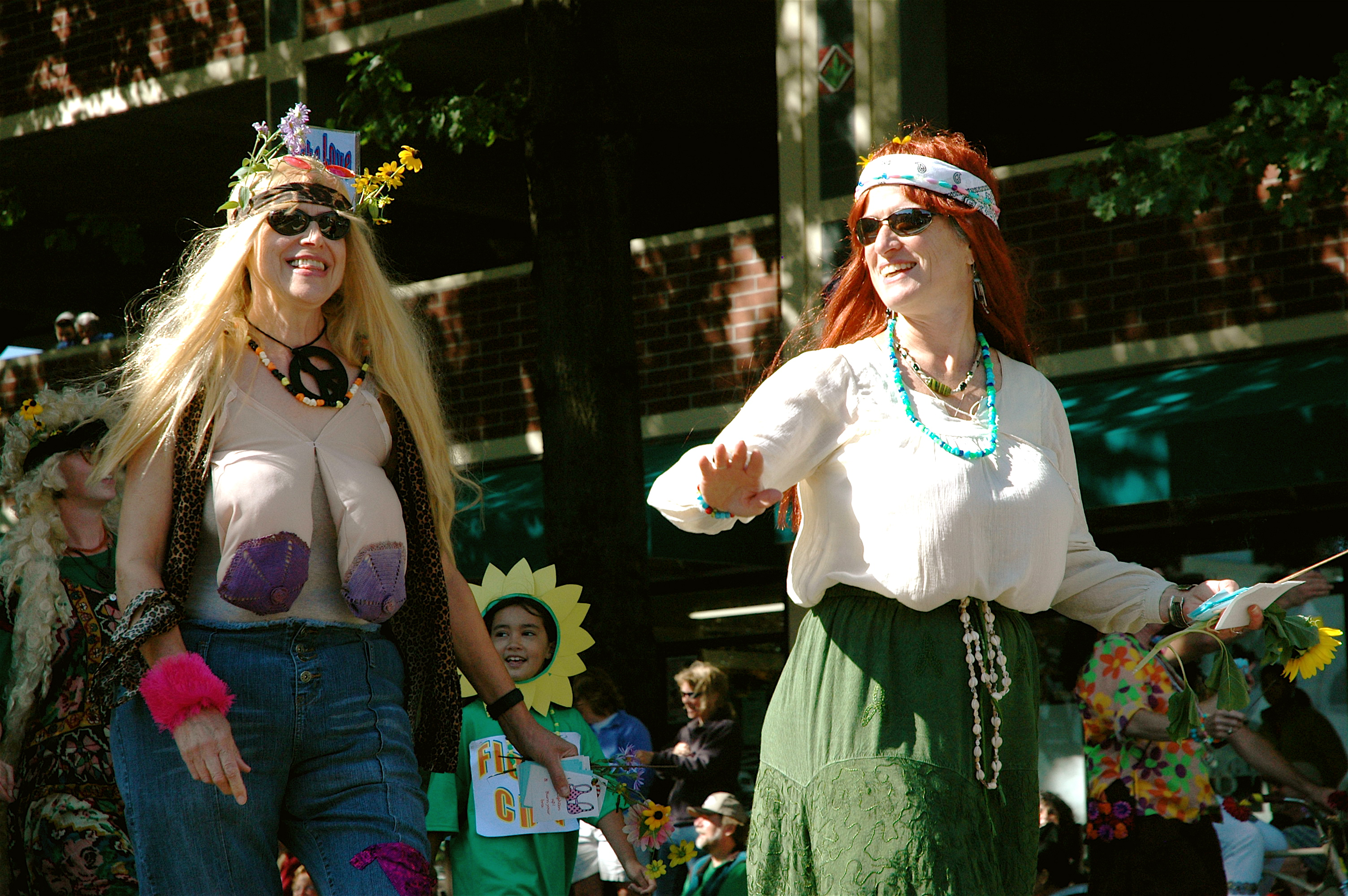
Attendees at the Eugene Celebration.

The Eugene Celebration was a 3-day annual community celebration and civic event that has been held at the end of summer since 1983 in downtown Eugene, Oregon, United States. The parade held on Saturday morning features the newly crowned Slug Queen. The event has not been held since 2015.

Featuring bands and performers from throughout the Pacific Northwest, the three-day festival has been held in early September.

== History ==
The Celebration was created in 1983 as a way to bring together members of the Eugene community for a weekend of music and festivities to celebrate the opening of the $22.5 million Hult Center for the Performing Arts. It attracted as many as 57,000 attendees in 2011. The event was originally sponsored by the city, and for a few years had corporate sponsorship of Centennial Bank. It was managed from 1999 through 2005 by Downtown Events Management, Inc. (DEMI), a Eugene-based non-profit corporation. Management was awarded to Kesey Enterprises, a for-profit company, for the 2013 celebration.

Eugene Celebration has brought attention to community issues and concerns regarding environmental responsibility within the greater context of a weekend festival. Recurring features at the celebration include the "Community Causeway" where nonprofit, charitable and advocacy organizations promote their services and, as of 2007, the "Sustainability Village" where Celebration participants can learn about sustainable lifestyle choices. A related event, the coronation of the SLUG Queen, occurs prior to the event.

In 2014, the event's management company, Kesey Enterprises, initially released a statement in June cancelling the August Celebration, citing new construction and growth in Eugene's revitalized downtown that reduced the space needed for entertainment and food venues. Kesey Enterprises later agreed to partner with the City of Eugene to host a $5 concert at the Cuthbert Amphitheater during the weekend. A free alternative "Festival of Eugene" at Skinner Butte Park was organized by Krysta Albert, who persisted despite a saga of funding and location uncertainties lasting as late as two weeks before the event. The Festival included "health and wellness vendors, nonprofit groups, food booths, live music and poetry readings." The Eugene Celebration Parade featured Lane Community College as the grand marshal, and included 70 groups of "school bands and dance troupes, the 2014 Slug Queen and his entourage, the fencers, roller derby skaters and belly dancers, and the primarily liberal politicians and political causes."

== Gallery ==
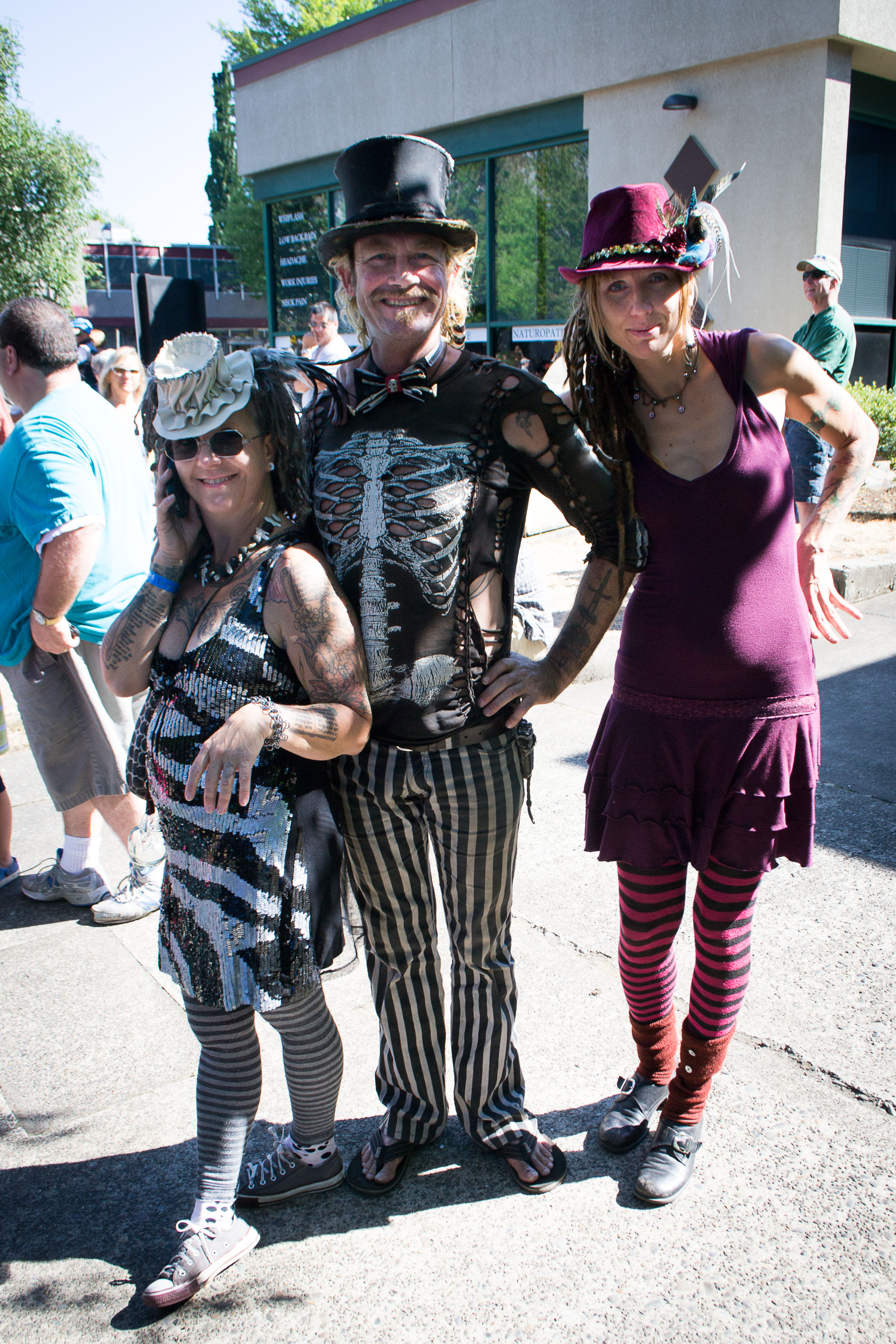

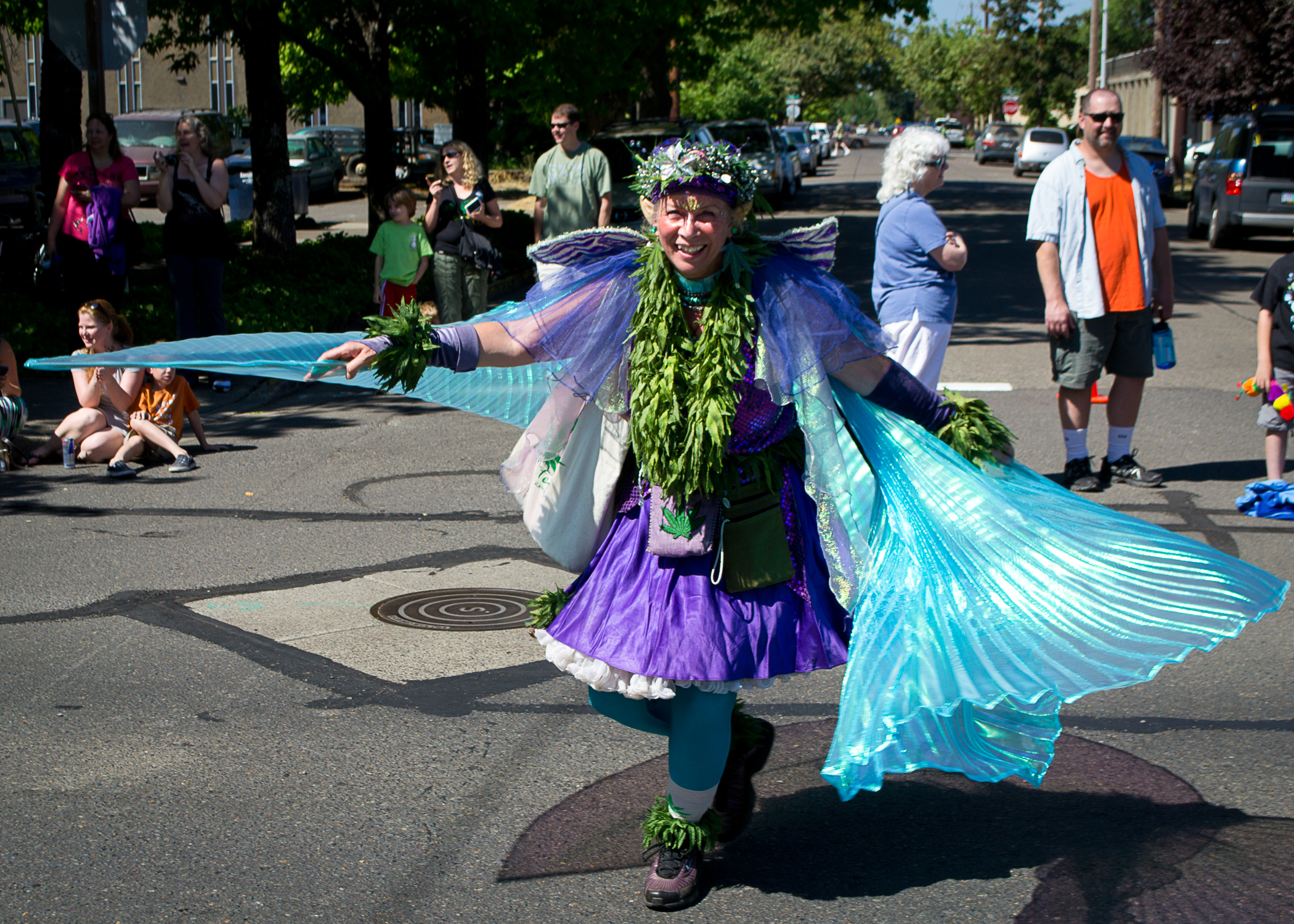

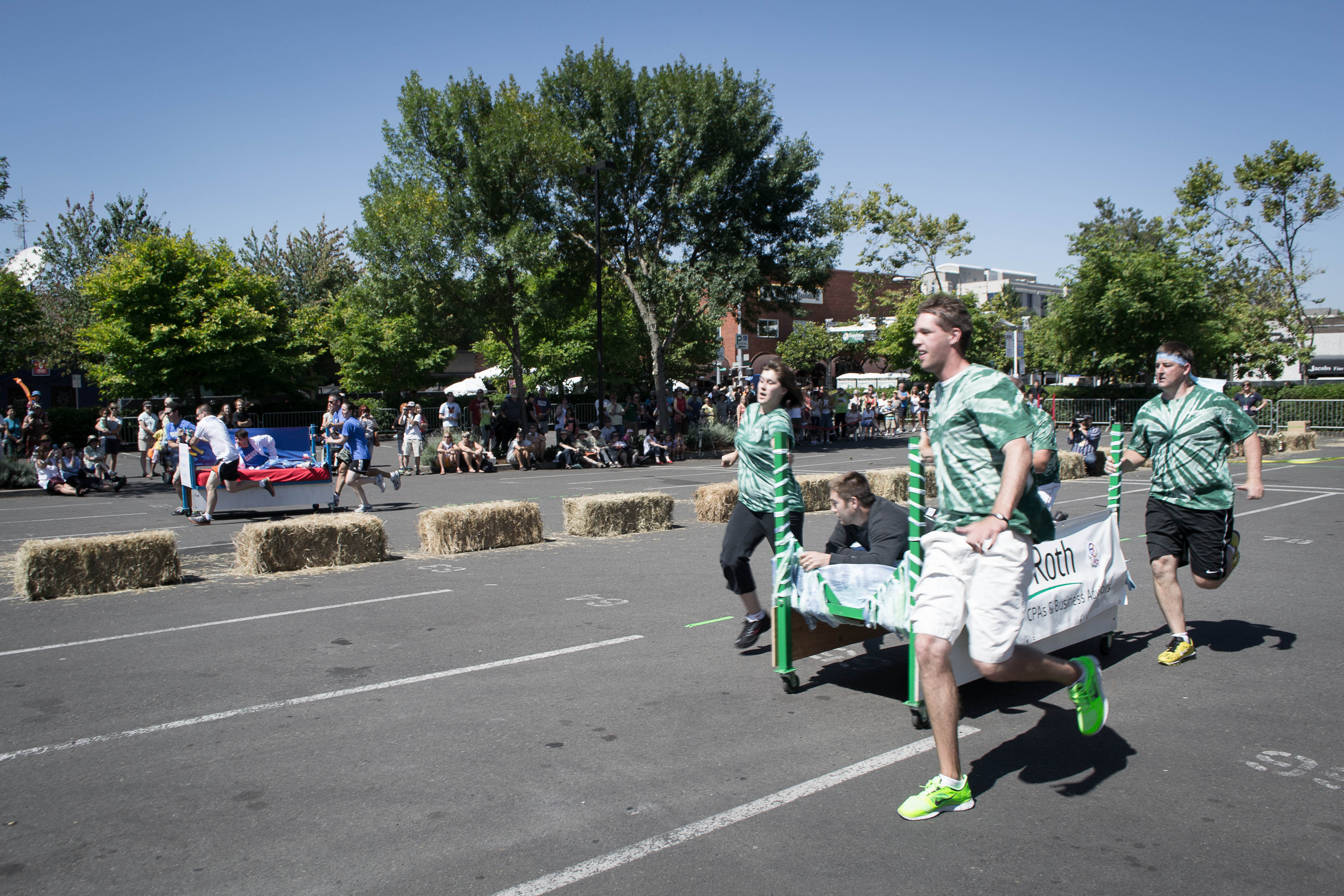

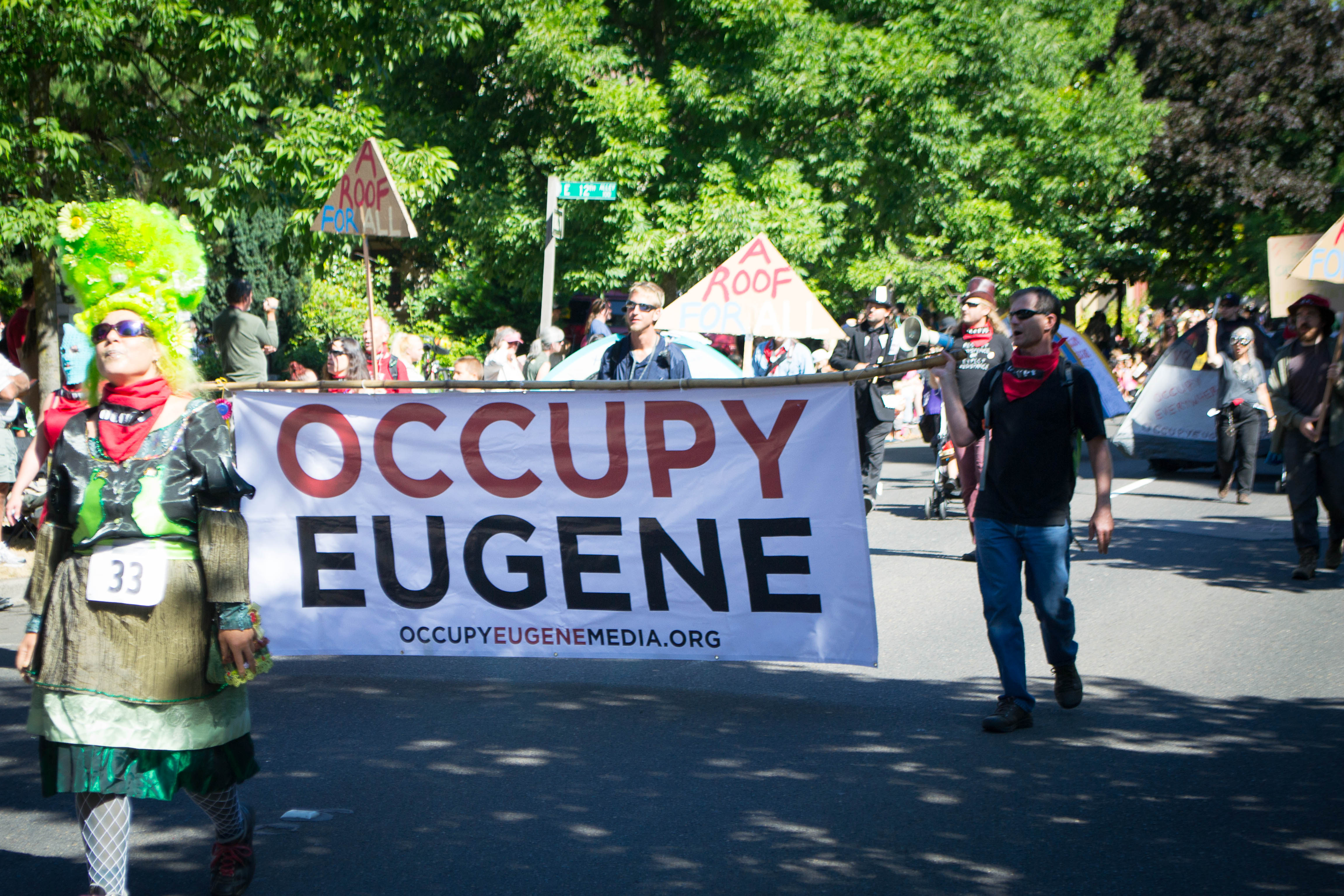

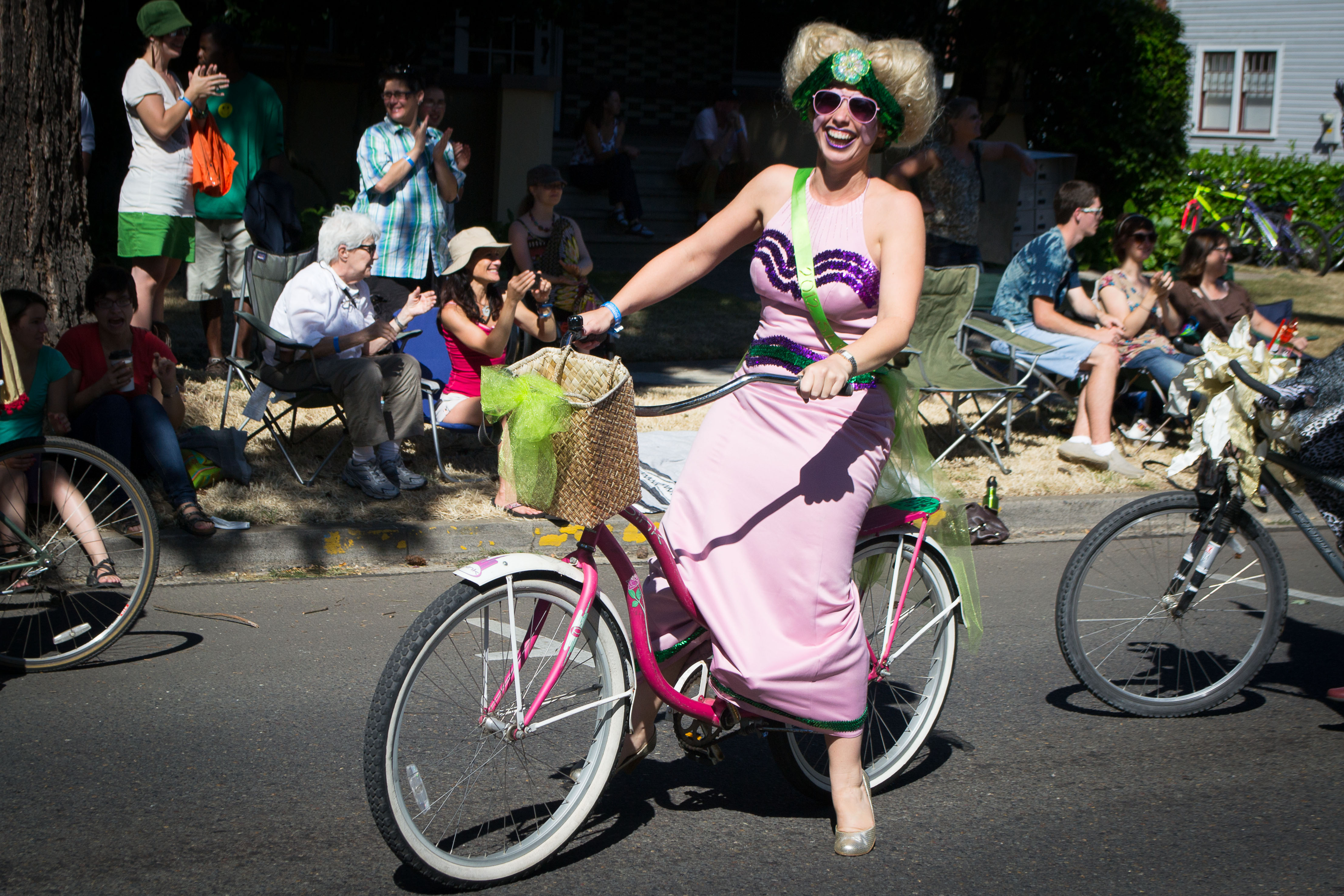

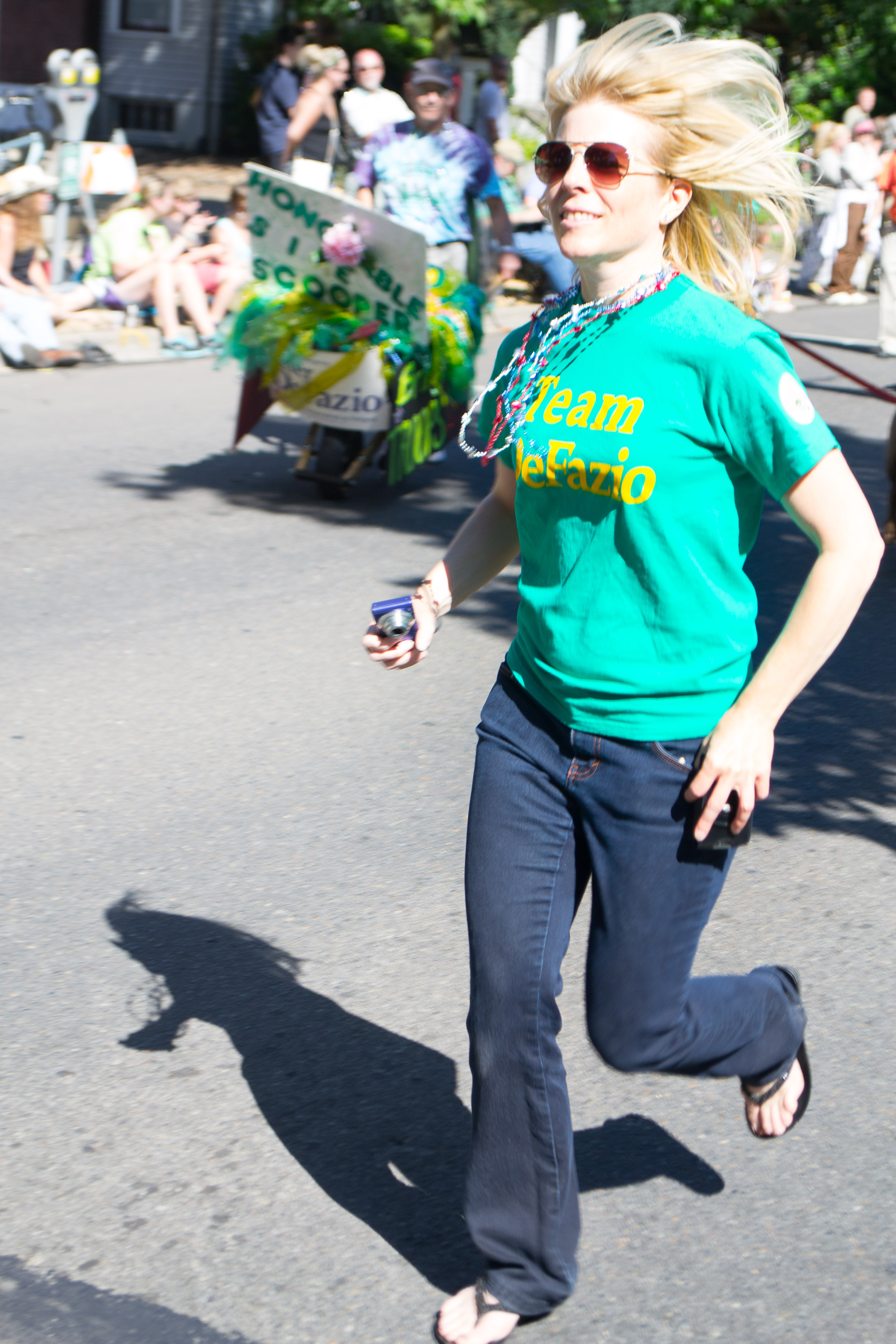

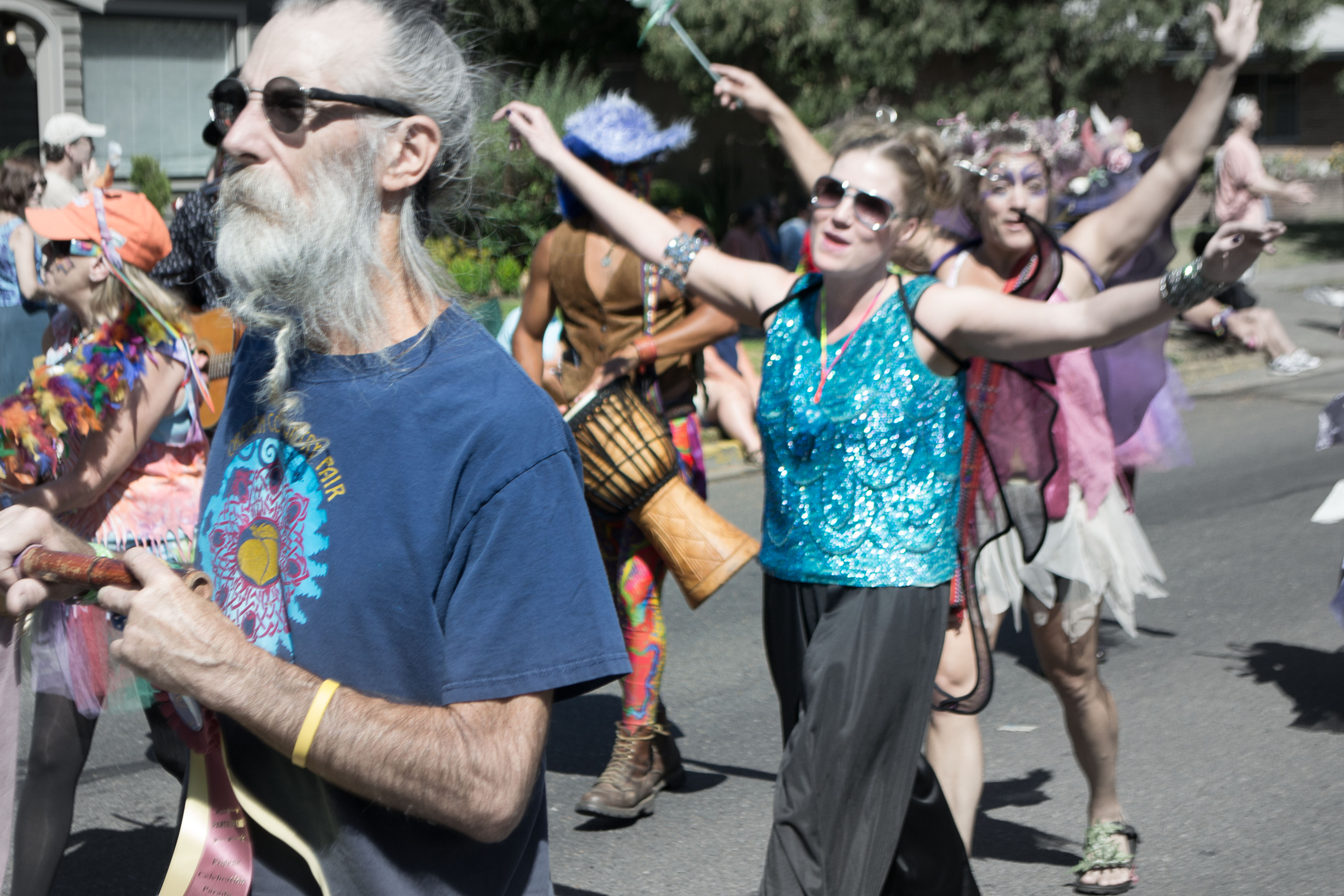
