= Homemade Knives =

American Indie folk band

- Origin: Richmond, Virginia, United States
- Genres: Indie folk,
- Years active: 2005–present
- Labels: Triple Stamp Records
- Members: Wil Loyal; Anousheh Khalili; Jonathan Vassar; Christopher Carroll; Ryan McLennan
- Past members: Shane Jenkins; Nathan Joyce
- Website: http://www.triplestamp.com

Homemade Knives is an American Indie folk band formed by Wil Loyal, Shane Jenkins, and Christopher Carroll. Their music features layered of acoustic guitars, cello, and lead vocals. Homemade Knives has played with bands such as Magnolia Electric Company, Catfish Haven, and DeYarmond Edison. Homemade Knives signed with Triple Stamp Records, co-owned in part by Loyal and Carroll, which closed in 2013.

== Members ==
Homemade Knives has five members:

- Wil Loyal – vocals, acoustic guitar
- Anousheh Khalili – piano
- Jonathan Vassar – accordion, harmonica, backing vocals
- Ryan McLennan – acoustic bass guitar
- Christopher Carroll – cello

Former members:

- Nathan Joyce – bass guitar
- Shane Jenkins – acoustic guitar

== Discography ==
=== Full length albums ===
- No One Doubts the Darkness – 2007 – Triple Stamp Records

=== EPs ===
- Industrial Parks – 2006 – Triple Stamp Records
