= Engineering Square (industrial park) =

Industrial park in Giza, Egypt

Engineering Square (e2)
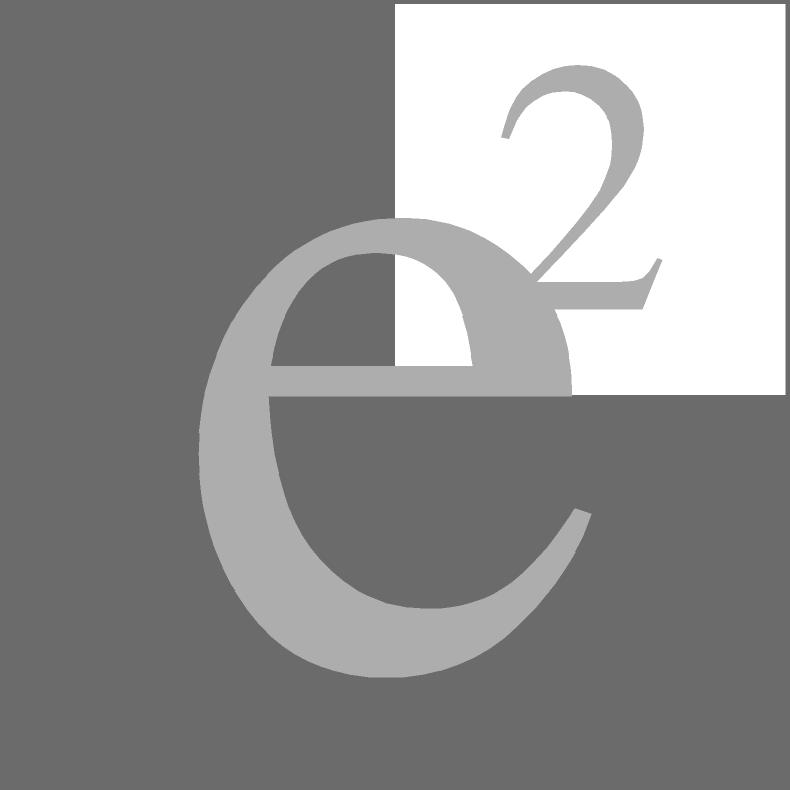
- Interactive map of Engineering Square (e2)
- Location: Giza, Egypt
- Coordinates: 29.945153°N 30.865859°E
- Opening date: February 2008; 18 years ago
- Developer: Industrial Development Group (IDG)
- Manager: Industrial Development Group (IDG)
- No. of tenants: 106
- Website: engineering-square.com at the Wayback Machine (archived January 2, 2019)

Engineering Square, or e2, is an Egyptian industrial park, owned and managed by Industrial Development Group (IDG). The park is designed and built on a total area of 3.1 million square meter, located in 6 October City, Giza, Egypt.

== History ==
The E2 Industrial Park was founded in February 2008 to accommodate prominent multinational and local companies in Egypt. An environmental impact assessment was carried out in 2011.

== Industry ==
Industries represented include Engineering, Auto spare parts, Garments, Foods, Cosmetics, and Plastic films.

As of 2019 there were 106 assigned factories with 40 operating and 27 under construction.

== Investors ==
The investors include:

- Aramex
- Bostik Egypt
- Chloride Egypt
- Döhler Egypt
- Egypt Foods Group
- Elif Global Packing
- Flex P Films Egypt
- Naffco
- Nuqal Group
- Pegas Nonwovens Egypt LLC
