= SLUG Queen =

Mascot character of Eugene, Oregon

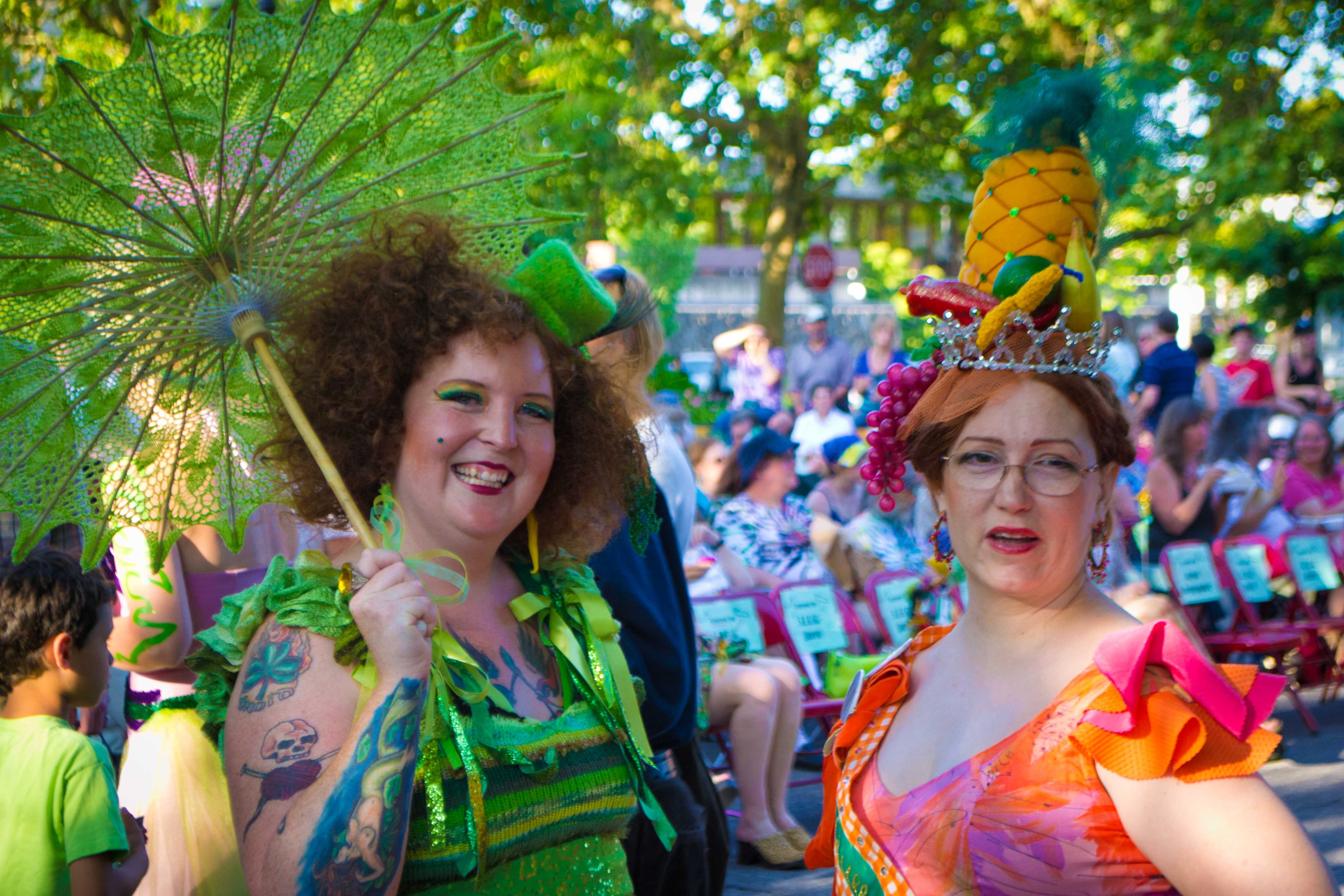
S.L.U.G. Queen Pageant 2012 Queen Sadie Slimy Stitches and Queen Carmen Slugana

The S.L.U.G. Queen (an acronym for the "Society for the Legitimization of the Ubiquitous Gastropod"), is a humorous character concept considered to be the unofficial goodwill ambassador of the City Of Eugene, Oregon, United States. The SLUG Queen presided over events in Eugene, including the now-defunct Eugene Celebration and EUG Parade. The S.L.U.G. Queen has never been the domain of the Eugene Celebration despite their origin connection. In fact, the S.L.U.G. Queen concept was born as a direct response in opposition to the conventional nature of the name "Eugene Celebration". A new S.L.U.G. Queen is crowned on the second Friday in August after a public competition. The queen is named "S.L.U.G." as a rebellious nod to the more common tradition of crowning agricultural queens, often selected for beauty, as opposed to wit and audacity. Slugs were selected to celebrate because they are ubiquitous in the Willamette Valley, they are antithetical to traditional or stereotypical mascots, and they symbolize creativity and unbridled good-natured humor. The newly crowned S.L.U.G. Queen is referred to as the "Raining" S.L.U.G. Queen. After a year of "rain", the S.L.U.G. Queen is promoted to Old Queen (never former or past).

== Coronation ==
The annual coronation process somewhat resembles a formal beauty pageant, but with a campy spin. The slug-themed pageant started in 1983, and Eugene celebrated the S.L.U.G. Queen coronation's 25th year with a Silver Jubilee in August 2007. The Silver Jubilee Queen was Old Queen Glorious Gastropause, also known as comedian Leigh Anne Jasheway. Slugs are gender neutral, therefore S.L.U.G. Queens may identify as any gender.

== History ==
The S.L.U.G. Queen was first conceived in 1983 as a backlash to the Eugene City Council choosing the characterless name "Eugene Celebration" for a citywide festival. After the successful opening of the Hult Center for the Performing Arts in 1982, the city council determined that an annual celebration of art, culture, and commerce in Eugene would be advantageous. Cynthia Wooten, a city councilwoman, was discussing the idea of a uniquely Eugene festival and parade with then-City Manager Mike Gleason. Gleason purportedly wanted to name the city festival simply the "Eugene Celebration" according to Wooten. Wooten, along with Karl Eysenbach and Paul Ollswang, argued for the name "Slugfest," but this was turned down by the rest of the city council.

Alana Probst organized the first Slugfest as an alternative to (and parody of) other cities' beauty pageants in her own backyard where the first S.L.U.G. Queen was elected. The rebel group then entered a parade float shaped like a giant slug in the first Eugene Celebration Parade, with the first S.L.U.G. Queen, a man named Bruce Gordon, riding in drag on it. This movement was in direct opposition to the wishes of the rest of the city council but was instantly popular with the crowds.

The S.L.U.G. Queen Competition and Coronation grew to be an annual event. Rather than perpetuating typical beauty queen standards, the originators chose as their emblem a life form more in keeping with the Pacific Northwest's soggy climate and Eugene's iconoclastic spirit: the humble slug. Since 1991, the S.L.U.G. Queen coronation has been organized by Kim Still, who was the manager of the Eugene Saturday Market.

== Selection criteria ==
The new S.L.U.G. Queen is selected annually on the second Friday evening in August in a three part competition that involves costume judging (based on campy appeal and overall sluggishness), a three-minute on-stage talent performance, and a single question designed to test the quick wit of each contestant. The S.L.U.G. Queen is chosen by a collection of past queens officially referred to as "old," not "former" queens, as one of their mottoes is "once a Queen--always a Queen." The judges base their assessments on three factors: originality, creativity, and a flamboyant outgoing personality.

One important aspect that sets the S.L.U.G. Queen pageant apart from others is that bribery is accepted and encouraged and the judging is done by a panel of Old Queens. The moment a new queen is crowned, the old queens are open to bribery. Creative bribes curry the most favor with the old queens. They annually remind budding hopefuls to "Bribe early and bribe often." Since S.L.U.G. Queens retain the title of queen for life, and the power to crown new queens, they remain a vibrant, visible and vocal part of the community in their royal character. They use this visibility to raise awareness and funds for local causes and charities and host events in character.

== SLUG Queen duties ==
The new S.L.U.G. Queen formerly presided over the parade at the Eugene Celebration, where the queen met the public for her first official duty. In the past she has opened the Mayor's Art Show, the New Zone Gallery's Salon des Refusés (a display of art that was not selected for the Mayor's Art Show), delivers a benediction at the Maude Kerns Art Center Jello Art Show, holds a charitable ball for the charity of her choice, and "rains" over the coronation for the following year's S.L.U.G. Queen. She may choose to make other appearances throughout the year including the Oregon Country Fair, ribbon cuttings and openings, fashion shows, and Art and the Vineyard, among others.

The S.L.U.G. Queens pride themselves on representing the diversity of the City of Eugene. Anyone over the age of 21 is electable, provided they are able to impress the Old Queens.

S.L.U.G. queens never lose their prestigious titles. After their "raining" year they are promoted to "Old Queen" for the next decade, then "Very Old Queen", "Very, Very Old Queen" and "Exquisitely Old Queen" at each subsequent decade.
