= Junk Science and the American Criminal Justice System =

Book written by M. Chris Fabricant

Junk Science and the American Criminal Justice System is a book written by M. Chris Fabricant.

== Background ==
The book was written by M. Chris Fabricant and pulished by Akashic Books on April 5, 2022. Fabricant works as the director of strategic litigation for the Innocence Project. Fabricant argues that in the 1960s and 1970s people began trying to apply science to forensic investigation in ways that often led to wrongful convictions. Fabricant defines junk science as "subjective speculation masquerading as scientific evidence.". The book discusses the history of forensic dentistry and other forensic practices that do not hold scientific weight. One of the problems with claiming to use science in forensics is that the judge and jury are scientifically illerate and unable to verify whether the scientific claims are sound or not.

The book covers the case of Steve Chaney who was convicted in 1987 based on forensic dentistry that was later contested by the Innocence Project. The book also covers the case of Keith Allen Harward. The book explores how prosecutors like Henry Wade used pseudo science to put innocent people in prison. The book contains a chapter dedicated to how innocent people have been executed in the United States because of the use of junk science as evidence.

The audiobook was narrated by Chris Henry Coffey. The book covers a broader set of topics, but is similar to The Cadaver King and the Country Dentist: A True Story of Injustice in the American South by Radley Balko and Tucker Carrington.

== Reception ==
The book received a starred review in Publishers Weekly with the praise that the book "will likely shake even advocates of robust law and order approaches." Sarah Datta writes in Pursuit Magazine that Fabricant's "expertise as an Innocence Project attorney shines through on every page".
