= Junk Science (album) =

Studio album by Deep Dish
- Released: June 1, 1998
- Genre: Electronic, progressive house
- Length: 78:02
- Label: Deconstruction

Deep Dish chronology
Junk Science (1998)	George Is On (2005)

Junk Science is the first studio album by electronic music duo Deep Dish. The album reached number 37 in the United Kingdom.

== Critical reception ==
Professional ratings
Review scores
Source	Rating
AllMusic	4/5 stars

The Independent wrote that Deep Dish "use live sax, keyboards and guitars, and pay painstaking attention to atmospherics, but the ideas always run out before the tunes do."

== Track listing ==
All tracks by Dubfire and Sharam, except where noted.

=== CD album ===
1. "Morning Wood" – 2:19
2. "The Future of the Future (Stay Gold)" featuring Tracey Thorn (Dubfire, Sharam, Ben Watt) – 9:28
3. "Summer's Over" – 7:16
4. "Mohammad Is Jesus..." (Dubfire, Morel, Sharam) – 4:47
5. "Stranded" – 7:10
6. "Junk Science" – 3:51
7. "Sushi" – 7:52
8. "My Only Sin" (Dubfire, Morel, Sharam) – 4:05
9. "Monsoon" – 6:52
10. "Persepolis" – 2:55
11. "Chocolate City (Love Songs)" – 10:28
12. "Mohammad Is Jesus..." (In Dub) – 5:16
13. "Wear the Hat" – 5:29

=== Vinyl album ===
1. "The Future of the Future (Stay Gold)" featuring Tracey Thorn (Dubfire, Sharam, Watt) – 13:20
2. "Summer's Over" – 8:41
3. "Wear the Hat" – 5:29
4. "Stranded" – 7:53
5. "Junk Science" – 5:58
6. "Sushi" – 7:50
7. "My Only Sin" (Dubfire, Morel, Sharam) – 4:04
8. "Morning Wood" – 2:19
9. "Chocolate City (Love Songs)" – 10:28
10. "Mohammad Is Jesus" (In Dub) – 5:14
11. "Mohammad Is Jesus" (Dubfire, Morel, Sharam) – 4:46
12. "Monsoon" – 6:52
13. "Persepolis" – 2:55

=== Vinyl 2×12" promo ===
1. "Mohammad Is Jesus" (Dubfire, Morel, Sharam) – 9:16
2. "Sushi" – 9:47
3. "The Future of the Future (Stay Gold)" (Dubfire, Sharam, Watt) – 13:20
4. "Chocolate City (Love Songs)" – 10:28

== Charts ==
Chart (1998)	Peak position
Norwegian Albums (VG-lista)	39
UK Albums (OCC)	37
