= Flashdance (song) =

2004 single by Deep Dish

Single by Deep Dish

from the album George Is On
- Released: July 4, 2004 (Spain)
- Length: 4:00
- Label: Deep Dish
- Songwriters: Shandi Sinnamon, Ronald Magness
- Producer: Deep Dish

Deep Dish singles chronology
"Stoned" (Deep Dish remix) (2004)	"Flashdance" (2004)	"Say Hello" (2005)

"Flashdance" is a song by American electronic music duo Deep Dish with vocals provided by Anousheh Khalili. It is a cover of "He's a Dream" by Shandi Sinnamon, from the Flashdance soundtrack. Released in 2004, the song received positive critical reviews and became a hit in several countries, including the United Kingdom, where it debuted and peaked at number three on the UK Singles Chart.

== Reception ==
=== Critical response ===
Ben Hogwood of musicOMH was favorable of the song, saying that "Flashdance" has given Deep Dish "a huge worldwide club hit, its full-bodied hook picked up by many a DJ". Hogwood named it the most commercial track on the album, which according to him "loosely follows the lead of its predecessor, teaming moody instrumentals with club based vocal tracks". The "Guetta & Garraud F*** Me I'm Famous" remix was nominated to the Grammy Award for Best Remixed Recording, Non-Classical.

=== Chart performance ===
For the chart issue dated October 9, 2004, "Flashdance" debuted at number three on the UK Singles Chart, becoming Deep Dish's first and only single to reach the UK top 10. It was the second-highest entry for that week, behind "I Hope You Dance" by Ronan Keating. "Flashdance" peaked at number 14 on the Australian Singles Chart and was certified gold by the Australian Recording Industry Association (ARIA), denoting shipments of 35,000 copies.

== Remix ==
In 2005 a mashup of "Flashdance" with the Dire Straits song "Money for Nothing" was included on the George Is On album. The remix, titled "Flashing For Money" and arranged by DJ Sultan, appeared as a B-side on Deep Dish Records single releases of "Say Hello", and was released as an A-side single on the Absolute Sound label in France.

== Track listings ==
US CD single and digital EP

1. "Flashdance" (radio edit) – 4:00
2. "Flashdance" (original club mix) – 11:10
3. "Flashdance" (Skylark remix) – 10:44
4. "Flashdance" (Raul Rincon remix) – 7:49
5. "Flashdance" (Guetta & Garraud F*** Me I'm Famous remix) – 9:17
6. "Flashdance" (Meat Katie remix) – 6:35
7. "Flashdance" (Meat Katie dub) – 6:19

UK 12-inch single 1

A1. "Flashdance" (Flashdance club) – 11:12
AA1. "Flashdance" (Meat Katie remix) – 6:33
AA2. "Flashdance" (Meat Katie dub) – 6:33

UK 12-inch single 2

A1. "Flashdance" (Skylark remix) – 10:42
AA1. "Flashdance" (Raul Rincon remix) – 7:46
AA2. "Flashdance" (Guetta & Garraud F*** Me I'm Famous remix) – 6:56

UK CD single

1. "Flashdance" (radio edit) – 3:13
2. "Flashdance" (original club mix—UK radio version) – 7:49
3. "Flashdance" (Skylark remix) – 6:56
4. "Flashdance" (Raul Rincon remix) – 7:46
5. "Flashdance" (Guetta & Garraud F*** Me I'm Famous remix) – 6:56
6. "Flashdance" (Meat Katie remix) – 6:33

Australian CD single

1. "Flashdance" (radio edit)
2. "Flashdance" (Guetta & Garraud F*** Me I'm Famous remix)
3. "Flashdance" (Skylark remix)
4. "Flashdance" (Meat Katie remix)
5. "Flashdance" (original club mix—UK radio version)

== Charts ==
=== Weekly charts ===
Chart (2004–2005)	Peak position
Australia (ARIA)	14
Australian Club Chart (ARIA)	1
Australian Dance (ARIA)	2
Austria (Ö3 Austria Top 40)	55
Belgium (Ultratop 50 Flanders)	25
Belgium (Ultratip Bubbling Under Wallonia)	3
Europe (Eurochart Hot 100)	10
France (SNEP)	33
Germany (GfK)	63
Greece (IFPI)	7
Hungary (Rádiós Top 40)	24
Hungary (Dance Top 40)	1
Hungary (Single Top 40)	9
Ireland (IRMA)	14
Ireland Dance (IRMA)	1
Italy (FIMI)	49
Netherlands (Dutch Top 40)	5
Netherlands (Single Top 100)	10
Romania (Romanian Top 100)	20
Scotland Singles (Official Charts)	3
Spain (Promusicae)	6
Switzerland (Schweizer Hitparade)	89
UK Singles (Official Charts)	3
UK Dance (Official Charts)	1
US Dance Club Songs (Billboard)	36
US Dance Singles Sales (Billboard)	8

=== Year-end charts ===
Chart (2004)	Position
Australian Club Chart (ARIA)	2
Australian Dance (ARIA)	16
UK Singles (OCC)	67

Chart (2005)	Position
Australia (ARIA)	82
Australian Dance (ARIA)	9
Hungary (Rádiós Top 40)	92
Netherlands (Dutch Top 40)	84
Netherlands (Single Top 100)	98

== Certifications ==
Region	Certification	Certified units/sales
Australia (ARIA)	Gold	35,000^{^}
^{^} Shipments figures based on certification alone.

== Release history ==
Region	Date	Format(s)	Label(s)	Ref.
Italy	2004	12-inch vinyl; CD	Rise	
Spain	July 4, 2004	CD	Vendetta	
United Kingdom	September 27, 2004	12-inch vinyl; CD	Positiva	
Australia	November 15, 2004	CD	Epic	
