= Hunter Siegel =

Canadian disc jockey and music producer

- Born: Samuel Hunter Siegel Toronto, Ontario, Canada
- Genre: Dance Music
- Occupations: Music Producer, DJ
- Years active: 2013–present
- Labels: Thrive; Size; BigBeat; Spinnin' Records / FlyEye; Deadbeats
- Website: www.noneon.com

Hunter Siegel is a Canadian DJ and music producer. Hunter made his first appearance with his debut single, released independently, Waiting Up, which was released in white label format in June 2013. Hunter received international support with Waiting Up and quickly caught the ear of a number of tastemaker labels, like Steve Angello's Size Records where he did a release with house music legend Todd Terry. In 2015, Hunter released his first record with Atlantic's dance label Big Beat Records, titled Let Me Love You Right, which featured Canadian vocalist Kai. The record received immediate support on radio throughout North America. Hunter and BigBeat then followed up with the music video which was an ode to the wildly popular movie "Fight Club" as noted in the Billboard Magazine world premiere. Since 2015, Hunter has appeared in numerous international music festivals like HARD SUMMER MUSIC FEST Electric Zoo Music Festival in New York City, Splash House in Palm Springs, California, Holy Ship and many more. In 2016, Hunter and collaborator Autoerotique release their hit single "On the Floor" (stylized O.T.F.) which took the dance scene by storm garnering support from every DJ imaginable from Skrillex to Hardwell and leading the year as one of the most played songs in Festival DJ sets. In addition, over the course of his career, Hunter has collaborated with artists like Zeds Dead, Shaun Frank, Omar Linx, Adventure Club, Matroda and Wax Motif, continuing to be at the forefront of underground dance music. Hunter Siegel is also the creator of the international brand #NoNeon which launched in January 2015 out of Toronto (at the legendary "Hoxton" nightclub) and has since spread south to Florida for multiple Miami Music Week showcases.

His single "Shadows in the Dark", a collaboration with Elliot Moss, won the Juno Award for Underground Dance Single of the Year at the Juno Awards of 2022.
