= Yoshitoshi Recordings =

Dance music record label

Yoshitoshi Recordings is a dance music record label which is owned and operated by house producer Sharam. It was founded in 1994. While pigeonholed as a progressive label, its releases in fact cover a broad spectrum of modern dance music, reflecting the eclectic tastes of its owners. The first release on the label was Submarine's self-titled single.

Deep Dish developed offshoot dance labels Deep Dish, Shinichi and Yo as well, each catering to a slightly different genre of house music. In addition, they owned and operated a retail store (also named Yoshitoshi) in the Georgetown area of D.C. The store sold an extensive selection of dance records of all genres including drum n bass and breakbeat, as well as clothing, mixtapes and record bags. The store closed in 2003, although their labels continue to release music, mostly in digital format with occasional CDs and vinyl projects.

== Notable Album Releases ==
- Deep Dish's Yoshiesque, Volumes 1 and 2
- Morel's Queen Of the Highway and Lucky Strike
- In House We Trust, Volumes 1 through 4
- Yoshitoshi Ibiza: Mixed by Sharam

== Notable 12 Inch Single Releases ==
- Luzon "Baguio Track"
- 2 Phat Cunts "Ride"
- Chiapet "Tick Tock"
- Eddie Amador "Rise"
- Mysterious People "Fly Away"
- PQM "You Are Sleeping"
- Rob Salmon & Rob Rives "Body Talk"
- Narcotic Thrust "Safe From Harm" (the first release from the label to hit #1 on the Hot Dance Music/Club Play chart)
- Brother Brown "Under The Water"

== See also ==
- List of record labels
- List of electronic music record labels
