= Undisputed championship =

Undisputed championship may refer to:

- Undisputed championship (boxing)
- Undisputed championship (professional wrestling)
