= Dubfire =

Iranian-American DJ (born 1971)

Ali "Dubfire" Shirazinia
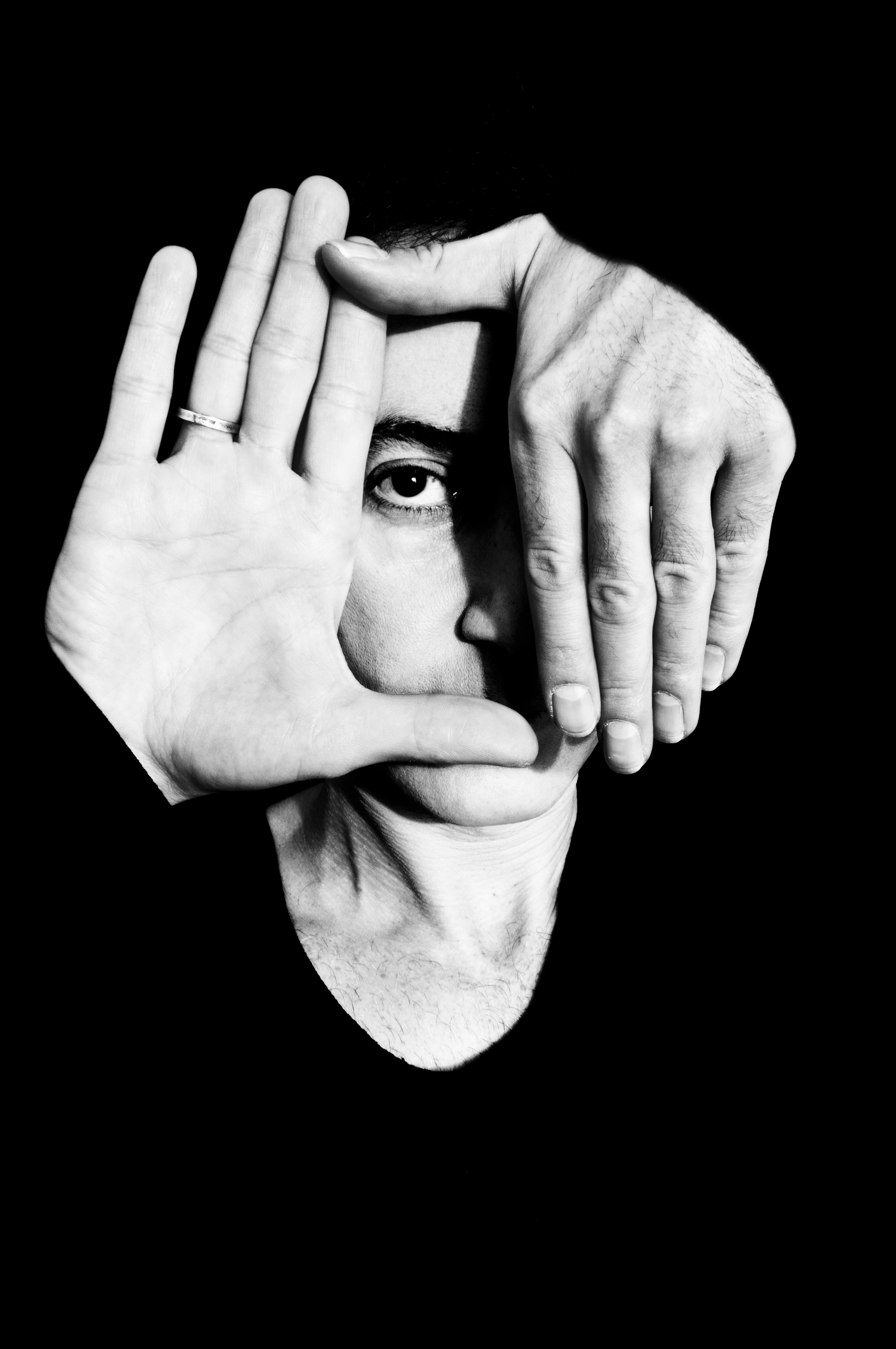

Background information
- Also known as: Dubfire
- Born: Ali Shirazinia; April 19, 1971 (age 55)
- Origin: Mashhad, Iran
- Genres: Techno, tech house, minimal
- Years active: 1991–present
- Labels: Sci+Tec Digital Audio; Deep Dish Records
- Member of: Deep Dish
- Website: www.dubfire.com

Ali Shirazinia (Persian: علی شیرازی‌نیا), commonly known by his stage name Dubfire, is an Iranian American house and techno DJ and producer. Prior to his solo career, Dubfire made up half of the duo Deep Dish. Dubfire's style is noticeably different from that of Deep Dish, consisting of techno rather than progressive house.

== Biography ==
Dubfire was born in Iran and moved to the United States at the age of seven with his father, mother and brother for his father to attend an American university. Growing up in the Washington, D.C., area, Dubfire spent much of his youth playing the guitar in school bands and listening to heavy doses of classic hip hop, jazz/rare groove, dub, new wave and industrial and was also influenced by the local punk scene and the music of Washington DC–based bands including Fugazi and Minor Threat. He frequented a local record store called Yesterday And Today Records, where he became acquainted with the sounds of artists like Kraftwerk, Ministry, Jesus & Mary Chain, Depeche Mode, Nitzer Ebb, Adrian Sherwood of On-U Sound and Einstürzende Neubauten.

In 1991, Shirazinia and fellow DC resident Sharam Tayebi formed Deep Dish, a DJ and production duo that became notable for their productions and DJ sets. Deep Dish released acclaimed dance classics beginning with the 1995 remix of De'Lacy's "Hideaway", and went on to work with an eclectic array of names in pop, rock and electronica. Sharam and Dubfire established Deep Dish Records, and they went on to win a Grammy in 2002 for their remix of Dido's "Thank You" along with many other high-profile awards. Following their successes as Deep Dish, both Sharam and Dubfire began to produce and DJ individually claiming "[they] got bored doing the same thing. [They've] always been separate producers and separate DJs who have just collaborated together for all these years."

Shirazinia used his long-time stage name "Dubfire" for his solo productions. His solo sound differs noticeably from that of Deep Dish, consisting of minimal, techno, and house rather than the predominantly progressive house sound of Deep Dish. His production I Feel Speed, which is a cover of an obscure Love & Rockets song, features his own vocals. Dubfire also sings in In Love With a Friend on Deep Dish's debut album. I Feel Speed has appeared in the advertisement of the Volkswagen Eos.

In 2007, Dubfire announced the launch of his new record label, Science + Technology Digital Audio, also known simply as SCI + TEC. He set the label up as an outlet to release his new music and began quietly unleashing a string of remarkable tracks. In 2007, he released electro-tech track "Roadkill," while the stripped-back 'RibCage' became the first ever release on Loco Dice's Desolat label.

Dubfire followed up with a number of releases on some of electronic music's big labels. Richie Hawtin, who signed Dubfire's "Emissions" to his Minus label, also released Dubfire's rework of 'Spastik' (the track that Hawtin produced in 1993 under his Plastikman alias) as an official re-work. Soon thereafter, Sven Vath's Cocoon Records took notice and released some of Dubfire's music as well.

He continued to release more productions. He had two top 10 tracks in Resident Advisor's 100 Most Charted Records of 2007, International DJ Magazine's Player of the Year in 2008, nominations for Beatport's "Best Minimal Artist" and "Best Techno Artist" in 2008 and 2009, and mixes for Mixmag, BBC Radio 1's Essential Mix and DJ Magazine.

In 2008, Dubfire produced a remix of Radio Slave's "Grindhouse" featuring Danton Eeprom.DJ Magazine called it "jet-black, polished chrome techno".

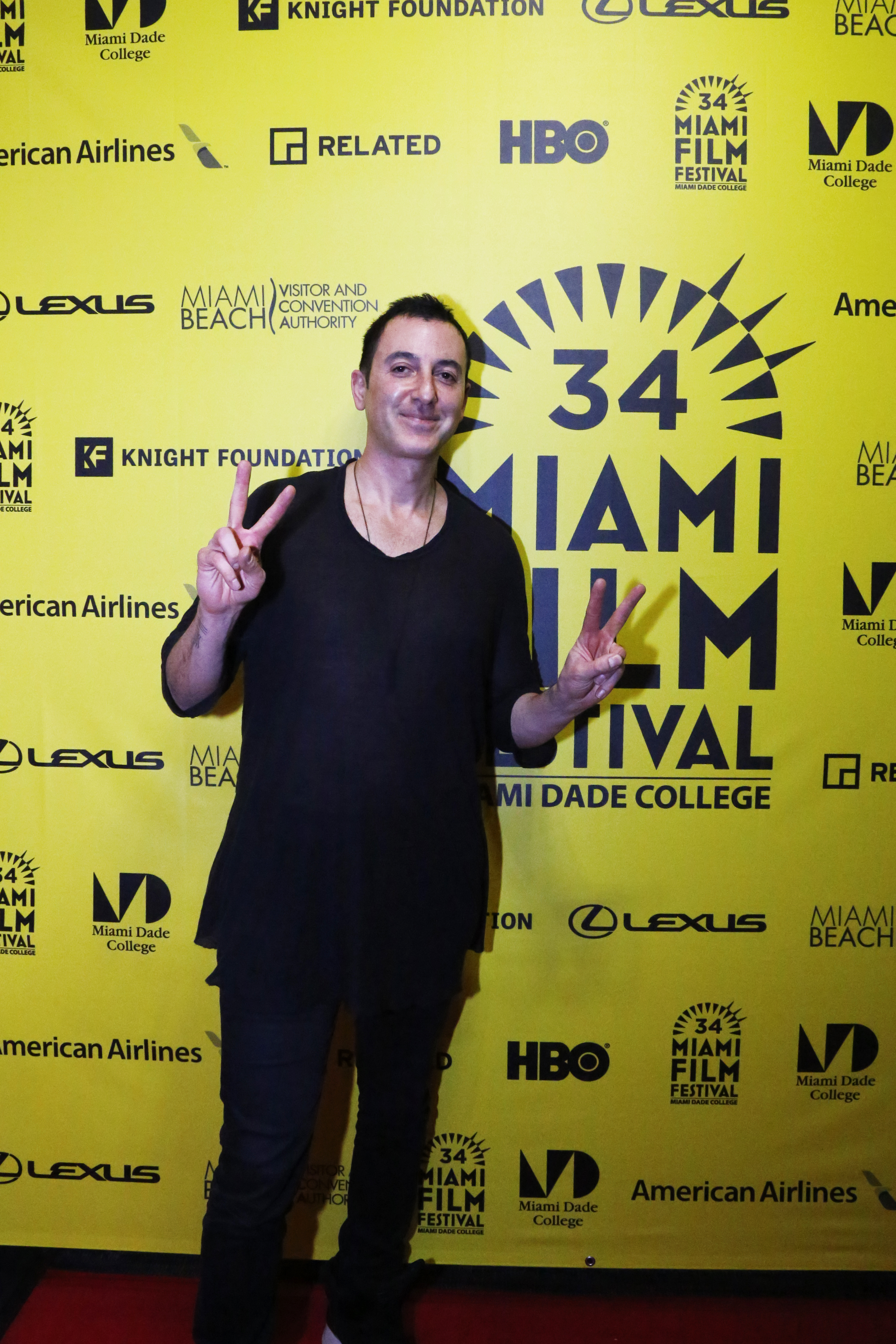
Dubfire at the 2017 Miami International Film Festival

Dubfire's more recent work has seen him co-produce tracks with British electronic music act Underworld, release a two-disc compilation with Loco Dice for Cocoon, additional remixes of Plastikman material, and a collaborative project with producer Oliver Huntemann.

== Discography ==
=== Singles/EPs ===
- 2007 Emissions - #6 Resident Advisor Top 100 all-time charted tracks
- 2007 RibCage - #1 Resident Advisor Top 100 all-time charted tracks
- 2007 Roadkill
- 2007 I Feel Speed
- 2008 Diablo (With Oliver Huntemann)
- 2008 Dios (With Oliver Huntemann)
- 2009 Rabid
- 2009 Fuego (With Oliver Huntemann)
- 2010 Rejekt (Cocoon J)
- 2012: Slowburn
- 2012: Octvs
- 2012: Debris
- 2014: Exit (featuring Miss Kittin)
- 2014: Agua (With Oliver Huntemann ft. Xenia Beliayeva)
- 2022: Algorithm
- 2022: Rampat

=== Compilations ===
- 2003: GU025 Global Underground: Toronto - Afterclub Mix - #1 Top Electronic Albums, #20 Independent Albums, #29 Top Heatseekers
- 2007: GU31 Global Underground: Taipei - #16 Top Electronic Albums
- 2009: SCI+TEC: Past / Present / Future
- 2009: Dubfire's Digital Dreams
- 2009: Ten Years Cocoon Ibiza
- 2013: Transmission

=== Remixes ===
- 1993: Angela Marni – Slippin' & Slidin'
- 1994: Watergate – Lonely Winter
- 2006: Nitzer Ebb – Control I'm Here
- 2006: Robbie Rivera – Away
- 2007: Axwell Feat. Max'C – I Found U
- 2007: Meat Katie & D. Ramirez – Stop The Revolution - #99 Resident Advisor Top 100 all-time charted tracks
- 2007: DJ Yellow – More Enemy
- 2007: Plastikman – Spastik - #26 Resident Advisor Top 100 all-time charted tracks
- 2007: Nic Fanciulli – Lucky Heather
- 2007: Christian Smith & John Selway – Time
- 2008: System 7 – Spacebird - #7 Resident Advisor Top 100 all-time charted tracks
- 2008: UNKLE – Hold My Hand
- 2008: Radio Slave – Grindhouse
- 2008: Booka Shade – Charlotte
- 2008: Gregor Tresher – A Thousand Nights
- 2008: Minilogue – Jamaica
- 2008: Paul Ritch – Split the Line
- 2011: Paperclip People – 4 My Peepz
- 2011: Davide Squillace, Guti – That Ginger Ponytail
- 2011: Plastikman - Plasticity
- 2015: Plastikman – Exposed
- 2015: Hot Since 82 & Habischmann – Leave Me
- 2015: Barem - A
- 2016: Joseph Capriati – Fratello
- 2026: PETRU KSS - Trappist

== Awards and nominations ==
- Won for Best Minimal Artist – Beatport Music Awards
- Won for Best Techno Artist – Beatport Music Awards
- Nominated for Best Single of 2007 – Emissions – Beatport Music Awards
