= Anousheh Khalili =

American singer-songwriter (born 1983)

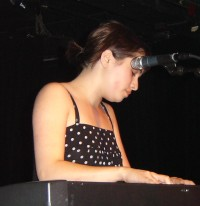
- Performing in 2009

Background information
- Born: Anousheh Khalili; 1982 (age 43–44); Seattle, Washington
- Genres: Electronica, trip hop, house, indie pop
- Instruments: Vocals, piano
- Website: http://anousheh.com/

Anousheh Khalili (born 1983) is an American singer-songwriter. She is known for providing vocals and also appearing in the videos for Deep Dish's "Flashdance" and "Say Hello", the latter of which was nominated for a Grammy Award in 2006 in the Best Dance Recording category, and Sharam's "Fun".

She recorded her debut album on the indie label Triple Stamp Records. Her piano and vocal skills have been compared to Fiona Apple and Neko Case.

== Albums ==
- Let the Ground Know Who's Standing on Him (January 2005) – 34:53
- The Trouble I Find (October 2012) – 23:45
- Make Noise (February 2015) – 39:29
