= Deep Dish (duo) =

American electronic music duo

- Origin: Washington, D.C., United States
- Genres: Progressive house, deep house, tech house, trip hop
- Years active: 1992–2006, 2014–present
- Labels: Yoshitoshi Records deConstruction/Arista/BMG Records; Positiva/EMI Records
- Members: Dubfire; Sharam
- Website: deepdish.com

Deep Dish are an American electronic music duo, consisting of Iranian-American artists Ali "Dubfire" Shirazinia and Sharam Tayebi.

== Biography ==
Based in Washington, D.C., they are well known for providing house or dance remixes of tracks of famous artists such as Madonna, Janet Jackson, Cher, Stevie Nicks and Gabrielle, and for its live DJ sets. Their collaborations and remixing abilities first came to attention with their seminal 1995 remix of De'Lacy's "Hideaway". Deep Dish's album Junk Science was released in 1998. The duo won a Best Remixed Recording Grammy for their remix of Dido's "Thank You". They were also nominated for a Grammy Award for Best Dance/Electronic Recording in 2006 for their song "Say Hello". In 2006, the DJs disbanded and moved to solo careers. They regrouped in 2014, releasing a new single "Quincy".

In August 2009, Sharam was featured on the Essential Mix and his mix was subsequently voted the best of 2009.

(2014, 2024–present) Deep Dish briefly reunited in 2014 to release the single "Quincy" and perform at the Ultra Music Festival. On March 22, 2014, Deep Dish reunited for their first Essential Mix since 2008.. However, it wasn't until 2024 that the duo announced a permanent return to the studio and the touring circuit with their "The Future" tour.

In 2025, they released "Midnight," their first original single in over a decade, featuring Eynka and Wrabel. This release was accompanied by a string of sold-out residencies at venues such as The Cause and fabric in London.

They continue to tour as a duo in 2026.

== Discography ==
=== Albums ===
- 1998 Junk Science
- 2005 George Is On

=== Singles/EPs ===
- 1994 "Chocolate City (Love Songs)"
- 1994 "High Frequency" (Pres. Quench)
- 1994 "The Dream" (Pres. Prana)
- 1995 "Sexy Dance" (Pres. Quench DC)
- 1995 "Come Back" (Pres. DC Deepressed)
- 1995 "Wear The Hat"
- 1996 "Stay Gold"
- 1997 "Stranded"
- 1998 "Stranded (In Dub)"
- 1998 "The Future of the Future (Stay Gold)" (with Everything but the Girl)
- 1999 "Mohammad Is Jesus…"
- 1999 "Summer's Over"
- 2003 "Global Underground: Toronto" [12" Single]
- 2004 "Flashdance"
- 2005 "Say Hello"
- 2006 "Sacramento"
- 2006 "Dreams" (with Stevie Nicks)
- 2006 "Be the Change", a musical work dedicated to Anousheh Ansari's space flight as she became the world's first female private space traveler
- 2014 "Quincy" (Virgin)
- 2025 "Midnight" (Armada)

=== DJ mixes ===
- 1995 Penetrate Deeper
- 1995 Undisputed
- 1996 In House We Trust Vol. 1
- 1996 DJ's Take Control, Vol. 3
- 1997 Cream Separates
- 1998 One Nation Under House Session 1
- 1998 One Nation Under House Session 2
- 1999 Yoshiesque
- 2000 Renaissance Ibiza
- 2001 Global Underground: Moscow
- 2001 Yoshiesque, Vol. 2
- 2003 Global Underground: Toronto
- 2006 Global Underground: Dubai (by Sharam)
- 2007 Global Underground: Taipei (by Dubfire)
- 2026 Global Underground: Dublin

=== Productions ===
- 1992 Hex - Tricky Jazz
- 1996 Alcatraz - Give Me Luv
- 2002 Timo Maas - Help Me
- 2003 Various Artists - Slip 'N' Slide Ibiza 2

=== Co-productions ===
- 1996 The Unknown Factor - The Basic Factor Album

=== Remixes ===
- 1993 Scottie Deep featuring Toni Williams - Soul Searchin'
- 1993 Naomi Daniel - Feel The Fire
- 1993 Angela Marni - Slippin' & Slidin'
- 1993 BT - Relativity
- 1994 Elastic Reality - Cassa De X
- 1994 Prana - The Dream
- 1994 Joi Cardwell - Trouble
- 1994 Gena Bess - How Hard I Search
- 1994 BT - The Moment Of Truth
- 1994 Scott Taylor - Don't Turn Your Back On Me
- 1995 Janet Jackson - When I Think Of You
- 1995 The Shamen - Transamazonia
- 1995 Quench - Sexy Dance
- 1995 Ashley Beedle - Revolutions In Dub
- 1995 De'Lacy - Hideaway
- 1995 Dajae - Day By Day
- 1995 Paula Abdul - Crazy Cool
- 1995 e-N - The Horn Ride
- 1995 Gusto - Disco's Revenge
- 1995 Swing 52 - Color Of My Skin
- 1996 Everything but the Girl - Wrong
- 1996 The Beloved - Three Steps To Heaven
- 1996 Global Communication - The Deep
- 1996 Aquarythm - Ether's Whisper
- 1996 Pet Shop Boys - Se A Vida É (That's The Way Life Is)
- 1996 Lisa Moorish - Mr. Friday Night
- 1996 Sandy B - Make The World Go Round
- 1996 All-Star Madness - Magic
- 1996 De'Lacy - That Look
- 1996 Victor Romeo - Love Will Find a Way
- 1996 Dangerous Minds - Live In Unity
- 1996 Dished-Out Bums - Lost In Space
- 1996 Kristine W - Land Of The Living
- 1996 Tina Turner - In Your Wildest Dreams
- 1996 Alcatraz - Giv Me Luv
- 1996 BT featuring Tori Amos - Blue Skies
- 1997 D-Note - Waiting Hopefully
- 1997 Adam F - Music In My Mind
- 1997 Sandy B - Ain't No Need To Hide
- 1997 Olive - Miracle
- 1997 Michael Jackson - Is It Scary
- 1998 Love and Rockets - Resurrection Hex
- 1998 Danny Tenaglia featuring Celeda - Music Is the Answer
- 1998 Eddie Amador - House Music
- 1998 DJ Rap - Good To Be Alive
- 1998 16B - Falling
- 1998 The Rolling Stones - Saint Of Me
- 1999 Brother Brown Featuring Frank'ee - Under The Water
- 1999 Eddie Amador - Rise
- 1999 Billie Ray Martin - Honey
- 1999 Slipknot - (Sic)
- 1999 J.D. Braithwaite - Give Me the Night
- 1999 Beth Orton - Central Reservation
- 2000 Amber - Sexual (Li Da De)
- 2000 Madonna - Music
- 2000 Gabrielle - Rise
- 2000 Morel - True (The Faggot Is You)
- 2000 Sven Vath - Barbarella
- 2000 Dusted - Always Remember To Respect and Honour Your Mother - Part One
- 2001 Dido - Thank You
- 2001 iiO - Rapture
- 2001 *NSYNC - Pop
- 2001 Planet Funk - Inside All the People
- 2001 Madonna - Impressive Instant
- 2001 Delerium - Innocente
- 2001 Depeche Mode - Freelove
- 2002 Justin Timberlake - Like I Love You
- 2002 Timo Maas featuring Kelis - Help Me
- 2002 Beenie Man featuring Janet - Feel It Boy
- 2002 Elisa - Come Speak To Me
- 2003 Dido - Stoned
- 2003 Madonna - Bedtime Story
- 2003 Whatever, Girl - Activator
- 2003 P. Diddy - Let's Get Ill
- 2004 Louie Vega & Jay 'Sinister' Sealée Feat. Julie McKnight - Diamond Life
- 2005 David Guetta - The World Is Mine
- 2005 Paul van Dyk - The Other Side
- 2006 Robbie Rivera - Float Away
- 2006 Coldplay - Clocks

== Chart positions ==
Year	Singles	Chart positions											
Year	Singles	US Club Play	CHE	NL	UK	BEL	FIN	IRE	GER	ITA	AUS	FRA	AUT
1996	"Stay Gold"	-	-	-	41	-	-	-	-	-	-	-	-
1997	"Stranded"	-	-	-	60	-	-	-	-	-	-	-	-
1998	"The Future of the Future (Stay Gold)" (with Everything but the Girl)	1	-	-	31	-	-	-	-	-	-	-	-
2003	"Like I Love You (Deep Dish Zig Zag Remix)" (with Justin Timberlake)	-	-	-	-	-	-	-	-	-	-	-	-
2004	"Stoned (Deep Dish Remix)" (with Dido)	1	-	-	-	-	-	-	-	-	-	-	-
2004	"Flashdance" (with Anousheh Khalili)	36	89	10	3	25	-	14	63	49	14	33	55
2005	"Say Hello"	1	90	44	14	56	4	18	72	-	40	-	-
2005	"Sacramento"	-	-	53	-	-	9	45	-	43	-	-	-
2005	"Flashing for Money" (with Dire Straits)	-	-	-	-	-	-	-	-	-	-	48	-
2006	"Dreams" (with Stevie Nicks)	26	-	29	14	42	6	22	-	-	27	-	-
2006	"PATT (Party All the Time)" (by Sharam)	-	-	36	8	30	3	30	-	-	-	36	-

== Awards ==
=== Won ===
- International Dance Music Award 2005 for Best House/Garage Track "Say Hello", Best Progressive/Trance Track "Say Hello" and Ortofon Best American DJ Award
- International Dance Music Awards 2005 for Best Underground Dance Track for "Flashdance"
- DanceStar USA Award 2004 for Best Compilation (US Releases) for Deep Dish - GU 025: Toronto and Best DJ
- Ibiza DJ Award 2004 for Best Set of the Season
- DanceStar USA Award 2002 Best Compilation for Deep Dish - GU 021: Moscow
- Grammy Award 2002 "Best Remixed Recording" for Dido's "Thank You"
- "Hot Duo", Rolling Stone, August 2001
- Muzik Magazine SAS Award 1998 "Best International DJ"

=== Nominations ===
- WMC Best American DJ, 2008
- DJ Awards for Best Tech-House / Progressive DJ, 2006
- Grammy Award 2005 "Best Dance Recording" for Deep Dish's "Say Hello"
- DanceStar USA Award 2004 for Best Remix (Worldwide DJ's) for P. Diddy's "Let's Get Ill" (Deep Dish Remix) (Bad Boy)
- DJ Awards for Best House DJ, 2003
- DanceStar USA Award 2003 Party 93.1 FM Award for Best Remix for Justin Timberlake's "Like I Love You" (Deep Dish remix) (Jive)
- Grammy Award 2001 "Remixer of The Year" (NonClassical)

=== Other rankings ===
- Number 1 in the "Best Progressive DJ" category of BPM magazine's 2006 "America's Favorite DJ's" poll
- Number 2 in the "Best Dance/DJ Artist" category by the critics of Rolling Stone for its music awards of 2001
- Number 10 in DJ Magazine's World's Top 100 DJ's reader's poll for 2006, number 8 for 2005, number 10 for 2004, number 9 for 2003, number 16 in 2002, and number 10 in 2001
- Number 5 out of 50 of America's Favorite DJ's in BPM in 2005, number 12 in 2004 and number 9 in 2003 and 2002
