= List of UK Dance Singles Chart number ones of 1997 =

These are The Official UK Charts Company UK Dance Chart number one hits of 1997. The dates listed in the menus below represent the Saturday after the Sunday the chart was announced, as per the way the dates are given in chart publications such as the ones produced by Billboard, Guinness, and Virgin.

Issue date	Song	Artist
4 January	"The Message"	Shy FX
11 January	"Professional Widow"	Tori Amos
18 January	"People Hold On" (The Bootleg Mixes)	Lisa Stansfield/Dirty Rotten
25 January	"Get Up (Everybody)"	Byron Stingily
1 February	"Remember Me"	Blue Boy
8 February	"Runaway"	Nuyorican Soul feat India
15 February	"Life's Too Short"	Hole in One
22 February	"Da Funk/Musique"	Daft Punk
1 March	"Encore Une Fois"	Sash!
8 March	"Close to Your Heart"	JX
15 March	"Spin Spin Sugar"	Sneaker Pimps
22 March	"Ni Ten Ichi Ryu"	Photek
29 March	"Rock da House"	Tall Paul
5 April	"Bellissima"	DJ Quicksilver
12 April	"My Love Is Deep"	Sara Parker
19 April	"Groovebird"	Natural Born Grooves
26 April	"Around the World"	Daft Punk
3 May	"Nightmare"	Brainbug
10 May	"It's Alright, I Feel It!"	Nuyorican Soul featuring Jocelyn Brown
17 May	"Shine"	Space Brothers
24 May	"Make the World Go Round"	Sandy B
31 May	"RipGroove"	Double 99
7 June	"Closer Than Close"	Rosie Gaines
14 June	"Share the Fall"	Roni Size
21 June	"Deep (I'm Falling Deeper)"	Ariel
28 June	"Casual Sub (Burning Spear)"	ETA
5 July	"Age of Love (The Remixes)"	Age of Love
12 July	"Something Goin' On"	Todd Terry
19 July	"Risingson"	Massive Attack
26 July	"Something Goin' On"	Todd Terry
2 August	"Moment of My Life"	Bobby D'Ambrosio featuring M Weeks
9 August	"Get Up! Go Insane!"	Stretch & Vern ft. Ithaka
16 August	"More Bits and Pieces"	Coldcut
23 August	The Jam EP	A Tribe Called Quest
30 August	"Never Gonna Let You Go"	Tina Moore
6 September	"Anytime"	Nu-Birth
13 September	"Heroes"	Roni Size
20 September	"Turn Me Out (Turn to Sugar)"	Praxis featuring Kathy Brown
27 September	"Circles"	Adam F
4 October	"Sanctuary"	Omni Trio
11 October	"Saturday"	East 57th Street featuring Donna Allen
18 October	"Piper"	Jonny L
25 October	"I Am the Black Gold of the Sun"	Nuyorican Soul featuring Jocelyn Brown
1 November	"Rock the Funky Beat"	Natural Born Chillers
8 November	"Ultrafunkula"	Armand Van Helden
15 November	"Gunman"	187 Lockdown
22 November	"Benedictus"	Brainbug
29 November	"Smack My Bitch Up"	The Prodigy
6 December	"I Thought It Was You"	Sex-O-Sonique
13 December	"My Desire"	Amira
20 December	"Deeper"	Serious Danger
27 December	"Guess Who's Back"	Rakim

== See also ==
- 1997 in music
