= Masters at Work discography =

This is the discography of the American house music group Masters at Work.

== Charted singles ==
As of 2017, Masters at Work singles reached the Billboard Dance Club Songs chart on four occasions.

List of singles, with selected chart positions, showing year released
Title	Year	Peak chart position
Title	Year	US Dance
"I Can't Get No Sleep" (featuring India)	1993	1
"When You Touch Me" (featuring India)	1994	13
"Work" (featuring Pupa Nas-T and Denise Belfon)	2002	7
"Our Time Is Coming"	2002	2
"Backfired" (featuring India)	2002	18

== Discography ==
=== Albums ===
Year	Alias	Title	Ref(s).
1993	Masters at Work	The Album	
1995	Masters at Work	The Essential KenLou House Mixes	
1997	Nuyorican Soul	Nuyorican Soul	
1998	Nuyorican Soul	The Remixes	
2000	Masters at Work	The Tenth Anniversary Collection - Part I	
2000	Masters at Work	The Tenth Anniversary Collection - Part II	
2001	Masters at Work	Our Time is Coming	

=== Singles ===
Year	Alias	Title	Notes	Ref(s).
1991	Masters at Work	"Blood Vibes/The Ha Dance"		
1991	Masters at Work	"Our Mute Horn"	With Ray Vega	
1991	Masters at Work	"69 Steps"		
1992	Masters at Work	"Gonna Get Back to You"	With Xaviera Gold	
1993	Masters at Work	"Can't Stop the Rhythm"	With Jocelyn Brown	
1993	Masters at Work	"Give It to Me"	With Screechie Dan	
1993	Masters at Work	Hardrive EP		
1993	Masters at Work	"I Can't Get No Sleep"	With India	
1993	Masters at Work	"When You Touch Me"	With India	
1993	Nuyorican Soul	"The Nervous Track"		
1994	Masters at Work	"Get Up"		
1994	Voices	"Voices in my Mind"	With India	
1994	People Underground	"My Love"	With Michael Watford	
1995	Masters at Work	"I Can't Get No Sleep '95"	With India; UK #44	
1995	KenLou	"Moonshine/Hillbilly Song"		
1995	KenLou	"The Bounce/Gimme Groove"		
1995	KenLou	"What a Sensation"	With India	
1995	200 Sheep	"The Hard Times March"		
1995	WAM	"The Drum"		
1996	Nuyorican Soul	"Mind Fluid"		
1996	Nuyorican Soul	"Runaway"	With India	
1996	Nuyorican Soul	"You Can Do It (Baby)"	With George Benson	
1996	KenLou	"MAW War/Mack Daddy Shoot"		
1996	Groove Box	"Casio's Theme/The More You Want"		
1996	Groove Box	"Just Be Good to Me"	With Leena Marie	
1997	Masters at Work	"La India Con la Voe"	With India and Albert Menendez	
1997	Masters at Work	"MAW Sampler"		
1997	Masters at Work	"To Be in Love"	With India	
1997	Nuyorican Soul	"I Am the Black Gold of the Sun"	With Jocelyn Brown	
1997	Nuyorican Soul	"It's All Right, I Feel it"	With Jocelyn Brown	
1997	KenLou	"Thru the Skies"		
1997	Black Magic	"Dance (Do That Thang)"		
1997	Black Magic	"Let it Go"		
1998	Masters at Work	"Odyssey/I'm Ready"		
1998	Masters at Work	"Pienso en Ti"	With Luis Salinas	
1998	Nuyorican Soul	"I Love the Nightlife"	With India	
1998	KenLou	"Bangin'"		
1999	Masters at Work	"To Be in Love '99"	With India; UK #23	
1999	Masters at Work	"MAW Expensive"	As MAW presents a Tribute to Fela, with Ibi Wunmi	
2000	Masters at Work	"Brazilian Beat"	With Liliana Chachian	
2000	Masters at Work	"Ékabo"		
2000	Masters at Work	MAW Unreleased Mixes		
2000	Groove Box	"I'm Your Man"		
2001	Masters at Work	"Lean on Me"	With James Ingram	
2001	Masters at Work	"Dubplate Special 1"		
2001	Masters at Work	"Like a Butterfly"	With Patti Austin	
2001	Masters at Work	"Work"	With Pupa Nas-T and Denise Belfon	
2001	Masters at Work	"Dubplate Special 2"		
2001	KenLou	"Gone Three Times"		
2001	Groove Box	"The More You Want"		
2002	Masters at Work	"Backfired"	With India; UK #62	
2002	MAW Electronic	"Tranz/Body"		
2003	Masters at Work	"Dubplate Special 3"		
2003	KenLou	"Where Did It Go"	Bryan Ford on guitar	
2004	MAW Electronic	"Danz/Time Travellers"		
2006	Masters at Work	"Loud"	With Beto Cuevas	
2007	Masters at Work	"Work 2007"	With Pupa Nas-T and Denise Belfon; UK #81	

==== Productions for other artists ====
Year	Artist	Title	Notes	Ref(s).
1993	Freedom Williams	"Voice of Freedom"		
1994	Barbara Tucker	"Beautiful People"		
1994	Willi Ninja	"Hot"		
1997	Byron Stingily	"Flying High"		
1999	Robyn	"Main Thing"		
1999	Robyn	"Good Thang"		
1999	Will Smith	"La Fiesta"	With Keith Pelzer and Jeff Townes	
2001	Jody Watley	"I Love to Love"		
2001	Aaliyah	"More Than A Woman"		
2005	Anané feat. Mr. V	"Let Me Love You"		
2005	Anané feat. Mr. V	"Move, Bounce, Shake"		

=== Mixed compilations ===
Year	Title	Ref(s).
1995	Ministry of Sound Sessions 5	
2001	West End Records: The 25th Anniversary Mastermix	
2004	Defected Presents: Masters at Work - In The House	
2005	The Kings of House	
2006	Soul Heaven Presents: Masters at Work	
2007	Ministry of Sound Chillout Classics	
2007	Strictly MAW	
2014	Defected Presents House Masters - Masters At Work	
2015	Defected Presents House Masters - Masters At Work - Volume Two	

=== Selected remixes ===
Year	Title	Original artist	Ref(s).
1990	"One Step Ahead"	Debbie Gibson	
1991	"Don't Stop Till You Get Enough"	Michael Jackson	
1992	"Chic Mystique"	Chic	
1992	"Work To Do"	Vanessa Williams	
1992	"Crazy Love"	CeCe Peniston	
1992	"Comin' On Strong"	Desiya	
1992	"Rock with You"	Michael Jackson	
1992	"Erotica"	Madonna	
1992	"Time to Make You Mine"	Lisa Stansfield	
1992	"Set Your Loving Free"	Lisa Stansfield	
1993	"Losin' Myself"	Debbie Gibson	
1993	"Emergency on Planet Earth"	Jamiroquai	
1994	"Borrowed Time"	Secret Life	
1994	"Beautiful People"	Barbara Tucker	
1994	"Violently Happy"	Björk	
1995	"I Feel Love"	Donna Summer	
1997	"The Boss"	The Braxtons	
1997	"Song For My Brother"	George Benson	
1997	"Baby I'm In Love"	George Benson	
1997	"Around The World"	Daft Punk	
1998	"Go Deep"	Janet Jackson	
1998	"I Want You Back"	Melanie B feat. Missy Elliott	
1999	"VIP"	Gus Gus	
1999	"Ask for More"	Janet Jackson	
2000	"Get Back"	The Beatles	
2000	"See Line Woman"	Nina Simone	
2000	"Holler"	Spice Girls	
2001	"More Than a Woman"	Aaliyah	
2004	"Free- Louie Vega Mix"	Stephanie Mills	
2004	"The Remix Album, Vol.1"	4Hero	
2014	"Last Dance"	Donna Summer	
