= Giant Step =

US record label

- Founded: 1990
- Founder: Maurice Bernstein, Jonathan Rudnick (1990–2001)
- Status: Active
- Country of origin: United States
- Location: New York City, Los Angeles
- Official website: giantstep.net

Giant Step is a media, events and marketing company headquartered in New York City and Los Angeles. The company formerly released music through its record label, Giant Step Records. Giant Step is divided into two entities – the Giant Step brand, which promotes music and the creative agency, Giant Step Marketing, which provides marketing services to consumer brands.

== History ==
=== The Groove Academy and early years ===
Groove Academy began in 1990 as a party in New York City. The party was a weekly production of British promoter, Maurice Bernstein, and his South African partner, Jonathan Rudnick. Initially unable to secure a loan from the bank, the pair borrowed money and used it to book acts and venues. "The stars of the 70s, although they were highly sampled, were not getting recognition and were not being presented in a live forum," recalls Rudnick. The two called their events, Groove Academy with its slogan, "Dedicated to the preservation of Funk."

Bernstein recalled, "The first Groove Academy shows were put on by literally looking up artists in the telephone book … None of them had agents then, we’d just call them up at home and say ‘are you interested in doing a show with us?’ The two called their events Groove Academy with its slogan, "Dedicated to the preservation of Funk" and began rediscovering musicians whose records they had collected as teenagers.

The events were extended onto the dance floor under the new name Giant Step, after the fabled John Coltrane album Giant Steps. The Giant Step party differentiated itself from Groove Academy with its emphasis on mixing Jazz and Hip hop. Giant Step would soon go on tour around the States, Europe and Japan.

=== Giant Step party (1990s to early 2000s) ===
The Giant Step party started off as a weekly event that mixed live jazz and hip hop. While The Groove Academy staged concerts with Maceo Parker, Isaac Hayes, The Ohio Players and George Clinton, Bernstein and Rudnick extended onto the dancefloor with their Giant Step party. Greatly influenced by the acid jazz club-nights in England, like Gilles Peterson's Talkin' Loud And Sayin' Something, Giant Step offered a stage where visiting rappers and jazz musicians, along with the regular Giant Step band, improvised to prerecorded hip-hop and funk. Giant Step helped emerging acid jazz artists, like the Digable Planets, The Brand New Heavies and Jamiroquai, launch their stateside careers. Many other notable artists debuted at Giant Step shows as well including The Fugees and Massive Attack. The party originally took place at SOB's but later moved to other venues such as Metropolis Café, Supper Club, Shine, New Music Café and the Village Gate. In 2002 the weekly party was discontinued. Later the Giant Step party would be re-launched at the Hudson Hotel. Giant Step's events expanded into select markets outside of New York City, including shows in Los Angeles, Miami, Chicago and Washington DC.

=== Record label ===
As the events continued to expand in the mid-1990s, Giant Step moved into management, signing Dana Bryant, Repercussions (band), and Groove Collective, securing record deals for the three on Warner Brothers. Other artists managed include Raw Stylus, whom Giant Step signed to Geffen Records. During this time Giant Step worked with Gary Katz, best known for his work with Steely Dan, to help produce the albums for Groove Collective, Repercussions (band) and Raw Stylus. In 1995, record producer Tommy Lipuma took over GRP Records at MCA Records and invited Giant Step to set up there as an imprint label. The first act to be signed to the label was the jazz group, Groove Collective.

In early 1997, Giant Step achieved acclaim for their work with Nuyorican Soul and a partnership with Gilles Peterson’s label, Talkin Loud. The group was a collaboration between Latin house DJs, "Little" Louie Vega and Kenny "Dope" Gonzales, who were also commonly known as Masters at Work. Nuyorican Soul featured many real musicians as opposed to sampled or synthesized sounds. Musicians who took part in the project included George Benson, Tito Puente, Roy Ayers, Jazzy Jeff, Jocelyn Brown, and salsa queen, India. Three singles from the first Nuyorican Soul album made it to the top of the Billboard Charts; "Runaway", "You Can Do It (Baby)" and "I Am The Black Gold Of The Sun." The album, released in March 2007, sold over 50,000 units by the end of July the same year. Epic Records soon approached Bernstein and Rudnick with an offer. Although Giant Step was a music label, Epic Records was primarily interested in Giant Step's marketing capabilities and offered the company a retainer contract where their record label was a secondary priority.

=== Music marketing and label discontinuation ===
For their first project with Epic Records, Giant Step helped launch the career of Macy Gray, followed by Jill Scott and the re-launch of Sade. The company promoted Macy Gray by getting her music played in cafés, clubs, and restaurants. According to Rose Noone, VP of A&R at Epic Records, the music was "heard everywhere." Giant Step went on to help Def Jam Records artist Musiq Soulchild by pushing his music in untapped markets. The previously unknown singer sold 55,000 copies of his debut album in its first week.

Although, Giant Step Records released a Gilles Peterson compilation with Epic Records, Bernstein and Rudnick eventually grew frustrated with having an imprint deal. Corporate management denied their requests to sign artists like India Arie and Donnie, and so in 2000, Giant Step decided to start their own label. However the following year, Rudnick would leave company to pursue other interests. With money received from Epic, Bernstein started work on a series of tracks with singer, Donnie, that would eventually become the album, Welcome to the Colored Section. Steve "The Scotman" Harvey was enlisted as the Music producer. Singles from this album include, "Do You Know" and "Cloud9". Welcome to the Colored Section was called "the best soul record since Stevie Wonder's masterpieces of the 1970s," by the Boston Globe. The independent success of Welcome to the Colored Section, brought a joint venture with Motown Records and private investment into the label. Giant Step has also released albums for Carl Hancock, Gilles Peterson, Turntables on the Hudson, Ultra Nate, Zero 7, Jody Watley, Donnie, Sara Devine, Jiva and Zap Mama.

However the venture had many operating issues. Its financial troubles threatened Giant Step's marketing business and the company nearly shut down. After an expected second round of investment didn't come through, the label ground to a halt in 2005. With the record label closed, Giant Step focused its efforts on developing their marketing business. Giant Step soon entered a collaboration with Sade, and helped the artist sell 400,000 copies of her album during its first week in stores. In 2006, Universal Republic Records hired Giant Step to promote then-unknown Amy Winehouse – the company's grassroots campaign was acknowledge for supporting Winehouse's cross over into the mainstream in 2007. Other notable artists that were launched through Giant Step's music marketing program include Lady Gaga, Janelle Monáe and Adele.

== Creative agency era ==
=== 2000s ===
After an initial foray with Levi's Miles Ahead Music Series and LG, Giant Step expanded into brand marketing with their creative agency, Giant Step Marketing. The company's work with the Levi's Miles Ahead Series debuted Jill Scott, Air and Massive Attack. The series also featured bands such as Femi Kuti, Kruder & Dorfmeister, Fatboy Slim, Morcheeba, Bebel Gilberto, and Terry Callier. For LG, the agency coordinated press outreach, online promotions, and venues to help launch LG’s new mobile phone line. Events included performances by Jurassic 5, Thievery Corporation, The Pharcyde, Zero 7, Van Hunt, Miss Kittin, Raphael Saadiq, and Everything But The Girl.

Between 2007 and 2011, Giant Step Marketing produced music events for Ian Schrager's Morgans Hotel Group. This series included two years of Grammy and Fashion week events and featured artists such as The Roots, Common, Grace Jones, Erykah Badu, Janelle Monáe, Estelle, De La Soul, and The Kills. In 2009, Svedka was brought in as a sponsor and the programs were expanded into the Svedka Future Music Series. Notable musicians featured in the series include Robyn, Wale, Mark Ronson, N.E.R.D., Fitz and the Tantrums, Janelle Monáe, and Daft Punk.

From 2008 to 2011, Giant Step Marketing launched Steve Madden Music. The company created branded content, executed social media and online publicity campaigns and produced an experiential marketing program that aligned the brand with artists such as Katy Perry, Lady Gaga, K’Naan, Katy B, and Melanie Fiona.

=== Notable campaigns (2011 and beyond) ===
In 2011, Giant Step worked with music producer David Guetta to create awareness for Coca-Cola’s energy drink, Burn. Later in 2011 Giant Step Marketing promoted the launch of Barneys New York’s "Gaga’s Workshop," a holiday collaboration with Lady Gaga. The company provided PR, social media, digital and experiential campaigns.

Giant Step Marketing produced and promoted the "Music Experiment 2.0" concert series in 2013 for Intel and Viacom. The series featured artists such as Arcade Fire, Empire of the Sun, and Disclosure and was broadcast on MTV Iggy and via livestream; the Arcade Fire show was also broadcast on "Jimmy Kimmel Live!" in partnership with ABC. The Intel series was later recognized with a silver Clio Award in 2014.

Bernstein was tapped by Samsung Electronics America in 2015 to serve as interim general manager of its planned flagship experience center, and to oversee the opening of the building. Bernstein and Giant Step Marketing operated as Samsung's in-house agency, with the sole focus of launching Samsung 837 in 2016. A first of its kind building in the heart of the Meatpacking District in Manhattan, Samsung 837 is home to concerts, cultural events, screenings, and immersive experiences. The building, which has been recognized as a forerunner in the experiential retail category and was awarded "Best Store Design of the Year," showcases Samsung's technology in all of its programming.

In 2017, Giant Step Marketing was engaged by W Hotels and Marriott International to develop an integrated music platform, which eventually became W Records, the world's first-ever hotel music label. In its first year, W Records signed and released new music from artists such as Amber Mark, Perfume Genius, Roosevelt and Japanese Breakfast. In September 2019, Giant Step was recognized with a bronze Clio Award for W Records, in the "Integrated Campaign" category.

In addition to its campaign work, Giant Step Marketing is frequently hired to produce concerts for consumer brands, including the opening of the Times Square EDITION Hotel with Diana Ross and Nile Rodgers, the launch of SoundCloud Go with Chance the Rapper, Spotify's Latin Grammy Awards party with J Balvin, Daddy Yankee and Luis Fonsi, and Lincoln Motor Company’s concert series featuring Gary Clark Jr. Giant Step Marketing has been named in Event Marketer’s annual "It List" of the world's top 100 event agencies every year since 2014.

=== Creative agency clients (past and present) ===
Absolut (Pernod Ricard), Adidas, Bacardi, Barneys New York, Coca-Cola, Clarks, EDITION Hotels, HBO, HP Inc., Intel, Levi's, LG Corporation, Marriott International, Morgans Hotel Group, MTV (Viacom), Old Navy, SoundCloud, Spotify, Sundance TV, The Lincoln Motor Company, Red Bull, Steve Madden, Western Union, W Hotels.

== Legacy ==
=== Logo ===
After seeing an ad in the newspaper in 1992, Rhode Island School of Design graduate, Kevin Lyons knocked on the door of Giant Step's offices. There he met Bernstein and Rudnick who were impressed with his sketchbook and gave him a shot at designing Giant Step's logo. The opportunity "opened lots of doors" for Lyons, who went on to become a celebrated artist, creating products with Nike, Adidas, Converse, Vans, Uniqlo and Colette, among others.

=== Anthony Bourdain ===
The original Giant Step party from the early 1990s is referenced in the late Anthony Bourdain's bestselling memoir Kitchen Confidential: Adventures in the Culinary Underbelly (2000).

=== No Sleep ===
Giant Step is featured in a dedicated section of DJ Stretch Armstrong and hip hop historian Evan Auerbach's 2016 book No Sleep: NYC Nightlife Flyers 1988-1999, a visual history documenting New York nightlife between the late 1980s and 1990s. In the book's introduction by Mark Ronson, the original Giant Step club night is described as the "holy grail of hip New York" at the time.

=== Giant Step Presents (2012 to present day) ===
Giant Step continues to present different iterations of its original party under the "Giant Step Presents" banner. Giant Step was revived as a seasonal party at Le Bain in New York from 2013 to 2018, featuring DJs such as Questlove, Rich Medina, Ron Trent, Danny Krivit and King Britt. In 2012, Giant Step partnered with Q-Tip to present the Offline Party series in New York. On why he chose to partner with Giant Step, Q-Tip cited that "their brand and their quality are unmatched." Giant Step continues to present an annual summer concert in New York's Central Park, as a part of the Central Park Summer Stage series.
