= Nickodemus (DJ) =

American Musician and Disc Jockey

- Born: Nicolas DeSimone; The Bronx, New York City
- Origin: New York City, U.S.A
- Genres: Hip hop; nu jazz; deep house
- Years active: 1998–present
- Labels: Turntables on the Hudson; Wonderwheel Recordings

Nickodemus (born Nicolas DeSimone) is an American DJ and musician, known for co-founding the Turntables on the Hudson music event and founding the Wonderwheel Recordings record label.

== Early life ==
DeSimone was born and raised in The Bronx, New York City. His interest in music began at a young age, listening to hip hop, reggae, and house music, and often attending music events in the 1990s.

== Career ==
Nickodemus began his DJ career at the age of 14 in New York, blending various music genres such as jazz, hip-hop, and reggae.

=== Turntables on the Hudson ===
In 1998, DeSimone co-founded the Turntables on the Hudson music event, along with percussionist Nappy G and DJ Mariano. Before this, he often performed at Giant Step parties.

As part of the event, he has also performed internationally on multiple occasions, such as at "Turntables on the Nile" events in Cairo, Egypt; the Candela Arts and Music Festival at Old San Juan, Puerto Rico; and Barcelona, Spain.

=== Wonderwheel Recordings ===
Nickodemus founded the Wonderwheel Recordings record label in 2003, and currently runs it alongside Aaron "DRM" Schultz.

== Discography ==
=== Studio albums ===
- Endangered Species (2005)
- Sun People (2009)
- Moon People (2012)
- A Long Engagement (2018)
- Soul & Science (2023)

=== Remix albums ===
- Sun People Remixed (2009)
- The Remix Machine Vol. 2 (2023)

== In popular culture ==
Various tracks by Nickodemus are featured in the 2009 video game Grand Theft Auto: Chinatown Wars, which can be accessed through the in-game "Turntables on the Hudson" radio station.

DeSimone's single, "Mi Swing Es Tropical", made in collaboration with Quantic, has been featured in the 2014 film Chef and the 2022 TV series The Lincoln Lawyer.
