= List of UK R&B Singles Chart number ones of 1997 =

The UK R&B Chart is a weekly chart that ranks the 40 biggest-selling singles and albums that are classified in the R&B genre in the United Kingdom. The chart is compiled by the Official Charts Company, and is based on physical and other physical formats. This is a list of the UK's biggest R&B hits of 1997.

== Number ones ==
†	Best-selling R&B single of the year

Issue date	Single	Artist
5 January	"Don't Let Go (Love)"	En Vogue
12 January	"Don't Let Go (Love)"	En Vogue
19 January	"Street Dreams"	Nas
26 January	"Remember Me"	Blue Boy
2 February ^{[a]}	"Ain't Nobody"	LL Cool J
9 February	"Ain't Nobody"	LL Cool J
16 February	"I Shot the Sheriff"	Warren G
23 February	"I Shot the Sheriff"	Warren G
2 March	"Don't You Love Me"	Eternal
9 March	"Rumble in the Jungle"	Fugees featuring A Tribe Called Quest, Busta Rhymes and John Forté
16 March	"Rumble in the Jungle"	Fugees featuring A Tribe Called Quest, Busta Rhymes and John Forté
23 March	"I Believe I Can Fly"	R. Kelly
30 March	"I Believe I Can Fly"	R. Kelly
6 April ^{[a]}	"I Believe I Can Fly"	R. Kelly
13 April ^{[a]}	"I Believe I Can Fly"	R. Kelly
20 April ^{[a]}	"I Believe I Can Fly"	R. Kelly
27 April ^{[a]}	"Blood on the Dance Floor"	Michael Jackson
4 May	"Alright"	Jamiroquai
11 May	"Wonderful Tonight"	Damage
18 May	"Wonderful Tonight"	Damage
25 May ^{[a]}	"I Wanna Be the Only One"	Eternal featuring BeBe Winans
1 June	"I Wanna Be the Only One"	Eternal featuring BeBe Winans
8 June	"I Wanna Be the Only One"	Eternal featuring BeBe Winans
15 June	"I Wanna Be the Only One"	Eternal featuring BeBe Winans
22 June ^{[a]}	"I'll Be Missing You" †	Puff Daddy featuring Faith Evans and 112
29 June ^{[a]}	"I'll Be Missing You" †	Puff Daddy featuring Faith Evans and 112
6 July ^{[a]}	"I'll Be Missing You" †	Puff Daddy featuring Faith Evans and 112
13 July	"I'll Be Missing You" †	Puff Daddy featuring Faith Evans and 112
20 July ^{[a]}	"I'll Be Missing You" †	Puff Daddy featuring Faith Evans and 112
27 July ^{[a]}	"I'll Be Missing You" †	Puff Daddy featuring Faith Evans and 112
3 August ^{[a]}	"I'll Be Missing You" †	Puff Daddy featuring Faith Evans and 112
10 August ^{[a]}	"Men in Black"	Will Smith
17 August ^{[a]}	"Men in Black"	Will Smith
24 August ^{[a]}	"Men in Black"	Will Smith
31 August ^{[a]}	"Men in Black"	Will Smith
7 September	"Men in Black"	Will Smith
14 September	"Men in Black"	Will Smith
21 September	"Fix"	Blackstreet
28 September	"Never Gonna Let You Go"	Tina Moore
5 October	"Angel of Mine"	Eternal
12 October	"Angel of Mine"	Eternal
19 October	"Angel of Mine"	Eternal
26 October	"Phenomenon"	LL Cool J
2 November	"Angel of Mine"	Eternal
9 November	"Angel of Mine"	Eternal
16 November	"Never Ever"	All Saints
23 November	"Never Ever"	All Saints
30 November	"Never Ever"	All Saints
7 December	"Together Again"	Janet Jackson
14 December	"Never Ever"	All Saints
21 December	"Never Ever"	All Saints
28 December	"Never Ever"	All Saints

== Notes ==
- ^{a} - The single was simultaneously number one on the UK Singles Chart.

== See also ==
- List of UK Dance Singles Chart number ones of 1997
- List of UK Independent Singles Chart number ones of 1997
- List of UK Rock & Metal Singles Chart number ones of 1997
- List of UK R&B Albums Chart number ones of 1997
