= It's Alright, I Feel It! =

Single by Nuyorican Soul

from the album Nuyorican Soul
- B-side: "Remix"
- Released: 1997
- Genre: Disco; funk; house; Latin
- Length: 3:20
- Label: Talkin' Loud
- Songwriters: Bennie Diggs; Jocelyn Brown; Carl K. Gonzalez; Luis F. Vega
- Producers: "Little" Louie Vega; Kenny "Dope" Gonzalez

Nuyorican Soul singles chronology
| "Runaway" (1996) | "It's Alright, I Feel It!" (1997) | "I am the Black Gold of the Sun" (1997) |

Music video
- "It's Alright, I Feel It!" on YouTube

"It's Alright, I Feel It!" is a song by Nuyorican Soul, a project by the house-garage production and remix team of "Little" Louie Vega and Kenny "Dope" Gonzalez. It features American singer Jocelyn Brown, who also co-wrote it, and was released in 1997, by Talkin' Loud, as the third single from their debut album, Nuyorican Soul (1997). The song peaked at number 34 on the UK Singles Chart and number one on the UK Dance Singles Chart, while in the US, it reached number three on the Billboard Hot Dance Club Play chart.

== Critical reception ==
Larry Flick from Billboard magazine felt the third single from Nuyorican Soul's "groundbreaking" debut disc "showcases the vocals of club legend Jocelyn Brown, who steamrolls through this sweet funk/disco number with her typical blend of no-non-sense aggression and soulful flair. The hook is immediate, and the live instrumentation provides a wonderful warmth that is missing from most other dance records right now. Turntable artists who need a more dubby vibe will be pleased to discover a wealth of remixes that are wisely trend-conscious. None of these versions, however can hold a candle to the original production by "Little" Louie Vega and Kenny "Dope" Gonzalez, which is where musically savvy listeners should instantly gravitate."

British magazine Music Week gave it a score of four out of five, stating that "this frantic groover, with its slinky, funky soul reinforced by Jocelyn Brown's soaring vocals, sounds like one of the first sounds of the summer. Top notch." Daisy & Havoc from the RM Dance Update named it House Tune of the Week and gave it five out of five, adding, "If you failed to get your hands on the whistle-and-you-missed-it 'Nuyorican Soul' album, perhaps the biggest loss you suffered was this tremendous track sung by the inimitable Jocelyn Brown. Its a beautiful downtempo piece of unashamed rejoicing in the power of music and indeed the voices of Brown and her marvellous backing singers. Packed full of cliches, the "power of the groove", a great breakdown and such old-fashioned devices as never-ending tinkling ivories, it will bring tears to your eyes - especially if your faith in music, the power of the groove and so on, is in any doubt."

== Impact and legacy ==
In 1997, Singaporean DJ, co-founder and managing director of Zouk Kuala Lumpur DJ Cher included the track in his top 10, saying, "It's going to be a classic, that's for sure. It's the kind of song that doesn't come that often and when you hear it you know it'll be an instant hit." In 2024, DJ Mag featured it in their list of "40 Essential Tracks from 40 Years of House Music". American DJ and record producer Mike Dunn stated, "One of my all-time favourites."

== Track listing ==
- 12", UK (1997)

A1. "It's Alright, I Feel It!" (M.A.W. 12" Mix) – 9:47
A2. "It's Alright, I Feel It!" (Rascal Beats) – 3:49
B. "It's Alright, I Feel It!" (Roni Size Remix) – 13:14

- CD single, US (1997)
1. "It's Alright, I Feel It!" (Edit) – 4:05
2. "It's Alright, I Feel It!" (M.A.W. Remix) – 9:49
3. "It's Alright, I Feel It!" (Live From Da Darkside Of Da Moon) – 11:32
4. "It's Alright, I Feel It!" (Roni Size Remix) – 13:16
5. "It's Alright, I Feel It!" (Mood II Swing Remix) – 8:11
- CD maxi, UK (1997)
1. "It's Alright, I Feel It!" (Radio Edit) – 3:20
2. "It's Alright, I Feel It!" (M.A.W. Remix) – 9:48
3. "It's Alright, I Feel It!" (Live From Da Darkside Of Da Moon) – 11:36

== Charts ==
=== Weekly charts ===
| Chart (1997) | Peak position |
|---|---|
| Scotland (OCC) | 34 |
| UK Singles (OCC) | 26 |
| UK Dance (OCC) | 1 |
| US Hot Dance Club Play (Billboard) | 3 |

=== Year-end charts ===
| Chart (1997) | Position |
|---|---|
| UK Club Chart (Music Week) | 100 |
