= Nuyorican Soul (album) =

Studio album by Nuyorican Soul
- Released: January 29, 1997
- Genre: Salsa; Latin; soul; house; jazz
- Length: 74:03
- Label: Talkin' Loud
- Producer: Little Louie Vega; Kenny "Dope" Gonzalez

Nuyorican Soul chronology
Nuyorican Soul (1997)	The Remixes (1998)

Singles from Nuyorican Soul
- 1. "Runaway" Released: 1996; 2. "You Can Do It (Baby)" Released: 1996; 3. "It's Alright, I Feel It!" Released: 1997; 4. "I Am the Black Gold of the Sun" Released: 1997

Nuyorican Soul is the debut studio album by Nuyorican Soul, released in 1997. It featured guest appearances from George Benson, Roy Ayers, Tito Puente, DJ Jazzy Jeff, Jocelyn Brown, Vincent Montana Jr., Salsoul Orchestra, and India. It peaked at number 25 on the UK Albums Chart.

== Critical reception ==
Professional ratings
Review scores
Source	Rating
AllMusic	4.5/5 stars
BBC	(favorable)
Muzik	10/10
NME	4/10
The Times	(favorable)

John Bush of AllMusic said: "In keeping with Masters at Work's heritage, most of the album is Latin in feel and jazzy in composition, but with ever-present synths and piano runs that belie their heavy dance heritage." He called it "one of the best all-star dance albums ever recorded."

== Track listing ==
No.	Title	Length
1.	"Nuyorican Soul (Intro)"	1:24
2.	"I Am the Black Gold of the Sun"	5:19
3.	"It's Alright, I Feel It!"	3:18
4.	"MAW Latin Blues"	6:19
5.	"Gotta New Life"	4:26
6.	"Nautilus"	7:12
7.	"Taita Caneme"	4:59
8.	"Habriendo el Dominante"	6:08
9.	"Roy's Scat"	3:07
10.	"Sweet Tears"	5:10
11.	"Runaway"	7:53
12.	"Shoshana"	7:12
13.	"Jazzy Jeff's Theme"	2:53
14.	"You Can Do It (Baby)"	8:43

1997 European limited edition bonus disc
No.	Title	Length
1.	"The Nervous Track"	6:25
2.	"Mind Fluid"	6:35
3.	"Makes Your Nature Rise"	5:00

1997 Japanese limited edition bonus disc
No.	Title	Length
1.	"The Nervous Track"	6:25
2.	"Mind Fluid"	6:35
3.	"Makes Your Nature Rise"	5:00
4.	"Runaway (Original 12")"	9:55
5.	"Runaway (Bonus Beats)"	2:38
6.	"Runaway (Mousse T's Jazz Funk Experience)"	8:19
7.	"It's Alright, I Feel It! (Full Length Version)"	9:48

2006 reissue edition bonus disc
No.	Title	Length
1.	"Runaway (India's Ambient Dream)"	2:51
2.	"I Am the Black Gold of the Sun (MAW Remix)" (featuring Q-Tip)	7:03
3.	"Mind Fluid"	6:02
4.	"It's Alright, I Feel It! (M.A.W. 12" Mix)"	9:49
5.	"Runaway (Original Flava 12")"	9:55
6.	"Makes Your Nature Rise"	5:00
7.	"The Nervous Track"	6:25
8.	"Runaway (Armand Van Helden Mix)"	8:37

== Personnel ==
=== Musicians ===
- Bobby Allende – congas, percussion
- John Allmark – trumpet, muted trumpet
- Richard Amaroso – cello
- Orest Artymiw – violin
- Roy Ayers – scat, vibraphone, vocals, background vocals
- Catrice Barnes – background vocals
- Davis A. Barnett – viola
- Diane Barnett – violin
- Rocco Bene – trumpet
- Patricia Brown – violin
- Terry Burrus – piano
- Kathleen Carroll – viola
- Edward Cascarella – trombone
- Tony Cintron – drums
- José "Cochi" Claussell – timbales
- Starvin' T. Cordero – congas, percussion
- Peter Daou – Fender Rhodes, keyboards
- Dave Darlington – keyboards
- Vidal Davis – drums
- Benny Diggs – background vocals
- Sarah Dubois – violin
- Lisa Fischer – arranger, scat, vocal arrangement, background vocals
- Richie Flores – bongos, congas, percussion
- Richard Genovese – bass trombone
- Edward Golazewski – baritone sax
- Roger Harrington – violin
- Carlos "El Nene" Henrique – bass
- Ronnie James – guitar
- Bashiri Johnson – percussion
- Richard Jones – violin, background vocals
- Olga Konopelsky – violin
- Victoria Ann Matosich – viola
- Andy McCloud III – bass, upright bass
- Paulette McWilliams – background vocals
- Albert Sterling Menendez – keyboards
- Cindy Mizelle – background vocals
- Diane Monroe – violin
- Vince Montana – arranger, conductor, Fender Rhodes, string arrangements, vibraphone
- Michael Natalie – trumpet
- Peter Nocella – viola
- Brian Pastor – trombone
- Gene Perez – bass
- Anthony Pirollo – cello
- Anthony Posk – violin
- Pamela Posk – violin
- James Preston – Fender Rhodes
- Marc Quiñones – timbales
- Luisito Quintero – percussion, timbales
- George Rabbai – trumpet
- Christine Reeves – violin
- Kimberly Reighley – flute
- Melvin Roundtree – violin
- David Sanchez – saxophone
- Richard Schwartz – French horn
- Ira Segal – guitar
- Charlie Sepúlveda – trumpet
- Richard Shade – background vocals
- Barbara Sonies – violin
- Igor Szwec – violin
- Gregory Teperman – violin
- Kathleen Thomas – violin
- Steve Turre – percussion, trombone
- Eric Velez – bongos, congas

=== Guest artists ===
- George Benson – guitar, vocals
- Jocelyn Brown – scat, vocals, background vocals
- DJ Jazzy Jeff – turntables
- India – Spanish translation, vocal arrangement, vocals, background vocals
- Eddie Palmieri – piano synthesizer
- Tito Puente – timbales, vibraphone
- Hilton Ruiz – arranger, horn arrangements, organ (Hammond), piano
- Dave Valentin – flute

=== Production ===
- Kenny "Dope" Gonzalez – producer
- Little Louie Vega – producer
- Steven Barkan – engineer, mixing, mixing engineer
- Dave Darlington – engineer, mixing, mixing engineer
- Gene Leone – engineer, string engineer
- Arthur Stoppe – engineer, string engineer
- Oscar Monsalve – assistant engineer
- Phil Pagano – assistant engineer
- Dan Yashiz – assistant engineer

== Charts ==
Chart	Peak position
UK Albums (OCC)	25
US Heatseekers Albums (Billboard)	27
US Jazz Albums (Billboard)	3
US Top R&B/Hip-Hop Albums (Billboard)	58
