= Mister V =

Mister V may refer to:

== Music ==
- Mister V (rapper), Yvick Letexier, French YouTuber, comedian, rapper, and actor
- Mr. V, Victor Font, an American DJ, producer, and vocalist

== Films and television ==
- "Pimpernel" Smith (released in the United States as Mister V), a 1941 British anti-Nazi thriller
- Mister V. [fr], a 2003 French film directed by Émilie Deleuze
