= ZoukOut =

Dance festival in Singapore

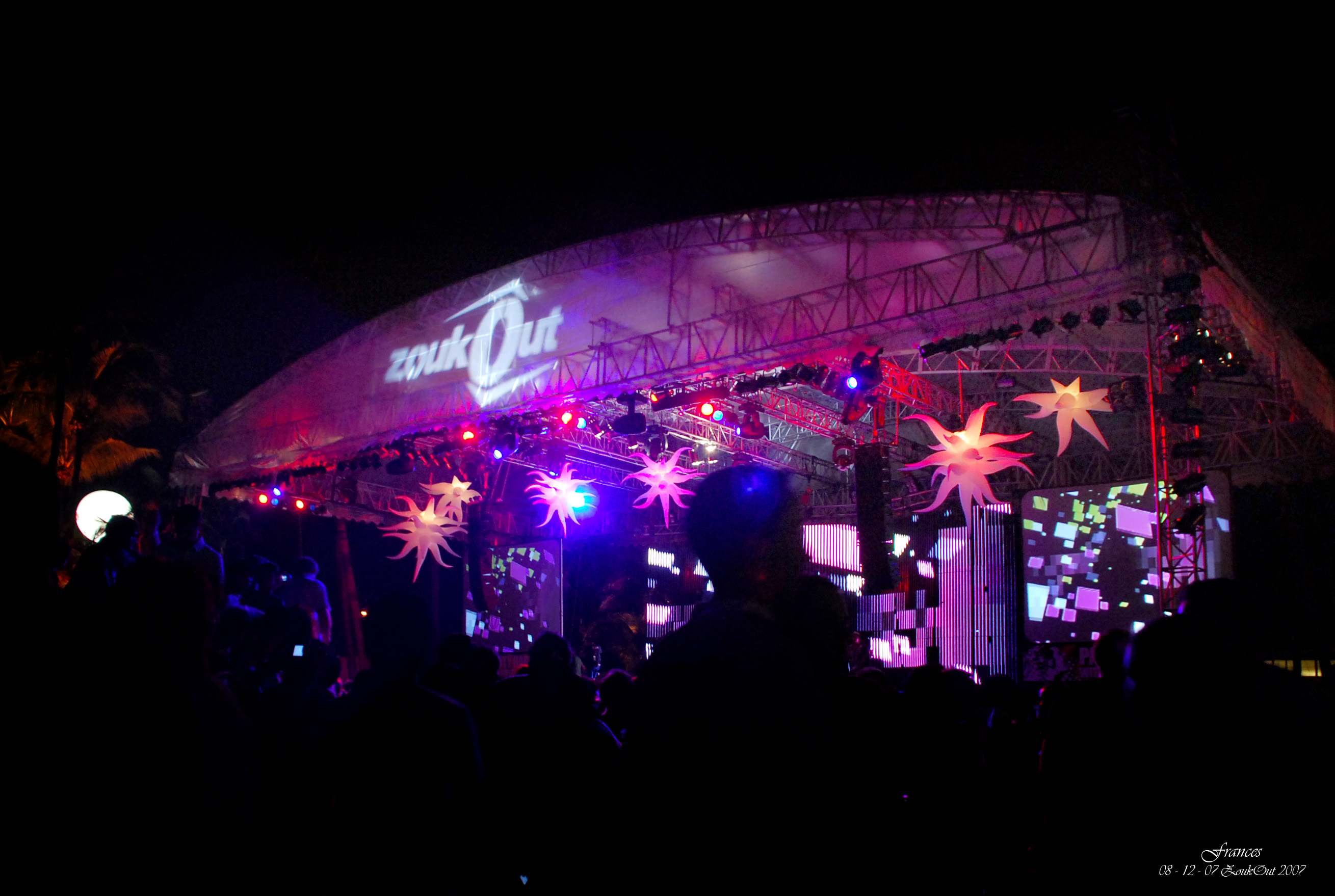
- Genre: Electronic dance music
- Location: Singapore
- Years active: 2001-present

ZoukOut is an annual dance music festival held in Singapore since 2001. One of Asia's biggest music dance festivals, it is organised by Zouk Singapore. DJs that have performed at ZoukOut include Paul Van Dyk, 2ManyDJS, Masters at Work, Gilles Peterson, Richie Hawtin, Sven Väth, Peter Kruder, James Lavelle, Armin Van Buuren and Stereo MC's.

== History ==
In 2001, Zouk started an all-night dance music festival, ZoukOut. The dance festival was held at Siloso Beach at Sentosa, Singapore.

ZoukOut 2010 celebrated 10 years of the festival in December 2010. It was held on Saturday, 11 December at Siloso Beach, Sentosa Island from 8pm-8am. The three headline acts performed at ZoukOut 2010 were multi-platinum selling artiste David Guetta, world-renowned trance DJ Tiësto and Grammy award-winning DJ Jazzy Jeff. The 10th anniversary saw a record attendance of 28,000 party-goers. As a result of such high demand from people wanting to attend and its growth in popularity, ZoukOut set out to hold the event from 2012 on a two-day basis (Friday & Saturday).

ZoukOut has since held the festival for two-days at Siloso Beach, Sentosa over the past few years. The 17th edition of Zoukout took place on 8–9 December 2017 at Siloso Beach and featured a gamut of acts, including Hip-Hop, Techno, House, Commercial EDM, Trance and more.

In 2019, ZoukOut announced they will not be holding the festival. From 2020 to 2021, ZoukOut was not held due to the COVID-19 pandemic in Singapore.

In 2022, ZoukOut was held on 3 and 4 December. Due to the earlier heavy rain, a VIP area was sunk in and the police went to assist in evacuating the people. During the evacuation, police officers were reportedly splashed with an "unknown liquid believed to be alcohol". A 32-year-old woman was arrested for allegedly "using criminal force to deter public servants from discharge of their duties".

On 1 July, Zoukout released a promotional campaign indicating Zoukout 2023 will be held again at the usual spot of Siloso Beach, Sentosa Island. Headliners include Alesso and FISHER. 2023 ZoukOut : Martin Garrix Alesso FISHER ILLENIUM

== Accolades ==
ZoukOut has also won the Singapore Tourism Board’s “Best Leisure Event Experience” award thrice, between 2005 and 2020.

== See also ==
- List of electronic music festivals
