= Kung-Fu (187 Lockdown song) =

Single by 187 Lockdown

from the album 187
- Released: 13 April 1998
- Genre: Speed garage
- Label: EastWest
- Songwriter(s): Danny Harrison, Julian Jonah
- Producer(s): Danny Harrison, Julian Jonah

187 Lockdown singles chronology
"Gunman" (1997)	"Kung-Fu" (1998)	"Gunman (re-release)" (1998)

"Kung-Fu" is a song by English speed garage duo 187 Lockdown, released on 13 April 1998. The song was a top 10 hit, peaking at No. 9 on the UK Singles Chart. It also reached No. 1 on the UK Dance Singles Chart.

The song contains vocal samples from Street Fighter II, Mortal Kombat 2 and FX & Scratches Vol. 5 by Simon Harris.

Mixmag included "Kung-Fu" in their list of "The 15 Best Speed Garage Records Released in '97 and '98".

== Track listing ==
UK CD single

1. "Kung-Fu" (Radio Edit) (3:34)
2. "Kung-Fu" (Ramsey and Fen Remix) (5:50)
3. "Kung-Fu" (Prisoners of Technology/TMS 1 Remix One) (6:33)
4. "Kung-Fu" (Original 187 Mix) (6:31)
5. "Kung-Fu" (Prisoners of Technology/TMS 1 Remix Two) (6:33)
6. "Kung-Fu" (187 Lockdown Instrumental) (6:27)

== Charts ==
Chart (1998)	Peak position
Scotland (OCC)	21
UK Singles (OCC)	9
UK Dance (Official Charts Company)	1
