= 4x4 garage =

4x4 garage (also 4/4, 4x4, four-to-the-floor) is an umbrella term, associated with the UK garage scene. It can refer to:

- Speed garage, a genre of underground music, popular in mid-late 1990s.
- Bassline, a genre of music that heavily resembles speed garage and was formed under defining influence of it.
