= Masters at Work =

American garage house production and remix team

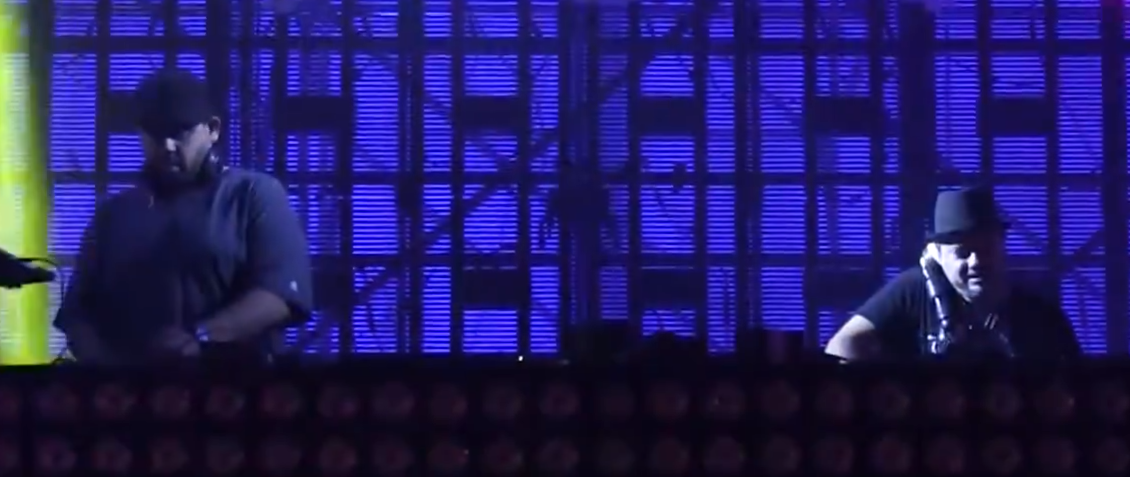
- Masters at Work in 2013

Background information
- Also known as: MAW; KenLou; Sole Fusion; Nuyorican Soul; River Ocean
- Origin: New York City, U.S.
- Genres: House; garage
- Works: Masters at Work discography
- Years active: 1990–present
- Labels: Cutting (1993); MAW (1998–present); Tommy Boy; Giant Step/Blue Thumb/GRP/MCA
- Members: "Little" Louie Vega; Kenny "Dope" Gonzalez
- Past members: Todd Terry

Masters at Work is the American garage house production and remix team of "Little" Louie Vega and Kenny "Dope" Gonzalez. The duo has produced music together under the names MAW, KenLou, Sole Fusion, Hardrive, and Nuyorican Soul. They have been referred to as one of the most influential artists in the history of house music.

== Biography ==
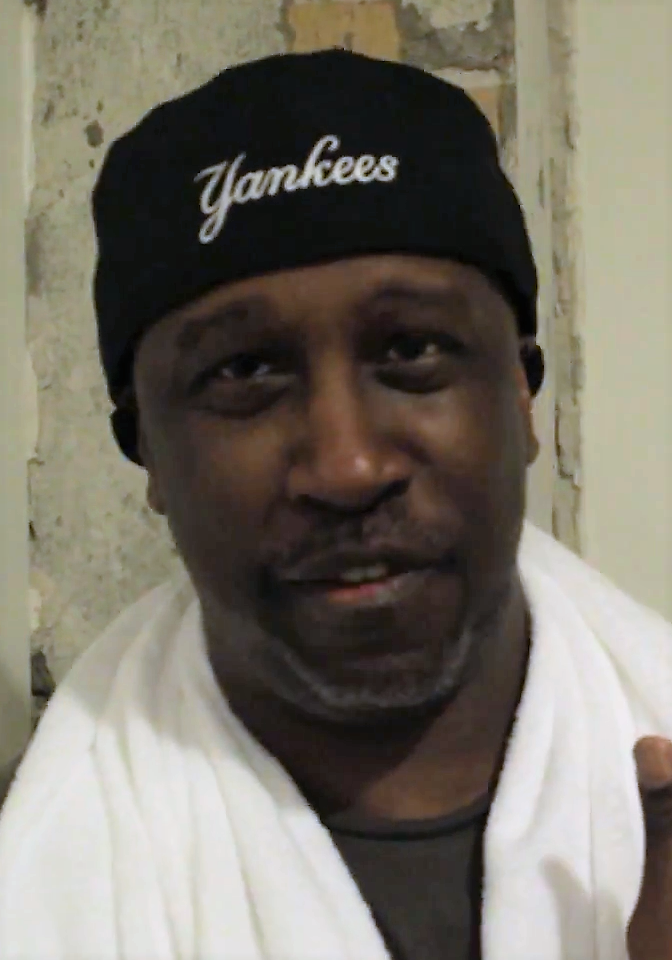
The moniker was loaned to Todd Terry (pictured) for his 1987 singles, edited by Mike Delgado, and Franklin Martinez.

In the late 1980s, Kenny "Dope" Gonzalez organized a series of block parties with his friend Mike Delgado under the name Masters at Work. Gonzalez loaned the name to Todd Terry for his 1987 singles "Alright Alright" and "Dum Dum Cry", with editing by Mike Delgado and Franklin Martinez. Terry had attended Gonzalez's parties and became influential to him. When Vega was hired to mix one of Terry's freestyles, this eventually led him to meeting Gonzalez. Gonzalez and Vega started using the name Masters at Work in 1990.

In 1993, the duo also created the Nuyorican Soul moniker, blending their residence in New York City, Puerto Rican heritage, and affinity for soul music. Their Nuyorican Soul project had the duo working extensively with real (as opposed to sampled or synthesized) musicians, in a variety of styles including Latin, disco, jazz, and more. Musicians who took part in this project included Vincent Montana Jr., Roy Ayers, George Benson, Jocelyn Brown, Tito Puente, and members of the Salsoul Orchestra.

The self-titled album released under the name Nuyorican Soul in 1996 included original tracks as well as cover versions of songs by the performers with which the duo was working, such as "Sweet Tears" (Roy Ayers), and "Runaway", originally sung by Loleatta Holloway with the Salsoul Orchestra, here sung by India and featuring musicians from the original 1977 recording.

They have been nominated three times for the Grammy Award for Best Remixed Recording, Non-Classical.

In 2021, they relaunched MAW Records, with their first new track release in 20 years.

== Legacy ==
Remixing of its tracks by UK DJs in the 1990s helped to create the speed garage genre. The duo has been credited with generating the "Golden Age" of Latin house. Resident Advisor referred to the duo as potentially "the most influential pairing in the history of house".

MAW has a history as remixers, having reproduced tracks for various acts both inside and outside the world of dance music. Artists remixed by the two producers include Michael Jackson, Janet Jackson, Madonna, Donna Summer, Aaliyah, Gus Gus, Jody Watley, Jamiroquai, Earth Wind & Fire, Stephanie Mills, Spice Girls, Daft Punk and Los Amigos Invisibles.

The duo’s 1991 single "The Ha Dance" became highly influential in the Black and Latino LGBT ballroom scene and vogue, the dance style created in the scene. The beat has been sampled and remixed so many times that it has become almost synonymous with ballroom music. The song's "Ha" on the four-beat "intertwines with vogue's ‘dip’ element of basically falling to the ground in a dramatic or soft way."

== DJ Magazine top 100 DJs list ==
Year	Position	Notes	Ref.
1997	15	New entry	
1998	14	Up 1	
1999	12	Up 2	
2000	23	Down 11	
2001	34	Down 11	
2002	34	No change	
2003	38	Down 4	
