= Soy Diferente =

Studio album by La India
- Released: January 31, 2006
- Genre: Salsa, reggaeton
- Language: Spanish

La India chronology
Latin Songbird: Mi Alma Y Corazón (2002)	Soy Diferente (2006)	Unica (2010)

Singles from Soy Diferente
- 1. "Soy Diferente"; 2. "Solamente Una Noche"; 3. "Lagrimas"

Professional ratings
Review scores
Source	Rating
Allmusic	3.5/5 stars

Soy Diferente (I'm Different) is India's eighth studio album released in February 2006, under record label SGZ Entertainment/Univision Music Group. Under the production of Sergio George and Isidro Infante, India sets herself as composer of all of the songs. On the album, she collaborates with Cheka, Ivy Queen, Tito Nieves and her mother, in the song "Madre e Hija" ("Mother and Daughter").

== Track listing ==
Standard edition
No.	Title	Length
1.	"Soy Diferente" (Salsaton Version) (featuring Cheka)	03:38
2.	"Solamente Una Noche" (Salsa Version)	04:17
3.	"Un Amor Obsesivo"	04:37
4.	"Cuando Hieres A Una Mujer" (featuring Ivy Queen)	03:53
5.	"No Es Lo Mismo" (featuring Tito Nieves)	04:14
6.	"Lágrimas"	04:14
7.	"Tengo Que Dejarte Ir"	04:40
8.	"Soy Diferente" (Reggaeton Version) (featuring Cheka)	03:33
9.	"Madre E Hija" (Featuring Gloria Viera)	04:01
10.	"Solamente Una Noche" (Reggaeton Version)	03:38
11.	"Bugarrón"	03:20
Total length:		43:54

== Personnel ==
- India – vocals, coros
- Cheka – vocals
- Ivy Queen – vocals
- Tito Nieves – vocals
- Raul Agraz – trumpet
- Alberto Barros – trombone
- Sal Cuevas – bass
- Jorge Diaz – trombone
- Joe Fiedler – trombone
- Gaitan Bros. – keyboards, piano
- Sergio George – keyboards, piano
- Douglas Guevara – bongos, congas, güiro
- Isidro Infante – keyboards, piano
- Nelson "Gasu" Jaime – trumpet
- Marco Linares – acoustic guitar
- Juan Diego Gallego Lopez – bongos, congas
- Angel "Angie" Machado – trumpet
- Diomedes Matos – bass
- Ozzie Melendez – trombone
- Pedro Perez – bass
- Marc Quinones – bongos, congas, timbales
- Jesus "El Traviezo" Quintero – percussion
- Ruben Rodriguez – bass
- Pablo Santaelia – trombone
- Bernd Schoenhart – acoustic guitar
- Johnny Torres – bass
- Dante Vargas – trumpet
- Robert Vilera – percussion, timbales
- Hector "Wichy" Camacho, Darvel Garcia, Joseph Julian Gonzalez, Nelson Gonzalez, Angel Rosario, Gaitan Bros. – coros

== Production ==
- Producers – Emilio Estefan Jr., Sergio George, Isidro Infante, Rafael Pina
- Engineers – Guido Diaz, Alberto Gaitan, Tony Mardini, Israel "PT" Najera, Rafael Pina, Hector Ivan Rosa, Jake R. Tanner
- Assistant engineers – Jaron Bozeman, Darrell Noonan, Hector Ruben Rivera, Pablo Sanchez
- Arrangers – Emilio Estefan Jr., Gaitan Bros., Sergio George, Isidro Infante, Herman "Teddy" Mulet, Franz Diubell Ortega
- Drum programming – Sergio George, Franz Diubell Ortega
- Mastering – Jose Blanco
- Mixing – Guido Diaz, Emilio Estefan Jr., Isidro Infante, Tony Mardini, Hector Ruben Rivera
- Production coordination – LaTisha Cotto, Leyla Leeming, Jose Juan Maldonado, Rafael Pina, Hector Ruben Rivera, Mike Rivera
- Studio coordinator – Billie Pechenik
- Vocal producer – Isidro Infante

== Chart performance ==
Year	Chart	Peak
2006	Billboard Latin Tropical Albums	1
2006	Billboard Top Latin Albums	11
2006	Billboard Top Heatseekers	9
2006	Billboard Top Tropical Albums	1

== Sales and certifications ==
Region	Certification	Certified units/sales
United States (RIAA)	Gold (Latin)	50,000^{^}
^{^} Shipments figures based on certification alone.

== See also ==
- List of number-one Billboard Tropical Albums from the 2000s
