= Cher Ng =

Singaporean DJ

- Born: Ng Cher Yong; 22 January 1972 (age 54); Singapore
- Occupations: Developer, Entrepreneur
- Years active: 1991–present
- Children: 1

Chinese name
- Traditional Chinese: 黃子榮
- Simplified Chinese: 黃子荣
Transcriptions
Standard Mandarin
- Hanyu Pinyin: Huáng Zǐróng
- Musical career
- Also known as: DJ Cher, CNG
- Origin: Singapore
- Genres: Electronic, Techno, Trance
- Label: React Music

Ng Cher Yong (born 1972), known professionally as Cher Ng, was a Singaporean DJ under the moniker DJ Cher. He is the co-founder and managing director of Zouk Kuala Lumpur, and co-founder and property developer of TREC – Malaysia and Kuala Lumpur's largest entertainment and F&B enclave.

== Early life ==
Ng was born in Singapore in 1972. He attended Pei Tong Primary School and Fairfield Methodist School (Secondary). He was 15 when he started working on weekends as a roadie, loading and unloading equipment for a mobile disco outfit. After his O levels, he entered Singapore Polytechnic to study Electrical and Electronics Engineering. But he dropped out to cut his teeth on the deejay circuit working for a couple of companies and spinning at various clubs before he was signed up by The Music Force.

== Career ==
=== 1991–1996: Career beginnings ===
Ng began his foray into the electronic music scene as one of Zouk Singapore earliest resident DJs upon meeting entrepreneur and art collector Lincoln Cheng [who later became his mentor] at the former Warehouse disco in Singapore. Cheng, who is the owner of Zouk Singapore, offered him a full-time job at the club. Ng was part of Singapore’s first electronic dance music group, Transcendental Experience along with two fellow locals Jason Tan and Shawn Chin of the dance-pop group Club Ecstasy. In September 1996, Transcendental Experience got signed to British label React Music, and their music was released in Europe.

=== 1997-2003: Music Festivals ===
Ng left Zouk Singapore several years later in 1997 to become one of the earliest electronic dance music festival promoter, organising a string of successful electronic music gigs in Singapore and Kuala Lumpur, Malaysia, featuring many internationally renowned DJs and music acts like Deep Dish, John Digweed, Incognito and Paul Van Dyk.

He also co-organised the first ever ZoukOut with Zouk Singapore in 2000 and 2001, which remains to be one of Asia's biggest music dance festivals.

=== 2004-2010: Establishment of Zouk Kuala Lumpur ===
In 2004, Ng launched Zouk Kuala Lumpur, the sister club to Zouk Singapore. However, the initial years were met with many obstacles, and Zouk KL underwent a major revamp in 2008, dividing its existing rooms into 7 rooms catering to the growing demographic.

The revamp paid off; Zouk KL went on to clinch many media accolades for Best Club, including the prestigious Kuala Lumpur Mayor’s Tourism Awards (Nightspot Category).

Zouk KL later earned endorsement from the Ministry of Tourism & Culture as a National Key Economic Area – the first for an entertainment venue.

=== 2012-2014: @LiveKL ===
Cher also created @live KL, a multisensory entertainment concept that married high energy cabaret shows featuring a 22 piece band with F&B in a club environment. The concept took the scene by storm and spanned two very successful outlets in Sunway, Petaling Jaya and Kuala Lumpur city centre.

=== 2015-2020: Zouk KL & TREC ===
In the second quarter of 2015, Zouk KL relocated to TREC (Taste.Relish.Experience.Celebrate, of which he is also the co-founder), an entertainment and lifestyle precinct located in Jalan Tun Razak, Kuala Lumpur, Malaysia.

The new reiteration of Zouk KL consisted of 11 rooms and was considered the largest super club in Asia with a capacity of over 5000 clubbers. Zouk KL, which until 2020 saw half a million clubbers a year, was awarded a position as high as Top 13 in The World’s Best Clubs according to the DJ Mag Best Club Awards as well as simultaneously being the 3rd best club in Asia.

During this time, Cher also launched two new projects situated within the TREC development. Firstly, in 2017, was YG Republique, a Korean grill restaurant, k-wave bar and one of the trendiest hangouts in town in partnership with YG Entertainment.

Cher also founded and launched Iron Fairies KL which is to date one of the most expensive bars built in KL, is a partnership with interior designer Ashley Sutton. The outlet had a footprint of 10,000 square feet, the biggest Iron Fairies bar to date as well as a second area called the Butterfly room which featured, 50,000 metal butterflies mounted from the ceiling

TREC is Malaysia's first and largest purpose-built entertainment and lifestyle destination. It comprises five zones that houses bars, restaurants, eateries and cafes with over 30 F&B and entertainment brands. Cher successfully led the TREC team to be designated a Malaysia National Key Economic Area project under the EPP 8 programme.

In 2016, Ng was awarded the prestigious HAPA Icon of the Year award for his work at Zouk, which also clinched The BrandLaureate Award – the first for a club brand as a recipient.

=== 2020-Present ===
In 2020 just before the global pandemic hit the industry, Cher exited Zouk KL. He remains as a partner in TREC KL. He is currently based in both Singapore and Kuala Lumpur, concentrating on developing new future forward concepts within the F&B scene.
