= Louie Vega Starring...XXVIII =

Studio album by Louie Vega
- Released: February 26, 2016
- Label: Vega Records

Louie Vega Starring...XXVIII is an album by Louie Vega, released on February 26, 2016 by Vega Records. The album earned Vega a Grammy Award nomination for Best Dance/Electronic Album.

== Track listing ==
1. "Aint That Funkin Kinda Hard on You?"
2. "Dance"
3. "Elevator (Going Up)"
4. "Angels Are Watching Me"
5. "A New Day" (featuring Caron Wheeler)
6. "Magical Ride (Wave of Love)" (featuring N'Dea Davenport)
7. "Gift of Love"
8. "Heaven Knows" (featuring Anane Vega)
9. "Can We Keep This Going"
10. "Gimme Some Love"
11. "Just the Way I Like It"
12. "See Some Light"
13. "I Deserve to Breathe"
14. "Let's Do It (Dance Ritual Mix)"
15. "You Are Everything"
16. "Together We Can"
17. "Joy Inside My Tears"
18. "Because We Love It"
19. "Turned Onto You" (featuring Lisa Fischer and Anane Vega)
20. "Do What You Gotta Do" (featuring Lisa Fischer)
21. "Stop On By" (featuring Lisa Fischer)
22. "Slick City" (featuring Lisa Fischer)
23. "You've Got It Bad Girl"
24. "In the Morning"
25. "Been Such a Long Time Gone"
26. "Es Vedra"
27. "Everlasting Love"
28. "Ain't No Stoppin' Love"
