= Unica (La India album) =

Studio album by La India
- Released: June 1, 2010
- Genre: Salsa, tropical music, Latin music
- Language: Spanish
- Label: Top Stop Music
- Producer: Sergio George

La India chronology
Soy Diferente (2006)	Unica (2010)	Intensamente Con Canciones de Juan Gabriel (2015)

Singles from Unica
- 1. "Estupida (Salsa Version)" Released: February 23, 2010; 2. "Estupida (Ballad Version)" Released: May 25, 2010; 3. "Si El Te Habla De Mi" Released: 2010

Unica ("unique") is the ninth studio album by Puerto Rican singer La India, released on June 1, 2010, on the Top Stop Music label founded by grammy winner Sergio George. It features the song Estupida, which was released as a single in both ballad and salsa versions, and was her 7th #1 hit on the Tropical Billboard Charts, making her the female with the most #1 hits on the chart. The album's release party was held in San Juan, Puerto Rico.

== Album information ==
Unica is the first album since Soy Diferente in 2006 to be released by La India. Unica is also the second album to be produced by George under his newly independent record label, Top Stop Music. George has worked with India since her 2nd album Dicen Que Soy during the RMM years. The first single, Estupida, was released on February 23, 2010, and reached #1 on Latin Tropical Airplay. The album also includes two covers such as Smile and Crying.

== Track listing ==
No.	Title	Writer(s)	Length
1.	"Smile"	Charlie Chaplin, Geoffrey Parsons	04:23
2.	"Estupida (Salsa Version)"	Diego Calvetti, Federica Camba, Daniele Coro, Santiago Larramendi	04:22
3.	"Si El Te Habla De Mi"	Alejandro Jaén, William Paz	04:07
4.	"Te Vas A Arrepentir"	Jorge Luís Piloto, Marlow Rosado	03:51
5.	"Turn Off The Lights"	Kenneth Gamble, Leon Huff	04:05
6.	"Si Estoy Loca"	Gemma Gallardo, Pablo Pinilla, David Santisteban	03:59
7.	"Crying"	Joe Melson, Roy Orbison	04:24
8.	"Ni Fines De Semana Ni Días Festivos"	Alvaro Torres	04:19
9.	"Amor Secreto"	Linda Caballero, Sergio George, Luis Rafael Vazquez	04:35
10.	"Triste"	Linda Caballero, Santiago Larramendi, Carlos Ojeda, Jr.	04:04
11.	"Estupida (Ballad Version)"	Diego Calvetti, Federica Camba, Daniele Coro, Santiago Larramendi	03:25
Total length:			45:42

== Reception ==
Professional ratings
Review scores
Source	Rating
Allmusic	4/5 stars

David Jeffries of Allmusic gave the album a positive review calling her voice "rich with emotion". He called the single "Estupida" a "towering highlight" and commented that "bittersweet is the album’s overriding emotion".

== Awards and recognitions ==
- The 2010 album was nominated for a Latin Grammy for best tropical salsa album. India was the only female artist to be nominated in this category because of problems with Univision she did not even attend the awards ceremony.
- The album's lead single, Estupida, was nominated for song of the year for the "Premio Lo Nuestro" awards.
- The album's quality and success has gotten India a nomination in the "Premio Lo Nuestro" awards for the female tropical artist of the year.

== Chart performance ==
The album sold over 3,000 copies in its first week. On the Tropical Albums chart, Unica debuted at number one. The album had succeeded Aventura's album The Last which was number one for 24 consecutive weeks. Unica was succeeded by Juan Luis Guerra's album Asondeguerra, a week later. On the Top Latin Albums chart, the album debuted and peaked at number four. The album gave India her third number-one entry on the Tropical Albums chart, and fifth overall number one album on the chart, passing Gloria Estefan for the most number-one albums by female artist on the chart.

Chart (2010)	Peak position
U.S. Billboard 200	180
U.S. Billboard Top Latin Albums	4
U.S. Billboard Tropical Albums	1
