= Nuyorican Soul =

American music group

- Origin: New York City, New York
- Genres: Salsa; Latin; soul; house; jazz
- Years active: 1993–present
- Labels: Nervous; Talkin' Loud
- Members: Little Louie Vega; Kenny "Dope" Gonzalez

Nuyorican Soul is an American music group from New York City, New York. It was formed by Little Louie Vega and Kenny "Dope" Gonzalez, as a "loose collective of salsa, soul, and dance music artists".

In 1996, the group released "Runaway". The single reached number one on the Billboard Dance Club Songs chart and the UK Dance Singles Chart. In 1997, the group released a studio album, Nuyorican Soul. It featured guest appearances from George Benson, Roy Ayers, Tito Puente, DJ Jazzy Jeff, Jocelyn Brown, Vincent Montana Jr., Salsoul Orchestra, and India. It peaked at number 25 on the UK Albums Chart. A 2006 reissue version of the album includes an additional bonus disc.

== Discography ==
Studio albums

- Nuyorican Soul (1997)

Compilation albums

- The Remixes (1998)

Singles

- "The Nervous Track" (1993)
- "Mind Fluid" (1996)
- "Runaway" (1996) (with India)
- "You Can Do It (Baby)" (1996) (with George Benson)
- "It's Alright, I Feel It!" (1997) (with Jocelyn Brown)
- "I Am the Black Gold of the Sun" (1997) (with Jocelyn Brown)
- "I Love the Nightlife (Disco 'Round)" (1998) (with India)
