= Gunman (187 Lockdown song) =

Single by 187 Lockdown

from the album 187
- Released: 3 November 1997
- Recorded: 1997
- Genre: Speed garage
- Label: EastWest
- Songwriter(s): Danny Harrison, Julian Jonah
- Producer(s): Danny Harrison, Julian Jonah

187 Lockdown singles chronology
"Gunman" (1997)	"Kung-Fu" (1998)

"Gunman" is the debut single by English speed garage duo 187 Lockdown. The song was released twice, first in November 1997 where it reached No. 16 on the UK Singles Chart and No. 1 on the UK Dance Chart, then again the following year, peaking one place lower at No. 17.

The song contains samples of Ennio Morricone's "Carillon (Watch chimes)" (from the film For a Few Dollars More), and a vocal sample from Dr Alimantado's "Gimmie Mi Gun".

== Impact and legacy ==
In 1999, Tom Ewing of Freaky Trigger ranked the song at number 84 in his list of the "Top 100 Singles of the 90s", saying "'Gunman' is crude, undeniable stuff, formulaic as hell but a formula that felt – feels – fresh, exciting and accessible."

The Guardian listed "Gunman" at number 8 in their list of "The best UK garage tracks - ranked!" in 2019.

Mixmag included the song in their list of "The 15 Best Speed Garage Records Released in '97 and '98".

Redbull.com included the song in their list of "10 underground UK garage classics that still sound fresh today".

== Track listing ==
UK CD single

1. "Gunman" (Pointed Radio Edit) (3:07)
2. "Gunman" (Nu-Birth's Gun Groove Dub) (6:30)
3. "Gunman" (Original Mix) (6:19)
4. "Gunman" (Natural Born Chillers Remix) (7:12)
5. "Gunman" (Blunt Edit) (3:31)

== Charts ==
Chart (1997)	Peak position
Scotland (OCC)	51
UK Singles (OCC)	16
UK Dance (Official Charts Company)	1
Chart (1998)	Peak position
Scotland (OCC)	41
UK Singles (OCC)	17
