= Anytime (Nu-Birth song) =

Single by Nu-Birth
- Released: 1996/1997
- Genre: UK garage, house
- Length: 6:25
- Label: XL Recordings, Locked On
- Songwriter(s): Danny Harrison, Julian Jonah
- Producer(s): Danny Harrison, Julian Jonah

Nu-Birth singles chronology
"Anytime" (1996)	"Can't Stop" (1999)

"Anytime" is a song by Nu-Birth, an alias of UK garage duo 187 Lockdown. The song features Janette Sewell on vocals. It was first released in 1996 on Nu Jak Recordings then as an official single in 1997 via XL Recordings/Locked On, reaching No. 48 on the UK Singles Chart. A re-release the following year featuring new mixes peaked seven places higher at No. 41. The 1997 release also reached No. 1 on the UK Dance Singles Chart.

The song samples Julian Jonah's Funky Love Dub mix of Richard Darbyshire's "Wherever Love Is Found", as well as vocals from Impromp2's "Get Me Off".

Mixmag included "Anytime" in their list of the "12 best late-90s UK garage records".

Redbull.com included the song in their "Honorable mentions" list of "underground UK garage classics that still sound fresh today".

== Track listing ==
UK 12" (1997)
A1. "Anytime" (Nu-Vocal Mix) - 6:25
A2. "Anytime" (Tuff & Jam's Kick Dub) - 6:24
B1. "Anytime" (Gant Mix) - 6:30
B2. "Anytime" (Original Mix) - 6:25

UK 12" (1998)
A1. "Anytime" (Rhythm Masters Mix) - 7:10
A2. "Anytime" (Dem 2 Nice 'N' Sleazy Mix) - 6:22
B1. "Anytime" (Tuff & Jam's Kick Dub) - 6:50
B2. "Anytime" (Original Mix) - 6:25

== Charts ==
Chart (1997)	Peak position
UK Singles (OCC)	48
UK Dance (Official Charts Company)	1

Chart (1998)	Peak position
UK Singles (Official Charts Company)	41
