= 187 Lockdown =

British musical duo

- Origin: United Kingdom
- Genres: UK garage, speed garage, house (other aliases)
- Years active: 1996–1998
- Labels: EastWest
- Members: Danny Harrison; Julian Jonah

187 Lockdown was a British speed garage act, comprising Danny Harrison and Julian Jonah. The duo produced one album, with four singles released from it, and remixed many songs from 1996 until they parted ways in 1998.

The duo also recorded under a number of other aliases, such as Gant, Ground Control, Nu-Birth and M Factor. Of these, M Factor was the most commercially successful, notching up a UK top 20 hit with the vocal version of "Mother".

After M Factor, Harrison went on to become part of the remix outfit Moto Blanco. Jonah still continues to work as a producer.

== Discography ==
=== Albums ===
- 1998: 187

=== Singles ===
Year	Title	Peak chart positions					Album
Year	Title	UK	UK Dance	NED	SCO	US Club	Album
1997	"Gunman"	16	1	—	51	—	187
1998	"Kung-Fu"	9	1	60	21	48	187
1998	"Gunman" (re-release)	17	3	—	41	8	187
1998	"The Don"	29	10	—	55	—	187
1999	"All 'n' All" (featuring D'Empress)	43	8	—	—	—	187
"—" denotes items that did not chart or were not released in that territory.

==== As Nu-Birth ====
- "Anytime" (1997) – UK #48, UK Dance #1
- "Anytime" (rerelease) (1998) – UK #41

==== As Gant ====
- "Sound Bwoy Burial"/"All Night Long" (1997) – UK #67

==== As M Factor ====
- "Mother" (2002) – UK #18
- "Come Together" (2003) – UK #46

== See also ==
- Speed garage
