= Turntables on the Hudson =

American electronic music event series and record label

- Official Logo
- Founded: 1998
- Founder: Nickodemus; Nappy G; Mariano
- Status: Active
- Genre: Worldbeat; Afrobeat; House music; Downtempo
- Country of origin: United States
- Location: New York City, New York

Turntables on the Hudson is a New York based underground music festival that has also transformed into a global event and record label since its foundation in 1998.

== History ==
Turntables on the Hudson started as a series of music parties near the Hudson River in New York City in 1998 founded by DJ Nickodemus, DJ Mariano and percussionist Nappy G.

The event later expanded internationally and became a global record label.

In 2008, a 10 year anniversary compilation album was released featuring 10 popular tracks played at the festival.

Similarly, in 2018, a 20 year anniversary compilation album was released featuring another 20 popular tracks from the event.

== Notable events ==
The group later performed internationally on multiple occasions such as the "Turntables on the Nile" event in Cairo, Egypt, the "Turntables on the Caribbean" event in the Candela Arts and Music Festival at Old San Juan, Puerto Rico. and the "Turntables on las Ramblas" in Barcelona, Spain.

== Releases ==
The brand has issued several compilation albums documenting its musical history:

- Turntables on the Hudson Volume 1 (1999)
- Turntables on the Hudson Volume 2 (2002)
- Turntables on the Hudson Volume 3 (2003)
- Turntables on the Hudson Volume 4 (2004)
- Turntables on the Hudson 10 Year Anniversary (2008)
- Turntables on the Hudson Vol. 8: Reflecting Cielo (2012)
- Turntables on the Hudson 20 Year Anniversary (2018)

== In popular media ==
Songs from Turntables on the Hudson are featured in the form of an eponymous in-game radio station in the PlayStation Portable and mobile versions of the 2009 video game Grand Theft Auto: Chinatown Wars.
