= List of UK R&B Albums Chart number ones of 1997 =

The logo of the Official Charts Company, responsible for compiling all of the official music charts in the United Kingdom, including the R&B albums chart.

The UK R&B Chart is a weekly chart, first introduced in October 1994, that ranks the 40 biggest-selling singles and albums that are classified in the R&B genre in the United Kingdom. The chart is compiled by the Official Charts Company, and is based on sales of CDs, downloads, vinyl and other formats over the previous seven days.

The following are the number-one albums of 1997.

== Number-one albums ==
Issue date	Album	Artist(s)	Record label	Ref.
5 January	Travelling Without Moving	Jamiroquai	Sony Soho Square	
12 January	Travelling Without Moving	Jamiroquai	Sony Soho Square	
19 January	Travelling Without Moving	Jamiroquai	Sony Soho Square	
26 January	Travelling Without Moving	Jamiroquai	Sony Soho Square	
2 February	Travelling Without Moving	Jamiroquai	Sony Soho Square	
9 February	The Soul Album	Various Artists	Virgin	
16 February	The Soul Album	Various Artists	Virgin	
23 February	Ocean Drive	Lighthouse Family	Wildcard/Polydor	
2 March	Ocean Drive	Lighthouse Family	Wildcard/Polydor	
9 March	Ocean Drive	Lighthouse Family	Wildcard/Polydor	
16 March	Ocean Drive	Lighthouse Family	Wildcard/Polydor	
23 March	Before the Rain	Eternal	EMI	
30 March	Lisa Stansfield	Lisa Stansfield	Arista	
6 April	Lisa Stansfield	Lisa Stansfield	Arista	
13 April	Baduizm	Erykah Badu	Kedar/Universal	
20 April	Share My World	Mary J. Blige	MCA	
27 April	Shelter	Brand New Heavies	FFRR	
4 May	Sisters of Swing III	Various Artists	Polygram Tv/Global	
11 May	Sisters of Swing III	Various Artists	Polygram Tv/Global	
18 May	Travelling Without Moving	Jamiroquai	Sony Soho Square	
25 May	Travelling Without Moving	Jamiroquai	Sony Soho Square	
1 June	Before the Rain	Eternal	EMI	
8 June	Before the Rain	Eternal	EMI	
15 June	Before the Rain	Eternal	EMI	
22 June	EV3	En Vogue	East West	
29 June	Kiss 100FM - Smooth Grooves	Various Artists	Polygram TV	
6 July	Kiss 100FM - Smooth Grooves	Various Artists	Polygram TV	
13 July	Kiss 100FM - Smooth Grooves	Various Artists	Polygram TV	
20 July	Kiss 100FM - Smooth Grooves	Various Artists	Polygram TV	
27 July	No Way Out	Puff Daddy	Bad Boy	
3 August	Men in Black: The Album	Various Artists	Columbia/Sony	
10 August	Men in Black: The Album	Various Artists	Columbia/Sony	
17 August	Men in Black: The Album	Various Artists	Columbia/Sony	
24 August	Men in Black: The Album	Various Artists	Columbia/Sony	
31 August	Men in Black: The Album	Various Artists	Columbia/Sony	
7 September	Much Love	Shola Ama	Warner Music	
14 September	Butterfly	Mariah Carey	Columbia	
21 September	Butterfly	Mariah Carey	Columbia	
28 September	Butterfly	Mariah Carey	Columbia	
5 October	Butterfly	Mariah Carey	Columbia	
12 October	The Velvet Rope	Janet Jackson	Virgin	
19 October	Fresco	M People	M People	
26 October	Postcards from Heaven	Lighthouse Family	Wildcard/Polydor	
2 November	Greatest Hits	Eternal	EMI	
9 November	Greatest Hits	Eternal	EMI	
16 November	Greatest Hits	Eternal	EMI	
23 November	Greatest Hits	Eternal	EMI	
30 November	All Saints	All Saints	London/Island	
7 December	All Saints	All Saints	London/Island	
14 December	All Saints	All Saints	London/Island	
21 December	All Saints	All Saints	London/Island	
28 December	All Saints	All Saints	London/Island	

== See also ==
- List of UK Albums Chart number ones of 1997
