= Grand Theft Auto: Chinatown Wars =

2009 video game

- Developers: Rockstar Leeds; Rockstar North (Note: Ported to Android and Fire OS, as well as re-ported to iOS by War Drum Studios)
- Publisher: Rockstar Games
- Producers: Leslie Benzies; Gordon Hall
- Programmer: Al Dukes
- Artists: Ian Bowden; Dan Roberts
- Writers: Dan Houser; David Bland
- Series: Grand Theft Auto
- Platforms: Nintendo DS; PlayStation Portable iOS; Android; Fire OS
- Release: 17 March 2009: Nintendo DS; NA: 17 March 2009; AU: 19 March 2009; EU: 20 March 2009 PlayStation Portable; NA: 20 October 2009; EU: 23 October 2009; AU: 28 October 2009 iOS; WW: 17 January 2010 Android, Fire OS; WW: 18 December 2014
- Genre: Action-adventure
- Modes: Single-player, multiplayer (Note: Nintendo DS and PlayStation Portable versions only)

Grand Theft Auto: Chinatown Wars is a 2009 action-adventure game developed by Rockstar Leeds in conjunction with Rockstar North and published by Rockstar Games. The game was released for the Nintendo DS in March 2009, PlayStation Portable in October 2009, iOS in January 2010, and Android and Fire OS devices in December 2014. It is the thirteenth game in the Grand Theft Auto series and a follow-up to Grand Theft Auto IV, and is the first entry to be released for handheld consoles since 2006's Vice City Stories. Set within modern-day Liberty City (a fictional satire of New York City), the single-player story follows young Triad member Huang Lee and his efforts to recover a sword gifted by his late father after it is stolen from him, while inadvertently becoming caught in a power struggle amongst Liberty City's Triads.

The game was fundamentally designed for players to have notable interactions with objects on the DS and smartphone systems via their touch-screen controls, while offering unique elements of gameplay not found in other entries within the Grand Theft Auto series. The most notable element, the ability to buy drugs from suppliers and sell them to dealers to make money, proved controversial following the game's release. Despite this, the game received critical acclaim.

== Gameplay ==
A Cognoscenti being stolen, while the player holds a 3-star wanted level. While in other Grand Theft Auto titles, the main technique to evade from the police was to leave a certain vicinity, away from them entirely, Chinatown Wars introduces a new mechanic which requires the player to destroy a specific number of police vehicles, thereby lowering the wanted level.

Grand Theft Auto: Chinatown Wars is an action-adventure game set in an open world environment. It has a different presentation from previous games in the series, by partially resembling the first Grand Theft Auto titles. Instead of a ground-level view behind the protagonist or a top-down perspective, Chinatown Wars uses a fully rotatable camera angled down at the action. Chinatown Wars also uses cel-shaded polygons with black outlines to produce a comic book-like aesthetic—a first for the series. The title takes place in a scaled-down rendition of Grand Theft Auto IV's Liberty City, with the exception of Alderney.

Unlike Grand Theft Auto IV, the player can lose wanted stars by destroying police cars to escape the police instead of leaving a "wanted zone". The more stars the player has, the more police they have to take out for each level. For example, for a six star level, they have to take out six police cars to get down to a five star wanted level and so on. There is also a drug dealing sub plot which allows players to peddle heroin, acid, ecstasy, marijuana, cocaine and depressants around the city. Players can make a profit by recognising market conditions and demands based on geography and plying their wares accordingly. CCTV cameras work as this game's secret packages, destroyed by throwing a Molotov cocktail bottle or a grenade. This also decreases the chances of being caught while making a drug deal and provides discounts for buying drugs. Chinatown Wars applies many Grand Theft Auto IV features such as the next-gen HUD. Ammu-Nation returns in the form of an in-game website where the player can order various weapons through their PDA to be delivered to their safehouse. Players will also get emails which they can read either from the PDA or the laptop present in their safe house.

While stealing a moving vehicle is much similar to that of previous Grand Theft Auto games, Chinatown Wars uses a different system for stealing parked vehicles. Depending on the car, it can be started in one of a few ways. Older cars require a few turns of a screwdriver in the ignition, while other cars require hotwiring. Newer, more expensive cars (with the exception of a bulletproof van) require the player to "hack" the computerised immobiliser. It is still possible to flip cars or set them on fire. The player is unable to pilot any of the aircraft in the game, but can still see the ones at the airport or flying above him, although if a player uses a certain code on the Nintendo DS by using "Action Replay DS" the player can acquire a helicopter and fly it.

=== Platform differences ===
- The Nintendo DS version of the game takes advantage of the touchscreen with functions such as controlling the PDA, GPS, the radio, access to the people on the map, or using Molotov cocktails and grenades. The top screen shows the game and storyboard. Taxi whistling is supported by the DS microphone or by holding the X button. Competitive and co-operative multiplayer modes are only available through DS to DS local wireless.
- The PSP version features updated graphics, which are no longer cel-shaded, thus sporting a more "classic" look akin to previous games in the series (however, cutscenes are stylistically identical). Minigames (such as drawing tattoos, unscrewing the car and boom panels) have been adapted from their touch-screen functionality to simpler, QTE-like minigames. The PSP version also features extra missions and exclusive radio stations not found in the Nintendo DS version. However, PSP multiplayer supports only 2 players. There is an additional character named Melanie Mallard who is an independent news reporter working with one of the main characters of the game. Melanie and her missions are absent from other platforms.
- The iOS and Android versions of the game, based on the PSP version, includes on-screen touch controls and mini-games that have been adapted to work well with capacitive touchscreens. Both iOS and Android versions have the same radio stations as the PSP versions, though the iOS version features a custom radio station that uses the iTunes library.

== Plot ==
In 2009, Triad member Huang Lee travels to Liberty City to deliver the Yu Jian sword—a family heirloom won in a card game by his father, who was recently murdered in Kowloon—to his uncle Wu "Kenny" Lee. Upon arrival, Huang's escort is killed by unknown assailants, who steal the sword and leave Huang for dead. Surviving, he makes his way to Kenny's restaurant and informs his uncle of the theft. Kenny, outraged at the news, reveals that he intended to hand the sword to Hsin Jaoming, the elderly head of the Liberty City Triads, in order to secure his position as Hsin's successor. Feeling dishonored for losing Yu Jian, Kenny instructs Huang to assist in keeping his business afloat while he is in the city, causing him to be slowly drawn into the drug trade. While helping his uncle, Huang learns that two others are competing to become Hsin's successor—Hsin's sleazy son Chan Jaoming, and a ruthless underboss named Zhou Ming—and finds himself working for both men in addition to Kenny.

During a job, Huang is intercepted by Wade Heston, a corrupt LCPD detective under observation by internal affairs, who offers to help him find Yu Jian, believing that apprehending the thieves will clear his reputation and get internal affairs off his tail. Huang agrees and helps Heston investigate a Korean gang that is allied with the Triads, which the latter suspects to be behind the sword's theft. After bugging the Koreans' headquarters, the pair learn that there is a splinter group within the gang called the Wonsu Nodong, whose leader has been causing problems for the Triads with the help of an informant.

Meanwhile, Hsin contacts Huang for assistance, concerned about the news of an informant within his syndicate, and orders him to investigate two former Triad allies who Hsin is suspicious of—the Korean Midtown Gangsters, and an outlaw motorcycle club called the Angels of Death. Huang's investigation is briefly thrown off-course by a Triad-hating mafioso named Rudy D'Avanzo, who tricks him into believing the informant may be a member of the Messina crime family. Hsin eventually exposes Rudy's deception, leading to Huang killing him.

During this time, Huang assists Heston with several jobs for his Federal Investigation Bureau (FIB) contact, who offered to aid their investigation. However, Hsin soon becomes annoyed with Huang's progress and attempts to have him killed, suspecting Huang himself might be the informant. Kenny intervenes to save his nephew's life, and persuades Hsin to give Huang more time to find the actual informant. Eventually, with the aid of Lester Leroc, a private detective hired by Hsin, Huang discovers that both the Koreans and the Angels are innocent. Meanwhile, Heston is forced to quit the investigation due to pressure from internal affairs, though not before his FIB contact suggests hacking into the FIB servers to uncover the informant's identity.

After Huang retrieves several FIB files which name both Zhou and Chan as informants, he discusses his findings with Kenny, who convinces him to present the evidence to Hsin. Out of disgrace at the possibility of his son betraying the Triads, Hsin retires and names Kenny his successor. Meanwhile, Huang is tasked with killing Zhou and Chan, though both deny the accusations against them before dying. Heston later contacts Huang with news that the information he retrieved was fake and that the Wonsu leader is meeting with his allies. Spying on the meeting, Huang is shocked to discover Kenny is the Wonsu leader and orchestrated the theft of Yu Jian. As the LCPD and FIB ambush the meeting, Kenny makes his escape, but Huang and Heston pursue him to Hsin's penthouse.

Confronting his uncle, Huang learns that Hsin had ordered Kenny to retrieve Yu Jian in exchange for a position underneath Chan. Kenny killed Huang's father to inherit the sword, but later had Yu Jian stolen to keep himself from such a dishonorable position, and worked to undermine Hsin's leadership and take over, framing Zhou and Chan to cover his tracks. After Kenny stabs Hsin with Yu Jian, he is in turn killed by Huang, finally avenging his father. As the LCPD and FIB arrive on the scene, Heston assumes control of the situation, arrests Hsin, and lets Huang go. Before he is taken to the hospital, Hsin praises Huang's loyalty and offers to name him the next Triad leader, but Huang remains silent.

== Soundtrack ==
Music for the opening titles of gameplay is the track "Chinatown Wars" performed by Ghostface Killah and MF Doom and produced by Oh No of Stones Throw Records.

The DS version of the game features music by Deadmau5, Ticklah, The Alchemist, The Prairie Cartel and Truth and Soul Records in the form of eponymous in-game radio stations. On top of the soundtrack featured in the DS version of the game the PSP version features music by Anvil, Tortoise, DFA Records, Turntables on the Hudson and DJ Khalil.

The iOS and Android version featured all the music from the DS and PSP version and allowed the player to customise a music playlist using songs from their music library.

== Development ==
On 15 July 2008, at a Nintendo press conference, it was announced that Grand Theft Auto: Chinatown Wars would be released on the Nintendo DS in the following winter. The game contains over 900,000 lines of "hand-optimized" code.

== Release ==
=== Marketing ===
In the GameStop pre-order commercial for Grand Theft Auto: Chinatown Wars, the dialogue referred to the real-life corporate bailout in 2008. A new gameplay trailer was released on 6 March 2009, showing gameplay involving using a sniper rifle and interacting with keypads with the Nintendo DS' stylus. GameStop had a promotion where they sent around a van letting people try the game before it was released. Other stores gave away a "credit card" which activates $10,000 of in-game money and earlier access to better weapons. Amazon provided a code to unlock an exclusive bulletproof Infernus with preorders.

=== Reception ===
Reception

Aggregate score
Aggregator	Score
Metacritic	DS: 93/100; PSP: 90/100 iOS: 91/100

Review scores
Publication	Score
1Up.com	DS: A− PSP: A− iOS: A
Computer and Video Games	9.2/10
Edge	9/10
Eurogamer	10/10
Game Informer	9.25/10
GamePro	5/5
GameSpot	9.5/10
GameSpy	4.5/5
GamesRadar+	4.5/5
Giant Bomb	5/5
IGN	DS: 9.5/10; PSP: 9.3/10 iOS: 9.0/10
Nintendo World Report	9.0/10
Official Nintendo Magazine	94%
X-Play	5/5
TouchArcade	iOS: 5/5

==== Nintendo DS version ====
Grand Theft Auto: Chinatown Wars has received widespread critical acclaim. On GameRankings, it was the highest rated Nintendo DS game ever, with an average review score of 93%. The game holds a 93/100 aggregate score on Metacritic, which is the highest score on that site for a DS game. The game also has the highest rank for the Nintendo DS at GameSpot, with a rating of 9.5/10. Official Nintendo Magazine rated the game 94%, praising the visuals and variety in gameplay, concluding in their review that "Rockstar has captured and condensed the Grand Theft Auto series' high points and crammed them into one terrific title. Think the DS can't handle GTA? Think again." IGN UK gave it a rating of 9.2, calling it "a masterpiece of handheld gaming", while IGN US gave the game a 9.5 out of 10. Eurogamer gave it a rating of 10/10, saying "Overall this is GTA as it first was, with the inherited wisdom of GTA as it's been since, finished off with all sorts of things that would happily belong in a GTA of the future." 1UP.com gave it an A−, saying that "from the start, Chinatown Wars looks impressive".

Chinatown Wars generated lower than expected sales in its first week in the United Kingdom, selling fewer copies than the debut of Vice City Stories, which was Rockstar's expectation. In the United States, it sold just under 90,000 units during its first two weeks on the American market. This led Best Buy to sell the game at a reduced price for a limited time, the response to this was very positive.

==== PSP version ====
Rockstar confirmed via a press release that Grand Theft Auto: Chinatown Wars was going to be released for the PlayStation Portable on 20 October 2009. It was speculated that the PSP version would revert to the third person view. However, it retained the top down view from the DS version and also received acclaim. The game is available on UMD as well as via the PlayStation Network. 1UP.com gave the PSP version an A−, citing the experience is good the second time around and it is efficient for people who are playing for the first time. IGN gave the PSP version a 9.3/10, compared to the 9.5/10 on DS. The Indian website SKOAR! gave the version a 9/10, stating "the only complaint I have with the game is that it feels a bit too easy".

Unlike the DS version, which reached number 5, the PSP game didn't chart in the UK top 40 upon release, nor did it chart in the US monthly top 20.

==== iOS and Android versions ====
Chinatown Wars was released on iPhone and iPod Touch on 17 January 2010. The touchscreen minigame mechanics originally seen in the Nintendo DS version returned in a similar fashion. The graphics, when compared to the DS and PSP versions, aren't cel-shaded like the DS version and lack the ambient lighting and effects seen in the PSP version. An update released on 28 March 2010 added the radio stations that were formerly exclusive to the PSP version.

The iPad version was released on 9 September 2010, with 1024x768 high definition graphics. It received critical acclaim, with IGN's Levi Buchanan giving it a 9.0/10, calling it "a phenomenal play".

On 13 October 2013, Chinatown Wars was removed from the App Store with no statement given by Rockstar. It is believed that it was due to compatibility issues with iOS 7. On 21 December 2013, the game returned to the store with the compatibility issues fixed. An additional update was released on 18 December 2014 that provided support for Retina Display resolutions and wireless controller support.

Chinatown Wars made its debut on Android devices on 18 December 2014, featuring the same graphical improvements and features as the latest iOS update. The Android version was developed by War Drum Studios. Currently, both the iOS and Android versions contain no multiplayer or Social Club compatibility.

On 19 October 2023, the game was available for free with a 30-minute trial, with an option to login to Social Club and be able to play the full version if a GTA+ membership is subscribed on either PlayStation 5 or Xbox Series X/S.

=== Awards ===
At the 2009 Spike Video Game Awards, Grand Theft Auto: Chinatown Wars received the Best Handheld Game award. However, the version wasn't specified. It also won the Best Nintendo DS Game of 2009 Award from GameSpot. The game was nominated for three of GameSpot's awards: Game of the Year, DS Game of the Year and Action Game of the Year, winning DS Game of the Year. Chinatown Wars was nominated for Game of the Year by Nintendo Power, as well as Nintendo DS Game of the Year, Best Nintendo DS Graphics and Best Adventure Game. Pocket Gamer awarded the game Best Action/Arcade Game for handheld, Game of the Year for handheld and Overall Game of the Year in 2010.

== Controversy ==
Chinatown Wars continues the series' tradition of controversy because of a drug dealing minigame that involves the trade of drugs such as heroin and ecstasy. Protesters against the game include Darren Gold of the anti-drug abuse charity Drugsline, who stated: "Anything using drug-dealing as entertainment is sending out the wrong message. Glamorisation doesn't help our work trying to educate kids of the dangers of substance misuse." In an interview with Edge magazine, Dan Houser said "we wanted to have a drug-dealing mini-game in lots of the GTA games. [...] We played with it a little in Vice City Stories, because it worked really well juxtaposed with the main story. It works well with what GTA is, with driving around the map, and it gives you another thing to think about – another layer or piece of the puzzle to keep you motivated... It does intersect with the main story and things you learn from it work with the story, but it mostly runs on its own."
