= Mr. V =

American rapper

- Also known as: Mr. V
- Born: Victor Font; 1974 (age 51–52); Manhattan, New York, United States
- Origin: New York City
- Genres: House, club
- Occupations: DJ, Producer, Vocalist
- Years active: Since 2000
- Labels: Sole Channel Music; Muzik 4 Tomorrow
- Website: www.solechannelmusic.com

Victor Font (born 1974), known professionally as Mr. V, is an American disc jockey, record producer, and vocalist. Of Nuyorican origin, he grew up on the Lower East Side of Manhattan. Mr. V came to the attention of Louie Vega in the 1990s, working with him for some time, which had a significant influence on his music style which crosses hip hop and house.

Mr. V released his debut album, Welcome Home, in 2006 on Defected Records. It achieved a 3* review in The Skinny, and was called a "study in the melting pot of Manhattan sounds" by HX Magazine. Album track "Da Bump" peaked at number 2 on the UK Dance Chart in May 2007.

His 2013 release with Steve Bug, "The Long Run", received an 8/10 review in Mixmag, and in 2016 Mr. V collaborated with Roger Sanchez to release the "6 AM" extended player, which was called "big club ammo of the highest order", also by Mixmag.
