= Runaway (Nuyorican Soul song) =

Single by Nuyorican Soul

from the album Nuyorican Soul
- B-side: "Remix"
- Released: 1996
- Genre: Disco; pop (original); house; garage (remixes)
- Length: 4:19 (single version); 7:54 (album version)
- Label: Mercury Records; Talkin' Loud
- Songwriters: Janice Gugliuzza; Ronnie James; Vincent Montana Jr.
- Producers: "Little" Louie Vega; Kenny "Dope" Gonzalez

Nuyorican Soul singles chronology
"Runaway" (1996)	"It's Alright, I Feel It!" (1997)

Music video
- "Runaway" on YouTube

"Runaway" is a song by Nuyorican Soul, a project by the American house-garage production and remix team of "Little" Louie Vega and Kenny "Dope" Gonzalez. It features Puerto Rican singer and songwriter India and was released in 1996 by Mercury Records and Talkin' Loud as the first and lead single from their debut album, Nuyorican Soul (1997). The song is a cover of The Salsoul Orchestra's recording "Run Away", featuring American singer Loleatta Holloway from 1977. The new version was very successful in clubs and reached number-one on the Billboard Hot Dance Club Play chart in the US. In Europe, it peaked at number 24 on the UK Singles Chart, but was even more successful on the UK Dance Chart, where it hit number-one. Additionally, it was a top-30 hit in Iceland, and a top-40 hit in Germany. On the Eurochart Hot 100, the song reached number 75 in February 1997.

== Critical reception ==
Scottish Aberdeen Press and Journal complimented the song as "sensational". Barry Walters for The Advocate commented, "This retro-disco interpretation is so joyously reverent, it feels utterly contemporary. The song features refreshingly live strings conducted by the original Salsoul architect, Vince Montana, as well as an appropriately unfettered (and bilingual) vocal by the Latin siren India, the only vocalist to be revered in house, freestyle, and salsa circles." In a retrospective review, Patrick Corcoran from Albumism remarked that it "once again marries the carefree disco sound of the original with a respectful updating of production values." Daryl Easlea for BBC in 2011 wrote that taking the Salsoul Orchestra's 'Runaway' "again reflected the past projected into the future." He added, "A full hands-in the-air anthem, it brought a stately majesty to the original."

Larry Flick from Billboard stated that "as clubland continues to salivate for the onset of the full-length debut from Nuyorican Soul, the act offers this wonderfully faithful rendition of the Loleatta Holloway disco classic with fierce Latin/dance diva India in the vocal seat." Pan-European magazine Music & Media declared it as "a perfect drivetime record, with Kenny "Dope" Gonzalez and Louie Vega packing in every gramme of sunshine they've soaked up during years of fusing latino beats and New York club vibes. Soaring vocals from salsa diva India make this the most accessible track from their self titled album..." Alan Jones from Music Week wrote, "The new version is pleasingly retro, with India replicating Holloway's role with distinction. Radio is already on this one, too, and a hit is the only possible outcome." A reviewer from People Magazine noted that the current "queen of salsa", India, "tears into" the disco standard, while Judson Kilpatrick from Vibe deemed it an "soaring remake". David Sinclair from The Times complimented it as a "buoyant" debut.

== Music video ==
The accompanying music video for "Runaway" takes place in a cramped apartment where there is a house party. India performs the song amidst the crowd of dancing people. Interspersed with this, three different women's stories are being told; one comes home and finds her boyfriend with another woman; the second is tired of cleaning up after her lazy boyfriend; and the third has had enough of her boyfriend playing cards with the guys. Towards the end while India sings, all three women are packing their cases and running away from their boyfriends.

== Impact and legacy ==
American singer Janet Jackson once told MTV News that her inspiration to write her 1997 hit "Together Again" came from "Runaway" by Nuyorican Soul, as the song reminded her of being in Studio 54 in New York when she was a child. It gave Jackson a kind of New York feel of disco and she wanted to do something like this.

DJ Magazine ranked the song at number 51 in their list of "Top 100 Club Tunes" in 1998.

Disc Over Music main man and UK mainstay Tim Green said that "Runaway" was the first song he remember hearing, and liking, that could be classified as dance music.

Mixmag included the Armand Van Helden mix in their list of "The Best Basslines in Dance Music" in 2020, writing, "A legendary remix from a remix king. Armand Van Helden adds speed garage whizz and bass to Nuyorican Soul's sultry disco jam 'Runaway' with India. No longer a laidback cut for lazy days, AvH's remix is Strictly 4 Tha Clurb, powered by a zig-zag bassline with bundles of energy."

== Track listings ==
- 12", UK (1997)

A1. "Runaway" (original flava 12") – 9:55
A2. "Runaway" (Philly beats) – 2:38
B1. "Runaway" (Mongoloids in Space) – 11:35
B2. "Runaway" (Don't Sample This) (accapella) – 3:43

- 2 x Vinyl, 12", US (1997)

A1. "Runaway" (original flava 12" mix) – 9:55
A2. "Runaway" (Philly beats) – 2:38
B. "Runaway" (Mongoloids in Space) – 11:35
C1. "Runaway" (Mousse T's Jazz Funk Experience) – 8:19
C2. "Runaway" (Mousse T's Soul dub) – 5:46
D1. "Runaway" (Ronnie's Guitar instrumental) – 9:24
D2. "Runaway" (India's Ambient Dream) – 2:51
D3. "Runaway" (Don't Sample This!) (a cappella) – 3:43

- CD single, UK (1996)
1. "Runaway" – 4:14
2. "Runaway" (original flava 12") – 9:57
3. "Runaway" (Armand van Helden remix) – 10:36
- CD maxi, US (1997)
1. "Runaway" (radio edit) – 4:19
2. "Runaway" (original flava 12") – 12:30
3. "Runaway" (Mongoloids in Space) – 11:35
4. "Runaway" (Mousse T's Jazz Funk Experience) – 8:19
5. "Runaway" (radio edit with Spanish) – 4:18
6. "Runaway" (Spanish underground mix) – 7:50

== Charts ==
=== Weekly charts ===
Chart (1996–97)	Peak position
Canada Dance/Urban (RPM)	3
Europe (Eurochart Hot 100)	75
Germany (Official German Charts)	39
Iceland (Íslenski Listinn Topp 40)	24
Israel (Israeli Singles Chart)	18
Italy Airplay (Music & Media)	10
Scotland (OCC)	31
Switzerland (Schweizer Hitparade)	86
UK Singles (OCC)	24
UK Dance (OCC)	1
US Hot Dance Club Play (Billboard)	1
US Hot R&B Singles (Billboard)	77

=== Year-end charts ===
Chart (1997)	Position
Canada Dance/Urban (RPM)	40
UK Club Chart (Music Week)	40

== Cover versions and remixes ==
American DJ Armand van Helden and German DJ Mousse T. made remixes of "Runaway". The van Helden remix became a speed garage club hit.

British singer-songwriter Nate James covered "Runaway" on his 2009 album, Revival.

A Hundred Birds covered "Runaway" in 2016.

== See also ==
- List of number-one dance singles of 1997 (U.S.)
