= La India =

Puerto Rican singer (born 1969)

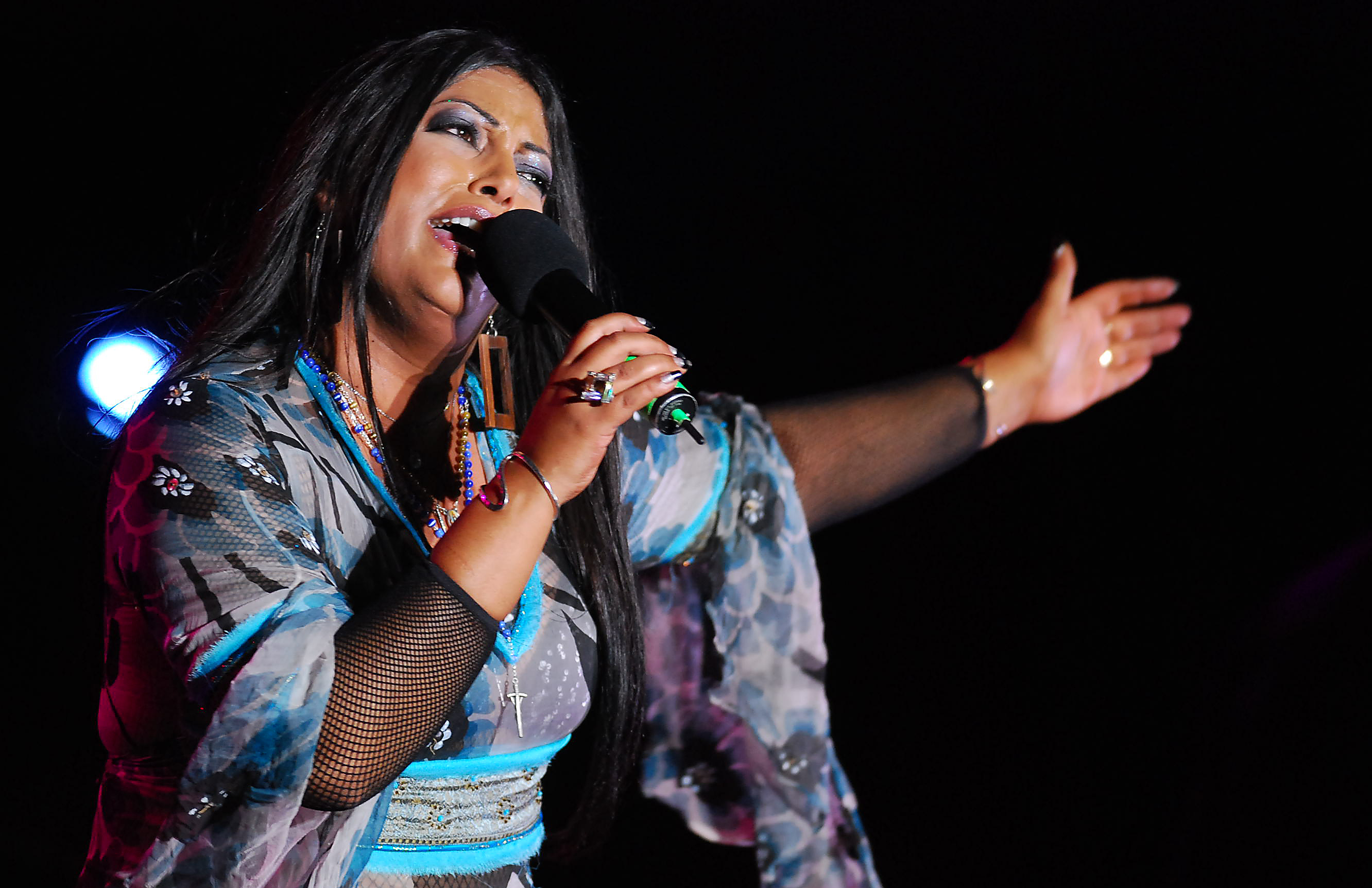
- La India performing at the Festival de la Salsa in Nicaragua in 2008

Background information
- Also known as: India
- Born: Linda Bell Viera Caballero; March 9, 1969 (age 57); Río Piedras, San Juan, Puerto Rico
- Genres: Latin freestyle; salsa; house; Latin pop
- Occupations: Singer; songwriter
- Instrument: Vocals
- Years active: 1985–present
- Labels: Reprise/Warner Bros.; RMM/MCA; Strictly Rhythm; Norte/Sony Latin; Top Stop (2010–present)
- Website: elmundodeindia.com

Linda Bell Viera Caballero (born March 9, 1969), known professionally as La India, is a Puerto Rican singer and songwriter of salsa, house music and Latin pop. La India has been nominated for both Grammy and Latin Grammy Awards, winning the Latin Grammy Award for Best Salsa Album for the Intensamente La India Con Canciones De Juan Gabriel album.

== Early life ==
Viera was born in Río Piedras, San Juan. Both her parents moved to New York City soon after her birth, settling in the South Bronx area of the city. Initially, they lived with Viera's grandmother, a woman who served as an important influence on Viera's life. Viera began singing as a young girl, even taking opera training for a brief time. Her stage name, La India, was given to her by her grandmother because of her dark features and long, straight, black hair. La India describes herself as a feminist, having witnessed domestic violence from her father.

== Career ==
=== 1985: Early career ===
In 1985, when Viera was 16 years old, she joined the Latin freestyle group TKA, a fact not widely known. Credited as "Linda," she appeared in the group photo on the back cover of TKA's second single, "Come Get My Love." She left shortly thereafter.

Viera signed a record contract with Reprise/Warner Bros. Records, which planned to market her as the Latin version of Madonna (who recorded for sister label Sire Records). India's debut album was titled Breaking Night. Three singles were released (“Dancing on the Fire,” “Right from the Start,” and “The Lover Who Rocks You All Night”), which all became big hits in the dance clubs. She also added her vocals to the Jellybean-produced single "Mirage". After recording the album, Viera decided that she didn't want to take that route in her career. She decided to switch to salsa because she believed that she needed to "cross over to [her] people."

=== 1992–1994: First salsa album ===
An important event took place when she accompanied her husband "Little" Louie Vega to a studio session. Salsa bandleader Eddie Palmieri happened to visit the studio, and was impressed with Caballero when he heard her singing. In 1992, Palmieri produced Caballero's first Spanish-language salsa album Llego La India via Eddie Palmieri (The India has Arrived via Eddie Palmieri), which was acclaimed as one of the best salsa albums of the year. From then on, Caballero became known to all as La India. India received a Lo Nuestro Award nomination in 1993 for Best Female Performer, Tropical/Salsa.

In 1994 La India, together with Louie Vega, recorded the house-music single "Love and Happiness (Yemaya y Ochún)," which paid tribute to Santería (a syncretic religion based in the Caribbean). This up-beat track was played heavily in dance clubs internationally. La India's involvement with Santería drew much criticism. Sergio George produced La India's 1994 album Dicen Que Soy, a 2× gold-certified Billboard hit that added to her legend in the Latin-American music realm. The album also included her cover of Cuba’s Adalberto Alvarez Y Su Son’s hit song "Vivir Lo Nuestro," featuring a duet with Marc Anthony. Later this same year, Combinación Perfecta was released.

=== 1996–present: La India, the Princess of Salsa ===
External audio
- You may listen to La India sing "Seduceme" here.
- You may listen to La India sing "Jazzin" with Tito Puente here

In 1996, La India worked with Tito Puente on Jazzin, an English-language album of swing classics with a Latin twist, on RMM Records. That same year she contributed the song "Banderas" to the album titled Voces Unidas (United Voices), a multi-artist tribute to the 1996 Summer Olympics. She also released India: Mega Mix that same year before divorcing Vega. La India sang a duet titled "La Voz de la Experiencia" (The Voice of Experience) with Celia Cruz, the late Queen of Salsa. It was then that Cruz gave Caballero her longer name: La India, the Princess of Salsa. In 1997, La India recorded "Sobre el Fuego" (Over the Fire) with Puerto Rican salsa singer Kevin Ceballo as backup vocalist. The song was nominated for Best Latin Tropical Performance Grammy Award. In 1998, she won an ACE Award.

On May 31, 1998, La India performed two sold-out concerts at the Luis A. Ferre Performing Arts Center in San Juan, Puerto Rico. She returned to the United States, and television network UPN aired one of her shows. With training provided by New York's famed choreographer Sara D'Arce India was also able to perform concerts in New York's Madison Square Garden and in El Festival de la Calle Ocho in Miami, Florida. In September 1999, La India released her album Sola, which earned positive reviews for the single Sola and for covers of two hits by the late Cuban sensation La Lupe, Que Te Pedi and Si Vuelves Tu.

On February 5, 2000, a full-page ad in Billboard Magazine congratulated La India for her second Grammy Award nomination. In March 2000, she was featured in Vibe Magazine. On November 26, 2003, La India released Latin Songbird: Mi Alma y Corazón. The album's lead single "Sedúceme" became a hit on the Latin charts, and topped the U.S. Billboard Hot Latin Tracks for several weeks. This romantic salsa hit single was La India's first number-one song. Latin Songbird brought her a new fan base with many awards and nominations, including two Latin Grammy nominations for Best Salsa Album and Best Tropical Song in 2003, and her third Grammy Award nomination for Best Salsa Album in 2004.

In 2005, La India participated in the musical presentation Selena ¡VIVE!, a tribute to the late Tejano sensation Selena Quintanilla-Perez. In 2006, La India released the album Soy Diferente, which contained two songs that became award-winning hits. The 2007 Annual Latin Billboard Awards honored La India with Best Tropical Album of the Year Female for "Soy Diferente" (I Am Different), and Latin Dance Club Play Track of the Year for "Solamente Una Noche" (Just for One Night). In 2007, La India collaborated with Latin sensation Gloria Estefan in a duet titled "90 Millas."

On June 11, 2006, La India was honored by Union City, New Jersey with a star on the Walk of Fame at Union City's Celia Cruz Park.

La India released her ninth studio album in 2010. La India mentioned to the Associated Press, "I am reinventing myself ... changing my physical image. La India will return to become a Barbie. But more than that, I feel like a new woman because I have been blessed with many beautiful things. After many years, I have my family with me, and I am not separated from my mother, in which I suffered greatly. I have her in my life, and that brings inner peace that I haven't had in a long time."

On February 23, 2010, La India's hit single "Estupida" was released on iTunes. The single was a cover of the 2009 Italian version "Stupida" by Alessandra Amoroso. La India's ninth studio album, Unica, was released June 1, 2010.

In 2011, La India continued to release new music. She performed a duet with Issac Delgado titled "Que No Se Te Olvide." In 2011, La India released a new house track titled "Tacalacateo," on which she worked with Italian DJ Peppe Citarella. "Tacalacateo" peaked at number 13 on Billboard's dance music chart.

In 2012, La India performed as part of UNITY : The Latin Tribute to Michael Jackson, along with other Latin artists such as Tito Nieves and Kevin Ceballo.

In 2014, La India once again signed with the record label Top Stop Music, also joining the Salsa Giants project with Sergio George. La India released her tenth studio salsa album "Intensamente Con Canciones de Juan Gabriel" on Top Stop Music in 2015. It includes duets and solo pieces by both artists. This album was number one on Billboard's tropical chart for a consecutive four weeks. One song in particular, "Ahora Que Te Vas" quickly rose to number one on Billboard's tropical chart. With this song, La India became the Latino woman with the most-ever number ones, a record previously held by Gloria Estefan.

In 2023, Rolling Stone ranked La India at number 113 on its list of the 200 Greatest Singers of All Time.

== Discography ==
=== Studio albums ===
Year	Title	Peak chart positions				Certifications
Year	Title	US	US Tropical	US Latin	Heatseekers	Certifications
1990	Breaking Night: Label: Reprise; Format: LP • CD • cassette	—	—	—	—	
1992	Llego La India, Via Eddie Palmieri: Label: Soho Sounds; Format: LP • CD • cassette	—	5	—	—	
1994	Dicen Que Soy: Label: RMM; Format: LP • CD • cassette	—	1	4	—	
1997	Sobre el Fuego: Label: RMM; Format: CD • cassette	—	1	4	33	
1999	Sola: Label: RMM; Format: CD • cassette	—	4	7	20	
2002	Latin Songbird: Mi Alma y Corazón: Label: Sony Discos; Format: CD	—	1	7	19	RIAA: 2× Platinum (Latin)
2006	Soy Diferente: Label: Univision Music Group; Format: CD	—	1	11	9	RIAA: Gold (Latin)
2010	Unica: Label: Top Stop Music; Format: CD	180	1	4	—	
2015	Intensamente Con Canciones de Juan Gabriel: Label: Top Stop Music; Format: CD	—	1	3	—	
"—" denotes album that did not chart or was not released in the region.

=== Compilation albums ===
Year	Title	Peak chart positions	
Year	Title	US Tropical	US LatinBillboard Top Latin Albums
1996	Lo Mejor de India: Label: RMM; Format: CD	—	—
1997	Mega Mix: Label: RMM / Soho Latino; Format: CD • cassette	—	—
2001	The Best...: Label: RMM; Format: CD	—	—
2005	Grandes Exitos +: Label: RMM; Format: CD	7	11
"—" denotes album that did not chart or was not released in the region.

=== EPs ===
Year	Title
1994	Love and Happiness (w/ River Ocean): Label: Strictly Rhythm; Format: LP • CD

=== Contributions on other recordings ===
- 1988 - Mirage
- By Jellybean & Little Louie Vega (Featured on the "B" side of the 12" Single of 'Just A Mirage')
- With Tony Humphries
  - Keith Thompson – Rhythm of Life
- With Masters at Work
  - 1992 – Ride On The Rhythm by Louie Vega & Marc Anthony (wrote/background vocals)
  - 1993 – When You Touch Me and I Can't Get No Sleep (from The Album)
  - 1994 – Voices In My Mind by Voices (India, Carol Sylvan, Michael Watford)
  - 1994 – Vibe P.M. (Masters at Work Remix) (featured with Mondo Grosso)
  - 1998 – To Be In Love (MAW Remix) (from MAW Records: The Collection Volume I)
  - 1996 – Runaway (from Nuyorican Soul)
  - 2002 – Backfired (from Our Time Is Coming)
- RMM Combinacion Perfecta
  - 1994 – Vivir Lo Nuestro (duet with Marc Anthony)
- Li'l Mo Ying Yang
  - 1995 Reach (samples "Love & Happiness")
- Voces Unidas: The Atlanta Olympics
  - 1996 – Banderas
- JohNick – Play The World EP
  - 1996 – Play The World (samples "Love & Happiness")
- With Oscar D'León
  - 1997 – Hazme El Amor (from En Nueva York)
- Puff Daddy & the Family – No Way Out
  - 1997 – Senorita (samples India's "No Me Conviene")
- The Last Days of Disco Original Motion Picture Soundtrack
  - 1998 – I Love the Nightlife (Disco Round)
- The 24-Hour Woman Original Motion Picture Soundtrack
  - 1999 – India Con La Voe (Viva Puerto Rico)
- Haus-A-Holics – Latin Spice EP
  - 2001 – Que Pasa by Haus-A-Holics (samples "Oye Como Va" with Tito Puente Jr.)
- Empire Original Motion Picture Soundtrack
  - 2003 – Empire, Imperio
- With Tito Nieves, Nicky Jam, and K-Mil
  - 2004 – Ya No Queda Nada
- With Ivy Queen
  - 2004 – "Tócame" (from Real)
- Tribute to Selena
  - 2005 – No Debes Jugar (from Selena ¡VIVE!)
- With Marlon Fernández
  - 2006 – Usted Abusó (from Mi Sueño)
- With R.K.M & Ken-Y, Polaco, Nicky Jam, and Carlitos Way
  - 2006 – Tocarte Toda
- With Gloria Estefan
  - 2007–90 Millas (from 90 Millas)
- With Michael Stuart
  - 2007 – Un Amor Tan Grande (from Sentimiento De Un Rumbero)
- With Yolandita Monge
  - 2008 – Mala (Tropical Remix) (from "Mala")
- With Tito "El Bambino"
  - 2009 – El Amor (Salsa Remix) (from "El Patron")
- ' 2010 – "Un Verano En Nueva York" (from Banco Popular De PR – Salsa, Un Homenaje A El Gran Combo Album)
- With Issac Delgado
  - 2011 – Maxi single "Que No Se Te Olvide"
- With Peppe Citarella
  - 2011 – Maxi single "Tacalacateo"
- With Tito Rojas
  - 2011 – "Maldito y Bendito Amor" (Salsa version)
  - 2011 – "Maldito y Bendito Amor" (Ballad version)
- ' 2013 – "Tu no tienes alma" (from the "Y Si Fueran Ellas" albuml)
- With Sergio George's Salsa Giants
  - 2014 – "Bajo La Tormenta" (from Sergio George Presents: Salsa Giants Plus)
- With Tony Succar – Unity the Latin Tribute to Michael Jackson
  - 2015 – "Earth song"
- With Tony Succar - Mimy Y Tony
  - 2023 - "Sin Fronteras"

== Awards and nominations ==
=== Latin Grammy ===
Year	Nominee / work	Award	Result
2016	Intensamente con Canciones de Juan Gabriel	Best Salsa Album	Won

=== Latin American Music Awards of 2016 ===
Year	Nominee / work	Award	Result
2016	Intensamente con Canciones de Juan Gabriel	Favorite Album—Tropical	Nominated

=== Lo Nuestro Awards ===
Year	Nominee / work	Award	Result
2004	La India (herself)	Tropical Female Artist	Nominated
2004	La India (herself)	Best Salsa Performance	Nominated
2004	Seduceme	Best Tropical Song	Nominated
2004	Mi Alma Y Corazon	Best Tropical Album	Nominated
2005	La India (herself)	Female Artist Of The Year	Nominated
2007	Soy Diferente	Best Tropical Album	Nominated
2007	La India (herself)	Female Artist Of The Year	Nominated
2007	La India & Cheka	Group Or Duo Of The Year	Nominated
2011	La India (herself)	Female Artist Of The Year	Nominated
2011	Estupida	Best Tropical Song	Nominated
2016	La India (herself)	Female Artist Of The Year	Nominated

=== Billboard Latin Music Awards ===
Year	Nominee / work	Award	Result
2003	Latin Songbird: Mi Alma Y Corazon	Tropical Album Of The Year	Won
2004	La India (Herself)	Seduceme (Remix)	Won
2006	Grandes Exitos	Tropical Album Of The Year	Nominated
2007	Soy Diferente	Tropical Album Of The Year	Won
2007	Pura Salsa	Tropical Album Of The Year	Nominated

== See also ==
- List of Puerto Ricans
- Nuyorican
- Puerto Ricans in New York City
