= Speed garage =

Genre of electronic dance music

- Stylistic origins: Garage house; jungle music
- Cultural origins: Early to mid-1990s, United Kingdom and United States
- Derivative forms: Bassline; donk

Other topics
- UK hard house

Speed garage (occasionally known as plus-8) is a genre of electronic dance music, associated with the UK garage scene, of which it is regarded as one of its subgenres. It emerged in London in the mid-1990s, reached commercial peak in 1997 and 1998, and was a direct precursor to both 2-step garage and Bassline.

== Etymology ==
The term "Speed Garage" was only heard widely for the first time in early 1997. Garage House, when played at 130 bpm, became known as speed garage. Armand Van Helden, often credited as the style's originator, did not give his production style a name other than the "Armand mix". The speed garage label was applied later as British producers adopted it.

== Characteristics ==
Speed garage features sped-up NY garage 4-to-the-floor rhythms that are combined with breakbeats. Snares are placed as over the 2nd and the 4th kickdrums, so in other places of the drum pattern. Speed garage tunes have warped, heavy basslines, influenced by jungle and reggae. Sweeping bass is typical for speed garage. It is also typical for speed garage tunes to have a breakdown. Speed garage tunes sometimes featured time-stretched vocals. As it is heavily influenced by jungle, speed garage makes heavy use of jungle and dub sound effects, such as gunshots and sirens.

== History ==
=== Origins (1995-1996) ===
Although speed garage is generally considered a British genre, its sound was first developed by American producers. Around 1997, London DJs paired the descendants of US-based Garage with cavernous, half-tempo basslines, but the style's first steps came from records by New Jersey producer Todd Edwards and New York-based Armand Van Helden. Van Helden's remix of CJ Bolland's "Sugar is Sweeter" is considered by some to be the first true speed garage track. Van Helden later described the drum and bass influence on his work, saying he had not thought of it as Speed Garage when he started, and that he had been into drum and bass for years.

=== Breakthrough and Commercial peak (1997-1998) ===
Van Helden's speed garage remix of Sneaker Pimps' "Spin Spin Sugar" in 1997 further popularised the genre and is sometimes credited with breaking speed garage into the mainstream. The single reached number 21 on the UK Singles Chart and number 1 on the UK Dance Chart. Muzik magazine named the remix the best remix of 1997.

British producers quickly adapted the sound. Double 99's "RipGroove" is often cited as the record that defined the genre, turning Van Helden's experimental remix style into something accessible to both jungle and garage audiences. The track reached number 14 on the UK Singles Chart on its second release in 1997. The genre achieved much greater commercial success than jungle, entering the charts within months of gaining mainstream attention. 187 Lockdown's debut single "Gunman" reached number 16 on the UK Singles Chart and topped the UK Dance Chart in November 1997, and the duo's follow up "Kung-Fu", released on 13 April 1998, reached number 9 on the UK Singles Chart and Number 1 on the UK Dance Chart. Other chart entries included Serious Danger's "Deeper", which peaked at number 40 in December 1997, and the Fabulous Baker Boys' "Oh Boy", which peaked at number 34 in November 1997.

The scene was supported by DJs and pirate radio. Early promoters of the UK garage sound included DJ EZ, Dreem Teem, and Tuff Jam, alongside pirate stations such as London Underground.

A distinctly British character took hold during this period. While Van Helden pioneered the style in America, the British version incorporated hard breakbeats, gunshots, and time-stretching in a more direct, jungle-influenced manner.

=== Transition to 2-step ===
By mid-1998, speed garage had become known as "UK Garage" and "2-step", and had begun to merge with hip-hop and British urban music. The most radical change from speed garage to 2-step was the removal of the second and fourth kick from each bar. One of the earliest records bridging the two styles was the 1997 Kelly G remix of Tina Moore's "Never Gonna Let You Go", which peaked at number 7 on the UK Chart.

== Legacy ==
Speed Garage was a primary ancestor of bassline. Sheffield's Niche nightclub played speed garage mixed with melodic vocal house in the late 1990s. According to owner Steve Baxendale, the club's DJs began removing vocals from speed garage and house tracks and boosting the bass from around 1997.

== Resurgence in the 2020s ==
In the early 2020s, speed garage experienced a notable resurgence within the UK music scene. This renewed interest in speed garage has been accompanied by a broader UK garage revival.

In November 2024, Interplanetary Criminal teamed up with Sammy Virji to release "Damager".
