= Little Louie Vega =

American DJ and record producer (born 1965)

"Little Louie" Vega
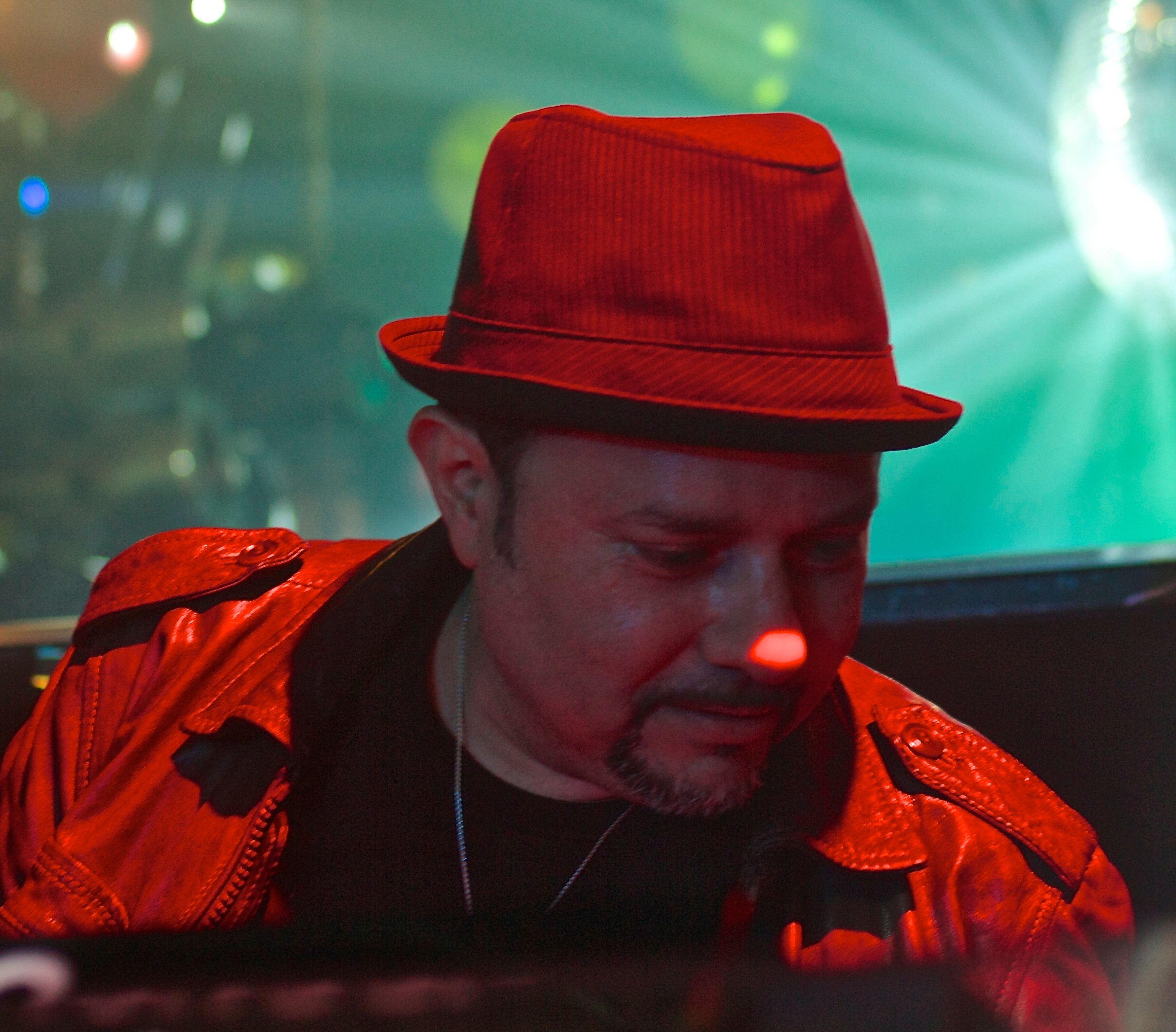
- Vega at Club Air, Tokyo in 2014

Background information
- Born: Luis Ferdinand Vega Jr. June 12, 1965 (age 61); Bronx, New York, U.S.
- Genres: Electronic; house; Latin; Afro house
- Occupations: DJ; record producer; remixer
- Labels: Vega; Defected
- Website: louievega.com

Luis Ferdinand Vega Jr. (born June 12, 1965), a.k.a. "Little Louie" Vega, is an American DJ, record producer and remixer of Puerto Rican ancestry. He is one half of the Masters at Work musical production team.

== Biography ==
He was born to a musician family, as his father, Luis F. Vega Sr., was a jazz saxophonist, and his uncle was singer Héctor Lavoe of the Fania All-Stars. Vega embarked on his music career as a disc jockey, spinning records at the age of 13.

By 1985, Louie began playing house and block parties in his local Bronx. His first nightclub residency was at the Devil's Nest, in the Bronx, and later he moved to heartthrob (the old Funhouse), Roseland, Studio 54 and the Palladium in Manhattan. During the 1990s, Vega was playing at one of the most influential nightclubs for house music, The Sound Factory Bar, at the Underground Network Parties with promoters Don Welch and Barbara Tucker (also singer). During this time, production team Masters at Work began a remixing team which consisted of young producers "Little Louie" Vega and partner Kenny "Dope" Gonzalez.

Vega's uncle is salsa vocalist Héctor Lavoe, while Gonzalez's father, Hector Torres, also performs salsa. Vega is also the cousin of Eric Vega, a popular event creator and promoter in New York City. Louie Vega is presently married to vocalist Ana Martins, also known as Anané Vega.

Louie Vega was ranked number 5 at the Top House Artists of 2020 by Traxsource.

Louie Vega was ranked number 1 at the Top Artists of 2021 by Traxsource.

== Discography ==
See Masters at Work for the rest of his discography

=== Albums ===
- Elements of Life (2004)
- Elements of Life Extensions (2005)
- Elements of Life Eclipse (2013)
- Louie Vega Starring...XXVIII (2016)
- NYC Disco (2018)
- Expansions In The NYC (2022)

=== Singles ===
==== Louie Vega/"Little" Louie Vega ====
- 1991 "Ride on the Rhythm", with Marc Anthony
- 1996 "Hip Hop Jazz EP", with Jeffrey Collins
- 2000 "Elements of Life", with Blaze
- 2000 "Life Goes On", with Arnold Jarvis
- 2002 "Diamond Life", with Jay 'Sinister' Sealee and Julie McKnight
- 2002 "Brand New Day", with Blaze
- 2003 "Cerca De Mi", with Raul Midon and Albert Menendez
- 2003 "Africa/Brasil"
- 2004 "Thousand Fingered Man"
- 2004 "Mozalounge", with Anané, Raul Midon and Albert Menendez
- 2004 "Journey's Prelude", with Ursula Rucker
- 2004 "Love is on the Way", with Blaze
- 2004 "Steel Congo", with House of Rhumba
- 2005 "V Gets Jazzy", with Mr. V
- 2006 "Joshua's Jam", with Blaze
- 2007 "Here to Stay", with Soni
- 2016 "A New Day", with Caron Wheeler and Jazzie B

==== Sole Fusion ====
- 1992 "We Can Make It"
- 1994 "Bass Tone"
- 1995 "The Chosen Path", with Kenny Dope
- 1997 "We Can Make It '97"

==== Freestyle Orchestra ====
- 1989 "Don't Tell Me", with Todd Terry
- 1990 "Keep on Pumpin' it up", with Todd Terry
- 1998 "I Don't Understand This", with Kenny Dope
- 1998 "Odyssey/I'm Ready", with Kenny Dope

==== Hardrive/Hardrive 2000 ====
- 1992 "Sindae", with Kenny Dope
- 1993 "Deep Inside EP"
- 1993 "Hardrive EP", with Kenny Dope
- 1999 "2000 EP"
- 1999 "Never Forget", with Lynae

==== Other aliases ====
- 1989 "There's a Bat in my House", as Caped Crusaders, with Todd Terry
- 1990 "Afrika", as History, with Q-Tee
- 1994 "Love & Happiness", as River Ocean, with India
- 1994 "The Tribal EP", as River Ocean, with India
- 1994 "Curious", as Sun Sun Sun, with Lem Springsteen
- 1995 "Reach", as Lil Mo Yin Yang, with Erick Morillo
- 1995 "Freaky", as Lou², with Lil Louis
- 1996 "The Missile", as The Chameleon
- 1996 "Shout-n-Out", as Lood, with Mood II Swing

==== Production for other artists ====
- 1987 Erasure - songs "Victim of Love" (Little louie Vega mix) and "Hideaway" (Little Louie Vega mix) on the remix album The Two Ring Circus
- 1987 The Cover Girls - "Because of You", with Robert Clivilles
- 1988 Noel - "Like a Child", with Roman Ricardo
- 1990 Kimiesha Holmes - "Love me True"
- 1990 2 in a Room - "Take me Away", with Aldo Marin
- 1994 Barbara Tucker - "I Get Lifted"
- 1995 Barbara Tucker - "Stay Together"
- 1998 Donnell Rush - "Perfect Day for Company", with Lem Springsteen
- 2001 Gloria Estefan - "Y-Tu-Conga"
- 2003 Anané - "Nos Vida/Mon Amour"
- 2003 Ursula Rucker - "Release"
- 2004 Kenny Bobien - "Spread Love"
- 2005 Anané - "Amazing Love"
- 2005 Anané - "Let Me Love You", with Mr. V
- 2005 Anané - "Move, Bounce, Shake", with Mr. V
- 2007 Mr. V - "Put Your Drink Down"

== See also ==
- List of number-one dance hits (United States)
- List of artists who reached number one on the US Dance chart
