= List of house music artists =

This is a list of artists who have been involved with house music, a genre of electronic dance music. This includes artists who have either been very important to the house music genre or have had a considerable amount of exposure (such as in the case of one who has been on a major label). This list does not include little-known local artists. Groups are listed by the first letter in the group's name (not including the words "a", "an", or "the"), and individuals are listed by first name.

== 0–9 ==
- 009 Sound System
- 20 Fingers
- 2 Puerto Ricans, a Blackman, and a Dominican
- 2 Unlimited
- 49ers
- 808 State

== A ==
- A-Trak
- ABC
- Adeva
- Adonis
- Afrojack
- Alec Empire
- Alesso
- Alex Gaudino
- Alex Party
- Alexandra Prince
- Alexandra Stan
- Alison Limerick
- Aly-Us
- Amber
- Angie Brown
- Ann Nesby
- AnnaGrace
- Annie Mac
- Anthony Pappa
- Antoine Clamaran
- Armand Van Helden
- Armin van Buuren
- Arty
- Ashley Beedle
- The Aston Shuffle
- ATB
- The Avalanches
- Avicii
- Axwell
- Aya

== B ==
- B.E.D.
- B.G., the Prince of Rap
- Bad Boy Bill
- Bag Raiders
- Barbara Tucker
- The Basement Boys
- Basement Jaxx
- Beatmasters
- Bellatrax
- Benny Benassi
- Billie Ray Martin
- Bingo Players
- Bingoboys
- Bizarre Inc
- Black Box
- Black Coffee
- Blasterjaxx
- Blaze
- The Bloody Beetroots
- Blue Pearl
- Bob Sinclar
- BodyRockers
- Bomb the Bass
- Boogie Pimps
- Booka Shade
- Boris Dlugosch
- Brooklyn Bounce
- Brother Brown
- Brothers in Rhythm
- BT
- Busy P
- Byron Stingily

== C ==
- C+C Music Factory
- Calvin Harris
- Cappella
- Captain Hollywood Project
- Carl Cox
- Carol Jiani
- Cash Cash
- Cassius
- The Cataracs
- Cathy Dennis
- CeCe Peniston
- CeCe Rogers
- Celeda
- Charles Schillings
- The Chemical Brothers
- Chicane
- Chip E.
- Chocolate Puma
- Chris Brann
- Chris Fortier
- Chris Lake
- Chuckie
- Clazziquai
- Clean Bandit
- CLMD
- Club 69
- Cobra Starship
- Cold Blank
- Coldcut
- Colonel Abrams
- Colton Ford
- Corona
- Crookers
- Crystal Waters
- Curtis Jones

== D ==
- D Mob
- D:Fuse
- D:Ream
- Da Mob
- Dada Life
- Dada Nada
- Daft Punk
- Daisy Dee
- Dajae
- Daniel Desnoyers
- Dannii Minogue
- Danny Tenaglia
- Darin Epsilon
- Daphne Rubin-Vega
- Dave Audé
- Dave Clarke
- David Deejay
- David Guetta
- David Morales
- David Vendetta
- Deadmau5
- Deborah Cooper
- Deborah Cox
- Deee-Lite
- Deep Dish
- Dennis Ferrer
- Derrick Carter
- Deskee
- Dev
- Diana King
- Dimitri from Paris
- Dimitri Vegas & Like Mike
- Dina Carroll
- Diplo
- Dirty South
- Dirty Vegas
- The Disco Boys
- DJ Alligator
- DJ Antoine
- DJ Colette
- DJ Dan
- DJ Disciple
- DJ Falcon
- DJ Icey
- DJ Irene
- DJ Jean
- DJ Magic Mike
- DJ Manian
- DJ Pierre
- DJ Skribble
- DJ Sneak
- DJ Spinna
- DJ Tonka
- DJ Vibe
- Donna Allen
- Donna Summer
- Doug Lazy
- Dr. Alban
- Dr. Mix
- Dream Frequency
- Duck Sauce
- Dyro

== E ==
- East Clubbers
- Eddie Amador
- Edward Maya
- Eric "E-Smoove" Miller
- Eric Prydz
- Erick Morillo
- Etienne de Crécy
- Euphoria
- Evelyn Thomas
- Everything but the Girl

== F ==
- Faithless
- Farley Jackmaster Funk
- Fast Eddie
- Fatboy Slim
- Fantastic Plastic Machine
- Fedde le Grand
- Feed me
- Felix
- Felix da Housecat
- Fierce Ruling Diva
- François K
- Frankie Knuckles
- Freak Nasty
- Fred Everything
- Freemasons
- Full Intention
- Funkerman

== G ==
- Gabrielle
- Gaelle
- General Levy
- Gillette
- Gigi D'Agostino
- Global Deejays
- Graham Stack
- Grant Nelson
- The Greenskeepers
- Greg Stainer
- Groove Armada
- Gryffin
- A Guy Called Gerald
- Guy Gerber

== H ==
- Haddaway
- Hardwell
- Havana Brown
- Heather Small
- Hedkandi
- Hercules and Love Affair
- Hernán Cattáneo
- Hyper Crush

== I ==
- Ian Carey
- Ian Pooley
- Icona Pop
- iiO
- Inaya Day
- India
- Inna
- Inner City
- Ivan Gough

== J ==
- Jam & Spoon
- James Holden
- Jamie Principle
- Jaydee
- Jay-J
- Jeffree Star
- Jellybean
- Jersey Street
- Jerome Sydenham
- Jesse Saunders
- Jimpster
- Jocelyn Brown
- Jocelyn Enriquez
- Joel Fletcher
- Joey Beltram
- Joey Negro
- John Creamer & Stephane K
- John Digweed
- John Dahlback
- Joi Cardwell
- Jomanda
- Jonathan Peters
- Jori Hulkkonen
- Josh Wink
- JS16
- Juliet Roberts
- Junior Jack
- Junior Sanchez
- Junior Vasquez
- Junkie XL
- Justice

== K ==
- Kaskade
- Katalina
- Kavinsky
- Kaz James
- Kelly Llorenna
- Kenny "Dope" Gonzalez
- Kerri Chandler
- Kevin Aviance
- Kiesza
- Kill the Noise
- Killer Bunnies
- Kim English
- King Britt
- K-Klass
- The KLF
- Klubbheads
- Knife Party
- Kosmik Kommando
- Krewella
- Kristine W
- Kym Mazelle
- Kygo

== L ==
- La Bouche
- Larry Levan
- Laidback Luke
- Larry Heard
- Laurent Garnier
- Laurent Wolf
- Late Night Alumni
- Lazy Dog
- Le Click
- Leftfield
- Le Knight Club
- Lenny Fontana
- Lil Louis
- Linda Clifford
- Lisa Shaw
- Little Louie Vega
- Livin' Joy
- Liz Torres
- LMFAO
- Loleatta Holloway
- Lone
- Lonnie Gordon
- Louis La Roche
- Love Inc.
- LPZ
- Luciana

== M ==
- M People
- Madeon
- Madison Avenue
- Madison Park
- Magic Affair
- Marc Mysterio
- Mark Dynamix
- Mark Farina
- Mark Picchiotti
- Mark Summers
- MARRS
- Marshall Jefferson
- Marshmello
- Martha Wash
- Martin Garrix
- Martin Solveig
- Marusha
- Masters At Work
- Matthew Dear
- Mauro Picotto
- MC Mario
- Melanie Williams
- Melleefresh
- Metro Area
- Michael Gray
- Michael Watford
- Michelle Visage
- Miguel Migs
- Mihalis Safras
- Mike Perras
- Mike Williams
- Milk & Sugar
- Milton Jackson
- Moguai
- Moloko
- Mondo Grosso
- Monica Hughes
- Monika Kruse
- Morgan King
- Morgan Page
- Mousse T.
- Mr. Oizo
- Mstrkrft
- Murk (also performed as Funky Green Dogs)
- Mylo

== N–O ==
- Nadia Ali
- Nadirah Shakoor
- Narcotic Thrust
- Nervo
- Nicky Romero
- Nightcrawlers
- Niki Haris
- Noisia
- Nomad
- N-Joi
- N-Trance
- Oceanic
- Olav Basoski
- Offer Nissim
- One-T
- Ookay
- Opus III
- Otto Knows

== P–Q ==
- Paul Johnson
- Paul Oakenfold
- Paul Taylor
- Paul Van Dyk
- Pepper MaShay
- Pete Heller
- Pete Tong
- Peter Rauhofer
- Pet Shop Boys
- Phuture
- Phuturistix
- Planet Funk
- Planet Soul
- Porter Robinson
- Princessa
- Quentin Harris

== R ==
- R3hab
- Rachel McFarlane
- Ralphi Rosario
- Raze
- Real McCoy
- Rebecca & Fiona
- RedOne
- Regi Penxten
- Réjane Magloire
- Richard Vission
- Robbie Rivera
- Robin S.
- Robert Miles
- The Roc Project
- Roger Sanchez
- Ron Hardy
- Roy Davis Jr.
- Rudenko
- Rui da Silva
- Rune RK
- RuPaul

== S ==
- S'Express
- Sabrina Johnston
- Sabrynaah Pope
- Saint Etienne
- Samantha James
- Sander Kleinenberg
- Sander van Doorn
- Sandy B
- Sasha
- Savant
- Seamus Haji
- Sebastian Ingrosso
- Sébastien Léger
- Shakedown
- The Shamen
- Shapeshifters
- Shawn Christopher
- Shep Pettibone
- Showtek
- Sidney Samson
- Silicone Soul
- Skrillex
- Slam
- Slushii
- Sonique
- Soul II Soul
- Soul For Real
- Spiller
- Stacey Pullen
- Star Tattooed
- Stardust
- Static Revenger
- Staxx of Joy
- Stephanie Cooke
- Steps
- Stereo MC's
- Steve "Silk" Hurley
- Steve Angello
- Steve Aoki
- Steve Lawler
- Steve Porter
- Steve Stoll
- StoneBridge
- Stromae
- Superchumbo
- Su Su Bobien
- Sunscreem
- Supermen Lovers
- Supermode
- Sussie 4
- Sven Väth
- Swayzak
- Swedish House Mafia

== T ==
- Taylor Dayne
- Technotronic
- Telepopmusic
- Ten City
- Theo Keating
- Theo Parrish
- The Timelords
- Thunderpuss
- Tiefschwarz
- Tiësto
- Tiga
- Timmy Regisford
- Timmy Trumpet
- Timo Maas
- Tin Tin Out
- Tocadisco
- Todd Edwards
- Todd Terry
- Tom Middleton
- Tommy Trash
- Tom Novy
- Tom Taped
- Tom Wilson
- Tony Hewitt
- Tony Humphries
- The Toxic Avenger
- Trentemøller
- TV Rock

== U–V ==
- Ultrabeat
- Ultra Naté
- Uppermost
- Underworld
- Ursula Rucker
- Utah Saints
- Vanessa Daou
- Vernessa Mitchell
- Vicetone
- Victor Calderone
- Vika Jigulina

== W–Z ==
- Way Out West
- Whirlpool Productions
- Wolfgang Gartner
- X-Press 2
- Ya Kid K
- Yves Larock
- Yves Deruyter
- Yinon Yahel
- Zelma Davis
- Zedd

== See also ==
- Lists of musicians
- List of club DJs
- List of electro house artists
- List of progressive house artists
