= DJ Disciple =

American DJ

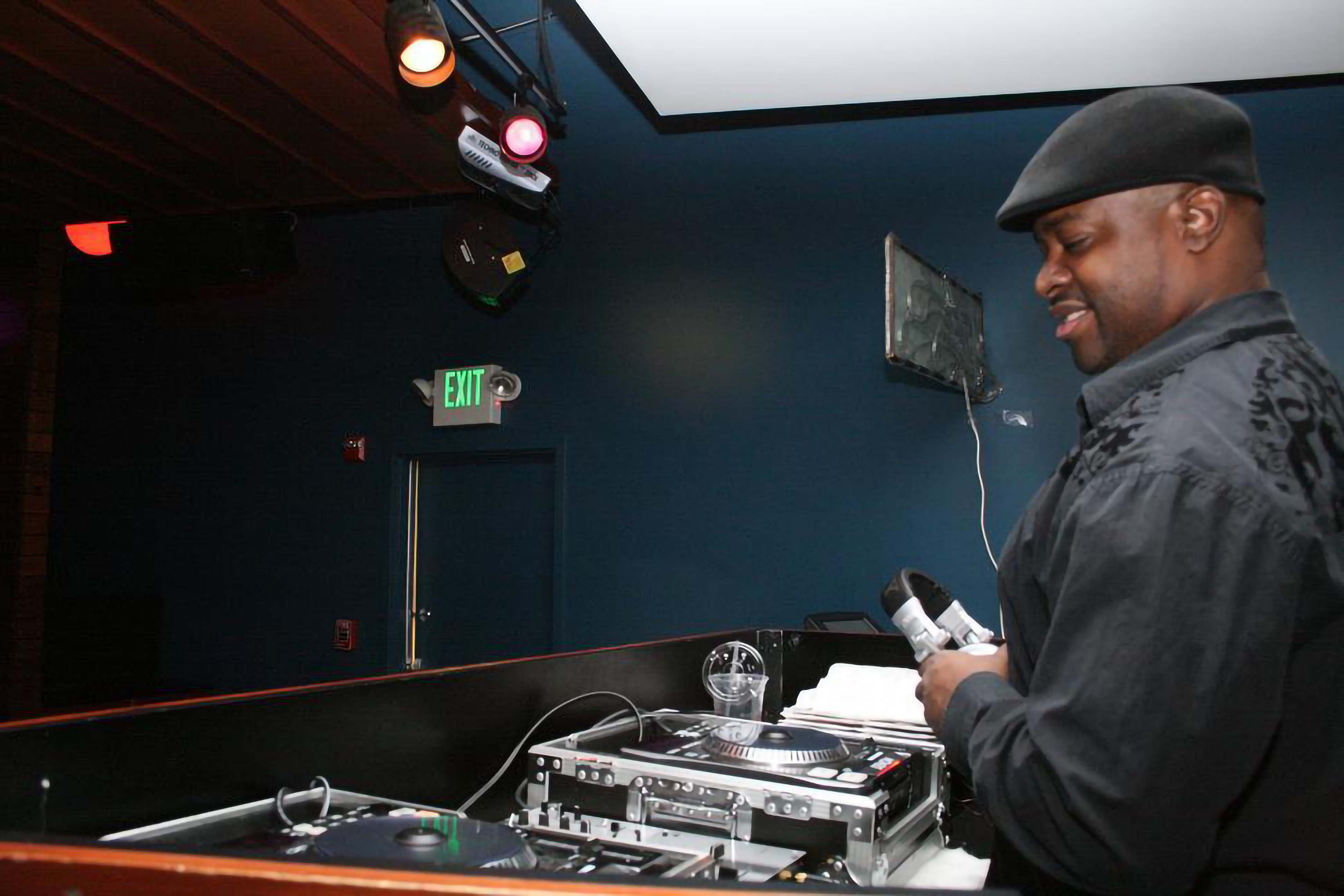
- DJ Disciple in Philadelphia

Background information
- Also known as: DJ Disciple, The Banji Boyz, Boriqua Bandits, Street Preacherz, Brooklyn Soul Boys, Innervisions
- Born: David Leander Banks; September 2, 1965 (age 61); Brooklyn, New York, U.S.
- Genres: House, EDM, tribal house, tech house
- Occupations: DJ, music producer
- Years active: 1987-present
- Labels: Catch 22 Recordings, House Trained, Vendetta, Blanco Y Negro, Nets Work International
- Spouse: Amber Banks (married 2011-2016)
- Website: www.djdisciple.net

David Banks (born September 2, 1965), known by his stage name DJ Disciple, is an American DJ, house music producer and author from Brooklyn, New York. For much of his early career, he worked in London and was influential in the rise of UK garage music. Stateside, he was considered a cornerstone of New York City's house music scene. Disciple co-wrote the book The Beat, the Scene, the Sound: A DJ's Journey through the Rise, Fall, and Rebirth of House Music in New York City with Henry Kronk.

== Early life ==
Banks was born in Brooklyn, New York in 1965, the youngest of four brothers. His father, a World War II veteran, played piano with Miles Davis and his brother Stanley played bass with George Benson. Another brother, Larry, is also a musician. Banks grew up in the Farragut Projects and attended the Greater Refuge Temple in Harlem, where he played drums. Neighbors of the family included Strafe and Shannon's bass player Rusty Taylor. Grandmaster Flowers, Jocelyn Brown, Puffy Combs, and Mary J. Blige were friends and colleagues of Banks' brothers. He graduated from Franklin Delano Roosevelt High School in 1984 and attended Baruch College to study accounting. He later switched to studying journalism.

== Career ==
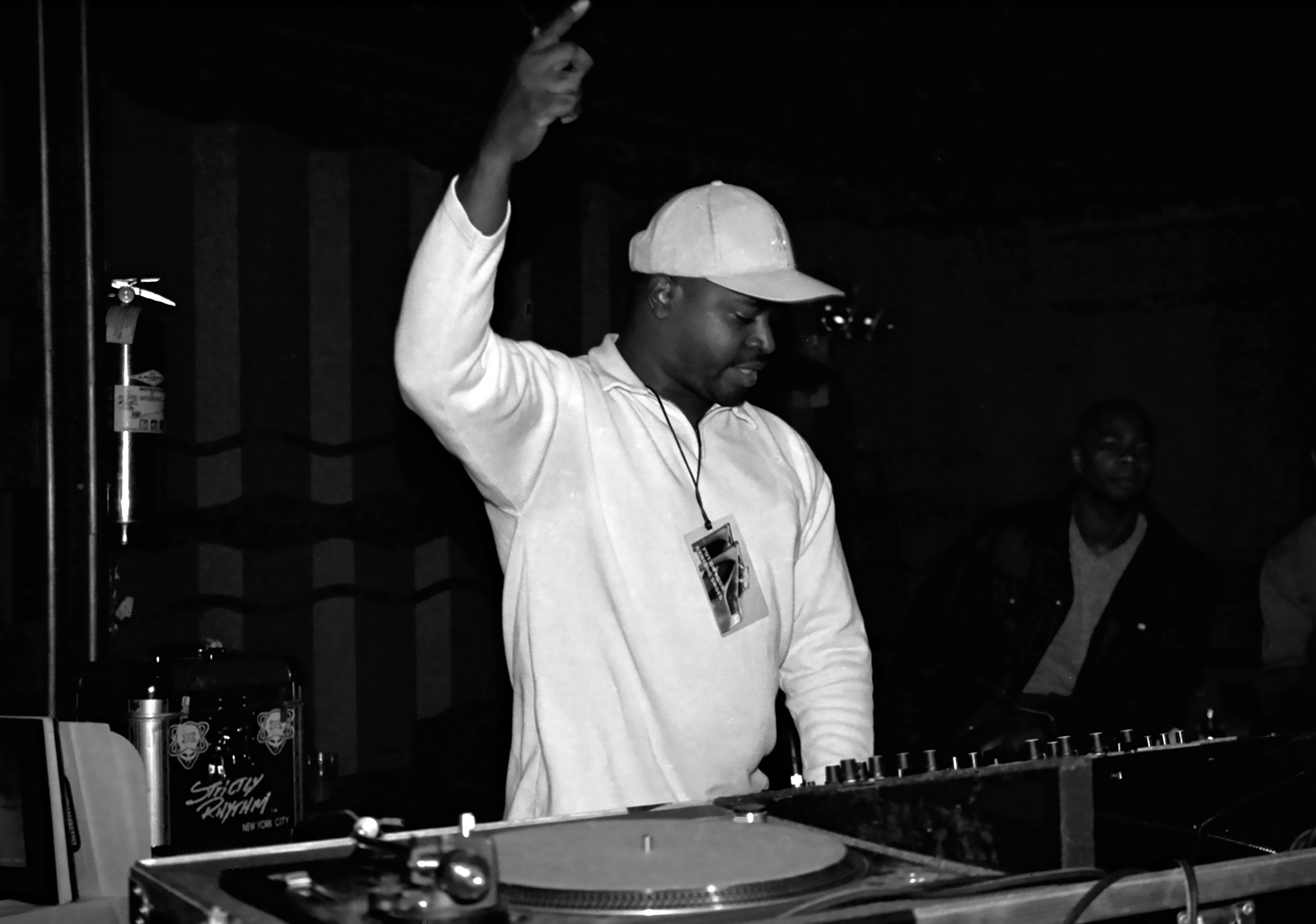
DJ Disciple at Webster Hall in NYC, 1996 (photo courtesy of Donna Ward)

In college, Banks worked at Baruch's college radio stations. He was originally a gospel DJ and chose his name as a reminder that "only what you do for Christ shall last." In 1987, he began working as a radio host and mixer for WNYE FM, where he hosted The Best Kept Secret. He gained a reputation for debuting music before its official release date. Among that music were the songs "Follow Me" (1992) by Aly-Us and "Beautiful People" (1994) by Barbara Tucker; he also aired music by Todd Terry, Louie Vega, Roger Sanchez, and Todd Edwards. His show was one of the first that featured women doing mixes. His 1995 remix of Plutonic's "Addicted" was not commercially available until 2001.

His first professional DJ gig was at Studio 54, followed by his first nightclub gig at The World in 1989. He then became the resident DJ of Wild Pitch and alternated with Larry Levan and DJ Basil at David Mancuso's Loft Space, the Choice in Lower Manhattan and made appearances at The Pyramid Club. Disciple was hired several times by two Phi Beta Sigma brothers to DJ their Hunter College parties, where he, with the help of the duo Slick & Smooth Productions caught the attention of Leonard Gabbidon and Stan Dennis. Gabbidon subsequently hired him to close shows for Jomanda, Liz Torres, Main Source, Special Ed, Run DMC, and Brand Nubian at the Syracuse Greekfest in 1989–1991. Dennis hired him to play at the Jones Beach Greekfest, while other fraternity brothers recommended him for parties at St. John's University and The City College.

In 1991, he worked as the Friday night resident DJ at Club 280 in New Jersey, then at Club Zanzibar following Tony Humphries' departure. The Best Kept Secret's popularity got him a spot as a regular mixer for Japan's World Dance Traxx Part Bay FM. With connections made through Roger Sanchez and his mentor DJ Camacho, DJ Disciple began to tour in the early 1990s. He played widely in the United Kingdom at clubs and venues including Lakota, Ministry of Sound, Notting Hill Carnival, Southport Weekender (1995–1997), Cream, and The Zap, among others. Between 1993 and 2001, he played at Ministry of Sound at least twice a year; three times a year (1994–2004) at To the Manor Born in Sedgefield; and annually (1994–2010) at Notting Hill Carnival. Across the pond, he appeared at Sona in Montréal twice a year between 1998 and 2004. He played on Kiss FM London's The Zoo Experience twice a year between 1993 and 2003.

DJ Magazine included Disciple on their list of Top 100 DJs worldwide in 1993 and did his first featured interview the following year. He debuted his first single, "When the Music Stops" on Muzik Pushers in 1993. The song quickly became a club hit in Italy and was picked up by D:vision Records. He performed at the Angels of Love club in Naples, Italy that same year. Disciple produced The Street Experience EP; three of its songs stood out in particular. "On the Dancefloor" hit the UK singles charts at No. 67. "Steal Away" featuring Dawn Tallman was included by Erick Morillo on a Ministry of Sound compilation and "Burning" was licensed to Deconstructed Records in the UK. Meanwhile, the Hard Times club in Leeds established a label in 1994. One of their first releases was DJ Disciple remixing Robert Owens and Michael Watford performing "Come Together". In 1996, he lent his vocals to Basement Jaxx's "Slide Slide" on their EP3 (Atlantic Jaxx). The first hit for Disciples' own label, Catch 22 Recordings, was "Put Your Hands Up" (1998) by the Black & White Brothers, which he mixed.

Disciple debuted as a journalist in Streetsound magazine in their July 1993 issue for his article "Unreleased Tracking - DJs Want to Know". In 1997, when Josh Harris acquired Streetsound, Disciple became the first American to vlog internationally on the internet under a new website called Pseudo.com.

=== UK garage influence ===
DJ Disciple was one of the DJs who comfortably played across both the house and UK garage spectrums.

He was embraced by the UKG scene and played guest sets at all the legendary London garage clubs such as Twice as Nice in the Arches in Southwark as well as playing the Gass Club, Horny at Legends, and Cookies & Cream in Vauxhall.

When the speed garage duo Double 99 (Tim Deluxe and Omar Adimora) sat down to make "Ripgroove", they initially built a drum pattern on an E-mu SP-1200 drum machine using samples from a disc DJ Disciple had given to Liken on a recent trip to America.

His UKG anthems include "Keep On Movin", a track by the Banji Boyz featuring Brown Girl (alias of Angie Brown; "2 the Bone" by Grant Nelson featuring DJ Disciple himself and his remix of Plutonic's "I'm Addicted".

Other UK garage collaborations include "Don't Shut Me Out" (DJ Disciple feat. Mary Gold), "Dangerous (DJ Disciple 91.5 Mix)" (Tuff Jam feat. Mr. X), "Steal Away (R.I.P Remix)" (DJ Disciple feat. Dawn Tallman), "Takin' It Back" (R.I.P feat. DJ Disciple), and "Desire" (with Jeremy Sylvester). Disciple left WNYE FM in 1997 to host the Transatlantic Mix on Kiss 105 in Yorkshire with Tony Walker, which later expanded onto the Galaxy Network across the UK in 1999.

=== Late 1990s ===
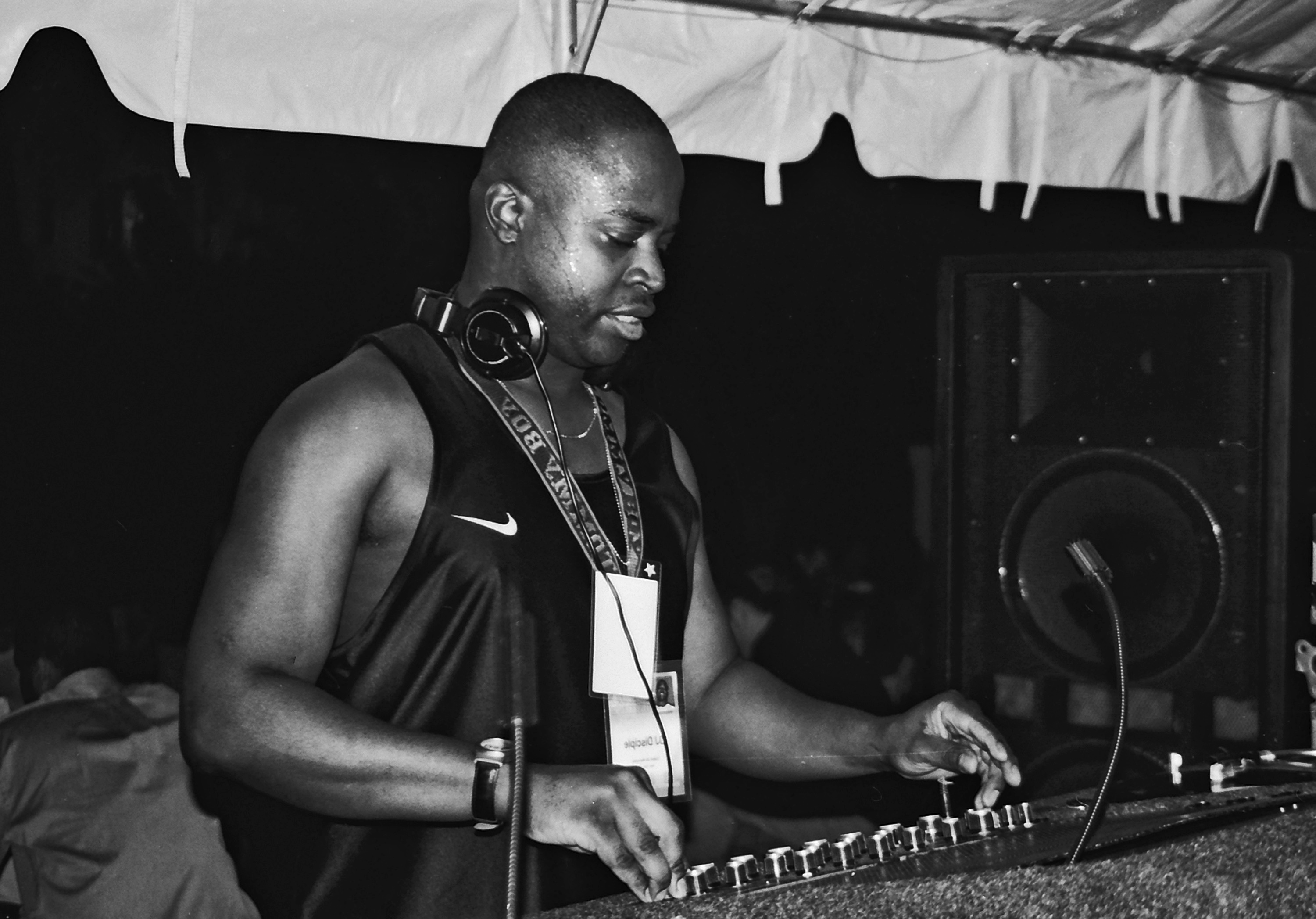
DJ Disciple at the Maxi WMC party in Miami, Florida (photo courtesy of Donna Ward)

In 1998, Disciple made regular appearances at Spy Bar, one of the first bottle service venues in New York. During the golden age of bottle service, Disciple worked at Pangea, with Walter Kim at Rehab and Quo, Jamie Muholland and Jayma Cardoso at Cain, Versace Mansion in Florida, Rocco Ancarola at Pink Elephant, and the Made Italy parties held at Green House. Disciple was also the monthly resident DJ at GBH (Great British House) with promoters Tom Dunkley and Alejandro Torio moving from Vanity to Cheetah and then finally Centrofly.

In 2001, he began writing about his experiences on the website Trust the DJ, which eventually gave way to his CD Trust the DJ DS01, which detailed notable clubs he had played around the world.

=== My True Colors ===
In 2000, DJ Disciples' first full-length album My True Colors was released on Catch 22. The album included "It's Easy" which reached No. 96 on the UK Singles Chart, "Wannabe" featuring Taka Boom, "Yes" by Suzy (licensed to Ked Kandi) and his 2002 single "Caught Up" which hit No. 1 on the US Billboard Hot Dance Club Play chart, and was nominated for a Grammy that November and appeared on the Queer as Folk soundtrack. "You" was remixed by Roger Sanchez in 2001 and "Keep It Up" was a collaboration with Robbie Rivera.

=== Late 2000s to present ===
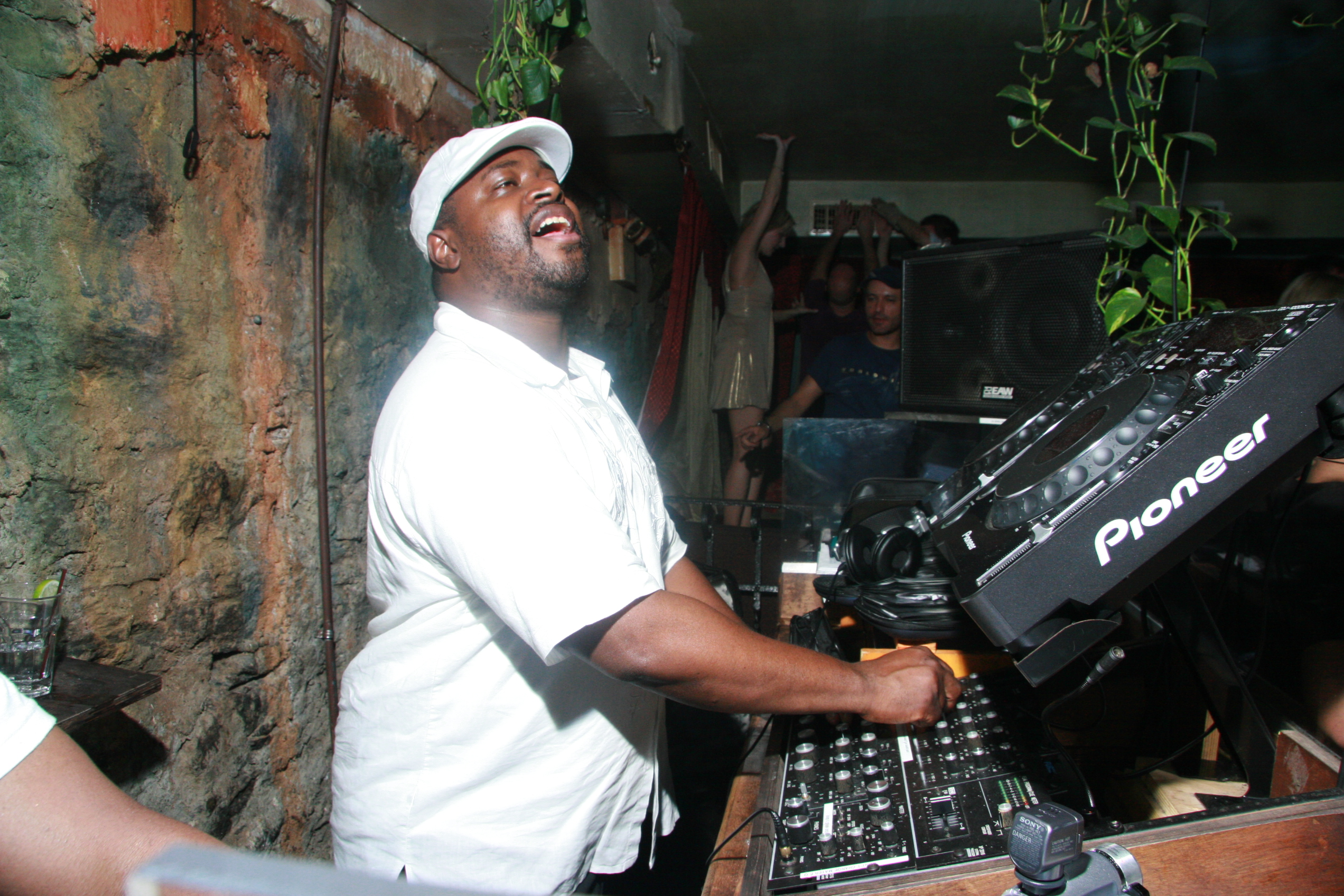
DJ Disciple at Le Souk Harem

In 2008 Disciple had success doing his own Next Level Party events in Brooklyn, New York with a mixture of Poetry. Guests included The Martinez Brothers, Wunmi, Ursula Rucker, Last Poets Abiodun Oyewole, and the local community of DJs. Disciple filmed The Next Level Party Documentary as a seven-part series made online via YouTube. While taking a break from traveling and producing music in 2012 Disciple was still able to make appearances at Cielo, Sullivan Rooms, Bar 13, Coney Island, Fort Greene Park Festival and maintain his residencies at Le Souk and his own party Release. Release, located at Sapphire Lounge had Disciple play with Deep house maestroes Hex Hector, John Benitez, Dj Spinna, DJ Suki, and Duce Martinez, amongst others. When Hurricane Sandy hit last year Release held the event that was able to give goods, food and clothing to those hit hardest.

In 2015, the owners of Sapphire Lounge changed things up and rebranded Sapphire Lounge as The Rumpus Room. After some downtime, Disciple launched another Tuesday night party at the venue, Feel Real in 2017, in homage to the legendary London party that used to go down in Covenant Gardens. The party ended in March 2020 after COVID-19. In October 2016, he became the music programmer for Martha's Country Bakery in the Williamsburg neighborhood of Brooklyn. In 2017, his label, Catch 22, celebrated its 20-year anniversary.

From 2017- 2019 every October, he began hosting the King in Me event at PS 287. Sponsored by The Church of the Open Door, the conference brings together boys aged five to fifteen to empower, raise self-awareness, and talk about what it takes to become a DJ. In response to COVID-19, Disciple started doing live streams at The Funktion House in 2021

=== Collaborations and remixes ===
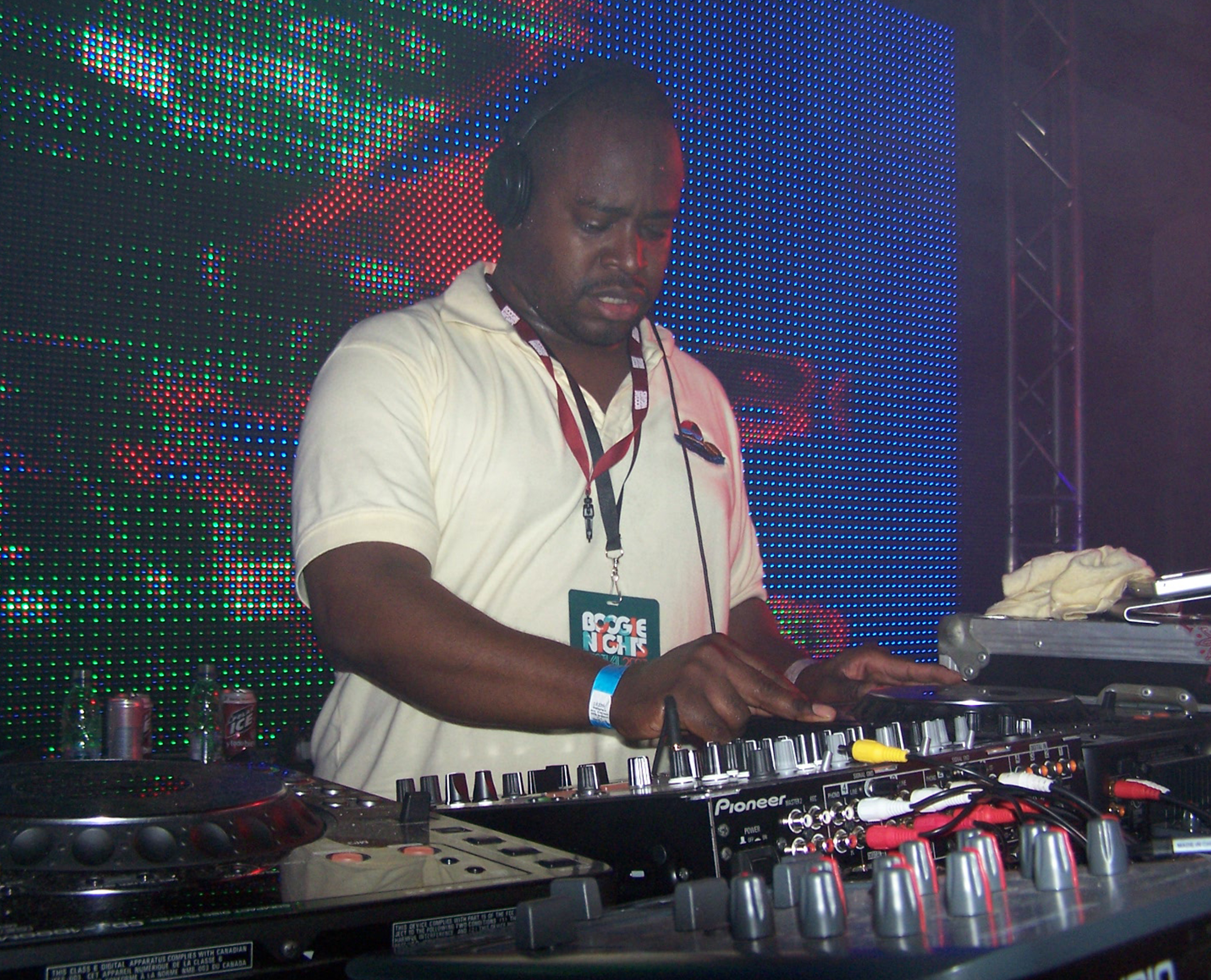
DJ Disciple at Boogie Nights Festival in Venezuela 2007

Among the many songs Disciple has remixed are Xaviera Gold "Good Luv" (Music Box Records) (1994), Buzzin Cuzzins Feat. Romanthony's "Let Me Show You Love" (Azuli) (1994), 95 North Featuring Sabrynaah Pope "Hold On" (Remixes) (King Street) (1994), House Foundation Featuring Akiko Wada's "Free At Last"(Musical Force Records) (1995), Boris Dlugosch Presents Boom! "Keep Pushin'" (The Remixes) (1996) (MAW), Progression "If You Believe" (Nervous), Joi Cardwell's "Soul To Bare" (Activ) (1997), Cassio & The Funky People Feat. Amira "What Is Love" (1997), "Love's Here at Last" by Judy Albanese (Maxi) (1997).

MN2S commissioned Disciple to remix the label's first single 'Things We Used To Do" in 1999. His remix of Love Tattoo's "The Bass Has Got Me Movin'" (2001) earned him an ARIA Music Award and a Grammy nomination. "Always Come Back to Your Love" by Samantha Mumba. He collaborated as Nympho Soundz with Steve Mac, his release of 'Filter Groove' appeared on MTV Ibiza 2000 for 'The Party" followed by "Ill Concepts" supported by DJ Dan and Bad Boy Bill. 2002 saw Disciple lean his vocals on "Bass & Treble" with Robbie Rivera featured on Cart Cox's Global Compilation. The duo hit 85 on the UK Singles chart with " Super Drum" DJ Disciple was credited as David Banks for "Here Comes the Morning" (2004) by Barbara Walker; featured in the first 4 minutes of the Hollywood smash The Score with Robert De Niro and Edward Norton.

In the mid-2000s, Artists he collaborated with include Michele Chiavarini as part of D & M Project and Brooklyn Soul Boys, Guida de Palma, Lady Bunny^{.} In 2006 he released "Work It Out" featuring Dawn Tallman on the Catch 22 label. It topped dance club charts, including Buzz and Cool Cuts, making it a commercial success. and was re-released by Klaas for House Trained Records in 2008 with remixes It was played on BBC Radio 1 by Pete Tong and its music video marked Dj Disciple debut on MTV.

The song "Changes" was a collaboration with David Tort and DJ Ruff and appeared on the Beatport digital top three downloads for two months. The video for "Sexy Lady", which he produced with Javi Mula, received The Best 'Dance ClipVideo' in Spain. In 2008, he and David Tort collaborated on the song "Rise Up", which appeared on the Máxima FM playlist. That March, he was nominated for Beatport Best House Artist and played at the Winter Music Conference BBC Radio 1 Pool Party in Miami. Disciple's music has appeared on The Hill,Paris Hilton's book The memoirs, Uncloudy Days, The Gospel Music Encyclopedia, Harold Heaths Long Relationships, and The Virgin Encyclopedia of 90s music. In 2011, Pioneer Electronics approached him to write a promotional song for their new portable player, the Steez, resulting in the song "U Know My Steez."

In 2012, Disciple collaborated with Albert Neve, Dru Hepkins and Norykko on Romper Room.

==== Collaborations with dancers and party motivators ====
Disciple collaborated with dancers and party motivators. Disciple first met Collette McLafferty, author of Confessions of a Bad, Ugly Singer when she responded to his Craigslist post in 2005, dancing for him at Webster Hall, Cielo, and Le Souk. Disciple and Mclafferty collaborated in the 2017 single "Birdseye View" after her lawsuit with the Pink Tribute band.Joy Villa, another performer who responded to Disciple's Craigslist ad, danced with him at clubs like Le Souk, and the Coffee Cave in Jersey.

== Activism ==
Every year during Thanksgiving The Next Level Party, alongside Eric Blackwell, hosts DJs Against Hunger event that feeds the homeless. With extraordinary talent beside him, canned goods would be distributed where homeless victims would eat each year. In response to George Floyd's murder, Disciple also protested in the streets of Brooklyn and released a version of "Rise Up" in 2020 (Justice For George Floyd)

Downtown Brooklyn parents were recently informed that a neighborhood staple, the Navy Yard Madison Boys & Girls Club, has filed for bankruptcy protection under Chapter 11 and will be closing at the end of the school year. Many of the kids attending the Navy Yard Clubhouse come from the nearby NYCHA Farragut Houses. The clubhouse is directly across the street from Farragut, which made it a convenient location for parents to pick up their children. The imminent closure of the clubhouse and the sale of its building are making families desperate to find some way to either put the clubhouse building into the hands of a different nonprofit or have the city step in to save it for the community. Disciple reached out to Amsterdam News to raise the alarm about the situation.

== Writing ==
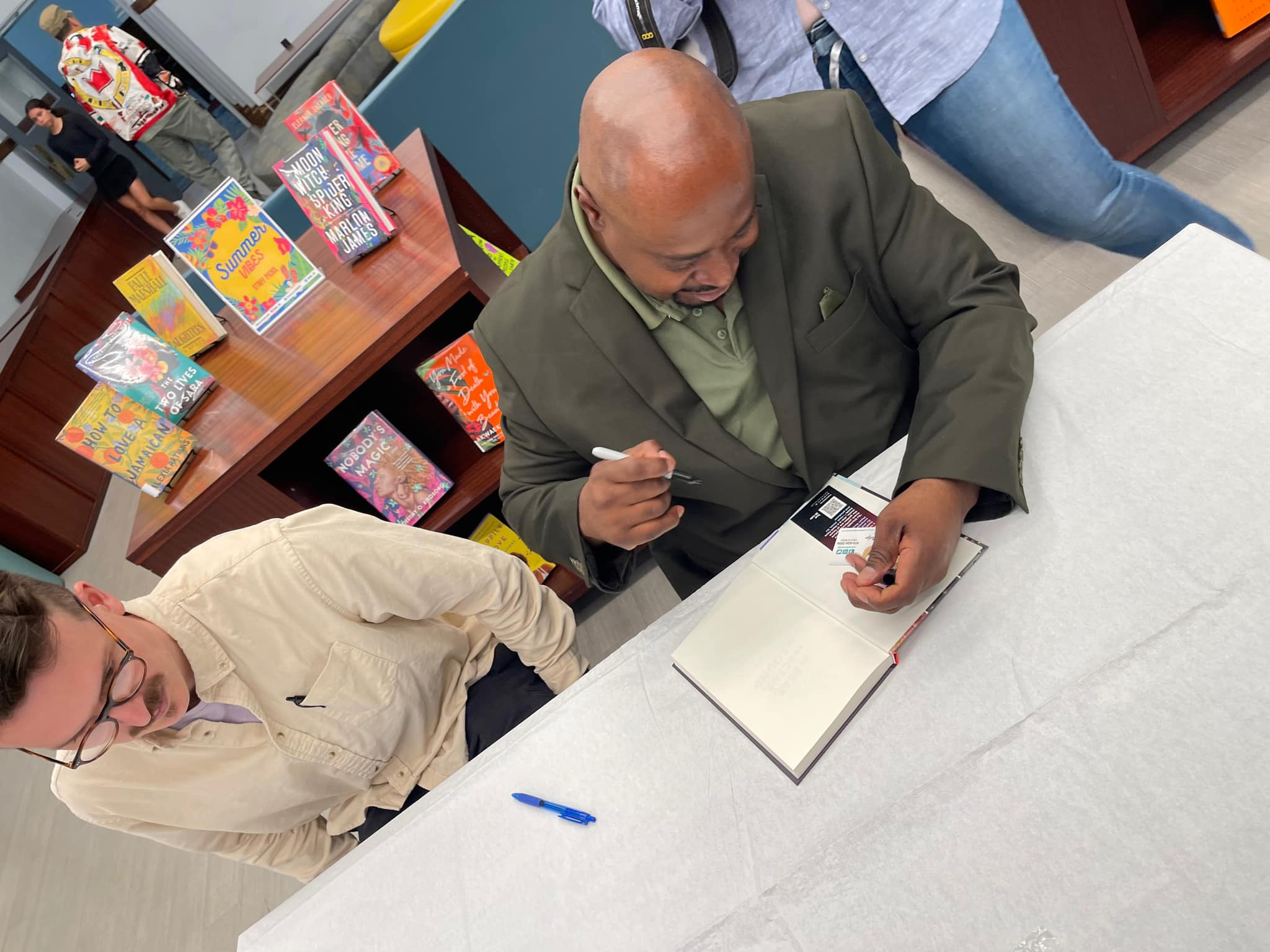
June 2023 Henry Kronk and DJ Disciple at The Newark Public Library book launch.

On June 15, 2023, The Beat, the Scene, the Sound: A DJ's Journey through the Rise, Fall, and Rebirth of House Music in New York City, a book written by DJ Disciple and journalist Henry Kronk, was released by Rowman & Littlefield. It covers club and street culture between the demise of disco and the rise of EDM. The book gives us firsthand information on how the crack cocaine epidemic, the HIV/AIDS crisis and external forces impacted NYC and the music scene.

== Personal life ==
Banks married Amber Daniels in 2011. They have one daughter, Julia, and divorced in 2016. Disciple was on an airplane that nearly crashed which changed his whole outlook on life.When COVID-19 happened he was the drummer at The Church Of The Open Door participating in funeral services to celebrate the homegoings of so many people that passed away. In 2021 Banks was awarded "Parent Of The Year". During the 2022 Farragut – Fort Greene reunion, an event that brings communities together, David Banks was awarded the Mary Andrews 'Above & Beyond' plaque for community work.

== Selected discography ==
=== Albums ===
- Sounds You Can Feel Volume 1 (2020)
- Sounds You Can Feel Volume 2 (2020)
- Full Circle (2021)
- Grateful 24/7/365 (2022)
- Harmonies (2023)

=== Singles and EPs ===
- 1993: "When the Music Stops" (D:vision Records)
- 1994: "On the Dancefloor" (Mother Records)
- 1994: "The Soul Party Project" (Grassroots Records)
- 1995: "I'll Do Anything" - DJ Disciple presents Innervisions feat. Dawn Tallman (Smack)
- 1995: Street Experience (Volume #2) (Muzik Pushers)
- 1997: The 12 Steps 2 Heaven E.P. (Narcotic Records)
- 1998: "Takin' It Back" - RIP feat. DJ Disciple (In' Sync)
- 1999: "Wannabe" - Taka Boom (Catch 22 Recordings)
- 2000: "It's Easy" (Azuli Records)
- 2002: "Fantasy Reality" - Cyn
- 2002: "Super Drum" - Robbie Rivera feat. DJ Disciple (Azuli Records)
- 2002: "Yes" (Catch 22 Recordings)
- 2003: "Satisfied" (Catch 22 Recordings)
- 2004: The NYC Sampler Sessions (Catch 22 Recordings)
- 2005: "I Get High" (Catch 22 Recordings)
- 2006: "Deep Underground / Crossroads" - DJ Disciple, David Tort & DJ Ruff (Catch 22 Recordings)
- 2006: "Work It Out" feat. Dawn Tallman (Catch 22 Recordings)
- 2007: "Changes" - David Tort, Ruff & DJ Disciple (Vendetta Records)
- 2009: "Big Beautiful Women (Watch Out for the Big Girls)"
- 2009: "When I Die" - DJ Disciple & Dru Hepkins (Net's Work International)
- 2010: "Can You Handle This" - Emily Angel and DJ Disciple
- 2011: "Jasmin Garden" - Stefan Vilijn & DJ Disciple
- 2011: "Whole World Party" feat. Dawn Tallman
- 2012: "Drop It Down" feat. Tyra Juliette
- 2012: "It's Your Night (Let the Beat Rock)" - D.E.M feat. DJ Disciple & Dru Hepkins
- 2012: "Romper Room" - Albert Neve feat. DJ Disciple, Dru Hepkins & Norykko
- 2012: "U Know My Steez" - Jan & Solo feat. DJ Disciple
- 2013: "It's Your Night, Let the Beat Rock" - D.E.M, DJ Disciple & Dru Hepkins
- 2014: "Turn It Around (Willy William Remix)" feat. Michelle Weeks
- 2017: "Birdseye View (Juloboy Remix)" feat. Collette McLafferty
- 2018: "Courage and Sacrifice"
- 2019: "Lose Yourself" feat. David Mason
- 2020: "Feels So Good Living the Life You Love" feat. TheRealShakar
- 2021: "My Sweet Self" feat. AMORELLE
- 2022: "Rescue Me" feat. Harmonies
- 2022: "Reality Check"
- 2023: "Street Music" - Trimtone & DJ Disciple

=== DJ mixes ===
- 1996: Freeze Club Mixer Volume 6: DJ Disciple Megamix '96 (CD, Comp, Mixed) (Freeze Records)
- 1998: Maxi Records Presents House Disciples - A DJ Disciple Mix (CD, Comp, Mixed) (Maxi Records)
- 1999: New York City 100% Dance Volume 2 International House Vibes (CD, Comp, Mixed) (Master Dance Tones UK)
- 2000: Selections (CD, Comp, Mixed) (Northcott Productions Ltd.)
- 2001: Trust The DJ - DJ Disciple Volume 1
- 2004: Uploaded Volume 1 (Seamless Recordings)
- 2005: Various, Red Lite Series 2
- 2009: Addicted To DJ Disciple And Baggi Begovic

Preceded by "Can't Get You Out of My Head" by Kylie Minogue	"Caught Up"; Billboard Hot Dance Club Play number-one single February 16, 2002	Succeeded by "You Got Me (Burnin' Up)" by Funky Green Dogs
