= U.D.A.U.F.L. =

Dance Music Acts

U.D.A.U.F.L. is the acronym for Underground Dance Artists United For Life, a collaboration of Dance music acts put together by the producer duo known as Blaze.

The acts that make up this project are Kenny Bobien, Joi Cardwell, Arnold Jarvis, Ultra Nate, Byron Stingily, Barbara Tucker, Dawn Tallman, Michelle Weeks, Darryl D'Bonneau, Sabrynaah Pope, Stephanie Cooke and Keith Thompson [(Joe Adams)].

In 2005, the project, along with Tucker and Blaze, scored a number-one track on the Billboard Hot Dance Music/Club Play chart with "Most Precious Love". This would be Pope's last song that she would record as part of the project (as one of the backing chorus vocals) before her death on September 24, 2005.

== See also ==
- List of number-one dance hits (United States)
- List of artists who reached number one on the US Dance chart
