= Love Vibrations =

Single by Barbara Tucker

from the album Love Vibrations
- Released: 2007
- Recorded: 2007
- Genre: House; dance-pop
- Length: 4:10
- Label: BStar
- Songwriter: Barbara Tucker
- Producers: Barbara Tucker; Love House Productions

Barbara Tucker singles chronology
"Most Precious Love" (2005)	"Love Vibrations" (2007)	"One" (2009)

"Love Vibrations" is a 2007 song written, produced and recorded by American singer Barbara Tucker, and her first single to be released from her first full-length album of the same name. This was Tucker's seventh number-one single she placed on the Billboard Hot Dance Club Play chart, reaching the top spot on October 6, 2007.

== Track listing ==
CD Maxi (US)

- Love Vibrations (Georgie's Radio Mix) 4:10
- Love Vibrations (Josh Harris' Radio Mix) 3:56
- Love Vibrations (DJ Escape & Johnny Vicious Radio Edit) 3:49
- Love Vibrations (Georgie's Love Club Mix) 7:56
- Love Vibrations (Josh Harris' Club Mix) 7:30
- Love Vibrations (DJ Escape & Johnny Vicious Main Mix) 9:22
- Love Vibrations (Supernova Elektricity Mix) 9:51
- Love Vibrations (Feliciano Classic Mix) 6:46
- Love Vibrations (Love House Original) 8:03
- Love Vibrations (Supernova Dub Mix) 9:28
