= Up (ABC album) =

Studio album by ABC
- Released: 16 October 1989
- Recorded: 1988–1989
- Studio: Marcus Studios and Sarm West Studios (London, UK)
- Genre: House
- Length: 44:41
- Label: PolyGram; Phonogram; Neutron; Mercury
- Producer: Mark White; Martin Fry; Blaze

ABC chronology
Alphabet City (1987)	Up (1989)	Absolutely (1990)

Singles from Up
- 1. "One Better World" Released: 15 May 1989; 2. "The Real Thing" Released: 11 September 1989

Professional ratings
Review scores
Source	Rating
AllMusic	2/5 stars
The Encyclopedia of Popular Music	3/5 stars
New Musical Express	7/10
Record Mirror	4/5 stars
The Rolling Stone Album Guide	3/5 stars
Spin Alternative Record Guide	2/10

Up is the fifth studio album by the English pop band ABC, released in October 1989. This time experimenting with house music, it was ABC's first album not to make the top 40 in the UK. However, they scored a minor UK hit with the single "One Better World", an ode to love, peace and tolerance. "The Real Thing" was also released as a single. Up was the band's final album released on the PolyGram label.

In 2005, a digitally remastered CD of the album was released with five bonus tracks.

== Track listing ==
All tracks are written by Martin Fry and Mark White, except where noted.

Side one
No.	Title	Writer(s)	Length
1.	"Never More Than Now"	Martin Fry; Mark White; David Clayton	6:02
2.	"The Real Thing"		4:52
3.	"One Better World"		5:45
4.	"Where Is the Heaven?"		6:25

Side two
No.	Title	Length
5.	"The Greatest Love of All"	5:33
6.	"North"	5:39
7.	"I'm in Love With You"	4:33
8.	"Paper Thin"	5:52
Total length:		44:41

Additional tracks on initial CD pressing
No.	Title	Length
9.	"One Better World" (Pickering-Park Mix)	4:23
10.	"The Greatest Love of All" (Kraushaar Mix)	5:50
11.	"Never More Than Now" (Kraushaar Mix)	5:56

Additional tracks on 2005 version
No.	Title	Length
9.	"One Better World" (Pickering Park Mix)	6:33
10.	"One Better World" (Percapella Mix)	4:00
11.	"The Real Thing" (Frankie Knuckles Due Mix)	5:18
12.	"The Greatest Love of All" (May Day Mix)	6:06
13.	"Paper Thin" (1986 Demo)	6:23

== Personnel ==
ABC

- Martin Fry – vocals
- Mark White – keyboards, programming

Additional personnel

- Dave Clayton – keyboards
- Ritchie Close – keyboards
- Mike Pickering – keyboards, programming and DJ (9)
- Rob Dean – guitars
- Maurice Michael – guitars, backing vocals
- Danny Cummings – drums, percussion
- David Palmer – drums, percussion
- Phil Smith – saxophones
- Graeme Park – DJ (9)
- Alan Carvell – backing vocals
- Lorenza Johnson – backing vocals

== Production ==
- Martin Fry – producer
- Mark White – producer
- Blaze – additional production (3, 9)
- Mark Stent – engineer (1, 3–11)
- Bob Kraushaar – mixing (1, 2, 4–8), engineer (2), remixing (10, 11)
- Julian Mendelsohn – mixing (3)
- Graeme Park – remixing (9)
- Mike Pickering – remixing (9)
- Tim Burrell – assistant engineer
- Ian Cooper – mastering at Townhouse Studios (London, UK)
- ABC – sleeve design
- Design KB – sleeve design
- Paul Cox – photography
- Bennett Freed – management

== Charts ==
Chart (1989)	Peak position
German Albums (Offizielle Top 100)	38
UK Albums Chart	58
