= Stay Together (Barbara Tucker song) =

Single by Barbara Tucker
- Released: 1995
- Recorded: 1995
- Genre: Garage/Deep House
- Length: 4:06
- Label: Strictly Rhythm Records (US); Positiva Records (UK); Quality Records (Canada); EMI Records (Australia); ZYX Records (Germany)
- Songwriters: Bert Reid; Louie Vega
- Producer: "Little" Louie Vega

Barbara Tucker singles chronology
"I Get Lifted" (1994)	"Stay Together" (1995)	"Keep on Lovin' You" (1996)

"Stay Together" is a gospel-inspired house song recorded by American singer Barbara Tucker and written and produced by "Little" Louie Vega. Released in 1995 by Strictly Rhythm Records, this would be Tucker's third of seven number-one singles she would place on the US Billboard Hot Dance Club Play chart, reaching the top spot on November 11, 1995. On the UK Singles Chart, the single peaked at 46, while peaking at number 75 in Scotland.

== Critical reception ==
Larry Flick from Billboard magazine wrote, "The enduring Barbara Tucker is back in action with "Stay Together", her third single for New York's Strictly Rhythm Records. This is a tasty all-star package, with production by "Little" Louie Vega and Kenny "Dope" Gonzalez and remixes by Armand Van Helden." He added, "Tucker sounds downright seductive here, which is a nice change from the pulpit-pounding of her last two singles, 'Beautiful People' and 'I Get Lifted'. Do not be fooled, though: Tucker stays positive at all times, never passing up the opportunity to spread her own brand of joy whenever possible."

James Hamilton from British magazine Music Week's RM Dance Update described the song as a "diva wailed garage strider". Bethan Cole from NME commented, "Big stiletto-stomping club tune it ain't, but arch-diva Ms Tucker and Master at Work Louie Vega construct a full-bodied, pumped-up garage groove devoid of unnecessary embellishment, with a kicking Frankie Feliciano mix to boot."

== Track listings ==
- CD maxi (US)
1. "Stay Together" (Radio Mix) 4:00
2. "Stay Together" (Soulful Mix) 8:27
3. "Stay Together" (G-Funk Mix) 4:42
4. "Stay Together" (Funky Piano Mix) 8:40
5. "Stay Together" (Greed's Euphoric Edit Mix) 6:05
6. "Stay Together" (Original Vocal Mix) 6:45
7. "Stay Together" (Feliciano Broken "Edit" Mix) 6:15
8. "Stay Together" (Armand's Crazy Trauma Mix) 13:00
9. "Stay Together" (The Ravin' Mix) 7:25

== Charts ==
=== Weekly charts ===
Chart (1995)	Peak position
Scotland (OCC)	75
UK Singles (Official Charts)	46
UK Dance (Official Charts)	3
US Dance Club Songs (Billboard)	1
US Maxi-Singles Sales (Billboard)	9

=== Year-end charts ===
Chart (1995)	Position
UK Club Chart (Music Week)	67
