= King Without a Crown =

King Without a Crown may refer to:

- "King Without a Crown" (Matisyahu song), 2005
- "King Without a Crown" (ABC song), 1987
