= Hideaway (De'Lacy song) =

1994 single by De'Lacy

- 1995 UK CD single

Single by De'Lacy
- B-side: "Remix"
- Released: 1995
- Genre: House; Deep house (Deep Dish mix)
- Length: 3:32 (Deep Dish radio edit); 4:06 (extended Deep Dish radio edit); 11:56 (Deep Dish remix); 5:48 (original mix)
- Label: Easy Street; deConstruction/BMG
- Songwriters: Kevin Hedge; Josh Milan
- Producer: Blaze

De'Lacy singles chronology
"Hideaway" (1995)	"That Look" (1996)

Music video
- "Hideaway" on YouTube

"Hideaway" is a song by American house music group De'Lacy, featuring vocals by Rainie Lassiter. It is the group's most successful single and is written by Kevin Hedge and Josh Milan, produced by Blaze and released by labels Easy Street and deConstruction/BMG. The 1995 Deep Dish remix peaked at number-one in Italy. It also reached number nine in the UK and number 38 on the Billboard Hot Dance Club Play chart in the US. A music video was made for the Deep Dish remix, featuring Lassiter performing on locations in New York City. The song has been remixed and re-released several times. A remixed version, called "Hideaway 1998", which featured a mix by Nu‑Birth, peaked at number 21 in 1998 in the UK. The song was released a third time in 2006 and reached number 82 in the Netherlands.

In 2022, British disc jockey and BBC Radio 1 host Pete Tong teamed up with Eats Everything (aka Daniel Pearce) to deliver a spin on "Hideaway", giving it a stylish twist. It was featured on the album Pete’s Everything Club Rub, which was made available via Ministry of Sound.

== Background and release ==
"Hideaway" was originally released by Easy Street Records, one of the longest-established house-music labels in the US. It became one of the most talked about records at the 1995 Popkomm event and was picked up by Jim Ingles, A&R manager at Kickin subsidiary Slip'N'Slide Records. The production was handled by New York production team Blaze and remixes by electronic music duo Deep Dish, consisting of Ali "Dubfire" Shirazinia and Sharam Tayebi, were made. Slip'N'Slide felt these mixes were so good and so strong, that they decided to release "Hideaway" as a 12-inch double pack, an unusual move by the label. However, to capitalize on the record's success, and to comply with singles chart restrictions, the track listing were reorganized so the track could be released as a 12-inch single and thus qualify for a chart placing. After it crossed over from the Club Chart Top 10 into the UK Singles Charts at number nine, other European and Asian territories were picking it up. Polydor Records in Benelux made it a priority record.

Slip'N'Slide label manager Max told in an interview with Music Week, "I met Deep Dish in New York and heard their work on Quench and I was raving about it. Coincidentally, Jim had heard a Deep Dish mix of Joi Cardwell's "Trouble" at somebody's house, and loved it. He said a Deep Dish mix would be perfect for De'Lacy and he sorted it out."

== Chart performance ==
"Hideaway" was a major hit on the charts in Europe and remains the group's most successful song. It peaked at number-one in Italy in September 1996, with three weeks at the top spot. In the United Kingdom, "Hideaway" debuted and peaked at number nine on the UK Singles Chart, on August 27, 1995. It spent two weeks at that position and ten weeks in total within the chart. On the UK Dance Chart, it was an even bigger hit, peaking at number-one. Additionally, the single was a top-20 hit in Ireland (17), as well as on the Eurochart Hot 100, where it hit number 12 on September 9. "Hideaway" was also a top-30 hit in Iceland (28) and the Netherlands (23). Outside Europe, it was successful in Israel, peaking at number eight on October 17, 1995. In the US, it went to number 38 on the Billboard Hot Dance Club Play chart.

== Critical reception ==
Larry Flick from Billboard magazine praised the song as "flawless" and "uplifting". David Bennun from The Guardian complimented it as "stunning". British electronic dance and clubbing magazine Mixmag named it "an orgasmic club moment." The magazine later stated that "its irresistible blend of floaty production and Rainie Lassiter’s soul-stirring vocal makes for an otherworldly, spiritual experience - with just the right amount of kick to ignite a club." Maria Jimenez from Music & Media wrote that De'Lacy "is set to take over Europe with the stompin' houser 'Hideway'. Beguiling female vocals, deep bass sways, catchy percussion and anticipatory hesitance add up to a winner of a track." Music Week's RM Dance Update described it as "a superb Blaze production with booming underground mixes from Deep Dish".

RM editor Tim Jeffery gave it top score, rating it five out of five, writing, "Licensed from Easy Street with a typically smooth and pleasant Blaze production, it would be easy to think this is just another quality US garage track, but the real action starts with the Deep Dish remixes. A thunderous kick and snare drum rhythm with warm organ chords and swooping synths complement the vocals perfectly and turn this into an epic, powerful and genuinely original piece of American house. Tough and extremely moving, this will be a huge club hit and it deserves to be a lot more." In his weekly RM dance column, James Hamilton noted the "mesmeric sombre unhurried chugging jiggly progressive long 121.8-122.2bpm Deep Dish Remix". Calvin Bush from Muzik stated that "hotter than tickets for Tyson's comeback (and about 6.23 times longer thanks to Deep Dish's extremely awesome mix), 'Hideaway' has the rare ability to hold its own in both the underground and commercial market places."

== Impact and legacy ==
British DJ on Kiss 102 Manchester, Matt Thompson told Melody Maker in July 1995, "Deep Dish's remix is the one, I think it's incredible, really. I'm not somebody who plays a lot of vocal tunes but, this year, I've been able to drop in one or two, which is really good to break up a set and, for a change, there's been some quality vocal tunes coming out and this is one of them. It's really deep. When I play house, I play in a deep, trancey, dreamy style and this has got these amazing sub-bass sounds on it and it's just brilliantly put together really." NME's dance column Vibes ranked "Hideaway" number four in their list of "Singles of the Year" in December 1995.

Music critic Tom Ewing said that "Hideaway" was probably his "favourite single of 1995." The song is featured in Grand Theft Auto: Liberty City Stories on the in-game dance station Rise FM. Mixmag ranked it 2nd in their list of 'The Greatest Songs of 1995', whilst Face ranked it 21st. In 1996, Mixmag ranked the song at number 52 in their list of 'The 100 Best Dance Singles of All Time', and they also nominated the song for their 'Greatest Dance Track of All Time' title in 2012. The Guardian featured the song on their 'A History of Modern Music: Dance' in 2011. Tomorrowland included "Hideaway" in their official list of "The Ibiza 500" in 2020. Classic Pop ranked it number 40 in their list of the top 40 dance tracks from the 90's in 2022.

=== Accolades ===
Year	Publisher	Country	Accolade	Rank
1995	NME	United Kingdom	"Vibes: Singles of the Year"	4
1996	Mixmag	United Kingdom	"The 100 Best Dance Singles of All Time"	52
1998	DJ Magazine	United Kingdom	"Top 100 Club Tunes"	10
2004	IDJ	United States	"The 50 Greatest Dance Singles"	28
2011	The Guardian	United Kingdom	"A History of Modern Music: Dance"	*
2011	MTV Dance	United Kingdom	"The 100 Biggest 90's Dance Anthems Of All Time"	42
2018	Mixmag	United Kingdom	"The 30 Best Vocal House Anthems Ever"	*
2019	Mixmag	United Kingdom	"The 20 Best New Jersey House Records"	*
2022	Classic Pop	United Kingdom	"90s Dance – The Essential Playlist"	40

(*) indicates the list is unordered.

== Track listings ==
- 12-inch single, US (1994)
1. "Hideaway" (Klub Head's Hideout) — 5:45
2. "Hideaway" (Klubhouse) — 5:15
3. "Hideaway" (Klub Head's Dub-A-Way) — 4:24
4. "Hideaway" (Klub Dub It) — 3:17
5. "Hideaway" (Radio Edit) — 3:38
- 12-inch single, UK (1995)
1. "Hideaway" (Deep Dish Remix) — 11:51
2. "Hideaway" (Dubfire Needs To Score) — 9:46
3. "Hideaway" (K-Klass Klub Mix) — 9:08
- CD single, UK (1995)
1. "Hideaway" (Deep Dish Radio Mix) — 3:29
2. "Hideaway" (K Klass Radio Mix) — 3:22
3. "Hideaway" (Deep Dish Mix) — 11:53
4. "Hideaway" (K Klass Klub Mix) 9:08
5. "Hideaway" (Dubfire Needs To Score) — 9:46
- CD maxi, Europe (1995)
1. "Hideaway" (Deep Dish Radio Edit) — 3:27
2. "Hideaway" (Deep Dish Remix) — 11:49
3. "Hideaway" (Dubfire Needs To Score) — 9:45

== Charts ==
=== Weekly charts ===
Chart (1995)	Peak position
Belgium (Ultratop)	36
Europe (Eurochart Hot 100)	12
Europe (European Dance Radio)	10
Iceland (Íslenski Listinn Topp 40)	28
Ireland (IRMA)	17
Israel (Israeli Singles Chart)	8
Italy (Musica e dischi)	1
Netherlands (Dutch Top 40)	27
Netherlands (Single Top 100)	23
Scotland (OCC)	9
UK Singles (Official Charts)	9
UK Dance (OCC)	1
UK Airplay (Music Week)	16
US Hot Dance Club Play (Billboard)	38

Chart (1998)	Peak position
Europe (Eurochart Hot 100)	70
Scotland (OCC)	32
UK Singles (OCC)	21
UK Dance (OCC)	3

Chart (2002)	Peak position
UK Dance (OCC)	15

Chart (2003)	Peak position
UK Dance (OCC)	28

Chart (2005)	Peak position
Scotland (OCC)	100
UK Singles (OCC)	69
UK Dance (OCC)	16
UK Independent Singles (OCC)	15

Chart (2006)	Peak position
Netherlands (Single Top 100)	82
Scotland (OCC)	72
UK Singles (OCC)	95
UK Dance (OCC)	21

Chart (2008)	Peak position
UK Singles (OCC)	99

Chart (2026)	Peak position
UK Singles (OCC)	28
UK Vinyl Singles (OCC)	25

=== Year-end charts ===
Chart (1995)	Position
Europe (European Dance Radio)	11
UK Singles (OCC)	76
UK Club Chart (Music Week)	8

== Cover versions, samples and remixes ==
The group Sol Brothers sampled "Hideaway" in their song "That Elvis Track" in 1997.

British DJ and production duo Hoxton Whores covered "Hideaway" in 2003.

Barefoot covered "Hideaway" on the 2005 single "It's Like That/Hideaway".

David Morales collaborated with Blondewearingblack in 2018 to release a cover on his own DIRIDIM label.

British duo Tough Love featuring Reigns covered the song in 2018.
