= The Night You Murdered Love =

Single by ABC

from the album Alphabet City
- B-side: "Minneapolis"
- Released: 24 August 1987
- Recorded: 1987
- Studio: Marcus Recording Studios (London)
- Genre: Sophisti-pop; blue-eyed soul
- Length: 4:53
- Label: Mercury; Neutron; PolyGram; Vertigo
- Songwriters: Martin Fry; Mark White
- Producers: Martin Fry; Mark White; Bernard Edwards

ABC singles chronology
"When Smokey Sings" (1987)	"The Night You Murdered Love" (1987)	"King Without a Crown" (1988)

Music video
- "The Night You Murdered Love" on YouTube

"The Night You Murdered Love" is a song by the English band ABC, released in August 1987 by Mercury as the second single from their fourth studio album, Alphabet City (1987). It peaked at No. 31 on the UK singles chart.

== Music video ==
The music video shows a homicidal fashion model carrying a slingshot and a skateboard stalking the band across the city of Paris.

== Critical reception ==
Jerry Smith of British magazine Music Week described "The Night You Murdered Love" a "glamorous and dramatic number" and noted "its Chic-style funky guitar and sweeping strings". In a review published in Smash Hits, Sylvia Patterson described the song as being "desperately dreary, flimsily tinkling, half-hearted puff of a record that makes you want to be instantly sick on Martin Fry's expensive breeks".

== Track listing ==
7" single

1. "The Night You Murdered Love" – 4:53
2. "Minneapolis" – 2:57

US 12" single

- A1 "The Night You Murdered Love" (Sheer Chic Mix) – 6:31

Mixed by – The Funky Sisters, Pete Hammond

- A2 "Minneapolis" – 2:57
- B1 "The Night You Murdered Love" (The Whole Story) – 8:14

Rap [Featuring] – Contessa Lady V

- B2 "The Night You Murdered Love" (The Reply) – 4:50

Rap [Featuring] – Contessa Lady V

- B3 "The Night You Murdered Love" (Bonus Beats) – 4:53

== Charts ==
=== Weekly charts ===
Weekly-chart performance for "The Night You Murdered Love"
Chart (1987)	Peak position
Belgium (Ultratop 50 Flanders)	17
Ireland (IRMA)	14
Italy Airplay (Music & Media)	1
Netherlands (Single Top 100)	9
New Zealand (Recorded Music NZ)	20
UK Singles (OCC)	31
UK Dance (Music Week)	17
US Billboard Dance/Club Play Songs Chart	3
US Billboard Hot Dance Music/Maxi-Singles Sales Chart	33
West Germany (GfK)	20
