= Stop Playing with My Mind =

"Stop Playing With My Mind"

Single by Barbara Tucker featuring Darryl D'Bonneau
- Released: 6 March 2000
- Recorded: 1999
- Genre: Diva house; funky house
- Length: 3:36
- Label: Strictly Rhythm Records
- Songwriter(s): D.J. Freddy Turner; Jason "Whiplash" Hernandez
- Producer(s): D.J. Freddy Turner; Jason "Whiplash" Hernandez

Barbara Tucker featuring Darryl D'Bonneau singles chronology
"Everybody Dance (The Horn Song)" (1998)	"Stop Playing With My Mind" (2000)	"Love's On Time" (2000)

"Stop Playing With My Mind" is a 2000 house song recorded by American singer Barbara Tucker (billed as "Ms. Barbara Tucker") featuring singer Darryl D'Bonneau, written and produced by D.J. Freddy Turner and Jason "Whiplash" Hernandez. The track sampled the 1979 Disco song "Mainline" by Black Ivory. This was Tucker's fifth of seven number-one singles she placed on the Billboard Dance Club Songs, reaching the top spot on March 11, 2000. On the UK Chart, the single peaked at 17 in 2000.

== Track listing ==
CD Maxi (US)

- Stop Playing With My Mind (Whiplash & Turner Radio Edit) 3:36
- Stop Playing With My Mind (Whiplash & Turner Vocal Mix) 9:24
- Stop Playing With My Mind (Full Intention Club Mix) 7:00
- Stop Playing With My Mind (Full Intention Dub Mix) 5:13
- Stop Playing With My Mind (Artful Dodger Vocal Mix) 6:14
- Stop Playing With My Mind (Artful Dodger Dark Dub) 6:00
