= In Mortal Hands =

2009 book by Stephanie Cooke

- Author: Stephanie Cooke
- Subject: Atomic Age
- Publisher: Bloomsbury (US); Black Inc (Aus)
- Publication date: 2009
- Pages: 488 pp.
- ISBN: 978-1-59691-617-3
- OCLC: 243544172
- Dewey Decimal: 909.82/5
- LC Class: D445 .C7355 2009

In Mortal Hands: A Cautionary History of the Nuclear Age is a 2009 book by Stephanie Cooke. The book explains why nuclear energy failed to develop in the way its planners hoped, and explores the relationship between the military and civilian sides of nuclear energy. In the book, Cooke argues that we are not close to solving the nuclear waste problem, and that "the billions spent by government on nuclear over the past sixty years crowded out other energy options". The book suggests that there are practical reasons why nuclear reactors are unlikely to provide a solution to the global climate change problem.

In Mortal Hands has been the subject of several media interviews with Cooke.

Stephanie Cooke has written about the nuclear industry since the 1980s. She is currently an editor for the Energy Intelligence Group publication, Nuclear Intelligence Weekly and is a contributor to the Bulletin of the Atomic Scientists.

== See also ==
- List of books about nuclear issues
- Nuclear power debate
