= Blaze (group) =

American house music group

Blaze is an American house music group formed in New Jersey in 1984.

== History ==
The group was formed by Josh Milan, Kevin Hedge and Chris Herbert, when Herbert introduced Milan, a member of his church choir, to Hedge, his childhood friend. Herbert was the one who left the group in 1991, leaving Milan and Hedge to carry on working together.

The group's output consists mainly of house music songs. When the group started, Herbert was the singer, with Milan playing the piano, and Hedge on production. After Herbert left, both Hedge and Milan started to share production duties, vocals, and playing most of the instruments of the group's tracks and albums. The group achieved fame with its remix of Lisa Stansfield's "People Hold On" in 1989, after signing with Motown/MCA Records.

Blaze released its debut album, 25 Years Later in 1990, after which Herbert decided to move to a more R&B-oriented career, while the two remaining members invested in the emerging house-music culture, opening a nightclub called Shelter. In 1994, the group scored its first big international production success with De'Lacy's "Hideaway", which was later remixed by Deep Dish.

Since then, Blaze released three more albums, alongside a few scattered compilations of earlier productions and works and countless singles. The group also began working with other well-known names such as "Little" Louie Vega, Barbara Tucker, Jody Watley, and Full Intention. The group is best known to modern audiences by its singles featuring Palmer Brown on vocals, the oft-remixed "My Beat", and the tribute anthem "I Remember House". Blaze's most recent album, released in 2005, is a mix compilation titled Found Love.

== Discography ==
=== Albums ===
- 1990 25 Years Later
- 1994 6 Hubert St.
- 1997 Basic Blaze
- 1999 Productions
- 1999 The Many Colours of Blaze
- 1999 Pure Blaze
- 2001 Pure Blaze 2
- 2001 Natural Blaze (as James Toney Jr. Project)
- 2002 Best of Blaze
- 2002 Spiritually Speaking
- 2004 The Instrumentals Project
- 2004 Keep Hope Alive (as Underground Dance Artists United for Life)
- 2004 Spiritually Speaking – Then and Now
- 2007 The Best of Blaze Vol 1. (The Motown Years)
- 2007 The Best of Blaze Vol 2 (Hubert Street)
- 2007 The Best of Blaze Vol. 3 (Natural Blaze)
- 2011 House Masters—Blaze

=== Singles and EPs ===
Solo

- 2010 "Til You Go Home" (feat. ChinahBlac)
- 2011 "Your Body"
- 2011 "Stay with Me"
- 2011 "Be Your Freak"
- 2011 "Wish" (with Matthew Bandy)

Blaze

- 1985 "Yearnin'"
- 1986 "Whatcha Gonna Do" (with Colonel Abrams)
- 1987 "If You Should Need a Friend"
- 1988 "Can't Win for Losin'"
- 1990 "So Special" (with Timmy Regisford)
- 1990 "We All Must Live Together"
- 1993 "Why Can't We Live Together" (with Hunter Hayes)
- 1994 "#6 Hubert St."
- 1994 "Live a Happy Life" (with Billy Hope)
- 1994 "Just a Little Different" (with Charlé Bishop)
- 1995 "Happy Day" (with Alexander Hope)
- 1995 The Blaze Tracks EP
- 1995 "Fly Away" (with Alexander Hope)
- 1996 "Love Comes Around" (with Sheila Slappy)
- 1996 The Colour Funky EP (A Music Perspective)
- 1996 Trans-Jazz EP
- 1996 "What Can You Do" (with Alexander Hope)
- 1997 "Feel the Music" (with Alexander Hope)
- 1997 "Lovelee Dae"
- 1998 "Directions" (with Joe Claussell)
- 1998 "Seasons of Love"
- 1998 "My Beat" (with Palmer Brown)
- 1999 "More Than Gold" (with Palmer Brown)
- 1999 "Wishing You Were Here"
- 1999 "Funky People" (with Cassio Ware)
- 2000 "Home Is Where the Heart Is"
- 2000 "My Beat" (re-release) (with Palmer Brown)
- 2001 "Jump 4 Love" (with Palmer Brown)
- 2001 "Shine" (with Palmer Brown)
- 2001 "Paradise" (with Cassio Ware)
- 2002 "A Moment in Time" (with Alexander Hope)
- 2002 "Wonderland" (with Alexander Hope)
- 2002 "When I Fall in Love" (with Tee Alford and Sybil Lynch)
- 2002 "Breathe"
- 2002 "I Remember House" (with Palmer Brown)
- 2002 "How Deep Is Your Love" (with Alexander Hope and Timmy Regisford)
- 2003 "I Think of You" (with Amira)
- 2004 "A Song for Nina (Keep the Faith)"
- 2004 "Found Love"
- 2004 "My Beat (Remixes)" (with Palmer Brown)
- 2004 "I Remember House (Remixes)" (with Palmer Brown)
- 2004 "When I Fall in Love (Remixes)" (with Sybil Lynch)
- 2005 "Gloria's Muse (The Yoga Song)"
- 2005 "Dancing" (with Alexander Hope)
- 2005 "Here with Me"
- 2007 "Lovelee Dae" (OM Remixes)
- 2007 "Listen"
- 2007 "Family"
- 2007 "Force of Nature"
- 2009 "We Are One" (Ian Friday Remixes)
- 2010 "Sacred Sex"
- 2010 "We Are One" (Incl. Kiko Navarro & Ian Friday Mixes)
- 2010 "Cult of Soul"
- 2011 "Lovelee Dae" (Remix Re-Release)

Underground Dance Artists United for Life

- 2003 "Be Yourself" (with Joi Cardwell)
- 2003 "We Are One"
- 2004 "Most Precious Love" (with Barbara Tucker)
- 2005 "Be Yourself (Remixes)" (with Joi Cardwell)
- 2005 "Keep Hope Alive (Remixes)" (with Dawn Tallman)
- 2005 "Most Precious Love (Remixes)" (with Barbara Tucker)
- 2005 "Spread Love" (with Byron Stingily)
- 2005 "Wonderful Place" (with Ultra Naté)
- 2006 "Most Precious Love 2006" (with Barbara Tucker)

Black Rascals

- 1993 "The Piano"
- 1993 "Sympathy"
- 1993 "Keeping My Mind" (with Roger Harris)
- 1993 "So in Love" (with Cassio Ware)
- 1996 "For the Next Time"

Funky People

- 1995 The Blaze Tracks EP (with Cassio Ware, Tee Alford and Allen Jeffrey)
- 1995 "Funky People" (with Cassio Ware and Sabrina Johnston)
- 1996 "Lift Him Up" (with Talipharaoh and Su Su Bobien)
- 1999 "Funky People (Remixes)" (with Cassio Ware and Sabrina Johnston)

The Colour Funky

- 1996 "Peach Melba"
- 1999 "Our Spirit"
- 1999 "Journey"

James Toney Jr. Project

- 2000 "Elevation"
- 2001 "Afro-Groove"
- 2001 "Lovely Ones"
- 2002 "Better Days"

Other aliases

- 1987 "Let's Work It Out" (as Exit)
- 1987 "Sometimes Love" (as In-Sync) (with Jerry Edwards)
- 1988 "Mystery" (as Phase II) (with Jerry Edwards and Vincent Herbert)
- 1988 "Reachin'" (as Phase II) (with Jerry Edwards and Vincent Herbert)
- 1989 "Love Will Find a Way/Blazin'" (as Stardust)
- 1991 "One Kiss" (as Pacha) (with Joey Negro and Debbie French)
- 1993 "Underground" (as System VIII) (with Otis Vick)
- 1995 Klubhead EP (as Klubhead) (with Alexander Hope and Otis Vick)
- 1997 "Heaven (When U Smile)" (as The Walls & Company) (with Simone Jay)
- 1997 "Superstar" (as Project MSC) (with Ce Ce Rogers)
- 1998 Artful Noyz EP (as Blaze Team) (with Tee Alford)
- 1998 Mixed Dimensions EP (as Urban Art Trio) (with Tee Alford)
- 1998 "When I Fall in Love" (as The Klub Family) (with Tee Alford and Sybil Lynch)
- 2000 "When I Fall in Love (Remixes)" (as The Klub Family) (with Tee Alford and Sybil Lynch)
- 2003 "A Better World" (as AgeHa) (with Satoshi Hidaka, Jocelyn Brown and Loleatta Holloway)

=== Productions for other artists ===
- 1988: Michelle Ayers – "Another Lover"
- 1988: LaChandra – "Just Started"
- 1988: Heat – "You Can't Get Away"
- 1988: Anthony & the Camp – "Open (Up Your Heart)"
- 1989: ABC – "One Better World"
- 1989: Cynthia "Cookie" Abrams – "Best Part of Me"
- 1989: Jerry Edwards – "I Am Somebody"
- 1989: Chanelle – "One Man"
- 1989: Tawanna Curry – "Let Me Show You"
- 1989: Sense of Vision – "All My Love"
- 1989: Breed of Motion – "Gotta Dance"
- 1992: Cassio Ware – "Baby Love"
- 1993: Cassio – "Never Thought I'd See You Again"
- 1993: Sabrynaah Pope – "It Works for Me"
- 1993: Althea McQueen – "Changes"
- 1993: Kechia Jenkins – "Goin' Through the Motions"
- 1993: Alexander Hope – "Let the Music Take You"
- 1993: Alexander Hope – "Saturdays"
- 1994: Alexander Hope – "Share"
- 1994: Cassio Ware – "Fantasy", with Sajaeda
- 1994: De'Lacy – "Hideaway"
- 1994: Cookie – "Choose Me"
- 1994: Cookie – "Best Part of Me"
- 1995: Cassio – "Paradise"
- 1995: Alex & Rai – "For the Love of You"
- 1995: Alexander Hope – "Brothers & Sisters"
- 1996: Alexander Hope – "Happy Days"
- 1996: De'Lacy – "That Look"
- 1996: Amira – "Getaway"
- 1996: Amira – "Walk", with Alexander O'Neal
- 1997: Amira – "My Desire"
- 1997: De'Lacy – "All I Need Is Love"
- 1997: Debbie Pender – "Movin' On"
- 1997: Alexander Hope – "Never Can Get Away"
- 1998: De'Lacy – "More"
- 1999: Kathy Brown – "Happy People"
- 2001: Nicci – "Count on Me"
- 2001: Nicci – "When You're Free"
- 2004: Alexander Hope – "Big Mistake"
- 2005: Stephanie Cooke – "Love Will"
- 2005: Stephanie Cooke – "Lovers' Holiday"

=== Appearances ===
- 2000 Louie Vega – "Elements of Life"
- 2002 Louie Vega – "Brand New Day"
- 2004 Louie Vega – "Love Is on the Way"
- 2004 Louie Vega – "Sunshine"
- 2006 Catalan FC & Sven Löve – "All About Love"
- 2006 Louie Vega – "Joshua's Jam"
- 2006 Studio Apartment – "The Rising Sun"
- 2006 Shuya Okino – "Love Is the Key" (produced by Phil Asher)
- 2007 Luisito Quintero – "Love Remains the Same" (produced by Louie Vega)

=== Remixes ===
- 2003: "The Only Thing Missin' (Blaze Vocal Mix)" – Aretha Franklin
- 2007: "Listen" – Dreamgirls soundtrack featuring Beyoncé Knowles
- 2007: "Force of Nature" – Sunshine Anderson
- 2007: "Family" – Dreamgirls soundtrack featuring Jennifer Hudson

== See also ==
- List of Number 1 Dance Hits (United States)
- List of artists who reached number one on the US Dance chart

== Sources ==
- Blaze page on Discogs
- Blaze - The early years (1985-89) incl. productions
- Blaze biography on MAW Records
- Blaze biography on West End Records
- Josh Milan 2012 Audio Interview at Soulinterviews.com
