= Dawn Tallman =

American soul, R&B and gospel singer

- Born: Danbury, Connecticut, U.S.
- Occupation: Singer
- Musical career
- Genres: Soul; R&B; gospel

Dawn Tallman is an American soul, R&B and gospel singer.

== Early life ==
She was born and raised in Danbury, Connecticut, and started singing in church and later on was featured in a great number of R&B and dance recordings. She has cooperated with a great number of recording artists and DJs and made part of various ensemble groups traveling internationally.

== Career ==
She is marketed as "The Queen of Gospel Energy" by her record company.

In 1997, she was featured on "Set My Spirit Free" with Kings Of Tomorrow (K.O.T.), in 1999 in remix of "Wake Up" remixed by Hex Hector and in 2000 in Soulstar Syndicate EP Take Me (Mind, Body & Soul). The song charted on SNEP, the official French Singles Chart.

In 2005, she was part of U.D.A.U.F.L., an acronym for Underground Dance Artists United For Life, a collaboration of Dance music acts put together by the producer duo Blaze.

In 2006, she was featured in DJ Disciple single "Work It Out", released under DJ Disciple's Catch 22 Recordings label, becoming a dance hit record. It was played in Ibiza in 2006, BBC Radio 1 DJ Pete Tong the track appeared on a number of labels and compilations such as Xtravaganza (UK), Blanco Y Negro (Spain), Poole Music (France), Networks (Italy) and United (Belgium). It was a charting hit in Spain. In 2008, "Work It Out" was re-released with remixes by Klass for House Trained Records.

In October 2006, Dawn Tallman released a single through West End Records entitled "Save a Place on the Dance Floor For Me" written by West End Records founder Mel Cheren and Warren Rigg and produced by DJ Gomi.

In 2015, she was featured on Bob Sinclar's "Feel the Vibe" charting in France, Belgium and Italy, as well as going to number one on the US Dance chart.

== Discography ==
=== EPs / Remix albums ===
- 2010: Take Me (Mind, Body & Soul) - Soulstar Syndicate feat. Dawn Tallman
- 2010: It Starts With Us - Beaten Soul feat Dawn Tallman
- 2011: Fearless People - JFortino feat. Dawn Tallman & Heather Leigh West
- 2015: Feel The Vibe (Remixes)- Bob Sinclar feat. Dawn Tallman

=== Singles ===
(charting, selective)

| Year | Single | Credits | Charts | | | |
| Year | Single | Credits | BEL (Vl) Ultratop | BEL (Wa) Ultratip | FR | SPN |
|---|---|---|---|---|---|---|
| 2000 | "Got to Be Real" | The Sunshiners feat. Dawn Tallman | — | — | 66 | — |
| 2008 | "Work It Out" | DJ Disciple feat. Dawn Tallman | — | — | — | 15 |
| 2015 | "Feel the Vibe" | Bob Sinclar feat. Dawn Tallman | 45 (Ultratip) | 34 (Ultratip) | 190 | — |

*Did not appear in the official Belgian Ultratop 50 charts, but rather in the bubbling under Ultratip charts.
