= I Get Lifted =

Single by Barbara Tucker
- Released: 24 October 1994
- Recorded: 1994
- Genre: Garage; deep house
- Length: 3:29
- Label: Strictly Rhythm (US); Positiva (UK)
- Songwriters: Barbara Tucker; Harold Edward Matthews; Ron Carroll; Louie Vega
- Producer: "Little" Louie Vega

Barbara Tucker singles chronology
"Beautiful People" (1994)	"I Get Lifted" (1994)	"Stay Together" (1994)

"I Get Lifted" is a song recorded by American singer and songwriter Barbara Tucker, who co-wrote it with producer Little Louie Vega. It emerged from the New York underground house scene and was released in October 1994 by Strictly Rhythm and Positiva. The song became Tucker's second of seven number-one singles on the US Billboard Hot Dance Club Play chart, reaching the top spot on January 28, 1995. On the UK Singles Chart, the single peaked at 33 in 1995. It was re-released with a new remix package in 2009. In 2025, Billboard magazine ranked "I Get Lifted" number eight in their list of "The 50 Best House Songs of All Time".

== Critical reception ==
Larry Flick from Billboard magazine wrote, "Tucker follows her massive 'Beautiful People' with a similar house mover. She belts words of increased spirituality and unity with earnest conviction, matching the energy of the groove with ease." He added, "The stylistic influence of producer Louie Vega is evident. He weaves a kickin' rhythm base that both DJs and punters will find infectious." Maria Jimenez from Music & Media described it as "another highly charged, positivity track" and "ideal crossover dance music".

Andy Beevers from Music Week gave it a score of four out of five, noting that the singer returns with a "strident garage track". He also stated that "it is destined to be a big clubland tune that could cross over." Ian McCann from NME wrote, "A wannabe garage anthem with a rhythm that's a little undignified to live up to its title. Close, but my hands just didn't quite hit the ceiling." James Hamilton from the Record Mirror Dance Update named it a "gospel cliches inspired diva's 'Little' Louie Vegas produced bounder" in his weekly dance column.

== Track listings ==
- 12 inch (US)

A1. "I Get Lifted" (The Unreleased Mix) – 6:30
A2. "I Get Lifted" (F.O.S. Dream Vocal Mix) – 5:35
B. "I Get Lifted" (Armand's Get Deep Mix) – 9:15

- CD maxi (Australia)
1. "I Get Lifted" (Loveland's High on Life Radio Edit) – 3:29
2. "I Get Lifted" (Original Radio Edit) – 4:16
3. "I Get Lifted" (Boyd Slam the Organ Mix) – 6:34
4. "I Get Lifted" (Loveland's High on Life Mix) – 7:02
5. "I Get Lifted" (Underground Network Mix) – 7:10
6. "I Get Lifted" (Go to Church Mix) – 6:50
- I Get Lifted 2009
1. "I Get Lifted" (Bob Sinclar Remix) – 8:18
2. "I Get Lifted" (David Tort Remix) – 8:26
3. "I Get Lifted" (The Underground Network Mix) – 7:11
4. "I Get Lifted" (Dub Beats) – 5:57
5. "I Get Lifted" (Armand's Lift Me Up Mix) - extra CD track – 7:58
6. "I Get Lifted" (The Bar Dub) - extra CD track – 6:23
7. "I Get Lifted" (Boyd Slams the Organ Mix) - extra CD track – 6:33
8. "I Get Lifted" (Go to Church) - extra CD track – 6:50
9. "I Get Lifted" (XTC Mix) - extra CD track – 3:30

== Charts ==
=== Weekly charts ===
Chart (1994–1995)	Peak position
Canada Dance/Urban (RPM)	30
Scotland (OCC)	79
UK Singles (Official Charts)	33
UK Dance (Official Charts)	2
UK Hip Hop/R&B (Official Charts)	8
UK Club Chart (Music Week)	3
US Dance Club Songs (Billboard)	1

Chart (2007)	Peak position
UK Indie (Official Charts)	38

=== Year-end charts ===
Chart (1994)	Position
UK Club Chart (Music Week)	22
