= Everybody Dance (The Horn Song) =

1998 single by Barbara Tucker

Single by Barbara Tucker featuring The Don
- Released: 1998
- Recorded: 1998
- Genre: Funky house
- Length: 3:49
- Label: Strictly Rhythm Records (US); Postiva/EMI (UK); Festival (Australia)
- Songwriter(s): Barbara Tucker; LaVette Gordon; Nathan Pierre Jones
- Producer(s): DJ Pierre

Barbara Tucker singles chronology
"Bring Your Love" (1997)	"Everybody Dance (The Horn Song)" (1998)	"Stop Playing with My Mind" (2000)

DJ Pierre singles chronology
""The Horn Song" (as The Don)" (1998)	""Everybody Dance (The Horn Song)"" (1998)

"Everybody Dance" ("Everybody Dance (The Horn Song)" in international releases) is a 1998 house song recorded by American singer Barbara Tucker, who co-wrote the track with LaVette Gordon, and produced by DJ Pierre, which was based on an instrumental he recorded under the alias "The Don" as "The Horn Song." The horn solo on the single was performed by Darrell Dixon. After its release, the label rerecorded the single with Tucker adding lyrics and vocals to the song.

This was Tucker's fourth of seven number-one singles she placed on the Billboard Dance Club Songs, reaching the top spot on September 12, 1998.

Outside the United States, the single was retitled as "Everybody Dance (The Horn Song)," with several territories adding "The Don" to the credits. In the United Kingdom, this version peaked at 28 in 1998.

== Track listing ==
CD Maxi ("Everybody Dance", US)

- Everybody Dance (Radio Edit) 3:49
- Everybody Dance (The Don's Club Mix) 12:18
- Everybody Dance (Feel Your Horn Dub) 7:08
- Everybody Dance (Club Asylum Remix) 6:51
- Everybody Dance (M.A.S. Club Vocal) 7:59
- Bonus Track
  - The Horn Song (Original Mix) 8:41

CD Maxi ("Everybody Dance (The Horn Song)", UK)

- Everybody Dance (The Horn Song) (Radio Edit) 3:48
- The Horn Song (The Don's Original Mix) 8:40
- Beautiful People (Dem 2 Remix) 6:37

CD Maxi ("Everybody Dance (The Horn Song)", Australia)

- Everybody Dance (Radio Edit) 3:49
- Everybody Dance (The Don's Club Mix) 12:18
- Everybody Dance (Feel Your Horn Dub) 7:08
- Everybody Dance (Club Asylum Remix) 6:51
- Everybody Dance (M.A.S. Club Vocal) 7:59
- The Horn Song (Original Mix) 8:41

CD Maxi ("The Horn Song", US)

- A1 The Horn Song (Original Mix) 8:00
- A2 The Horn Song (Deep Bomb Mix) 8:00
- B1 The Horn Song (Wild Pitch Instrumental) 8:00
- B2 The Horn Song (Ride My Horn Mix) 8:00
