= Most Precious Love =

Single by Blaze presents U.D.A.U.F.L. featuring Barbara Tucker

from the album Keep Hope Alive
- Released: 2005
- Recorded: 2004
- Genre: Funky house
- Length: 7:38
- Label: King Street Sounds; Defected (UK)
- Songwriter(s): Blaze
- Producer(s): Blaze

Blaze presents U.D.A.U.F.L. featuring Barbara Tucker singles chronology
"We Are One" (2003)	"Most Precious Love" (2005)	"Be Yourself (Remixes)" (2006)

"Most Precious Love" is a 2004 house song produced, written and recorded by the American duo Blaze, featuring the musical collective ensemble U.D.A.U.F.L. (the acronym for Underground Dance Artists United For Life), with vocals performed by singer Barbara Tucker. The single's history is unique in itself, having been released twice and with new mixes, as well as a 16-week climb to number one on the Billboard Dance Club Songs chart, reaching the top spot on June 4, 2005, giving Tucker her sixth chart topper. In the United Kingdom, the single charted twice, peaking at 44 in 2005, then again with a new mix by the Freemasons (sans the U.D.A.U.F.L. credits, and rebilled as "Barbara Tucker featuring Blaze"), peaking much better at number 17 in 2006. The song also peaked at number 92 on the Australian ARIA Charts.

== Track listing ==
CD Maxi (first version, US)

- Most Precious Love (DF's Future 3000 Mix) 7:14
- Most Precious Love (DF's Future 3000 Instrumental) 6:53
- Most Precious Love (Copyright Spiritual Club Mix) 10:04
- Most Precious Love (Franck Roger Remix) 7:43
- Most Precious Love (Martin Solveig Re-Edit) 8:03
- Most Precious Love (DF's Future 3000 Drums) 3:45
- Most Precious Love (Franck Roger Beats) 3:39
- Most Precious Love (DJ Tool Mix) 1:57
- Most Precious Love (Copyright Radio Edit) 3:17

CD Maxi (second version, US)

- Most Precious Love (Tiger Stripes Remix) 9:56
- Most Precious Love (Tiger Stripes Remix (Instrumental)) 9:57
- Most Precious Love (Roman S Elektrosila Vocal Remix) 11:54
- Most Precious Love (Copyright Spiritual Dub) 6:27
- Most Precious Love (Copyright Spiritual Broken Down Dub) 6:43
- Most Precious Love (Blaze Album Version) 7:38
- Most Precious Love (Blaze Extended Mix) 8:28

CD Maxi (UK)

- Most Precious Love (DF Future 3000 Mix) 7:14
- Most Precious Love (DF Future 3000 Instrumental) 6:54
- Most Precious Love (Copyright Spiritual Club Mix) 10:03
- Most Precious Love (Copyright 'So Spiritual' Dub) 6:30
- Most Precious Love (Copyright 'Broken Down' Dub) 6:45
- Most Precious Love (Franck Roger Remix) 7:43
- Most Precious Love (Martin Solveig Re-Edit) 8:03
- Most Precious Love (DF Beats) 3:44
- Most Precious Love (Franck Roger Beats) 3:39
- Most Precious Love (Acapella) 4:53
- Most Precious Love (DJ Tool Mix) 1:57
- Most Precious Love (Radio Edit) 3:16

CD Maxi ("Freemasons Remixes" UK)

- Most Precious Love (Freemasons "Proper" Club Mix) 9:05
- Most Precious Love (Freemasons Dub Mix) 7:19
- Most Precious Love (Sergio Flores Scientific Soul Afro Vox Mix) 7:39
- Most Precious Love (Ian Carey Club Mix) 6:09
- Most Precious Love (Chocolate Puma Remix) 9:05
