= Mike Perras =

- Born: June 19, 1963 (age 61); Montreal, Quebec, Canada
- Genres: House, deep house
- Occupation(s): Disc jockey, Record producer, Audio engineer, Musician
- Years active: 1983 – Present
- Labels: Mikrobe recordings
- Website: http://www.mikeperrasmusic.com/

Mike Perras (born June 19, 1963) is a Canadian DJ from Montreal, Quebec. He produced the 1991 singles "Beginning of Life" and "Keep Moving" on Bassic Records.

== Biography ==
Mike Perras is considered to be one of the leading pioneers of House Music in Montreal.

Perras is the co-founder of Mikrobe Recordings, as well as Bouche à Bouche. He is the owner of djmr.com which transfer any digital tracks on a unique 12" vinyl format. He was the owner of Club PEOPL formerly called U-N in Montreal from 2010 to 2014. He created, designed and built the entire club, along with its unique sound system.

It all started when Mike spent much of his free time during his high school & college years, as a deejay on campus radio. His professional career started in 1983 at the "Futuriste" Club in Montreal. Over the period spanning 1984 to 1991, Mike landed several residencies for many night clubs in the greater Montreal region, such as The Octagone, Superpub, Braque, and Esprit, to name a few.

On becoming a member of Montreal's "S.U.R.E" record pool in 1983 Mike met Robby Demlakian, founder of Bassic Records and rapidly became the soundman for this label, using his own studio for most of their productions. In the early 1990s Mike and Robby made some remixes for Unidisc, the most popular being D-Train's "You’re The One For Me" on the mighty Prelude imprint.

In 1987, Mike Perras was a member of one of the first House Music bands originating from Montreal: "Made 2 Funk" giving live performances featuring singer Rodney Felix. Later, Rodney was featured on Mike's first production "You Can’t Ride The Rhythm" released on Bassic in 1989. Subsequently, several projects were created in his studio by the likes of Robert Ouimet, Gino Crescenza, Phil Dimarco and many others.

The year 1991 proved to be a turning point in Perras' career, when his tracks "Beginning of Life" and "Keep Movin", both released on Bassic, were licensed over the ensuing years by top recording labels such as Azuli, BBE, International Deejay Gigolo, ITH Records/Defected, Logic, Outland and Global Underground.

Mike is deeply appreciative to those deejays who have continued to support and promote his music throughout the years: Nick Warren (UK), DJ Hell (Germany), DJ Deep (France), DJ Jeno (USA), Fish Go Deep (Ireland), Levon Vincent (US), Paul Mac (UK) and Laurent Garnier (France).
