= That Look =

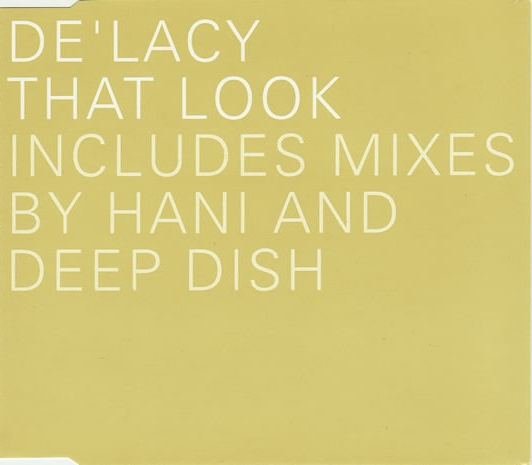
- 1996 UK and Australian variant

Single by De'Lacy
- B-side: "Remix"
- Released: 1996
- Genre: House
- Length: 4:07 (Hani's Radio Edit); 4:06 (Deep Dish Radio Edit); 15:19 (Deep Dish Vocal Parts 1&2); 9:14 (Deep Dish On The Fly Dub Mix)
- Label: Easy Street Records (US); deConstruction/BMG; MCA Records
- Songwriters: Kevin Hedge; Josh Milan
- Producer: Blaze

De'Lacy singles chronology
"Hideaway" (1995)	"That Look" (1996)	"All I Need is Love" (1997)

Music video
- "That Look" on YouTube

"That Look" is a song by American house-music group De'Lacy featuring vocals by lead vocalist Rainie Lassiter, and was released in 1996. Kevin Hedge and Josh Milan wrote the lyrics, which was published by Warner Chappell Music Ltd., and Blaze helmed the production. It was a sizeable hit in clubs in both the UK and US, and charted at number 19 on the UK Singles Chart, but fared better on the UK Dance Chart, reaching number two. In Italy, the single was a top-30 hit, while on the Eurochart Hot 100, it peaked at number 41 in September 1996. In the US, it peaked at number 27 on the Billboard Hot Dance Club Songs chart.

== Critical reception ==
Larry Flick from Billboard magazine wrote, "The wait for a follow-up to De'Lacy's soon-to-be-classic 'Hideaway' is finally over. 'That Look' begins to circulate on white labels sporting wonderfully hypnotic house beats by Hani—who is mere seconds away from permanently busting out of the underground and giving dance music's top guns a run for the cash. He provides a dreamy contrast to the track's vigorously soulful lead vocals, while never sacrificing the song's infectious chorus. On the way are remixes by the Deep Dish posse. Another clique rarely hitting a false note, Deep Dish will likely round out what is sure to be an explosive single."

Pan-European magazine Music & Media described it as "another easily accessible house number with catchy vocals. [...] Nearly guaranteed to make another big impression on radio and sales charts across Europe." Andy Beevers from Music Week's RM Dance Update gave the song a score of four out of five. He remarked that Hani's Club Look mix "builds gradually with choice vocal loops before the arrival of the full song, which is as catchy as 'Hideaway' and once again, manages to pack real power without resorting to the usual cliches and diva-style histrionics. The beats gallop along very nicely with waves of throbbing and juddery synths plus plenty of breakdowns that display the real class of the vocal."

== Track listing ==
- CD single
1. "That Look" (Deep Dish Radio Edit) – 3:37
2. "That Look" (Hani's Club Look) – 11:52
3. "That Look" (Deep Dish Remix Part 1&2) – 15:16
- CD maxi
1. "That Look" (Hani's Radio Edit) – 4:07
2. "That Look" (Deep Dish Radio Edit) – 4:06
3. "That Look" (Hani's Club Look) – 11:47
4. "That Look" (Deep Dish Remix Part 1&2) – 15:15

== Charts ==
Chart (1996)	Peak position
Europe (Eurochart Hot 100)	41
Israel (Israeli Singles Chart)	15
Italy (Musica e dischi)	23
Scotland (OCC)	20
UK Singles (OCC)	19
UK Dance (OCC)	2
UK Airplay (Music Week)	34
UK Club Chart (Music Week)	8
UK Cool Cuts (Music Week)	1
US Hot Dance Club Play (Billboard)	27
