= De'Lacy =

American house-music group

- Genre: House
- Labels: Easy Street Records deConstruction/BMG Records
- Past members: De'Lacy Davis; Gary Griffin; Glen Branch; Rainie Lassiter

De'Lacy was an American 1990s house-music group that was most famous for its single "Hideaway."

== Overview ==
Initially, the group consisted of Dr. De'Lacy Davis—percussionist and ex-Police Officer in New Jersey, Gary Griffin—bassist and keyboard player, Glenn Branch—drummer and backing vocalist, and Rainie Lassiter—lead vocalist (her daughter, A-La Renee Davis, is also an actress and singer).

The band split in the late 1990s, which left Davis, Branch, and Lassiter on vocals. In 2008, De'Lacy connected with the Italian London-based songwriter and record producer Marco Gee. They joined forces to produce "Bodyswerve," with production assistance from the New Jersey–based producer Walter Brooks.

The group continues to record with music producers in the UK and US.

== Discography ==
=== Singles ===
Year	Title	US Hot Dance Music/Club Play Singles	UK Singles Chart	Label
1994	"Hideaway"	#38	#9	Slip 'n' Slide (UK); Easy Street Records (US)
1996	"That Look"	#27	#19	Slip 'n' Slide (UK); Easy Street Records (US)
1997	"All I Need is Love"	–	–	Easy Street Records
1998	"More"	–	–	Easy Street Records
1998	"Hideaway 1998" (remix)	–	#21	deConstruction/BMG (Europe); Easy Street Records (US)
2000	"No More Lies"	–	–	Easy Street Records
2001	"Love Me"	–	–	Easy Street Records
