= Dave Rajput =

American radio personality and producer

Dave Rajput also known as Dr. Mix, is a disc jockey (DJ), music programmer, and master of ceremonies (MC). In 1985 he co-founded with Andrew Starr, Hot Mix Productions in Phoenix, Arizona. Hot Mix Productions operated the syndicated "Hot Mix Radio Network" which played on up to 175 radio stations around the world.

== Early career ==
Rajput grew up on the north side of Chicago, Illinois, and began working as a disc jockey (DJ) while in high school. In 1980, Dave Rajput moved to Phoenix, Arizona, and worked in nightclubs as a DJ.

He made a transition from playing disco music to a new style called Chicago house. Rob Wegner, a DJ in Arizona, was quoted as saying that Rajput was influential in bringing Chicago house to Arizona in the 1980s. In 1983 he won first-place trophy in the "Phoenix Arizona Battle Of The DJ's", which was held at Gatsby's Nightclub.

== Hot Mix Productions ==
In March 1985 Rajput was hired by KOPA radio station to air the Chicago house music format a Saturday night program titled "Saturday Night Hot Mix". Due to the shows success, the 3 hour program was extended to 7 hours. By May 1985, Hot Mix Productions was formed and the "Hot Mix" program aired on KOPA until January 1986. Although the station closed due to poor ratings, the only positive ratings KOPA received were due to their "Hot Mix" Saturday night program, which had doubled the radio station's overall ratings.

The show was produced and recorded by Dave Rajput and Art Morales, KOPA music director. While Rajput worked nights as a club DJ to produce and mix the weekly radio show, he also attended Mesa Community College where he took Radio & Television classes. While there, he became friends with Andrew Starr, who ran Windy City DJs that provided music and entertainment for College and High School events. Needing recording equipment to produce the show in a new venue, Rajput partnered at the end of January 1986 with Andrew Starr who had the needed equipment, record albums and assistance in producing Rajput's radio show. In exchange for use of the equipment, Rajput mentioned Andrew Starr and Windy City DJs on each "Hot Mix" show.

In July 1986, "Hot Mix" received a permanent spot on KZZP on Fridays and used the recording studios at KZZP to mix and record their show.

In September 1986, WBJW became the first station to sign up for their programming outside of Arizona and Hot Mix became a syndicated radio program. By the end of 1986, Hot Mix had five stations in syndication. In 1989, Hot Mix was nominated for its first Billboard Magazine Radio syndication award in the category “Radio Syndication - Top 40/Crossover”; Other nominees were Shadoe Stevens, Rick Dees, and the winner, Casey Kasem.

As of January 1, 1990, ABC Radio Networks contracted with Hot Mix Productions to market, distribute, and sell Hot Mix in the United States. The first mix was called “Mix of the Decade 1989-90” and was distributed on vinyl disc to all radio stations signed up to play the program. By 1989 there were 35 stations in the U.S. In July 1990, ABC began producing programs on cd which made Hot Mix the first and only show of its kind worldwide to distributed weekly on Compact Disc. In 1991, Hot Mix was being syndicated by ABC Radio Network and was being heard on over 175 stations weekly worldwide. That year it was also nominated and lost a second Billboard Radio Award in the Syndicated show Top 40/Crossover music category.

== Other music industry projects ==
Beginning in March 1988 Rajput began working with retail stores, teaching them how to program their in-store and entertainment formats. He designed a foundation and implemented training whereas all employees understand how to present music to their customers.

After 500 continuous weeks (10 years) producing the Hot Mix show, Rajput was burned out and sold his 50% ownership to his partner Andrew Starr, and went back to Chicago temporarily to invest in a business called Dine Healthy Chicago.

Since 1997, Rajput has been working as a DJ in the Scottsdale area under his production company, Hot Mix Productions. Under labels such as Powerhouse Records, Dave Rajput remixed and produced remixes during 1998-1999 that were distributed by Powerhouse Records or Promo Only.

From 1999 to 2001, he was an investor and entertainment director for the new dance club, Radius, that had been added to an existing club, Axis. In 2002 he became Entertainment Director for Barcelona Restaurant in Scottsdale where he designed and implemented an emerging music video format displayed on 15 plasma screens. He implemented new marketing programs (e.g., V.I.P. Program, Customer Appreciation Campaign, print and advertising campaign) and scheduled and formatted the live music program with the house band, Zowie Bowie. These activities resulted in Barcelona transitioning from a restaurant to nightclub and being voted Scottsdale's Best Nightclub in July 2007 by Scottsdale Magazine readers.

In September, 2001 he began to include combinations of services, such as event direction, MC, and DJ services.
