= Jamie Mulholland =

American businessman (born 1969)

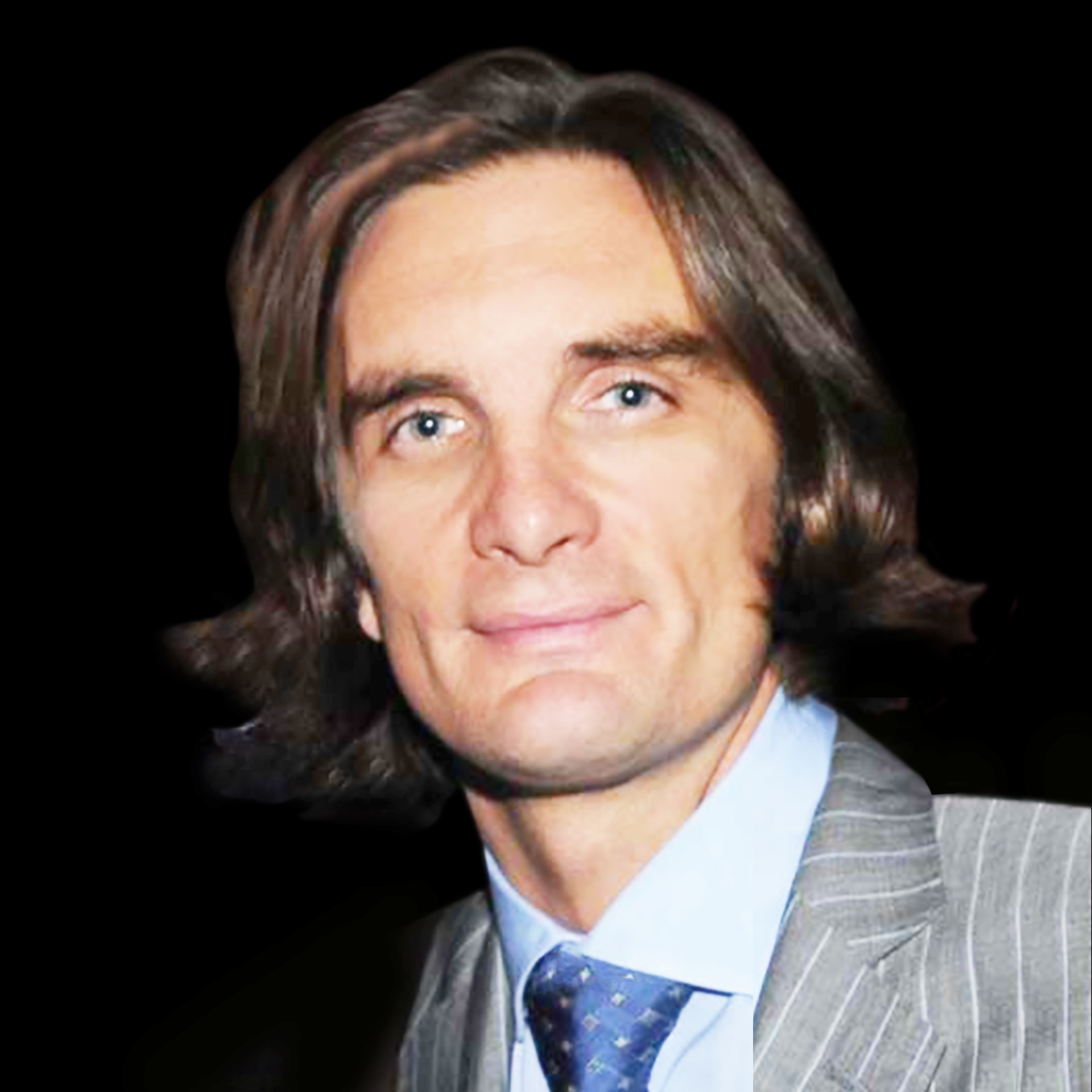
- Occupations: Hotelier; Hospitality Developer
- Known for: Ketchy Shuby; Ketchy Beach; The Surf Lodge; Cain at The Cove; Cain; Goldbar
- Spouse: Joanne Mulholland
- Children: Ocean Mulholland
- Parents: Gordon Mulholland; Diane Wilson
- Family: Matthew Mulholland; Sean Mulholland
- Website: mulhollandleisure.com

Jamie Mulholland (born 31 May 1969) is the founder of Mulholland Leisure, a hospitality development company. Entertainment venues which he has created include Cain, the pioneering Manhattan nightclub that defined early 2000s nightlife, Cain at the Cove Atlantis in the Bahamas, GoldBar lounge in downtown New York City and The Surf Lodge in Montauk, New York. His latest concepts include Ketchy Shuby in SoHo and Ketchy Beach in Southampton.

== Early life ==
Mulholland was born in South Africa, to parents Diane Wilson and Gordon Mulholland, a South African soap opera star. In 1994, Mulholland moved from the Caribbean island of Sint Maarten to New York where he began waiting tables at a local restaurant, later leaving to start a catering company. When his childhood friend Brandon Kerzner came to Manhattan, Kerzner offered Mulholland a position as bartender at Lotus, a club in the meatpacking district. Mulholland's skills at the club earned him the attention of management at PM Lounge, who hired him to manage the bar and their VIP list. From his experience, Mulholland gathered personnel and financial backing to open up his first club.

== Career ==
In 2004, Mulholland, with partner Jayma Cardoso, set up a night club called Cain in a taxi garage on Manhattan's west side, specializing in "bottle service". The venue received positive media coverage, so Mulholland arranged Cain pop-up locations in Park City, Utah for the Sundance Film Festival, Miami Beach for the MTV Video Music Awards, and the Hamptons.

In 2007, Mulholland opened both the GoldBar in NYC’s Nolita and Cain at The Cove Atlantis on Paradise Island in The Bahamas at the Atlantis Resort.

In 2008, Mulholland, opened The Surf Lodge, a 32-room hotel, night club and restaurant in Montauk, on the eastern end of Long Island.

Muholland Leisure has developed hospitality concepts including Ketchy Shuby and Ketchy Beach. Ketchy Shuby is a SoHo restaurant and lounge with dining and cocktail service. Ketchy Beach is a Southampton restaurant concept focused on coastal cuisine, wellness, sustainability, and DJ-led entertainment.
