= Star Tattooed =

Star Tattooed is an indie vocal house music project by Bulgarian award winning songwriter and producer Miro Gechev and Dary Oreshkova featured on many compilation CDs released in Europe, Russia, and Israel, including the likes of David Guetta, Bob Sinclar, Fedde Le Grand, Pakito and Benny Benassi. The project started in the summer of 2005 for a pilot project for Miro's label and recording studio 2AM. The pilot, a song called "Make Me High" featuring vocals of Ava, became licensed by Airplay Records/Universal Music - France, reaching number 30 of the official single sales charts of France. It remained in the French Top 100 Single Sales for 11 weeks. "Make Me High" was also awarded the viewers choice for 'best hit' on the 9th annual music awards of Bulgarian music TV channel MMTV. The song entered in the annual Top 100 of Evropa Plus radio (Russia). The videoclip of "Make Me High" is directed by Valeri Milev. Single remixed by Enzo Mori & Stephan Clark.

In 2008, another track by Star Tattooed was released through Airplay Records/Universal Music - France, called "What A Music!", which reached the top 10 for vinyl sales chart on French DJBuzz.com. The videoclip of "What A Music!" is directed by Lachezar Avramov. Single was being remixed by Enzo Mori & Stephan Clark (2007), Fred De F (2008)

In September 2008, Star Tattooed premiered "Wanna See U", featuring Bulgarian Music Idol finalist Plamen, during the 10th annual music awards of MMTV, a Bulgarian music channel. In January 2009, "Wanna See U" was released digitally while another track was premiered, "Baby (What About)" featuring Alexandra Raeva, a popular Bulgarian public figure and owner of a commercial clothing brand named Aggata. Shortly after, "Baby (What About)" had received great feedback - #1 on the Bulgarian National Radio chart, #1 on Pro Fm Sofia. Both tracks will be released by Airplay Records and distributed by Universal Music Division ULM.

== Discography ==
=== Singles ===
- 2006 "Make Me High" featuring Ava
- 2008 "What A Music!" featuring Daniela
- 2008 "Wanna See U (Sorry)" featuring Plamen
- 2009 "Baby (What About)" featuring Alexandra Raeva
