= Grandmaster Flowers =

American rapper and DJ

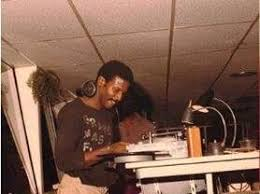
- Grandmaster Flowers performing

Background information
- Born: Jonathon Cameron Flowers; February 13, 1954
- Origin: Brooklyn, New York, United States
- Died: June 26, 1992 (age 38)
- Genres: Disco, hip hop, breaks, funk
- Occupation: DJ
- Years active: 1968–1992

Grandmaster Flowers (born Jonathon Cameron Flowers) was an American DJ from Brooklyn, New York. One of the earliest DJs to mix records together in sequence, Flowers was one of the earliest pioneers of disco.

== Biography ==
Flowers was involved in the hip hop and funk scene and had a "formative influence" on hip hop DJs such as Grandmaster Flash and Afrika Bambaataa in the mid-1970s. Although respected by those he influenced, Flowers himself never attained the heights of his successors.

As he found his career fading due in part to competition from the younger up-and-coming DJs at the end of the 1970s, Flowers struggled with a drug dependency.

== Death ==
Flowers died in 1992.
