= King Without a Crown (ABC song) =

Single by ABC

from the album Alphabet City
- B-side: "The Look of Love" (Live), "Poison Arrow" (Live)
- Released: November 1987
- Recorded: 1987
- Genre: Sophisti-pop; blue-eyed soul
- Length: 4:41
- Label: Neutron; Mercury; Vertigo; Phonogram
- Songwriters: Martin Fry; Mark White
- Producers: Martin Fry; Mark White

ABC singles chronology
"The Night You Murdered Love" (1987)	"King Without a Crown" (1987)	"One Better World" (1989)

Music video
- "King Without a Crown" on YouTube

"King Without a Crown" is a song by the English band ABC, released as the third and final single from their fourth studio album, Alphabet City (1987). It peaked at No. 44 on the UK singles chart.

== Critical reception ==
Upon its release as a single, Robin Smith of Record Mirror described "King Without a Crown" as another "goodie from the ABC chocolate box for those more tender moments" and also noted the "luscious production".

== Track listing ==
- UK CD single
1. "King Without a Crown" – 4:40
2. "The Look of Love" (Live in Boston) – 6:02
3. "Poison Arrow" (Live in Boston) – 4:37
4. "King Without a Crown" (Monarchy Mix, Abridged Version) – 4:12

== Charts ==
=== Weekly charts ===
Chart (1988)	Peak position
Belgian Singles Chart	16
Dutch Singles Chart	25
Italy Airplay (Music & Media)	1
UK Singles Chart	44
US Billboard Dance/Club Play Songs Chart	17
