= LPZ (music) =

Paraguayan dance trio

LPZ is a Paraguayan Dance trio formed in 2008. Band members are Cosmo Lopez, P. Lopez & Octavio.

== History ==
Having previously released music as Lopez for their more beatsy/hip-hop material, LPZ is the new outlet for their House and Techno productions.

Their original music and remixes have been released on labels such as Get Physical, Kitsuné, Tru Thoughts, Body Work, Brownswood, Ninja Tune and Loungin'.

In 2014 the group toured through Europe. In 2015 they started their own label called LPZ Records with releases from the trio as LPZ as well as individual artists from the group plus other artists such as Alex AQ and Robert_o.
