= One Better World =

Single by ABC

from the album Up
- Released: 15 May 1989
- Recorded: 1988
- Genre: House; garage house
- Length: 5:45
- Label: PolyGram; Phonogram; Neutron; Mercury
- Songwriters: Martin Fry; Mark White
- Producers: Martin Fry; Mark White

ABC singles chronology
| "King Without a Crown" (1988) | "One Better World" (1989) | "The Real Thing" (1989) |

Music video
- "One Better World" on YouTube

"One Better World" is a song by the English band ABC, released as the first single from their fifth studio album, Up (1989).

The song, sung with accompanying children's chorus, concerned love, peace and tolerance ("one better world"), and peaked at No. 32 on the UK Singles Chart, becoming their final top 40 hit.

== Track listing ==
- UK 7" Single
1. "One Better World" – 3:43
2. "One Better World" (Percapella Mix) – 3:59
- UK 12" Single

Side one

1. "One Better World" (Club Mix) – 5:55

Side two

1. "One Better World" (Garage Mix) – 6:02
2. "One Better World" (Percapella Mix) – 3:56

== Chart performance ==
| Chart (1989) | Peak position |
|---|---|
| Germany (GfK) | 51 |
| UK Singles Chart | 32 |
