= Jayma Cardoso =

Brazilian businesswoman

- Born: Curitiba, Brazil
- Education: Fordham University
- Occupation: Businesswoman

Jayma Cardoso is a Brazilian-born businesswoman in New York City. Working with various partners she has created high-profile nightlife establishments in New York, including CAIN, GoldBar, Lavo, and the Surf Lodge.

== Early life ==
Cardoso was born and raised in Curitiba, Brazil, and she and her mother relocated to Newark shortly after her father died when she was 17 years old. At age 19, she moved to Manhattan and enrolled at Fordham University.

To afford her college tuition, Cardoso worked as a hostess in a restaurant in SoHo, eventually becoming a cocktail waitress at Lotus, a nightclub in the meatpacking district. There, she met Jamie Mulholland, a bartender from South Africa, and they agreed to work together to start their own venture.

== Career ==
Cardoso and Mulholland secured financial investments through their connections in the nightlife circuit, and they opened CAIN, a safari-themed club in Chelsea.

CAIN was a success, and a few years later this was followed by GoldBar, a high-end gilded bar in NoLIta. Cardoso is also a partner in Lavo New York, an Italian restaurant and nightclub on the Upper East Side.

With two partners, Cardoso renovated a Montauk motel and opened the Surf Lodge in 2008. As the venue's attendance grew, it began disrupting the nearby residential community, racking up more than 900 zoning and other violations, and was nearly forced to close. In a move orchestrated by Cardoso, the Lodge was sold to a company run by tech investor Michael Walrath, just before it reopened for the 2012 summer season, while Cardoso remains a partner. She has plans to open more pop-up locations in New York and California.

Cardoso also opened a pop-up location in Park City, Utah, for the 2014 Sundance Film Festival, called the Snow Lodge. In 2015, Cardoso opened a pop-up location in Sydney, Australia for the 2016 new year.
