= Beautiful People (Barbara Tucker song) =

Single by Barbara Tucker
- Released: March 2, 1994
- Recorded: 1993
- Genre: House; garage
- Length: 4:06
- Label: Strictly Rhythm Records (US); Positiva Records (UK); Quality Records (Canada); EMI Records (Australia); ZYX Records (Germany)
- Songwriters: Barbara Tucker; India; Lem Springsteen; Louie Vega
- Producers: Gladys "Ski" Pizarro; Kenny "Dope" Gonzalez & "Little" Louie Vega

Barbara Tucker singles chronology
"Beautiful People" (1994)	"I Get Lifted" (1994)

Music video
- "Beautiful People" on YouTube

"Beautiful People" is a song recorded by American singer-songwriter Barbara Tucker, who co-wrote it with India, Lem Springsteen and "Little" Louie Vega, who along with partner Kenny "Dope" Gonzalez, co-produced the track. It was released on March 2, 1994, as her first single by Strictly Rhythm Records, and was also Tucker's first of seven number-one singles on the US Billboard Hot Dance Club Play chart, reaching the top spot on April 16, 1994. On the UK Singles Chart, it peaked at number 23, while it topped both the Music Week Dance Singles chart and the UK Club Chart.

Mixmag featured "Beautiful People" in their list of "The 30 Best Vocal House Anthems Ever" in 2018, and Pitchfork featured it in their list of "The 30 Best House Tracks of the '90s" in 2022.

== Background and release ==
Barbara Tucker grew up in Brooklyn, New York and started singing through her entertainer father, Jayotis Washington of the Persuasions. She also choreographed and danced for various dance artists, such as C&C Music Factory, Soul System and Deee-Lite. In 1992, at The Underground Network, Tucker was introduced to American DJ and record producer "Little" Louie Vega. They started working together, and he told her that he had a song for her, written by his wife India and Lem Springsteen. Tucker wrote some lyrics to it and Vega created a dub for the track, using the 'deep inside' chorus and looping it. "Beautiful People" was released on 2 March 1994 by Strictly Rhythm Records.

Tucker told in an 2024-interview about the song, "We can sing about 'Beautiful People', and we can say that, you know what your mom said it's going to be like but, how do you become a beautiful people? Where do you find the beauty? Deep inside, deep deep down inside. All we need is love. So it starts with love within. And when I ad lib, I'm just like, who is it? Where is it? Red people, black people, white people, gay people. Deep inside, all we need is love." After it debuted on the UK Singles Chart at number 23 on 27 February 1994, Tucker performed the song on Top of the Pops with her dancers wearing masks.

== Critical reception ==
Larry Flick from Billboard magazine felt the song had Tucker "flexing her gospel-honed voice to maximum effect. Factor in crafty production by "Little" Louie Vega that carefully balanced assertive beats with a wicked hook, and you had an unstoppable star vehicle." He also named it an "instantly memorable house anthem". British electronic dance and clubbing magazine Mixmag praised it as "a wonderfully crafted track. The fleet-fingered organ line and snares that hit like hand claps give it a rapturous gospel feel, packing the production full of soul. And Barabara Tucker takes this feeling to another level with her peerless vocal turn. She's one of the most deified voices in house music and 'Beautiful People' is a shining example as to why."

Maria Jimenez from Music & Media described it as "seriously smooth" and "a delicious garagey house number with a massaging bass, smooth rhythm and on target vocals." Andy Beevers from Music Week gave it a top score of five out of five and named it a "superb New York garage track". He noted that it's "currently one of the biggest club tunes around" and stated that the singer "really does justice to the excellent uplifting lyrics." James Hamilton from the Record Mirror Dance Update described it as a "superb breezily attractive gospel-ish romper" in his weekly dance column.

== Impact and legacy ==
British clubbing magazine Mixmag ranked "Beautiful People" as one of "The 30 Best Vocal House Anthems Ever" in 2018.

In 2022, Pitchfork featured it in their list of "The 30 Best House Tracks of the '90s", writing that "Tucker's sassy, yearning delivery rides a wave of jazzy chord changes, exquisite high notes, and back-to-church organs. She's got one of the most recognizable voices in house music: Its soulful tones, immaculate control, and a hint of unspecified naughtiness are enough to draw the most introverted wallflower onto the floor."

== Track listing ==
- CD maxi (US)
1. "Beautiful People" (Radio Edit) – 4:06
2. "Beautiful People" (Underground Network Mix) – 9:08
3. "Beautiful People" (Beautiful Reprise) – 5:41
4. "Beautiful People" (CJ's Club Mix) – 7:38
5. "Beautiful People" (CJ's Dub) – 8:08
6. "Beautiful People" (Original Club Mix) – 9:28
7. "Beautiful People" (CJ's Instrumental) – 8:08
8. "Beautiful People" (Mood II Swing Dub) – 5:26

== Charts ==
=== Weekly charts ===
Chart (1994)	Peak position
Canada Dance/Urban (RPM)	5
Europe (Eurochart Hot 100)	60
Europe (European Dance Radio)	10
Scotland (OCC)	80
UK Singles (Official Charts)	23
UK Dance (Music Week)	1
UK Club Chart (Music Week)	1
US Dance Club Songs (Billboard)	1
US Dance Singles Sales (Billboard)	20

=== Year-end charts ===
Chart (1994)	Position
UK Club Chart (Music Week)	10
