= Barbara Tucker =

American singer-songwriter

- Born: Barbara Tucker; March 19, 1967 (age 59)
- Origin: Brooklyn, New York, U.S.
- Genres: House, soul
- Years active: 1985–present
- Labels: Defected Records; Positiva/EMI; Strictly Rhythm

Barbara Tucker (born March 19, 1967), is an American house and soul singer, songwriter and choreographer born in Brooklyn, New York. Tucker had six No. 1 hits on the U.S. Hot Dance Club Songs chart in the 1990s and into the 2000s, and several hits in the UK.

== Biography ==
Raised in Brooklyn, New York, Tucker started singing through her entertainer father, Jayotis Washington of the group the Persuasions. As an actress, Tucker has performed in off-Broadway plays and received the T.O.R. award through the American Theater. She has choreographed and danced for artists such as C&C Music Factory, Soul System, Jay Williams, and Deee-Lite. She also choreographed the first Club Music Award show and is choreographer for the Underground Network dancers. She has been managed by celebrity and sports manager Glenn Toby.

Tucker has recorded with and sang background vocals for Deee-Lite and George Clinton. She has collaborated with David Guetta and Blaze. She was signed to the production team Masters At Work (Little Louie Vega and Kenny "Dope" Gonzalez), who produced "Deep Inside", "Beautiful People", "I Get Lifted", "Stay Together" and "Stop Playing With My Mind".

Tucker is the only recording artist to have had a yearly residency at Europe's clubbing mecca, Ibiza. In December 2016, Billboard magazine ranked her as the 63rd most successful dance artist of all-time.

== Discography ==
- 1994: "Beautiful People" - No. 1 US Hot Dance Club Songs; No. 20 US Hot Dance Music Maxi; No. 23 UK
- 1994: "I Get Lifted" - No. 1 US Hot Dance Club Songs; No. 33 UK
- 1995: "Stay Together" - No. 1 US Hot Dance Club Songs; No. 9 US Hot Dance Singles Sales; No. 46 UK
- 1996: "Keep on Lovin'You"
- 1996: "Hot Shot"
- 1997: "Bring You Love"
- 1998: "Everybody Dance (The Horn Song)" - No. 1 US Hot Dance Club Songs; No. 37 US Hot Dance Singles Sales; No. 28 UK
- 2000: "Stop Playing With My Mind" (Barbara Tucker featuring Darryl D'Bonneau) - No. 1 US Hot Dance Club Songs; No. 25 US Hot Dance Singles Sales; No. 17 UK
- 2001: "Love's On Time"
- 2003: "Let Me Be"
- 2005: "You Want Me Back"
- 2005: "Most Precious Love" (Blaze presents Uda featuring Barbara Tucker) - No. 44 UK
- 2006: "Most Precious Love" (Blaze featuring Barbara Tucker) (Freemasons Remix) - No. 17 UK
- 2007: "Love Vibrations" - No. 1 Hot Dance Club Songs
- 2008: "One" with (Peter Luts)
- 2009: "Care Free"
- 2009: "Feelin' like a Superstar"
- 2013: "I Wanna Dance with Somebody" (with The Cube Guys)
- 2015: "Live Your Life" (DJ Federico Scavo)
- 2015: "Boogie" (Ben Liebrand)
- 2017: "Think (About It)" – No. 1 Hot Dance Club Songs

== See also ==
- List of number-one dance hits (United States)
- List of artists who reached number one on the US Dance chart
