= Sabrynaah Pope =

American singer (1959 - 2005)

Sabrynaah Pope (October 6, 1959 - September 24, 2005) was a female house-music vocalist from Brooklyn, New York. She was well known for her work with house acts 95 North, DJ Pierre, and as part of U.D.A.U.F.L., which scored a number-one track on the Billboard Hot Dance Music/Club Play chart with "Most Precious Love" in 2005. She also contributed her vocals to "Keep Hope Alive," which was featured on the group's 2004 album of the same name. Pope died soon after at her New York home.
