= Stephanie Cooke =

American journalist

Stephanie S. Cooke is a journalist and author of In Mortal Hands: A Cautionary History of the Nuclear Age.

In 2007 she founded the weekly roundup on nuclear power for Energy Intelligence. She later became a proponent of wind and solar as effective alternatives to nuclear power.

She contributes to the Uranium Intelligence Weekly and the Bulletin of Atomic Scientists.
