= Intuition (Linx album) =

Studio album by Linx
- Released: 13 March 1981
- Studio: Good Earth Studios, London; Marquee Studios, London
- Genre: Britfunk; funk; pop; dance; soul; jazz-funk
- Length: 44:13
- Label: Chrysalis
- Producer: David Grant; Peter Martin; Bob Carter

Linx chronology
Intuition (1981)	Go Ahead (1981)

Singles from Intuition
- 1. "You're Lying" Released: September 1980; 2. "Intuition" Released: February 1981; 3. "Throw Away the Key" Released: June 1981

Intuition is the debut album by Britfunk band Linx, released in March 1981 on Chrysalis Records. Produced by David Grant, Peter Martin and Bob Carter of the group, the record followed the popular success of their UK Top 20 debut hit single "You're Lying", which features on the album, and incorporates styles beyond funk music, such as rock, jazz and soul. Linx preferred to think of their style as simply pop music.

The album's appearance in 1981 saw Linx ride the popularity of Britfunk in the United Kingdom, where they were among the scene's most successful acts alongside Level 42 and Freeez. It reached number eight on the UK Albums Chart and number 175 on the US Billboard Top LPs & Tape chart. The title track "Intuition" was a Top 10 hit in Britain, while "Throw Away the Key" made the Top 30. The album received positive reviews from music critics, who hailed its inventive sound and lyricism. In 2007, The Guardian included the album in their list of "1000 Albums to Hear Before You Die".

== Background and recording ==
Linx were formed in London by vocalist David Grant and bassist Peter "Sketch" Martin, who had met while working in a hi-fi shop. The duo both had industry experience, as the former briefly worked for Island Records' press office, while the latter worked for the Performing Rights Society. Linx's first demo contained songs Grant had written, and was recorded with a guitarist, but was rejected by GTO Records. The group expanded into a four-piece and hired the manager of heavy metal band Samson, who in late 1979 encouraged them to reflect the R&B boom in their music. Although a studio-only band at this point, Linx played a live showcase for record company scouts, none of whom felt the group had any hit single material.

By spring 1980, the group – who had returned to a duo of Grant and Martin – added guitarist Canute Edwards, keyboardist Bob Carter and drummer Andy Duncan. The new line-up recorded Grant's song "You're Lying". As their debut single, it was released as a private pressing of 1,000 copies and sold exclusively through City Sounds, a specialist funk shop in London. It became popular at discos, where it was played by Greg Edwards, and in turn was picked upon by Chrysalis Records, who had not seen the group's earlier live showcase, and who had no prior experience with releasing black music. Martin later reflected that the disco scene was what enabled their success: "Being able to go and hand out free records and thank people for coming along helped us build up a following. After all, it's very effective visually when you're in a packed club and in front of the stage is nothing but bodies jumping up to get the records that're being handed out."

Chrysalis subsequently released "You're Lying" commercially and it became a hit, reaching number 15 on the UK Singles Chart in October 1980, and the group became recognised as players in London's nascent Britfunk movement, alongside Light of the World. When the song made the Hot Soul Singles chart in the United States, Linx became the first Britfunk band to make an impression in the US. The group recorded Intuition at Good Earth Studios and Marquee Studios, and it was mixed at the latter. Grant, Martin and Carter produced the album, and the release bears production credit for the Solid Foundation, a production recording company set up by Grant and Martin. Numerous guest musicians contributed to the album, including multiple appearances from saxophonist Chris Hunter, who contributed solos on three songs, and trombonist Spike Edney, who appears on two songs; a saxophone also appears on "Count on Me" courtesy of Andy Hamilton.

== Composition ==
Intuition is a Britfunk album, but moves beyond simply funk and incorporates elements of pop, disco, jazz, rock and calypso, and emphasises a spontaneous feel. Writer David Hepworth emphasised Linx's intention to make pop music, saying it was primarily a pop record instead of "funk or disco or black music or any of those other marketing handles," while journalist Mary Harron refers to the record as a sharp and "intelligent" jazz-funk album that exemplifies how British examples of the genre were becoming "livelier" than American jazz-funk. Robert Palmer of The New York Times writes that several songs on the album owe more to Linx's influence of American funk bands like the Commodores and Kool and the Gang, whereas others feature a distinctive British flavour. He commented that the album, alongside Dennis Bovell's contemporary Brain Damage and the music of the Specials, were helping black British music develop a strong character of its own, commenting: "It is British inner-city music, and surely it is no accident that it has erupted along with the country's inner-city rioting. All pop music can be seen as a process of self-definition, but in the case of Britain's new black pop, this process seems particularly self-conscious." Some songs feature socio-political themes.

The title track is a funk song with lyrics reminiscent of Grange Hill, while "Throw Away the Key" emphasises minor chords. "You're Lying", which re-appears on the album, features a Trinidadian-style carnival rhythm with steel drums. "I Won't Forget" is a detour into reggae pop; Palmer described it as "a black answer to the white group that pioneered the style, the Police." "Don't Get In My Way" has been described as "clear, hostile statement" against modern society, and was described by Palmer as among the most distinctive songs, "pointedly political in its lyrics and pointedly British in its accent." The handclaps and backing vocals on "Rise and Shine" are credited to The Intercacaphonous Corridor Choir. The choir were asked to chant, reflecting the popularity of chanting at Britfunk nightclubs and shows. Grant recalled: "We even felt the chant, in the name of authenticity, got a group of clubbers to come into the studio and chant."

== Release ==
The album's appearance in 1981 was during a year where Britfunk became popular in Britain, with fellow acts like Level 42 and Freeez also achieving notice, and joining Linx and others like Central Line and the RAH Band in helping turn the sound into a movement, following the slightly earlier work of Hi-Tension and Light of the World. Writer Bob Stanley wrote that, due to Linx and other Britfunk acts, "Black British faces became Top of the Pops regulars in 1981." While mindful of their place in the rise of British funk music, Linx described their sound as "pop music", with Martin pointing out: "It can come from any particular base. It just happens that we started off from a funk base." Hepworth elaborated: "The pair see the competition as coming from the direction of The Police and Adam and the Ants rather than The Gap Band. Linx have no desire to end up amongst the faceless outfits clogging up the disco charts." The sleeve of Intuition, which Hepworth compared to Chic, only depicts Grant and Martin, which Linx believed were their most distinctive-looking members.

Released on 13 March 1981 by Chrysalis, Intuition spent ten weeks on the UK Albums Chart, peaking at number eight. Promoted by a music video featuring Bertice Reading, the title track, "Intuition", reached number seven on the UK Singles Chart in April and spent thirteen weeks on the chart, whilst "Throw Away the Key" spent nine weeks beginning in June, peaking at number 21. The success of the title track was aided by a technician's strike on Top of the Pops that resulted in only repeat performances and music videos being aired on the show for a period. The video to the song was played when the song was outside the Top 40 and helped it reach the top ten. In the United States, Intuition reached number 175 on the Billboard Top LPs & Tape chart, and number 39 on the Top R&B Albums chart. The single "Tonight We Can Shine" reached number 45 on the US R&B Chart in May 1981. Linx's live performances of the era featured twin drummers, harking back to the Glitter Band and Adam and the Ants. In 2011, Cherry Red Records subsidiary Big Break Records re-released Intuition as a CD in a Super Jewel Box with six bonus tracks, including numerous twelve-inch remixes.

== Critical reception ==
Professional ratings
Review scores
Source	Rating
AllMusic	4.5/5 stars
Christgau's Record Guide	A
Record Mirror	4/5 stars
Smash Hits	8/10
The Village Voice	A−
The Virgin Encyclopedia of Eighties Music	3/5 stars

In a contemporary review for Smash Hits, David Hepworth wrote that Linx had created a "proper album" instead of a record of "just three singles plus filler". He praised the subtle, distinctive hooks, strong tunes and weaving of disparate genres into an "enchanting, seamless whole," and though finding the "stilted ballads" to interrupt the album's dancing sound, he said the "summery" record nevertheless places Linx "at the forefront of homegrown dance music. The first three songs alone justify the claims made for them." In his "Consumer's Guide" for The Village Voice, Robert Christgau wrote that although the album's funk was "so light", Linx were "sly devils" that "make clear that they've thought more about love than Pablo Cruise", further praiseing side one's use of steel drums and the "doorslam drums" of "Throw Away the Key" and "slick antiliberal militance" of "Don't Get in My Way" on side two. He later ranked it number 42 in his list of the year's best albums, curated for the annual Pazz & Jop poll.

Sunie Fletcher of Record Mirror, who expressed prior unfamiliarity with Britfunk, praised Linx's tight sound and performance and Grant's "remarkable voice", describing the album as "sophisticated but never slick; danceable but never dumb". Mary Harron of The Guardian described Linx as "genuine innovators" and wrote that Intuition is "sharp, intelligent and surprising," with lyrics that are "quite different from the rosy clichés of most jazz-funk: 'Don't Get In My Way' is a clear, hostile statement against a society that won't move unless you kick it." A reviewer for Musician, Player and Listener described Linx as the "new face of Black British funk" and called Intuition a "steamy gumbo of snappy songhooks, rhythms that shake you by the scruff of the neck, and socio-political passion that has a lot more to do with the punk protest of the Clash than it does the cosmological parables of Earth, Wind and Fire." In his year-end column on Britfunk, Brian Aitken of the Aberdeen Evening Express called Intuition a "brilliant debut." NME ranked it at number 36 in their year-end best albums list.

In 2007, The Guardian included Intuition in their list of "1000 Albums to Hear Before You Die", calling it "an overlooked example of intelligent club-pop, eight years ahead of Soul II Soul." In 2017, the website of UK Black History Month included the album in a list of 30 important albums by black British artists, curated to mark three decades of African History Month; contributor Kwaku made note of the album's "clever, pop-friendly Brit-funk gems like the classic 'You're Lying'." Nigel Williamson of The Observer included the album becoming a success in his list of significant events in the history of British black music. A reviewer for the New Statesman reflected that both Intuition and follow-up album Go Ahead were "super albums" of "songs to go out and about to. Grant and Martin make the music, put on the show, that best understands the flash and strut of the modern disco." The album is listed in the 1993 book The Blackwell Guide to Soul Recordings.

== Track listing ==
All songs written by David Grant and Peter "Sketch" Martin, except where noted.

=== Side one ===
1. "Wonder What You're Doing Now" – 5:27
2. "I Won't Forget" (Grant, Martin, Canute Edwards) – 4:17
3. "Intuition" – 4:01
4. "There's Love" – 3:55
5. "Rise and Shine" – 3:44

=== Side two ===
1. "Throw Away the Key" – 5:13
2. "Together We Can Shine" – 3:59
3. "Count on Me" – 3:35
4. "You're Lying" (Grant, Martin, Burt Salvary) – 4:45
5. "Don't Get in My Way" – 5:17

== Personnel ==
Adapted from the liner notes of Intuition

Linx

- David Grant – vocals, writing, production
- Canute Edwards – guitar
- Peter "Sketch" Martin – bass
- Bob Carter – keyboards, production
- Andy Duncan – drums

Additional

- Peter Martin – production
- Peter Wagg – art direction
- Chris Porter – engineer (Good Earth Studios), handclaps and backing vocals (tracks 6 and 9)
- Tim Painter – engineer (Marquee Studios)
- Mikkie Harvey – handclaps (track 1)
- Simon Hanhart – handclaps (tracks 1 and 6), backing vocals (track 6), tape operator, engineer
- Maurie Michael – backing vocals (track 2)
- Chris Hunter – saxophone solo (tracks 3, 8 and 10)
- The Intercacaphonous Corridor Choir – handclasp and backing vocals (track 5)
- Andy Hamilton – saxophone (track 8)
- Spike Edney – trombone (tracks 8 and 10)
- Rays – lacquer cut
- Brian Cooke – photography (insert)
- Gered Mankowitz – photography (sleeve)
- Andy Lovell – tape operator, engineer
- Gordon Fordyce – tape operator, engineer
- Keith Bourdice – tape operator, engineer
- Mark Wade – tape operator, engineer

== Chart positions ==
Chart (1981)	Peak position
UK Albums Chart	8
US Billboard Top LPs & Tape	175
US Top R&B Albums	39
