= Hi-Tension (album) =

Studio album by Hi-Tension
- Released: 20 October 1978
- Studio: Island, London
- Genre: Britfunk; funk; soul; R&B; disco; jazz-funk
- Length: 42:37
- Label: Island
- Producer: Alex Sadkin; Kofi Ayivor; Chris Blackwell

Singles from Sound-on-Sound
- 1. "Hi-Tension" Released: March 1978; 2. "British Hustle" Released: August 1978; 3. "Autumn Love" Released: November 1978

Hi-Tension is the sole album by Britfunk band Hi-Tension, released in 1978 by Island Records. Following the domestic success of the band's hit single "Hi-Tension", considered the first Britfunk song, the band recorded the album with producers Alex Sadkin and Kofi Ayivor at Island Studios, London. Disagreements arose between producer Sadkin, who proposed a commercial direction, and band leader David Joseph who wanted the album to retain the band's strong vibrant live sound. Hi-Tension reached number 54 on the UK Albums Chart, while "British Hustle" provided the band with their sole Top 10 hit. Despite its muted reception, and the group subsequently disbanding, Hi-Tension has since been regarded as a key and influential album in Britfunk and British R&B.

== Background ==
Hi-Tension formed in Willesden Green, North West London in 1976, evolving out of the earlier group Hott Wax, who were active in the early 1970s. The group was fronted by David Joseph, their lead vocalist, lead songwriter and keyboardist, but the line-up was completed by nine other members, including two drummers and two saxophonists. They began as a live band, playing gigs only in their weekends as they had day jobs in the week, and only performing in venues with their desired atmosphere, avoiding pubs, venues with small stages and places unwelcoming of the band's funk sound.

On 24 February 1978, the group appeared on the BBC Two programme Blackcurrant, a live showcase of black music, during which they played their eponymous song "Hi-Tension", which was written when the band were performing a jam session and found themselves "short of a number," so improvised a new song. After a tape of Hi-Tension was given to Chris Blackwell of Island Records, he signed them to the label and released the song in March as a limited edition single. All 5,000 copies sold out quickly, so in April they released an edited version of the song for mainstream sales. It entered the UK Singles Chart in May 1978, peaking at number 13, and the group performed it on Top of the Pops. According to writer Paul Lester, "to see Hi-Tension, all scratchy guitars and indelicate brass, exorbitant afros and jittery motion, perform it on Top of the Pops is to witness underground late-70s black London in full effect."

With their eponymous song, Hi-Tension are said to have inaugurated Britfunk, establishing the genre's influence of American bands like Mass Production, Brass Construction and Crown Heights Affair via the danceable uptempo style, "with the groove being the main hook, as the 'songs' were often more chants than verse/bridge/chorus affairs," according to DJ Joey Negro. Hi-Tension found themselves at the vanguard of the Britfunk scene in its early years, with fellow groups like Light of the World. In an interview with the Daily Mirror in June 1978, Joseph announced that the group would "shortly" record their new album and tour in July, while commenting on audiences assuming the band were American due to their style being "very much like that of Earth Wind and Fire."

== Recording and composition ==
"We may have our records played in the discos but we're not a disco band. Disco sounds too commercial, there's nothing else there. We're a funk band like a new wave band, playing aggressive, getting everything out."

— David Joseph

Hi-Tension was recorded at Island Studios, London, and was produced between Kofi Ayivor and Alex Sadkin, aside from the re-appearing "Hi-Tension", which had been produced by Ayivor with Chris Blackwell. Sadkin, who had worked with T-Connection and Third World, was recommended by Blackwell after Hi-Tension found that Ayivor was not providing them with enough direction and discipline. While conceding that Sadkin was a somewhat reasonable producer, Joseph found his work rate to be "too slow" and "too relaxed," noting how he would spend two to three days working on drums alone, "and out of that he didn't bring out the kind of sound I felt we needed." The pair's approaches conflicted, as Sadkin favoured a commercial sound whereas Joseph wanted the music to sound "hard and powerful," and led to them falling out. Joseph said of Sadkin's approach: "All the energy part of the music was mixed low."

According to writer Daryl Easlea, Hi-Tension exemplifies the vibrancy of Britfunk, exploring American-style soul music with a uniquely jagged approach. The group sing with British accents throughout, marking another departure from American funk. While Hi-Tension have been called disco, Joseph felt that Hi-Tension were not a disco group but a funk band that played powerfully like a new wave band. The album version of "Hi-Tension" is noted for its "uniquely British take on American funk" by Lester, citing its raw, propulsive and "darkly dub-spacious" sound and "the proto-'drop'" in which the group chant "bless the funk" during a pause three minutes into the song." "Searchin'" emphasises groove, while the fast "British Hustle" features handclaps reminiscent of Evelyn King. While predominately comprising uptempo funk songs, the album also features slow jams in the sunny "You're My Girl" and "Autumn Love", a dreamy, relaxed song influenced by War.

== Release and reception ==
In August 1978, "British Hustle" was released as a single and became the band's only UK Top 10 hit, where it reached number 8. The track was popularised by British DJs like Greg Edwards and Robbie Vincent, and according to Easlea, "[t]he single had a freshness, edginess and pizzazz that simply wasn’t coming out of the US disco phenomenon at that point." Black Echoes reported in September that the album would be named Bless the Funk and released on 20 October. To promote the upcoming record, Hi-Tension began a 40-date tour in autumn 1978, but the album was not yet completed, "so it was almost a waste of time" according to Joseph. The band also found their equipment kept getting damaged, commenting: "It's like the better you become, and the more things you get, the worse it becomes." In early 1979, the band fired their management team – who operated internally at Island – due to the problems surrounding the album's production, and signed to a new company who gave them what they saw as "the right balance of guidance and independence.

The eventually released album, named Hi-Tension, entered the UK Albums Chart in January 1979, peaking at number 54 and spending four weeks in total, but was unsuccessful in the United States, while in Britain, the single "Autumn Love" – released November 1978 – was overlooked by DJs in favour of its more typical "rhythm-rattling" B-side "Unspoken", and did not chart. In the music press, Hi-Tension suffered credibility issues for being young and British funk band. In their review, Black Music & Jazz Review panned the album, saying that despite "the sterling efforts" of producers Ayivor and Sadkin, Hi-Tension proved "that you cannot turn a pig's ear into a silk purse." Beat Instrumental nonetheless commented that the band "certainly feature in the slim first division of their type of music." The group followed the album with the single "Funktified," which Blackwell allowed Joseph to produce alone, but the musician felt he "rather spoilt" the job due to the stressful working conditions, with "too many people around me, telling me what to do and saying they want it ready by tomorrow." He began to feel uncomfortable with Island Records, telling an interviewer in 1979: "When I talk to Island, I speak my mind. I don't think the directors and so on are wrong in all their decisions, but I don't think they still really groove to us." The group disbanded later in the year.

In a retrospective review, Alex Henderson of AllMusic named Hi-Tension an "Album Pick", commenting that while the album "isn't a masterpiece", its uptempo funk songs "are generally catchy and enjoyable" and highlighting the album's importance, saying "if you're discussing British R&B of the 1970s, it's an album that has to be mentioned." An "Expanded Edition" of Hi-Tension was re-released by Cherry Red Records in 2012. Reviewing the reissue, Daryl Easlea of BBC Music described the "exciting" album as "British funk at its best from the era of punk and disco" and felt that it "remains a vibrant capture of a simpler time." He commented on the band's enduring influence on subsequent Britfunk, saying: "Light of the World, Linx, Central Line and Freeez all owed them a debt, and this, their only album, is a testament to their prowess." In 2017, the website of UK Black History Month included the album in a list of 30 important albums by black British artists, curated to mark three decades of African History Month. The title track features in The Guardian's list of the top 10 Britfunk songs, crediting it as the "Year Zero explosion" that later inspired Funkapolitan, Stimulin and hits like ABC's "Tears Are Not Enough", Spandau Ballet's "Chant No. 1 (I Don't Need This Pressure On)" and Haircut 100's "Favourite Shirts."

== Track listing ==
=== Side one ===
1. "You're My Girl" (Jeffrey Guishard) – 4:20
2. "Searchin'" (Guishard) – 4:15
3. "Autumn Love" (Hi-Tension) – 4:57
4. "Power and Lightning" (David Joseph) – 4:18
5. "Unspoken" (Joseph) – 3:45

=== Side two ===
6. "British Hustle" (Joseph, Guillard, Kenneth Joseph, Paul Philipps, Leroy Phillips) – 6:35
7. "If It Moves You" (Paul McLean) – 5:17
8. "Hi-Tension" (Hi-Tension) – 5:10
9. "Peace on Earth" (David Joseph, Kenneth Joseph) – 3:55

=== 2012 bonus tracks ===
10. "British Hustle" (7" version)
11. "Hi-Tension" (7" version)
12. "Girl I Betcha"

== Personnel ==
Adapted from the liner notes of Hi-Tension

Hi-Tension

- Ray Alan Eko – alto saxophone (tracks 3, 7, 9), tenor saxophone (tracks 3, 7, 9)
- David Joseph – lead vocals, horn arrangements, electric piano, Clavinet, string synthesizer, Minimoog, Yamaha organ
- Leroy Williams – congas, bongos, percussion
- David Reid – drums
- Paapa Mensah – drums
- Kenneth Joseph – electric bass, backing vocals
- Paul McLean – lead guitar, guitar synthesizer, backing vocals
- Paul Phillips – rhythm guitar, backing vocals
- Bob Sydor – tenor saxophone (tracks 1, 2, 4, 5)
- Jeffrey Guishard – robotoms, timbales, percussion, lead vocals
- Guy Barker – trumpet (tracks 1, 2, 3, 5)
- Patrick McLean – alto saxophone, tenor saxophone
- Bill Lyall – string arrangements (tracks 1, 3)
- Peter Thoms – trombone (tracks 1, 2, 3, 5)

Technical

- Chris Blackwell – executive producer, production (track 8)
- Godwin Logie – engineer
- Alex Sadkin – engineer (all tracks except track 8)
- John Dent – mastering
- Alex Sadkin – production (all tracks except track 8)
- Kofi Ayivor – production
