= List of funk musicians =

This is a list of notable funk music bands and artists. This includes artists who have either been very important to the funk genre or have had a considerable amount of exposure (such as in the case of one who has been on a major label). Bands are listed by the first letter in their name (not including the words "a", "an", or "the"), and individuals are listed by last name.

== A ==
- African Music Machine
- Los Amigos Invisibles
- Steve Arrington
- Atlantic Starr
- Average White Band

== B ==
- B. T. Express
- Mike Banks
- Bar-Kays
- Big Pig
- Black Heat
- Eddie Bo
- Bootsy's Rubber Band
- Brainstorm
- The Brand New Heavies
- Brass Construction
- Michael Brecker
- Brick
- The Brothers Johnson
- James Brown
- The Budos Band

== C ==
- Cameo
- Jimmy Castor
- Central Line
- A Certain Ratio
- Chakk
- Chapter 8
- Charles Wright & the Watts 103rd Street Rhythm Band
- Chic
- Chicks Incorporated
- Chocolate Milk
- George Clinton
- Bootsy Collins
- Catfish Collins
- Lyn Collins
- Commodores
- Con Funk Shun
- Nikka Costa
- Don Covay
- Crown Heights Affair

== D ==
- DAG
- Betty Davis
- Miles Davis
- Dayton
- Dazz Band
- Deckchairs Overboard
- Manu Dibango
- Dr. John
- George Duke
- Candy Dulfer
- Dumpstaphunk
- Dyke and the Blazers
- Dynasty

== E ==
- Earth, Wind & Fire
- ESG

== F ==
- The Fabulous Counts
- Fashion
- Fat Larry's Band
- Fatback Band
- Faze-O
- Amp Fiddler
- Lee Fields
- Fishbone
- Flyte Tyme
- Freeez
- Fun Lovin' Criminals
- Funkadelic

== G ==
- Galactic
- The Gap Band
- Marvin Gaye
- Gonzalez
- Graham Central Station
- Larry Graham
- The Grease Band
- The Greyboy Allstars

== H ==
- Herbie Hancock
- Isaac Hayes
- Leon Haywood
- The Headhunters
- Heatwave
- Jimi Hendrix
- Here Come the Mummies
- The Highlighters
- Hi-Tension
- Hot Chocolate

== I ==
- Ian Dury and the Blockheads
- Imagination
- The Isley Brothers

== J ==
- The J.B.'s
- Rick James
- Jamiroquai
- Sharon Jones & the Dap-Kings
- Don Julian

== K ==
- Karma
- Kay Gees
- KC and the Sunshine Band
- Eddie Kendricks
- Chaka Khan
- Kleeer
- Klymaxx
- Kool & the Gang
- Fela Kuti

== L ==
- L.T.D.
- Lakeside
- Bill Laswell
- Light of the World
- Paula Lima
- Linx
- Carrie Lucas

== M ==
- Machine
- Manchild
- Mandrill
- Manzel
- Teena Marie
- Material
- Maximum Joy
- Curtis Mayfield
- Maze
- The Meters
- Mezzoforte
- Miami Sound Machine
- Mickey & the Soul Generation
- Midnight Star
- Mingo Fishtrap
- Walter "Junie" Morrison
- Mtume

== N ==
- Meshell Ndegeocello
- N.E.R.D
- Art Neville
- The Nite-Liters

== O ==
- Ohio Players
- Olympic Runners
- Orgone
- Osaka Monaurail
- Osiris (Washington, D.C. band)
- Ozomatli

== P ==
- Maceo Parker
- Parliament
- Parliament-Funkadelic
- Teddy Pendergrass
- People's Choice
- Pieces of a Dream
- Prince

== R ==
- Jesse Rae
- Nelson Rangell
- Ready for the World
- Republic of Loose
- The Rimshots
- Rip Rig + Panic
- Ripple
- Nile Rodgers
- Rufus

== S ==
- Shakatak
- Shalamar
- Garry Shider
- Shotgun
- Side Effect
- Dawn Silva
- Skull Snaps
- Skyy
- Slave
- Sly and the Family Stone
- Soulive
- Sound Experience
- South Shore Commission
- Sam Sparro
- Spearhead
- Stargard
- Sly Stone
- Geo C and Tha Storm
- Sun
- Switch
- Swoop

== T ==
- T-Connection
- T. S. Monk
- A Taste of Honey
- Richard Tee
- The Temptations
- Joe Tex
- The Time
- Tower of Power
- Roger Troutman
- TV on the Radio

== V ==
- Vulfpeck

== W ==
- War
- Johnny "Guitar" Watson
- Fred Wesley
- The Whispers
- The Whitefield Brothers
- Marva Whitney
- Stevie Wonder
- Phil Woods
- Bernie Worrell

== Z ==
- Zapp

== See also ==
- List of funk rock and funk metal bands
