= Soulboy =

Music youth subculture

Soulboys (sometimes spelled soul boys) were a working-class English youth subculture of the late 1970s and early 1980s, and fans of American soul and funk music. The subculture emerged in North West England as northern soul event attendees began to take more interest in the modern funk and jazz funk sounds of artists such as Lonnie Liston Smith and Roy Ayers, instead of the obscure 1960s soul records that characterized the northern soul scene.

There was simultaneous development of the subculture at nightclubs in South East England, such as The Goldmine in Canvey Island and The Royalty in Southgate. DJs involved with the soulboy scene included Chris Hill, Robbie Vincent, Froggy, Greg Edwards, Pete Tong, George Power and Chris Bangs. Caister Soul Weekenders became one of the main features of the scene, and still exist today. The casual subculture that emerged in the 1980s was heavily influenced by the soulboys, including the sideways fringed wedge hairstyle and Lois jeans.

Although the soulboy scene was huge by the early 1980s, it was centred on American funk acts and was largely based in decentralised provincial areas in the South East; therefore, it received far less media coverage than other youth cultures of the same period, notably punk and New Romanticism. After 1983, the soulboy scene in South East England metamorphosed into the rare groove scene of the mid 1980s, which only finally died out with the UK Acid House boom of 1988.
