= Nigel Grainge =

- Born: 4 October 1946 London, England
- Died: 11 June 2017 (aged 70) Santa Monica, California, U.S.
- Genres: Brit funk, soul, British pop music
- Occupation: Music executive
- Years active: 1970-2017
- Labels: Ensign Records (founder)
- Formerly of: Sinéad O'Connor; Boomtown Rats; Eddy Grant; Light of the World; Phil Fearon & Galaxy

Nigel Grainge (4 October 1946 – 11 June 2017) was a British music executive, and the founder of Ensign Records in 1976.

== Biography ==
Born to Jeanette (née Allen) and Cecil Grainge (previously Goldstein) on 4 October 1946 to a Jewish family in North London. His younger brother is CEO of Universal Music Group, Lucian Grainge.

Growing up, Grainge was heavily influenced towards music by his father Cecil, who owned a record shop. Each weekend his father would bring him a new record to play at home. As a young boy he attended Coldfall Primary School in Muswell Hill from 1954 to 1958 and then went on to Christ's College, Finchley, North London.

He began his career in the record business as a Sales Office assistant at Phonogram UK in 1970. After promotion to become US-affiliated labels Manager, he was responsible for the marketing and chart success of many hits (some unlikely) by acts such as Faron Young, the Detroit Emeralds, The Stylistics, Chuck Berry, Rod Stewart (switching "Maggie May" from an original 'B' side), and eventually became the company's successful head of A&R from 1974 to 1976.

He directly signed Thin Lizzy, 10cc, The Steve Miller Band, and a worldwide license for the successful All Platinum label (hits by Shirley & Co, the Moments, etc.), among others, before deciding to leave and set up his own independent label, duly funded by Phonogram.

Ensign, the record label he founded in 1976 ('N' for his first name and 'signs'), had early success with The Boomtown Rats in 1977, who went on to have 13 UK Top 20 entries including two at number 1 – "Rat Trap" and "I Don't Like Mondays". Ensign also had a constant stream of UK and European hits with Flash and the Pan, Eddy Grant, Light of the World, and Phil Fearon & Galaxy. Grainge's cohort throughout the life of the label was London DJ Chris Hill.

Grainge sold the company to Chrysalis Records in 1984 and continued to run it from their own offices in Notting Hill until the mid-1990s. The roster had reached its most credible peak with Sinéad O'Connor, The Waterboys, World Party, and the Blue Aeroplanes. The Waterboys' contract with Ensign expired in 1991.

By 1990, millions of records had been sold by O'Connor, the biggest success being "Nothing Compares 2 U" which hit number one in over 30 countries.

After EMI acquired Chrysalis Records in 1991, Grainge felt stifled by the corporate changes and requested to leave the company, and the label was thus folded into its parent.

With the acquisition of the EMI group by Universal in 2012, the ownership of the Ensign catalogue of artists was transferred to Parlophone/Warner Music Group, and in 2016 Ensign and Chrysalis were acquired by Blue Raincoat Music.

Grainge relocated in 2002 to Santa Monica, California. He co-founded cultural search-engine TunesMap, launched in 2017, which is owned by G. Marq Roswell. He also worked as Special Advisor on the HBO drama series Vinyl, centered on a fictional record company in the early-1970s, with the pilot directed by Martin Scorsese.

== Personal life and death ==
Grainge died on 11 June 2017, aged 70, in Santa Monica, California of complications following surgery. He was survived by his sister (Stephanie Grainge), two brothers (Sir Lucian Grainge and Justin Grainge), daughters (Heidi and Roxie), and a grandson (Jasper).
