= Keep in Touch =

Single by Freeez
- Released: 1980
- Genre: Jazz fusion, jazz-funk, instrumental
- Length: 6:50 (12" single)
- Label: Calibre / Pink Rythm
- Songwriter(s): Freeez
- Producer(s): John Rocca

Freeez singles chronology
"Keep in Touch" (1980)	"Stay" / "Hot Footing It" (1980)

"Keep in Touch" is the debut single by British jazz-funk/dance band Freeez. Self-funded and released, the idea for the song came from lead artist John Rocca, while playing with another informal group led by Jean-Paul 'Bluey' Maunick, who was then in between UK brit funk projects Light of the World and Incognito. Derived from the group, the personnel performing on the recording were Maunick (guitar), Peter Maas (bass), Paul Morgan (drums), Jason Wright (keyboards), and Rocca (percussion).

The song was created in one night at a studio in London's West End, and the first pressing was on Rocca's own Pink Rythm Records, with deliberate artistic misspelling. The label artwork was designed by his brother Danny and the record sleeves were collaboratively spray painted by hand. It sold several thousand units under this first guise before being licensed to Pye Records soul sublabel Calibre. "Keep In Touch" reached number 49 in the UK single sales charts.

This was followed up with another 12-inch single "Stay" b/w "Hot Footing It", released only on Pink Rythm after Pye opted to not release it. John Rocca next invested in the self-funded production of "Southern Freeez", after which Freeez signed to Beggars Banquet Records, which at that time was a small, rising company.

== Track listings ==
Pink Rythm 12" release:

1. "Keep in Touch" – 6:50
2. "Keep in Touch" (edit) – 5:48

Pye/Calibre 12" release:

1. "Keep in Touch" – 6:50
2. "Keep in Touch" (re-mix) – 7:52

== Chart performance ==
"Keep in Touch" sold over 35,000 copies and entered the UK Singles Chart for 3 weeks in June 1980.

Chart (1980)	Peak
UK Singles Chart	#49

== Credits ==
- Produced by John Rocca for Pink Rythm Productions
- Arranged by Freeez
