= Chris Hill (DJ) =

British disc jockey (1945–2025)

- Born: 8 January 1945
- Died: 11 September 2025 (aged 80)
- Occupation: Disc jockey

Chris Hill (8 January 1945 – 11 September 2025) was a British disc jockey. He worked at the club Lacy Lady in Ilford, as well as at the Goldmine on Canvey Island and was the head of the Soul Mafia, a group of DJs which included Greg Edwards, DJ Froggy, Jeff Young and Robbie Vincent, in London and the South East of England into the early 1980s. He had a major input into the creation of the British Brit funk music scene of the late 1970s and early 1980s.

== Career ==
=== Early DJ experience ===
Hill's first residency was at The Cock public house in Orsett, Essex in the late 1960s where he would play jazz records. The Canvey Island Goldmine owner, Stan Barrett and manager Kenny Faulkner came to The Cock and offered Hill the residency. Hill stated: "They'd heard about me and when I started at The Goldmine on Canvey Island in November 1972, people there didn't understand a "soul" night."

In 1975–1976, he promoted his 'swing revival nights', playing the music of Count Basie, Jimmie Lunceford, Chick Webb and Benny Goodman. During this short period, which was promoted by Hill, the Goldmine had a monopoly on GI uniforms and scarlet-lipped jive-dolls whilst promoting the music of Glenn Miller and those swing revival nights. Club goers followed the brief trend of 'swing fever' for a few months until it attracted the attention of The Sun newspaper, after which the trend ended returning to soul, funk, and jazz. Attendees at the Goldmine swing nights included Sade and Siouxsie Sioux.

Having completed a second stint back on Canvey's Goldmine in the early 1980s, Hill decided to quit the club scene in 1985 and concentrate on his Ensign duties with Sinéad O'Connor whom he had recently discovered. In 1987, he was offered a weekend job in Hamburg on Radio 107 and created SoulBeat.

Hill was a key figure on the Brit funk scene of the late 1970s and early 1980s. He worked as a record company man behind many of the first Brit funk tracks that would be central to the Brit funk movement and launched many acts on the Ensign record label alongside the late Nigel Grainge who founded the label. Bands included Light of the World and Incognito. He also helped a number of tracks he championed cross over into the UK singles chart, including "Jazz Carnival" by Azymuth, Hi-Tension's "British Hustle" and Freeez's "Southern Freeez".

Alexis Petridis has described him as "perhaps the scene's biggest and most controversial name, with a divisive penchant for onstage wackiness". However Hill has also been praised by fellow DJ Gilles Peterson, who stated that he was "an amazing DJ" musically and said that he was the British equivalent of Larry Levan. His residency at the Lacy Lady saw the club hosting punk bands including the Clash, the Damned and Subway Sect alongside Hill playing krautrock and Afrobeat as well as jazz-funk and soul. Alongside his club work, Hill was a regular DJ on the soul pirate radio station Radio Invicta.

=== Chart success and British Hustle ===
In 1975, he released a "break-in" novelty record, in the style of Dickie Goodman, called "Renta Santa", which became a hit single in the UK during the Christmas season. On the record, Hill narrates using various artists' song clips to tell a Christmas story. The record peaked at No. 10 on the UK Singles Chart in December of that year. Early the following year, he released a cover version of the Coasters' hit "Yakety Yak", with the innuendo-laden "Ride On!" featured on its B-side that failed to chart. However, later on, his second Christmas record, "Bionic Santa", cut with audio segments in a similar style to "Renta Santa", was more successful, again with "Ride On!" on the flip-side. It also peaked at No. 10 on the chart in December 1976. Both tracks, which included snippets of other hits of the time, were released on the Philips label.

His final release, "Disco Santa", again in the same style, released for Christmas 1978, failed to chart. That same year, a short film was made about the British soul and funk music scene in the South called British Hustle filmed in Clouds Nightclub in Brixton and The Gold Mine club on Canvey Island. Hill appeared in the latter Gold Mine section of the film (Greg Edwards DJ'd at Clouds) singing and playing a swanee whistle over the records, whilst encouraging dancers to do congas and get on each others shoulders. A 'world's worst dancer' competition was enacted as a joke response to the elite dance circle battles, which Hill did not like to see at his gigs.

=== From 1979 ===
Until 2011, Hill ran the Lacy Lady in Ilford, London. Hill also had a major involvement in the 'Caister Soul Weekenders', a DJ event which began in 1979 and took place twice each year until 2019, initially in Caister-on-Sea but, in later years, at the Vauxhall Holiday Park in Great Yarmouth. He worked on these with his long term event collaborator and music promoter Brian Rix.

== Death ==
Hill died on 11 September 2025, at the age of 80.

== Discography ==
=== Singles ===
Year	Song	^{UK Chart}
1975	"Renta Santa"	10
1976	"Yakety Yak"	—
1976	"Bionic Santa"	10
1978	"Disco Santa"	—
"—" denotes releases that did not chart.
