= Southern Freeez =

Southern Freeez may refer to:

- Southern Freeez (album), an album by jazz-funk band Freeez
- "Southern Freeez" (song), a song by Freeez from the album
