= Bertice Reading =

American singer

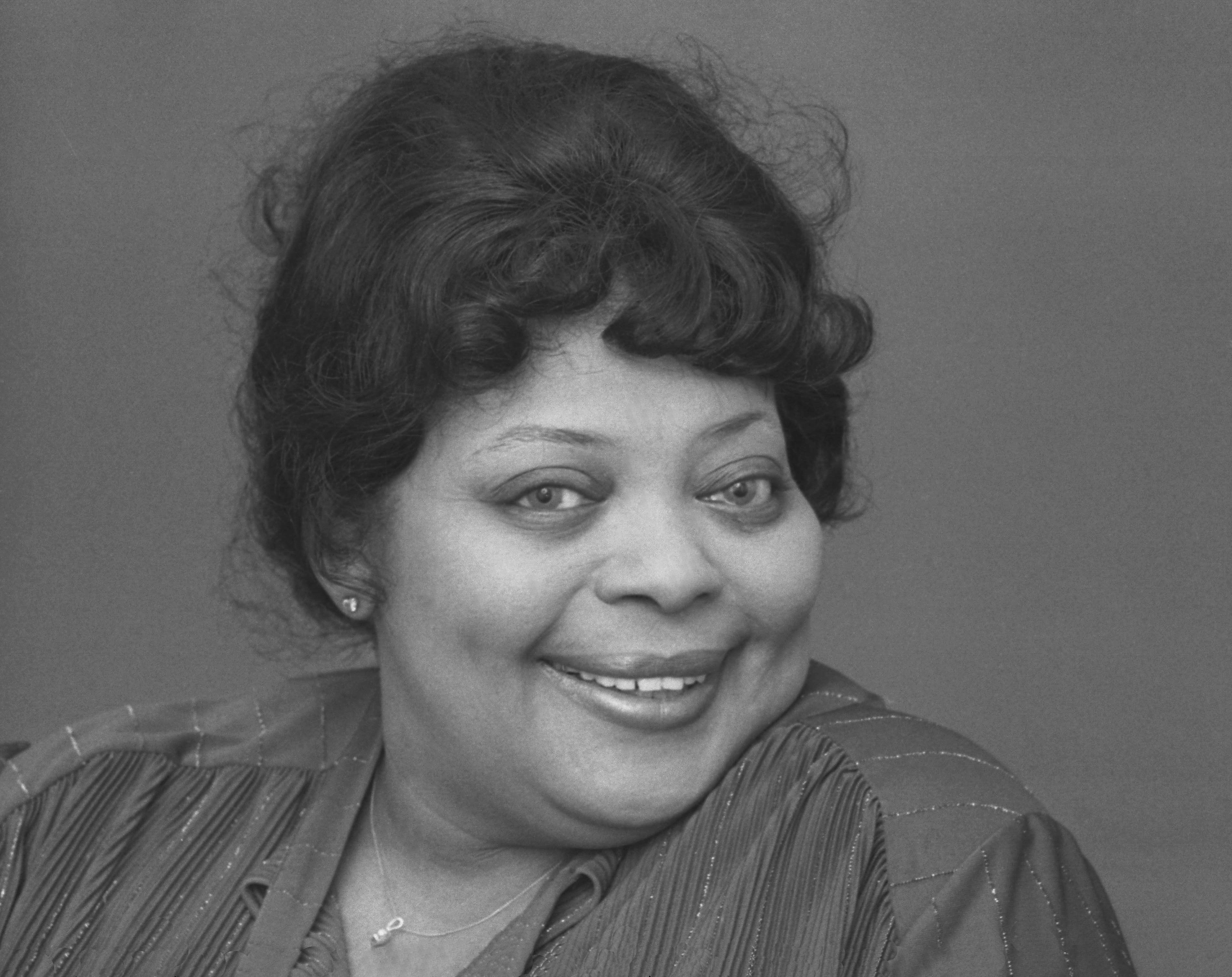
- Bertice Reading by Allan Warren

Background information
- Born: July 22, 1933; Chester, Pennsylvania, U.S.
- Died: June 8, 1991 (aged 57) London, England
- Genres: Blues, jazz, musical theatre
- Occupations: Actress, singer

Bertice Reading (July 22, 1933 – June 8, 1991) was an American-born actress, singer and revue artiste, who was based in England for most of her career.

== Life and career ==
Reading was born in Chester, Pennsylvania. Her performing career started at the age of 3, when she was talent-spotted by Bill "Bojangles" Robinson.

She appeared in the all-black revue The Jazz Train, in Paris in the spring of 1955 and at the Piccadilly Theatre in London. In this show she had success playing the great blues singer Bessie Smith. Adept at a whole range of musical styles, from gospel to blues to musical comedy, Reading also had a striking appearance.

Her straight-acting performance as a nurse in William Faulkner's play Requiem for a Nun in 1957 earned her a nomination for a Tony Award when it transferred to Broadway. She also appeared in the 1958 musical Valmouth, adapted from a Ronald Firbank novel of the same name. The next years saw Reading spending time abroad in cabaret, as well as having two marriages.

In 1979 she appeared at the Roundhouse in London in Only In America, a tribute show to the musical composers Jerry Leiber and Mike Stoller. In the 1980s she presented many one-woman shows, usually debuting at the Kings Head Theatre Club in Islington, London.

Reading appeared but did not sing in a 1981 music video by UK soul/funk band Linx for their album's title track "Intuition".

In 1982, Reading she appeared in the Sandy Wilson musical Valmouth at the Chichester Festival Theatre playing Mrs Yajñavalkya. It was in 1982 that Reading married Thomas R.V. Blake with a ceremony held in Chichester.

In the 1985 solo show Every Inch a Lady, Reading donned a pink satin tutu and danced to a version of The Sugar Plum Fairy, which had been choreographed by the dancer Wayne Sleep.

Reading appeared in the 1986 film version of Little Shop of Horrors, as the "Downtown" older woman, who sings the beginning words to the song "Skid Row (Downtown)". In the summer of 1986 she recorded a disco album with producer Ian Levine, which she appeared on TV-AM's Good Morning Britain to promote.

She also appeared in South Pacific as Bloody Mary in Bournemouth in 1987 and at the Bristol Hippodrome.

== Record Release ==
In 1958, Reading released 'Rock Baby Rock'/'It's a Boy', in the U.K., on Parlophone45-R 4462. Reading had already recorded 'Rock', in Paris, with Art Simmons, (Quartet BAM Records LD 321), in 1956. In 1958, Geoff Love And His Orchestra recorded it in Abbey Road Studio, London. The first version was the opening track on the French 10" lp ' Bertice Reading Jazz Singer ', (BAM321), in 1956.

== Death ==
Reading died at the age of 57 in London, following a stroke, although her age was initially misreported as 54.

== Sources ==
- The Daily Telegraph Third Book of Obituaries (Entertainers), edited by Hugh Massingberd, Pan Macmillan, 1998. ISBN 978-0330367752
