= Gonna Get You =

Studio album by Freeez
- Released: (United Kingdom) 1983 (Germany) 1983 (Japan) 1984
- Recorded: July to December 1982 at Unique Recording, Vanguard Studios, New York
- Genres: Freestyle, post-disco, electro, synth-pop
- Label: Beggars Banquet
- Producer: Arthur Baker

Freeez chronology
Southern Freeez (1981)	Gonna Get You (1983)	Idle Vice (1985)

Gonna Get You is the second album by the British jazz-funk/post-disco group Freeez, released in the UK in 1983 by Beggars Banquet, and in Japan in 1984 by Victor Musical Industries.

The album was produced by American electro/freestyle musician and DJ Arthur Baker, well known for his work with Afrika Bambaataa and Planet Patrol.

The album was recorded in New York between July–December 1982.

== Track listing ==
1. "We've Got the Juice" (Andy Stennett, Arthur Baker, Everton McCalla, John Rocca, Peter Maas) – 6:19
2. "Can't Keep My Love" (Andy Barrett, Andy Schwartz, Lotti Golden) – 5:05
3. "Love's Gonna Get You" (Stennett, Baker, McCalla, Rocca, Maas) - 5:58
4. "Pop Goes My Love/Scratch Goes My Dub" (Arthur Baker, Peter Maas, John Rocca, Andy Sternett) – 8:10
5. "I.O.U." (Arthur Baker, John Robie) – 8:26
6. "Freezin'" (Andy Sternett, Arthur Baker, Everton McCalla, Peter Maas, Tina B.) – 6:08
7. "Can You" (Everton McCalla) – 5:51
8. "Watch Me" (Peter Maas, John Rocca, Arthur Baker) – 5:40

== Performers ==
- Andy Stennett - synthesizer, glockenspiel, backing vocals
- Andy Wallace, Frank Heller, Fred Zarr, Jay Burnett, John Robie, Marc Berry, Mike Theodore, Peter Robbins - engineers
- Tina B - backing vocals
- John Rocca - congas, bongos, vocals, hand percussion
- Fred Zarr - piano, synthesizer
- Andy Barrett Schwartz - synthesizer
- Arthur Baker - drum machine, producer, arranger, mixer

== Charts ==
Album title	Label	Release date	Chart position
Album title	Label	Release date	UK Albums Chart
Gonna Get You	Beggars Banquet	October 1983	46
