= Pop Goes My Love/Scratch Goes My Dub =

"Pop Goes My Love"

Single by Freeez

from the album Gonna Get You
- B-side: "Scratch Goes My Dub"
- Released: October 1983
- Genre: Electro-boogie
- Length: 3:40 & 4:15 (7" version)
- Label: Virgin (Germany); Beggars Banquet (UK); Victor (Japan); Streetwise Records (U.S.)
- Songwriters: Andy Stennett, Arthur Baker, John Rocca, and Peter Maas
- Producer: Arthur Baker

Freeez singles chronology
"I.O.U." (1983)	"Pop Goes My Love" / "Scratch Goes My Dub" (1983)	"Love's Gonna Get You" (1983)

"Pop Goes My Love"/"Scratch Goes My Dub" is a song by British group Freeez, released as a single in 1983 on Beggars Banquet Records. It was produced by Arthur Baker and is from the group's second album Gonna Get You. The song reached No. 26 on the UK Singles Chart. In the United States, the single reached No. 47 on the Billboard R&B singles chart and No. 5 on the Hot Dance Club Play chart.

== Track listings ==
=== 1983 releases ===
12" vinyl

- US: Streetwise / SWRL-2215

vinyl label reads, "Recorded & Mixed at Unique Studios, N.Y."

Side one
No.	Title	Length
1.	"Pop Goes My Love"	8:03

Side two
No.	Title	Length
1.	"Scratch Goes My Dub"	9:18

Side three
No.	Title	Length
1.	"No Need For Greed"	3:24

7" vinyl

- UK, Spanish and German

Side one
No.	Title	Length
1.	"Pop Goes My Love"	3:40

Side two
No.	Title	Length
1.	"Scratch Goes My Dub"	4:15

== Charts ==
Chart	Peak position
UK Singles Chart	26
U.S. Billboard Hot Black Singles	47
U.S. Billboard Hot Dance Club Play	5

== Credits ==
- Written by Maas, Rocca, Stennett, and Baker
- Produced and mixed by Arthur Baker
  - Mixed at Unique
  - Engineers: Frank Heller, Jay Burnett
- Recorded at Unique, Vanguard; Daily Planet, New York City
