= Intuition (Linx song) =

1981 single by Linx

Single by Linx

from the album Intuition
- B-side: "Together We Can Shine"
- Released: 13 February 1981
- Genre: Jazz-funk; pop soul
- Length: 3:20
- Label: Chrysalis
- Songwriter(s): David Grant; Peter Martin
- Producer(s): Bob Carter; David Grant; Peter Martin

Linx singles chronology
"You're Lying" (1980)	"Intuition" (1981)	"Together We Can Shine" (1981)

"Intuition" is a song by Brit funk band Linx, released in February 1981 as the third single from their debut album of the same name. It became their highest charting single, peaking at number 7 on the UK Singles Chart.

== Reception ==
Reviewing the song for Record Mirror, Mark Total wrote "A classic 12" slice of sophisticated funk that I'm proud to say is totally BRITISH. It is as original as it is danceable with an acoustic guitar adding extra texture to a solid bass and drum part. David Grant doesn't attempt to Americanise his voice but just sings soulfully".

== Track listings ==
7"

1. "Intuition" – 3:20
2. "Together We Can Shine" – 3:42

12"

- "Intuition" – 4:05
- "Together We Can Shine" – 5:38

== Personnel ==
- David Grant – lead vocals
- Peter 'Sketch' Martin – bass
- Bob Carter – keyboards
- Andy Duncan – drums
- Canute Edwards – guitar
- Chis Hunter – saxophone solo

== Charts ==
Chart (1981)	Peak position
Australia (Kent Music Report)	69
Ireland (IRMA)	10
Netherlands (Single Top 100)	38
UK Singles (OCC)	7
