= Flying High (Freeez song) =

Single by Freeez

from the album "Southern Freeez"
- Released: April 1981
- Recorded: 1980, Vineyard Studios.
- Genre: Jazz-funk, Boogie
- Length: 5:30 (12" version)
- Label: Beggars Banquet (UK & Germany)
- Songwriter(s): Peter Maas
- Producer(s): John Rocca

Freeez singles chronology
"Southern Freeez" (1981)	"Flying High" (1981)	"One To One" (1982)

"Flying High" is the third single from Freeez' debut album Southern Freeez.

"Flying High" performed moderately well in the UK, peaking at #35 on the UK Singles Chart

== Track listing ==
=== UK single ===
1. "Flying High" - 05:30
2. "Flying High (remix)"

== Chart ==
=== 1981 ===
Chart	Peak position
UK Singles	#35

== Credits ==
- Bass guitar by Peter Maas
- Drums by Paul Morgan
- Electric guitar by Gordon Sullivan
- Keyboard by Andy Stennett
- Horns arrangement by Andy Stennett
- Percussion by John Rocca
- Saxophone and flute by Geoff Warren
- Trombone by David Allison
- Trumpet by Lawrie Brown
  - Produced by John Rocca
  - Engineers: Simon Sullivan, Paul Burry

== See also ==
- Freeez discography
- Freeez
