= Phil Fearon and Galaxy =

Studio album by Phil Fearon & Galaxy
- Released: August 1984
- Studios: FJR Studios, London
- Genres: Funk; post-disco
- Labels: Ensign; Island
- Producer: Phil Fearon

Phil Fearon & Galaxy chronology
Phil Fearon and Galaxy (1984)	This Kind of Love (1985)

Singles from Phil Fearon and Galaxy
- 1. "Dancing Tight" Released: April 1983; 2. "Wait Until Tonight (My Love)" Released: July 1983; 3. "Fantasy Real" Released: October 1983; 4. "What Do I Do?" Released: February 1984; 5. "Everybody's Laughing" Released: July 1984

Professional ratings
Review scores
Source	Rating
AllMusic	3.5/5 stars
Number One	3/5 stars
Record Mirror	1/5 stars

Phil Fearon and Galaxy is the debut album by Phil Fearon & Galaxy, released in 1984, by Ensign Records in the UK and Island Records in Europe and North America. The albums includes several successful singles, with "Dancing Tight", "What Do I Do?" and "Everybody's Laughing" charting in the top 10 of the UK Singles Chart. The album was also successful, peaking at number 8 on the Albums Chart.

== Reception ==
Reviewing the album for Record Mirror, Eleanor Levy gave it one out of five, writing "Without the slightest ruffling of the cerebral hemisphere, Phil Fearon's music goes in the right ear and out the left." "A couple of boppers, a couple of snifflers, all with irritating poppy drums and the requisite girly voices in the background. This is NICE music – innocuous and fluffy – couldn't hurt anybody. The problem is, it can't touch or move anybody either", concluding that it is "slick but boring".

Reviewing for Number One, Nick Adams gave the album three out five, writing "Now that Shalamar are gone, Phil plays the pop game better than any other black act. From video to chat show, Fearon has made sure his music has a name and a face. The result is the string of chart hits collected here into an amiable mixture of dance steps and smoochy ballads. It's classy, if undistinguished."

Retrospectively reviewing for AllMusic, Sharon Mawer gave the album three and a half stars out of five, writing "Five of the nine songs were released as singles with three of them going Top 10 in an era when it was the norm to release track after track to keep the album in the public eye, and although the album's chart run was short (only eight weeks) it made a suitable impression, carrying on from where Kid Creole & Coconuts and Modern Romance had left off with a series of bite sized funk-pop-dance songs, all sounding as if the band were having great fun, which they probably were." Mawer also wrote that "Fearon makes good use of his female backing vocalists Julie Gore and Dorothy Galdes who were not only given the harmony duties on most of the tracks but lead duties on most of the choruses."

== Track listing ==
All tracks are written by Phil Fearon, except where noted.

No.	Title	Writer(s)	Co-Producer(s)	Length
1.	"Everybody's Laughing"			3:42
2.	"Dancing Tight"			4:25
3.	"Fantasy Real"	Phil Fearon, Jascha Tambimuttu	Jascha Tambimuttu	4:14
4.	"Do You Want More?"	Phil Fearon, Jascha Tambimuttu	Jascha Tambimuttu	5:17
5.	"Wait Until Tonight (My Love)"			4:58
6.	"What Do I Do?" (Carnival Mix)			3:50
7.	"Head Over Heels"		Pete Wingfield	5:55
8.	"Before You Throw Love Away"			5:28
9.	"Still Thinking of You"	Phil Fearon, Jascha Tambimuttu, Steve Glen, Mike Burns	Jascha Tambimuttu	4:17
10.	"Anything You Want"			4:00

A version with a different track running order (yet same catalogue number) was also released:

No.	Title	Length
1.	"What Do I Do?" (Carnival Mix)	3:50
2.	"Anything You Want"	4:00
3.	"Before You Throw Love Away"	5:28
4.	"Wait Until Tonight (My Love)"	4:58
5.	"Head Over Heels"	5:55
6.	"Everybody's Laughing"	3:42
7.	"Fantasy Real"	4:14
8.	"Still Thinking of You"	4:17
9.	"Do You Want More?"	5:17
10.	"Dancing Tight"	4:25

== Personnel ==
Galaxy

- Phil Fearon – lead vocals, backing vocals, electric piano, Grand Piano, Synthesizers, guitar, bass guitar, percussion, Drums
- Dorothy Galdez – vocals
- Julie Gore – vocals
- Lenny Fearon – vocals, trumpet, percussion
- Claudio Galdez – saxophone, flute

Additional musicians

- John Girvan, Bias Boshell – additional keyboards
- Pandit Dinesh, Floyd Dyce – percussion
- Frederick August, Simon Wagland, Piero Gasparini, Megan Pound – strings
- Basia Hook – guest vocals on "Do You Want More?"
- Kit Campbell, Jascha Tambimuttu, Helen Irwin, Terence Morris, Garry Hughes – additional musicians and singers

Technical

- Laurie Jago – engineer, production assistant, remixing
- Phil Fearon – engineer, remixing
- Joe Arlotta – New York remix engineer
- Nick Webb – cutting engineer at Abbey Road Studios, London
- John Morales and Sergio Munzibai – remixing at Blank Tape Studios, New York
- Alan Moy – mastering
- Mike Prior – photography
- Recorded at FJR Studios, London

== Charts ==
Chart (1984)	Peak position
Dutch Albums (Album Top 100)	29
UK Albums (Official Charts)	8
