= I Want It to Be Real =

"I Want it to Be Real"

Song
- Genre: Latin freestyle, synth-pop, electro
- Label: Beggars Banquet Records

I Want it to Be Real is a 1984 dance single by John Rocca, lead vocalist and founder of the London-based dance group Freeez. It charted day number one on the dance charts.

== See also ==
- John Rocca
