= That Beats My Patience =

Single by Freeez

from the album Idle Vice
- B-side: "All the Way"
- Released: 1985
- Genre: Electronic, synth-pop
- Length: 5:50 (12" version)
- Label: Virgin (France), Beggars Banquet (UK)
- Songwriter(s): Freeez
- Producer(s): Peter Wilson

Freeez singles chronology
"Love's Gonna Get You" (1983)	"That Beats My Patience" (1985)	"Train of Thoughts" (1985)

"That Beats My Patience" is a song by British group Freeez from the 1985 album Idle Vice, released by Beggars Banquet Records.

== Track listing ==
=== UK & France single ===
A. "That Beats My Patience" - 5:50
B. "All the Way" / "Tell Me What to Do" - 11:08

== Credits ==
- Produced by Mark Berry (tracks 2, 3), Peter Wilson (track 1)
- Remixed by Peter Wilson (track 3)
