= Tony Etoria =

Welsh musician

Tony Etoria (born c.1954) is a Welsh singer, songwriter, music producer and actor of Jamaican descent, best known for his 1977 hit "I Can Prove It".

Etoria was born in Ely, Cardiff. At the age of 23, he had a top 40 UK hit with the disco song "I Can Prove It". He wrote the song himself and it was later covered by Phil Fearon. He went on to record for EMI and other labels. In 1978 he and his band appeared alongside Racing Cars and Budgie in the first Welsh Rock Festival, presented by John Peel on BBC Wales. He was a member of the 1980s bands Decoupage and Osibisa.

Etoria also opened the "Famous Studios" recording studio in Trade Street, Cardiff, where he recorded and produced some notable acts, including Screaming Lord Sutch, Yr Anhrefn, the Super Furry Animals and the Boo Radleys.

His acting career has included appearances and writing material for the theatre companies "Welsh Fargo" and "On the Edge". He also had a regular role in the Welsh-language TV soap Coleg.

== Radio ==
- Britain's Other Music Hall: the Story of the Blackface Minstrels (2009)
- The Past Master: Motown and Me (2009)
- Wales and the Congo - a Re-evaluation (2012)

== Television ==
- Coleg
