= Phil Fearon =

Jamaican–English musician and record producer

- Born: Phillip Joseph Fearon; 30 July 1956 (age 70); Colony of Jamaica
- Origin: London, England
- Genres: R&B, post-disco, funk
- Years active: 1982–present
- Labels: Ensign, Chrysalis, Production House

Phillip Joseph Fearon (born 30 July 1956) is a Jamaican–British record producer. He was the lead singer, songwriter and multi-instrumentalist for the 1980s band Galaxy.

== Career ==
Fearon was born in the Colony of Jamaica in 1956 and moved to London with his parents at the age of six in 1962. After running a reggae sound system, he joined Hott Wax (which evolved into Brit funk pioneers Hi-Tension after he left). In the late 1970s was a mainstay of hit group Kandidate which scored a number 11 chart hit in 1979 with "I Don't Wanna Lose You". He set up a studio in his north London house and initially recorded with the group Proton on Champagne Records.

Fearon first conceived Galaxy as a band of "four or five white guys" that he would manufacture and write and produce for, while he remained behind the scenes. Instead he was encouraged by a prospective record company to front the act after they were impressed by his performance on his demos.

Fearon's first recording as Galaxy (with assistance from singers Julie and Dorothy) was "Head Over Heels" on Ensign Records in 1982, which became a club hit. The first success came with the top 5 hit "Dancing Tight" in 1983 and over the next 15 months they chalked up a further four UK top 40 singles including the top 10s "What Do I Do" and "Everybody's Laughing". Their post-disco debut album, Phil Fearon and Galaxy also made the top 10 in 1984. After a quiet period, Fearon returned to the top 10 for the last time with a revival of Tony Etoria's "I Can Prove It" in 1986 (also a minor US R&B hit). Originally self-produced, the track was given additional production and mixing by hitmakers Stock Aitken Waterman at the suggestion of Fearon's record company, with the singer totally re-recording his original vocal under the direction of producer Mike Stock.

The artist's version of "Ain't Nothin' But a Houseparty" was also produced by Stock Aitken Waterman, but this time Fearon's contribution was reduced to coming in to the studio to sing on the track, which was entirely the producers' vision. "I was a bit like a passenger on that one, a willing passenger," he recalled.

'It was a little bit daunting because I wasn't sure if the sound was going to work for me."

After his diversion with SAW, Fearon continued to run a production company from his home making commercial dance records.

Similar to the RAH Band, Galaxy was not a true group of musicians but a front for an individual producing all the music in a studio environment, with two female backing singers to supplement the recording sound (Dorothy Galdes and Julie Gore). Galaxy's best known hits are "Dancing Tight", "What Do I Do?", "Everybody's Laughing" and "I Can Prove It", which were all up-beat commercial pop songs, hitting the top 10 of the UK Singles Chart. They also had a near-top 40 hit with "You Don't Need a Reason" which stalled at number 42 on the UK chart in 1985. Galaxy's records were distinctly early 1980s in style, with prominent use of synthesizers.

Galaxy's popularity waned in the late 1980s, with the trend moving towards acid house, though a later single, a cover version of the Showstoppers' "Ain't Nothin' But a Houseparty", was an early example of this genre. In 1987, Fearon founded and managed a successful record label called Production House Records.

Fearon returned to performing as a special guest at the Caister Soul Weekender in May 2010, being brought out of retirement by longtime colleagues and Caister Soul Weekender promoters Chris Hill and Brian Rix. Fearon has since continued to appear at 1980s soul nights and various festivals around the UK and abroad.

== Work with other artists ==
Galaxy backed T. C. Curtis on his 1986 dance hit "You Should Have Known Better.

== Personal life ==
Fearon is married to Dee Fearon, the lead singer of 90's dance act Baby D. Their daughter Stephanie is an actress and singer, who appeared on the CITV show My Parents Are Aliens, and was later a semi-finalist on the 2010 BBC talent search Over the Rainbow. They have four children and five grandchildren.

== Discography ==
=== Albums ===
Year	Title	Label	Peak chart positions	
Year	Title	Label	UK	NL
1984	Phil Fearon and Galaxy	Ensign	8	29
1985	This Kind of Love	Ensign	98	—
1991	The Best of Phil Fearon & Galaxy	Ensign/Chrysalis	—	—
1992	Dancing Tight – The Best of Phil Fearon & Galaxy	Ensign	—	—
1994	The Best of Phil Fearon & Galaxy	Music Club	—	—
1995	Dancing Tight – All the Hits Extended	More Music	—	—
1996	Greatest Hits	EMI Gold	—	—
2001	Phil Fearon & Galaxy – All the Hits	EMI Gold	—	—
2013	Phil Fearon & Galaxy – Ain't Nothing But a Party: The 12" Anthology	Cherry Pop	—	—
"—" denotes releases that did not chart or were not released in that territory.

=== Singles ===
Year	Single	Peak chart positions						Certifications
Year	Single	UK	BE (FLA)	IRE	NL	NZ	US R&B	Certifications
1982	"Head Over Heels" (Note: Credited as Galaxy)	77	—	—	—	—	—	
1983	"Dancing Tight" (Note: Credited as Galaxy featuring Phil Fearon)	4	—	5	19	—	—	
1983	"Wait Until Tonight (My Love)"	20	—	22	—	—	—	
1983	"Fantasy Real" (Note: Credited as Phil Fearon and Galaxy)	41	—	—	—	—	—	
1984	"What Do I Do?"	5	31	11	22	30	—	BPI: Silver
1984	"Everybody's Laughing"	10	—	16	8	—	—	
1985	"You Don't Need a Reason"	42	—	—	—	—	—	
1985	"This Kind of Love" (Note: Credited as Phil Fearon and Galaxy featuring Dee Galdes)	70	—	—	—	—	—	
1986	"I Can Prove It" (Note: Credited as Phil Fearon)	8	—	16	—	38	72	
1986	"Ain't Nothin' But a Houseparty"	60	—	—	—	—	82	
1987	"Nothing Is Too Good for You"	110	—	—	—	—	—	
"—" denotes releases that did not chart or were not released in that territory.
