= Carrie and David's Popshop =

British children's television series

- Genre: Children's Music
- Presented by: Carrie Grant and David Grant
- No. of episodes: 30

Production
- Running time: 20 minutes
- Production company: BBC Scotland

Original release
- Network: CBeebies
- Release: 18 February – 28 March 2008

Carrie and David's Popshop is a children's musical television series that aired on CBeebies, originally broadcast in 2008. It is presented by celebrity vocal coaches Carrie Grant and David Grant, with their pet dog Riff, puppeteered by Dave Chapman, and produced by BBC Scotland. Repeats originally finished on 28 October 2011, but an episode was aired to celebrate the channel's tenth birthday on 11 February 2012. Repeats returned on 7 September 2013 and repeats ended again in 2015. On 25 February 2008, it was announced that Carrie and David's Popshop would end after its first series.

== Overview ==
Carrie and David took off the show by acting out a music-related situation that usually ends in them giving the viewer (behind the camera) an object. Then a warm-up song is sung. A child or children would then come into the popshop and ask for a song for a certain purpose (e.g. to skip going to bed or to get their dad to dance) then Carrie and David would have an idea (We're getting the feeling!) and sing a song asking what genre of music they want their song to be sung in. The customer would then leave awaiting their pod (see below). Unlike most current CBeebies programmes, Carrie & David wear the same clothes in every episode.

Carrie and David's dog Riff would then 'prepare the zone' and sing a song about setting the equipment up. Carrie and David would expand their idea, come up with lyrics and decide what instruments to use, during which the object that the viewer was given earlier usually comes into use. Carrie and David then perform the song they have come up with and Riff records it on a pod. Riff hands the pod to the viewer who gives the pod to the original customer. When they open the pod stars come out and the video of their song comes out. They dance and sing along. The actors were used to play other parts in other episodes (e.g., siblings or other relatives.) This is why so few actors were used in the production of Series 1 and 2. Most of the actors were Scottish and sourced from auditions nationwide.

The show was produced by Nigel P Harris for BBC Scotland. The musical director is Andrew McCrorie-Shand who did the music for earlier programmes like Tots TV, and Teletubbies, and Rosie and Jim.

== Ratings ==
Episode no.	Airdate	Total viewers
1	18 February 2008	441,000
2	19 February 2008	425,000
3	20 February 2008	330,000
4	21 February 2008	568,000
5	22 February 2008	410,000
6	25 February 2008	468,000
7	26 February 2008	342,000
8	27 February 2008	398,000
9	28 February 2008	440,000
10	29 February 2008	364,000
11	3 March 2008	345,000
12	4 March 2008	342,000
13	5 March 2008	459,000
14	6 March 2008	203,000
15	7 March 2008	315,000
16	10 March 2008	494,000
17	11 March 2008	523,000
18	12 March 2008	415,000
19	13 March 2008	479,000
20	14 March 2008	337,000
21	17 March 2008	390,000
22	18 March 2008	402,000
23	19 March 2008	425,000
24	20 March 2008	447,000
25	21 March 2008	316,000
26	24 March 2008	414,000
27	25 March 2008	426,000
28	26 March 2008	381,000
29	27 March 2008	375,000
30	28 March 2008	426,000

== Episodes ==
No. in series	Title	Directed by	Written by	Original release date
1	"I Love to Sing"	Michael Towner	Davey Moore	18 February 2008
2	"I'm a Winner"	Unknown	Unknown	19 February 2008
3	"The World Gets Bigger"	Michael Towner	Rick Vanes	20 February 2008
4	"How Am I Gonna Wake You Up?"	Michael Towner	Johnny Meres	21 February 2008
5	"I Don't Wanna Go to Bed"	Unknown	Unknown	22 February 2008
6	"Side to Side"	Unknown	Unknown	25 February 2008
7	"Rain"	Michael Towner	Neil Richards	26 February 2008
8	"Kite"	Michael Towner	Neil Richards	27 February 2008
9	"The Dream Team"	Unknown	Unknown	28 February 2008
10	"Tick Tock"	Unknown	Unknown	29 February 2008
11	"Are Stars Magic"	Helen Scott	Keith Brumpton	3 March 2008
12	"I've Lost My Smile"	Unknown	Unknown	4 March 2008
13	"On Safari"	Unknown	Unknown	5 March 2008
14	"No One's You"	Unknown	Unknown	6 March 2008
15	"Scary Music"	Unknown	Unknown	7 March 2008
16	"No Longer Grumpy"	Unknown	Unknown	10 March 2008
17	"I Like Being Me"	Michael Towner	Davey Moore	11 March 2008
18	"Yum Yum Yum"	Unknown	Unknown	12 March 2008
19	"Until the End of Time"	Unknown	Unknown	13 March 2008
20	"Fly Away"	Unknown	Unknown	14 March 2008
21	"I Want a New Story"	Unknown	Unknown	17 March 2008
22	"Sorry"	Helen Scott	Peter Hynes	18 March 2008
23	"New Home for Me"	Helen Scott	Peter Hynes	19 March 2008
24	"Check Me"	Unknown	Unknown	20 March 2008
25	"I Wanna Thank You"	Unknown	Unknown	21 March 2008
26	"My Washing Song"	Michael Towner	Rick Vanes	24 March 2008
27	"School is Cool"	Helen Scott	Keith Brumpton	25 March 2008
28	"United"	Helen Scott	Wayne Jackman	26 March 2008
29	"Make Time for Sharing"	Unknown	Unknown	27 March 2008
30	"Make Some Noise"	Unknown	Unknown	28 March 2008
