= Kandidate =

British soul band

- Origin: United Kingdom
- Genres: Soul
- Years active: 1975–1983
- Label: RAK Records
- Past members: Ferdi Morris; Teeroy Morris; St Lloyd Phillips; Alex Bruce; Phil Fearon; Bob Collins; Jascha Tambiuttu

Kandidate was a British soul band consisting of Ferdi Morris (bass and backing vocals), Teeroy Morris (keyboards and lead vocals), St Lloyd Phillips (drums), Alex Bruce (percussion), Phil Fearon (lead guitar and backing vocals), Bob Collins (guitar/percussion/vocals), and Jascha Tambimuttu (rhythm guitar and backing vocals).

== Overview ==
The band was signed to Vulcan Records, an offshoot of Trojan Records, in 1975; it was made up of members of two previous bands, Hot Wax (who became Hi Tension) and 70% Proof. Although the band's sole single for Vulcan, "I'm Coming (Wait For Me)", failed to chart, the band attracted the attention of Mickie Most, who signed it up to his RAK Records label.

Kandidate released five singles for RAK, four of which made the UK singles charts. Its best position came with "I Don't Wanna Lose You", boosted by its use on the soundtrack of the film Sunburn.

In 1981, after a hiatus to allow the members to concentrate on songwriting, the band left RAK for Polydor Records, and released two further singles, neither of which charted. The band's proposed debut album, Positives, mentioned on the sleeve of the "I Want to Be Yours" single, was shelved when the group split up following these two failures. Phil Fearon formed the band Galaxy.

== Discography ==
=== Singles ===
Year	Single	Peak chart positions	
Year	Single	UK	IRE
1975	"I'm Coming (Wait for Me)"	—	—
1978	"Don't Wanna Say Goodnight"	47	14
1979	"I Don't Wanna Lose You"	11	15
1979	"Girls Girls Girls"	34	26
1980	"I'm Young/Go To Work On You"	—	—
1980	"Let Me Rock You"	58	—
1981	"I Want to Be Yours"	—	—
1982	"Can't Say Bye" (featuring Viscount Oliver)	—	—
"—" denotes releases that did not chart or were not released in that territory.
