= I.O.U. (Freeez song) =

1983 single By Freeez

Single by Freeez

from the album Gonna Get You
- B-side: "I Dub U"; "We Got the Jazz"
- Released: 17 June 1983
- Studio: Unique (New York City)
- Genre: Electro-funk
- Length: 7:50 (12-inch version); 3:49 (7-inch version)
- Label: Beggars Banquet
- Songwriter: Arthur Baker
- Producer: Arthur Baker

Freeez singles chronology
"One to One" (1982)	"I.O.U." (1983)	"Pop Goes My Love/Scratch Goes My Dub" (1983)

Freeez singles chronology
"Train of Thoughts" (1985)	"I.O.U." (remix) (1987)	"Southern Freeez" (remix) (1987)

"I.O.U." is a song by British musical group Freeez, released in 1983. The song was written and produced by Arthur Baker and remixed by Jellybean Benitez and Baker. The song was an international hit, reaching number two on the UK Singles Chart, making the top ten in many European charts and topping the US Billboard Dance/Disco chart. It was the 20th-best-selling single of 1983 in the United Kingdom.

The accompanying video featured children with skateboards and BMX bicycles recreating New York hip-hop culture.

In 1986, a 12-inch single was released in the US by the Criminal Records company, with new remixes. Some of these remixes were given a re-release during 1987 in the UK for the Citybeat label as "I.O.U. (The Ultimate Mixes '87)", however, it only reached number 23 on the UK Singles Chart.

== Samples ==
The song has been sampled multiple times. Cutfather & Joe used a sample for their remix of Brandy's 2002 single "Full Moon"; Cheryl Cole for the song "Let's Get Down" from her 2010 album Messy Little Raindrops as does Wawa for the remix of StoneBridge's 2007 single "S.O.S". Jamie xx uses a vocal sample for the song "Girl", which closes his debut solo album In Colour. In 2019, Detroit rapper BabyTron of ShittyBoyz used this sample for the song "Jesus Shuttlesworth", the third track off his debut album Bin Reaper. In 2021, DJ/producer Paolo Pellegrino sampled "I.O.U." in a song rewritten together with singer Shibui, titled "Destiny".

== Track listings ==
=== 1983 releases ===
7-inch vinyl

- UK: Beggars Banquet / BEG 96
- Germany, Netherlands: Virgin / 105 535
- US: Streetwise / SWRL-1110
- Australia: Powderworks / POW 0146

Side one
No.	Title	Length
1.	"I.O.U."	3:48

Side two
No.	Title	Length
1.	"I Dub U"	4:38

- Japan: Victor / VIPX-1742

Side one
No.	Title	Length
1.	"I.O.U."

Side two
No.	Title	Length
1.	"Pop Goes My Love"

12-inch vinyl

- UK: Beggars Banquet / BEG 96(T)
- Germany, France: Virgin / 600 902
- Australia: Powderworks / POWT 0146
- Spain: Beggars Banquet / F-600902
- Canada: Vertigo / SOVX 2327

Side one
No.	Title	Length
1.	"I.O.U." (Megamix)	8:43

Side two
No.	Title	Length
1.	"I Dub U"	7:37
2.	"We Got the Jazz"	4:04

- UK: Beggars Banquet / BEG 96TA

Side one
No.	Title	Length
1.	"I.O.U." (Megamix)	8:43

Side two
No.	Title	Length
1.	"I.O.U." (Accapella Mix)	4:03
2.	"We Got the Jazz"	4:04

- US: Streetwise / SWRL 2210 (some with second track on side two)

Side one
No.	Title	Length
1.	"I.O.U."	7:50

Side two
No.	Title	Length
1.	"I. Dub. U."	7:49
2.	"Acapella U." (not on all releases)	2:50

=== 1986 releases ===
12-inch vinyl

- US: Criminal / CRIM 00007

Side one
No.	Title	Length
1.	"I.O.U." (Ultimate Club, Vocal Mix)	8:00
2.	"I.O.U." (Ultimate Drumapella)	4:10

Side two
No.	Title	Length
1.	"I.O.U." (Ultimate Shakedown Gogo, Vocal Mix)	6:37
2.	"I.O.U." (Ultimate Club, Dub Mix)	6:50

=== 1987 releases ===
7-inch vinyl

- UK: City Beat / CBE 709

Side one
No.	Title	Length
1.	"I.O.U." (Club Vocal Edit)	3:55

Side two
No.	Title	Length
1.	"I.O.U." (Shakedown Vocal Edit)	3:55

- Sweden: City Beat / BB 7105

Side one
No.	Title	Length
1.	"I.O.U." (Shakedown)	3:55

Side two
No.	Title	Length
1.	"I.O.U." (Club)	4:00

12-inch vinyl

- UK: City Beat / CBE 1209
- France: Virgin / 80291
- Germany: Virgin / 608 897

Side one
No.	Title	Length
1.	"I.O.U." (Ultimate Club Dub Mix)	6:32
2.	"I.O.U." (Ultimate Club Vocal Mix)	6:02

Side two
No.	Title	Length
1.	"I.O.U." (Ultimate Shakedown Vocal Mix)	6:37
2.	"I.O.U." (Ultimate Shakedown Instrumental Mix)	5:18

- Sweden: City Beat / BB 8105

Side one
No.	Title	Length
1.	"I.O.U." (Ultimate Shakedown Vocal Mix)	6:40
2.	"I.O.U." (Ultimate Shakedown Instrumental Mix)	5:25

Side two
No.	Title	Length
1.	"I.O.U." (Ultimate Club Vocal Mix)	6:10
2.	"I.O.U." (Ultimate Club Dub Mix)	6:35

== Personnel ==
- John Rocca – vocals, hand percussion, bongos, congas
- Peter Maas – bass guitar, vocals
- Everton McCalla – drums, vocals
- Tina B – vocals
- Andy Stennett – piano
- Fred Zarr – piano
- Cosa – bongos, congas
- Arthur Baker – music and lyrics, production, mix, remix
- John "Jellybean" Benitez – mix
- John Robie – mix, remix

Additional personnel for 1986/87 versions

- Richard Scher – co-production
- Graeme Durham – editor
- Tim Palmer – editor
- Arthur Baker – remix
- Jay Burnett – remix
- John Rocca – remix
- Latin Rascals – remix
- Raul Soto – remix

== Charts ==
=== Weekly charts ===
Chart (1983)	Peak position
Australia (Kent Music Report)	3
Belgium (Ultratop 50 Flanders)	3
Canada Top Singles (RPM)	38
Finland (Suomen virallinen lista)	13
France (IFOP)	4
Iceland (Dagblaðið Vísir)	1
Ireland (IRMA)	5
Israel (Kol Yisrael)	5
Netherlands (Dutch Top 40)	2
Netherlands (Single Top 100)	2
New Zealand (Recorded Music NZ)	4
South Africa (Springbok Radio)	3
Sweden (Sverigetopplistan)	12
Switzerland (Schweizer Hitparade)	5
UK Singles (Official Charts)	2
US Dance/Disco Top 80 (Billboard)	1
US Hot Black Singles (Billboard)	13
West Germany (GfK)	8

Chart (1987)	Peak position
Ireland (IRMA)	26
UK Singles (Official Charts)	23
US 12-inch Singles Sales (Billboard)	37
US Dance/Disco Club Play (Billboard)	18

=== Year-end charts ===
Chart (1983)	Position
Belgium (Ultratop)	29
Netherlands (Dutch Top 40)	30
Netherlands (Single Top 100)	40
New Zealand (Recorded Music NZ)	27
UK Singles (OCC)	18
West Germany (GfK)	54

== Certifications ==
Region	Certification	Certified units/sales
United Kingdom (BPI)	Gold	500,000^{^}
^{^} Shipments figures based on certification alone.
