= African Music Machine =

1970s New Orleans funk band

The African Music Machine was a Shreveport funk band, led by Louis Villery, playing in the 1970s. They released several singles which became collector's items. A compilation album Black Water Gold was issued in 2000. The band was re-formed by Villery in 2001, and released an album on the Singular label.

They play mellow beats incorporating traditional African and Caribbean sounds.
