= Chicks Incorporated =

Australian dance rock band

- Origin: Brisbane, Queensland, Australia
- Genres: Pop, funk, disco, rock
- Years active: 1977–1981
- Label: RCA
- Past members: Safanya; Miriam Curtis; Wendy Dowsett; Wendy Knudson; Chris Mitchell; Sue Neilson; Pamela Withnell; Finn Christian; Jennifer Kelly; Danny Patchin; Kim Wheeler; Paula Williams; Peter Wragg

Chicks Incorporated were an Australian dance rock band formed in Brisbane, Queensland, in 1977. Their sound was largely derived from American soul, funk, pop, rock and disco. Starting out as an almost all-female band with guitarist Chris Mitchell being the only male member, they were led by the late drummer Miriam Curtis, who produced their sole album, Security, in 1980. They attracted a lot of local attention due to their sexy appearance and wild dancing.

The band's first single was "Jive To Stay Alive" released on RCA Records, and was also featured on a few disco compilation albums such as Dats Disco on RCA. Most of the band's material was written by well-respected Brisbane songwriters Laurie Stone and Peter Moscos, as well as keyboard player David Bentley, formerly of Python Lee Jackson and best known for the hit "In A Broken Dream" which was sung by Rod Stewart.

The band shortened their name to "Chicks" in 1979, but despite being signed with a major label, they had several problems finding and retaining competent members. Their final appearance on an album was "Stormy Nights" on the compilation That's Queensland issued by radio station 4IP. The song was a departure from their early dance orientated material and geared towards the electro-pop sound of the early 1980s and the band eventually split up.

Bass player Sue Neilson is very active on the Brisbane corporate rock music scene today, whilst Curtis died in early 2012. Her husband Barry Petrel runs the Australian website Baby Boomers Website, and will be creating a page in memory of her musical achievements and service to her country and community. Saxophonist Pamela Withnell joined the Sydney band The Party Girls after her departure from the band, and she now performs on the jazz scene.

== Discography ==
Singles

- 1977 Jive To Stay Alive/Do It (RCA) 103040
- 1978 Inside Information/Let Me Take You There (RCA) 103262
- 1979 I'm On Fire/B Side The C Side (RCA) 103476
- 1980 Movie Star/Can't Take It With Me (RCA) 103685

Albums

- 1980 Security (RCA)
