= David Grant (singer) =

Jamaican-English singer and vocal coach

David Grant MBE
- Born: David Beresford Grant; 8 August 1956 (age 70); Kingston, Colony of Jamaica
- Occupations: Singer; vocal coach
- Years active: 1980–present
- Labels: Chrysalis, Polydor, Fourth & Broadway
- Website: carrieanddavidgrant.co.uk

David Beresford Grant MBE (born 8 August 1956) is an English singer and vocal coach.

== Career ==
Grant became famous in the early 1980s as a member of UK soul/funk duo Linx, whose biggest hit was "Intuition" in 1981. He began a solo career in 1983 with the top 40 hit "Stop and Go". Further hits included "Watching You Watching Me" and two duets with Jaki Graham – "Could It Be I'm Falling in Love", which reached number five in 1985, and the Todd Rundgren-penned "Mated", which made number 20 later that year. He has also worked as a session singer for artists including Diana Ross, Rick Astley and Lighthouse Family.

David has become well known, along with his wife Carrie, as vocal coach on Pop Idol and judge/vocal coach on Fame Academy and its spin-off Comic Relief Does Fame Academy. In addition, he has worked with some of the UK's top pop acts including the Spice Girls, Take That, S Club, and more recently Will Young, Atomic Kitten, Melanie C, Lemar, Charlotte Church, Joss Stone, Geri Halliwell and Julian Perretta.

He also appeared regularly as a panellist on the topical debate show The Wright Stuff. In 2006, he appeared in the four-part series The Sound of Musicals. In September 2006 he appeared on MasterChef. At the start of 2008 David Grant sat as a judge on The One and Only, where he again worked alongside Carrie.

Soon after, David starred as the celebrity 'hider' in an episode of the CBBC show Hider in the House. He is the only celebrity to have been 'discovered' in the first day's filming of the show. This appearance was a precursor to David and Carrie branching out into children's television later in the year, when they hosted their own CBeebies show Carrie and David's Popshop.

Grant often presented episodes of Songs of Praise and is a regular talking head expert for Channel 5 on a number of pop music-based chart countdowns.

== Personal life ==
Grant was born in Kingston, Jamaica, and moved to London as a child in the late 1950s. David and his wife Carrie have four children: Olive, Tylan, Arlo, and an adopted son, Nathan. All of their children are neurodivergent. David and Carrie are both Christian, and run a church plant in their home.

Grant was appointed Member of the Order of the British Empire (MBE) in the 2019 New Year Honours.

== Discography ==
=== Albums ===
Year	Title	UK
1983	David Grant	32
1985	Hopes and Dreams	96
1987	Change	—
1990	Anxious Edge	—
1997	Watching and Waiting (with Carrie Grant)	—
"—" denotes releases that did not chart.

=== Singles ===
Year	Single	Peak chart positions						
Year	Single	BE (FLA)	IRE	NL	NZ	UK	US Dance	US R&B
1982	"Have Yourself a Merry Christmas" (with The Wallace Fields Middle School Choir)	—	—	—	—	—	—	—
1983	"Stop and Go"	—	—	—	38	19	40	75
1983	"Watching You, Watching Me"	—	15	—	—	10	—	—
1983	"Love Will Find a Way"	—	—	—	—	24	—	—
1983	"Rock the Midnight"	—	—	—	—	46	—	—
1984	"Organise"/"Wrap Yourself Around Me"	—	—	—	—	90	—	—
1985	"Could It Be I'm Falling in Love" (duet with Jaki Graham)	23	8	17	48	5	—	60
1985	"Where Our Love Begins"	—	—	—	—	80	—	—
1985	"Mated" (duet with Jaki Graham)	16	23	17	—	20	—	—
1986	"Close to You"	—	—	—	—	—	—	—
1987	"Take Us Back"	—	—	—	—	—	—	—
1987	"Change"	—	—	—	—	55	—	—
1987	"Before Too Long"	—	—	—	—	—	—	—
1988	"Intuition '88"	—	—	—	—	—	—	—
1989	"Life" (featuring Mike Stevens)	—	—	—	—	86	—	—
1990	"Keep It Together"	—	—	—	—	56	—	—
1990	"Life '90" (featuring The Original Double Trouble) (Norman Cook remix)	—	—	—	—	98	—	—
1992	"Hurt"	—	—	—	—	—	—	—
1999	"Shake" (Foreal People featuring David Grant)	—	—	—	—	—	—	—
"—" denotes releases that did not chart or were not released.

== Filmography ==
Year	Title	Role	Notes
1992	Birds of a Feather	Audience member	1 episode
2004	Mysti	Himself	1 episode
2008	Carrie and David's Popshop	Himself	30 episodes
2020	Hollyoaks	Mal	1 episode
