= Summer Soulstice =

UK music festival

Coordinates: 51°38′22″N 0°13′50″W

- Summer Soulstice logo
- Locations: Old Elizabethans Memorial Playing Fields, Barnet, England
- Years active: 2007-present
- Website: www.summersoulstice.co.uk

Summer Soulstice is a U.K. greenfield, soul music event started in 2007 which to date has taken place in the London Borough of Barnet, usually held close to the time of the summer solstice (the longest day in the Northern Hemisphere).

The event was started in the memory of classic soul fan Andy Weekes, who died of cancer, as a tribute by his family and friends and the festival has been made into an annual event at local venues.

It is a non-profit event organised by volunteers, with proceeds going to a local charity Cherry Lodge Cancer Care. The event is best known for soul DJ's and live acts such as Beggar and Co, as well as dance and family entertainment. The first event was held at Barnet Elizabethans Rugby Football Club, then moved to Old Elizabethans Memorial Playing Fields in Barnet.

The event is broadcast on local radio stations, EN5Radio, Solar Radio and Stomp Radio and is supported by local businesses such as JJ Roofing Supplies, who are now in their sixth year sponsoring the event which sees over 4000 attend.
