= Promenade Park =

Park in Maldon, England

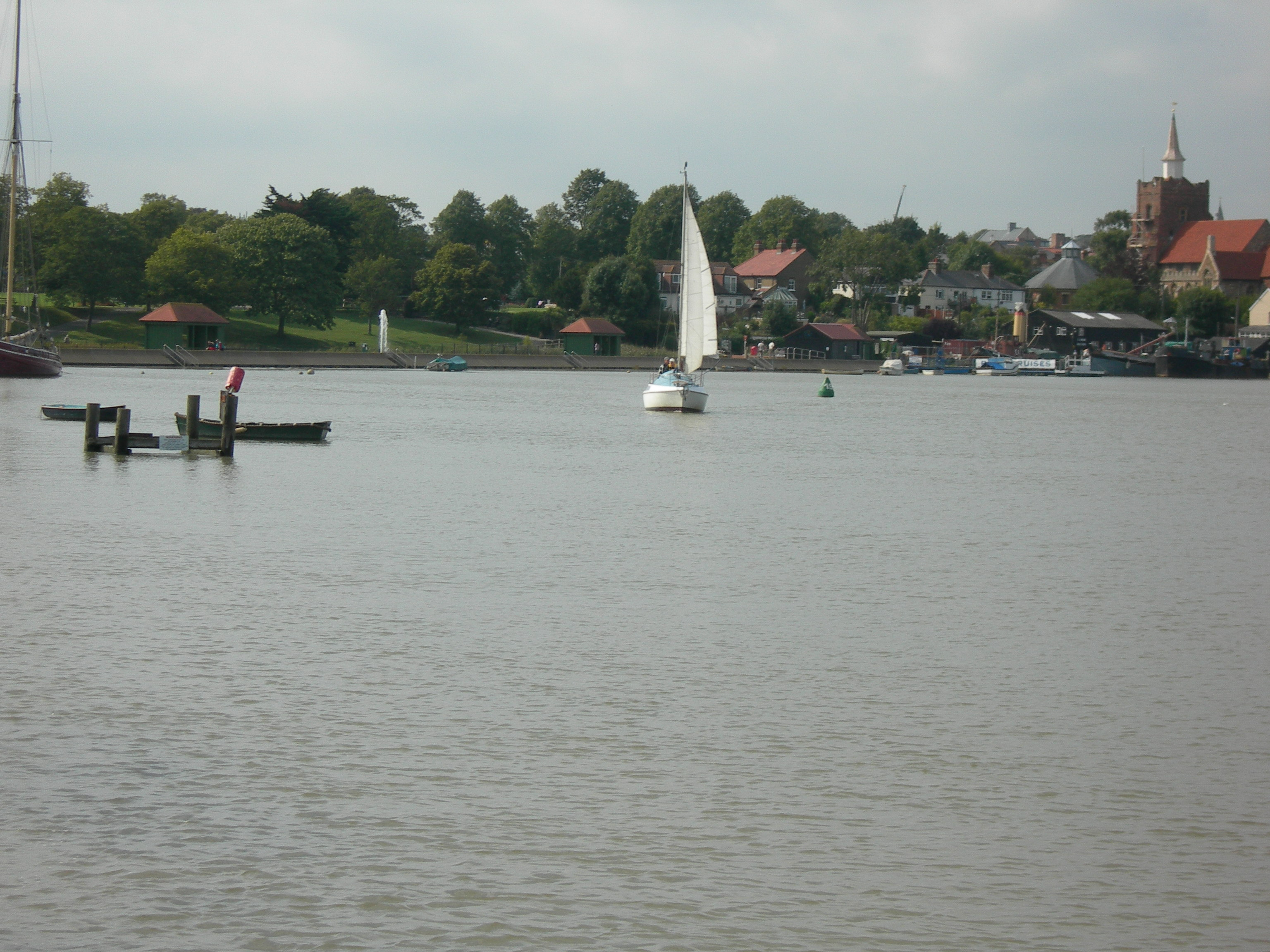
- Interactive map of Promenade Park
- Type: Urban park
- Location: Maldon, Essex, England
- Coordinates: 51°43′38″N 0°41′23″E
- Operator: Maldon District Council
- Open: All year

Promenade Park is the premier urban park in Maldon, Essex, England.

== History ==
The park is Victorian and was opened in 1895 to provide the people of Maldon with a green space. The original park lodge has been converted into Maldon Museum. Maldon Marine Lake was created in 1905, and greatly added to the attraction of the area as a location for outdoor swimming. In 2002, there was a fatality at the lake, and unable to afford lifeguards, the district council banned swimming. In 2017, there was a petition for the return of swimming at the lake.

== Facilities ==
There is an ornamental lake with fountains, an amphitheatre, a splash park, a children’s play area, a lake for model boating, and riverside walks. This area also includes dedicated picnic areas with picnic tables, formal gardens with a pergola, sports pitches and changing rooms, skateboarding and BMX areas and three separate toilet blocks including disabled facilities.

== Events ==
Maldon parkrun takes place every Saturday morning in the park. Maldon Mud Race takes place each year and involves racing through 550m of mud.
