= Southern Freeez (song) =

1981 single by Freeez

Single by Freeez

from the album Southern Freeez
- Released: 30 January 1981
- Recorded: 1980
- Studio: Vineyard Studios, London
- Genre: Brit funk; jazz-funk; funk; post-disco; sophisti-pop
- Length: 5:40 (LP version)
- Label: Beggars Banquet (UK)
- Songwriters: Andy Stennett, John Rocca, Peter Maas
- Producer: John Rocca

Freeez singles chronology
"Stay" / "Hot Footing It" (1980)	"Southern Freeez" (1981)	"Flying High" (1981)

"Southern Freeez" produced by John Rocca is the first single released by British dance band Freeez from their debut album, also entitled Southern Freeez. The album was self-funded by member John Rocca and initially released on his Pink Rhythm record label before the group was signed to Beggars Banquet.

== Song information ==
Freeez gained far higher recognition and sales with this record than with the previous singles "Keep in Touch" (which reached number 49 in the UK sales charts) and its follow-up "Stay"/"Hot Footing It". "Southern Freeez" reached number one in the blues and soul chart and spent two weeks at number 8 of the UK Singles Chart during early 1981.

Guest Ingrid Mansfield Allman provided vocals. The titular Southern Freeez is attested to derive from a dance move, "The Freeze," used by clubbers in the "Royalty" club, Southgate in the early 1980s. A then-popular song, "The Groove" by Rodney Franklin, has moments where the band drops out for a bar, and a style of freezing movement at these points took hold.

=== Remix ===
"Southern Freeez (Remix)"

Single by Freeez
- Released: September 1987
- Genre: House, Synth-pop, Soul
- Label: Total Control Records (UK); Warner Bros./FMR (Worldwide)
- Songwriters: Andy Stennett, John Rocca, Peter Maas

Freeez singles chronology
"I.O.U. (remix)" (1987)	"Southern Freeez (Remix)" (1987)

In 1987, the song was remixed and re-released by the label Total Control. The remix reached number 63 in the UK Singles Chart.

== Cover versions ==
UK soul singer Beverley Knight covered "Southern Freeez" for her 2011 album Soul UK. A cover also appeared on the album Brasil Bam Bam Bam (2014) by Sonzeira, a band formed by Gilles Peterson with Emanuelle Araujo and Valerie Etienne on vocals. UK garage producer Sunship released a cover of the song in 2025.

== Track listing ==
=== UK single (1981 version) ===
1. "Southern Freeez" - 5:40
2. "Southern Freeez (LP Version)"

=== UK single (1987 version) ===
1. "Southern Freeez (Dance Mix)"
2. "Southern Freeez (Avenger Mix)"
3. "Southern Freeez (7" Edit)"

== Charts ==
=== 1981 ===
Chart (1981)	Peak position
Ireland (IRMA)	18
UK Singles (Official Charts)	8

=== 1987 ===
Chart	Peak position
UK	#63

== Credits ==
=== Production ===
John Rocca

=== Musicians ===
- John Rocca (percussion, vocals)
- Peter Maas (bass)
- Andy Stennet (keyboards)
- Paul Morgan (drums)
- Gordon Sullivan (electric guitar)
- Ingrid Mansfield Allman (vocals)

=== Song ===
- Written by John Rocca, Peter Maas and Andrew Stennett

== See also ==
- Freeez discography
- List of post-disco artists and songs
