= Brit funk =

Music genre

- Stylistic origins: Funk; R&B; soul; reggae; jazz; post-disco
- Cultural origins: Late 1970s, United Kingdom

Other topics
- List of funk musicians

Brit funk (or Britfunk) is a musical style that has its origins in the British music scene of the late 1970s and which remained popular into the 1980s. It mixes elements from jazz, funk, soul, urban dance rhythms and pop hooks. The scene originated in southern England and spread with support from DJs including DJ Froggy, Greg Edwards, Robbie Vincent, Chris Hill and Colin Curtis. Major funk acts included Jimmy James and the Vagabonds, Average White Band, Ian Dury & the Blockheads, Carl Douglas, Hot Chocolate, Incognito, the Delegation, Hi-Tension, Light of the World, Level 42, Central Line, the Pasadenas, Beggar and Co and Soul II Soul. The genre also influenced 1980s new wave/pop groups such as Culture Club, Bow Wow Wow, Pigbag, Dexys Midnight Runners, Haircut 100 and Tears for Fears.

== Name and characteristics ==
The term Brit funk evolved from the club DJs and James Hamilton of Record Mirror whose column had a major influence in launching new records. Brit funk was a fusion of R&B, funk, soul music rhythms. Pioneers of this sound, groups Hi-Tension and Light of the World, had a British twist to their instrumentation and vocals, avoiding American accents. The emerging punk rock scene has also been cited as an influence by Brit funk musicians: Jean-Paul 'Bluey' Maunick, guitarist with Light of the World and subsequently leader of Incognito, said that the energy of punk and a lack of musical experience led to his attempts to emulate the "slick funk" of 1970s American soul and jazz-funk acts turning into a sound "somewhere between that and a guy that’s just thrashing a guitar", whilst John Rocca of Freeez - who were signed by punk label Beggars Banquet Records - also drew parallels between the two scenes. Hi-Tension co-founder Paul McLean has also suggested that the Caribbean roots of many Brit funk musicians also influenced their music, resulting in "a looser rhythm (and) hints of reggae in the sound".

== History ==
The British funk scene developed from the Home Counties, principally Essex at Lacy Lady in Ilford and The Goldmine on Canvey Island, along with clubs such as Crackers and the 100 Club on London's Oxford Street, Royalty in the London suburb of Southgate and Frenchies in Camberley, Surrey. According to 'Bluey' Maunick, the club scene attracted "a real mix of Black kids and white kids getting on in a surrounding that they all enjoyed, where they could be themselves", helping to break down the racial barriers which he had grown up with. In the South DJ Chris Hill and his Funk Mafia were pioneers, and in the North Colin Curtis, among others, were instrumental in its growth in popularity. Although the scene enjoyed significant underground popularity – a 1980 all-day event at Knebworth featuring Light of the World attracted 12,000 people – it attracted little mainstream media attention outside of Robbie Vincent's show on BBC Radio London: the BBC did produce Black Current, a TV pilot featuring Hi-Tension which was intended to launch a show conceived as a British equivalent of Soul Train, but this was not picked up for a full series.

Jimmy James & the Vagabonds recorded Brit funk song "Disco Fever". Princess gained UK hit "Say I'm Your No.1". With support from the club disc jockeys and labels such as Ensign Records and Elite Records, 80s artists including Light of the World, Level 42 enjoyed chart success and made regular appearances on BBC's flagship pop programme Top of the Pops. The first hit was "Hi Tension" by Hi-Tension. The biggest hits in the genre were "British Hustle" by Hi-Tension (which reached number 8 in 1978) and "Southern Freeez" by Freeez (which reached number 8 in 1981). Light of the World split and members formed Beggar and Co and Incognito.

"Hits in the US R&B chart" by black British artists included Carl Douglas, Delegation, Hot Chocolate, Jaki Graham, Central Line, Loose Ends, and Junior(Junior Giscombe). With DJs gaining cult status, the scene also created many 'club hits' which never achieved commercial success. Many British based soul and dance bands found themselves merging under the Brit funk banner. These included Central Line and Second Image.

Another portion of the Brit funk scene emerged from the light entertainment circuit with a number of acts performing cabaret, working men's clubs, and US army base venues during the early 1970s. Many of these Black British groups masqueraded as American acts, performing covers in the style of American performers. National exposure for these acts was sometimes achieved through television programmes such as Opportunity Knocks and New Faces as was the case for the Manchester group, Sweet Sensation. These programmes served as the gateway from the light entertainment scene into the British music industry.

Britfunk was an instrumental form of expression in developing Black British identity, particularly among young people. Author Robert Strachan explains the demographic as "the generation of young black people who were the first to be born in the United Kingdom found their expression through the adaptation of emergent African-American music to a particularly British context" (Strachan 69). Brit funk helped this generation of young people find their own unique sound and in doing so explore their own unique identities. While Brit funk drew heavy influence from American music, the young and diverse demographic spearheading the genre created a much more inclusive and fluid space. As a result, the music itself was much less worked than American funk and as Strachan describes found its "stylistic variation through naivety" (Strachan 68).

== Influence ==
1980s pop groups such as Haircut 100 and Wham! tapped into the style and sound to help launch their careers. This scene was significant in reducing racial boundaries in the clubs and raised the profile of black and white musicians working together, notably Spandau Ballet who collaborated with Beggar and Co to produce the hit single "Chant Number One". Following the song's success Beggar and Co provided brass for other artists. According to Maunick, during Spandau Ballet's early days they watched Light of the World's rehearsals and asked them for musical advice. During the success of the jazz and Brit funk period, "chanting" became popular in discothèques and nightclubs. This football crowd style of interacting with the music continues in British clubs today. Hi-Tension's Patrick McLean has said that their frequent use of chanting was influenced by the early 1970s glam rock which they had grown up with.

Inspired by soul, jazz, hip-hop and funk, Brit funk exploded onto the scene in the 1980s, one of the first times black artists (primarily of Caribbean descent) received mainstream success in the UK. Between 1980 and 1983, in particular, many Brit funk acts came into the scene. However, what separated these British artists from Americans is widely debated. Some theories include a unique British wit/humor, inspiration from Euro fashion, stripped down aesthetics, and accents. However, a popular theory is that Brit funk's success in the British mainstream is due to its classification as pop music with lighter themes that are less concerned with the politics and identity found in reggae. Songs like Linx's "You're Lying" (1980), Beggar and Co's "Somebody Help Me Out" (1981) and Central Line's "Walking into Sunshine" (1981) appealed to those who wanted either relationship or sociopolitical commentary. Major labels' choices to market mostly love songs marked a larger gender divide. It was incredibly rare to find female musicians; however, female vocalists were often essential to the integration of "soul" vibes into the funky melody. Beyond this vocally feminine sound, the way consumers heard Brit funk shifted as the role of live performance joined the popularity of the 1970s DJ in clubs. By the 1980s, it was common for clubs to bring in Brit funk performers alongside DJs incorporating both an open and intimate space on the dancefloor. Brit funk was marked by these dualities: feminine and masculine, pleasure and politics, exclusionary and accessible. In 2017, former members of Hi-Tension, Light of the World and Beggar & Co formed a new band, The Brit Funk Association and began reviving the genre performing a repertoire from their respective catalogues.

Robert Strachan's "Britfunk: Black British Popular Music, Identity and the Recording Industry in the Early 1980s" highlights Britfunk's history as well as how Black music in the UK intersects with race, class, politics, nationality, culture, and gender. To start, Britfunk was significant for expressing Black British identity and drew from a range of African American music genres such as soul, jazz, electro, and hip-hop. the musical genres embodied by Britfunk are not bound by the borders and cultures of the Caribbean, which is where Black Britishness is most strongly linked. As a result of Britfunk's unboundedness, it was able to spark "fluidity of identity and space where strict cultural boundaries in terms of identity, gender and ethnicity could be negotiated, blurred and articulated" (Strachan 69). Moreover, in the construction of Black British identity, Britfunk was less like reggae in the sense that it had less "conscious engagement with politics and identity" and more elements of mainstream pop.

More recently, Tyler, the Creator acknowledged the influence of Brit funk on his work when he gave his acceptance speech for the Brit Award for International Male Solo Artist at the 2020 Brit Awards.

=== Continuities between Brit funk and disco ===
Gaining inspiration from various musical genres, Brit funk continued and built off of technological and symbolic themes present in U.S. disco. Author Robert Strachan described that Brit funk became recognised for its "use of electronic production, drum machines, electronic bass and the stripped down aesthetic of electro presented a slick, ultra-modern musical aesthetic combined with visual codes accessed from American disco acts." Furthermore, Brit funk seemed to follow in disco's footsteps in regard to expression of gender and sexuality. Writers including Tim Lawrence, Bill Brewster and Frank Broughton discussed how disco ushered in a unique moment in which gender and sexuality queerness gained "recognition" in mainstream music. The disco genre fostered a culture that highlighted and celebrated a sense of fluidity and "multipleness" that was revolutionary in its day. Like disco, Brit funk also represented a unique moment of fluidity in gender expression and sexuality. Britfunk was emerging in a time in the UK in which gender-play was entering the mainstream pop scene from strains of UK club scenes and formed around unique identity politics. Such politics were highly entangled with pleasure on the dance floor which was the essence of U.S. disco as well. Such pleasure in both Brit funk (and disco) was ambiguous, "in terms of gender and sexuality ..." Strachan said that many Brit funk artists "were clearly drawing upon outré and undoubtedly gay styles that had emerged in the club scenes", and the aesthetics of Brit funk can now "... be read as escaping fixed notions of identity."

== See also ==
- Ska
- Bob Marley
- Motown
