= Southern Freeez (album) =

Studio album by Freeez
- Released: 1980
- Genre: Jazz-funk, post-disco
- Label: Beggars Banquet
- Producer: John Rocca

Freeez chronology
Southern Freeez (1980)	Gonna Get You (1983)

Southern Freeez is the debut album by the British jazz-funk band Freeez, first released in late 1980 by John Rocca on his Pink Rhythm record label. After signing to Beggars Banquet, the album was re-released on 30 January 1981.

In 2020, Beggars Banquet released a remastered version of the album as part of a double album titled Southern Freez/Variations on a Theem, the second part of which contains new recordings by Rocca, including a new version of the track "Southern Freeez" itself.

== Track listing ==
All songs written by Freeez except where noted.

1. "Mariposa" - 5:40
2. "Caribbean Winter" - 5:15
3. "Easy On The Onions" - 2:37
4. "Sunset" - 4:38
5. "Flying High" (Peter Maas) - 5:30
6. "Southern Freeez" (Andy Stennett, John Rocca, Peter Maas) - 5:40
7. "Roller Chase" - 5:07
8. "First Love" - 4:22
9. "Finale" - 1:59

== Personnel ==
=== Freeez ===
- John Rocca - percussion, vocals
- Peter Maas - bass guitar, vocals
- Andy Stennett - keyboard
- Paul Morgan - drums

=== Additional musicians ===
- Geoff Warren - saxophone, flute
- David Allison - trombone
- Lawrie Brown - trumpet
- Gordon Sullivan - guitar
- Andy Stennett - horns arrangement

=== Engineers ===
- Simon Sullivan
- Paul Burry

=== Special ===
- Ingrid Mansfield Allman - vocals (on track no. 6)

== Charts ==
Title	Chart positions
Title	UK Albums
Southern Freeez	#17

== See also ==
- Freeez
- John Rocca
- Southern Freeez
