= Ensign Records =

British record label, 1976–1991

- Parent company: Chrysalis Records (1984–1991); EMI (1991–2012); Parlophone Label Group (2012–2013); Warner Music Group (2013–2016); Blue Raincoat Music (2016–present); Reservoir Media Management (2019–present); Universal Music Group (pre-1984 catalogue)
- Founded: 1976; 50 years ago
- Founder: Nigel Grainge
- Status: Defunct
- Distributors: Reservoir Media Management (post-1984 catalogue); EMI Records (post-2020)/Mercury Records (pre-1984 catalogue)
- Genre: Various
- Country of origin: UK

Ensign Records was a record label started in 1976 by London-born Nigel Grainge, elder brother of UMG Chairman Sir Lucian Grainge.

== History ==
Nigel Grainge began his career in the record business as a sales office assistant at Phonogram UK in 1970. After a promotion to US-affiliated labels manager, he was responsible for the marketing and chart success of many hits by acts such as Faron Young, The Detroit Emeralds, The Stylistics, Chuck Berry, Rod Stewart (switching "Maggie May" from an original 'B' side), and eventually became the company's head of A&R from 1974 to 1976. He directly signed Thin Lizzy, 10cc, The Steve Miller Band, and a worldwide license for the successful All Platinum label (hits by Shirley & Co, the Moments, etc.), among others, before deciding to leave and set up his own independent label, funded by Phonogram Inc., which distributed it.

Ensign had early success with The Boomtown Rats in 1977, who went on to have 13 UK Top 20 entries including two at number 1 – "Rat Trap" and "I Don't Like Mondays". Ensign also had a constant stream of UK and European hits with Flash and the Pan, Eddy Grant, Light of the World, and Phil Fearon & Galaxy. Grainge's cohort throughout the life of the label was London DJ Chris Hill.

Grainge sold the company to Chrysalis Records in 1984 and continued to run it from their offices in Notting Hill until the mid-1990s. The roster had reached its most credible peak with Sinéad O'Connor, The Waterboys, World Party, and the Blue Aeroplanes. The Waterboys' contract with Ensign expired in 1991.

By 1990, millions of records had been sold by O'Connor, the biggest success being "Nothing Compares 2 U" which hit number one in over 30 countries.

After EMI acquired Chrysalis Records in 1991, Grainge felt stifled by the corporate changes and requested to leave the company, and the label was folded into its parent.

With the acquisition of the EMI group by Universal in 2012, the ownership of the Ensign catalogue of artists was transferred to Parlophone/Warner Music Group, and in 2016 Ensign and Chrysalis were acquired by Blue Raincoat Music.

Chris Hill continues to DJ in the London area, and Grainge relocated to Santa Monica, California in 2002, where he co-founded cultural search-engine TunesMap, owned by G. Marq Roswell, and worked as a special advisor on the HBO series Vinyl. He died, at age 70, on 11 June 2017.

== See also ==
- List of record labels
