= DJ Froggy =

- Born: Steve Howlett; November 8, 1950; Whitechapel, East London, England
- Died: 28 March 2008 (aged 57) Ilford, Essex, England
- Genres: Disco, soul
- Occupation: Disc jockey
- Years active: 1971-2008

Steven Howlett (8 November 1950 – 28 March 2008), aka DJ Froggy, was an English DJ who worked as a 'beatmixer DJ' on the British club music scene in the 1970s, 1980s and 1990s. He was a member of the Soul Mafia group of DJs which included Robbie Vincent, Greg Edwards, Jeff Young and Chris Hill.

== Career ==
=== Early years ===
Born Steven Howlett in Whitechapel, east London, the son of Jean and Kenneth Howlett. His father worked as a mechanical engineer at the electrical equipment manufacturer Plessey in Ilford. His mother died in 1956 when he was only 7 years old. Educated at Dane Secondary School in Ilford, he became fascinated by sound equipment, in particular the radiogram that his father brought home from work.

He undertook his apprenticeship as an engineer at 15 and took the City and Guilds qualification, and was responsible for chairing the Apprentice Association. He put on his own shows using a sound system built by himself.

=== DJing ===
In 1971 he became the resident DJ at The Robin Hood in Dagenham (on Thursdays) and the Birdcage, in Romford. It was here that the name DJ Froggy was created. He became known as 'Froggy' for his habit of jumping up and down in time to the music.

He was taken on by popular music act manager George Cooper in 1972, and offered the DJ accompaniment for bands including acts such as Sweet, Slade and T. Rex, quite often at big venues such as Scunthorpe Baths. He met up with BBC Radio 1 DJ Emperor Rosko, who came to fame through pirate radio in the 1960s. Froggy was inspired by the quality of Rosko's sound system. As a result, he upgraded his own sound system, and went in search of Mat Mathias who set up the Huddersfield company Matamp based in Yorkshire and was the designer of the mixing console owned by Rosko. Mathias and Froggy then decided to co-design their own consoles.

In 1974, BBC Radio 1 disc jockey Dave Lee Travis (known to his followers as the 'Hairy Monster') suggested a collaboration. Between 1974 and 1978 their act, which Travis described as 'verging on cabaret', toured Britain. Later Froggy decided to quit and focus on disco, soul and jazz-funk music. He took on several club dates in the south of England and in late 1978 started a weekly residency (Fridays/Saturdays) at the Royalty, in Southgate, north London. He then progressed on to Purley and the National Soul Festival.

In 1978 he incorporated his sound system at one of Britain's first soul "all-dayers", the National Soul Festival in Purley and a year later in 1979 he became DJ at the first "Caister Soul Weekender" based in Great Yarmouth. He worked alongside DJs which included Robbie Vincent, Chris 'Rent-a-Santa' Hill, Greg Edwards of Capital Radio's 1970s/1980s 'Soul Spectrum' programme fame and Jeff Young who all became known as the 'Soul Mafia'. Froggy then went on to the Prestatyn soul weekender when Original Caister Promoter Adrian Webb moved the Event to Wales. His use of tape recorders and mixing decks alongside his own sound system and the mixing consoles which were also designed by himself, were popular with the British club scene and became an introduction to the 1980s rave culture.

According to his obituary in The Guardian, "In 1979 Froggy had visited Billboard magazine's New York disco convention, and there he picked up the theory behind New York's DJs' mixing techniques. He studied the practice at Studio 54 and Paradise Garage, watching DJ Larry Levan synchronising the rhythm of two records, cross-fading to play sections of their sounds simultaneously, while overlaying effects from a third turntable. Levan was presenting familiar music in a unique manner with pauses in the soundtrack introduced, often sparingly, and always at the DJ's instigation.". This method became more and more popular in the 1980s and many DJs used this style in clubs. Froggy was the first person in the UK to own a pair of, the now legendary, Technics SL-1200MK2 turntables. He purchased them in 1979, during a trip to New York City (where they were first released) and had them sent over to England.

Froggy again improved his sound system further and, like Levan, became experienced at cross-fading. It was not long after this that the Soul Mafia, using the system deployed by him, were playing to audiences at Knebworth. His creation continued as a hired-out concern in the mid-1980s 'rare-groove' scene as well as during the early rave movement.

Between 1980 and 1985 just before electro and hip-hop, he was one of the country's 'Technical DJs'.

=== The “Froggy Soundsystem” ===
The “Froggy Soundsystem” which he built himself was so big that he paid for a lorry to transport it and he took on two full-time employees to run and maintain the equipment. At its height, it produced 12,000 Watts of power, which was often run in mono as Froggy felt that this way produced a greater 'wall of sound'. It used up to six stacks of A.S.S. speakers, with a four-way crossover and using Matamp, Studio Master and H&H Mosfet power amplifiers. His connection with Mat Mathias resulted in the production of the Matamp Stereo Supernova mixer (the first in the UK to feature a Crossfader), which alongside the Technics SL-1200MK2 turntables ensured his sound system would become regarded as the best in the UK at the time.

=== BBC Radio 1 and Capital Radio work ===
From the late 1980s Froggy worked with BBC Radio 1 and held responsibility for editing tracks for segments in Peter Powell's 'Summer Groove Feature' show. He later was given record company work and provided extended disco mixes and shortened radio edits of music tracks along with his mixing partner Simon Harris. By the end of the 1980s both acid house and rave culture were reaching their height and Froggy was presenting a regular Saturday night slot on London's Capital Radio 95.8 FM called, "The Froggy Mix".

== Death and annual 'Frogmarch' celebrations ==
Froggy lived in Seven Kings, Ilford, Essex and the surrounding area for most of his life. He died from a brain haemorrhage on 28 March 2008. He was married three times and is survived by two daughters and a son. There is a yearly memorial event in memory of Froggy called 'FROGMARCH' which was started in March 2009 by his two close friends Frostie and John Taylor Sheehan from Soulpower and the Ilford Palais. It was held at The George ll pub/music venue in Hornchurch, Essex and various other venues. When Frostie passed away in 2025 John Taylor Sheehan decided to cancel the event. The event used to attract over 1000 people each year having as many as 40 well known DJs who played music in his honour.
