= Hi-Tension =

British band

- Origin: London, England
- Genres: Brit funk
- Years active: 1971–1984, 2014–present
- Labels: Island Records, EMI, Streetwave
- Members: Paul Philips; Jeffrey Guishard; Paapa Mensah; Patrick McLean; Paul McLean
- Past members: Phil Fearon; David Joseph; Ken Joseph; David Reid; Leroy Williams; Courtney Pine

Hi-Tension are a British band based in North West London, and are pioneers of Brit funk. with the original line-up being Paul Philips (rhythm guitar), Jeff Guishard (percussion & vocals), David Joseph (keyboards, lead vocals), Paul McLean (lead guitar and vocals) Ken Joseph (bass) Patrick McLean (saxophone & vocals), David Reid and Paapa Mensah (both drums) and Leroy Williams. Hi-Tension originally performed as 'Hot Waxx' but due to a legal technicality, they changed the band name to Hi-Tension in 1977. They had hits with the songs "Hi Tension" and "British Hustle", both were top 20 hits in the UK.

== Biography ==
In 1971, the group started as Hot Waxx with original members being Paul Philips, Lloyd Philips, David Joseph and Ken Joseph. In 1975, Phil Fearon (later a member of the bands Galaxy and Kandidate) joined as a member of the group but had later left by 1977. After this, David Joseph recruited other members that lived in the area to join the group.

In 1978 they released their first single aptly named "Hi Tension" that peaked to No. 13 in the UK Singles Chart in May 1978, and topped the Melody Maker disco charts for 5 weeks. They then released a second single titled "British Hustle" which eclipsed their first single and peaked to No. 8 in late 1978. In the same year a short film was subsequently made about British soul music called British Hustle.

By 1981, David Reid, Patrick McLean and Paul McLean left the band. The remaining members of Hi Tension continued and secured another recording contract with EMI records. Whilst touring they recruited Courtney Pine as a session player, playing saxophone during their tour. Subsequently, Paul Philips left the band. From 1983 to 1987 David Joseph secured a solo career and accomplished two hit songs: "You Can't Hide (Your Love from Me)" and "Let's Live It Up (Nite People)".

In 1984, Ken Joseph, Leroy Williams and Jeffrey Guishard remained resilient and secured a further recording contract with Streetwave Records and released the singles "Rat Race" and "You Make Me Happy" in 1984. The latter single was written, produced and arranged by David Pic Conley of the band Surface whom later released a cover version of the song under the title "Happy" for their debut album in 1986.

In 2014, Paul McLean reformed Hi Tension with four original members, Paul Philips, Jeffrey Guishard, Paapa Mensah and his brother Patrick McLean to headline and perform at the Summer Soulstice Festival in Barnet, London.

== Discography ==
=== Studio albums ===
Year	Album	Label	UK
1978	Hi-Tension	Island Records	54
1983	The Joys of Life (only solo album of David Joseph)	Island Records	—

=== Compilation albums ===
- The Best of David Joseph & Hi-Tension (1993)

=== Singles ===
Year	Song	Label	UK
1978	"Hi Tension"	Island Records	13
1978	"British Hustle"	Island Records	8
1978	"Peace on Earth"	Island Records	—
1978	"Autumn Love" / "Unspoken"	Island Records	—
1979	"Funktified"	Island Records	—
1979	"There's a Reason"	Island Records	—
1981	"We've Got the Funk"	EMI	—
1982	"How D'you Feel"	EMI	—
1984	"Rat Race"	Streetwave	83
1984	"You Make Me Happy"	Streetwave	—
"—" denotes releases that did not chart.

=== David Joseph solo singles ===
Year	Song	Label	UK
1983	"You Can't Hide (Your Love from Me)"	Island Records	13
1983	"Let's Live It Up (Nite People)"	Island Records	26
1983	"Be a Star"	Island Records	81
1984	"Joys of Life"	Island Records	61
1987	"No Turning Back"	4th & Broadway	85
