= Greg Edwards (DJ) =

Grenadan radio DJ & broadcaster (born 1947)

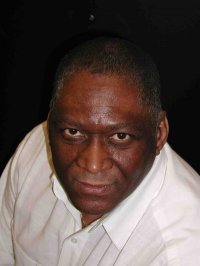
- Edwards in 2015.
- Born: 24 December 1947 (age 78); Grenada, British Windward Islands
- Other names: Buck eyed buddy and refugee from across the sea
- Occupations: Radio Broadcaster and DJ

Greg Edwards (born 24 December 1947) is a British radio broadcaster and DJ. He is well known as the founder of Capital Radio's Soul Spectrum programme (from 1975 onwards) and for the promotion of PIR records and associated artists when it was formed in 1971. He is credited as being a DJ who had a major influence on the promotion of soul and disco music in the UK during the 1970s and 1980s both on radio as well as the club circuit.

== Career ==
=== Early years ===
Edwards was born in Grenada and was raised in New York City,although he moved to the UK in 1968 as he was a club DJ in the North West of England, then moved back in 1971 in order to assist in the running of the newly formed Philadelphia International record label founded by writer-producers Kenneth Gamble and Leon Huff.

Edwards worked during this time as an executive at CBS records, where he was responsible for the marketing and promotion of soul music, with acts such Earth, Wind and Fire, Billy Paul, Lou Rawls and Johnny Nash.

=== Early BBC work, Capital Radio and "Soul Mafia" ===
While still working for CBS, Edwards was approached by BBC radio producer Dave Price to stand in for the Emperor Rosko radio show in 1972. (Rosko had to return to Los Angeles, as his father, Joe Pasternak, was ill.) It was here that Edwards's radio career began, working for BBC Radio 1 on the Saturday noon – 3 pm slot.

It was Edwards's intention to promote soul and jazz music, which had very little UK airplay at that time. He also presented three editions of the long-running music show Top of the Pops during March and April 1974. However, he decided to leave the BBC and work for Capital Radio, a new independent radio station set up in October 1973.

It was at Capital Radio that Edwards worked alongside DJs including the late Kenny Everett, Dave Cash and Chris Tarrant. From the mid-1970s and into the early 1980s, he presented a Saturday early evening programme called Soul Spectrum, which included his "bathroom call", playing music for those who were 'getting ready to go out and party on the town'. Edwards was one of a group of DJs who became stars on the club music scene. They were affectionately known as the "soul mafia", with DJs Chris Hill, Jeff Young, Robbie Vincent and DJ Froggy (Steve Howlett) among them.

Edwards was well known for promoting record labels on his show. He once said: "Buy anything that is issued on the Prelude label." Capital, located in Euston Tower, London, even issued a "Soul Spectrum playlist" each Saturday.

=== Lyceum Ballroom – The Best Disco in Town ===
From the late 1970s through to the early 1980s, Edwards was one of a rotation of DJs to present Capital Radio’s Best Disco in Town, each Friday night, from the Lyceum Ballroom in the Strand, London. The event, which had a capacity of 2,000 people, was also broadcast live on Capital from 11 pm to midnight. Many fans of his DJ'ing formed groups from various parts of London and the surrounding areas when he called out for those from the areas "North, East, South and West" London each week. "The East London Groove Platoon" and "Croydon Cruise Control" were the names of two such groups.

=== Later years – DJ work including "Caister Soul Weekender" and "Soultasia" appearances ===
Edwards has been a regular guest DJ at the Caister Soul Weekender, the UK's largest and longest running soul music event, which dates back to April 1979, taking place at the Vauxhall Holiday Park in Great Yarmouth. These were held twice each year, although due to the Covid-19 outbreak were cancelled in 2020 and 2021.

In May 2015, he took part DJ'ing at the "Happy Days Festival" held at Imber Court, a parkland and recreational facility in East Molesey, Surrey. More recently, he has DJ'd bringing his Soul Spectrum classics to the "Soultasia" event, which featured music from the biggest soul and disco artists of all time. This was held at the Promenade Park, Maldon, Essex, on 24 July 2021 as a "lifetime celebration of soul & disco". He also appeared at the "Berkshire Soultasia" event held at Windsor Racecourse on 13 August 2021.
