= Robbie Vincent =

British radio DJ

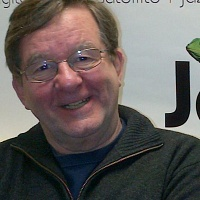
- Born: 9 June 1946 (age 80); Lowestoft, Suffolk, England
- Occupations: English Radio Broadcaster and DJ

Robbie Vincent (born 9 June 1946) is an English radio broadcaster and DJ. As a champion of jazz, funk and soul music in the UK during the late 1970s he made an important contribution both live in clubs and on radio. In 1995 he was voted Independent Radio Personality of the Year at the Variety Club of Great Britain annual awards.

== Career ==
=== Early years ===
The teenaged Robbie Vincent moved up from newspaper messenger boy, aged 15, to print journalist reporting for the Evening Standard on the trial of the notorious gangsters, the Kray twins, and from the troubles in Northern Ireland. His broadcasting career began on 6 October 1970, along with fellow DJ David Simmons, at BBC Radio London, newly founded as one legitimate answer to Britain's avalanche of illegal UK pirate radio stations. With a potential audience in Greater London of 7.5million, he was to spend 13 years helping to shape the sound of local FM radio, starting before legal commercial competition arrived.

During the miners' strike of early 1974 and the resulting three-day week that limited the nation's consumption of electricity, Vincent was hosting a new style of show called 'Late Night London' and playing devil's advocate with listeners who called in by telephone to air their problems or opinions. The programme was broadcast late in the evening and was among the first to establish the format for the radio phone-in in the UK. Vincent said on his website, "Prime Minister Ted Heath gifted me the three day week in December 1973 and the early shut down for TV. The BBC Radio London station manager said "yes" to a night time phone in show. As the TV shut down the lights went off, radio really triumphed, and my evening phone in succeeded beyond all expectations." His celebrity interviewees included prime minister Margaret Thatcher, "at her charming best", he says on his own website.

In 1976, Vincent was pursuing his own tastes by also hosting a music show on the same station over Saturday lunchtimes. In his own words: "Moving from a mixed format of Slade, Rod Stewart, Marc Bolan and endless sound-tracks ... soul and jazz began to take over without management really noticing." He played artists such as Evelyn 'Champagne' King and Crown Heights Affair and invited guest soul DJs, such as Chris Hill, Tom Holland, DJ Froggy, Sean French, to play their favourite three records that came hot off the presses that week. The show grew to be considered essential listening by the capital's soul music fans. A year later, in 1977, Vincent was first heard on BBC Radio 1, hosting a soul and disco show on Saturday evenings which was simulcast on VHF/FM at a time when Radio 1 was only broadcast on medium wave most of the time. He returned for another stint in 1978. In 1982 he was again heard nationally presenting the discussion show Talkabout, picking up on the current affairs side of his work at Radio London.

In 1978, such was the growing appetite for soul music that he and the other DJs in what became dubbed the south of England's 'Soul Mafia' staged the first 'Purley all-dayer', a fiercely athletic black-music dance marathon at Tiffany’s in Purley, the London suburb. As a direct response to similar Northern soul all-nighters, it attracted the fanatical 'soul tribes' from across Britain. A year later, Vincent helped instigate the popular Caister Soul Weekender events in the Norfolk holiday park (the first was called '1st National Soul Weekender' in April 1979). The original Soul Mafia DJ line-up was supplemented by Greg Edwards (presenter of Soul Spectrum on Saturday evening on London's Capital Radio), Chris Brown and Jeff Young.

In 1980, Vincent's signature song was "Get It" by The Dramatics and a year later Vincent became manager of UK soul funk band Second Image, securing record deals with Polydor and then in 1984, MCA Records. He acted as their sole personal manager until the band split in 1986. Vincent became part of both a soul revival as well as a move for commercial acceptance of jazz-funk. In addition, the mainstream jazz movement, so often omitted from history, received a significant boost due to unknown and new artists being given a media platform.

Though Vincent was a figurehead in the jazz-funk-soul community, to many thousands of others he was the voice of current affairs phone-ins such as The Robbie Vincent Telephone Programme on BBC Radio London until he left in 1988. Vincent later re-emerged as the phone-in host on LBC's Nightline programme from 11 pm Monday–Friday in the late 1980s.

=== BBC Radio London Saturday show ===
The Robbie Vincent Show acquired a cult following when it was broadcast by Radio London on Saturdays from 1976. The show was broadcast in mono on the station's FM frequency of 94.9 MHz as well as being on MW (medium wave) frequency where it was allocated on 1457 kHz (206 metres) from Brookman's Park.

Many fans made pirate cassette tape recordings, normally from the FM transmissions as MW broadcasts were of poor quality, of the show which was on air from 11:30am to 2pm. He played imports, promos, new releases and the soul anthems that were filling dance-floors at cutting-edge underground clubs such as Flick's in Dartford and The Gold Mine on Canvey Island. For many, Vincent's radio show was the first source for essential listening – resulting in jazz-funk and soul DJs and fans going to specialist shops for a copy of an all-important 12-inch vinyl single or album. Vincent would play a selection of UK and US imports, thus strengthening the sales and reach of the music both in London and further afield.

The show's cult status was such that many fans would travel to locations where even the weakest signal of BBC Radio London could be received – these locations included High Wycombe, Marlow, Luton, Dunstable and even as far north as Northamptonshire. Remarkably, the signal also reached 120 miles west of London to Bath where one listener had set up an FM aerial connected to a Hi-Fi tuner and would record the shows on cassette. The recorded shows were often used as a buying guide to obtain the latest music in the specialist London import shops such as Bluebird Records and Groove Records among others.

In 1983 the Saturday show started to include a Fusion Jazz 40 (which often would mirror the Fusion Few Chart in Blues and Soul magazine). Many import 12-inch singles and albums would not have been officially released in the UK without Robbie Vincent's support. Some of these included tracks by Maze (feat. Frankie Beverly), Brass Construction, Tania Maria, Earl Klugh and Alfie Silas. The first official playing of Lionel Richie's All Night Long was by Vincent on his Saturday show in autumn 1983 as a promo, well ahead of Richie's album Can't Slow Down.

=== Musical artists exposure to the UK market ===
The Guardian newspaper described Vincent as one of the 1980s' 'taste-making DJs', who helped US jazz-funk combo, Maze with Frankie Beverly, to gain a cult following in the UK. He was one of the few British radio presenters to have interviewed Marvin Gaye. The Saturday show standard format would be displaced by Vincent's popular 'All Winners Show' where the fans would choose the tracks to be played. On 16 October 1982, one such All Winners Show unearthed a long lost jazz-funk band called Prince Charles and the City Beat Band and within weeks, their song 'In The Streets' was re-released in the UK. The band went on to have a renewed career in the next few years and UK hits. On the same show, The Trammps 'Soul Bones' was played resulting in a scurry to find deleted copies of this forgotten soul classic. On the same show, a composite of Merry Clayton's 'When The World Turns Blue', John Klemmer's 'Adventures in Paradise' and Teena Marie's 'Portuguese Love' was a sequence which has remained as a memorable highlight.

Other notable successes as a result of Vincent's UK airplay included Gilberto Gil and Sadao Watanabe. Vincent was also the first DJ to play Teena Marie's comeback recording in 1983 called 'Fix It' following her signing from Motown Records to Epic. Careers previously restricted to the US and Latin America were given prime exposure on Vincent's show, including Phyllis Hyman, Angela Bofill and Brenda Russell.

Established artists looking for new directions also received some focus including Herbie Hancock (Vincent declined to play Rockit but did play 'Autodrive') and Fatback Band (their International hit 'The Girl Is Fine (So Fine)'. He also gave exclusive UK exposure to Fatback's spin-off act C-Brand in 1983 ('Wired For Games' by C Brand was re-released in 2015). For the UK scene, Vincent supported Second Image, I-Level, and early 12-inch singles from Loose Ends. In spring 1983, Vincent played a 7-inch single by unknown funk band Mtume – the song 'Juicy Fruit' became a successful UK hit, being released as an extended 12-inch single largely as a result of Vincent's promotion.

=== BBC Radio 1 Sunday evening soul show ===
Vincent moved to BBC Radio 1 on New Year's Day 1984 to present The Sound of Sunday Night which became a popular Sunday evening soul show between 9 and 11pm, carried on Radio 2's national FM transmitter (88 – 91 MHz) as well as the regular 275/285 metres medium-wave frequencies. He presented these until 1989, playing jazz-funk with artistes like Rick James, The Fatback Band, Brass Construction, Funkadelic, The Crusaders, Ronnie Laws and Eddie Henderson.

By 1987 his show was on Radio1 FM on a Saturday night, between 7pm and 9pm. The final show was on 30 December 1989, and was a best of 1989 called Killer Cuts part 2. Killer Cuts Part 1 had been aired on 23 December 1989.

He would often present the shows with his own laconic slant by introducing records with remarks such as 'This one has a government meltability warning', 'Carefully selected so that only the best reach the turntable' and 'Open the fridge door and make sure it's packed with ice'.

=== London Broadcasting Company (LBC) and Kiss FM ===
In 1989 Vincent moved to work for LBC radio. His night-time phone-in show was one of the highest rated programmes on the station. In 1995 Vincent's personality won him a Variety Club award. As Radio 2 began to modernise, he briefly was heard on the station in the autumn of 1997 but this did not last. After a spell at Kiss FM, from February 1998 he hosted the breakfast show on London's Jazz FM although left when the management changed at the end of 2002.

=== Television ===
In 1986 Vincent was also seen on British TV screens when he co-hosted BBC Breakfast TV's Hospital Watch (also updating later in the afternoon) alongside Debbie Thrower, Maggie Philbin and Frank Bough. That same year he also presented a TV programme called Go for it. The programme invited 'middle class families' to lose weight on national television via “simple” challenges.

=== CD Commission and Solar Radio ===
In 1994, Vincent was commissioned to compile a CD, Classic Jazz-funk 5, for the Mastercuts series of compilations. Titled The Robbie Vincent Edition, it featured many of the tracks he was one of the first to air on the radio in London, ranging from Grover Washington, Roy Ayers and Gabor Szabo to Blue Feather and OPA.

Vincent spent most of 2003 travelling and during late December and early January 2004 he presented five daytime shows on 94.9 BBC Radio London.

In 2006 he was occasionally a guest presenter on Tony Monson's 10 am to 1 pm weekday show on Solar Radio in the UK. He jointly presented the show on several occasions when he brought in all the music. More recently, he could be seen and heard at London's Clapham Grand soul nightclub. He DJ'd there along with others such as Chris Hill and DJ Froggy.

=== Recent activities ===
Vincent returned to the airwaves on 12 October 2008 and presented a three-hour show called 'Sunday Morning Soul' on Sundays for the relaunched Jazz FM service on DAB, Sky, Freesat and the web.

Talking in 2011 about his early 'missionary enthusiasm' for soul music, Vincent told The Soul Survivors magazine: "Don't forget, I grew up in an era where Tamla Motown didn't put their artist photographs on the cover sleeves because they were black and they worried they might alienate a white audience."

On 29 November 2013, Vincent announced his decision to leave Jazz FM and was denied a final farewell show on the station following his announcement.

On 8 and 25 May 2020, Vincent reprised his 'soul show' 1980s style with two four hour special programmes on Jazz FM each between 10 am and 2 pm in a Bank Holiday 'Lockdown Special' during the Covid-19 outbreak in the UK. It was announced on 4 December 2020 that Vincent would be presenting a 4 hour 30 minute 'New Year's Eve Special' on Jazz FM from 20.00 on 31 December 2020 to 00.30 on 1 January 2021.

On Sunday 4 April 2021, (Easter Sunday), Vincent returned to Jazz FM to present the first of a series of his Music Garden shows from 1pm to 3pm. Vincent continues to broadcast on Jazz FM with his own show each Sunday between 1pm and 3pm.

Vincent returned as DJ at the Coppid Beech Hotel near Bracknell. The 'If it moves funk it' event took place on 8 November 2024.

== Sources ==
- Robbie Vincent returns to BBC London 94.9FM BBC press release, November 2003
- Robbie Vincent Biography from Radio Rewind
- About Robbie Vincent Vincent's career from 1960s to the 21st century, at his own website
