= Linx (band) =

British soul/funk band

- Origin: United Kingdom
- Genres: Brit funk; soul
- Years active: 1980–1983
- Label: Chrysalis Records
- Past members: David Grant; Junior Giscombe; Bob Carter; Andy Duncan; Canute Edwards; Peter Martin

Linx were a British soul/Brit funk band consisting of David Grant (lead vocals), Bob Carter (keyboards), Andy Duncan (drums), Canute Edwards (guitar), Peter Martin (bass) and Junior Giscombe (backing vocals). Carter and Duncan were session musicians who were known for their contribution to Hazel O'Connor's Breaking Glass album and film.

After their first hit in 1980, the band slimmed down to a duo of Grant and Martin. Peter Martin aka 'Sketch' (the bassist) joined the band 23 Skidoo. Junior Giscombe became a pop singer in his own right.

== Overview ==
Linx had six entries on the UK Singles Chart from mid-1980 until mid-1982. The band's biggest success was "Intuition", which reached number 7 in early 1981. Other hits included "You're Lying" and "So This Is Romance." Linx also contributed the track "Don't Get in My Way" to the influential C81 compilation cassette released by New Musical Express magazine in 1981.

Linx split in early 1983. Grant later had a number of solo hits. Between 2002 and 2003 he was featured as a vocal coach on the BBC TV show Fame Academy.

== Discography ==
=== Studio albums ===
Year	Album	Peak chart positions			Certifications
Year	Album	UK	US	US R&B	Certifications
1981	Intuition	8	175	39	BPI: Silver
1981	Go Ahead	35	—	—	
"—" denotes releases that did not chart.

=== Singles ===
Year	Single	Peak chart positions				Certifications
Year	Single	UK	AUS	US R&B	US Dance	Certifications
1980	"Rise and Shine"	—	—	—	—	
1980	"You're Lying"	15	—	27	71	
1981	"Intuition"	7	69	—	—	BPI: Silver
1981	"Together We Can Shine"	—	—	45	—	
1981	"Throw Away the Key"	21	—	—	—	
1981	"So This Is Romance"	15	—	—	—	
1981	"Can't Help Myself"	55	—	—	—	
1982	"Plaything"	48	—	—	—	
1982	"Don't Hit Me with Love"	—	—	—	—	
"—" denotes releases that did not chart or were not released in that territory.

=== Compilation albums ===
Year	Title
1993	David Grant & Linx - The Best of David Grant & Linx
1996	The Best of Linx
