= Light of the World (band) =

British jazz-funk band

- Origin: London, England
- Genres: Jazz-funk, Brit funk
- Years active: 1978–present
- Labels: Ensign, EMI
- Spinoffs: Beggar and Co

Light of the World are a British jazz-funk band.

== Biography ==
The band was formed in London in 1978. They were originally a forerunner of the late 1970s/early 1980s British jazz-funk movement. The band's name is taken from the 1974 Kool and the Gang album, Light of Worlds. The original line-up consisted of Jean-Paul Maunick, drummer Everton McCalla, bassist Paul Williams, guitarist Neville McKreith, percussionist Chris Etienne, keyboardist Peter Hinds, trumpet player Kenny Wellington and saxophonist David Baptiste. Gee Bello and Nat Augustin joined the band in 1979. The band's debut single, "Swingin'", peaked at No. 45 in the UK Singles Chart. This was later followed up by two top 40 hits: a cover of the Bob Marley and the Wailers song "I Shot the Sheriff" (#40), and the double A-side single "I'm So Happy" / "Time" (#35). Their debut album was released in 1979 on Ensign Records. Their second album Round Trip was released in late 1980 and peaked at No. 73 in the UK Albums Chart.

In 1981 Baptiste, Wellington, and McKreith left the group to form Beggar and Co. In 1982, Gee Bello, Nat Augustin and Paul Williams went on to release a third album titled Check Us Out. A greatest hits album was issued by Ensign Records in 1985. In 1999, Light of the World briefly reunited and recorded an album titled Inner Voices with Nat Augustin on lead vocals, Richard Bull as producer and Kenny Wellington as co-producer.

== Discography ==
=== Studio albums ===
Year	Album	Label	UK
1979	Light of the World	Ensign	—
1980	Round Trip	Ensign	73
1981	Remixed	Mercury	—
1982	Check Us Out	EMI	—
1999	Inner Voices	Sanctuary	—
"—" denotes releases that did not chart.

=== Compilation album ===
- The Best of Light of the World (Ensign, 1985)

=== Singles ===
Year	Song	UK
1979	"Swingin'"	45
1979	"Midnight Groovin'"	72
1980	"The Boys in Blue"	—
1980	"London Town"	41
1980	"I Shot the Sheriff"	40
1980	"I'm So Happy" / "Time"	35
1981	"Ride the Love Train"	49
1982	"Famous Faces"	—
1982	"Check Us Out"	—
1982	"I Can't Stop"	—
1982	"No. 1 Girl"	—
1983	"Jealous Lover"	80
1990	"One Destination"	—
"—" denotes releases that did not chart.
