= John Rocca =

British singer (born 1960)

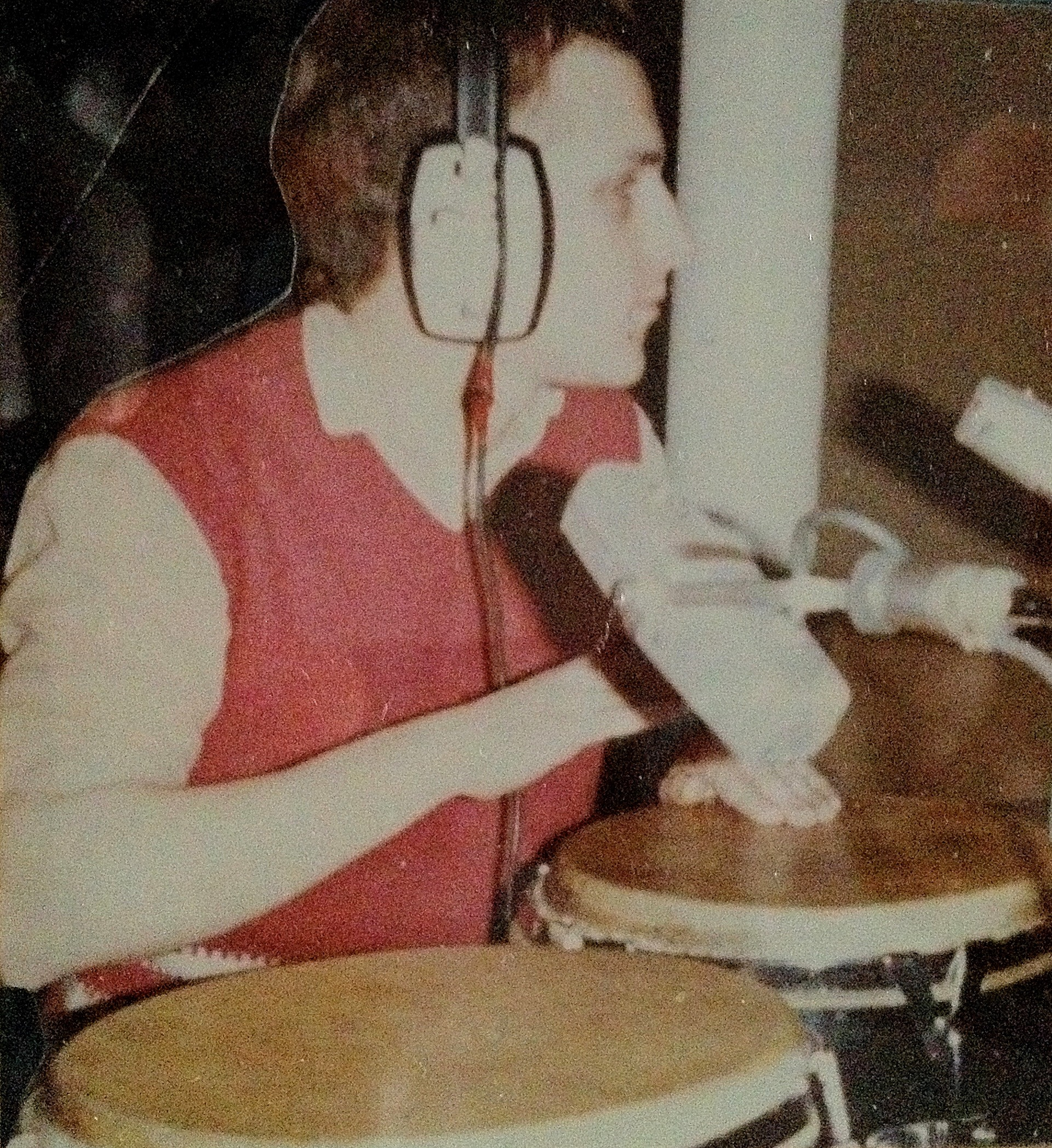

Background information
- Born: 23 September 1960 (age 66); London, England
- Genres: House, post-disco, freestyle, electro
- Occupations: Singer, songwriter, record producer, remixer, recording engineer
- Instruments: Vocals, percussion, synthesizer, computer programming
- Labels: Beggars Banquet, Cobra, Vinyl Solution/Columbia/SME

John Rocca (born 23 September 1960) is an English dance music performer, remixer, percussionist, and record producer, best known for his band Freeez.

== History ==
During the early 1980s, Rocca formed, played with, wrote for, produced and managed his first band, Freeez. After his entrepreneurial first self-funded and self-released effort, "Keep in Touch", became a No. 49 hit on the UK Singles Chart, his next effort, Southern Freeez, was a chart success in various countries in Europe and around the world, reaching No. 8 on the UK Singles Chart. Both singles were number one hits in the UK Blues and Soul charts.

In 1983, one of the first records to use digital sampling, "IOU", featured Rocca's falsetto voice and became one of the major dance successes of the 1980s electro music style. It scored number one in dance charts in Europe and the US Billboard Hot Dance Music/Club Play and had popular music chart success across the world, spending three weeks at number 2 in the UK.

As a solo artist, Rocca scored number one again, this time with "I Want It to Be Real", on the US Hot Dance Music/Club Play chart during 1984. Further hit records followed in 1985, such as "Once Upon a Time" and "Move" both being hits in the Billboard US Hot Dance Music/Club Play chart. As a producer, engineer and remixer, John Rocca worked with bands as diverse as Bomb the Bass and General Public, also touring Europe and Japan respectively with the bands

In the late 1980s, after releasing a number of tracks under the Pseudonym Pink Rhythm such as "Melodies of Love", John began more experimental output. First as on his own Cobra, Chemical and Who'd She Coo Record labels, and then in the early 1990s Rocca resurfaced with his Midi Rain project. Several Midi Rain singles were popular in the UK dance charts, including "Eyes", "Always", and "Shine" - the latter reaching No. 1 on the Billboard US Hot Dance Music/Club Play chart in 1993.

Rocca retired from the music business in late 1993 and after completing a 1st class honours degree at Middlesex University in 1995 he moved directly into IT and Telecommunications. In 1997 Rocca became one of the founding members of the technology start up Intec Telecom Systems. Intec Telecom Systems was successfully launched on the London Stock Exchange in 2001 (symbol: ITL.L).

== Discography ==
=== Solo albums ===
- Unreleased album (Beggars Banquet, 1984)
- Extra Extra (Avenue Records, 1987)
- I.O.U. - The Best of John Rocca (Criminal Records, 1996)

=== Solo singles ===
Year	Song title / Label	Peak chart positions		
Year	Song title / Label	UK	US Dance	US R&B
1984	"I Want It to Be Real" (Beggars Banquet/City Beat/Streetwise)	94	1	55
1984	"Once Upon a Time" (Beggars Banquet/City Beat/Streetwise)	—	72	—
1985	"I Want You" (Beggars Banquet/City Beat/Streetwise)	—	—	—
1985	"Can't Get Enough of Your Love" (credited as Pink Rhythm) (Metropolis)	—	36	—
1985	"India" (credited as Pink Rhythm) (Beggars Banquet)	—	—	—
1985	"Melodies of Love" (credited as Pink Rhythm) (Beggars Banquet)	—	—	—
1987	"I Want It to Be Real" (The Ultimate Mixes '87) (City Beat)	—	—	—
1987	"Move" (Beggars Banquet/City Beat/Streetwise)	—	11	—
1987	"Extra Extra" (City Beat)	—	—	—
1989	"X. Y. Zee" (Cobra Records)	—	—	—
1989	"The River Must Flow" (Cobra Records)	—	—	—
1993	"Shine" Midi Rain (Vinyl Solution/Columbia/SME)	—	1	—
"—" denotes releases that did not chart or were not released in that territory.

== See also ==
- Freeez
- I.O.U.
- Southern Freeez
