= Freeez =

English electronic music group

- Origin: London, England
- Genres: Jazz-funk, electro, freestyle, post-disco
- Years active: 1978–1985
- Labels: Beggars Banquet, Streetwise, City Beat, Virgin
- Past members: John Rocca; Peter Maas; Andy Stennett; Gordon Sullivan; Paul Morgan; Jean-Paul 'Bluey' Maunick

Freeez were an English electronic music group, initially known as one of the UK's main jazz-funk bands of the early 1980s before transitioning to an electro style. Initiated by John Rocca, Freeez consisted of various musicians, originally with Rocca and others such as Andy Stennett (keyboards), Peter Maas (bass guitar) and Paul Morgan or Everton McCalla (drums). They had an international hit with "IOU", and a UK top 10 with "Southern Freeez".

== Career ==
The jazz-funk band Freeez started in North London in 1978. Their first single, "Keep in Touch" (1979) was self-funded and produced by John Rocca on his label Pink Rhythm Records (later signed to Calibre/Pye), and included guitarist Jean-Paul 'Bluey' Maunick, who went on to become the initiator of the band Incognito. Freeez are known for their UK top 10 single "Southern Freeez", from the album of the same name, also produced by Rocca on his Pink Rhythm label; the band was later signed to post-punk label Beggars Banquet. "Southern Freeez" included guest vocals by Ingrid Mansfield Allman. In the UK, the band then moved to recording company Beggars Banquet Records on a more permanent basis.

Freeez's last and biggest hit (top 5 in many countries worldwide) was the song "IOU", which was written and produced by Arthur Baker with lyric contributions and lead vocals by Rocca and remixed by Jellybean Benitez and Baker. The song was also used for the 1980s breakdancing film Beat Street. It spent two weeks at number one on the Billboard Dance chart, and was number 2 on the UK Singles Chart during the summer of 1983. It was followed by other releases from the album such as "Pop Goes My Love" / "Scratch Goes My Dub", which was a U.S. top 5 hit. During 1987, a remix of "I.O.U." reached number 18 on the U.S. Dance chart and number 23 on the UK Singles Chart.

Freeez reformed during 1984 without Rocca and only Peter Maas from the original members. With a new style and virtually a new group, Maas worked with Louis Smith who assumed the duties of keyboard player, co-writer and programmer, with Billy Crichton as songwriter and guitarist. The new Freeez recorded the album, Idle Vice (1985), at Studio number 2 at Abbey Road Studios in the same room where the Beatles made their recordings. "That Beats My Patience" was the first single from the album.

Rocca and Stennett also recorded under other names such as Pictures and Pink Rhythm during 1985 and John Rocca went on to score two further solo number one Billboard Dance hits under his own name and the pseudonym of Midi Rain, along with several other US cult dance hits.

Louis Smith later became a session keyboard player and toured with rock band the Escape Club who had a U.S. number one song with "Wild, Wild West" and several other U.S. top 10 successes. He also recorded as one half of Bass Kruncher with main guitarist John Holliday from the Escape Club.

Later in 1993–94, Maas and Paul Morgan took the Freeez format again and reformed as the Dazzling Urbanites adding Poly Koutrouzas (vocals) and Max Rutherford (guitar) to the line up. Despite extensive preparation and rehearsals in North London (Dukes Avenue, Muswell Hill), the original success was never achieved.

Late 2011 saw the first CD release of their 1980 debut album Southern Freeez. The CD came as a double 'expanded' two-disc set featuring 12-inch versions, remixes and rare demos as well as a newly written inlay booklet featuring notes from Rocca and Maas. Their second album Gonna Get You has also been reissued in the same format.

== Discography ==
=== Albums ===
Year	Album title / Label	Chart positions
Year	Album title / Label	UK
1981	Southern Freeez (Beggars Banquet)	17
1983	Gonna Get You (Beggars Banquet)	46
1983	I.O.U. (Streetwise, Beggars Banquet)	—
1984	Anti-Freeez (Beggars Banquet)	—
1985	Idle Vice (Beggars Banquet)	—
"—" denotes releases that did not chart.

=== Singles ===
Year	Song title / Label	Peak chart positions						Certifications
Year	Song title / Label	AUS	US Dance	UK	US R&B	NLD	BEL	Certifications
1980	"Keep in Touch" (Pye)	—	—	49	—	—	—	
1980	"Stay" / "Hot Footin' It" (Pink Rhythm)	—	—	—	—	—	—	
1981	"Southern Freeez" (Beggars Banquet)	—	—	8	—	—	—	BPI: Silver
1981	"Flying High" (Beggars Banquet)	—	—	35	—	—	—	
1981	"Anti-Freeez (Set Me Free)" / "Mountain Man" (Beggars Banquet)	—	—	—	—	—	—	
1982	"One to One" (Beggars Banquet)	—	—	—	—	—	—	
1983	"I.O.U." (Beggars Banquet)	3	1	2	13	2	3	BPI: Gold
1983	"Pop Goes My Love" / "Scratch Goes My Dub" (Beggars Banquet)	—	5	26	47	24	10	
1983	"Love's Gonna Get You" (Beggars Banquet)	—	—	—	—	—	—	
1984	"That Beats My Patience" (Beggars Banquet)	—	—	—	—	—	—	
1984	"Train of Thoughts" (Beggars Banquet)	—	—	—	—	—	—	
1987	"I.O.U." (remix) (Citybeat)	—	37	23	—	—	—	
1987	"Southern Freeez" (remix) (Total Control)	—	—	63	—	—	—	
"—" denotes releases that did not chart or were not released in that territory.

== See also ==
- List of number-one dance hits (United States)
- List of artists who reached number one on the US Dance chart
