= Round and Around (Jaki Graham song) =

1984 song by Jaki Graham

Single by Jaki Graham

from the album Heaven Knows
- B-side: "Victim of Emotion"
- Released: June 1985
- Recorded: 1984
- Genre: R&B; soul
- Length: 4:06
- Label: EMI
- Songwriter: Derek Bramble
- Producer: Derek Bramble

Jaki Graham singles chronology
"Could It Be I'm Falling in Love" (1985)	"Round and Around" (1985)	"Ain't Nobody" (1994)

"Round and Around" is the fourth solo single release from British singer Jaki Graham, following her previous single, a duet with David Grant, "Could It Be I'm Falling in Love". It was the third single taken from her debut studio album, Heaven Knows.

"Round and Around" was released in June 1985 and peaked inside the UK Singles Chart at number 9, spending a total of 11 weeks inside the UK top 75. The song was also released in the US, peaking at number 85 on the Billboard Hot R&B/Hip-Hop Songs chart in November 1985.

== Formats and track listings ==
7" vinyl

1. "Round and Around" – 4:06
2. "Victim of Emotion" – 3:37

12" vinyl

A

1. "Round and Around" (Extended Version) – 5:53

B

1. "Round and Around" – 4:06
2. "Victim of Emotion" – 3:02

== Charts ==
Chart (1985)	Peak position
German Singles Chart	23
UK Singles Chart	9
US Billboard Hot R&B/Hip-Hop Songs	85

== Beverley Knight version ==
"Round and Around"

Single by Beverley Knight

from the album Soul UK
- Released: 12 February 2012
- Recorded: 2010
- Genre: R&B; Soul
- Length: 4:54 (Album Version); 3:48 (5am Radio Edit)
- Label: Hurricane
- Songwriter: Derek Bramble
- Producer: Martin Terefe

Beverley Knight singles chronology
"One More Try" (2011)	"Round and Around" (2012)	"I Found Out" (2014)

British singer-songwriter Beverley Knight covered "Round and Around" and released it as the fourth single release from her seventh studio album, Soul UK, a tribute to UK soul artists. It was released in the UK on 12 February 2012.

The single version of "Round and Around" was remixed and produced by 5 am. The B-side is a remix of Knight's cover of Freeez's "Southern Freeez", the original of which also appears on Soul UK. DJ Munro (who collaborated with Knight on previous songs such as "Salvador" from Affirmation and "Breakout" and "In Your Shoes" from 100%) contributed remixes of both "Round and Around" and the aforementioned "Southern Freeez" remix for the single release.

=== Background ===
Knight said of "Round and Around": "Jaki Graham is from my hometown. I once got her autograph in Wolverhampton's department store! Whenever I saw or heard her, I felt so proud. I followed every move she made in her career and thought to myself if she can make it happen, so can I. This song was so ripe for a new version to give it a classic sound." She also spoke of the B-side, "Southern Freeez", by saying: "I have loved this since hearing it as a child. I always thought it sounded so sophisticated, with its uplifting chords. It's a summer drive with the top down, fabulous song."

=== Promotion ===
Knight promoted the release of "Round and Around" and her Love Soul: Soul UK Live EP on Lorraine on 9 February and Loose Women on 14 February 2012.

=== Track listing ===
Digital download

1. "Round and Around" (5am Radio Edit) – 3:48
2. "Round and Around" (5am Full Version) – 4:56
3. "Round and Around" (5am Extended Mix) – 6:58
4. "Round and Around" (DJ Munro Mix) – 4:58
5. "Southern Freeez" (DJ Munro Extended Mix) – 5:03

Album version

1. "Round and Around" – 4:54

Live version (taken from the Love Soul: Soul UK Live EP)

1. "Round and Around" (Live from Porchester Hall) – 5:48

=== Release history ===
Region	Date	Format
United Kingdom	12 February 2012	Digital download
