= Love Soul: Soul UK Live EP =

EP by Beverley Knight
- Released: 12 February 2012
- Genres: R&B, soul, neo soul
- Length: 19:25
- Label: Hurricane Records

Singles from Love Soul: Soul UK Live EP
- 1. "Round and Around" Released: 12 February 2012

Love Soul: Soul UK Live EP is the first EP released by British soul singer Beverley Knight. It is composed of three covers of songs originally by Heatwave, Jaki Graham and Princess, with the deluxe iTunes version containing a fourth track, originally by Lewis Taylor.

The EP was announced for release via Knight's official web site on 20 January 2012. It was released on 12 February 2012, the same day as "Round and Around", the fourth single from her album Soul UK is released. A live version of the single is featured as track 2 of the EP.

== Background and production ==
The Love Soul: Soul UK Live EP was recorded at Knight's Soul UK album launch event on 7 April 2011, which was held at the Porchester Hall in London. Live video performances of the tracks, "Always and Forever" and "Round and Around" were featured on the DVD accompanying the album. It is the first time that the live audio version of "Round and Around" has been featured on a Beverley Knight release, whereas "Say I'm Your Number One" was left off the DVD release of the album. The iTunes version of the EP features an extra track, a live version of Lewis Taylor's "Damn".

== Promotion ==
Knight performed the "Always and Forever" on Lorraine on 9 February 2012 to promote the EP. She was also interviewed about the EP on Loose Women on 14 February 2012.

== Music video ==
A week after the release of the EP on 20 February 2012, a video for the opening track, "Always and Forever" was released. The video was directed by Dean Sherwood and was filmed during 2011's Soul UK Tour.

== Track listing ==
Digital download

No.	Title	Writer(s)	Length
1.	"Always and Forever" (Live at The Porchester Hall)	Rod Temperton	7:57
2.	"Round and Around" (Live at The Porchester Hall)	Derek Bramble	5:41
3.	"Say I'm Your Number One" (Live at The Porchester Hall)	Pete Waterman, Mike Stock, Matt Aitken	5:49
Total length:			19:25

iTunes bonus track
No.	Title	Writer(s)	Length
4.	"Damn" (Live at The Porchester Hall)	Lewis Taylor	6:36

== Release history ==
Region	Date	Format
United Kingdom	12 February 2012	Digital download
