= Soul UK =

2011 studio album by Beverley Knight

Studio album by Beverley Knight
- Released: 4 July 2011
- Recorded: 2010–2011
- Genre: R&B; soul; neo soul
- Length: 63:32
- Label: Hurricane Records
- Producer: Future Cut, Martin Terefe

Beverley Knight chronology
100% (2009)	Soul UK (2011)	The Collection 1995–2007 (2012)

Singles from Soul UK
- 1. "Mama Used to Say" Released: 27 June 2011; 2. "Cuddly Toy" Released: 28 August 2011; 3. "One More Try" Released: 23 October 2011; 4. "Round and Around" Released: 12 February 2012

Soul UK is the seventh studio album by the English singer-songwriter Beverley Knight. The album was released on 4 July 2011, and features covers of British soul songs that inspired her whilst growing up. The album includes a live DVD of the tracks, filmed on 7 April at the Porchester Hall in London.

== Background ==
In the press release for Soul UK, Knight explained her choice to make and release an album of cover versions. She stated "I gave a lot of thought to choosing the songs I wanted to interpret for this album and it was great fun putting my own flavour and twist on tracks by some of the fantastic UK artists who preceded me and inspired me. A lot these artists opened doors for both myself and many others, and many of them are still going strong – so the album is, in part, a thank you to them. The UK is a world-beating producer of musical talent and this genre can sometimes feel overlooked and underplayed. I hope with this album that people can enjoy these songs all over again and in some cases discover them for the first time."

On her official site, Knight gave a track-by-track rundown of the album, explaining the inspiration behind recording each track that features. She introduced it by explaining, "Welcome to Soul UK, my celebration of some of the home grown artists and soulful tracks that have inspired me. Some of these artists have had enormously successful careers, others have had glimpses of success, and others have never really been given due attention and respect. All these songs, artists and writers have in various ways contributed to my own career in music, and deserve to be recognised for cutting a path that enabled me and every other British Soul/Urban act without exception to walk more easily. This is why I have made this album, it is a labour of love, and my tribute to heroes both celebrated and unsung."

The album features production from producer Martin Terefe, who has worked with James Morrison and Jason Mraz, along with London production duo, Future Cut who have worked with both Lily Allen and Beyoncé.

== Critical reception ==
Professional ratings
Review scores
Source	Rating
Blues & Soul	(8/10)
The Daily Telegraph	3/5 stars
Daily Mirror	4/5 stars
Daily Express	(4/5)

Emery Bairns of Blues & Soul gave the album an 8 out of 10 rating.

== Track listing ==
The full track listing was confirmed by iTunes.

No.	Title	Writer(s)	Producer(s)	Length
1.	"Fairplay"	Rose Windross, Beresford Romeo, Nellee Hooper	Martin Terefe	4:25
2.	"Southern Freeez"	Peter Maas, John Rocca, Andy Stennett	Martin Terefe	4:38
3.	"Mama Used to Say"	Bob Carter, Junior Giscombe	Martin Terefe	3:50
4.	"Say I'm Your Number One"	Stock Aitken Waterman	Future Cut	4:25
5.	"When You Gonna Learn"	Jay Kay	Martin Terefe	4:55
6.	"Apparently Nothin'" (featuring Glen Scott & Roots Manuva)	Carleen Anderson, Marco Nelson	Martin Terefe	5:55
7.	"There's Nothing Like This" (featuring Michael Jai)	Hammer	Future Cut	4:52
8.	"Don't Be a Fool"	Phillip Linton, Carl McIntosh, Kenny Nicholas, Trevor Jacobs, Sunay Suleyman	Future Cut	4:10
9.	"Always and Forever"	Rod Temperton	Martin Terefe	5:38
10.	"Round and Around"	Derek Bramble	Martin Terefe	4:54
11.	"Cuddly Toy"	Andrew Roachford	Martin Terefe	3:56
12.	"Damn"	Lewis Taylor	Martin Terefe	6:12
13.	"One More Try"	George Michael	Martin Terefe	5:41
Total length:				63:32

iTunes bonus tracks
No.	Title	Length
14.	"Southern Freeez" (Live)	5:18
15.	"Say I'm Your Number One" (Live)	4:31
16.	"Always and Forever" (Live)	5:51
17.	"Fairplay" (Live)	4:47
18.	"Damn" (Live)	6:36
Total length:		89:34

Bonus DVD
No.	Title	Length
1.	"Live Concert Film of Soul UK: Introduction" (featuring Roachford, Jazzie B, Jaki Graham, Junior & Rod Temperton)
2.	"Southern Freeez"
3.	"Fairplay"
4.	"When You Gonna Learn"
5.	"Apparently Nothin'"
6.	"One More Try"
7.	"Round and Around"
8.	"There's Nothing Like This"
9.	"Always and Forever"
10.	"Mama Used to Say"
11.	"Cuddly Toy"
12.	"Interviews with Beverley and the original artists"

== Singles ==
Knight confirmed whilst performing at London's Porchester Hall, at the album launch show, in April 2011, that the first single from the album would be "Mama Used to Say", a cover of the Junior single, which peaked number 7 in the UK in 1982. The single was released on 27 June 2011. The second single was Knight's version of Roachford's "Cuddly Toy", released on 28 August 2011, while the third was Knight's version of George Michael's "One More Try", released on 23 October 2011. "Round and Around", originally recorded by Jaki Graham was released as the fourth single from Soul UK on 12 February 2012.

== Original artists ==
- "Fairplay" by Soul II Soul (1988) (UK #63)
- "Southern Freeez" by Freeez (1981) (UK #8)
- "Mama Used to Say" by Junior (1982) (UK #7)
- "Say I'm Your Number One" by Princess (1985) (UK #7)
- "When You Gonna Learn" by Jamiroquai (1992) (UK #28)
- "Apparently Nothin'" by Young Disciples (1991) (UK #13)
- "There's Nothing Like This" by Omar (1991) (UK #14)
- "Don't Be a Fool" by Loose Ends (1990) (UK #13)
- "Always and Forever" by Heatwave (1977) (UK #9)
- "Round and Around" by Jaki Graham (1985) (UK #9)
- "Cuddly Toy" by Roachford (1988) (UK #4)
- "Damn" by Lewis Taylor (1996)
- "One More Try" by George Michael (1988) (UK #8)

Information lifted from the liner notes on Soul UK.

== Chart performance ==
Chart (2011)	Peak position
Scottish Singles Chart	27
UK Albums Chart	13

== Soul UK – The Remixes ==
A remix album, entitled Soul UK – The Remixes was released exclusively on digital download via Beatport on 29 January 2012. It features remixes of Soul UK album tracks "Mama Used to Say", "Apparently Nothin'", "Cuddly Toy", "Round and Around" and "Southern Freeez".

Soul UK – The Remixes

Remix album by Beverley Knight
- Released: 29 January 2012
- Recorded: 2010–2012
- Genre: R&B; Soul
- Label: Hurricane Records
- Producer: Dave Doyle, Cool Millions, Neil Thompson, ESquire, Cutmore, 5am, DJ Munro, Soul Seekerz, MCM

Beverley Knight chronology
100% – The Remixes (2012)	Soul UK – The Remixes (2012)

=== Track listing ===
Digital download

No.	Title	Writer(s)	Length
1.	"Mama Used to Say" (Dave Doyle Extended Club Mix)	Bob Carter, Junior Giscombe	7:42
2.	"Mama Used to Say" (Cool Million's Boogie Down 12" Mix)	Bob Carter, Junior Giscombe	5:36
3.	"Mama Used to Say" (Cool Million's Boogie Down Mix)	Bob Carter, Junior Giscombe	4:09
4.	"Apparently Nothin'" (Neil Thompson's Regrooved Mix)	Anderson, Nelson	7:15
5.	"Cuddly Toy" (ESquire Club Mix)	Roachford	6:09
6.	"Cuddly Toy" (Cutmore Club Mix)	Roachford	6:33
7.	"Cuddly Toy" (David Doyle Club Mix)	Roachford	7:15
8.	"Cuddly Toy" (David Doyle Radio Mix)	Roachford	3:04
9.	"Round and Around" (5am Radio Mix)	Bramble	3:48
10.	"Round and Around" (5am Full Version)	Bramble	4:56
11.	"Round and Around" (5am Extended Mix)	Bramble	6:58
12.	"Round and Around" (DJ Munro Mix)	Bramble	4:58
13.	"Southern Freeez" (DJ Munro Extended Mix)	Peter Maas, John Rocca, Andy Stennett	5:03
14.	"Southern Freeez" (Soul Seekerz Club Mix)	Peter Maas, John Rocca, Andy Stennett	7:17
15.	"Southern Freeez" (Soul Seekerz Radio Mix)	Peter Maas, John Rocca, Andy Stennett	3:28
16.	"Southern Freeez" (Soul Seekerz Dub Mix)	Peter Maas, John Rocca, Andy Stennett	7:17
17.	"Southern Freeez" (MCM Funky Freeez Radio Edit)	Peter Maas, John Rocca, Andy Stennett	3:18
