= Too Late =

Too Late may refer to:

== Film and theatre ==
- Too Late (1914 film), American film written by Winifred Dunn
- Too Late (1996 film), a Romanian film
- Too Late (2000 film), a Portuguese film
- Too Late (2015 film), an American film
- Too Late, a 1974 play by Gibson Kente

== Songs ==
- "Too Late" (Dead by Sunrise song), 2009
- "Too Late (True Love)", by the Real Milli Vanilli, 1991
- "Too Late", by Jimmy Wakely from Ira and Charlie, 1958
- "Too Late", by Labi Siffre from his self-titled debut album, 1970
- "Too Late", by Wire from Chairs Missing, 1978
- "Too Late", by Journey from Evolution, 1979
- "Too Late (Junior)", by Junior from Ji, 1981
- "Too Late", by Orchestral Manoeuvres in the Dark from Universal, 1996
- "Too Late", by Ayumi Hamasaki from A, 1999
- "Too Late", by Jennifer Lopez from On the 6, 1999
- "Too Late", by No Doubt from Return of Saturn, 2000
- "Too Late", by M83 from Saturdays = Youth, 2008
- "Too Late", by Foreigner from Can't Slow Down, 2009
- "Too Late", by the Paper Kites from Twelvefour, 2015
- "Too Late", by The Weeknd from After Hours, 2020
- "Too Late", by SZA from SOS, 2022
- "Too Late" by Quinn XCII and AJR from The People's Champ, 2023

== See also ==
- "Too Late Too Late", a song by Mr Hudson & The Library
- It's Too Late (disambiguation)
