= Mama Used to Say =

1981 pop song by Junior

Single by Junior

from the album Ji
- Released: 27 July 1981
- Recorded: February 1981
- Genre: Soul; electro; brit funk; pop
- Length: 6:40 (Album Version); 3:35 (American Remix)
- Label: Mercury
- Songwriters: Junior Giscombe, Bob Carter
- Producer: Bob Carter

Junior singles chronology
"Get Up And Dance/Hot Up And Heated" (1980)	"Mama Used to Say" (1981)	"Too Late (Junior)" (1982)

Music video
- "Mama Used to Say" on YouTube

"Mama Used to Say" is the debut single release by the British R&B recording artist Junior, taken from his debut studio album Ji (1982). The song was recorded in February 1981 and released in July 1981.

== Formats and track listings ==
12" vinyl

1. "Mama Used to Say" – 6:40
2. "Mama Used to Say" (Instrumental) – 6:05
3. "Mama Used to Say" (English Party Mix) – 4:56

7" vinyl

1. "Mama Used to Say" (American Remix) – 3:35
2. "Mama Used to Say" (American Instrumental Mix) – 4:35

== Charts ==
"Mama Used to Say" was released in 1981 and reached the UK Singles Chart Top 10 in June 1982, where it remained at No. 7 for two weeks. It was also a Top 40 hit and in the United States, earning Junior a Best Newcomer award from Billboard magazine. The song was ranked at No. 6 among the Top 10 tracks of the year for 1981 by NME.

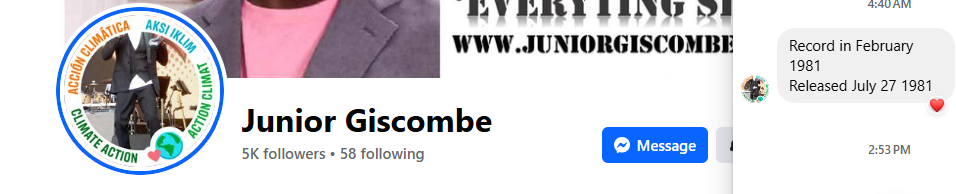
Junior Giscombe talking about when mama used to say was released and recorded

=== Weekly charts ===
Chart (1982)	Peak position
Belgium (Ultratop 50 Flanders)	29
Canada	48
France (SNEP)	56
Ireland (IRMA)	15
South Africa (Springbok Radio)	11
New Zealand (Recorded Music NZ)	49
UK Singles (Official Charts)	7
US Billboard Hot 100	30
U.S. Billboard Disco Top 80	4
U.S. Billboard Hot Soul Singles	2

== Beverley Knight version ==
"Mama Used to Say"

Single by Beverley Knight

from the album Soul UK
- Released: 27 June 2011
- Recorded: 2010
- Genre: R&B; Soul
- Length: 3:51 (Album Version); 3:01 (Radio Version)
- Label: Hurricane
- Songwriters: Junior Giscombe, Bob Carter
- Producer: Martin Terefe

Beverley Knight singles chronology
"Soul Survivor" (2010)	"Mama Used to Say" (2011)	"Cuddly Toy" (2011)

Music video
- "Mama Used to Say" on YouTube

British singer-songwriter Beverley Knight released "Mama Used to Say" on 27 June 2011 as the first single release from her seventh studio album, Soul UK, a tribute to UK soul artists.

=== Background ===
Knight said of the song, "I think this was everyone's favourite track at the time and is still played on every 'club classics' radio show in the country. It's still so fresh and just brings a smile whenever I sing it. It was an obvious choice for the album and a no-brainer for the choice of first single."

=== Track listing ===
Digital download

1. "Mama Used to Say" (Radio Version) – 3:01
2. "Mama Used to Say" (Album Version) – 3:51
3. "Mama Used to Say" (Dave Doyle Extended Club Mix) – 7:42
4. "Mama Used to Say" (Cool Million's Boogie Down 12 Mix) – 5:36
5. "Mama Used to Say" (Cool Million's Boogie Down Mix) – 4:09
6. "Mama Used to Say" (Live) – 4:36

=== Music video ===
The music video for "Mama Used to Say" premiered on Knight's YouTube page on 23 May 2011. The video features both performance and behind-the-scenes footage from her April 2011 album launch show at London's Porchester Hall, soundtracked to the album version of the song. The video features cameos by Junior, Jaki Graham, Rod Temperton and Jazzie B.

=== Release history ===
Region	Date	Format
United Kingdom	27 June 2011	Digital download

== Samples and other uses ==
- British comedian and rapper Richard Blackwood (Junior's nephew) sampled "Mama Used to Say" on his debut single "Mama – Who Da Man", which peaked at No. 3 on the UK Singles Chart in 2000.
- The song's guitar intro was sampled for Positive K's hit "I Got a Man".
- Rapper Mac sampled the song on "Slow Ya Roll" from his album Shell Shocked.
- Rapper Heavy D of Heavy D & the Boyz sampled "Mama Used to Say" for the song "Is It Good to You" from the album Peaceful Journey.
- Rapper Warren G sampled the song for his "Do You See" single from his "Regulate... G Funk Era" album released in late 1994.
- The rap group Bone Thugs-n-Harmony sampled the song for their single "Thuggish Ruggish Bone" from their 1994 debut EP Creepin on ah Come Up.
- The song is featured in the video game NBA 2K15, chosen by Pharrell Williams. It is also featured in NBA 2K26 as part of the "2K Greatest Hits Soundtrack".
- The song was used as the "Lip Sync for Your Legacy" in episode 9 of RuPaul's Drag Race All Stars season 10, between Ginger Minj and Daya Betty.
