= There's Nothing Like This (song) =

1990 song from Omar

Single by Omar

from the album There's Nothing Like This
- Released: 1990 (original release); 1991 (re-release)
- Genre: Soul; neo soul; jazz; ragga
- Length: 4:01
- Label: Talkin' Loud
- Songwriter: Omar
- Producers: Omar and the Family

Omar singles chronology
"There's Nothing Like This" (1990)	"Your Loss My Gain" (1992)

Music video
- "There's Nothing Like This" on YouTube

"There's Nothing Like This" is a song by British soul singer and songwriter Omar (a.k.a. Omar Lye-Fook), initially released by in 1990 as his debut single. The song is taken from the singer's debut album of the same name (1990), and was re-released in 1991 by Talkin' Loud, peaking at number 14 in the UK. Additionally, it peaked at number 13 in Luxembourg, number 27 in Germany, number 34 in Sweden and number 35 in France. The song remains his biggest and most well-known hit to date. The accompanying music video has a sepia tone. In 2013, a new version of "There's Nothing Like This" was released, featuring Welsh musician Pino Palladino.

== Background and release ==
Classically trained multi-instrumentalist Omar first released "There's Nothing Like This" on his dad's independent Kongo Dance label in 1990. The song, written by him, was entirely self-recorded on an eight-track and managed to shift 35,000 copies. By the end of 1990, British club, radio and sound system DJ Norman Jay of Talkin' Loud signed him and plans to repeat the London phenomenon on a national scale were laid. In 1991, the single was re-released and an album by the same name was also released.

Omar told Louise Golbey in 2020 that the song was inspired by "Heaven Must Be Like This", a song off Ohio Players' 1974 album Skin Tight, and its lyrics were written under the influence of marijuana.

== Critical reception ==
Upon the 1990 release, Paul Lester from Melody Maker complimented "There's Nothing Like This" as "a tasty slice of mellifluous ragga-soul shuffling and Stevie Wonder-ful crooning. So laidback it's upside down, or something." David Giles from Music Week wrote, "Only the mighty Blue Nile prevented this marvellous soul-track from reaching the top left-hand corner of the page. Omar is a Kent-born multi-instrumentalist with a wonderfully expressive voice who has created a heavily jazz-influenced sound – complete with George Benson-style guitar – that has seen him top the UK soul charts". After the 1991 release, another editor, Alan Jones, named it Pick of the Week, commenting, "Expensively acquired from the indie Kongo Dance label, Omar's slow, sinewy sleeper from last year is a surefire smash. The young Londoner has been attracting massive audiences at live shows. If he can go on delivering material like this intimately and excellently vocalised swayer he will soon repay Talkin' Loud's investment. Top 10 material."

Dorian Silver from NME said, "Believe the hype, there's nothing like this." A reviewer from Newcastle Evening Chronicle wrote, "His cool jazzy title track is one of the best recent chart singles and it's certainly no flash in the pan." The newspaper also noted its "gentle sensual shunter with soul" and "latin and jazz influences." Ralph Tee from the Record Mirror Dance Update felt the song is "one of the finest masterpieces in innovative soul ever to come out of the UK." Lindsay Baker from Spin declared it as "achingly pure, gut-wrenching soul."

== Impact and legacy ==
In 1994, NME featured "There's Nothing Like This" in their "top ten vibin' modern soul-jazz masterstrokes that every 'face' should own", writing, "It floated into the charts like a dream; a gossamer-winged lullaby articulating the fragility and fleeting wonder of love. Much like Omar's career, it lasted only three minutes."

In 2004, Q magazine featured the song in their list of "The 1010 Songs You Must Own".

== Cover versions ==
British reggae singer Maxi Priest covered the song in 2004 from his album 2 the Max.

British R&B singer Beverley Knight released a version of the song on her 2011 covers album Soul UK.

== Track listings ==
- 7" single, UK (1990)
1. "There's Nothing Like This" — 4:35
2. "Don't Mean a Thing" — 3:45
- 12" single, UK (1990)
1. "There's Nothing Like This" — 6:10
2. "There's Nothing Like This" (radio mix) — 4:35
3. "Don't Mean a Thing" — 3:45
- CD single, UK & Europe (1991)
1. "There's Nothing Like This" (7" edit) — 4:01
2. "There's Nothing Like This" (12") — 6:38
3. "There's Nothing Like This" (7" remix edit) — 5:15
4. "I Don't Mind the Waiting" (7" edit) — 3:48

== Charts ==
Chart (1991)	Peak positions
Europe (Eurochart Hot 100)	43
France (SNEP)	35
Germany (Official German Charts)	27
Israel (Israeli Singles Chart)	25
Luxembourg (Radio Luxembourg)	13
Netherlands (Dutch Top 40 Tipparade)	5
Netherlands (Single Top 100)	55
Sweden (Sverigetopplistan)	34
UK Singles (OCC)	14
UK Airplay (Music Week)	12
UK Dance (Music Week)	5
UK Club Chart (Record Mirror)	24
