= Love of Your Life =

(The) Love of Your Life may refer to:

- Love of Your Life (film), a 2026 American romantic drama film
- "The Love of Your Life", a song by Jaki Graham on her 1986 album Breaking Away
- "Love of Your Life", a song on the 2020 album Euphoric Sad Songs by British singer-songwriter Raye

== See also ==
- "Let Me Be the No. 1 (Love of Your Life)]]", a 1975 song by Dooley Silverspoon
- The Loves of Your Life, a 2020 studio album by Hamilton Leithauser
