= Junior Giscombe =

British singer

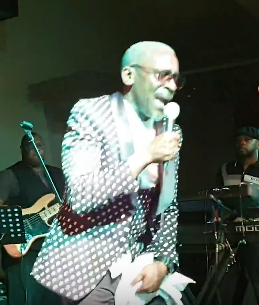
- Junior performing in 2019.

Background information
- Also known as: Junior
- Born: Norman Washington Giscombe; 6 June 1957 (age 69); Wandsworth, London, England
- Origin: London, England
- Genres: R&B; soul; funk; pop; disco; jazz; new jack swing
- Occupation: Singer
- Instrument: Vocals
- Years active: 1971–present
- Label: Mercury
- Website: www.juniorgiscombe.co.uk

Norman Washington "Junior" Giscombe (born 6 June 1957) is an English singer often known as simply Junior who was one of the first British R&B artists to be successful in the United States. He is best known for his 1982 hit single, "Mama Used to Say".

== Career ==
Giscombe was born in Wandsworth, London, England, and was a backing vocalist with Linx between 1980 and 1982.

"In the early to mid 70s, Junior collaborated with classmates to establish a record label in Balham, South London. They released a record titled Nice and Slow, of which Junior later said it had reached number one in Australia".

"In 1978 or 1979, Get Up And Dance/Hot Up And Heated was recorded and later released in 1980. According to Junior, it reached number one in France as well as number one on the Billboard Breakout Chart".

When turning towards a solo career, he was first billed simply as Junior. He scored a No. 7 hit in the UK Singles Chart in 1982, with "Mama Used to Say Junior has claimed that the song was number one on US Cashbox." His follow-up single, "Too Late (Junior)" also made the top 20 in the UK. "Mama Used to Say" was also a top 40 Pop and top 5 R&B hit in the United States, earning him a "Best Newcomer" award from Billboard magazine.

"Junior's single Unison was released in 1983 and achieved some commercial success, particularly on the U.S. Dance Chart. While Junior has claimed that the song reached the number one position, official chart records indicate that it peaked at number 16.

Sometime (most likely) around 1984 and 1985, Giscombe recorded (and very possibly co-wrote) an unknown number of songs with Phil Lynott, the former leader, vocalist and bass player of hard rock band Thin Lizzy. Lynott died in January 1986 and the songs were never officially released. Most remain as demos, but one of the songs, "Lady Loves to Dance", was mastered and nearly released before being pulled by the record company. Some of the songs are available on YouTube, including "What's the Matter Baby" (Giscombe provides backing vocals) and "Time (and Again)" and the unreleased track of Breakdown (Giscombe shares vocals with Lynott).

After a period outside the charts, Giscombe made a brief return to the top 10 in 1987 when he sang duet with Kim Wilde on "Another Step (Closer to You)" which peaked at number 6 in the UK Singles Chart and, according to Giscombe, number 3 in the French Charts, as well as an unspecified chart position in Germany. Junior became involved with the formation of Red Wedge in 1986 with Billy Bragg, Jimmy Somerville and Paul Weller, and had been a part of the Council Collective with The Style Council, Jimmy Ruffin and others for the 1984 fundraising single, "Soul Deep". In 1992, Junior appeared on stage at the 1992 Labour rally in Sheffield singing Curtis Mayfield's "Move On Up". Later, Giscombe became better known as a songwriter for artists such as Sheena Easton.

In 2008 Junior Giscombe sang "A Change Is Gonna Come" which was originally sung by Sam Cooke and Junior gave a performance with the Virtual Jazz Band which was later released presumably using the same vocals in 2011.

On 15 April 2010, Giscombe performed his classic hit "Mama Used to Say" with the Virtual Jazz Band at London's Jazz Cafe.

In 2014, Giscombe formed "The British Collective" with fellow British artists Don-E, Noel McKoy and Omar. In 2017, Giscombe appeared on Mike City's album The Feel Good Agenda, Vol. 1 on the song "Sang and Dance".

"Sweet Tender Love" is a song by Junior Giscombe that peaked at number 15 on the UK Heritage Chart. It was released in 2024.

== Personal life ==
Junior Giscombe was raised as the youngest of eight children.

He met his childhood sweetheart Nardia when he was 19 and she was 17 and remained together until her death. At the age of 24, Nardia was diagnosed with multiple sclerosis and died of complications from the condition in 2008 aged 50. Junior and Nardia had two children. Their second child, Jenique, was also diagnosed with multiple sclerosis in 2008 (six months before her mother's death) and she died in May 2017. Giscombe dedicated his 2020 album "Everything Set" to his daughter's memory.

Giscombe is the uncle of British comedian Richard Blackwood, who sampled "Mama Used to Say" on his single "Mama – Who Da Man" in June 2000.

== Discography ==
=== Albums ===
==== Studio albums ====
Title	Album details	Peak chart positions		
Title	Album details	UK	US	US R&B
Ji	Released: April 1982; Label: Mercury; Formats: LP, MC	28	71	15
Inside Lookin' Out	Released: July 1983; Label: Mercury; Formats: LP, MC	—	177	54
Acquired Taste	Released: 3 March 1986; Label: London, Mercury; Formats: CD, LP, MC	—	—	34
Sophisticated Street	Released: April 1988; Label: London; Formats: CD, LP, MC	—	—	56
Stand Strong	Released: February 1991; Label: MCA; Formats: CD, LP, MC	—	—	—
Renewal	Released: November 1992; Label: MCA; Formats: CD, LP, MC	—	—	—
Honesty	Released: 1995; Label: Provocative; Formats: CD, LP	—	—	—
Oceans	Released: 2006; Label: M2M/High Quest; Formats: CD	—	—	—
Prisoner of Hope	Released: 31 October 2011; Label: Prisoner of Hope; Formats: CD	—	—	—
"—" denotes releases that did not chart or were not released in that territory.

==== Compilation albums ====
Title	Album details
The Best of Junior	Released: 1995; Label: Mercury; Formats: CD
His Very Best	Released: 2000; Label: Time Music; Formats: CD
The Best Of Junior (New Recordings Of His Greatest Hits And More)	Released: 2002; Label: Mercury; Formats: CD

=== Singles ===
Title	Year	Peak chart positions									Album
Title	Year	UK	AUS	BEL (FL)	IRE	NL	NZ	US	US R&B	US Dance	Album
"Get Up and Dance"	1981	—	—	—	—	—	—	—	—	—	Non-album single
"Hot Up And Heated"	1981	—	—	—	—	—	—	—	—	—	Non-album single
"Mama Used to Say"	1981	76	—	—	—	—	—	—	—	—	Ji
"Mama Used to Say" (remix)	1982	7	—	28	15	—	49	30	2	4	Ji
"Too Late"	1982	20	—	—	29	—	—	102	8	67	Ji
"I Can't Help It" / "Let Me Know"	1982	53	—	—	—	—	—	—	—	—	Ji
"Communication Breakdown"	1983	57	—	—	—	—	—	—	40	—	Inside Lookin' Out
"Baby, I Want You Back" (US-only release)	1983	—	—	—	—	—	—	—	72	—	Inside Lookin' Out
"Runnin'"	1983	92	—	—	—	—	—	—	—	—	Inside Lookin' Out
"Unison" (US and Southern Africa-only release)	1983	—	—	—	—	—	—	—	44	16	All the Right Moves (soundtrack)
"Somebody"	1984	64	—	—	—	—	—	—	47	28	Acquired Tastes
"Do You Really (Want My Love)"	1985	47	—	—	—	—	49	—	—	—	Acquired Tastes
"Oh Louise"	1985	74	—	—	—	—	—	—	—	—	Acquired Tastes
"Come On Over"	1986	87	—	—	—	—	—	—	—	—	Acquired Tastes
"Oh Louise" (remix)	1986	83	—	—	—	—	—	—	14	—	Acquired Tastes
"Not Tonight" (US-only release)	1986	—	—	—	—	—	—	—	76	—	Acquired Tastes
"Another Step (Closer to You)" (with Kim Wilde)	1987	6	88	—	6	95	—	—	—	—	Another Step
"Yes (If You Want Me)"	1987	159	—	—	—	—	—	—	24	—	Sophisticated Street
"Say That You Care" (US-only release)	1988	—	—	—	—	—	—	—	—	—	Sophisticated Street
"High Life"	1988	196	—	—	—	—	—	—	—	—	Sophisticated Street
"Step Off"	1990	63	—	—	—	—	—	—	—	—	Stand Strong
"Stand Strong"	1990	—	—	—	—	—	—	—	—	—	Stand Strong
"Better Part of Me" (US-only release)	1991	—	—	—	—	—	—	—	51	—	Stand Strong
"Morning Will Come"	1991	81	—	—	—	—	—	—	—	—	Stand Strong
"Then Came You"	1992	32	—	—	—	—	—	—	—	—	Renewal
"All Over the World"	1992	74	—	—	—	—	—	—	—	—	Renewal
"Lysander's Theme (Lovers After All)" (with Ruby Turner)	1993	—	—	—	—	—	—	—	—	—	Non-album single
"I Like It" (Germany-only release)	1995	—	—	—	—	—	—	—	—	—	Honesty
"Mama Used to Say" (with Mumzy Stranger)	2011	—	—	—	—	—	—	—	—	—	Non-album single
"Can You Feel It" (with Sinitta and Kym Mazelle)	2021	—	—	—	—	—	—	—	—	—	Re-Discovered 80's
"Sweet Tender Love"	2024	—	—	—	—	—	—	—	—	—	Non-album single
"—" denotes releases that did not chart or were not released in that territory.
