= There's Nothing Like This =

1990 studio album by Omar

Studio album by Omar
- Released: 1990, 1991 (reissue)
- Genre: R&B; neo soul
- Label: Kongo Records; Talkin' Loud
- Producer: Godwin Logie; Omar and the Family

Omar chronology
There's Nothing Like This (1990)	Music (1992)

Professional ratings
Review scores
Source	Rating
AllMusic	3/5 stars
Encyclopedia of Popular Music	3/5 stars
NME	(favorable)

There's Nothing Like This is the first album by the British neo soul singer Omar. It includes his biggest hit, "There's Nothing Like This", which reached number 14 in the UK Singles Chart in 1991. It also peaked at number 8 in the Music Week Dance Singles Chart. On the release of the song, Alan Jones from Music Week commented, "Expensively acquired from the indie Kongo Dance label, Omar's slow, sinewy sleeper from last year is a surefire smash. The young Londoner has been attracting massive audiences at live shows. If he can go on delivering material like this intimately and excellently vocalised swayer he will soon repay Talkin Loud's investment. Top 10 material."

== Track listing ==
All tracks written by Omar, except where noted.

1. "There's Nothing Like This"
2. "Don't Mean a Thing"
3. "You and Me" (Omar, Byron Lye-Fook)
4. "Positive"
5. "I'm in Love"
6. "Meaning of Life" (Omar, Tom Simpson)
7. "Stop Messing Around" (Omar, Simpson)
8. "Serious Style"
9. "I Don't Mind the Waiting"
10. "Fine" (a cappella)
11. "There's Nothing Like This" (remix)

== Personnel ==
- Backing vocals – Caron Wheeler (track 5), Edi Eminike (tracks 2, 4, 5, 7), Naomi Thompson (track 5), Omar (tracks 1, 2, 4–9, 11), Vannessa Simon (tracks 2, 4–8)
- Bass guitar – Omar (tracks 1, 11)
- Design, typography [Typographics] – Swifty (track 3)
- DJ mix (mixing) – Roland "Scratch Professor" Lye Fook (tracks 5, 9)
- Drum programming – Omar (tracks 2, 4–8)
- Drums – Omar (tracks 1, 9, 11)
- Guitar – Paul Belben (track 3), Phil Hudson (tracks 1, 2, 9, 11)
- Instruments (all other) – Omar (track 5)
- Lead vocals – Omar (tracks 1, 2, 4–9, 11)
- Mastered by – Geoff Pesche
- Percussion – Len Lawrence (track 3), Omar (tracks 1, 8, 11), Paul Belben (track 3)
- Photography – Nick White (4)
- Producer – Godwin Logie (tracks 3, 9), Omar and the Family (tracks 1, 2, 4–8, 10, 11)
- Programmed by – Omar (track 9)
- Rap – Omar (track 4)
- Remix, additional production – Omar and the Family (tracks 1, 2, 4, 7, 11)
- Scratches – Roland "Scratch Professor" Lye Fook (tracks 4, 5, 9)
- Synth – Omar (track 9)
- Synthesizer Korg M1 – Omar (tracks 1, 2, 4–8, 11)
- Synthesizer Roland D-50 – Omar (track 5)
- Vocals (all – Omar (track 10)
- Vocals (duet) – Omar (track 3), Vannessa Simon (track 3)
- Written by – Simpson (tracks 6, 7)
- Written by – Lye Fook (track 3), Hammer (track 1, 2, 4–11)
- Written by (rap) – Nick Stains (track 4)

== Charts ==
Chart (1990–91)	Peak position
UK Albums Chart	54
UK Albums Chart (reissue)	19
