= Oh Louise =

1985 single by Junior

Single by Junior Giscombe

from the album Acquired Taste
- Released: 1985
- Recorded: 1985
- Genre: Soul; R&B; new jack swing
- Label: London
- Songwriters: Junior Giscombe, Robin Smith
- Producer: Junior Giscombe

Junior Giscombe singles chronology
"Do You Really Want My Love" (1985)	"Oh Louise" (1985)	"Come On Over" (1986)

Music video
- "Oh Louise" on YouTube

"Oh Louise" is a single by English artist Junior, initially released as part of his third studio album, Acquired Taste, in 1985. The song was reissued in 1986, where it gained more success, becoming a top 15 hit on the R&B charts. Written by Junior Giscombe and Robin Smith, the song was also produced by Junior and was released through London Records. for the week ending May 24, 1986. It also ranked 13 in sales and 15 in airplay.

== Influence on New Jack Swing ==
Oh Louise has been credited by some music critics, as well as Teddy Riley and Lenny White, as one of the early precursors to the new jack swing genre. While new jack swing became more widely recognized in the late 1980s, the song's fusion of R&B, soul, and upbeat, syncopated rhythms helped lay the groundwork for what would later be popularized by producers like Teddy Riley. Junior's incorporation of danceable grooves with soulful vocals showcased an emerging sound that would eventually define the new jack swing movement. Junior recounted how Grammy-winning jazz drummer Lenny White told him:

“You do realise that it was Oh Louise that started New Jack Swing?!”

Junior also claimed that producer Teddy Riley, considered one of the founders of new jack swing, remarked:

“If it wasn’t for Oh Louise there would be no Swing Beat.”

== Reception ==
For his third album, Acquired Taste, Junior Giscombe teamed with legendary producer Arif Mardin. The album included the joyous track "Oh Louise". Which failed to make much of a mark in the US market.

== Track listings ==
7"

1. "Oh Louise" – 3:50
2. "Oh Louise" – 3:50

12"

1. "Oh Louise" – 6:50
2. "Oh Louise" – 6:50

== Personnel ==
- Junior Giscombe - lead vocals, songwriter, producer, mixed by
- Robin Smith - songwriter
- John Gallen - remixer

== Charts ==
Chart	Peak position
UK Singles (OCC)	74
UK Singles (OCC) (1986 reissue)	83
US Hot Black Singles (1986 reissue)	14
