= Sing (If You Want It) =

Studio album by Omar
- Released: 25 April 2006
- Genre: R&B; neo soul
- Length: 61:45
- Label: Ether Records
- Producer: Omar; Scratch Professor

Omar chronology
Best By Far (2001)	Sing (If You Want It) (2006)

Professional ratings
Review scores
Source	Rating
AllMusic	4/5 stars

Sing (If You Want It) is the sixth album by British neo-soul singer Omar, released in April 2006 on Omar's own Ether label. Sing (If You Want It) was produced by Omar and his brother, Scratch Professor, and features guest appearances from long-time Omar fans Stevie Wonder and Angie Stone, as well as rapper Common and British artists Estelle and Rodney P.

== Track listing ==
1. "Lift Off" (Lye-Fook) 1:46
2. "Sing (If You Want It)" (Lye-Fook) 4:38
3. "Be a Man" (Bentley/Lye-Fook) 4:41 (Performed by Omar and J.C. Bentley)
4. "Kiss It Right" (Lye-Fook) 5:06
5. "Get It Together" (Lye-Fook/Palladino) 4:43
6. "Your Mess" (Lye-Fook) 4:28
7. "All for Me" (Lye-Fook/Stone) 3:44 (Performed by Omar and Angie Stone)
8. "It's So..." (Lye-Fook) 4:30
9. "Gimme Sum" (Ashman/Canitbe/Lye-Fook/Lynn/P) 4:49 (Performed by Omar, Common, Rodney P, Canitbe and Ashman)
10. "Feeling You" (Lye-Fook/Wonder) 4:48 (Performed by Omar and Stevie Wonder)
11. "Lay It Down" (Lye-Fook/Swaray) 4:55 (Performed by Omar and Estelle)
12. "I Want It" (Lye-Fook) 3:53
13. "Stylin'" (Lye-Fook/Stone) 4:48 (Performed by Omar and Angie Stone)
14. "Ghana Emotion" (Lye-Fook) 4:56
