= Every Step =

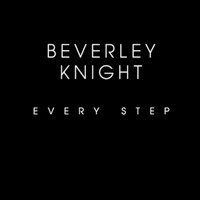

Single by Beverley Knight

from the album 100%
- Released: 6 July 2009 (free download); 7 September 2009 (released with "Beautiful Night")
- Recorded: 2008
- Genre: R&B; Soul
- Length: 3:23 (radio edit); 4:16 (album version)
- Label: Hurricane Records
- Songwriters: Beverley Knight, James Harris III, Terry Lewis, Cedric Perrier, Bobby Ross Avila, Issiah J. Avila, J. Najera
- Producers: Jimmy Jam & Terry Lewis, co-produced by Bobby Ross Avila, Issiah "IV" Avila

Beverley Knight singles chronology
"The Queen of Starting Over" (2007)	"Every Step" (2009)	"Beautiful Night" (2009)

"Every Step" is the promotional single released from British singer-songwriter Beverley Knight's sixth studio album, 100%. It was co-written by Knight with Cedric Perrier, Jimmy Jam and Terry Lewis, who also produced the track.

The song was added to BBC Radio 2's B-list on 17 June 2009. It was released as a free download on 6 July 2009 for two weeks.

"Every Step" subsequently received a digital download single release on 7 September 2009, alongside lead single "Beautiful Night".

Knight was interviewed and performed the song for the first time on television on GMTV on 4 September 2009. It does not have a music video. "Every Step" also featured in the 100% promotional television advert.

== Track listings ==
=== 6 July 2009 ===
Free Digital download

1. "Every Step" (radio edit) – 3:24

=== 7 September 2009 ===
Amazon Digital maxi download bundle

1. "Beautiful Night" (radio mix) – 3:22
2. "Every Step" (radio edit) – 3:24
3. "Beautiful Night" (Crazy Cousinz Club mix) – 4:11
4. "Beautiful Night" (Crazy Cousinz Club mix edit) (Amazon Exclusive) – 3:09
5. "Beautiful Night" (Crazy Cousinz Funky mix) – 3:53
6. "Beautiful Night" (album version) – 4:14

iTunes Digital maxi download bundle

1. "Beautiful Night" (radio mix) – 3:22
2. "Every Step" (radio edit) – 3:24
3. "Beautiful Night" (Crazy Cousinz Club mix) – 4:11
4. "Beautiful Night" (Crazy Cousinz Funky mix) – 3:53
5. "Beautiful Night" (acoustic version) (iTunes Exclusive)
6. "Beautiful Night" (album version) – 4:14

Play Digital maxi download bundle

1. "Beautiful Night" (radio mix) – 3:22
2. "Every Step" (radio edit) – 3:24
3. "Beautiful Night" (Crazy Cousinz Club mix) – 4:11
4. "Beautiful Night" (Crazy Cousinz Funky mix) – 3:53
5. "Beautiful Night" (Crazy Cousinz Club mix instrumental) (Play Exclusive)
6. "Beautiful Night" (album version) – 4:14
