= It's Too Late =

It's Too Late may refer to:

== Albums ==
- It's Too Late, an album by Wilson Pickett 1967
- It's Too Late, an album by Ferrante & Teicher
- It's Too Late, an album by Bobby Goldsboro

== Songs ==
- "It's Too Late" (Chuck Willis song), 1956
- "It's Too Late" (Bobby Goldsboro song), 1966
- "It's Too Late" (Carole King song), 1971
- "It's Too Late" (Evermore song)
- "It's Too Late" (Lucie Silvas song)
- "It's Too Late to Love Me Now", a song also known as "It's Too Late", most notably recorded by Jeanne Pruett
- "It's Too Late", a song by Jim Carroll from Catholic Boy
- "It's Too Late", a song by Small Faces from Small Faces
- "It's Too Late", a 1963 chart single and album by Wilson Pickett
- "It's Too Late", a song by Bob Mould from Black Sheets of Rain
- "It's Too Late", a song by The Troggs from Trogglodynamite
- "It's Too Late", a song by The Streets from Original Pirate Material
- "It's Too Late", a song by The Kinks from The Kink Kontroversy

== See also ==
- Too Late (disambiguation)
