= Louise Golbey =

British singer

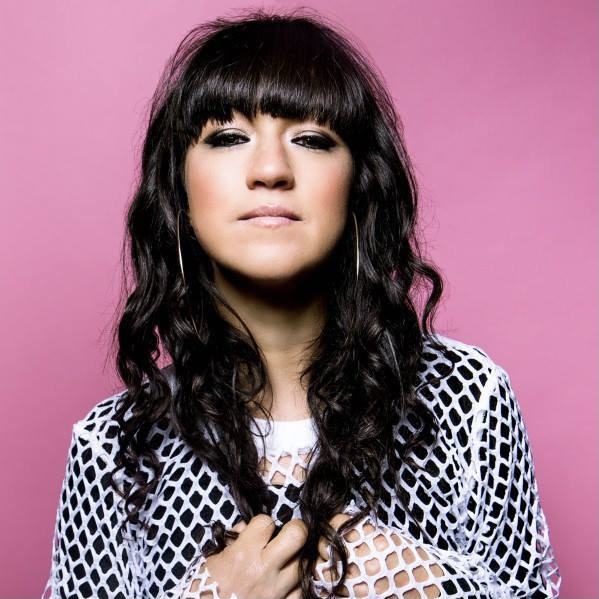
- Louise Golbey

Background information
- Born: London, England
- Genres: Soul, R&B, Pop
- Occupations: Singer, songwriter
- Years active: 2004–present
- Website: louisegolbey.com

Louise Golbey is a British singer, songwriter, and musician on the live music scene of London and beyond.

== Career ==
Born in London, Golbey grew up in a musical family. Her grandfather played classical violin. Her uncle plays piano and her mother sings. Brought up in Bournemouth, she moved back to her home city of London after university to pursue a music career. She has released several EPs, singles and an album and has been getting support from DJs on BBC 1 Xtra, BBC 6 Music, Jazz FM, Mi Soul, BBC Radio 2 and radio stations across Europe. Golbey was also November's Caffe Nero Artist of The Month. Her 2015 album Novel featured a track with Omar and Mo Pleasure (a musician who has worked with Michael Jackson, Earth Wind and Fire and Ray Charles).

She has written with Rob Davis, who co-wrote songs such as "Can't Get You Out of My Head", "Toca's Miracle" and "Groovejet (If This Ain't Love)".

She also hosts the Songwriters Podcast, produced by Unedited (in association with PRS for Music and The Ivors Academy) and is now in its fourth series.

She has released several EPs and singles independently and her first album, Novel (2015), was mixed and mastered by Drew “Beats” Horley and included special guests Omar and Morris Pleasure and featured one track produced by Grammy Award-winning producer Aamir Yaqub.

Golbey sings "In My Dream" on the global advert for the Mercedes EQS electric car, which was played around the world on multiple channels and in cinemas.

Golbey's second album, Renaissance, was released on March 25, 2022. It featured the title track (which she released as a single in 2021) which contains a sample of Aswad 's "Warrior Charge". The album also featured a track with record-holding Canadian rapper D.O., as well as other collaborations with top producers and songwriters.

She has released her third studio album called On With The Show, which featured tracks with Nate James and British rapper KINETIK. The album was mastered by Simon Francis, who mastered Olivia Dean 's album The Art Of Loving.

== Gigs and tours ==
She has played at London venues such as Ronnie Scotts, the London Hippodrome, and The Jazz Café. She has performed in France (Musique Cordiale Festival, Provence) and Germany (Cascadas Bar in Hamburg), at the Glastonbury Festival via BBC Introducing, the Isle of Wight Festival, and the London Jazz Festival. She was the opening act for George Benson at Kenwood House Picnic Concert and supported the Stylistics on their UK tour.

She has worked on tracks with Example and Newham Generals and has shared the stage with Ed Sheeran, Jessie J, Anthony David, Roy Ayers, Katy B, Paloma Faith, Mr Hudson, Lianne La Havas, Omar, Alexander O'Neal, Heatwave (band) Kenny Thomas, En Vogue, Dexter Wansel, Eric Benet and Evelyn "Champagne" King.

In September 2019 she performed at The Electric Soul Festival in London's O2 Arena supporting Kool and The Gang, Brand New Heavies, Level 42 and Heather Small.

Her music video for "How It Is" (which she also recorded in French) was nominated in the UK Music Video Awards. She was chosen as Caffe Nero Artist of the Month following Jack Savoretti.

Her 2019 single 'Different' was co-written with a produced by Dan Dare (aka Slang).

== Songwriting and podcast ==
Golbey co-wrote and sang the theme tune for UK comedy series Sex, Lattes and Hideous Dates for Amazon Prime.

In 2020, in addition to working on her second album with the single release "Scarlet Woman", produced by Mafro W (guitarist for Ghetts and Shakka, she was writing with Rob Davis. Golbey has also started a podcast called What You Didn't Know About... where she interviews some of the top UK songwriters about their songwriting process and meanings behind their most successful songs.

== Discography ==
Year	Release
2008	Acoustic Sessions (EP)
2008	"Cling To Me" (single)
2009	"The Sea and Me" (single)
2009	How It Is (EP)
2010	"Mr Potential" (single)
2010	"A Little While Longer" (single)
2011	"Weigh a Ton" (single)
2011	"C'est Juste Comme Ca" (single)
2012	Keep My Feelings Hush (EP)
2012	"Game Player" (feat. Lyric L) (single)
2013	"Up To Me" (single)
2013	"Something's Got To Give" (single)
2014	Lots To Give (EP)
2015/2016	Novel (album)
2016	"Please Don't" (single)
2016	"Little Bird" (single)
2017	Love It or Leave It (EP)
2017	Love It or Leave It – Deluxe Edition (EP)
2018	"Still" (single)
2018	"A Good Life" – (single)
2019	"Different" – (single)
2020	"Scarlet Woman" – (single)
2020	"Crave" – (collaboration with Rob Davis – single)
2021	"In The Meantime" – (collaboration single)
2021	"Signum" – (collaboration single)
2021	"Renaissance" – (single)
2022	Renaissance – (album)
2024	All For You – (single)
2025	Friday Night ft. Kinetik – (single)
2025	Red Flags – (single)
2026	On With The Show – (album)
