= Beautiful Night (Beverley Knight song) =

Single by Beverley Knight

from the album 100%
- Released: 7 September 2009
- Recorded: 2008
- Genre: R&B; Soul
- Length: 3:22 (radio/video mix); 4:14 (album version)
- Label: Hurricane Records
- Songwriters: Beverley Knight, Amanda Ghost, Ian Dench, James Diring, Jody Street
- Producer: The Rural

Beverley Knight singles chronology
"Every Step" (2009)	"Beautiful Night" (2009)	"In Your Shoes" (2009)

"Beautiful Night" is the first and lead single released from British singer-songwriter Beverley Knight's sixth studio album, 100%. It was released independently via her own record label, Hurricane Records, on 7 September 2009 as a digital download only.

The official radio premiere of "Beautiful Night" was on 20 July 2009 on radio station BRMB and it was later added to BBC Radio 2's playlist where it peaked on the B-list.

== Background and production ==
The song was co-written by Knight and Ivor Novello Award winning Amanda Ghost and was produced by The Rural. Knight explained the lyrics are about love and loss: "It’s about holding on to the moment you are in”, she said, “because sooner or later you may have to say goodbye to that person you love."

== Critical reception ==
Jason Palmer from Entertainment Focus said "Beautiful Night is a very melodic and catchy tune that could be a radio favourite given the right exposure .. It's emotionally charged with an uplifting chorus and poignant theme throughout". Indie London's Jack Foley said of the song "Beautiful Night drops a great beat and some tinkling piano loops over a soulful set of vocals to deliver an early highlight".

== Track listings ==
Digital download

1. "Beautiful Night" (radio mix) – 3:22

Amazon Digital maxi download bundle

1. "Beautiful Night" (radio mix) – 3:22
2. "Every Step" (radio edit) – 3:24
3. "Beautiful Night" (Crazy Cousinz Club mix) – 4:11
4. "Beautiful Night" (Crazy Cousinz Club mix edit) (Amazon Exclusive) – 3:09
5. "Beautiful Night" (Crazy Cousinz Funky mix) – 3:53
6. "Beautiful Night" (album version) – 4:14

iTunes Digital maxi download bundle

1. "Beautiful Night" (radio mix) – 3:22
2. "Every Step" (radio edit) – 3:24
3. "Beautiful Night" (Crazy Cousinz Club mix) – 4:11
4. "Beautiful Night" (Crazy Cousinz Funky mix) – 3:53
5. "Beautiful Night" (acoustic version) (iTunes Exclusive)
6. "Beautiful Night" (album version) – 4:14

Play Digital maxi download bundle

1. "Beautiful Night" (radio mix) – 3:22
2. "Every Step" (radio edit) – 3:24
3. "Beautiful Night" (Crazy Cousinz Club mix) – 4:11
4. "Beautiful Night" (Crazy Cousinz Funky mix) – 3:53
5. "Beautiful Night" (Crazy Cousinz Club mix instrumental) (Play Exclusive)
6. "Beautiful Night" (album version) – 4:14

== Charts ==
Chart (2009)	Peak Position
UK Singles Chart	96
UK R&B Singles Chart	28
