= Le Commandant Couche-Tôt =

Berlin-based French musician and composer

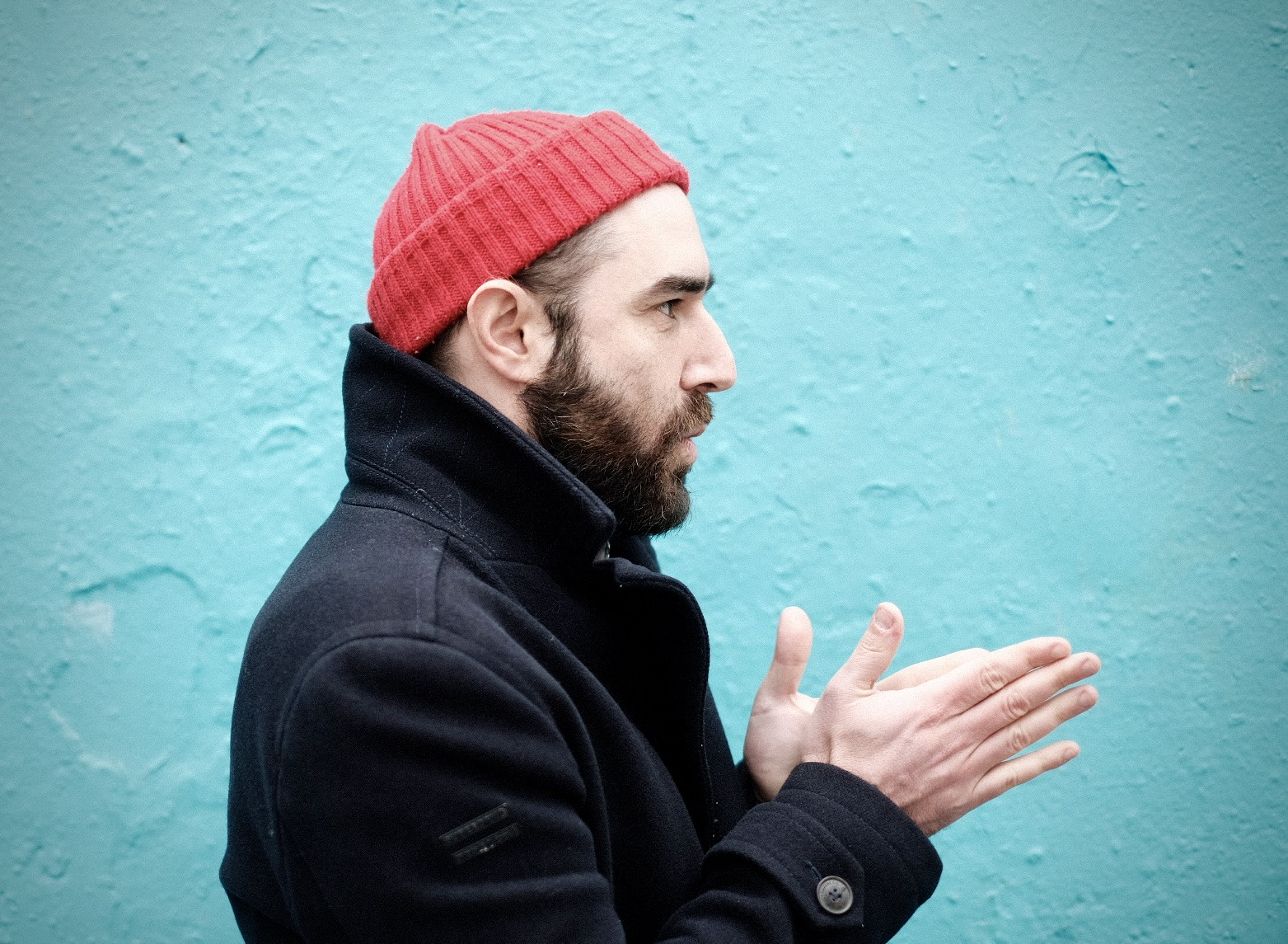
- Born: Anthony Malka; Senlis, France
- Occupation: Musician
- Musical career
- Origin: Paris, France
- Genres: Funk; Electro
- Instrument: Keyboards
- Label: BMM Records

Le Commandant Couche-Tôt is a musical project started in 2018 by French Berlin-based classically trained pianist, composer and educator Anthony Malka. In 2020, Le Commandant Couche-Tôt released its first EP, Le Commandant Couche-Tôt Et Son Magnifique Orchestre De Claviers, on French label Black Milk Music. A second EP, Une Histoire d'Amour Brésilienne, followed in January 2022.

== Career ==
Le Commandant Couche-Tôt is the brainchild of Berlin-based French funk musician, composer and keyboardist Anthony Malka. After co-founding funk band The Hoo in Berlin, he decided to embark on a new personal project that would mix his funk influences along with French pop icons such as Serge Gainsbourg.

Le Commandant Couche-Tôt released his first EP, Le Commandant Couche-Tôt Et Son Magnifique Orchestre De Claviers, in 2020. It received some recognition and airplays worldwide, including David Blot (Radio Nova), Jeremy Sole (KCWR), Macca (NTS), Andrew Jervis (Bandcamp Weekly), FIP, interview on RTBF, a guest mix on Belgian Kiosk Radio and Rinse France plus features on several big playlists on both Deezer and Spotify The release was also noticed across the pond, with British music journalists showing interest.

A new track from Le Commandant Couche-Tôt's second EP entitled "L'été indien" and featuring British soul singer Omar Lye-Fook, was released on Bandcamp on October 8, 2021. A second EP, Une Histoire d'Amour Brésilienne, followed on January 7, 2022, also featuring contributions from former Jamiroquai drummer Nick Van Gelder and Brazilian bassist Alex Malheiros.

== Discography ==
Extended plays

- Le Commandant Couche-Tôt Et Son Magnifique Orchestre De Claviers (2020)
- Une Histoire d'Amour Brésilienne (2022)
- Discordance (2025)
- L.A Partie (2026)
- The lost tapes vol.1 (2026)

Singles

- "Le Chevalier du Zodiac" (2020)
- "Bise Mort Gun" (2020)
- "L'été indien", feat. Omar Lye-Fook (2021)
- "Amazonas / Ivre de la Jungle" (2021)
- "Lose It" feat. Johnny Burgos (2022)
- "Gratis Liebe" feat. Tremendous Aron & Nelson Brandt (2023)
- "Prelude" feat. Tremendous Aron (2024)
- "Maja/Butterfies" (2024)
- "Lovid-19" (2024)
- "Voyage" (2024)
- "Mirage" (2025)
- "Samba de Outono" feat. Knowsum & Grégoire Pignède (2026)

== Bibliography ==
- Berlin Stories (2006-2020) - e. Book (2025)
