= Heaven Knows (Jaki Graham album) =

1985 studio album by Jaki Graham

Studio album by Jaki Graham
- Released: September 1985
- Studio: Red Bus, RG Jones, Odyssey and EMI, London; Unique, New York; The Playhouse, England
- Genre: R&B; synth-pop; soul; funk
- Length: 42:20
- Label: EMI; Capitol; Parlophone
- Producer: Derek Bramble

Jaki Graham chronology
Heaven Knows (1985)	Breaking Away (1986)

Singles from Heaven Knows
- 1. "What's the Name of Your Game" Released: May 1984; 2. "Heaven Knows" Released: July 1984; 3. "Once More with the Feeling" Released: September 1984; 4. "Could It Be I'm Falling in Love" Released: March 1985; 5. "Round and Around" Released: June 1985; 6. "Heaven Knows (reissue)" Released: August 1985

Heaven Knows is the debut studio album by British soul singer Jaki Graham. It was released in September 1985 by EMI Records.

== Critical reception ==
Professional ratings
Review scores
Source	Rating
Record Mirror	3.5/5 stars

Paul Sexton of Record Mirror felt that "the sound's just that bit too fierce, too hi-tech almost, for her to shine", and that overall, "for the singles, excellent; for some of the rest, Jaki can and will do miles better".

In Smash Hits, Chris Heath said the album contained "three great singles" including the title track, but added, "it's only a shame she's failed to rustle up a few more songs of that quality. Most of the rest - written not by Jakie but producer Derek Bramble - are nothing but bland, unmemorable sludge."

== Track listing ==
All tracks are written by Derek Bramble, except where noted.

Side one
No.	Title	Writer(s)	Length
1.	"Round and Around"		4:19
2.	"Heaven Knows"		5:03
3.	"Could It Be I'm Falling in Love" (featuring David Grant)	Melvin Steals	4:20
4.	"I Fell for You"	Billy Jones; Bramble	4:30
5.	"Hold On"	Bramble; Robin Smith	3:44

Side two
No.	Title	Writer(s)	Length
1.	"The Facts of Love"		4:08
2.	"You're Mine"		3:29
3.	"Loving You" (featuring Derek Bramble)		3:46
4.	"What's the Name of Your Game"		4:09
5.	"Stay the Way You Are"	U. Walls	4:52

- Sides one and two were combined as tracks 1–10 on EMI/Fame CD edition.

== Charts ==
Chart (1985)	Peak position
UK Albums (OCC)	48
