= Mr Creosote =

Minor character from Monty Python's The Meaning of Life

- Mr Creosote (Terry Jones), with the maître d' (John Cleese, right) and second waiter (Eric Idle, left)
- First appearance: Monty Python's The Meaning of Life (1983)
- Created by: Monty Python
- Portrayed by: Terry Jones

In-universe information
- Gender: Male

Mr Creosote is a fictional character who appears in Monty Python's The Meaning of Life. He is a monstrously obese and vulgar restaurant patron who is served a vast amount of food and alcohol as he vomits repeatedly. After being persuaded to eat an after-dinner mint – "It's only wafer-thin" – he graphically explodes. The sequence opens the film's segment titled "Part VI: The Autumn Years".

The character is played by Terry Jones, who directed the film. According to Jones, John Cleese, who played the Maître d'hôtel, struggled to keep a straight face saying "wafer-thin mint" and also struggled to get out of shot without bursting into laughter.

== Synopsis ==
In the sequence, Mr Creosote dines at a French restaurant. The entrance of this morbidly obese middle-aged man is accompanied by ominous music. One of the fish in the aquarium exclaims, "Oh shit, it's Mr Creosote!" as he passes, causing all the fish to swim for cover. The scene opens with a short dialogue between Mr Creosote (who speaks with a coarse Cockney accent) and the maître d'hôtel (who speaks with a fake, exaggerated French accent), played by John Cleese:

- Maître d': "Ah, good afternoon, sir; and how are we today?"
- Mr Creosote: "Better."
- Maître d': "Better?"
- Mr. Creosote: "Better get a bucket, I'm gonna throw up."

Creosote is then led to his table and, once seated, starts projectile-vomiting, generally failing to hit the provided bucket. The floor quickly becomes covered in vomitus, and so do the cleaning woman and the maître d's trousers. Creosote listens patiently while the restaurant's appetisers are read out to him by the maître d', and after vomiting on the menu held open in front of him, he orders every item on the menu :

- Mr. Creosote: "I'll have the lot."
- Maître d': "A wise choice, monsieur!"

He is served moules marinières, pâté de foie gras, beluga caviar, Eggs Benedict, a leek tart, frogs' legs amandine and quail's eggs with puréed mushrooms all mixed in a bucket with the quail eggs on top and a double helping of pâté. The appetizers are followed by the main course of jugged hare, with a sauce of truffles, bacon, Grand Marnier, anchovies and cream. For drinks, Mr. Creosote has six bottles of Château Latour 1945, a Methuselah (6 litres) of champagne, and half a dozen crates of brown ale (144 bottles)—considerably less than his usual fare.

- Maître d': Bon, and the usual brown ales ...?
- Mr Creosote: Yeah... No, wait a minute ... I think I can only manage six crates today.

He finishes the feast, and several other courses, vomiting profusely all over himself, his table, and the restaurant's staff throughout his meal, causing other diners to lose their appetite and, in some cases, throw up as well. The audience, however, never sees Creosote eating, with the sole exception of him seemingly chewing on a whole pineapple towards the end of the sequence. Finally, after being convinced by the Maître d' to eat a single "wafer-thin mint", his stomach begins to rapidly expand until it explodes: covering the restaurant and diners with viscera and partially digested food—even starting a "vomit-wave" among the other diners, who leave in disgust.

Creosote is amazingly still alive when the explosion clears, but his chest cavity and abdomen are now blasted open, revealing his spread ribs and intact, still-beating heart and viscera. As he looks around, seemingly confused by what has just happened, the Maître d' calmly walks up to him and presents, "monsieur, the cheque".

== Production ==
In the documentary The Meaning of Making 'The Meaning of Life' (2003), John Cleese said that the sequence, originally written by Jones and Michael Palin, was initially rejected. Cleese said the initial version had suffered from a flawed construction, so he rewrote it with Graham Chapman. At the U.S. Comedy Arts Festival — Tribute to Monty Python it was claimed Cleese was taken with the unflappable maître d' character. Jones thought Creosote should be played by fellow Python Terry Gilliam, before Gilliam persuaded Jones to play the role instead.

Jones was transformed into Mr Creosote by British prosthetic make-up artist Christopher Tucker, who also created the prosthetic effects for the American film drama The Elephant Man (1980). An outdoor shot in which Creosote approaches the restaurant wheeling his gut on a caster was omitted from the film.

The fake vomitus consisted of large amounts of condensed minestrone soup, which made a considerable mess of the filming location, the Porchester Centre in Bayswater, West London.

== Reception ==
Film director Quentin Tarantino said that the "Mr Creosote" scene was the only time he was unable to view a graphic film sequence, recollecting, "If somebody vomits, and I actually smell vomit while I'm watching this, I'm just going to hurl!"

George Harrison of The Beatles, who co-founded production company Handmade Films to fund the making of Life of Brian and other later projects by Python members, noted the similarity between the Mr Creosote episode and the scene in Magical Mystery Tour where John Lennon, dressed as a waiter, serves pasta to Ringo Starr's fictional Aunt Jessie using a spade to build a giant mound of spaghetti on the table.

In his 2015 Movie Guide, Leonard Maltin described Mr Creosote as having "an unforgettable scene, like it or not".

British extreme metal band Anaal Nathrakh reference Mr Creosote in their song "The Age of Starlight Ends".

Noting that creosote is a fossil fuel product, Andreas Malm and Wim Carton interpret the scene as an illustration of the non-linear effects of climate change in their 2025 book The Long Heat.

== Bibliography ==
- Carroll, Noël (2006). "What Mr. Creosote Knows About Laughter". In Hardcastle, Gary L.; Reisch, George A. (eds.). Monty Python and Philosophy: Nudge Nudge, Think Think!. Chicago, Illinois: Open Court Publishing. pp. 25–36. ISBN 0-8126-9593-3.
