= Monty Python's The Meaning of Life =

1983 film by British comedy group Monty Python

- Theatrical release poster
- Directed by: Terry Jones
- Written by: Graham Chapman; John Cleese; Terry Gilliam; Eric Idle; Terry Jones; Michael Palin
- Produced by: John Goldstone
- Starring: Graham Chapman; John Cleese; Terry Gilliam; Eric Idle; Terry Jones; Michael Palin
- Cinematography: Peter Hannan
- Edited by: Julian Doyle
- Music by: John Du Prez
- Production companies: Celandine Films; The Monty Python Partnership
- Distributed by: Universal Pictures (through United International Pictures)
- Release dates: 31 March 1983 (United States); 23 June 1983 (United Kingdom)
- Running time: 90 minutes
- Country: United Kingdom
- Language: English
- Budget: $9 million
- Box office: $42.7 million

Monty Python's The Meaning of Life, also known simply as The Meaning of Life, is a 1983 British musical sketch comedy film written and performed by the Monty Python troupe, directed by Terry Jones. The Meaning of Life was the last feature film to star all six Python members before the death of Graham Chapman in 1989.

Unlike Holy Grail and Life of Brian, the film's two predecessors, which each told a single, more-or-less coherent story, The Meaning of Life returned to the sketch format of the troupe's original television series and their first film from twelve years earlier, And Now for Something Completely Different, loosely structured as a series of comic sketches about the various stages of life. It was accompanied by the short film The Crimson Permanent Assurance.

Released on 23 June 1983 in the United Kingdom, The Meaning of Life was not as acclaimed as its predecessors, but was still well received critically and was a minor box office success; the film grossed almost $43 million against a $9 million budget. It was screened at the 1983 Cannes Film Festival, where it won the Grand Prix. The film appears in a 2010 list of the top 20 cult films published in The Boston Globe.

== Plot ==
Six fish in a restaurant's tank greet each other, then see their friend being eaten. This leads them to question the meaning of life. In the first sketch, "The Miracle of Birth", maternity doctors ignore a woman in labour while trying to impress the hospital's administrator. In Yorkshire, a Catholic man is made redundant from his job, and informs his numerous children that he must sell them for scientific experiments. A Protestant man looks on disapprovingly and proudly remarks that Protestants can use contraception and have sex for pleasure (although his wife observes that they never do).

In "Growth and Learning", a class of boys learns school etiquette before partaking in a sex education lesson, which involves watching their teacher have sex with his wife. One boy laughs and is forced into a violent rugby match pitting pupils against the school masters as punishment. "Fighting Each Other" features three scenes concerning the British military. First, during the Battle of the Somme in World War I, a British officer tries to rally his men during an attack, but they instead present him with going-away gifts. Second, a modern army RSM bullies his soldiers to say what they would rather be doing than marching drills, then dismisses each in turn. And lastly, in 1879 during the Anglo-Zulu War, during the Battle of Rorke's Drift, a soldier finds his leg has been bitten off. Suspecting a tiger, the soldiers hunt for it and find two men in a tiger costume.

The hostess introduces "The Middle of the Film", during which bizarre characters challenge the audience in a segment called "Find the Fish". The "Middle Age" involves an American couple visiting a Hawaiian restaurant with a medieval torture theme, where, to the interest of the fish, the waiter offers a conversation about philosophy and the meaning of life. The customers are unable to make sense of it and move on to a discussion of live organ transplants. In "Live Organ Transplants", two paramedics visit an organ donor and forcibly remove his liver while he is alive. His wife is reluctant to donate her liver, but she relents after a man steps out of a refrigerator and reminds her of humanity's insignificance in the universe. Executives of an American conglomerate debate the meaning of life before a raid by The Crimson Permanent Assurance briefly interrupts them.

"The Autumn Years" starts with a musician in a French restaurant singing about the joys of having a penis. As the song ends, the ill-tempered glutton Mr. Creosote enters the restaurant, causing the fish to scatter and hide. He vomits continually and devours an enormous meal. After the maître d'hôtel persuades him to eat an after-dinner mint, Creosote's gut blows up and explodes, splattering all over the other diners. In "The Meaning of Life", the restaurant's cleaning woman proposes that life is meaningless before revealing that she is a racist. A waiter leads the audience to the house where he was born, recalls his mother's lessons about kindness, and then becomes angry when his point trails off.

"Death" features a condemned man choosing the manner of his own execution: being chased off the Cliffs of Dover by topless women in sports gear and falling into his own grave below. In a short animated sequence, despondent leaves commit suicide by throwing themselves from the branches of a tree. The Grim Reaper enters an isolated home and convinces the hosts and dinner guests, with difficulty, that they are all dead. They accompany the Grim Reaper to Heaven, revealed to be the Hawaiian restaurant from earlier. They enter a Las Vegas-style hotel where they meet the characters from the previous sketches, and a Tony Bennett-esque singer begins to sing about how amazing life is where it is always Christmas and various commercial items that can be bought in Heaven are there.

The song abruptly ends for "The End of the Film", where the hostess from "The Middle of the Film" opens an envelope and blandly reveals the meaning of life:

Try and be nice to the other people, avoid eating fat, read a good book every now and then, get some walking in, and try and live together in peace and harmony with people of all creeds and nations.

== Cast ==
- Graham Chapman as Chairman / Fish #1 / Doctor / Harry Blackitt / Wymer / Hordern / General / Coles / Narrator #2 / Dr. Livingstone / Transvestite / Eric / Guest #1 / Arthur Jarrett / Geoffrey / Tony Bennett
- John Cleese as Fish #2 / Dr. Spencer / Humphrey Williams / Sturridge / Ainsworth / Waiter / Eric's Assistant / Maître D' / Grim Reaper
- Terry Gilliam as Window Washer / Fish #4 / Walters / Middle of the Film Announcer / M'Lady Joeline / Mr. Brown / Howard Katzenberg
- Eric Idle as Gunther / Fish #3 / 'Meaning of Life' Singer / Mr. Moore / Mrs. Blackitt / Watson / Blackitt / Atkinson / Perkins / Victim #3 / Front End / Mrs. Hendy / Man in Pink / Noël Coward / Gaston / Angela
- Terry Jones as Bert / Fish #6 / Mum / Priest / Biggs / Sergeant / Man with Bendy Arms / Mrs. Brown / Mr. Creosote / Maria / Leaf Father / Fiona Portland-Smythe
- Michael Palin as Window Washer / Harry / Fish #5 / Mr. Pycroft / Dad / Narrator #1 / Chaplain / Carter / Spadger / Regimental Sergeant Major / Pakenham-Walsh / Rear End / Female TV Presenter / Mr. Marvin Hendy / Governor / Leaf Son / Debbie Katzenberg
- Carol Cleveland as Beefeater Waitress / Wife of Guest #1 / Leaf Mother / Leaf Daughter / Heaven Receptionist
- Simon Jones as Chadwick / Jeremy Portland-Smythe
- Patricia Quinn as Mrs. Williams
- Judy Loe as Nurse #1
- Andrew MacLachlan as Groom / Wycliff / Victim #1 / Guest #3
- Mark Holmes as Victim #2 (Cheerful Severed Head) / Troll Waiter / Guest #2
- Valerie Whittington as Mrs. Moore
- Jennifer Franks as Bride
- Imogen Bickford Smith as Nurse #2
- Angela Mann as Wife of Guest #2
- Peter Lovstrom as Brown's Son
- George Silver as Diner Eating Howard the Fish
- Chris Grant as Narrator
- Matt Frewer as VBCA Executive
- Jane Leeves as Dancer (uncredited)

== Production ==
According to Palin, "the writing process was quite cumbersome. An awful lot of material didn't get used. Holy Grail had a structure, a loose one: the search for the grail. Same with Life of Brian. With this, it wasn't so clear. In the end, we just said: 'Well, what the heck. We have got lots of good material, let's give it the loosest structure, which will be the meaning of life'".

After the film's title was chosen, Douglas Adams called Jones to tell him he had just finished a new book, to be called The Meaning of Liff; Jones was initially concerned about the similarity in titles, which led to the scene in the title sequence of a tombstone which, when hit by a flash of lightning, changes from "The Meaning of Liff" to "The Meaning of Life".

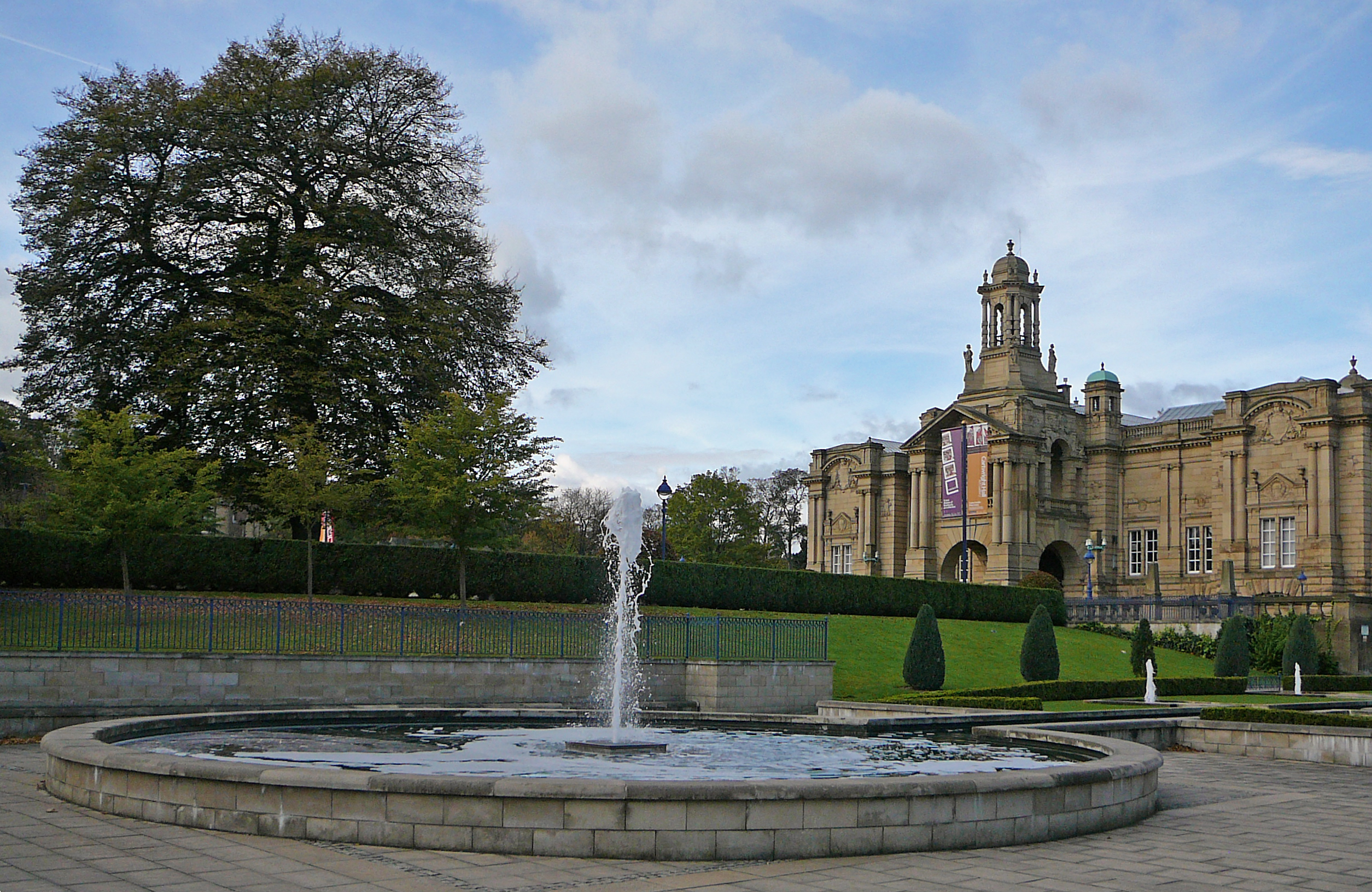
The grounds of Cartwright Hall in Bradford (pictured) was used as a location for the dancing nurses singing "Every Sperm Is Sacred".

Principal photography began on 12 July 1982 and was completed about two months later, on 11 September. A wide variety of locations were used, such as Porchester Hall in Queensway for the Mr Creosote sketch, where hundreds of pounds of fake vomit had to be cleaned up on the last day due to a wedding being scheduled hours later. The Malham Moors were chosen for the Grim Reaper segment; the countryside near Strathblane was used for the Zulu War; and "Every Sperm Is Sacred" was shot in Colne, Lancashire, with interiors done at Elstree Studios. The school chapel scene with the song "O Lord, Please Don't Burn Us" was shot at Churchill College, Cambridge.

The film was produced on a budget of less than US$10 million, which was still bigger than that of the earlier films. This allowed for large-scale choreography and crowd sequences, a more lavishly produced soundtrack that included new original songs, and much more time able to be spent on each sketch, especially The Crimson Permanent Assurance. Palin later said that the larger budget, and not making the film for the BBC (i.e., television), allowed the film to be more daring and dark.

The idea for the hospital sketch came from Chapman, himself a doctor, who had noticed that hospitals were changing, with "lots and lots of machinery". According to Palin, the organ transplant scene harked back to Python's love of bureaucracy, and sketches with lots of people coming round from the council with different bits of paper.

During the filming of the scene where Palin's character explains Catholicism to his children, his line was "that rubber thing at the end of my sock", which was later overdubbed with cock.

=== The Crimson Permanent Assurance ===
The short film The Crimson Permanent Assurance introduces the feature. It is about a group of elderly office clerks working in a small accounting firm. They rebel against yuppie corporate masters, transform their office building into a pirate ship, and raid a large financial district. One of the boardrooms raided reappears later in the film, from shortly before the attack begins until the narrator apologises and a skyscraper falls and crushes the marauders.

The short was intended as an animated sequence in the feature, for placement at the end of Part V. Gilliam persuaded the other members of Monty Python to allow him to produce and direct it as a live action piece instead.

== Release ==
The original tagline read, "It took God six days to create the Heavens and the Earth, and Monty Python just 90 minutes to screw it up" (the length of The Meaning of Life proper is 90 minutes, but becomes 107 minutes as released with "Our Short Feature Presentation" and The Crimson Permanent Assurance). In an April 2012 re-release held by the American Film Institute, the tagline is altered to read "It took God six days to create the Heavens and the Earth, and Monty Python just 1 hour and 48 minutes to screw it up".

Ireland banned the film on its original release as it had previously done with Monty Python's Life of Brian, but later rated it 15 when it was released on video. In the United Kingdom, the film was rated 18 when released in the cinema and on its first release on video, but it was re-rated 15 in 2000. In the United States of America, the film is rated R.

== Reception ==
=== Box office ===
The film opened in the United States on 31 March 1983. At 257 cinemas it ranked number six at the US box office, grossing US$1,987,853 ($7,734 per screen) in its opening weekend. It played at 554 cinemas at its widest point, and its total gross in the United States and Canada was $14,929,552. In the United Kingdom it opened on 3 screens in London and grossed £49,641 in its first seven days to rank third at the London box office. Internationally it grossed $27.8 million for a worldwide total of $42.7 million.

=== Critical reception ===
Roger Ebert of the Chicago Sun-Times gave the film two and a half stars out of four, calling it a "a barbed, uncompromising attack on generally observed community standards". In The New York Times, Vincent Canby declared it "the Ben Hur of sketch films, which is to say that it's a tiny bit out of proportion", concluding it was amusing, but he wished it were consistently amusing. Variety staff assessed it as disgusting, ridiculous, tactless, but above all, amusing. Gene Siskel of the Chicago Tribune awarded 3 stars out of 4, calling it "fresh and original and delightfully offensive. What more can you ask of a comedy?" Sheila Benson of the Los Angeles Times wrote that the film was full of "raunchy talk, blasphemy (well, sacrilege) and one example of what kids call a totally gnarly, gross-out scene. The problem for the reviewer (to be specific, this reviewer) is when you are laughing this much it makes logging all the fast-flying offenses almost impossible." Gary Arnold of The Washington Post was negative, writing that "The strongest impressions left by this picture have less to do with its largely tedious attempts to burlesque human weakness and pomposity than with the group's failure to evolve a coherent satiric outlook." A review by Steve Jenkins in The Monthly Film Bulletin was also negative, writing that the return to a sketch format constituted a "great leap backwards" for the troupe and that the film's outrageous moments "cannot disguise the overall air of déjà vu and playing it safe."

In 2007, Empire's Ian Nathan rated it three of five stars, describing it as "too piecemeal and unfocused, but it possesses some of their most iconic musings and inspired madness". In 2014, The Daily Telegraph gave the film four stars out of five. In his 2015 Movie Guide, Leonard Maltin awarded it three stars, calling it "A barrel of bellylaughs", identifying the Mr. Creosote and "Every Sperm Is Sacred" sketches as the most memorable.

Family Guy creator Seth MacFarlane states: "I view Monty Python as the great originator of that combination [provocative humour and high-quality original music]. The Meaning of Life in particular comes to mind, and my favorite example is 'Every Sperm Is Sacred'. It's so beautifully written, it's musically and lyrically legit, the orchestrations are fantastic, the choreography and the presentation are very, very complex – it's treated seriously." The review aggregator website Rotten Tomatoes gives the film a rating of 86% based on 37 reviews, with an average rating of 7.30/10. The website's critical consensus reads, "Monty Python's the Meaning of Life is rude, ribald, and unafraid to take comedic risks – which is to say it should more than satisfy fans of the titular troupe." Metacritic, which uses a weighted average, assigned the film a score of 72 out of 100, based on 11 critics, indicating "generally favorable" reviews.

=== Accolades ===
The Meaning of Life was awarded the Grand Jury Prize at the 1983 Cannes Film Festival. While the Cannes jury, led by William Styron, were fiercely split on their opinions on several films in competition, The Meaning of Life had general support, securing it the second-highest honour after the Palme d'Or for The Ballad of Narayama.

At the 37th British Academy Film Awards, Andre Jacquemin, Dave Howman, Michael Palin and Terry Jones were also nominated for Original Song for "Every Sperm is Sacred." The award went to "Up Where We Belong" in An Officer and a Gentleman.

== Home media ==
A two-disc DVD release in 2003 features a documentary on production and a director's cut, which adds deleted scenes into the film, making it 116 minutes. The first is The Adventures of Martin Luther, inserted after the scene with the Protestant couple talking about condoms. The second is a promotional video about the British army, which comes between the marching around the square scene and the Zulu army scene. The third and last is an extension of the American characters performed by Idle and Palin; they are shown their room and talk about tampons. In Region 1, it was released on Blu-ray to mark its 30th anniversary. In May 2020, it was released on Netflix in the United Kingdom.
