= Absolute E-Sensual =

1995 single by Jaki Graham

Single by Jaki Graham

from the album Real Life
- Released: 26 June 1995
- Studio: Metropolis, London
- Genre: R&B; soul; house (remix)
- Length: 4:21
- Label: Avex UK; Critique
- Songwriters: Rod Gammons; Andrew Klippel; Matt Nelmes; Toby Baker
- Producers: Rod Gammons; Mickey Garcia

Jaki Graham singles chronology
"Ain't Nobody" (1994)	"Absolute E-Sensual" (1995)

Music video
- "Absolute E-Sensual" on YouTube

"Absolute E-Sensual" is a song by British singer-songwriter Jaki Graham, released on 26 June 1995 by Avex UK and Critique as the third and final single from the singer's fourth album, Real Life (1994). The song was co-written by Rod Gammons and produced by him with Mickey Garcia. It became a club hit, peaking at number three on the US Billboard Hot Dance Club Songs chart, with 13 weeks within the chart. Additionally, the song charted in Australia and the UK, peaking at number 54 and 69, respectively. But it was a bigger hit on the UK Dance Chart, reaching number 31, while peaking at number 15 on the UK Pop Tip Club Chart. "Absolute E-Sensual" was also Graham's final charting single.

== Critical reception ==
Larry Flick from Billboard magazine felt that Graham follows her "smashing cover" of "Ain't Nobody" with "a sultry R&B original that has been tweaked for clubland consumption by the reliably creative Teri Bristol and Mark Picchiotti. In their hands, Graham sashays inside a lush house context with the finesse that befits her seasoned career. Do not ignore the song's album version, which kicks an old-school soul vibe." Tim Jeffery from Music Week's RM Dance Update commented, "I know what you're thinking – 'Not another attempt by Jaki to get in on the pop garage act' – and you're partly right. The house mixes are cheesy and cliched with predictable piano breaks and all the rest, but the original swinging funky version is really very good, with an old-school feel that suits Graham's voice far better than the House versions. With midtempo swing tracks regularly hitting the charts now maybe she's finally found her niche again."

== Track listing ==
- 12", US
1. "Absolute E-Sensual" (Jak-D-House Mix) — 6:32
2. "Absolute E-Sensual" (Jak And Forth Dub) — 8:28
3. "Absolute E-Sensual" (Old Skool Club Mix) — 5:30
4. "Absolute E-Sensual" (Old Skool Dub) — 4:48
5. "Absolute E-Sensual" (Smooth & Chunky Club Mix) — 5:31
- CD single, UK
1. "Absolute E-Sensual" (FKB Edit) — 4:18
2. "Absolute E-Sensual" (Sleazesisters Gay And Happy Vibe) — 8:02
3. "Absolute E-Sensual" (FKB Extended Mix) — 5:35
4. "Absolute E-Sensual" (US Old Skool Club Mix) — 5:32
5. "Absolute E-Sensual" (US House Mix) — 6:33
- CD maxi, US
1. "Absolute E-Sensual" (Original Mix) — 4:21
2. "Absolute E-Sensual" (Old Skool Radio Mix) — 4:36
3. "Absolute E-Sensual" (R & B Radio Mix) — 4:36
4. "Absolute E-Sensual" (Jak-D-House Radio Mix) — 4:17
5. "Absolute E-Sensual" (Old Skool Club Mix) — 5:30
6. "Absolute E-Sensual" (Jak-D-House Club Mix) — 6:32

== Charts ==
=== Weekly charts ===
Chart (1995)	Peak position
Australia (ARIA)	54
Scotland (OCC)	69
UK Singles (OCC)	69
UK Dance (OCC)	31
UK Pop Tip Club Chart (Music Week)	15
US Dance Club Play (Billboard)	3

=== Year-end charts ===
Chart (1995)	Position
US Dance Club Play (Billboard)	49

== Release history ==
Region	Date	Format(s)	Label(s)	Ref.
United States	2 May 1995	Rhythmic contemporary radio	Critique	
United Kingdom	26 June 1995	12-inch vinyl; CD; cassette	Avex UK	
Australia	24 July 1995	CD; cassette	Avex D.D.	
