= From Now On (Jaki Graham album) =

Studio album by Jaki Graham
- Released: 4 September 1989 (original release); 24 April 2009 (Parlophone reissue)
- Studios: Abbey Road, London
- Genres: Synth-pop; disco; soul; electro-funk
- Length: 40:03 (1989 original edition); 75:45 (2009 CD reissue edition)
- Labels: EMI; Orpheus; Parlophone
- Producers: David Gamson; Derek Bramble; David Pack

Jaki Graham chronology
Breaking Away (1986)	From Now On (1989)	Real Life (1994)

Singles from From Now On
- 1. "From Now On" Released: June 1989; 2. "The Better Part of Me" Released: August 1989

From Now On is the third studio album by British soul singer Jaki Graham. It was released on 4 September 1989 in the United Kingdom by EMI Records and in the United States by Orpheus Records.

== Release and reception ==
Professional ratings
Review scores
Source	Rating
Allmusic	2/5 stars

Ron Wynn of AllMusic wrote, "A gifted British soul vocalist, Jaki Graham has seldom gotten the kind of songs that her great skills could turn into breakout hits. These are mostly disposable formula filler that she tries to elevate but can't, despite often stunning vocal treatments. She's a great producer away from being a star, and could certainly be a great disco diva with the right tracks."

From Now On was reissued digitally on 24 April 2009 through Parlophone Records.

== Track listing ==
Side one
No.	Title	Writer(s)	Length
1.	"From Now On"	David Gamson; Portor Carroll	3:44
2.	"Provocative"	Derek Bramble	5:31
3.	"The Better Part of Me"	Bramble; Jimmy Scott	5:01
4.	"Faking the Feeling"	Cliff Dawson; Bramble; Preston Glass	4:51
5.	"I Still Run to You" (featuring Phillip Ingram)	David Pack; Michael McDonald	5:02
Total length:			24:09

Side two
No.	Title	Writer(s)	Length
1.	"(Baby) Don't You Want Me"	Bramble	4:34
2.	"I Want to Thank You (Heavenly Father)"	Kevin McCord	3:54
3.	"First in Line"	Paul Chiten; Sue Sheridan	4:13
4.	"Every Little Bit Hurts"	Ed Cobb	3:13
Total length:			15:54

- Sides one and two were combined as tracks 1–9 on CD reissues.

Bonus tracks – 2009 Parlophone reissue
No.	Title	Length
10.	"Nobody's Fool" ("From Now On" B-side version)	4:33
11.	"No More Tears" (7" single version)	3:57
12.	"Set Me Free" ("Breaking Away" version)	3:38
13.	"Have You See Him?" ("No More Tears" B-side version)	4:48
14.	"No More Tears" (12" extended version)	6:09
15.	"The Better Part of Me" (7" single version)	5:01
16.	"From Now On" (7" single remix)	3:44
17.	"No Mercy" ("The Better Part of Me" B-side version)	3:52
Total length:		35:42

== Personnel ==
- Jaki Graham – vocals

Additional musicians

- Phillip Ingram – vocals on "I Still Run to You"

Production

- David Gamson – producer
- Derek Bramble – producer (2–4, 6)
- David Pack – producer (5)
- Kurtis Mantronik – producer (7)
- Pete Wingfield – producer (8)
- Richard James Burgess – producer (9)
- Weldon Cochren – coordinator

Design

- Andy Earl – photography
