= Soul Survivor (Beverley Knight song) =

Single by Beverley Knight and Chaka Khan

from the album 100%
- Released: 8 March 2010
- Recorded: 2009
- Genre: R&B; Soul
- Length: 4:16 (album version); 3:27 (radio edit)
- Label: Hurricane Records
- Songwriters: Beverley Knight, Guy Chambers, Chaka Khan
- Producers: Kevin Bacon & Jonathan Quarmby

Beverley Knight singles chronology
"In Your Shoes" (2009)	"Soul Survivor" (2010)	"Mama Used to Say" (2011)

"Soul Survivor" is the third single release from British singer-songwriter Beverley Knight's sixth studio album, 100%. The song is a duet with American singer-songwriter Chaka Khan. The song received a full digital download single release on 8 March 2010. There are two versions of the song, the album version and the radio edit, which halves verse one of the song.

On 10 February 2010, the radio edit of the single was added to the BBC Radio 2 playlist, entering on the B-list. On 24 February 2010, it was announced that "Soul Survivor" had climbed to the Radio 2 A-list, Knight's first single to be placed there since the single "After You" was released in 2007.

== Background and production ==
"Soul Survivor" was co-written by Knight, Guy Chambers and Chaka Khan with production by Kevin Bacon and Jonathan Quarmby. The song was originally written with Tina Turner in mind, as a testament to her longevity; the title is taken from the bridge section of the Tina Turner song "I Might Have Been Queen". However, upon recording it Knight loved it so much that she decided to keep it and record it with Chaka Khan. Knight says: "We both see ourselves as soul survivors, we have rode through the ups and downs of our musical careers, and we are both still here and loving it".

Knight also commented:

"When me and Guy first wrote this song I recorded it alone initially, but I knew there was another dimension to it – and Chaka was that dimension! She's incredible. Everyone knows there are ebbs and flows in a career in the music industry. That's what this song is about. People fall in and out of favour all the time. The thing that gets you through is the love of what you do.".

== Critical reception ==
In a review of "100%", David Quantick of the BBC stated:

And the stand-out moment, Soul Survivor, is built to resemble the Big Song from an 80s movie (so much that it even has big chunky synths and the presence of the great Chaka Khan) before working its way through most genres of soul (there’s even a great Fauxtown bridge).

== Music video ==
The music video for "Soul Survivor" premiered on Knight's YouTube page on 3 February 2010. It is a live performance video taken from the Sheffield date of her 100% UK Tour. It features Knight's backing singer Mary Pearce performing Chaka Khan's parts of the song as Khan was touring herself, alongside Lulu and Anastacia on the Here Come the Girls Tour. Pearce was featured on the Calvin Harris single "Ready for the Weekend".

== Track listings ==
The EP release of "Soul Survivor" will contain "Soul Survivor", album track "Turned to Stone" along with live tracks taken from Knight's 2009 live UK tour. A remix single of "Soul Survivor" will also be released, containing remixes from Bimbo Jones and Wyda Productions

iTunes Exclusive single EP (released 8 March 2010 – iTunes, released 15 March 2010 – other digital sites)

1. "Soul Survivor" (with Chaka Khan) (Radio Edit)
2. "Turned to Stone"
3. "Gold Chain" (live from the "100%" tour)
4. "100%" (live from the "100%" tour)
5. "Bare" (live from the "100% tour)

Remix EP (released 15 March 2010)

1. "Soul Survivor" (Bimbo Jones Radio Edit)
2. "Soul Survivor" (Bimbo Jones Extended)
3. "Soul Survivor" (Wyda Productions Radio Edit)
4. "Soul Survivor" (Wyda Productions Extended)

Note: Initial copies of the Remix EP were sold with the songs labeled incorrectly, with the remixer being incorrect as well as the version (radio edit/extended). This error has since been resolved by iTunes.

== Chart performance ==
Chart (2010)	Peak position
UK Singles Chart	183
