= Breaking Away (Jaki Graham album) =

Studio album by Jaki Graham
- Released: September 1986
- Genre: Synth-pop; disco; soul
- Length: 43:08
- Label: EMI; Parlophone
- Producer: Derek Bramble

Jaki Graham chronology
Heaven Knows (1985)	Breaking Away (1986)	From Now On (1989)

Singles from Breaking Away
- 1. "Mated" Released: November 1985; 2. "Set Me Free" Released: April 1986; 3. "Breaking Away" Released: July 1986; 4. "Step Right Up" Released: November 1986; 5. "Still in Love" Released: March 1987

Breaking Away is the second studio album by British soul singer Jaki Graham, released in September 1986 through EMI Records. The album's production was credited to British singer-songwriter Derek Bramble.

The album was re-issued on CD on 23 August 2010 by Cherry Red Records.

== Track listing ==
All tracks are written by Derek Bramble, except where noted.

Side one
No.	Title	Length
1.	"Set Me Free"	3:36
2.	"Breaking Away"	3:33
3.	"Still in Love"	5:39
4.	"Love Under Moonlight"	5:08
5.	"Let's Get Blue" (featuring Derek Bramble)	4:32

Side two
No.	Title	Writer(s)	Length
1.	"Luv 2 Much"		4:07
2.	"The Love of Your Life"	Alan Gorrie; Bramble	4:03
3.	"The Closest One" (featuring Derek Bramble)	David Grant; Bramble	4:41
4.	"Step Right Up"		3:58
5.	"Mated" (featuring David Grant)	Kasim Sulton; Roger Powell; Todd Rundgren; Willie Wilcox	3:51

Cassette edition
No.	Title	Length
1.	"Set Me Free"
2.	"Breaking Away"
3.	"Still in Love"
4.	"Love Under Moonlight"
5.	"Let's Get Blue"
6.	"Stop the World"	4:43
7.	"Luv 2 Much"
8.	"The Love of Your Life"
9.	"The Closest One"
10.	"Step Right Up"
11.	"Mated"
12.	"Love Me Tonight"	3:42
Total length:		51:33

- Sides one and two were combined as tracks 1–12 on CD reissues.

Bonus tracks (2010 Cherry Pop reissue)
No.	Title	Length
13.	"Breaking Away" (7" version)	3:04
14.	"Set Me Free" (12" extended version)	4:13
15.	"Breaking Away" (12" extended version)	5:15
16.	"Still in Love" (Lights Down - lower mix)	7:16
17.	"Luv 2 Much" (Too Much 12" mix)	5:58
Total length:		25:46

== Charts ==
Chart (1986)	Peak position
Dutch Albums (Album Top 100)	47
Swedish Albums (Sverigetopplistan)	35
UK Albums (OCC)	25
