= Ji (album) =

Studio album by Junior
- Released: April 1982
- Studio: Scorpio Sound, London; Good Earth Studios, London, RAK Studios
- Genre: Britfunk; funk; soul; dance; R&B
- Length: 40:51
- Label: Mercury
- Producer: Bob Carter

Junior chronology
| Ji (1982) | Inside Lookin' Out (1983) |

Singles from Ji
- 1. "Mama Used to Say" Released: 27 July 1981; 2. "Too Late" Released: June 1982; 3. ""I Can't Help It"/"Let Me Know" Released: 1982

Ji is the debut studio album by English singer Junior (Junior Giscombe), released in April 1982 by Mercury Records. The album was recorded with producer Bob Carter after the pair initiated their collaboration with the single "Mama Used to Say" (1981), which was remixed for Ji and became a transatlantic hit. A Britfunk record, the album mixes styles of soul and funk, with expansive synthesised production and a funk backing group. Giscombe and Carter's lyrics were based on realist stories. Music critics compared the singer's voice and melodic style to Stevie Wonder.

Upon release, the album was a commercial success, reaching number 28 in the UK Albums Chart and number 71 on the US Billboard Top LPs & Tape chart. A further single from the record, "Too Late", made the UK Top 20. The album was generally praised by music critics, with attention given to its soulful style and inventive dance rhythms. Ji was re-released in 2012 by Soul Music in a deluxe edition.

== Background and recording ==
Born and raised in Clapham South, London, Junior Giscombe left school as a fan of reggae and frequented sound systems. In this period, he was a pickpocket, but began making music as a way of moving past his crimes, forming an eleven-piece vocal group with his friends with similarly dubious operations; he explained: "I started it in the sense that I wanted to keep them off the streets, so that I wouldn't end up inside." While working as shoemaker, Giscombe would tire of the job and spend time writing songs. He moved away from the reggae scene because of what he perceived as widespread "anti-white" attitudes, and moved into soul music, taking inspiration from Philly soul writers Gene McFadden, John Whitehead, Thom Bell and Linda Creed as he turned music into a full-time career after finishing college. Wanting to form a rock-leaning R&B band, he formed the band Atlantis as an outlet for his songs. He released a solo single, "Get Up on Dance", on the American label Fireside but it was unsuccessful, and the singer soon left Atlantis due to creative differences.

Giscombe began recording solo demo tapes and sent material to Phonogram, who offered to sign him as a singer, working with writer Ken Gold of Aretha Franklin fame, but he turned the offer down as he wanted to coin his own material, feeling that although Gold was "a great writer," "there was something growing from the kids which was a bit different to what writers like himself were doing." He took note of the rise in young Britfunk bands such as Linx, Light of the World and Imagination and took inspiration to work in a similar idiom. In an interview with Chris Salewicz, he said that, unlike the previous generation of British black groups, who he felt played for a white audience, Britfunk bands like Linx and Beggar & Co "are playing music that both black and white kids can get into... We all live here, we all come from the same areas, we all know where these guys are coming from."

Phonogram remained persistent in pursuing Giscombe, and via their label Mercury Records they offered Giscombe to record a single with Bob Carter, producer of Linx. The pair wrote and recorded "Mama Used to Say," whose style Giscombe compared to a "lightweight Parliament" with "maybe a bit of Gap Band in there too, but it still has a distinctive sound, which is me." Issued as a single in the UK on 27 July 1981, it sold 10,000 copies. Following this, Phonogram sent the song over to the United States, where it was remixed, while Giscombe was touring as Linx's backing singer. This version became a much larger success there, reaching number 30 on the Billboard Hot 100 number two on the Soul charts, and number four on the disco charts. Early in the song's American success, while Giscombe and Carter were working on a follow-up single, Phonogram requested they work on an album, allowing them three weeks, which the pair spent working frantically. Giscombe spent early mornings writing lyrics and tunes which he then took to Carter's studio, where the pair would exchange ideas and develop arrangements. The singer is backed on Ji by a British funk sextet.

== Composition ==
Ji is a Britfunk album that fuses funk and soul music, applying musical versatility to the format of dance music, according to critic Geoffrey Himes. Carter's production features synthesizers, which reveal a new wave influence, and Mellotrons, as well as incorporating accents to contrast the chunky rhythm section, including "glowing bass slides, ringing guitar tones and short horn phrases." "My inspiration comes from what's happening on the street," Giscombe explained, "whereas Bob Carter comes from a middle-class white set-up. Because of that, we're able to teach one another a lot." The singer felt the album had "enough different rhythms and a distinctive sound" to make him unique. While Ji is characterised by dance beats and foreground melodies, each song features what Himes describes as "odd harmonies," counter-rhythms and variations. Bassist Keith Wilkinson reveals influences of Motown.

"I would like to be able to write music where I don't need to be stagnant, I don't need to search for the goal, get the goal and then stay on that level. I'd like to be able to pull people through change."

— Junior Giscombe, 1982

Critics compared Giscombe's singing to Stevie Wonder. Himes highlighted "Let Me Know" for this comparison, despite having a "fatter and funkier" dance beat than Wonder's music, as Giscombe's supple voice "can glide through tricky melody maps and smoothly shift from silky crooning to gruff barking." He wrote that Giscombe's distinctive vocal phrasing "breaks up ordinary lines into revealing pauses, drawn-out syllables and compressed syllables." "Mama Used to Say" and "Too Late" appear on the album remixed by Tee Scott. Journalist Barney Hoskyns compared "Love Dies" to the Jacksons, "Darling You" to Chaka Khan and the disco song "Let Me Know" to "1969-period" Wonder, while describing "Down Down" and "I Can't Help It" as dance ballads.

Giscombe said most of the songs, which incorporate themes of realism, are based on real-life situations; "Too Late (Junior)" was inspired about a woman Giscombe met in Scotland who told him of the assumption that only Scottish men mistreat their wives. He said: "I thought to myself how ironic that is. It's very true. It happens in every race, it happens with everybody and that's what 'Too Late' is all about. I like writing like that, trying to fantasise on a situation and putting it into much more real circumstances than you get with ordinary soul." "Mama Used to Say" was inspired by an 18-year-old Giscombe dated when he was 22. He pretended he was 20 to "make it more feasible for me and her to go out," which inspired him to think about "things that my mother would say to me about rushing to get old, getting to 16 and wanting to get to 25 and when you look back you’ve killed 10 years of your life rushing to get to this particular age." The album also features themes of romance. "I Can't Help It" features a guest appearance from David Grant on backing vocals.

== Release and promotion ==
By the release of Ji, the success of "Mama Used to Stay" in the US afforded Giscombe stardom there, and became the first British singer to appear on Soul Train since David Bowie. While pleased with his US breakthrough, he was disappointed with his relative lack of success in England, especially given the successes of Linx and Imagination, nonetheless hoping that second single "Too Late" would "be easier for the kids to latch onto at home." Released by Mercury Records in May 1982, Ji proved to be a transatlantic commercial success. The album reached number 28 on the UK Albums Chart, spending fourteen weeks in total, while "Mama Used to Say" eventually peaked at number seven on the UK Singles Chart in June. The album also peaked at number 71 on the Billboard Top LPs & Tape chart, staying on the chart for sixteen weeks. "Too Late" peaked at number 20 in the UK in July, while a double A-side of "I Can't Help It" and "Let Me Know" reached number 53 in September. In the US, "Too Late" reached number eight on the soul charts and number 67 on the disco charts. According to Junior's biography on Pizza Express Live, the Ji album reportedly sold upwards of 10 million copies. "Mama Used to Say" was a transatlantic hit and the follow up single "Too Late" was a worldwide hit, firmly cementing Junior on the world stage.

== Critical reception and legacy ==
Professional ratings
Review scores
| Source | Rating |
|---|---|
| AllMusic | 4/5 stars |
| Record Collector | 3/5 stars |
| Smash Hits | 6/10 |
| The Village Voice | B+ |
| The Virgin Encyclopedia of R&B and Soul Music | 3/5 stars |

In a contemporary review, Ian Birch of Smash Hits described Ji as "a delicious mix of well meaning words, ferocious dance rhythms and soaring vocals," further praising it for its "ideal summer sound," while Newsweek described the album as "one of the year's brightest recording debuts" on which the "splendid cacophony" of "Mama Used to Say" is the highlight. In The Washington Post, Geoffrey Himes praised the "British funkster" for matching Stevie Wonder's "intoxicating melodic gift", hailing the warmth and "credibility" of Giscombe's singing for equalling the ambitions of the music and concluding that Ji ranks with Prince's Controversy and Wonder's Hotter Than July as "the most progressive soul albums of this young decade."

Robert Christgau of The Village Voice said that while Giscombe, a "Stevie Wonder surrogate", is clearly England's "most impressive recent export," Ji forgoes the effervescence and spaciousness of Wonder's lyrics, with only the two hits showing "the gift for the ordinary bewitching." While praising several songs, particularly "Mama Used to Say," Barney Hoskyns of NME felt Giscombe's lyrics were largely ineffective, and panned Carter's production for "coating Ji in a patina of muso varnish that does ill credit to its few stirring chunes." He however felt that "patient investigation" was required as Giscombe was a newcomer. In another NME article, Paolo Hewitt hailed Ji as "a varied collection of great songs" and "probably the best testament yet to the so-called British funk movement." Billboard editor Leo Sacks named Ji his third favourite album of 1982, while Enrique Fernandez named it his fifth favourite.

In a retrospective review, Alex Henderson of AllMusic named Ji an "Album Pick" and highlighted "the charismatic Junior" as a major British R&B talent who showed "considerable promise" on the album, which "remains his most essential release." Soul Music re-released the album in 2012, adding bonus material including the non-album single "Fame" and alternate versions of the album's songs. In a review of the reissue, Kris Needs of Record Collector described Ji as a "Brit-soul landmark", writing that Giscombe's lyrics and "soulful delivery" elevated the songs from their "early 80s synth sheen coating," and describing the exploration of domestic violence in "Too Late" as bold for its time, concluding that the reissue is "a worthwhile document of a time when UK soul came of age."

== Track listing ==
All tracks written by Junior Giscombe and Bob Carter, except where noted

=== Side one ===
1. "Mama Used to Say" – 6:38
2. "Love Dies" (Giscombe) – 4:25
3. "Too Late" – 4:49
4. "Is This Love" (Carter) – 4:29

=== Side two ===
5. "Let Me Know" – 5:47
6. "Down Down" – 4:41
7. "I Can't Help It" – 4:24
8. "Darling You (Don't You Know)" – 5:34

== Personnel ==
Adapted from the liner notes to Ji

- Junior Giscombe – vocals, arrangement, writing
- Bob Carter – keyboards, backing vocals, producer, arrangement, writing
- Andy Duncan – drums and percussion
- Keith Wilkinson – bass
- Guy Barker – trumpet, flugelhorn
- Chris Hunter – alto saxophone, tenor saxophone
- A.T. Wimshurst – guitar
- Steve Parker – engineering (Scorpio Studios)
- Chris Porter – engineering (Good Earth Studios)
- Phil Thornalley – engineering (RAK Studios)
- Tee Scott – remixing ("Mama Used to Say" and "Too Late")
- Vera Haime – backing vocals ("Is This Love")
- David Grant – backing vocals ("I Can't Help It")

== Charts ==
=== Weekly charts ===
| Chart (1982) | Peak position |
|---|---|
| UK Albums (OCC) | 28 |
| US Billboard 200 | 71 |
| US Top R&B/Hip-Hop Albums (Billboard) | 15 |

=== Year-end charts ===
| Chart (1982) | Position |
|---|---|
| US Top R&B/Hip-Hop Albums (Billboard) | 45 |
