= 100% (Beverley Knight album) =

Studio album by Beverley Knight
- Released: 7 September 2009
- Genre: R&B; Soul
- Length: 50:46
- Label: Hurricane
- Producer: Bobby Ross Avila; Issiah "IV" Avila; Kevin Bacon; Jimmy Jam and Terry Lewis; DC Joseph; DJ Munro; Jonathan Quarmby; The Rural

Beverley Knight chronology
The Collection (2009)	100% (2009)	Soul UK (2011)

Singles from 100%
- 1. "Every Step" Released: 6 July 2009; 2. "Beautiful Night" Released: 7 September 2009; 3. "In Your Shoes" Released: 9 November 2009; 4. "Soul Survivor" Released: 8 March 2010

100% is the sixth studio album by English singer-songwriter Beverley Knight. It was released on 7 September 2009 through Knight's own record label Hurricane Records, following her departure from Parlophone. The lead single from the album, "Beautiful Night" was released as a download-only on the same day as the album. A radio only first single, "Every Step", produced by Jimmy Jam and Terry Lewis was added to BBC Radio 2's B-list on 17 June 2009. It was released as a free download on 6 July 2009 for two weeks. A remix album, titled 100% – The Remixes was released exclusively on digital download via Beatport on 29 January 2012. It features remixes of three of the 100% album singles, "Beautiful Night", "In Your Shoes" and "Soul Survivor".

== Background and production ==
After the release of her 2007 album Music City Soul, Knight's record contract with Parlophone had come to its natural end. Knight decided she was at the stage in her career where she needed to take full creative control and no longer wished to be tied down by the constraints of her record company. In an interview with Ronnie Herel on BBC 1Xtra on 26 May 2009, Knight revealed that the album would be titled 100%. She further explained that throughout her entire career, she felt that she had given 100% of her effort whether it be recording albums, performing live or through her philanthropic work. Knight went on to say that she considered the title a dedication to her partner and that for the first time she had given 100% to a relationship. This is further illustrated by the title track "100%" which she dedicated to partner James.

100% features guest appearance from singer Chaka Khan on the track "Soul Survivor," which was co-written by Knight and Guy Chambers. Originally written for Tina Turner as a testament to her longevity, upon recording it Beverley loved it so much that she decided to keep it and recorded it with Khan. Knight commented that they "both see ourselves as soul survivors, we have rode through the ups and downs of our musical careers, and we are both still here and loving it". Other notable collaborators on the album include Jimmy Hogarth, Guy Chambers, Amanda Ghost, Jimmy Jam and Terry Lewis, The Rural, DJ Munro and DC Joseph, and Kevin Bacon and Jonathan Quarmby.

== Critical reception ==
Professional ratings
Review scores
Source	Rating
Allmusic	3.5/5 stars
BBC	favourable
Digital Spy	3/5 stars
The Mirror	4/5 stars

100% received generally positive reviews from music critics. Allmusic editor Jon O'Brien found that the album "appears to have jumped on the ubiquitous '80s revival bandwagon [echoing] the classy soul balladry of Anita Baker, the synth-heavy funk of Alexander O'Neal, and the acid-jazz leanings of early Brand New Heavies. It's a change in direction which, unlike her recent output, feels like a natural progression, its authentic groove-fueled production, thankfully free of Auto-Tune, allowing Knight's effortlessly smooth and expressive vocals to shine." In his review for BBC, critic David Quantick commented that "the title track, which is a full on Anita Baker croon tune, is predicated not on a lot of timbales sprinkling about over some nice chords, but an ambient ripple running under it like Brian Eno leaving his bath taps running."

Mayer Nassim from Digital Spy remarked that "the deep soul of the title track is the best thing here, evoking the likes of Bobby Womack with its classic dynamics that perfectly match Knight's impressive vocals. 'Bare' is another highlight, a stripped down Whitney-esque torch ballad that frames what is still one of the best voices in British music." A mixed review came from Andy Welch of The Telegraph who wrote that "at once vintage-Atlantic-soul-sounding yet defiantly British, her nickname as the UK's Queen of Soul couldn't be more apt. Despite this, she's never really had the material her vocal talent should have. On this, her sixth studio album, nothing has changed." However, Serena Kutchinsky of The London Paper rated 100% two stars while commenting that "yes, Knight has a syrupy smooth voice which is used to full effect on tracks such as 'Beautiful Night,' but the dearth of catchy pop hooks and too much schmaltzy gospel render of it little more than pseudo-soulful tripe."

== Track listing ==
100% – Standard edition
No.	Title	Writer(s)	Producer(s)	Length
1.	"Beautiful Night"	Knight; Amanda Ghost; Ian Dench; James Dring; Jody Street	The Rural	4:12
2.	"Breakout"	Knight; DJ Munro; Dex Nicholson	DJ Munro; DC Joseph	3:30
3.	"In Your Shoes"	Knight; Munro; Nicholson; Edwyn Collins	DJ Munro; DC Joseph	3:07
4.	"100%"	Knight; Guy Chambers	Kevin Bacon; Jonathan Quarmby	4:04
5.	"Every Step"	Knight; James Harris III; Terry Lewis; Bobby Ross Avila; Issiah J. Avila; J. Najera; Cedric Perrier	Jimmy Jam & Terry Lewis; The Avila Brothers	4:45
6.	"Soul Survivor" (with Chaka Khan)	Knight; Chambers; Khan	Bacon; Quarmby	4:16
7.	"Turned to Stone"	Knight; Jimmy Hogarth	Bacon; Quarmby	4:22
8.	"Bare"	Knight; Jamie Hartman	Bacon; Quarmby	3:17
9.	"Square Peg"	Knight; Paul Simm	The Rural	4:42
10.	"Gold Chain"	Knight; Ghost; Dench; Dring; Street	The Rural	3:21
11.	"Moneyback"	Knight; Munro; Nicholson	DJ Munro; DC Joseph	3:19
12.	"Painted Pony"	Knight; Craig Wiseman	The Rural	3:26
13.	"Too Much Heaven"	Barry Gibb; Maurice Gibb; Robin Gibb	Bacon; Quarmby	4:47
Total length:				50:46

Amazon bonus track
No.	Title	Length
14.	"A Love We'll Never Know"	3:35
Total length:		54:21

Play.com bonus track
No.	Title	Length
14.	"Force of Nature"	4:10
Total length:		54:56

iTunes deluxe edition bonus tracks
No.	Title	Length
14.	"In Your Shoes" (Live)	3:23
15.	"Piece of My Heart" (Live)	4:28
16.	"Beautiful Night" (Video)	3:19
17.	"Behind the Scenes of Beautiful Night" (Video)	2:33
Total length:		64:29

100% – The Remixes
No.	Title	Length
1.	"Beautiful Knight" (Crazy Cousins Club Mix Edit)	3:09
2.	"Beautiful Knight" (Crazy Cousins Funky Mix)	3:53
3.	"Beautiful Knight" (Crazy Cousins Club Mix)	4:14
4.	"In Your Shoes" (Sammy Jay Remix)	3:56
5.	"Soul Survivor" (Wyda Productions Radio Mix)	3:23
6.	"Soul Survivor" (Wyda Productions Extended Mix)	5:22
7.	"Soul Survivor" (Bimbo Jones Vocal Mix)	8:12
8.	"Soul Survivor" (Bimbo Jones Radio Mix)	3:35
Total length:		35:44

== Charts ==
Chart (2009)	Peak position
Scottish Albums (OCC)	29
UK Albums (OCC)	17
UK Independent Albums (OCC)	2
UK R&B Albums (OCC)	2
