= In Your Shoes =

Single by Beverley Knight featuring Chipmunk

from the album 100%
- Released: 9 November 2009
- Recorded: 2008
- Genre: R&B; Soul
- Length: 2:46 (radio edit); 3:07 (album version)
- Label: Hurricane Records
- Songwriters: Beverley Knight, DJ Munro, Dex Nicholson, Edwyn Collins
- Producers: DJ Munro, DC Joseph.

Beverley Knight singles chronology
"Beautiful Night" (2009)	"In Your Shoes" (2009)	"Soul Survivor" (2010)

Chipmunk singles chronology
"I Got Soul" (2009)	"In Your Shoes" (2009)	"Look for Me" (2009)

"In Your Shoes" is the second single release from British singer-songwriter Beverley Knight's sixth studio album, 100%, released on 9 November 2009. The radio edit was added to the BBC Radio 2 playlist on 14 October 2009 and peaked on the B-list.

== Background and production ==
The song was co-written by Knight, DJ Munro, Dex Nicholson and Edwyn Collins and was produced by DJ Munro, and DC Joseph. "In Your Shoes" takes a sample from Scottish post-punk band Orange Juice's 1983 release of "Rip It Up". For the single release of "In Your Shoes", a remix was created for urban radio stations featuring British rapper Chipmunk performing over the original middle-eight section of the song. The remix version was premiered on Ronnie Herel's BBC Radio 1Xtra programme. Knight explains that "In Your Shoes" is about people who focus their envy of your progress, instead of concentrating on their own journey".

== Critical reception ==
In an early review of "100%", David Quantick of the BBC said of the song "Knight's fifth album sees the singer rip it up and start again. Literally so in the case of the splendid, must-be-a-single In Your Shoes, which doesn't so much sample Orange Juice's Rip It Up as sit on it and ride it to the market".

== Music video ==
The music video uses the remix version of the song and features cameos from Nate James, Booty Luv, Michael Underwood, Angelica Bell, Chipmunk and co-writer DJ Munro. The music video is a Top of the Pops spoof set in 1986 which reflects the retro style of the song.

== Track listings ==
iTunes Digital Download

1. "In Your Shoes" (radio edit) – 2:46
2. "In Your Shoes" (featuring Chipmunk) – 2:52
3. "In Your Shoes" (radio edit – instrumental) – 2:39

Amazon/Play/7Digital Digital download

1. "In Your Shoes" (radio edit) – 2:46
2. "In Your Shoes" (radio edit – instrumental) – 2:39

iTunes Remix Digital Download single (released 22 November 2009)

1. "In Your Shoes" (Sammy J remix) – 3:46

Other versions

1. "In Your Shoes" (album version) – 3:07
2. "In Your Shoes" (live) – 3:23

== Charts ==
"In Your Shoes" failed to chart on both the UK Singles Chart and the UK R&B Singles Chart.
