= Too Late (Junior Giscombe song) =

Single by Junior Giscombe

from the album Ji
- Released: 1982
- Recorded: 1981
- Genre: Soul; R&B; synthpop; funk
- Label: Mercury
- Songwriters: Junior Giscombe, Bob Carter
- Producer: Bob Carter

Junior Giscombe singles chronology
"Mama Used to Say" (1981)	"Too Late" (1982)	"I Can't Help It/Let Me Know" (1982)

Music video
- "Too Late" on YouTube

"Too Late" is a song by English soul singer Junior Giscombe, released in 1982 as the follow-up to his breakthrough single from July 1981, "Mama Used to Say". The lyrics were written by Giscombe. The song was inspired by a woman Giscombe met in Scotland.” who told him of the assumption that only Scottish men mistreat their wives. He said: "I thought to myself how ironic that is. It's very true. It happens in every race, it happens with everybody and that's what 'Too Late' is all about. I like writing like that, trying to fantasise on a situation and putting it into much more real circumstances than you get with ordinary soul."

The single reached number 8 on Hot Black Singles, number 20 on the UK Singles Chart, number 67 on Disco Top 80, and 29 on the Irish singles chart. The record was released by Mercury Records. Giscombe was also inspired by Rick James, and he mentions how it took him just a couple of minutes to write Too Late. Giscombe also talks about how important "Too Late" was as it established his fanbase which led to a long term presence in the American market.

== Critical reception ==
AllMusic's Alex Henderson described "Too Late" as melancholy and referred to Junior Giscombe as a promising soulster in his review of the Ji album. in a separate AllMusic biography, Ed Hogan noted that "Too Late" was a number 8 R&B smash. In a retrospective review for Record Collector, Kris Needs praised Junior Giscombe's Ji as a significant moment in UK soul, stating that despite the "early 80s synth sheen," the "quality of Junior’s writing and Giscombe's soulful delivery" made tracks like "Too Late," stand out he referred Too Late as "a then-bold look at domestic violence."

== Track listings ==
7" single
No.	Title	Length
1.	"Too Late"	3:56
2.	"Too Late (Instrumental)"	3:58
Total length:		7:54

12" single
No.	Title	Length
1.	"Too Late"	7:08
2.	"Too Late (Instrumental)"	4:05
Total length:		11:13

== Personnel ==
- Junior Giscombe - lead vocals, songwriter
- Bob Carter - songwriter, producer
- Tee Scott - remixer

== Charts ==
Chart (1982)	Peak position
UK Singles (OCC)	20
Hot Black Singles (Billboard)	8
Disco Top 80 (Billboard)	67
Irish Singles	29

== Other uses ==
- Rapper KRS-One sampled the song's vocals in his song "Hip-Hop vs. Rap".
- Hip hop group Brand Nubian sampled the song for their track of the same name on their 1998 album Foundation.
- Rappers MC Hammer and Tupac Shakur sampled the song for their 1996 single "Too Late Playa" featuring Big Daddy Kane, Danny Boy and Nutt-So, intended for Hammer's still-unreleased album Too Tight during his short tenure at Death Row Records.
