= Jaki Graham =

British singer-songwriter (born 1956)

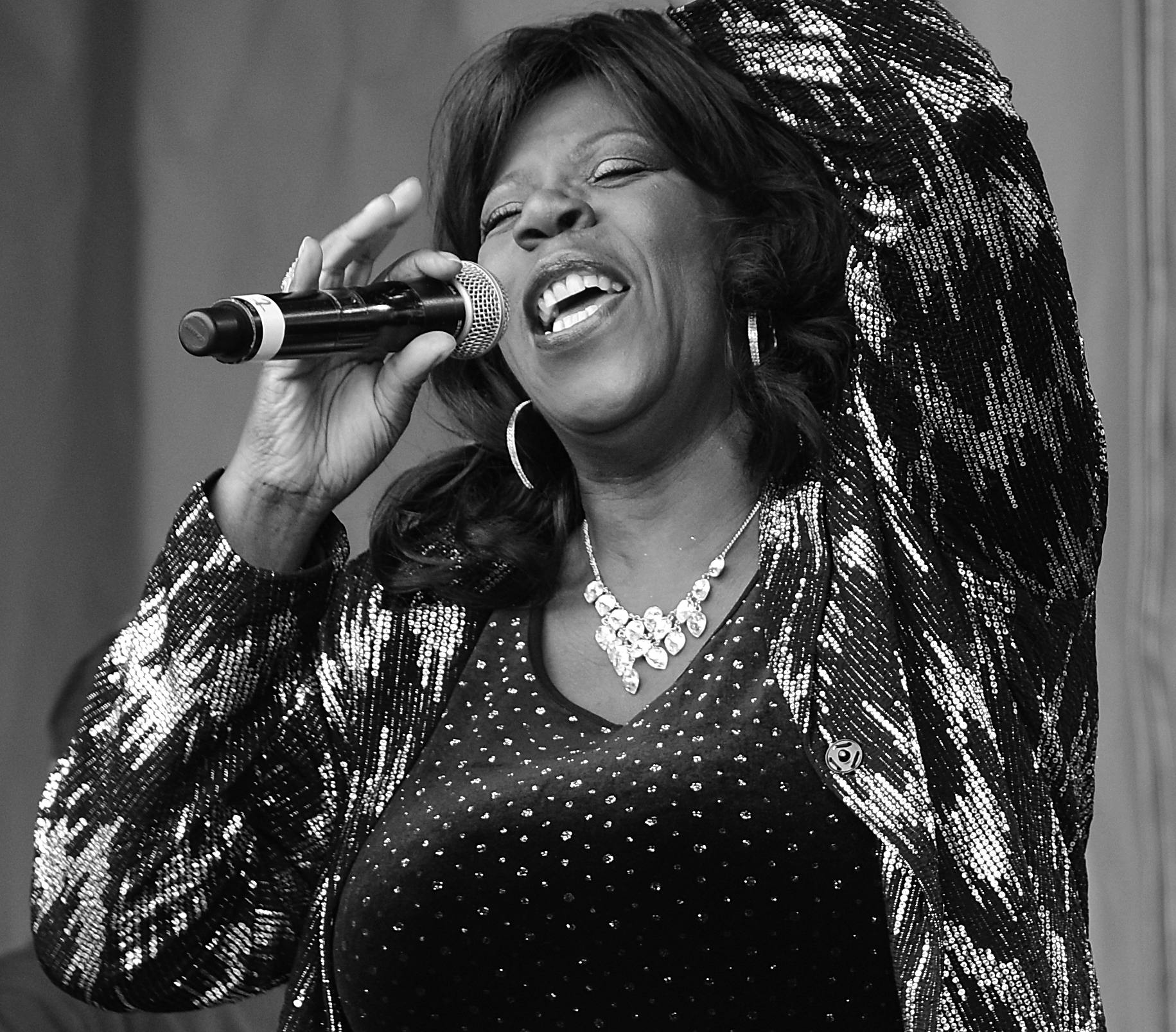
- Graham performing live at Let's Rock Liverpool, 31 July 2021

Background information
- Born: Jacqueline Graham; 15 September 1956 (age 69); Birmingham, England
- Genres: R&B; dance-pop; British soul; house; pop
- Occupations: Singer; songwriter; record producer
- Instrument: Vocals
- Years active: 1977–present
- Labels: EMI; Avex International; JNT Music Ltd

Jacqueline Graham (born 15 September 1956) is a British singer-songwriter. Following her hit version of "Could It Be I'm Falling in Love" with David Grant in 1985, Graham scored a further five UK top 20 hits over a two-year period. In 1994, her cover version of Chaka Khan's hit "Ain't Nobody" reached number one on the US Billboard Dance Club Songs.

== Biography ==
=== EMI years ===
Graham was born in Birmingham to Jamaican parents. In 1983 after recording a session for a jazz funk band called Medium Wave Band, Graham was spotted by a talent scout and signed to EMI Records. Two solo singles were released in the following year, "Heaven Knows" (the title of her first album) and "Once More with the Feeling".

The duet with David Grant, a cover version of the Detroit Spinners track "Could It Be I'm Falling in Love", was released in early 1985 reaching no. 5 in March of that year. Graham's fourth solo single "Round and Around" saw her return to the UK top 10 a few months later. A second duet with Grant was released to end the year, entitled "Mated". This peaked at no. 20.

Graham's single "Set Me Free" was released in early 1986 and reached no. 7 in the UK, also seeing the success repeated throughout Europe. "Breaking Away" was released in August as the follow-up single, reaching no. 14 in the UK charts. Graham's second album of the same name was also released. Later in 1986 her hit "Step Right Up" was remixed and released, also making the UK top 20.

During this time, American singer Michael McDonald was looking for a female singer to accompany him on the track "On My Own" (originally recorded with Patti LaBelle) for his next UK tour. After hearing Graham's voice, McDonald was quoted as saying "Jaki is one of the best singers Britain has ever produced". McDonald later wrote for Graham's albums and has featured her as a special guest on his UK tours.

In 1989, she released her third and final album recorded on the EMI label called From Now On. The album included two singles: the title track and ballad "The Better Part of Me", both of which failed to reach the UK top 40.

=== Later years ===
In 1991, Graham joined with Paul Hardcastle in the group Kiss the Sky. Their self-titled album was released that year on Motown Records. In 1993, Graham was spotted by AVEX International, Japan, whilst at the Midem music conference and was immediately signed to the label. Work started in 1994 on her album Real Life. Three singles were released internationally from the album, "You Can Count on Me (For Love)", "Absolute E-Sensual" and the song that would be Graham's biggest international single to date, "Ain't Nobody". "Ain't Nobody" entered the charts in Europe, Asia, Australia and reached no. 1 in the US Billboard Dance Club Songs chart for five weeks.

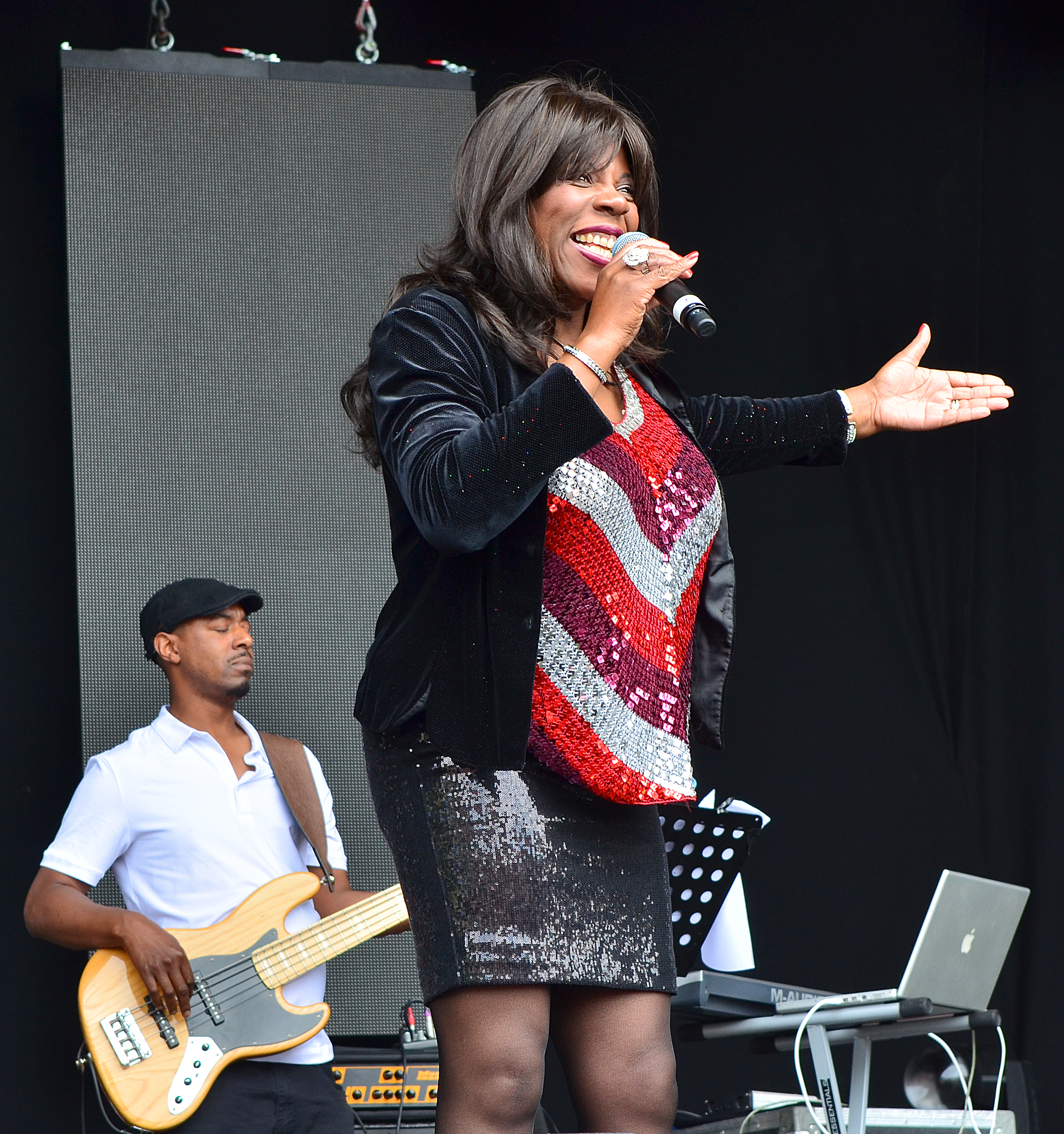
Graham performing live in Bristol, UK in June 2014.

In October 2009, Graham performed at the Birmingham Town Hall with the BBC Big Band to perform specially arranged versions of George Gershwin classics. Both the concert and the transmission that followed later on BBC Radio 2 received high critical acclaim and within a few weeks of the transmission, Graham was invited back, this time to perform Duke Ellington classics in March 2010.

In August 2010, almost 24 years to the date of its original release, Breaking Away – Special Edition was put out on CD across the UK and Ireland via Cherry Pop. In addition to the 12 songs that were included in the original album, an additional five bonus tracks, three of which were exclusive to the CD, were added.

During 2010, Graham accompanied McDonald and Al Green on their UK 'Legends' Arena Tour which included Birmingham LG, Manchester MEN and London's O2 Arena, as McDonald's special guest. Later in 2010, Demon Music released Absolute Essential – The Very Best of Jaki Graham. This would be Graham's first 'official' 'greatest hits' album and included 28 songs over two CDs.

During 2011, Graham was invited to join Cliff Richard on his 'Soulicious' Arena Tour in October. This was his only British special guest alongside James Ingram, Percy Sledge, Freda Payne, Lamont Dozier and Marilyn McCoo and Billy Davis Jr. of the 5th Dimension. The event was filmed across two nights at London's O2 Arena and issued as a DVD.

In early 2012, she entered a small recording studio in Leeds, and along with her band, would record her new album entitled For Sentimental Reasons. Graham returned to the recording studio in Leeds to add some additional backing vocals, and the album was complete. The mixing of the album took place in early August and was released in October 2012. In the same year, Graham collaborated with UK music producer Paul Rudd to re-release a new version of 'Set Me Free 2012'. It was recorded with new vocals at Britannia Row Studios in London.

In 2016, Graham presented a radio programme, Soul on Sunday, on BBC Radio London. In 2018, Graham released a new studio album, When a Woman Loves, on her own label, JNT Music Ltd.

== Personal life ==
Graham has been married to Tony Ormsby since 1976. They have a daughter Natalie (born 1981) and a son Ryan (born 1993).

== Awards ==
In early October 2012, Graham was honoured with a star on Birmingham Walk of Stars on Broad Street. A show took place in the evening that month where she performed some of her hits, as well as a selection of songs from For Sentimental Reasons.

In 2015, Graham was awarded an honorary degree from the University of Wolverhampton in recognition of her services to the music industry.

== Discography ==
=== Albums ===
==== Studio albums ====
Year	Title	UK	Certifications
1985	Heaven Knows	48	
1986	Breaking Away	25	BPI: Silver
1989	From Now On	—	
1994	Real Life	—	
1995	Hold On	—	
1996	Rhythm of Life	—	
1997	Don't Keep Me Waiting	―	
1998	My Life	―	
2012	For Sentimental Reasons	―	
2018	When a Woman Loves	―	
"—" denotes releases that did not chart.

==== Compilation albums ====
Year	Title
1995	Best Shots
2009	Greatest Hits Live!
2010	Absolute Essential – The Very Best of Jaki Graham
2021	35th Anniversary Collection (4-CD set)

=== Singles ===
Title	Year	Peak chart positions										Album
Title	Year	UK	AUS	GER	IRE	NL	NZ	SWE	SWI	US Dance	US R&B	Album
"What's the Name of Your Game"	1984	113	—	—	—	—	—	—	—	—	—	Heaven Knows
"Heaven Knows (Feels So Good)"	1984	59	—	—	—	—	—	—	—	—	—	Heaven Knows
"Once More with the Feeling"	1984	150	—	—	—	—	—	—	—	—	—	Heaven Knows
"Could It Be I'm Falling in Love" (duet with David Grant)	1985	5	—	—	8	17	48	—	—	—	60	Heaven Knows
"Round and Around"	1985	9	—	23	14	—	—	—	—	—	85	Heaven Knows
"Mated" (duet with David Grant)	1985	20	—	—	23	17	—	—	—	—	—	Breaking Away
"Set Me Free"	1986	7	—	47	21	18	—	16	11	15	—	Breaking Away
"Breaking Away"	1986	16	—	—	14	22	—	—	—	—	—	Breaking Away
"Step Right Up"	1986	15	—	—	13	42	—	20	—	—	—	Breaking Away
"Still in Love"	1987	83	—	—	—	—	—	—	—	—	—	Breaking Away
"No More Tears"	1988	60	—	—	—	—	—	—	—	—	—	Breaking Away
"From Now On"	1989	73	—	—	—	—	—	—	—	—	88	From Now On
"The Better Part of Me"	1989	79	—	—	—	—	—	—	—	—	—	From Now On
"Every Little Bit Hurts"	1989	—	—	—	—	—	—	—	—	—	79	From Now On
"Touch Me (When We're Dancing)"	1991	87	—	—	—	—	—	—	—	—	—	non-album singles
"Band of Gold"	1992	109	—	—	—	—	—	—	—	—	—	non-album singles
"Ain't Nobody"	1994	44	17	—	—	—	—	—	—	1	—	Real Life
"You Can Count on Me"	1995	62	129	—	—	—	—	—	—	—	—	Real Life
"Absolute E-Sensual"	1995	69	54	—	—	—	—	—	—	3	—	Real Life
"When a Woman Loves"	2018	—	—	—	—	—	—	—	—	—	—	When a Woman Loves
"—" denotes single that did not chart or was not released.

== See also ==
- List of artists who reached number one on the U.S. Dance Club Songs chart
- List of Billboard number-one dance club songs
- List of number-one dance singles of 1994 (U.S.)
- List of performers on Top of the Pops
