= Omar Lye-Fook =

British singer, songwriter and actor (born 1968)

Omar Lye-Fook MBE
- Born: Omar Lye-Fook; 14 October 1968 (age 57); London, England
- Occupations: Singer; songwriter; musician; actor
- Years active: 1985–present
- Musical career
- Genres: Soul; neo soul
- Instruments: Vocals; keyboards; bass guitar; drums; guitar
- Labels: Kongo; Talkin' Loud; RCA; Naïve; Blunt Music; Freestyle Records

Omar Christopher Lye-Fook (born 14 October 1968), known professionally as Omar, is an English singer, songwriter and actor. He grew up in Canterbury, Kent, and learned his craft classically, playing the trumpet, piano and percussion. He also spent two years at Chetham's School of Music in Manchester and the Guildhall School of Music in London. His most well-known song is his debut single "There's Nothing Like This". It reached number 14 on the UK singles chart on re-release in 1991. In 2022, he appeared in EastEnders as Avery Baker.

== Career ==
Following his first two single releases, "Mr Postman" (1985) and "You and Me" (1988) featuring backing vocals from Caron Wheeler, Omar released his debut album, There's Nothing Like This, in 1990. Initially released on his father's record label, Kongo Records, it entered the UK Albums Chart, peaking at No. 54. Signing to his first major record label Talkin' Loud, his debut album was re-released, and climbed to No. 19 on the UK Albums Chart. This was followed in 1992 by his second album, Music, which proved less successful than the first, peaking at No. 37. A new signing to RCA Records led to Omar undertaking collaborations with other musicians, including Lamont Dozier, David Frank (the System), former Heatwave bassist Derrick Bramble, Leon Ware, Syreeta and Stevie Wonder. In 1996, Omar contributed "Water to Drink" to the AIDS benefit album, Red Hot + Rio, produced by the Red Hot Organization.

In 2003, after one of his songs ("There's Nothing Like This") was used in the intro round on Never Mind the Buzzcocks, presenter Mark Lamarr questioned Omar's supposed instant recognisability, quipping that he would require a Blockbuster card to confirm Omar's identity. Omar's agent e-mailed the show, and, a few episodes later, Omar appeared in the show's 'identity parade' round, Blockbuster card in hand. Lamarr was forced to concede that Omar was both immediately recognisable, and a rather more significant artist than he had earlier given him credit for. In 2006, the Urban Music Awards presented Omar with the Best Neo Soul Act and Outstanding Achievement Awards.

After studying at the Identity Drama School, on 11 June 2009, Omar made his acting debut in Ché Walker's musical Been So Long. He was appointed Member of the Order of the British Empire (MBE) in the 2012 Birthday Honours for services to music. During July and August 2015, Omar appeared as part of the house band in the BBC Two comedy series The Javone Prince Show. In June 2017, Omar was one of the "Artists for Grenfell" who performed the number-one charity single "Bridge over Troubled Water", in aid of victims of the Grenfell Tower fire.

In January 2022, Omar contributed vocals to Berlin-based artist Le Commandant Couche-Tôt's track "L'été indien". In 2022, Omar was cast in the role of Avery Baker in the BBC soap opera EastEnders.

== Personal life ==
Omar is sometimes credited as Omar Hammer. His birth father's surname is Lye-Fook, while his stepfather's surname is Hammer. Omar became the father of twin daughters in early 2008, Carmen and Gabrielle.

== Discography ==
=== Albums ===
Year	Title	UK
1990	There's Nothing Like This	19
1992	Music (re-issue)	17
1994	For Pleasure	50
1997	This Is Not a Love Song	50
2001	Best By Far	—
2006	Sing (If You Want It)	—
2013	The Man	—
2017	Love in Beats	—
2017	Black Notes from the Deep (Courtney Pine)	—
2025	Brighter the Days	—

=== Singles ===
Year	Title	UK	Label
1991	"There's Nothing Like This"	14	Kongo Records
1992	"Your Loss My Gain"	47	Talkin' Loud
1992	"Music"	53	Talkin' Loud
1994	"Outside" / "Saturday"	43	RCA
1994	"Keep Steppin'"	57	RCA
1997	"Say Nothin'"	29	RCA
1997	"Golden Brown"	37	RCA
2023	"Happy Feelings" (collaboration with Ana Tijoux and Stuart Zender)	—	UIM Music
2025	"Nights Like This" (with Donae'o, Lemar and the House Gospel Choir)		
