= Porchester Hall =

Grade II* listed building in Bayswater, London

Coordinates: 51°31′02″N 0°11′21″W

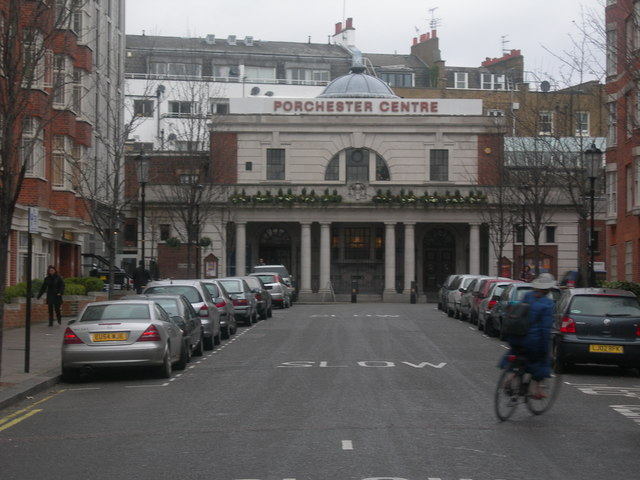
Porchester Centre, 2006

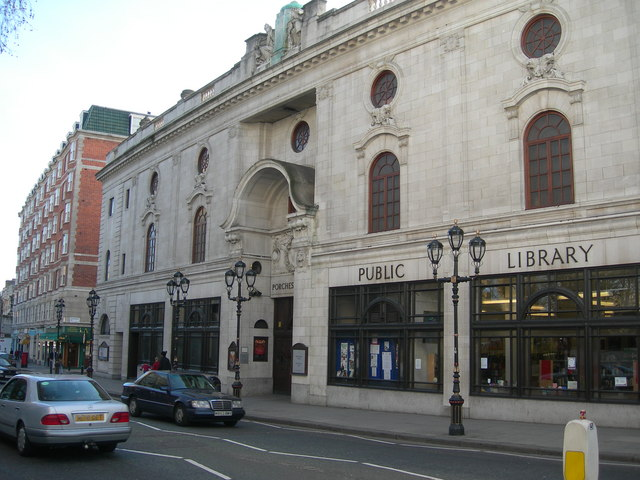
Paddington Library, Porchester Hall, 2007

The Porchester Centre is a Grade II* listed building at the junction of Queensway and Porchester Road in Bayswater, London W2.

== History ==
It was built in 1923–25 by the local architect Herbert Shepherd, and was originally called Porchester Hall.

In 1927–29, it was extended by Shepherd and H. A. Thomerson, adding Victorian-style Turkish baths, a library and assembly rooms.

English Heritage note that, "The Turkish baths complex is now exceptionally rare, and is thought to be the best surviving example, whilst the hall is an unusually rich example of its date."

== Performance venue ==
Several notable pop music acts have performed there, including Ed Sheeran, The Feeling, Arcade Fire, Cat Stevens, Snow Patrol, Hawkwind, Above & Beyond, Texas, The Who, Pink Floyd, Van Morrison, Kylie Minogue, Amy Winehouse and Beverley Knight. The "Mr. Creosote" sketch from Monty Python's The Meaning of Life was filmed here in summer 1982.

During the 1960s, 1970s and 1980s the venue was home to the annual Porchester Hall Drag Balls.
