= True (Spandau Ballet song) =

1983 single by Spandau Ballet

- Artwork for vinyl releases

Single by Spandau Ballet

from the album True
- B-side: "Lifeline" (remix); "Gently" (US)
- Released: 15 April 1983
- Recorded: October–December 1982
- Studio: Compass Point (Nassau, Bahamas); Red Bus (London)
- Genre: Blue-eyed soul; new wave; sophisti-pop
- Length: 5:39 (single version); 6:29 (album/12-inch version); 6:08 (The Twelve Inch Mixes version); 5:17 (music video version); 4:58 (promo 45 edit)
- Label: Chrysalis; Reformation
- Songwriter: Gary Kemp
- Producers: Tony Swain; Steve Jolley; Spandau Ballet

Spandau Ballet singles chronology
"Communication" (1983)	"True" (1983)	"Gold" (1983)

Music video
- "True" on YouTube

"True" is a song by the English new wave band Spandau Ballet, released in April 1983 as the title track and third single from their third studio album. It was written by the band's lead guitarist and principal songwriter Gary Kemp to express his feelings for Altered Images lead singer Clare Grogan. Kemp was influenced musically by Marvin Gaye and Al Green songs he was listening to at the time, and lyrically by Green and the Beatles. "True" reached number one on the UK singles chart in April 1983 and made the top 10 in several other countries, including the US, where it became their first song to reach the Billboard Hot 100.

Kemp wanted to shift the sound of Spandau Ballet into soul and incorporated band member Steve Norman's newfound interest in the saxophone into his writing; the band also updated its look to include wearing suits for the song's music video and tour. "True" was recorded with most of the other tracks from the album at Compass Point Studios in the Bahamas. The True album was released as its second single, "Communication", was climbing the UK Singles Chart. DJs were so enthusiastic about playing the title song that the band knew it would be their next single.

The song has since become the band's signature hit. It has been covered by Paul Anka in a swing style, and used in films such as Sixteen Candles and 50 First Dates, as well as TV series such as Modern Family. Other artists have sampled it in their own hits, including P.M. Dawn, who went to number one in the US with "Set Adrift on Memory Bliss" in 1991.

== Background and writing ==
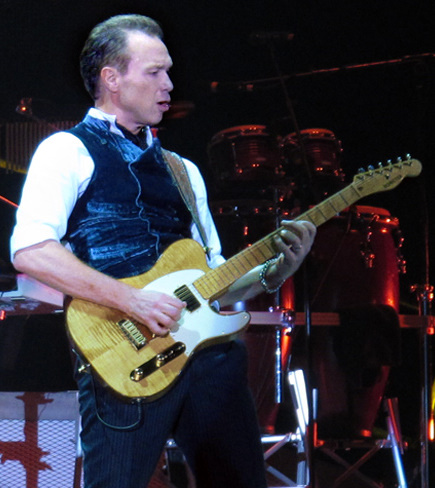
Gary Kemp wrote the song.

In 1981, Spandau Ballet guitarist/songwriter Gary Kemp met Altered Images lead singer Clare Grogan and felt an "instant connection" in part due to their conversations about writers. For his birthday that year, she gave him a copy of the novel Lolita by Vladimir Nabokov, whom they had discussed. He intended the relationship to be platonic since he already had a girlfriend, but he was also competing for her attention with two other men: actor John Gordon Sinclair, who starred with her in Gregory's Girl, and artist David Band, who had designed cover art for Altered Images; he would later do so for Spandau Ballet with the single "Communication".

Spandau Ballet's first album, Journeys to Glory, was released in 1981. It reflected their desire to represent the clientele of the trendy London nightclub the Blitz with its focus on what Kemp called "white European disco music". Their second album, Diamond, had a successful stab at funk with its lead single, "Chant No. 1 (I Don't Need This Pressure On)", but otherwise disappointed critics with its more experimental material. The poor chart performance of its next two singles, "Paint Me Down" and "She Loved Like Diamond", resulted in a remix of its more pop-sounding track "Instinction", which became a number 10 hit on the UK Singles Chart in spring 1982. That rebound brought a stark realisation for Kemp: the nightclub crowd Spandau Ballet originally catered to was no longer interested in them. (Note: "At the end of the second album there was a feeling, you know, there were some of the kids we were hanging out with at the time who were going, 'We can't follow these guys anymore. They've been on Top of the Pops six times.' It's not really cult, is it?")

Kemp told John Wilson in a Mastertapes interview in 2013 that, because they were unable to keep the audience they initially attracted, "[t]here was a sense of, '[w]e have to move on from here,'" a desire to expand to a broader audience. This later inspired the "True" lyric "I bought a ticket to the world". He suddenly felt free to compose pop music without concern for its danceability, (Note: "And I sort of realized that I didn't have to keep chasing 'What's the latest rhythm that I need to write to? What sound are all my friends wanting to dance to in that club?'") which allowed him to focus more on the melody. He told Creem magazine in 1984, "For the first time, I was trying to write songs that were emotional release for me—me just writing about myself and the way I felt."

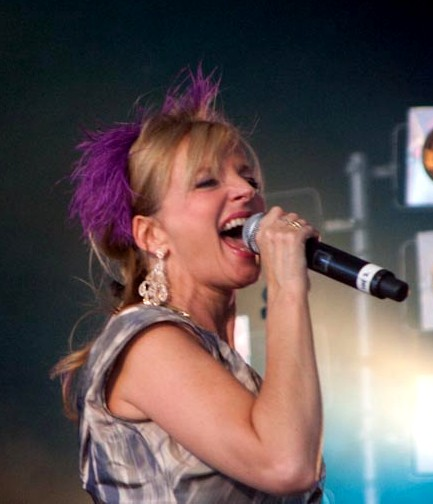
Clare Grogan (pictured in 2009) of Altered Images inspired the lyrics of "True".

Kemp was primarily listening to soul artists Marvin Gaye and Al Green as he developed songs for the band's next album. (Note: "As I wrote, there were two big influences. The first was Marvin Gaye and Al Green—two artists I played most often on my turntable.") His love of their music factored heavily into writing the title track, even to the point of paying tribute to Gaye on a first-name basis:

The bit that goes "Listening to Marvin all night long" was a reference to me and Steve Norman, the band's saxophonist. We were massive soul boys: we loved … The Face magazine and all that glossy stuff, so this was us taking an anti-rock stance. The inky press loved blues and reggae because they were about suffering. They didn't like soul because it was aspirational, all about dancing, wearing great clothes and having sex. They saw it as vacuous. So namechecking Marvin Gaye was a defiant statement aligning us with the London soul boy culture stretching back to mod. And I'd loved Mott the Hoople singing about T. Rex in "All the Young Dudes" so was pleased to reference another artist in a song.

Kemp wanted to write a blue-eyed soul version of what Gaye and Green performed, (Note: "I think I wanted to write a song that was a bit like a Marvin Gaye, Al Green song, a blue-eyed soul song.") something "with that kind of vulnerability and atmosphere of uncertainty", with music like Green's "Let's Stay Together" (Note: "Musically, I wanted to write something like Al Green's 'Let's Stay Together' with its line: 'I'm, I'm so in love with you.' But it came out as: 'Huh huh uh-huh huh.'") and lyrics from his own experience, (Note: "You're sitting at home, and there's the music in your head, and I say, That's the song I want to write. So then you use it as a springboard to go into your truth, you know.") particularly with regard to his feelings for Grogan. (Note: "The second inspiration came from outside. When Spandau Ballet had appeared… in '81 with Altered Images, I met their lead singer, Clare Grogan. She and I had an instant connection.") (Note: "And it was about writing. Why do I find it so hard to write the next line, you know, when I really wanna tell you what I'm thinking but I'm not being too cryptic? And actually then I thought, well, I'll put it all in the song.") Kemp began the music for what became "True" in mid-1982 after watching the 1970 Beatles documentary Let It Be on television; afterwards the song "Dig a Pony" stuck in his head. In a 2017 interview with The Wall Street Journal, he described how the song opens: "John Lennon sings 'I, hi-hi, hi-hi, I dig a pony.' I loved how he took that one word—'I'—and turned it into a snaking melody." Kemp took to his Eko acoustic guitar that evening wanting to avoid the dance rhythms he was used to writing and instead structured a melody around the word "I" the way Lennon had. He reworked the opening line from Green's hit, "I'm, I'm so in love with you", as "Ah ha-hah hahh-hi / I know this / much is / true-oo."

"'True' is about how difficult it is to be honest when you're trying to write a love song to someone", Kemp later admitted. "Hence: 'Why do I find it hard to write the next line?'" In his 2009 autobiography I Know This Much: From Soho to Spandau, he explained that even conveying his feelings in lyrics he "felt inhibited, shy even, so I started to write about that very thing: the fear of revealing oneself, of saying in song what was true." Of the infatuation that he was uncomfortable confessing, he later told The Daily Telegraph, "I didn't want to write it down—because there's nothing more embarrassing."

After reworking Green's opening line, Kemp decided the song would not focus so much upon what he knew was true regarding the subject as it would on the issue of how much of the truth he was going to tell. (Note: "I jotted down, 'I know this much is true.' Then I asked myself, 'What do I know that's true?' Instead of answering the question, I decided the song would be about how much I was going to tell you about the truth.") He wanted to use the song as a way to tell Grogan how he felt (Note: "The lyrics are full of coded messages to Clare.") by choosing phrases no one else would understand (Note: "So maybe I was writing about this person who inspired me to write the song. I definitely didn’t want you to know who it was. But I figured I'd leave a couple of messages in there.") and looked through the copy of Lolita she had given him. He found the underlined phrases "pill on my tongue" and "seaside limbs", (Note: "The book was on my night table. Stuck for lines, I flipped through the pages and noticed I had underlined the phrases 'pill on my tongue' and 'seaside limbs'.") the latter of which he modified for the lyric "Take your seaside arms and write the next line / Oh, I want the truth to be known." (Note: "'Seaside limbs' inspired my lines, 'Take your seaside arms and write the next line / Oh, I want the truth to be known.'") Parsing the other selection, he thought, "'A pill dissolves, doesn't it? And the pill was trying to dissolve the nerves that I have, because I'm nervous when I'm with you or thinking about you'". He wrote the lyric "With a thrill in my head and a pill on my tongue / Dissolve the nerves that have just begun." After he had finished writing the song, he felt it was more about the process of creating something "with a blue-eyed soul feel" than it was about Grogan. (Note: "By the end, the song's lyrics weren't about Clare but simply a way to write a song with a blue-eyed soul feel.") (Note: Kemp first disclosed that Grogan was the subject of the song in his 2009 autobiography, and he told The Wall Street Journal in 2017 that they had not discussed it in any of their encounters since.)

Spandau Ballet had already released two albums and several singles, but Kemp and his brother, Martin, the band's bassist, were still living with their parents. Once finished with "True", Kemp sang and played it on his guitar for Martin, who liked it and thought it was ready to record. (Note: "Days later, when I had the words and music together, I called in my brother, Martin, from his bedroom next door. Martin plays bass in the band. I played what I had. He was pleased and thought it was ready.") When Gary performed it for the rest of the band, he was accompanied by an old friend from his years at Dame Alice Owen's School, pianist Jess Bailey. Kemp had discovered a Rhodes Chroma keyboard that gave him the sound he wanted, and Bailey adapted Gary's guitar chords so that he could play more than just single notes on the new polyphonic synthesiser.

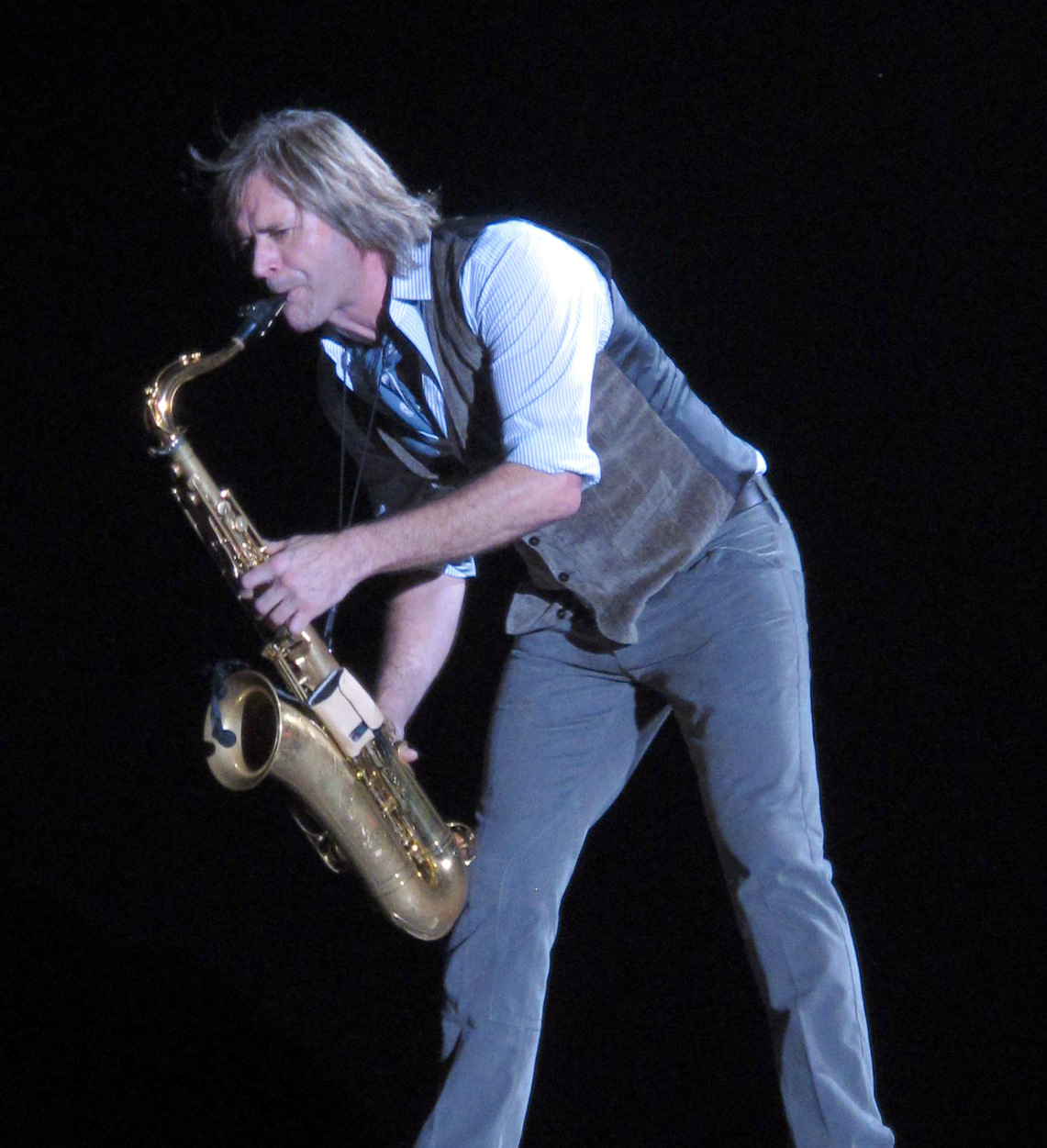
Gary Kemp wanted Steve Norman's saxophone to become "the sound" of the True album.

Kemp wrote in his autobiography that "by far the slickest musician in the band" was Steve Norman, who had played guitar on Journeys to Glory but switched to percussion instruments on Diamond. They enlisted the help of Beggar & Co as the horn section on that album for tracks such as "Chant No. 1", which inspired Norman to take up the saxophone. Kemp called it "another voice within the band" and that he "would purposely write to elevate his saxophone into its own space" by changing keys, "and that just steps it out of the track and puts it somewhere else."

Kemp wrote "True" in the key of G major with a tempo of 98 BPM and a chord progression of G, Em9, CMaj9, Bm7. The song modulates to the key of E♭ major for the sax solo, after which it returns to G Major. Norman told The Guardian in 2012 that his solo combined two takes; at the time the band began working on "True", he had been regularly listening to the Grover Washington Jr.–Bill Withers hit "Just the Two of Us", explaining, "The solo is a reply to that: at the key change things just lift off, giving the song a moment of elation." The interest in the saxophone went beyond "True" for Kemp, who recalled how, as teenagers, he and Norman had appreciated its use on hits by Smokey Robinson and Stevie Wonder and, specifically, on Evelyn "Champagne" King's "Shame". He thought the instrument epitomized soul music and should be prominently featured on the new album.

== Recording ==
The band wanted to record at Compass Point Studios in the Bahamas because of the soul music that had been recorded there; Kemp also felt that the tropical surroundings would help give the music the feeling he was trying to achieve. (Note: "Talking Heads were there at the same time, sitting in the shade on the other side of the pool, while we wore shorts and flip-flops and roasted in the sun. It added to the groove.") They also decided to get assistance in producing what would be True from Tony Swain and Steve Jolley, who had recently worked with Bananarama and Imagination. The band appreciated the use of the synth-bass on the latter's hit single "Body Talk" so much that they had Swain play the instrument on the recording of "True" instead of having Martin Kemp play electric bass. (Note: "When we got around to 'True,' we decided that instead of Martin playing the electric bass, Tony [Swain] would play the synth-bass keyboard.") In describing how the change lent itself to the new sound they were after, Kemp insisted, "Martin didn't mind. We all loved the synth bass's sound. It was of its time and had a disco, funk-soul feel. We were trying to rebrand ourselves in a slightly different direction."

The backing vocals for the song were recorded using a Dolby noise-reduction system, but the band decided not to use the decoder that would remove the hissing from the recording because they liked the sound of the "airy, breathy fizz on top". The result gave Kemp a sense of the success they would be enjoying: "When we listened to the playback in the studio, everyone suddenly started singing along, the road crew and everything. I think we knew then it was a number 1."

Tony Hadley's lead vocal was recorded with Steve Jolley producing at Red Bus Studios in Paddington after returning from Nassau. In his 2004 autobiography To Cut a Long Story Short, Hadley wrote, "It's quite a complicated song to sing in terms of phrasing and timing, and we soldiered on for ages before we felt we'd got it right." When asked in a 2017 Professor of Rock interview about the high note he reaches while singing, "Oh, I want the truth to be said," at the point between the sax solo and the final chorus, he responded, "I don't do that big note at the end now. I just play it down." The plan was to open the song with just a string synthesizer, (Note: "Originally, we planned to open the song with Jess playing a string synthesizer, but the sound of strings alone wasn't enough.") but Swain was unhappy with how it sounded and came up with the idea of using the chorus for the beginning without the lead. Kemp attributed the album version's six-and-a-half-minute length to their love for the finished product with the lead vocal finally included. (Note: "After Tony Hadley recorded his emotional lead vocal, we loved the final result so much we let the album version run 6 1/2 minutes. We didn't want it to stop.")

== Cover art ==
Kemp asked artist David Band to work with Spandau Ballet on the design for the new album. Because they were both seeing their careers take off during their attempts to court Grogan, they went camping together a few times in the English Lake District as a way of escaping their success. Kemp recalled, "We first started to devise a cover together for the True album when we were up in the mountains, in one of the pubs one evening. He was drawing in his sketchbook and a dove appeared, this little dove." Band later added alongside it the outline of a man's head with a brimmed hat, which the band loved; a variation was used for the sleeve of the "True" single. His work was described as "a marker for the look of the time, a jazz-influenced style that could also be seen in an exaggerated fashion in the New Romantic look." Kemp credits him with having "the skill of coming up with simple, figurative graphics that would set a visual tone for the decade." In 2012 he told The Herald:

I felt David was tuning into something visually and graphically that was in the air anyway. But he was the first to do that. David set the tone for a certain look. A lot of people picked up on it. He was creating something new that was inspiring everyone.

Kemp was unaware of some of the fun poked at the song: "Our friendly in-house press girl, Julia Marcus, even told us that she and a friend had boldly graffitied the toilet at Camden Palace with the Spandau dove and the word True." In his autobiography Pop Stars in My Pantry: A Memoir of Pop Mags and Clubbing in the 1980s, her friend, music journalist Paul Simper, recounted that the text written under the dove actually read, "This Much Is Poo".

== Release and commercial performance ==
When the True album was completed, the band's label, Chrysalis Records, was pleased with the results and felt it would succeed on the strength of "Gold" and the title song. The first single, "Lifeline", had been recorded at Red Bus in August 1982 and released on 24 September. It peaked at number 7 on the UK Singles Chart and made its last appearance there at the end of November. The album was completed the following month, but Kemp explained that when the next single needed to be chosen, the band's manager, Steve Dagger, "didn't want to go with a ballad next and recommended another up-tempo first. 'Communication' got the band vote. Why we didn’t go straight for 'True' or 'Gold' as the next single, I'm not sure. Maybe we felt their success would be automatic and wanted to save them for later, during the album's release."

"True" was released in early February 1983, with the album following in the UK a month later, debuting on the UK Albums Chart on 12 March, the same week "Communication" peaked at number 12. Kemp felt the success of "Communication" was hampered by the fact that "radio DJs were all playing the album track 'True' instead". Hadley recalled one instance in which Simon Bates of BBC Radio 1, having just played the album version of "True" on the air before it became a single and predicting to his listeners that it would go to number one when it did, played it again immediately. (Note: "[B]ut it was Simon Bates, and he played 'True', and he said, 'If this is not a number one song, blah, blah, blah, and, you know what? I'm gonna play it again.'") For Kemp, the decision had been made for them: "By public demand, 'True' would be our next single."

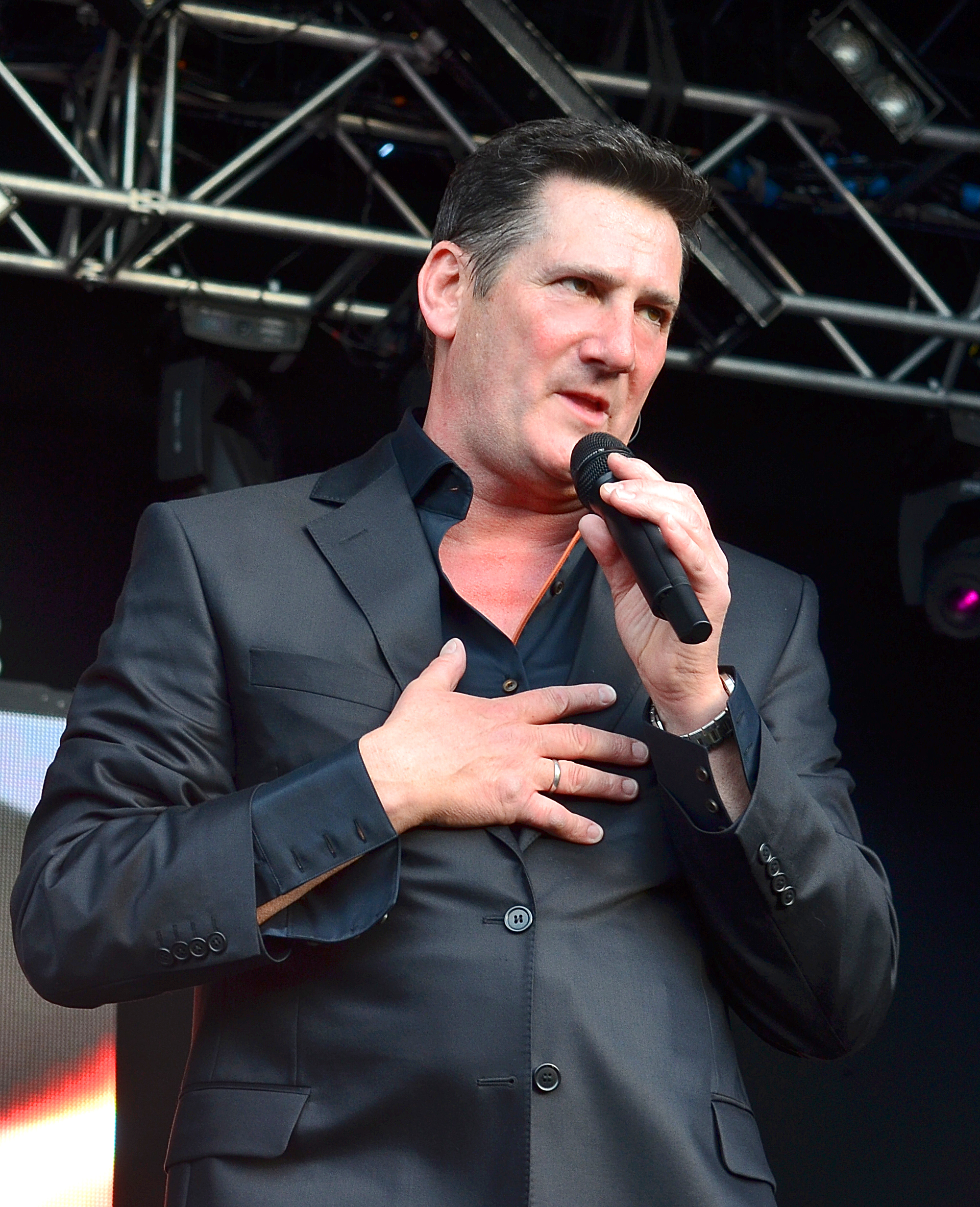
Tony Hadley went from being sceptical of the song's potential to seeing how its sudden popularity made topping the UK pop chart inevitable.

Norman thought the band had a "friendly rivalry" with Duran Duran: "In the studio, we used to leave each other insulting messages, jokes and caricatures." But after "True" was released in mid-April 1983, Duran Duran left Spandau Ballet a message saying they thought the song was "fantastic". Despite Kemp's feeling in the Bahamas that it would be a hit, Hadley thought it would never even be released as a single. In 2014, he said he did not think it their best song—he preferred 1986's "Through the Barricades"—and that he was still confused by lyrics such as "Head over heels when toe to toe", concluding, "But then, I suppose, we grew up on David Bowie and Roxy Music. 'Virginia Plain'—what's that about? Half of the Bowie songs, I couldn't tell you what they're about. With 'True', you have to create the imagery for yourself." In his autobiography, he wrote, "No one was more surprised than me when it went on to become our biggest hit".

The day before Spandau Ballet learned that "True" had reached number one on the UK Singles Chart at the end of April, they had heard that the single had sold over 60,000 copies in one day and that their closest competitors had only sold one-third of that. They were on tour in Sheffield when Dagger heard the announcement of their chart feat, so he called their hotel to give them the news. Kemp spoke to him, excitedly woke drummer John Keeble, with whom he shared a hotel room, to spread the news, and snuck into Hadley's room to spray him awake with champagne. Remembering Keeble riding a room-service trolley down the hotel corridor in celebration, Hadley said they "were all in high spirits" but that the rambunctious activities seemed "slightly flat" in light of their recent success. His surprise at the song's selection as a single had given way to certainty that it would top the charts: "It had such momentum the overwhelming feeling was, how can this not be a number 1?"

Once "True" had finished its third week as the most popular song in the UK, another goal came into view: the British music chart television programme Top of the Pops would be celebrating its thousandth episode the next week, so a fourth week at number one would mean that their performance of "True" would close out the show. The success of "(Keep Feeling) Fascination" by the Human League seemed like it might prevent that.

Their record sales were sailing neck and neck with ours, but so confident was Richard Branson, owner of the League's label Virgin, that he'd decided to throw a lavish post-show party at the Kensington Roof Gardens in honour of the history and importance of Top of the Pops; but of course, him being a publicity-loving beast, it would also elevate his own band's achievement. Tickets and invites were sent out, but come the Tuesday morning, Spandau Ballet were still residing at the top of the charts. The next day we went in and recorded the special edition, playing around a huge birthday cake. That night, poor Richard had to suffer the indignity of the entire Chrysalis company … as well as us, turning up to gloat and guzzle the Branson champagne.

Dagger met with Danny Glass, the head of radio promotion at Chrysalis New York, to discuss distributing the song to stations in the US, and Glass proposed starting with those focused on the Black market so that the fact that the band were all white would initially go unnoticed. Adult contemporary and pop stations would be next on the list. But the first chart the song appeared on in Billboard magazine was the Hot 100, the US equivalent of the UK Singles Chart. "True" debuted there at the beginning of August and peaked at number 4 during its 18 weeks there. Later in the month it debuted on the magazine's Adult Contemporary chart, where it spent 22 weeks, one of them at number 1. Its eight-week run on the magazine's list of the most popular Black Singles in the US began at the end of the month and included a peak position of 76, and the mid-October edition marked the start of four weeks on the Top Tracks rock chart, where it reached number 34.

With the royalties from "True", I was finally able to move out of my parents' house.

— Gary Kemp

In addition to its 4 weeks at number 1 on the UK Singles Chart "True" also reached the top spot on the pop charts in Canada and Ireland and made the top 10 in several other countries. (Note: "True" reached number 3 in Spain, number 4 in Australia, the Netherlands and New Zealand, number 5 in Switzerland and number 9 in Belgium and West Germany.) It received Gold certification from the British Phonographic Industry in May 1983 for shipping a half-million units and came in at number 6 on the list of the UK's best-selling songs that year. In 2011, it received a BMI award as one of the most played songs in US history, with 4 million airplays. It received Platinum certification from BPI for 600,000 units on 22 July 2022.

A new mix by Tony Swain and Gary Kemp was released in 2002 on the compilation album Reformation. In April 2008, the single celebrated its 25th anniversary, and in honour of the occasion, EMI released a brand new True EP including the original single, the Reformation remix, and the remastered album version, plus live recordings of "True" and "Gold" from the last show of the group's 1983 tour at Sadler's Wells Theatre.

== Critical reception ==
When Betty Page reviewed the True album for Record Mirror, she wrote, "Kemp proves himself a softie beyond all doubt with final track 'True', a smoochy 'I am just a poor boy' epic, hand firmly on heart." Her colleague at the magazine, Daniela Soave, was less ambiguous in her review of the single, calling it a "genuine pearl of a song that deserves to be at number one" and summarizing, "Suffice to say 'True' makes you melt. Sentimental but not slushy, warm but not stifling, Spandau Ballet have hit the nail well and truly on the head and got it absolutely right."

Spandau Ballet - "True"
Steve Norman's saxophone was thought of as "another voice within the band" and his solo was described as "melodic".

A few of the retrospective reviews were complimentary. In 2009, Tim Rice wrote in The Spectator that the song was "a giant of its time and remains a standard today". In 2015, Peter Larsen wrote for The Orange County Register that the band's formula of mining "a vein of soulfulness tinged with nostalgia and romance" had "reached perfection" on the track, describing it as "the one Spandau Ballet song everyone knows ... It's truly a perfect song, as moving today as ever it was." Ian Gittins of The Guardian gave it as an example of the band's "slick, chart-friendly shoulder-heaving soul", calling "True" a "juggernaut power ballad". Stewart Mason of AllMusic mixed in negative comments in an otherwise positive review:

Tony Hadley's tendency towards vocal histrionics is kept in check here, except for the elongated fade-out where his familiar keening is finally let loose; for the first three or four minutes, however, he delivers the most nuanced and emotional performance of his career. Similarly, Steve Norman's saxophone is finally, for almost the only time in the band's entire career, put to good use on his melodic and well-placed solo. "True" is complete chart fodder, of course, but it's really, really good chart fodder.

Some critics showed complete disdain for the song, including different writers for The Guardian. In dismissing Spandau Ballet as "Thatcherism on vinyl", Michael Hann described "True" as "dreadful wine-bar soul". Luke Williams referred to the song as "the biggest load of musical tosh ever", while mocking the lyric 'Why do I find it hard to write the next line?' In The Rolling Stone Album Guide, Paul Evans complained that "Kemp, with 'Gold' and 'True', provided Hadley perfect songs for hamming it up: lush MOR that would've been clever if it had been intended ironically."

== Music video and tour fashion ==
When Spandau Ballet were filmed for the "Lifeline" music video, Kemp acknowledged that the clothes they wore were "drab" and that the shift to pop left them "caught in a moment of not knowing what to wear". With an upcoming tour of Europe they felt they needed to update their style and met with an old friend from Soho, Chris Sullivan, for guidance since they felt out of touch with the latest trends. They wanted uniformity and decided on suits since no one else was wearing them at the time. Sullivan presented them with sketches of his ideas, and Kemp described the look they settled on and its lasting impact on their image: "He'd come up with the idea of the gambling gunslinger, a sort of Wyatt Earp meets City Boy; five Wild West-enders. And in good cowboy fashion, it was to brand us forever."

The band wore a variation of this look for the "True" video and had only their instruments with them on an otherwise bare soundstage. The original video incorporated a series of scenes filmed in black and white involving a young man (played by Gary Shail) who evolves from anguish as he roams city streets to jubilation as he is joined by animation renderings of the man and the dove from the album cover. Dominic Anciano did the animation, which the band did not like and decided not to use. (Note: "Dominic Anciano did some animation for the 'True' video, a disastrous stickman that soon found himself, courtesy of the band, lying on the cutting room floor.") When Kemp spoke to Creem magazine in 1984, he summarized the version that only showed the band, saying, "I didn't want to dictate what [the video] should be like. I'm sure when people hear that record they've got their own idea of what it means and what it looks like. So we just performed it and lit it well—shooting light through water and broken glass—and it worked." Although Kemp is not credited with playing piano on the song, he is shown doing so in the video, and brother Martin is shown playing guitar even though he had been replaced by Swain on the synth-bass for the studio recording.

"True" was listed on MTV's reports to Billboard indicating what videos were in rotation on the cable network, making its first appearance there in the 9 July 1983 issue, which indicated that it had been added to their playlist as of 29 June.

== Aftermath ==
"Gold", the next single released from the True album, entered the UK Singles Chart in August 1983 to begin a nine-week run, reaching number 2. But while it also made the top 10 on the pop charts in several countries (Note: "Gold" reached number 2 in the Netherlands, number 3 in Belgium, number 4 in Ireland and Spain, number 8 in New Zealand and number 9 in Australia.) its number 29 showing in the US was the first signal to Kemp that Chrysalis America was not promoting them. "Communication" only reached number 59 in the US in 1984, and "Only When You Leave", the first single from their next album, Parade, became their last Hot 100 entry when it peaked at number 34 later that year. Kemp was unhappy with their performances as well and blamed the low numbers on a perceived conflict between Chrysalis founders Chris Wright and Terry Ellis distracting them from promotional efforts. Wright refused to license the band to a bigger label in the US, so they sought legal advice to get out of their contract. The disappointing chart performance in the US led Spandau Ballet to leave Chrysalis for CBS Records, which released their Parade follow-up, Through the Barricades, in 1986.

The problem, I think, with America is that you didn't have the pre-history, if you like. You didn't have "To Cut a Long Story Short", "Chant No. 1", except on a kind of club, cult-y level … on the coasts. So in mainstream America the first thing they saw were five really smart-looking young guys who every mother loved ... they didn't get the gritty bit before, so [the success of 'True' there] was a blessing and it was a curse.

— Tony Hadley

Hadley felt that the band's inability to sustain the interest of the American public resulted from a few other factors working against them, primarily that their big US hit was very different to what they had already succeeded with elsewhere. Kemp had said in an interview before "Gold"'s US release that he hoped it would give Americans a more balanced view of Spandau Ballet. (Note: "I'm glad 'Gold' is going to do well over here; it's shaking off the enigma of (the song) 'True'. It's selling us as a band. The thing that worried us about America is people didn't know Spandau Ballet, they knew 'True'. 'True' is a much stronger song if they know where it's coming from.") Although some American concert attendees knew their old songs, he hoped their upcoming US tour would show the rest who came that "True" was not the sort of song they normally did. (Note: "Spandau Ballet's history is important so people know what the band are. Certain people in America do; we've noticed on tour the back catalog are quite well known by a lot of the audience. People who only know Spandau Ballet for the soft focus image on 'True' ... well, we wanted to come over and show ourselves with all our hard edges, transport our history over to America.")

In retrospect, however, Hadley felt they needed to spend several months touring the US so that more audiences could hear that back catalogue and not doing so also hurt their record sales there. (Note: "The fact was, we had proved ourselves capable of balancing a ballad like 'True' with electro-pop and funk, but we couldn't quite get the U.S. market to understand that. We needed to spend months touring, letting them hear the whole repertoire, but we never did.") They played "True" at the 1985 Live Aid concert, but instead of using their brief time on stage to showcase one of their earlier hits, Dagger wanted them to play "Virgin" from their upcoming Through the Barricades album, which even Kemp admitted was not a good idea. Hadley felt Dagger was inexperienced, but whenever he suggested getting a manager with more knowledge about the business, the rest of the band balked.

Kemp told Creem in 1984 that he would continue to write for the larger audience Spandau Ballet had acquired with "True" but it would not be making albums that sounded like the last just because it did well. (Note: "If I can, I'll be writing songs that appeal to that amount of people. Doesn't mean to say I'm going to stick to an equation now, 'cause we never have. The next album won't sound like True just because True sold so well.") But, just as he had developed writer's block in 1981 after "Chant No. 1" became their highest-charting single, having a UK number 1 put pressure on Kemp to churn out more chart-topping hits and left him feeling that the band would always judge his future output against "True". When the Through the Barricades album and its singles failed to chart in the US, Kemp chided himself for exploring so many genres and not simply trying to write more hit songs that were imitations of "True".

== Legacy ==
In 1984 writer-director John Hughes featured Spandau Ballet's recording of "True" in the school dance scene in Sixteen Candles, and his selection elicited responses decades later. In 2009 LA Weekly's Art Tavana noted that when it was used in that particular moment, the song "crossed over into the permanent teenage scrapbook". Also in 2009 Todd Martens of the Los Angeles Times described the emotion created by playing the song over the scene as "Totally crazy this-is-the-end-of-the-world heartache". Julian Kimble of the Washington City Paper wrote in 2014 that its inclusion "made Spandau Ballet's imprint on popular culture permanent" and that the song "adopted new significance, especially among suburban teens".

The 2009 episode of Modern Family titled "Great Expectations" featured Edward Norton playing fictional Spandau Ballet bassist Izzy LaFontaine and beginning a performance of the song, which is then followed by part of the original recording.

"Set Adrift on Memory Bliss" by P.M. Dawn, a duo of brothers Jarrett and Attrell Cordes, prominently sampled "True" and went to number 1 on the Billboard Hot 100 in November 1991. They had heard "True" in the studio where they were working on their debut album, and Attrell, known on stage as Prince Be, thought it was "so beautiful". He said, "I wanted Prince Be's version. I basically reincarnated the spirit of 'True' for me. I reshaped it as if I wrote it myself." Kemp received a writing credit with Prince Be for "Set Adrift on Memory Bliss", and Hadley appeared briefly in the music video. The duo's hit also went to number 1 on New Zealand's pop chart and made the top 10 in several countries. (Note: "Set Adrift on Memory Bliss" made the top 10 in Australia, Austria, Canada, Denmark, Germany, Greece, Ireland, Italy, the Netherlands, Sweden, Switzerland and the UK.) Kemp also received songwriting credit when "True" was sampled on the 2007 hit "You" by Lloyd that featured Lil Wayne and peaked at number 9 on the Hot 100. The Professor of Rock surprised Hadley in the 2017 interview by pointing out that the Backstreet Boys' "I Want It That Way" lifts the piano section at the end of "True"'s sax solo for the melody line of its chorus.

In 2015, "True" was voted by the British public as the nation's 10th-favourite 1980s number 1 in an ITV poll; NPR characterised it as a "karaoke staple". Other surveys were not favourable: Billboard selected "True" as one of the "Most Overplayed Songs in Movies", NME included the line "I bought a ticket to the world but now I've come back again" in their list of the "50 worst pop lyrics of all time", and it also made the Houston Press's list of "10 Songs We Never, Ever Want to Hear Again, Ever". Sean Daly of the St. Petersburg Times named "True" the worst song of all time, while Seattle Post-Intelligencer columnist Robert Jamieson selected it as the worst ever love song.

Kemp did find one famous fan: "I remember when I did The Bodyguard, Kevin Costner said to me, 'You know, that song belongs to me and my wife.' And I thought, wow, I thought it belonged to my plumber and his wife… Anyway, it didn't keep [the Costners] together, did it?"

== Covers and samples ==
will.i.am and Fergie of the American pop-rap act Black Eyed Peas covered "True" for the 2004 Adam Sandler–Drew Barrymore film 50 First Dates. Matthew Sheby of Soundtrack.net liked their hip-hop version, and Spence D of IGN thought it was a "pretty true rendition". American indie rock singer-songwriter Cary Brothers recorded it for the 2005 superhero comedy film Sky High and received differing opinions. Soundtrack.Net's Brian McVickar thought it was "certainly a winner among this [soundtrack] collection", while Heather Phares of AllMusic only found it "blandly pleasant".

Canadian-born American singer Paul Anka released a version of the song in 2005 on his album Rock Swings, with most critics noting that his cover was one of the better songs included. Michael Fremer of Analog Planet speculated that the arrangement was inspired by "Li'l Darlin'" and felt that it "gives the melancholic song a sophisticated lilt, over which Anka sells the lyrics with a powerful, assertive reading. If you didn't know the original, you'd think the tune was originally written for big band treatment." Jazz Times's Christopher Loudon wrote, "When Rock Swings is good, it’s very good – most notably on introspective ballads like Spandau Ballet's 'True'." John Kappes of The Plain Dealer explained, "Some of the material works as well as you might think; Spandau Ballet's 'True' was, after all, an easy-listening track waiting to happen from the start." The Village Voice's Franklin Bruno, however, felt that the album's "several attempts to negotiate impressionistic lyrics (Spandau Ballet's 'True,' Billy Idol's 'Eyes Without a Face') as though they possessed narrative content are comically misguided." Upon confessing that he had heard the Anka version, Hadley chuckled, "It was a bit strange," and admitted to performing the song with a swing orchestra. He could only concede, "It kind of works. It's very unusual. I think when people wanna hear me sing it, they wanna hear me sing the straight version."

"True", by CYRIL and Kita Alexander from the EP From Down Under, was released in 2024 and interpolates "True"'s chorus.

== Formats and track listings ==
- UK 7-inch single
1. "True" – 5:40
2. "Lifeline (edited remix for USA)" – 3:34
- US 7-inch single
1. "True" – 5:40
2. "Gently" – 4:01
- 12-inch single
1. "True" – 6:30
2. "Lifeline (remix for USA)" – 5:15
3. "Lifeline (a capella)" – 2:01
- 1991 CD single
1. "True (edit)" – 5:36
2. "Lifeline (edited remix)" – 3:39
3. "Heaven Is a Secret" – 4:24
4. "Pleasure" – 3:30

== Personnel ==
Credits adapted from the liner notes for True:

Spandau Ballet

- Tony Hadley – lead vocals
- Gary Kemp – guitar and backing vocals
- Martin Kemp – bass
- Steve Norman – saxophone and percussion
- John Keeble – drums

Additional musician

- Jess Bailey – keyboards

Production

- Tony Swain – producer, engineer
- Steve Jolley – producer
- Spandau Ballet – producers
- Richard Lengyel – engineering assistance
- Tim Young – mastering
- David Band – art direction, illustration
- Stephen Horsfall – typography
- Mixed at Red Bus Studios (London)
- Mastered at CBS Studios (London)

== Charts ==
=== Weekly charts ===
Weekly chart performance for "True"
Chart (1983)	Peak position
Australia (Kent Music Report)	4
Belgium (Ultratop 50 Flanders)	9
Brazil (ABPD)	5
Canada Top Singles (RPM)	1
Canada Adult Contemporary (RPM)	5
France (IFOP)	10
Ireland (IRMA)	1
Luxembourg (Radio Luxembourg)	1
Netherlands (Dutch Top 40)	4
Netherlands (Single Top 100)	5
New Zealand (Recorded Music NZ)	4
Quebec (ADISQ)	5
South Africa (Springbok Radio)	21
Spain (AFYVE)	3
Switzerland (Schweizer Hitparade)	5
UK Singles (Official Charts)	1
US Billboard Hot 100	4
US Adult Contemporary (Billboard)	1
US Mainstream Rock (Billboard)	34
US Hot R&B/Hip-Hop Songs (Billboard)	76
US Cash Box Top 100 Singles	4
Venezuela (AP)	10
West Germany (GfK)	9
Zimbabwe (ZIMA)	15

=== Year-end charts ===
Year-end chart performance for "True"
Chart (1983)	Position
Australia (Kent Music Report)	43
Belgium (Ultratop 50 Flanders)	86
Canada Top Singles (RPM)	19
Netherlands (Dutch Top 40)	49
Netherlands (Single Top 100)	62
New Zealand (Recorded Music NZ)	28
UK Singles (Gallup)	6
US Billboard Hot 100	92
US Cash Box Top 100 Singles	34

== Certifications ==
Certifications and sales for "True"
Region	Certification	Certified units/sales
Australia (ARIA)	Gold	35,000^{^}
Canada (Music Canada)	Gold	50,000^{^}
Denmark (IFPI Danmark)	Gold	45,000^{‡}
Italy (FIMI)	Gold	50,000^{‡}
New Zealand (RMNZ)	Platinum	20,000^{*}
Spain (Promusicae)	Gold	30,000^{‡}
United Kingdom (BPI)	Platinum	600,000^{‡}
^{*} Sales figures based on certification alone.^{^} Shipments figures based on certification alone.^{‡} Sales+streaming figures based on certification alone.

== See also ==
- List of number-one singles of 1983 (Canada)
- List of UK Singles Chart number ones of the 1980s
- List of Billboard Adult Contemporary number ones of 1983

== Bibliography ==
- Bronson, Fred (2003). The Billboard Book of Number One Hits. Billboard Books. ISBN 9780823076772.
- Hadley, Tony (2004). To Cut a Long Story Short. London: Sidgwick & Jackson. ISBN 978-0-283-07386-1.
- Kemp, Gary (2009). I Know This Much: From Soho to Spandau. London: Fourth Estate. ISBN 978-0-00-732330-2.
- Kemp, Martin (2000). True: The Autobiography of Martin Kemp. London: Orion Publishing Group. ISBN 978-0-75-283769-7.
