= Russell Mulcahy =

Australian director (b. 1953)

- Born: 23 June 1953 (age 73); Melbourne, Victoria, Australia
- Education: Corrimal High School
- Occupations: Director; writer; producer
- Years active: 1967−present

Russell Mulcahy (/mʌlˈkæhi/ mul-KA-hee; born 23 June 1953) is an Australian director, writer, and producer. He began his career directing music videos for artists like Elton John and Duran Duran, before making his feature directorial debut with the horror film Razorback (1984). He achieved international prominence by directing the fantasy action film Highlander (1986), which spawned a multimedia franchise.

Mulcahy's subsequent work includes Highlander's first sequel Highlander II: The Quickening (1991), the superhero film The Shadow (1994), the action-horror film Resident Evil: Extinction (2007), and the Errol Flynn biopic In Like Flynn (2018). He was also a director and executive producer of the television series Teen Wolf (2011–17), and directed the show's 2023 feature film spin-off.

Stylistically, Mulcahy's work is recognizable by the use of fast cuts, tracking shots, glowing lights, neo-noir lighting, windblown drapery, and fans.

== Early life ==
Mulcahy was born in Melbourne. He grew up in Mangerton in the Illawarra region of New South Wales and attended Corrimal High School.

When he was 14 he received an 8mm camera and began making short films with his friends. After school he began working as a film editor for Australia's Seven Network. He later said he "used to creep in there at 3am and make my own movies". He also acted on stage and was unsure whether to focus on acting or directing. Two of his films won the City Film Festival Award for Best Independent Short Film and he won Best Short Film at the Sydney Film Festival for "Contrived Mind Flashes".

== Career ==
He was approached by the producer of a Seven pop show and asked to film some original footage and compile a music video (then known as a "film clip") to accompany the Harry Nilsson hit "Everybody's Talkin'" (for which no original video was available).

=== Music videos ===
Mulcahy soon found that he was in demand as a music video director, and made a number of successful film clips for bands from Australia and New Zealand, including Dragon, Hush and AC/DC, and the music video for the Saints' "(I'm) Stranded" (1976).

Tony Hogarth from Wizard Records sent Mulcahy to England to do a video for a punk band in Birmingham. It was well received and Mulcahy decided to stay on in the country. He joined Jon Roseman Productions International and made successful music videos for several noted British pop acts—his early UK credits included Culture Club, the Human League, the Stranglers, XTC's "Making Plans for Nigel" (1979), the Sex Pistols and Paul McCartney.

He directed the Vapors' hit "Turning Japanese" (1980) and his landmark video for the Buggles' "Video Killed the Radio Star" (1979) which became the first music video played on MTV in 1981. Mulcahy recalled, "Nobody knew the impact that the video would have and how timely it was when we were shooting it. We went into the video with no concept of what it was going to do.... It was a one-day shoot. I just had this idea of it being set in a strange laboratory, with a girl coming down a tube on a wire."

In 1978, he went to the United States (for Roseman) and directed videos for The Cryers and Candi Staton - where he first used the "jump cut" - under producer Paul Flattery. Other Mulcahy innovations included spot colour, body painting, glass matte shots and faux widescreen aspect ratio (first used on his Ultravox and Rod Stewart videos) which have all become standards for the genre.

Mulcahy was a friend of Richard Branson and had done videos for Virgin Records. Branson had an idea for making a film about Derek and Clive and hired Mulcachy to shoot one of their albums over two nights. This became Derek and Clive Get the Horn (1979), Mulcahy's first feature.

For the next few years, Mulcahy focused on music videos, becoming one of the leading directors in the field. In 1980 he joined Lexi Godfrey, Scott Millaney, Brian Grant, and David Mallet to form the video company MGMM. He had notable collaborations in particular with Ultravox, Duran Duran (especially "Hungry Like the Wolf"), Kim Carnes, Icehouse, Spandau Ballet, Fleetwood Mac ("Gypsy") (1982), Billy Joel ("Allentown" & "Matter of Trust") (1983), Bonnie Tyler (including "Total Eclipse of the Heart") (1983), the Motels ("Only the Lonely") (1982), Rod Stewart ("Young Turks") (1981) and Elton John.

He has a cameo appearance in the video for "I'm Still Standing" (1983) by Elton John, that he also directed.

Mulcahy later recalled "When people were first asking me to do videos, there was never really a need or a request for a concept. They would just send me a cassette of the song. I'd listen to it with my eyes closed, come up with some ideas and write something down. We'd shoot the video the next day or two days later. It really was just grab what you can and do it."

Warner Bros music chief Jo Berggman called Mulcahy's style "everything but the kitchen sink and more school of video. Russell's work is expensive by music video standards but look at what you get. Wizard of Oz, Singing in the Rain - I mean, name your favorite MGM musical, they're all there."

Mulcahy worked with Duran Duran, directing the key early songs by the band which helped launch them internationally. "We just hit it off," he said. "They were young and brave, as was I really."

In 1982, Mulcahy said he had been approached to make a feature film about a movie palace by David Puttnam, who had success working with first time directors from TV commercials. However, the film was never made.

=== Feature film director ===
==== Razorback ====
Mulcahy's first dramatic feature was in Australia, Razorback (1984). The film was a box office disappointment but has become a cult favorite. He later said:

From my videos and continuing on through RAZORBACK and after, I've always made sure I have a group around me that are as important as me, and people whose expertise and talent I want and encourage. I want them to be part and parcel of the team and to be proud of their work. I guess there has to be a captain of the ship, but it only takes one crew member to screw everything up. You just encourage everyone to do their best and have fun. The more they feel part of it, and the more fun they have, the day goes faster, and the better the work is.

Mulcahy went back to video clips working with Culture Club, Elton John, Berlin and the Rolling Stones. His work for Duran Duran was particularly acclaimed, including the clip for "Wild Boys", Arena (An Absurd Notion) and the As the Lights Go Down concert video.

==== Highlander ====
In 1985, Mulcahy directed the cult film Highlander, starring Christopher Lambert and Sean Connery, featuring music from Queen. Mulcahy said "I loved the genre, I loved the action, and I loved the strange complexity of the intercutting timelines. What really grabbed me though was the sense of tragic, epic romance in the story."

Mulcahy directed several Queen video clips for the Highlander soundtrack (including "A Kind of Magic") as well as works for Billy Joel, Kim Carnes, Kenny Loggins, Def Leppard, Elton John (including "I Don't Wanna Go on with You Like That") and Rod Stewart.

He later directed the Highlander sequel, Highlander II: The Quickening (1991), but disowned it after the completion-bond company interfered with production. He wanted to have his credit changed to Alan Smithee, but as he was not a member of the Directors Guild of America, he had no way of forcing the film-guarantor company to change the credit. He eventually took the opportunity to restore his vision for the film, to a large extent, with the video release of Highlander II: The Renegade Version.

==== Focus on features ====
Mulcahy began to focus on features, mostly action/thrillers, such as Ricochet (1991) with Denzel Washington, Blue Ice (1992) with Michael Caine, The Real McCoy (1993) with Kim Basinger, The Shadow (1994) with Alec Baldwin and Silent Trigger (1996) with Dolph Lundgren.

He was hired by Carolco Pictures to direct Rambo III (1988), but was replaced with second-unit director Peter MacDonald. The collaboration had started well but it became apparent that he had major creative differences with star/writer Sylvester Stallone so Mulcahy left the project. "It was nobody's fault," said Mulcahy later. "Sly is a wonderful man, and we still remain friends."

He continued to direct the occasional video clip for artists like Elton John and began to direct TV shows like Tales from the Crypt, Perversions of Science and The Hunger. He directed the features Tale of the Mummy (1998) and Resurrection (1999), the latter with Christopher Lambert of Highlander.

=== Later career ===
In the 21st century, Mulcahy's work was increasingly on the small screen: On the Beach (2000), filmed in Australia based on the novel by Neville Shute; The Lost Battalion (2001), with Rick Schroder; and 1st to Die (2003); he also did episodes of Queer as Folk, The Young Lions, Jeremiah and Skin.

He returned to features with the Australian Swimming Upstream (2003) but mostly directed TV movies, including 3: The Dale Earnhardt Story (2004), Mysterious Island (2005), The Curse of King Tut's Tomb (2006), The Sitter (2007), Crash and Burn (2007), The Scorpion King: Rise of a Warrior (2008), and Prayers for Bobby (2009).

He directed the features Resident Evil: Extinction (2007) and Give 'em Hell Malone (2009).

Mulcahy was a key director on the Teen Wolf TV series throughout its run and also directed episodes of Eye Candy and The Lizzie Borden Chronicles. He returned to features with In Like Flynn (2018).

== Personal life ==
Mulcahy is gay. He lives in West Hollywood, California, with his partner, David Guzman.

== Filmography ==
=== Feature film ===
Director

- Derek and Clive Get the Horn (1979)
- Razorback (1984)
- Highlander (1986)
- Highlander II: The Quickening (1991)
- Ricochet (1991)
- Blue Ice (1992)
- The Real McCoy (1993)
- The Shadow (1994)
- Silent Trigger (1996)
- Tale of the Mummy (1998)
- Resurrection (1999)
- Swimming Upstream (2003)
- Resident Evil: Extinction (2007)
- The Scorpion King 2: Rise of a Warrior (2008) (Direct-to-video)
- Give 'Em Hell, Malone (2009)
- In Like Flynn (2018)
- Teen Wolf: The Movie (2023)

Writer

- Bait (2012) (also executive producer)

=== Concert video ===
- As the Lights Go Down (1984)
- Arena (An Absurd Notion) (1985)

=== Television ===
Year	Title	Notes
1991–1996	Tales from the Crypt	4 episodes
1997	Perversions of Science	2 episodes
1997–2000	The Hunger	6 episodes
2000	Queer as Folk	5 episodes
2002	Jeremiah	Episode "The Long Road, Part One"
2002	Young Lions	Episodes "The Navy: Part 1 and Part 2"
2003	First to Die	Miniseries
2003–2004	Skin	Episode "Pilot"
2011–2017	Teen Wolf	40 episodes; also executive producer
2015	The Lizzie Borden Chronicles	2 episodes
2020	13 Reasons Why	Episodes "College Tour" and "Winter Break"

TV movies

- On the Beach (2000)
- The Lost Battalion (2001)
- 3: The Dale Earnhardt Story (2004)
- Mysterious Island (2005)
- The Curse of King Tut's Tomb (2006)
- While the Children Sleep (2007)
- Prayers for Bobby (2009)

=== Acting credits ===
Year	Title	Role	Notes
1975	Nuts, Bolts and Bedroom Springs		
1991	Highlander II: The Quickening	Shield Control Technician	Uncredited
2011	Teen Wolf	Pool Owner	Episode "Wolf Moon" (Uncredited)

== Music videography ==
Year	Title	Artist
1975	"Summer Breeze"	Stylus
1976	"Baby, Please Don't Go"	AC/DC
1976	"Problem Child"	AC/DC
1976	"Mondo Bondage"	The Tubes
1977	"(I'm) Stranded"	The Saints
1979	"Duchess"	The Stranglers
1979	"Making Plans for Nigel"	XTC
1979	"Empire State Human"	The Human League
1979	"Circus of Death"	The Human League
1979	"Wonderful Christmastime"	Paul McCartney
1979	"Video Killed the Radio Star"	The Buggles
1980	"Living in the Plastic Age"	The Buggles
1980	"One-Two-Five"	10cc
1980	"Bear Cage"	The Stranglers
1980	"Red Frame/White Light"	Orchestral Manoeuvres in the Dark
1980	"Turning Japanese"	The Vapors
1981	"Guilty"	Classix Nouveaux
1981	"Heels of the Wind"	Elton John
1981	"Nobody Wins"	Elton John
1981	"Elton's Song"	Elton John
1981	"Heart in the Right Place"	Elton John
1981	"Fanfare"	Elton John
1981	"Carla/Etude"	Elton John
1981	"Just like Belgium"	Elton John
1981	"The Fox"	Elton John
1981	"Je veux de la tendresse"	Elton John
1981	"Chloe"	Elton John
1981	"Fascist Faces"	Elton John
1981	"Breaking Down Barriers"	Elton John
1981	"Passing Strangers"	Ultravox
1981	"Vienna"	Ultravox
1981	"The Thin Wall"	Ultravox
1981	"The Voice"	Ultravox
1981	"Tonight I'm Yours (Don't Hurt Me)"	Rod Stewart
1981	"Young Turks"	Rod Stewart
1981	"We Can Get Together"	Icehouse
1981	"Icehouse"	Icehouse
1981	"Bette Davis Eyes"	Kim Carnes
1981	"Draw of the Cards"	Kim Carnes
1981	"Sports Fans"	The Tubes
1981	"White Punks on Dope"	The Tubes
1981	"Talk to Ya Later"	The Tubes
1981	"Sushi Girl"	The Tubes
1981	"Let's Make Some Noise"	The Tubes
1981	"Don't Want to Wait Anymore"	The Tubes
1981	"Business"	The Tubes
1981	"Mr. Hate"	The Tubes
1981	"Amnesia"	The Tubes
1981	"A Matter of Pride"	The Tubes
1981	"Muscle Bound"	Spandau Ballet
1981	"Paint Me Down"	Spandau Ballet
1981	"Chant No. 1 (I Don't Need This Pressure On)"	Spandau Ballet
1981	"Planet Earth"	Duran Duran
1981	"My Own Way"	Duran Duran
1982	"Lonely in Your Nightmare"	Duran Duran
1982	"Save a Prayer"	Duran Duran
1982	"Hungry Like the Wolf"	Duran Duran
1982	"Rio"	Duran Duran
1982	"Oh Diane"	Fleetwood Mac
1982	"Gypsy"	Fleetwood Mac
1982	"Take the L"	The Motels
1982	"Only the Lonely"	The Motels
1982	"Allentown"	Billy Joel
1982	"Pressure"	Billy Joel
1982	"She's Right on Time"	Billy Joel
1982	"Hey Little Girl"	Icehouse
1982	"Going to a Go-Go"	The Rolling Stones
1982	"Talk Talk"	Talk Talk
1982	"It's Raining Again"	Supertramp
1982	"Voyeur"	Kim Carnes
1982	"Instinction"	Spandau Ballet
1982	"She Loved Like Diamond"	Spandau Ballet
1983	"True"	Spandau Ballet
1983	"Night Boat"	Duran Duran
1983	"Is There Something I Should Know?"	Duran Duran
1983	"I'm Still Standing"	Elton John
1983	"I Guess That's Why They Call It the Blues"	Elton John
1983	"Total Eclipse of the Heart"	Bonnie Tyler
1983	"Never Say Die (Give a Little Bit More)"	Cliff Richard
1983	"Say You Don't Know Me"	Kim Carnes
1983	"Street Cafe"	Icehouse
1984	"Taking the Town"	Icehouse
1984	"Sex (I'm a ...)"	Berlin
1984	"The War Song"	Culture Club
1984	"The Reflex"	Duran Duran
1984	"The Wild Boys"	Duran Duran
1984	"Sad Songs (Say So Much)"	Elton John
1985	"Wrap Her Up"	Elton John
1985	"Act of War"	Elton John
1985	"Save a Prayer" (Live)	Duran Duran
1985	"Call Me"	Go West
1985	"Jeanny"	Falco
1985	"One Hit (To the Body)"	The Rolling Stones
1986	"The Flame"	Arcadia (Duran Duran)
1986	"A Matter of Trust"	Billy Joel
1986	"Divided Hearts"	Kim Carnes
1986	"A Kind of Magic"	Queen
1986	"Princes of the Universe"	Queen
1987	"Meet Me Half Way"	Kenny Loggins
1987	"Sold"	Boy George
1987	"Pour Some Sugar on Me"	Def Leppard
1988	"My Heart Can't Tell You No"	Rod Stewart
1988	"A Word in Spanish"	Elton John
1988	"Town of Plenty"	Elton John
1988	"I Don't Wanna Go on with You Like That"	Elton John
1989	"Healing Hands"	Elton John
1989	"Crazy About Her"	Rod Stewart
1989	"Whisper"	Boy George
1990	"How Much Love"	Vixen
1992	"The One"	Elton John
1993	"Simple Life"	Elton John
1994	"Original Sin"	Taylor Dayne
