= Voyer =

Voyer may refer to:

== People ==
- Bernard Voyer (born 1953), Canadian explorer and mountaineer
- Harold Voyer (born 1997), French footballer
- Jean-Pierre Voyer (1938–2019), French philosopher
- Joachim Ulric Voyer (1892-1935), Canadian composer
- Marc Antoine René de Voyer, (1722–1787), French ambassador

== Places ==
- Voyer, Moselle, Grand Est, France

== See also ==
- Voyeur (disambiguation)
