= Instinction (song) =

Single by Spandau Ballet

from the album Diamond
- B-side: "Gently"
- Released: 2 April 1982
- Genre: New wave; funk
- Length: 3:36 (single version); 4:48 (album version); 6:57 (Diamond box set version)
- Label: Chrysalis
- Songwriter: Gary Kemp
- Producers: Richard James Burgess; Trevor Horn

Spandau Ballet singles chronology
| "She Loved Like Diamond" (1982) | "Instinction" (1982) | "Lifeline" (1982) |

"Instinction" is a song by Spandau Ballet whose original version was included on their second album Diamond as produced by Richard James Burgess. The song was written by band guitarist/songwriter Gary Kemp. A remix by Trevor Horn was released on 2 April 1982 as the last single from the album and reached number 10 on the UK Singles Chart. This new version received good reviews but constituted a shift into pop music that did not interest the patrons of trendy London nightclubs that Spandau Ballet originally intended to represent. The band tried continuing their work with Horn on the songs for their next album but came to an impasse with him and moved on to a successful relationship with producers Steve Jolley and Tony Swain.

== Background ==
Following the disappointing chart performances of "Paint Me Down" and "She Loved Like Diamond", Spandau Ballet manager Steve Dagger felt they needed another single from their just-released Diamond album so that it would sell. He thought "Instinction" would be the best choice but thought it needed to be remixed, and band guitarist/songwriter Gary Kemp agreed on his selection, acknowledging that "the song had more pop in it than anything we'd ever done". The band wanted a new producer to rework the song because of their dismay over how Diamond turned out in the hands of Richard James Burgess. Producer Martin Rushent was fresh off his success with the album Dare by the Human League, but Kemp explained to New Sounds New Styles magazine in 1982 that the band felt they "couldn't" have him do the remix because it "would have been such an obvious thing to do". Bucks Fizz mastermind Andy Hill was also considered for the job, but they settled on Buggles founder Trevor Horn based on the work he had done with the UK pop vocal group Dollar. Transitioning to a more mainstream sound worried Kemp since Spandau Ballet initially intended to create music that represented the trendy club scene in London. He wondered what the Blitz crowd would think of their shift to "outright pop", but Dagger said to him, "You can't be a cult band and sell millions of records, can you? What would you rather?"

When Dagger contacted Jill Sinclair, Horn's wife and manager, she immediately agreed to his participation. Horn later said he thought Spandau Ballet's two previous singles were "very ugly", noting, "I thought that, with Tony Hadley's voice, the way the records were mixed hadn't done him any favours at all." When Kemp and Hadley met with Horn to discuss the project, he told them it was a good song, adding, "It's just not produced," and Hadley agreed to Horn's request to re-record his vocals.

Meanwhile, the One Liners column in the 27 February 1982 issue of Record Mirror magazine reported that "the next Spandau Ballet single will not be produced by Landscape bod Richard Burgess..." That column in the next issue explained that "an unusually calm and polite Steve Dagger called last week to deny that Spandau are dumping producer Richard Burgess."

== Recording ==
I thought it was going to make me look like the cavalry that comes charging in at the end of the film and saves the wagon train.

–Trevor Horn on the band's request that he remix "Instinction"

Some band members were especially displeased with the original recording of "Instinction", which was included on the album. Hadley found the production on that version to be "abysmal" and wrote that Spandau drummer John Keeble "reckons it is possibly the worst thing he has ever been associated with." Horn described it as "half-baked" and "in bad shape", theorizing that the criticism that Hadley already endured and the strain from working with Burgess had taken a toll on him and affected his singing. Hadley appreciated working with Horn, who made him feel as though what he had to say was being heard and brought out the best in the band members by focusing on their strengths.

According to Kemp, Horn "tore 'Instinction' down and rebuilt it bar by bar." In addition to Hadley's redo, Kemp did more work on backing vocals, guitar and piano, Steve Norman did percussion, and Anne Dudley was brought in to do some additional keyboards as well as harp accompaniment. Horn had Hadley and Kemp assist him with the final mixing of the tracks and later said, "I would have liked 'Instinction' to have been a little more economical, but unfortunately I didn't record it. I just remixed it and overdubbed it. I felt that it needed bringing to life, but in the process I had to busy it up too. I think I achieved that if you compare it to the other version."

== Critical reception ==
Spandau Ballet - "Instinction"
One critic wrote that "the heart of the song is Martin Kemp's surprisingly limber, almost funky bassline".

Ian Birch of Smash Hits predicted that Horn would improve Spandau Ballet's situation with his addition of "all those magical ingredients like synthesised drum cracks and chattering percussion." Sunie Fletcher of Record Mirror confirmed that "the difference he makes is beyond measure". She added, "There's a feeling of space about it, too, a Horn trademark, as are the breathy backing vocals" and noted that Hadley had toned down his performance, all contributing to make this the "best Ballet 45... to date."

In a retrospective review on AllMusic, Stewart Mason criticized the first Diamond single, "Chant No. 1 (I Don't Need This Pressure On)", insisting that "Instinction" was "far more successful" and "the best dance-oriented single Spandau Ballet ever managed." He wrote, "The main hook is in the Earth, Wind & Fire-style horn section, ... but the heart of the song is Martin Kemp's surprisingly limber, almost funky bassline, which blends with the Latin percussion to make a dancefloor-friendly groove."

== Release and commercial performance ==
"Instinction" was released on 2 April 1982 and peaked at number 10 on the UK Singles Chart, number 20 in Ireland and number 35 in Australia. As with their other successful singles, they were invited to perform it on the British music chart television programme Top of the Pops.

== Music video ==
Spandau Ballet resumed their partnership with director Russell Mulcahy for the "Instinction" music video but told him there would be no nightclub setting as they had in the clip for "Chant No. 1", no dwarfs like the ones in "Muscle Bound", no Blitz Kids creations to wear as they began doing with "To Cut a Long Story Short" and no role playing. Gary Kemp described what some of them did wear as "early Alpinist/hunter chic; a sort of yodelling Elmer Fudd look", courtesy of the Army & Navy store in Camden Town. They wanted to just film it in a studio with a simple set and, as Kemp noted, "for the first time, we would be smiling. It was time for Spandau Ballet to make a pop video".

== Aftermath ==
In the wake of "She Loved Like Diamond", Chris Wright, founder of Chrysalis Records, was ready to give up on Spandau Ballet. In his 2004 autobiography To Cut a Long Story Short, Hadley expressed his certainty that "Instinction" had "persuaded Chrysalis that we were worth another chance. I have no doubt that in the current climate, where there is no room for failure, we would have been dropped." Kemp's concern about the Blitz crowd, however, became a reality as their popularity was now considered too mainstream to be of interest to London's nightclub crowd. He now felt free to write without worrying what new trends were popping up on the club scene and was eager to get started.

He immediately wanted to try another approach at incorporating the American Jewish music that had an eastern European feel like he had on "She Loved Like Diamond". The song he came up with was "Gold", which would be recorded for the next album along with another track that Horn was especially interested in, "Pleasure". Horn wanted to start working on "Pleasure" right away, but after a day of rehearsals in which drummer John Keeble was unable to meet Horn's standard of perfection, the new producer was ready to replace him. Kemp rejected the idea, and Horn decided to end his work with the band. Kemp told Smash Hits magazine in 1982, "We couldn't have worked with Trevor because he was too overpowering, too dogmatic."

Dagger suggested producers Tony Swain and Steve Jolley, who had recently worked with Bananarama, so the band presented the duo with several songs Kemp had finished writing. The plan was to have them produce just one single to get a sense if they were right for the group before committing to anything more, and although "Communication" was considered, the song Jolley chose for their assignment was the "up-tempo, more obvious pop sing-along" titled "Lifeline". Spandau Ballet was credited alongside Jolley and Swain as producers of "Lifeline", which went to number 7 on the UK Singles Chart in the autumn of 1982, as well as their next album, True, which spent a week at number 1 on the UK Albums Chart in 1983.

== Formats and track listings ==
- 7-inch single
1. "Instinction" — 3:36
2. "Gently" — 4:01
- 12-inch single
1. "Instinction" — 3:36
2. "Chant No. 1" (remix) — 8:03
3. "Gently" — 4:01

== Personnel ==
Credits adapted from the liner notes for Diamond, except as noted:

Spandau Ballet

- Tony Hadley – lead vocals and backing vocals
- Gary Kemp – synthesizers, electric guitars, guzheng, backing vocals, horn arrangements
- Martin Kemp – bass, backing vocals
- Steve Norman – bongos, congas, timbales, tablas and backing vocals
- John Keeble – electronic drums

Additional musicians

- David "Baps" Baptiste – saxophones and flute
- Nat Augustin – trombone
- Canute "Kenny" Wellington – trumpet
- Beggar & Co – horn arrangements
- Anne Dudley – additional keyboards, harp; string arrangements

Production

- Richard James Burgess – producer
- Trevor Horn – producer
- Graham Smith – sleeve design

== Charts ==
| Chart (1982) | Peak position |
|---|---|
| Australia (Kent Music Report) | 35 |
| Ireland (IRMA) | 20 |
| Luxembourg (Radio Luxembourg) | 21 |
| UK Singles (OCC) | 10 |

== Bibliography ==
- Gimarc, George (1997). Post Punk Diary, 1980–1982. St. Martin's Press. ISBN 978-0-312-16968-8.
- Hadley, Tony (2004). To Cut a Long Story Short. Sidgwick & Jackson. ISBN 978-0-283-07386-1.
- Kemp, Gary (2009). I Know This Much: From Soho to Spandau. London: Fourth Estate. ISBN 978-0-00-732330-2.
- Kent, David (1993). Australian Chart Book 1970–1992 (illustrated ed.). St Ives, N.S.W.: Australian Chart Book. ISBN 0-646-11917-6.
