= Voyeur (disambiguation) =

A voyeur is someone who watches other people engaged in intimate behaviors.

Voyeur or Voyeurs may also refer to:

== Film and television ==
- The Voyeur (1970 film), an Italian film
- The Voyeur (1994 film), an Italian film
- Voyeur (film), a 2017 American film
- The Voyeurs, 2021 American film
- "Voyeurs" (Room 104), a 2017 television episode

== Music ==
=== Albums ===
- Voyeur (Berlin album)
- Voyeur (Kim Carnes album)
- Voyeur (Saint Motel album)
- Voyeur (David Sanborn album)
- Voyeurs (album), an album by 2wo
- Voyeur (War from a Harlots Mouth album)
- Voyeur, an album by Renato Zero

=== Songs ===
- "Voyeur" (Blink-182 song)
- "Voyeur" (Kim Carnes song)

== Other uses ==
- Voyeur (manga), a Japanese manga series by Hideo Yamamoto
- Voyeur (video game), a 1993 video game series
- Voyeur (horse), a show jumping horse
- Voyeur, a sworn official of a visite royale in Jersey
