= Diamond (Spandau Ballet album) =

1982 studio album by Spandau Ballet

Studio album by Spandau Ballet
- Released: 12 March 1982
- Recorded: 1981
- Studios: Jam, Eden, Sarm West, Utopia, AIR, Abbey Road and The Town House (London)
- Length: 39:16
- Labels: Chrysalis; Reformation
- Producer: Richard James Burgess

Spandau Ballet chronology
Journeys to Glory (1981)	Diamond (1982)	True (1983)

Singles from Diamond
- 1. "Chant No. 1 (I Don't Need This Pressure On)" Released: 10 July 1981; 2. "Paint Me Down" Released: 2 November 1981; 3. "She Loved Like Diamond" Released: 11 January 1982; 4. "Instinction" Released: 2 April 1982

Diamond is the second studio album by the English band Spandau Ballet, released on 12 March 1982 by Chrysalis Records. As with their debut album, Journeys to Glory, all songs were produced by Richard James Burgess and written by band guitarist Gary Kemp. The music was inspired by a variety of genres, including the renewed interest in funk around Soho, American film scores with roots in eastern Europe, the second side of David Bowie's Low album, Pink Floyd records and the mood pieces of another English new wave band, Japan.

Burgess, Kemp and lead singer Tony Hadley had difficulties over the course of making the album. After the first song written for it, "Chant No. 1 (I Don't Need This Pressure On)", became the band's biggest hit, Kemp found it harder to churn out material to complete the project. Burgess began to exercise control over Hadley, who struggled with the vocals to the point of losing his temper and needing to take some time off. The recording sessions involved six different studios because of Burgess's busy schedule, and the band's decision to have a separate box set of 12-inch remixes of every song on the album in addition to the 7- and 12-inch single versions took even more of his time.

The next two singles, "Paint Me Down" and "She Loved Like Diamond", did not perform well, but another track from the album, "Instinction", was remixed by Trevor Horn and made the top ten in the UK. Because the new single had more of a pop feel than anything Spandau Ballet had released before, the nightclub crowd that the band had initially intended to represent lost interest in them, but Kemp then felt free to write pop songs on future projects without wondering if it was something their fans could dance to.

Diamond reached number 15 on the UK Albums Chart and received Gold certification from the British Phonographic Industry. Side two of the album, which Kemp intended as film music, did not impress reviewers and was widely criticized. The band was unhappy with how the entire album turned out and decided to end their relationship with Burgess. Horn was interested in some material Kemp had started for their next album but clashed with drummer John Keeble during rehearsals and decided to move on. Spandau Ballet chose to have Tony Swain and Steve Jolley join them in producing their next album, True, which was a huge success.

Diamond was re-released in a remastered and expanded two-disc special edition on 8 March 2010.

== Background and development ==
By the time Spandau Ballet had completed their first album, Journeys to Glory, their guitarist/songwriter Gary Kemp found that musical tastes around Soho were shifting toward funk. This eventually inspired him to write "Chant No. 1 (I Don't Need This Pressure On)", which became a number 3 hit on the UK Singles Chart in the summer of 1981 and the first song completed for Diamond. Its success added to the stress Kemp was already experiencing in having to write enough material to fill an album. In his autobiography I Know This Much: From Soho to Spandau, he wrote, "Unlike second marriages, second albums are notoriously difficult. Journeys had been developed over some time and played live before we went into the recording studio, with some songs being discarded at the last minute. It was a mission statement, cohesive and tight, with none of the indulgence that often plagues follow-ups."

== Songs ==
Spandau Ballet wanted to represent the young London nightclub crowd through their music, and "Chant No. 1" paid tribute to the newest hotspot, Le Beat Route. Suffering from writer's block as it climbed the charts, Kemp simply repeated the use of horns and group vocals from that hit in writing what would be the second single from the album, "Paint Me Down". A third track released before Diamond was completed, "She Loved Like Diamond", was inspired by his exposure to movie themes and musicals that had American Jewish music with roots in eastern Europe. It began side two of the vinyl and cassette editions of the album and was followed by a suite of three songs – "Pharaoh", "Innocence and Science", and "Missionary" – that was intended to suggest film music. His brother and band bass guitarist, Martin Kemp, told Smash Hits magazine in a 1982 interview that the suite was their effort to "get out of the Duran Duran league", but Gary Kemp more specifically revealed a few of his inspirations for that set of songs. In his autobiography he wrote that he was "wanting to attempt things in the vein of Bowie's second side of Low or the mood pieces by Japan." In 2021 he said he was "trying to make a [Pink] Floyd record, with soundscapes and the rest of it. We didn’t know if we were going to go prog or not. Obviously, things turned out very differently.

== Recording ==
Richard Burgess had come on board as producer [of Journeys to Glory] primarily because he moved in the same social circles as us. We had run into him in the Blitz. There was no more to it than that, really. He wasn’t even a producer; he was the drummer in a band called Landscape.

— Tony Hadley on his reluctance to continue working with Burgess after the first album

Lead singer Tony Hadley had found himself more and more isolated from the other band members during the time that they traveled to promote their first album, and that isolation was only compounded as he had difficulty performing the vocals for Diamond while the band watched him through the glass from the control room; he attributed his struggle to the fact that he disliked several of the songs and felt his confidence was gone. Spandau Ballet chose to continue working with Journeys to Glory producer Richard James Burgess on Diamond, the recording of which was prolonged because of the need to use several different studios in order to accommodate Burgess's schedule. Hadley was especially frustrated during the making of the album because of an escalating friction between him and Burgess, which began while recording "Chant No. 1"; although the music sessions went well, according to Kemp, Burgess wanted Hadley's voice to convey the "film noir quality of the lyrics by having Tony sing it quietly, restrained, and with a sense of paranoia. Tony has such a huge voice that Richard wanted him to relax it as much as possible" but was unable to elicit what he wanted to hear with Hadley standing and had him lie down to get the effect he and Kemp had in mind.

Hadley's discord with Burgess was most apparent when he had trouble singing "Paint Me Down" and the producer suspended a rug over two microphone stands and had him lie down underneath it to help him relax as he sang. Years later, band member Steve Norman commented, "It was a great idea, like [something Bowie producer] Tony Visconti would come up with." When Hadley pointed out that the backing vocals his bandmates were recording for the song were out of tune, Burgess's dismissal of his concerns left him even more frustrated. The song's number 30 peak on the UK Singles Chart came in the middle of recording the Diamond album, and while Kemp later admitted that he and Burgess were to blame for its disappointing showing, he was also sorry that Hadley was the one at whom everyone seemed to be pointing the finger. The tension mounted as Hadley continued to struggle with the rest of the songs while the band watched his sessions through the glass, and it reached the breaking point the day he lost his temper and picked up a fire extinguisher; he got a hold of his senses before throwing it through the control-room window and instead walked out. He took a few days off to recover before returning to the studio.

When the band finished recording the album, they played it for Chrysalis executives, whose faces sat frozen when it was over; none of them said anything. Kemp realized later that the band never got together to discuss what the album should be; they just left him to write songs without providing any feedback. While playing the album for Chrysalis, Kemp sensed that the side two suite was especially difficult for the executives to sit through. He later defended those songs, arguing that they "were never realised with the panache they needed."

== Critical reception ==
Professional ratings
Review scores
Source	Rating
AllMusic	3/5 stars
Record Mirror	2.5/5 stars
The Rolling Stone Album Guide	1/5 stars
Smash Hits	3/10

Although most reviews at the time of its release were negative, some critics gave Spandau Ballet credit for doing something different. Billboard magazine wrote that, whereas Journeys to Glory "was too similar from track to track, this one shows the band moving in new directions. The experimentation is not always successful, notably on side two," where Kemp attempted a mix of film music and progressive rock. Mike Nicholls of Record Mirror had mixed feelings about that side, especially with regard to the album's closer, "Missionary": "At best its eastern chants and listless sitar show Spandau entering new avenues." He also noted that "'Innocence and Science' has an obviously Oriental flavour, Gary Kemp trying his chops at 'cheng', which, in conjunction with the lapping water effects provides a quaintly Floydian 'Grantchester Meadows' atmosphere." In concluding he warned that "the band have become victims of their obsessive stylization, and unless they break free from their neurotic need to be super-hip, they will soon stagnate beyond the point of no return." Red Starr of Smash Hits thought "'Chant No. 1' and a couple of the simpler moments are OK, but mostly it’s a bad case of running before you can walk," and that the album had "painfully pretentious lyrics whose irritation is doubled by those awful stilted vocals, some overblown, heavy-handed muzak arrangements plus a couple of mock Oriental pieces to boot. Not only is it contrived rubbish, it’s boring contrived rubbish."

Other critics at the time of its release had nothing positive or constructive to offer. In Sounds magazine Dave McCullough wrote, "Diamond is a cold hotch-potch of a terribly studio-sounding second album that is 'light' in the sense it doesn't want to be, both sounding unconvinced and being, simply, unconvincing." Richard Cook was especially critical of the album in his New Musical Express review. While he acknowledged that the other complaints by his colleagues were valid, he felt the album's most troubling aspect was the box set of four twelve-inch 45s, which he felt was "the most accurate reflection of Kemp's grandiose, inflatory plundering of any stylistic milieu he feels privy to." In describing "Chant No. 1" as "the one Spandau tune to pay tithes direct to disco convention," he asserts that "Spandau Ballet, whatever their declared intentions, have never really made an Anglo-funk equivalent to any American disco language. No producer of U.S. black music would countenance the dry, ascetic sound favoured by Richard Burgess or content himself with the spareness of Spandau's instrumental resources." He laid the blame at the songwriter's feet: "Kemp has probably brought it upon himself by insisting on credence for his soul roots – nevertheless, Spandau's idiosyncratic, danceable pop has suffered by its association with funk instead of thriving on it." He also found much to criticize about the side two suite and labeled the album "a failure".

Retrospective reviews were mixed. In The Rolling Stone Album Guide, Paul Evans was dismissive of Journeys to Glory and described the new album as "more of the same" with the exception of the side two suite, which he did not think helped. On AllMusic Dan LeRoy was also unimpressed by the experimental songs but thought Diamond was "an improvement on their debut"; in reviewing a reissue pairing their first two albums, Dave Thompson wrote, "There are moments spread across Diamond where it's already difficult to believe that you're contending with the same band that made such a splash upon their arrival," but thought a few songs, including the much-derided closer "Missionary", represented "where the group sets the controls for the heart of a sun far funkier than any visualized by sundry better-respected Britfunk merchants."

== Singles and videos ==
The number 3 showing of "Chant No. 1 (I Don't Need This Pressure On)" on the UK Singles Chart was the highest peak position Spandau Ballet had achieved at that point. It also reached the pop charts in Australia, Ireland, the Netherlands, New Zealand and Spain, and in the U.S. the 12-inch remix of the song charted on Billboard magazine's Disco Top 100. The music video showed the band performing the song at Le Beat Route. Although Cook disliked the box-set version, "Chant No. 1" otherwise received positive reviews. Smash Hits magazine called it "their best effort to date", Paul Lester of BBC Online described it as "a revolutionary white-funk record", and in The Independent, Dylan Jones proclaimed it "one of the most important records of the early Eighties".

The peak at 30 in the UK for "Paint Me Down" was their worst chart performance there to date. Critics were differing in their opinions, with Smash Hits labeling it "cringeworthy" and Dan LeRoy of AllMusic calling it "tuneless" while that site's Dave Thompson thought it "represented the peak of Spandau's ambition". The music video included footage shot as the sun came up behind silhouettes of the seemingly naked band members as they smeared paint upon themselves, and the BBC refused to play it because of nudity.

The music video for the third single, "She Loved Like Diamond", showed each of the band members in scenes with the song's deceased title character, either through flashbacks or on the grounds of the estate she was haunting. Hadley's vocals were judged as excessive in most reviews of the song: Smash Hits preferred the instrumental version on the B-side of the 7-inch single because of his singing; Sounds magazine described the song as "unlistenable"; and Cook thought the performance was "absurdly overwrought". He did, however, admit that the song had "the best melody on the record". Mike Nicholls of Record Mirror exonerated Hadley, calling the song "a great 45 with melody to match the, for once, appropriate vocal posing." The song's number 49 showing on the UK Singles Chart put Spandau Ballet in "panic mode", but their manager suggested remixing and releasing another song from the album, "Instinction", to boost Diamond sales.

Disappointed with Burgess's work on the album, the band realized that they needed to find another producer to handle the remixing of "Instinction" and began working with Trevor Horn on rebuilding the song. Kemp was concerned, however, that shifting to a pop producer would mean losing the interest of the dance club crowd they initially attracted as their fanbase. The new version became the album's fourth single and reached number 10 in the UK; it also charted in Australia and Ireland. They opted to scale back on the expenses they incurred with their previous music videos and do a simple performance clip. In their review, Smash Hits reported that Horn "saved the Spans from the dumper" by turning the original recording "inside out". Despite Kemp's concern about clubgoers, AllMusic called it "the best dance-oriented single Spandau Ballet ever managed."

== Commercial performance ==
Diamond was released on 12 March 1982, five months after the band had finished recording it. In an interview with New Sounds New Styles magazine in May of that year, Kemp was asked why it took so long to get the album finished and in stores and responded, "Oh, just record company rubbish. It always seems to happen – trouble with the artwork. Things like that." On 20 March Diamond began 17 weeks on the UK Albums Chart, during which time it reached number 15. It also charted at number 9 in New Zealand, number 22 in Sweden, number 39 in Australia and number 40 in Canada. The British Phonographic Industry awarded the album Silver certification on 30 April of that year and Gold certification 8 months later, on 9 December, for reaching the respective 60,000 and 100,000 units of shipment thresholds.

== Aftermath ==
When the Horn remix of "Instinction" started to become popular with radio DJs, Kemp met with Burgess to communicate Spandau Ballet's decision to move on to another producer for future projects. As the band prepared for their next album later that year, Kemp told Smash Hits, "We moved away from Richard because we didn't want to get in a rut." In a 1986 interview with Billboard magazine, Burgess said that he was also ready to move on because the amount of remixing required for the Diamond box set in addition to the 7- and 12-inch single mixes left him exhausted.

The success of "Instinction" as a full-fledged pop song also confirmed Kemp's belief that the original followers of Spandau Ballet would no longer be interested in their music. He now felt free to write in whatever style he chose without worrying about how it would play to the London club scene. Horn was especially interested in one of the first songs he came up with, which was called "Pleasure". He wanted to start working on it right away, but after a day of rehearsals in which he was dissatisfied with what he was getting from drummer John Keeble, he spoke to Kemp about programming the drums while they looked for someone to replace Keeble. Kemp rejected the idea, and Horn decided to end his work with the band. Kemp also told Smash Hits, "We couldn't have worked with Trevor because he was too overpowering, too dogmatic."

Dagger suggested producers Tony Swain and Steve Jolley, who had recently worked with Bananarama, so the band presented the duo with several songs Kemp had finished writing. The plan was to have them produce just one single to get a sense if they were right for the group before committing to anything more, and although "Communication" was considered, the song Jolley chose for their assignment was the "up-tempo, more obvious pop sing-along" titled "Lifeline". Spandau Ballet was credited alongside Jolley and Swain as producers of "Lifeline", which went to number 7 on the UK Singles Chart in the autumn of 1982, as well as their next album, True, which spent a week at number 1 on the UK Albums Chart in 1983.

Spandau Ballet originally intended to represent the clientele of the trendy London nightclub the Blitz by playing "white European disco music", but the disfavoring of the band by clubgoers that concerned Kemp was witnessed first-hand by music journalist Paul Simper, who, in his autobiography Pop Stars in My Pantry: A Memoir of Pop Mags and Clubbing in the 1980s, detailed Graham Smith's reactions to a couple of their songs. Smith, a Blitz regular who had designed the cover art for Spandau Ballet's first two albums and their singles, encountered Simper while delivering the cover he had produced for "She Loved Like Diamond" and was already losing interest in the band, but upon the release of "Lifeline", Smith was visibly disappointed as he played a cassette of the new "mop-top-flavoured" song for Simper, who concluded, "Spandau were no longer making records for the cool kids."

== Track listing ==
All tracks are written by Gary Kemp.

No.	Title	Length
1.	"Chant No. 1 (I Don't Need This Pressure On)"	4:07
2.	"Instinction"	4:47
3.	"Paint Me Down"	3:45
4.	"Coffee Club"	5:32
5.	"She Loved Like Diamond"	2:56
6.	"Pharaoh"	6:37
7.	"Innocence and Science"	4:27
8.	"Missionary"	7:00

Diamond – 12" box set (alternate track listing)
No.	Title	Length
1.	"Chant No. 1 (I Don't Need This Pressure On)" (remix)	8:03
2.	"Instinction" (remix)	6:57
3.	"Paint Me Down" (remix)	6:22
4.	"Coffee Club" (remix)	6:48
5.	"She Loved Like Diamond" (extended version)	3:37
6.	"Pharaoh"	6:37
7.	"Innocence and Science"	4:27
8.	"Missionary"	7:00

Diamond – 2010 edition (bonus tracks)
No.	Title	Length
9.	"Chant No. 1 (I Don't Need This Pressure On)" (remix)	8:03
10.	"Instinction" (remix)	6:57
11.	"Paint Me Down" (remix)	6:22
12.	"Coffee Club" (remix)	6:48
13.	"She Loved Like Diamond" (extended version)	3:37

Diamond – 2010 edition (bonus disc)
No.	Title	Length
1.	"Feel the Chant" (7” version)	4:06
2.	"Man with Guitar"	2:52
3.	"Gently"	4:00
4.	"Chant No. 1 (I Don't Need This Pressure On)" (12” version)	5:52
5.	"Feel the Chant" (12” version)	5:49
6.	"Paint Me Down" (12” version)	7:05
7.	"Re-Paint"	6:57
8.	"Instinction" (Trevor Horn 12” mix)	3:40
9.	"The Freeze" (BBC in Concert Bournemouth, 10/4/82)	5:12
10.	"To Cut a Long Story Short" (BBC in Concert Bournemouth, 10/4/82)	3:51
11.	"Glow" (BBC in Concert Bournemouth, 10/4/82)	5:14
12.	"Paint Me Down" (BBC in Concert Bournemouth, 10/4/82)	4:46
13.	"Instinction / Chant No. 1" (BBC in Concert Bournemouth, 10/4/82)	6:12

== Personnel ==
Credits adapted from the liner notes for Diamond:

=== Spandau Ballet ===
- Tony Hadley – lead vocals and backing vocals
- Gary Kemp – synthesizers, electric guitars, guzheng, backing vocals, horn arrangements
- Martin Kemp – bass, backing vocals
- Steve Norman – bongos, congas, timbales, tablas and backing vocals
- John Keeble – electronic drums

=== Additional musicians ===
- David "Baps" Baptiste – saxophones and flute
- Nat Augustin – trombone
- Kenny Wellington – trumpet
- Beggar & Co – horn arrangements
- Richard James Burgess – horn arrangements

=== Technical ===
- Richard James Burgess – production
- John Etchells – engineering
- Colin Fairley – engineering
- Nicholas Froome – engineering
- Andy Jackson – engineering
- Gary Langan – engineering
- Peter Walsh – engineering
- Graham Smith – sleeve design
- Andy Earl – photography
- Mastered at The Town House (London) and Sterling Sound (New York City)

== Charts ==
=== Weekly charts ===
Weekly chart performance for Diamond
Chart (1982)	Peak position
Australian Albums (Kent Music Report)	39
Canada Top Albums/CDs (RPM)	40
New Zealand Albums (RMNZ)	9
Swedish Albums (Sverigetopplistan)	22
UK Albums (Official Charts)	15

=== Year-end charts ===
Year-end chart performance for Diamond
Chart (1982)	Position
UK Albums (OCC)	76

== Certifications ==
Certifications for Diamond
Region	Certification	Certified units/sales
United Kingdom (BPI)	Gold	100,000^{^}
^{^} Shipments figures based on certification alone.

== Bibliography ==
- Gimarc, George (1997). Post Punk Diary, 1980–1982. St. Martin's Press. ISBN 978-0-312-16968-8.
- Hadley, Tony (2004). To Cut a Long Story Short. Sidgwick & Jackson. ISBN 978-0-283-07386-1.
- Kemp, Gary (2009). I Know This Much: From Soho to Spandau. London: Fourth Estate. ISBN 978-0-00-732330-2.
- Kent, David (1993). Australian Chart Book 1970–1992 (illustrated ed.). St Ives, N.S.W.: Australian Chart Book. ISBN 0-646-11917-6.
