= She Loved Like Diamond =

Single by Spandau Ballet

from the album Diamond
- B-side: "She Loved Like Diamond" (instrumental)
- Released: 11 January 1982
- Recorded: 1981
- Genre: New wave
- Length: 2:55 (7" version); 3:37 (12" version)
- Label: Chrysalis; Reformation
- Songwriter: Gary Kemp
- Producer: Richard James Burgess

Spandau Ballet singles chronology
"Paint Me Down" (1981)	"She Loved Like Diamond" (1982)	"Instinction" (1982)

"She Loved Like Diamond" is a song by the English new wave band Spandau Ballet, released on 11 January 1982 as the third single from what would be their second album, Diamond. The music video and cover art for the single focused on the sexual themes in the lyrics and the allure of the title character. In writing the song, their guitarist/songwriter Gary Kemp was influenced by American Jewish music with an eastern European flavour that he had heard in movie themes and musicals. Most reviews singled out lead singer Tony Hadley's performance as the main problem with the recording, which only mustered a number 49 peak position on the UK Singles Chart. The poor showing prompted the idea to release another song from the album, but the band realized that getting a new single to succeed would require a remix of the disappointing work of their current producer and decided to discontinue their association with him in doing so.

== Background ==
The first song that was written for Spandau Ballet's sophomore effort Diamond, "Chant No. 1 (I Don't Need This Pressure On)", was their biggest hit to date but gave Gary Kemp writer's block as he tried coming up with more material for the album. He tried copying certain elements of that song for what would be their next single, "Paint Me Down", which, in turn, achieved the lowest peak position on the UK Singles Chart of anything they had released thus far. In his autobiography I Know This Much: From Soho to Spandau, he credited the kind of music that inspired "She Loved Like Diamond", which became the album's third single: "I loved the chord structures and emotionality of American Jewish music, the type that had travelled from eastern Europe and developed into movie themes and musicals."

== Critical reception ==
Spandau Ballet - "She Loved Like Diamond"
Although the song received mostly bad reviews, one critic wrote that it had the best melody on the Diamond album.

Although some critics found elements of "She Loved Like Diamond" appealing, the reviews were not overall favourable and lay most of the blame on Tony Hadley. Sounds magazine's Dave McCullough called it "the worst tune I have ever clapped oversized ears on" and compared his singing to "a Hoover [vacuum cleaner] doing an impersonation of Shirley Bassey." Mark Ellen of Smash Hits described the song as a "soft-shoed lilting shuffle" with "quaintly old-fashioned lyrics" but preferred the instrumental version on the B-side of the 7-inch single because of Hadley's "embarrassing operatic warble". Richard Cook of the New Musical Express described his voice as "absurdly overwrought", pointing out that "unlike Mac or Bono, Hadley has no grasp of the proper use of the vocals of excess". He did, however, admit that the song had "the best melody on the record, placed in the measured electronic setting of the Journeys to Glory era." Record Mirror had varying opinions; in reviewing the single, Sunie Fletcher called it a "pleasant song" that was "at the very least a welcome break away from the funk rut that "Paint Me Down" got stuck in" but thought it had "naively pompous lyrics" and was "remorselessly slaughtered by Tony Hadley's execrable singing." Conversely, when Mike Nicholls reviewed the Diamond album for the magazine, he was more complimentary, calling it "a great 45 with melody to match the, for once, appropriate vocal posing."

In a retrospective review of the Diamond album, Dan LeRoy of AllMusic wrote that the song "offers an inferior trial run at the approach that would produce the global mega-hit 'True' (this version has an underdeveloped melody, which is OK, since still-improving vocalist Tony Hadley wasn't ready yet for a better one)." When the band re-recorded the song for their 2009 album Once More, Paul Lester compared versions in his review of the album for BBC Online, writing that the original was "a radical gesture, a bold foray into John Barry territory" and that the new take on it was "a generic MOR ballad."

== Release and commercial performance ==
"She Loved Like Diamond" was released on 11 January 1982, and only got as high as number 49 on the UK Singles Chart. The number 30 showing of "Paint Me Down" meant that the studio performance of that song that they filmed for the British music chart television programme Top of the Pops went unaired, so it was clear that an appearance there to promote "She Loved Like Diamond" was not going to happen.

== Cover art and music video ==
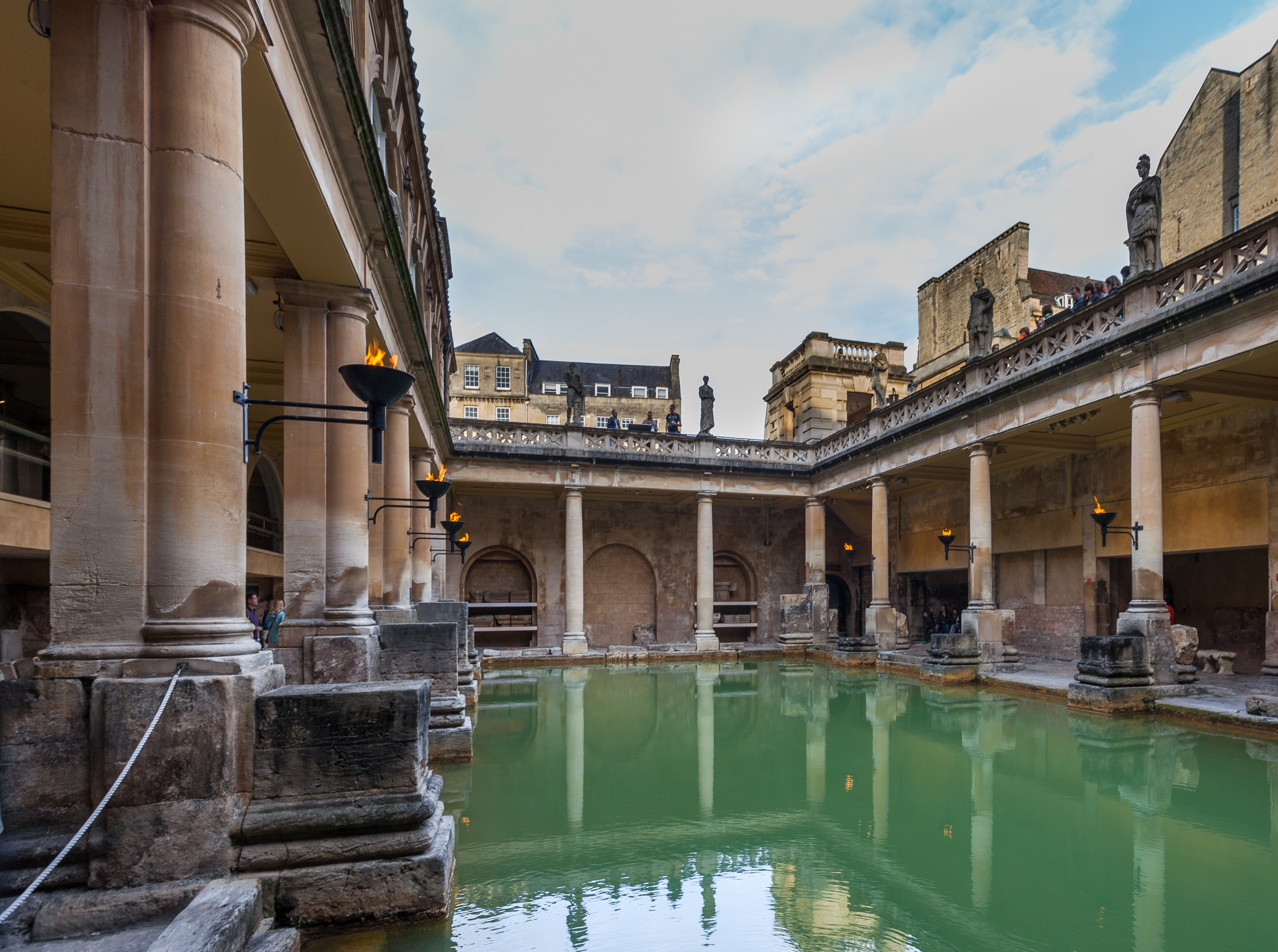
The night scenes in the music video were filmed at the Great Bath at the Roman Baths

Camberwell College of Arts graphics student Graham Smith had designed the covers of Spandau Ballet's first album, Journeys to Glory, and its singles. Whereas those all sported a neoclassical design, his covers for "Chant No. 1" and "Paint Me Down" had a Native American theme, but he gave "She Loved Like Diamond" artwork more in keeping with the sexual topic of the song. The main image shows a close-up of a woman wearing bright red lipstick who is lying down with her naked arms raised up alongside her head. The original drawing, in which her eyes and much of her nose are not visible, is flanked by copies that zoom and crop it in ways that emphasize the bold color outlining her mouth. In the music video for the song, close-ups of the lips of the title character are a recurring motif, and band member Steve Norman portrays an artist working on a sketch of the cover art.

The video was filmed in the English spa town of Bath and features an actress portraying the deceased woman in the song who is shown mainly as a ghost haunting the grounds of a country estate. Prior Park and its Palladian Bridge were used for these scenes in which Hadley mimes the lyrics and the other band members encounter her ghost or recall their relationship with her. Norman sees her spirit in his studio and on the front steps of the mansion. Kemp experiences her hand touching his face but turns to find no one there. Drummer John Keeble sees her image in a drink he spills on a table, and in a flashback bassist Martin Kemp has a romantic encounter with her. During the final chorus Hadley is also shown briefly in the Colonnades under the Empire Hotel and Grand Parade with a fleeting glimpse of the Pulteney Bridge in the background. The closing scenes were shot at the Roman Baths at night. The body of the deceased floats on a coffin-size barge in the Great Bath, and the band members each throw a rose across the water so that it lands on her.

== Aftermath ==
Because the song's number 49 showing was Spandau Ballet's lowest peak position up to that point, Chris Wright, founder of Chrysalis Records, told his employees that the band had fizzled out. The members of the group went into "panic mode", but their manager, Steve Dagger, suggested releasing another song from the Diamond album and thought "Instinction" could be remixed to make it suitable for the singles chart. Because they were disappointed with the work that producer Richard James Burgess had done on the album, they hired Buggles founder Trevor Horn to do the new arrangement of the song. Horn thought the presentation of Hadley's voice on "Paint Me Down" and "She Loved Like Diamond" was unflattering, and once the reworking of "Instinction" began, Hadley was relieved to find that Horn was willing to listen to what he had to say and felt that Horn used the individual strengths of each member to bring out the best in all of them. "Instinction" reached number 10 in the UK. Their next album, True, included the song "Gold", which was another attempt at the eastern European style of music Kemp experimented with on "She Loved Like Diamond".

== Formats and track listings ==
- 7-inch single
1. "She Loved Like Diamond" — 2:55
2. "She Loved Like Diamond" (instrumental) — 2:55
- 12-inch single
1. "She Loved Like Diamond" — 3:37
2. "She Loved Like Diamond" (instrumental) — 2:55

== Personnel ==
Credits adapted from the liner notes for Diamond:

Spandau Ballet

- Tony Hadley – lead vocals and backing vocals
- Gary Kemp – synthesizers, electric guitars, guzheng, backing vocals, horn arrangements
- Martin Kemp – bass, backing vocals
- Steve Norman – bongos, congas, timbales, tablas and backing vocals
- John Keeble – electronic drums

Production

- Richard James Burgess – producer
- Graham Smith – sleeve design

== Charts ==
Chart (1982)	Peak position
UK Singles (OCC)	49

== Bibliography ==
- Gimarc, George (1997). Post Punk Diary, 1980–1982. St. Martin's Press. ISBN 978-0-312-16968-8.
- Hadley, Tony (2004). To Cut a Long Story Short. Sidgwick & Jackson. ISBN 978-0-283-07386-1.
- Kemp, Gary (2009). I Know This Much: From Soho to Spandau. London: Fourth Estate. ISBN 978-0-00-732330-2.
