= Does It Make You Remember =

Single by Kim Carnes

from the album Voyeur
- B-side: "Take It on the Chin"
- Released: October 1982
- Recorded: 1982
- Genre: Rock
- Length: 5:10
- Label: EMI America
- Songwriter(s): Kim Carnes; Dave Ellingson
- Producer(s): Val Garay

Kim Carnes singles chronology
"Voyeur" (1982)	"Does It Make You Remember" (1982)	"Breakin' Away from Sanity" (1982)

Music video
- "Does It Make You Remember" on YouTube

"Does It Make You Remember" is a song by American singer-songwriter Kim Carnes and the second single from her seventh studio album, Voyeur (1982). It was written by Carnes and her husband, David Ellingson, and produced by Val Garay.

The single peaked at No. 36 on the Billboard Hot 100. Critics praised the song for its fusion of ballad and rock styles.

== Critical reception ==
Billboard described "Does It Make You Remember" as "a striking example of the use of harder rock textures in a ballad setting". Cash Box favored "Does It Make You Remember" over its predecessor, "Voyeur", calling it a more "natural-feeling" follow-up to her hit "Bette Davis Eyes" in the previous year. They opined that Val Garay's production "allows the sadness in Carnes' rasp to predominate".

== Music video ==
The music video for "Does It Make You Remember" was directed by Simon Milne.

== Format and track listings ==
7" Single

- A "Does It Make You Remember" (5:10)
- B "Take It on the Chin" (4:30)

== Chart performance ==
Chart (1983)	Peak position
US Billboard Hot 100	36
US Cash Box Top 100	38

== Credits and personnel ==
Credits adapted from the liner notes of Voyeur.

- Kim Carnes – vocals, songwriting
- Val Garay – production, recording engineering
- Niko Bolas – recording assistance
- Richard Bosworth – assistant to Niko
- Doug Sax – mastering (at The Mastering Lab, Los Angeles)
- Josh Leo – electric guitar
- Craig Hull – electric guitar, guitar solo
- Steve Goldstein – keyboard
- Bill Cuomo – synthesizer
- Bryan Garofalo – bass guitar
- Craig Krampf – drums, tambourine, hand saw
- Jerry Peterson – saxphone
- David Ellingson – background vocals, songwriting
- Daniel Moore – background vocals
