= Paint Me Down =

Single by Spandau Ballet

from the album Diamond
- B-side: "Man with Guitar"
- Released: 2 November 1981
- Recorded: 1981
- Genre: New wave
- Length: 3:44 (7" version); 7:06 (12" version); 6:54 ("Re-Paint" (dub) version); 6:22 (Diamond box set version)
- Label: Chrysalis; Reformation
- Songwriter: Gary Kemp
- Producer: Richard James Burgess

Spandau Ballet singles chronology
| "Chant No. 1 (I Don't Need This Pressure On)" (1981) | "Paint Me Down" (1981) | "She Loved Like Diamond" (1982) |

"Paint Me Down" is a song by the English new wave band Spandau Ballet, released on 2 November 1981 as the second single from what would be their second album, Diamond. Their guitarist/songwriter Gary Kemp copied some of the elements of their previous hit, "Chant No. 1 (I Don't Need This Pressure On)", and the conflict between producer Richard James Burgess and lead singer Tony Hadley that began with that song continued as they recorded the vocals for "Paint Me Down". A controversial music video for the song was rejected by the British music chart television programme Top of the Pops, and its number 30 peak position on the UK Singles Chart was not enough to justify airing the studio performance they had filmed for the show either.

== Background ==
As Spandau Ballet's first album, Journeys to Glory, was being completed, the band's guitarist/songwriter Gary Kemp noticed a resurgence of funk in the clubs around Soho that he wanted to emulate in his own songwriting, and an encounter with the British jazz-funk group Beggar and Co led to their collaboration on one of his first attempts to do so, "Chant No. 1 (I Don't Need This Pressure On)". When that song became a number 3 hit in the UK it also put pressure on him to write more hits for their second album. In his autobiography I Know This Much: From Soho to Spandau, he explained how the songs for their debut came much more easily, having been written, re-written and then tested in front of club audiences for months before they were signed to a record label. But as "Chant No. 1" climbed the charts, he suffered from writer's block and decided to copy its use of the Beggar & Co. horns and group vocals on what would be their next single, "Paint Me Down". In a May 1982 interview with New Sounds New Styles magazine, Kemp was asked about the themes of artistry and sensuality in "Paint Me Down" and confirmed that the song was "very sexual".

== Recording ==
"Paint Me Down" was a difficult track for Spandau Ballet lead singer Tony Hadley to record. He recalled, "I just could not get the vocal right. The phrasing was wrong, and I was struggling to sing in tune." He could tell that his bandmates were getting frustrated, and producer Richard James Burgess wanted to try having Hadley lie down in a sort of makeshift tent in the studio with candles lit to help him relax while he was singing. When the rest of the group started performing the chorus, Hadley pointed out to Burgess that their singing was off-key and became even more agitated when Burgess replied, "'It will be fine'".

== Critical reception ==
Spandau Ballet - "Paint Me Down"
The song was described as "all chattering rhythm guitar and popping bass".

The song received a variety of responses from critics. In his review of the 7-inch single, Johnny Black of Smash Hits magazine wrote, "This cringeworthy blooper can barely crawl out of the grooves of its own lethargy." Sunie Fletcher of Record Mirror described it as "the slickest yet of [Kemp's] funk facsimiles and the most sterile; the groove has already become a rut." When "Paint Me Down" was released as part of the Diamond album in 1982 with a separate box set of additional remixes, Richard Cook of the New Musical Express found its remixed version to be something of an improvement: 'Paint Me Down', originally a rather plain and dolorous clap-chant, is stretched on a tightrope between rock and dub, the instruments cued in and out with ironic precision until the morse of the concluding vocals seems to combine with the brass (inverting the customary call and response style) for a climax that has power in reserve." In an otherwise critical review of the original LP, Billboard magazine concluded that "when Spandau is in its element, as on the brilliant 'Chant No. 1' or incessant 'Paint Me Down,' there are few better."

In retrospective reviews on AllMusic, Dan LeRoy described it as a "tuneless single" that was "all chattering rhythm guitar and popping bass", but in dividing the band's oeuvre into "the Funky years and the wimpy ones", Dave Thompson felt that "Paint Me Down" "represented the peak of Spandau's ambition".

== Release and commercial performance ==
Because their previous singles had charted well enough to earn a spot on the British music chart television programme Top of the Pops, the band went into the studios of the show to shoot a performance of "Paint Me Down" before it was released on 2 November 1981, but because the song only peaked at number 30 on the UK Singles Chart, the performance never aired. In his autobiography To Cut a Long Story Short, Hadley confessed, "It was sobering for all of us. However much I had hated the [Diamond] album, I wasn't prepared for ["Paint Me Down"] to flop."

== Music video ==
Spandau Ballet again chose to work with director Russell Mulcahy and decided to combine two genres for the "Paint Me Down" video—the large-scale feel of an epic like they did in the video for "Muscle Bound" and the look of a documentary that would provide a recap of the band's career. Kemp came up with the idea for the latter approach from watching the 1981 UK documentary series Years of Lightning. The band's recent stardom was summarized in "Paint Me Down" using brief clips from the "Muscle Bound" and "Chant No. 1 (I Don't Need This Pressure On)" videos and a documentary for London Weekend Television as well as screen shots of newspaper and magazine clippings that profiled them, which were all tightly edited together. New footage re-enacting their busy schedule was filmed at King's Cross railway station and Heathrow Airport.

The other visual thread for the clip centered around paint. Hadley was filmed lying in bed ostensibly naked for his lip synching segments with, as Kemp described it, "so much paint flying around and so many really quick cuts and edits required [that] Tony had to keep running upstairs to shower himself clean while the technicians changed all the sheets so that we could start again and get it right." Music journalist Paula Yates was scheduled to interview them on the day of the shoot and agreed to appear in the video with a drop of paint running down her back. Kemp heard later that the BBC banned the video because of nudity, but the explanation from Top of the Pops for rejecting it was that it was "too sexually suggestive". "I'm still not sure why they thought it was unsuitable," Hadley wrote in 2009, "unless they were trying to protect viewers from what, to me, was self-indulgent claptrap, in which case I see their point."

The band was in loin cloths for filming at Primrose Hill as the dawn was breaking behind their silhouettes while they smeared paint upon themselves. Another scenario, in which band member Steve Norman was tied to a tree and blindfolded, had a resident of the area concerned enough to call the police because of what they thought might be a satanic ritual in progress.

"Paint Me Down" was filmed in one day for about £10,000, which the band felt would please their record company after the shoot for "Muscle Bound" was prolonged by weather and ran over budget.

== Aftermath ==
The song's number 30 peak came in the middle of recording the Diamond album, and Hadley's frustration mounted because there were so many people in the studio watching him struggle with the songs as they did on "Paint Me Down". Kemp acknowledged that he and Burgess—as songwriter and producer—were to blame for how things were turning out but that Hadley was getting the brunt of it. Hadley lost his temper as they continued recording and was ready to throw a fire extinguisher through the control-room window but stopped himself and left the studio to calm down. Before the album was released, a third single--"She Loved Like Diamond"—also performed poorly, reaching number 49 on the UK Singles chart. The band's manager, Steve Dagger, felt another single should be put out to help sell Diamond, and the track from the album that most resembled a pop song, "Instinction", was remixed and got them back into the top ten.

== Formats and track listings ==
- 7-inch single
1. "Paint Me Down" — 3:44
2. "Man with Guitar" — 2:53
- 12-inch single
1. "Paint Me Down" — 7:06
2. "Re-Paint" — 6:54

== Personnel ==
Credits adapted from the liner notes for Diamond:

Spandau Ballet

- Tony Hadley – lead vocals and backing vocals
- Gary Kemp – synthesizers, electric guitars, guzheng, backing vocals, horn arrangements
- Martin Kemp – bass, backing vocals
- Steve Norman – bongos, congas, timbales, tablas and backing vocals
- John Keeble – electronic drums

Additional musicians

- David "Baps" Baptiste – saxophones and flute
- Nat Augustin – trombone
- Canute "Kenny" Wellington – trumpet
- Beggar & Co – horn arrangements

Production

- Richard James Burgess – producer; horn arrangements
- Graham Smith – sleeve design

== Charts ==
| Chart (1981) | Peak position |
|---|---|
| Luxembourg (Radio Luxembourg) | 22 |
| UK Singles (OCC) | 30 |

== Bibliography ==
- Gimarc, George (1997). Post Punk Diary, 1980–1982. St. Martin's Press. ISBN 978-0-312-16968-8.
- Hadley, Tony (2004). To Cut a Long Story Short. Sidgwick & Jackson. ISBN 978-0-283-07386-1.
- Kemp, Gary (2009). I Know This Much: From Soho to Spandau. London: Fourth Estate. ISBN 978-0-00-732330-2.
