= Voyeur (Kim Carnes album) =

Studio album by Kim Carnes
- Released: September 8, 1982
- Recorded: March 9 – July 13, 1982
- Studios: Record One (Los Angeles) (Note: All tracks except "Undertow"); Hitchings Manor (Note: "Undertow")
- Genres: Synth-pop; new wave; rock
- Length: 37:53
- Label: EMI America
- Producer: Val Garay

Kim Carnes chronology
Mistaken Identity (1981)	Voyeur (1982)	Café Racers (1983)

Singles from Voyeur
- 1. "Voyeur" Released: August 1982; 2. "Does It Make You Remember" Released: November 1982; 3. "Breakin' Away from Sanity" Released: 1982; 4. "Undertow" Released: 1982; 5. "Take It on the Chin" Released: 1982

Voyeur is the seventh studio album by American singer-songwriter Kim Carnes, released on September 8, 1982, by EMI America Records. Carnes began writing material for Voyeur while touring her previous album Mistaken Identity (1981).

Voyeur is a synth-pop album that Carnes described as "more consistent" than its predecessor. It received mixed reviews, with some critics in favor of the album, while others remarked that it failed to live up to the standard of Mistaken Identity, selling less than 300,000 US copies.

== Writing and recording ==
Carnes performed "Say You Don't Know Me" and "Thrill of the Grill" for the first time at The Savoy nightclub in New York on August 25, 1981. She recorded "Say You Don't Know Me" and filmed its accompanying music video in December 1981, a few days before she appeared on the Rod Stewart TV special Tonight He's Yours at The Forum in Inglewood, California.

Rehearsals for the rest of the album began on March 1, 1982, shortly after the 24th Annual Grammy Awards where Kim Carnes had picked up Record of the Year and Song of the Year for "Bette Davis Eyes". The wins gave Carnes and her band a confidence and drive as they continued recording. Carnes described how they wanted to "continue combining the guitar with the synthesizer [and] blending synth with rock 'n roll", taking influence from The Alan Parsons Project, A Flock of Seagulls, Ultravox and Spandau Ballet.

The next track Carnes recorded was "Looker", originally performed by Sue Saad and the Next as the theme for the 1981 Michael Crichton movie of the same name. Carnes played the synth on "Take It on the Chin", a song that she wrote by herself, as she felt there is a "certain feel that can be lost when someone else plays it."

"Breaking Away from Sanity" was originally recorded with synthesizers and drums, but Carnes found it difficult to add her vocal to that mix. She continued: "Finally, after sitting down at the piano one morning, it dawned on me that the whole problem was that it wasn't being played the way it was intended: sitting at the piano with a real stark vocal." A choir of children's voices were added later.

When writing "Voyeur" and "Thrill of the Grill", Carnes carefully considered how these songs would translate into music videos.

Tina Turner recorded a demo of "Undertow" in the mid-1980s.

== Art direction ==
The cover artwork designed by Kosh, Voyeur shows Carnes standing at the bottom of a flight of stairs, with light emanating from a doorway behind her. The background shows industrial pipes pumping out smoke as Carnes looks into the distance. The image was taken by Aaron Rapoport on February 13, 1982.

== Release and promotion ==
Voyeur was released on September 8, 1982, through EMI America. The label released a "talking press kit" to college radio and rural newspapers. It consisted of a 16-minute interview between Carnes and artist development director Clay Baxter, and featured an assortment of photographs. EMI planned a feature-length video of the entire album, directed by Russel Mulcahy, and filmed in London, but the project was ultimately cancelled.

"Voyeur" was released as the lead single in August 1982. It spent a total of twelve weeks on the Billboard Hot 100 chart, peaking at no. 29 for four weeks. Russell Mulcahy directed the song's accompanying music video. MTV would not broadcast it during daytime due to the video's depiction of domestic violence. "Voyeur" charted in several European countries, peaking highest in Norway at no. 5. "Does It Make You Remember" was released as the album's second single in October 1982, with an accompanying video directed by Simon Milne. It reached no. 36 on the Billboard Hot 100. "Breakin' Away from Sanity", "Undertow" and "Take It on the Chin" were released as singles in select territories but none charted. Mulcahy directed another video for "Say You Don't Know Me", but the song was not released as a single.

== Critical reception ==
Professional ratings
Review scores
Source	Rating
AllMusic	2/5 stars
The Encyclopedia of Popular Music	3/5 stars
Sounds	5/5 stars

Billboard noted that Voyeur takes upon "even more of a rock edge" than Mistaken Identity and serves as a "worthy follow-up" to Carnes' previous album. The Windsor Star echoed similar sentiments, describing Voyeur as "a more cohesive statement" that "refines the silky electronic sound" of Mistaken Identity. In the New York Daily News, Hugh Wyatt wrote that Voyeur represents "a departure from [Carnes'] previous middle-of-the-road pop works". Jack Lloyd of The Philadelphia Inquirer described the album as "probably a better, more well-rounded album than Mistaken Identity" featuring "plenty of solid tunes [with a] hard-rock edge". People described Voyeur as an album of "energetic pop rock tunes" with Carnes' "often magnetizing" vocals and "clever" lyrics.

In the Ottawa Citizen, Bill Provick described Voyeur as "tougher, more hard edged and less mainstream" than All Four One by the Motels, another album produced by Val Garay earlier in the year. Provick concluded that Carnes' album is "a strong and satisfying outing by a talented singer". Cash Box noted that the title track blends "a throbbing synth-pop rhythm" with a "mysteriously sensual narrative" similar to that of "Bette Davis Eyes". The Age's Paul Speelman noted the album's use of "staccato lyrics, clever synthesizers [and] steamy conventional instrumentals", highlighting "Breakin' Away from Sanity" as a "stunningly stark presentation". Wayne Robins of Newsday complimented Garay's "crisp" production and the "appealing raspiness" of Carnes' voice. In the Calgary Herald, Roman Cooney described Garay's production as "cooly [sic] effective techno-pop" and the "perfect foil to Carnes' sexy rough-hewn voice".

In a mixed review for The Morning Call, Jane Seigendall described Voyeur as a "rough ride" with "interesting twists, turns and textures". She opined that the album features excessive use of synthesizers and Carnes' "talk-singing" style. The Daily Sentinel opined that "Voyeur" is an "ineffective clone" of "Bette Davis Eyes", though complimented Val Garay's ability to "make the songs shimmer" with his production. In the Winnipeg Sun, Jim Millican wrote that while Voyeur features a number of "energy charged rockers", the album "doesn't capture the imagination quite the same way [as "Bette Davis Eyes"]".

Stephen Thomas Erlewine of AllMusic stated that "the problem with success is following it." He suggested that it would have been difficult to match the success of Carnes' previous album Mistaken Identity, describing the situation as "a shocking performance for an artist that seemed poised for superstar status" after the album underperformed on the charts. He opined that the album followed the same formula as Mistaken Identity, stating that it is hard to determine why Voyeur did not achieve more than it did.

== Impact ==
Voyeur was nominated for Best Female Rock Vocal Performance at the 25th Annual Grammy Awards. French Canadian rapper, Koriass, sampled "Breakin' Away from Sanity" on "J-3000", the opening track from his album La nuit des longs couteaux (2018).

== Track listing ==
Side one
No.	Title	Writer(s)	Length
1.	"Voyeur"	Kim Carnes; Dave Ellingson; Duane Hitchings	4:01
2.	"Looker"	Barry DeVorzon; Michael Towers	5:35
3.	"Say You Don't Know Me"	Carnes	4:12
4.	"Does It Make You Remember"	Carnes; Ellingson	5:10
5.	"Breakin' Away from Sanity"	Carnes; Craig Krampf	2:57

Side two
No.	Title	Writer(s)	Length
6.	"Undertow"	Carnes; Hitchings	4:08
7.	"Merc Man"	Carnes; Ellingson; Hitchings; Krampf	3:32
8.	"The Arrangement"	Dennis Polen	3:48
9.	"Thrill of the Grill"	Carnes	3:23
10.	"Take It on the Chin"	Carnes	4:30
Total length:			37:53

2001 remastered reissue bonus tracks
No.	Title	Writer(s)	Length
11.	"Voyeur" (12" version)	Carnes; Ellingson; Hitchings	5:47
12.	"Dead in My Tracks"	Carnes	4:24
13.	"Still Hold On" (live 8/24/81)	Carnes; Ellingson; Eric Kar; Wendy Waldman	5:32
Total length:			53:36

== Personnel ==
Credits adapted from the liner notes of Voyeur.

=== Musicians ===
- Kim Carnes – vocals (all tracks); background harmonies (track 8); ARP synthesizer (track 10)
- Waddy Wachtel – electric guitars (tracks 1, 7–10); six-string bass (track 1); background vocals (tracks 1, 9)
- Josh Leo – electric guitars (tracks 1–4); background vocals (tracks 2, 9); solo guitar (track 9)
- Duane Hitchings – ARP and Prophet-5 synthesizers (tracks 1, 7); background vocals (track 1); all instruments (track 6)
- Bill Cuomo – Prophet-5 synthesizer (tracks 1, 7, 9, 10); Oberheim OB-X synthesizer (tracks 1, 7, 10); synthesizers (tracks 2–4); background vocals (track 2); piano (track 5)
- Craig Krampf – Oberheim DMX drum programming (tracks 1, 7, 10); background vocals (tracks 1, 9); drums (tracks 2–4, 8, 9); tambourine, hand saw (track 4)
- Dave Ellingson – background vocals (tracks 1–4, 7, 9, 10)
- Daniel Moore – background vocals (tracks 1–4, 7, 9)
- Craig Hull – electric guitars (tracks 2, 3, 9); background vocals (tracks 2, 9); electric guitar solo (tracks 4, 8)
- Steve Goldstein – keyboards (tracks 2–4, 7, 9, 10); background vocals (track 2); organ (track 8)
- Bryan Garofalo – bass (tracks 2–4, 8, 9); background vocals (tracks 2, 9)
- F. Bob Getter – string bass (track 2); background vocals (track 2)
- M.L. Benoit – percussion (tracks 2, 3, 9)
- Jerry Peterson – saxophone (tracks 3, 4, 9)
- Melissa Beaton – children/background vocals (track 5)
- Jeannette Clinger – children/background vocals (track 5)
- Emilie de Azevedo – children/background vocals (track 5)
- Lexy de Azevedo – children/background vocals (track 5)
- Rachel de Azevedo – children/background vocals (track 5)
- Donna Delory – children/background vocals (track 5)
- Collin Ellingson – children/background vocals (track 5)
- Richard Hamilton – children/background vocals (track 5)
- Betty Joyce – children/background vocals (track 5)
- Tim Lamb – children/background vocals (track 5)
- Steve Luczy – children/background vocals (track 5)
- Lu Anne Ponce – children/background vocals (track 5)
- Adam Rue – children/background vocals (track 5)
- Brian Stillwell – children/background vocals (track 5)
- Peter Wade – children/background vocals (track 5)
- Lisa Whitman – children/background vocals (track 5)
- Faith Wong – children/background vocals (track 5)
- Jimmie Haskell – children's background vocals arrangement (track 5)
- Martha Davis – background harmonies (track 8)

=== Technical ===
- Val Garay – production (all tracks); recording (tracks 1–5, 7–10)
- Niko Bolas – recording assistance
- Richard Bosworth – assistant to Niko
- Duane Hitchings – recording (track 6)
- Doug Sax – mastering (at The Mastering Lab, Los Angeles)

=== Artwork ===
- Hollywood Type-Set – typography
- Aaron Rapoport – photography
- Kosh – art direction, design
- Ron Larson – art direction, design

== Charts ==
Chart performance for Voyeur
Chart (1982)	Peak position
Australian Albums (Kent Music Report)	21
Canada Top Albums/CDs (RPM)	26
Dutch Albums (Album Top 100)	37
New Zealand Albums (RMNZ)	26
Norwegian Albums (VG-lista)	12
Swedish Albums (Sverigetopplistan)	18
US Billboard 200	49

== Certifications ==
Certifications for Voyeur
Region	Certification	Certified units/sales
Canada (Music Canada)	Gold	50,000^{^}
^{^} Shipments figures based on certification alone.
