= Voyeur (Kim Carnes song) =

Single by Kim Carnes

from the album Voyeur
- B-side: "Thrill of the Grill"
- Released: August 1982
- Genre: Rock
- Length: 4:01
- Label: EMI America
- Songwriters: Kim Carnes; Dave Ellingson; Duane Hitchings
- Producer: Val Garay

Kim Carnes singles chronology
"Mistaken Identity" (1981)	"Voyeur" (1982)	"Does It Make You Remember" (1982)

Music video
- "Voyeur" on YouTube

"Voyeur" is a song by American singer-songwriter Kim Carnes from her seventh studio album of the same name (1982). Written by Carnes, her husband Dave Ellingson, and Duane Hitchings, the song is an uptempo synth-pop track. It is the first track from the album, and its lead single.

Billboard called it "a rocking synthesized track which is as immediately striking as 'Bette Davis Eyes.'"

"Voyeur" peaked at number 25 on Cash Box's Top 100 Singles and number 29 on the Billboard Hot 100. Internationally, the single reached number 5 in Norway and number 10 in Spain and Sweden. It featured a then-controversial music video, which was later banned for its suggestiveness. The song received a nomination for Best Female Rock Vocal Performance at the 1983 Grammy Awards.

== Track listings ==
- 7-inch single

A. "Voyeur" – 4:01
B. "Thrill of the Grill" – 3:23

== Charts ==
Chart (1982)	Peak position
Australia (Kent Music Report)	30
Canada Top Singles (RPM)	23
New Zealand (Recorded Music NZ)	32
Norway (VG-lista)	5
South Africa (Springbok Radio)	12
Spain (AFYVE)	10
Sweden (Sverigetopplistan)	10
UK Singles (Official Charts)	68
US Billboard Hot 100	29
US Dance Club Songs (Billboard)	52
US Cash Box Top 100	25
West Germany (GfK)	45
Quebec (ADISQ)	7
