= Chant No. 1 (I Don't Need This Pressure On) =

Single by Spandau Ballet

from the album Diamond
- B-side: "Feel the Chant"
- Released: 10 July 1981
- Recorded: 1981
- Studio: Utopia Studios (London)
- Genre: New wave; electro-funk; disco
- Length: 3:58 (7" version); 6:01 (12" version); 8:03 (Diamond box set version)
- Label: Chrysalis; Reformation
- Songwriter: Gary Kemp
- Producer: Richard James Burgess

Spandau Ballet singles chronology
"Muscle Bound" / "Glow" (1981)	"Chant No. 1 (I Don't Need This Pressure On)" (1981)	"Paint Me Down" (1981)

Audio
- "Chant No. 1 (I Don't Need This Pressure On)" on YouTube

"Chant No. 1 (I Don't Need This Pressure On)" is a song by the English new wave band Spandau Ballet, released on 10 July 1981 as the first single from their second album, Diamond. The band's guitarist/songwriter, Gary Kemp, wanted to pay homage to the latest London hotspot, Le Beat Route, by emulating the funk music that was popular there and even using the club as the location for the music video, all in order to show that the band was still part of the trendy Soho scene. Except for the remix of the song from the album's box set, "Chant No. 1" received good reviews, and the 7-inch single became their third top ten hit in the United Kingdom, peaking at number 3 on the UK Singles Chart.

== Background ==
While Spandau Ballet were completing their first album, Journeys to Glory, their guitarist/songwriter Gary Kemp was noticing a renewed interest in funk around Soho, which led him to come up with "Glow", the double A-side companion to "Muscle Bound", the third song released from their debut. He described "Glow" as their first attempt at "American style funk – but still with white lyrics". While promoting the double A-side with performances of "Muscle Bound" in the spring of 1981, the band met up with the British jazz-funk group Beggar and Co, and Kemp noticed the rapport between the two bands and had the idea to ask them to perform as the horn section on an upcoming record. In his autobiography I Know This Much: From Soho to Spandau, he explained, "The conjoining of soul and rock had very little precedent then, and we knew that it would irritate the hell out of the rock press, as well as give us some extended credibility."

The use of horns on "Glow" helped to inspire their next single, "Chant No. 1 (I Don't Need This Pressure On)", which paid tribute to the latest Blitz Kids hangout, Le Beat Route. The club focused on funk music, with one of its most popular songs being "Wheel Me Out" by Was (Not Was), which Kemp felt driven to imitate in his own composing as a means of proving that Spandau Ballet was still in the thick of Soho nightlife. The finished product, "Chant No. 1", even provided some scanty directions to Le Beat Route in the form of a rap that would give Kemp a rare solo vocal. He also credited Robert Elms, who came up with the name of the band, as an inspiration for the song.

== Recording ==
"Chant No. 1" was recorded at Utopia Studios in Primrose Hill with Richard James Burgess producing. Burgess had just developed the Simmons SDSV electronic drum kit, which Spandau Ballet drummer John Keeble used on "Chant No. 1", making it one of the first recordings to use the new alternative to acoustic drums. Kemp described the recording of the music as "fast and easy", but Burgess had trouble getting lead singer Tony Hadley to convey the darker side of the material with a softer tone of voice than usual and eventually succeeded by having him lie down to do so.

== Critical reception ==
"Chant No. 1 (I Don't Need This Pressure On)"
The song was commended for its use of dance rock rhythms and jazz horns.

All three versions of the song received reviews. Red Starr of Smash Hits magazine had some reservations but an overall positive response to the 7-inch single: "Actually this is easily their best effort to date, despite the Pearl and Dean cinema ad beginning and Tony Hadley's pompous foghorn vocals." Starr concluded, "Good dance record and hopefully a sign of better things to come." Record Mirror's Robin Smith wrote, "Even I have to admit that it's a rare classic of its genre." In reviewing the 12-inch single of the song, which was paired with the instrumental version ("Feel the Chant"), Billboard magazine enthused, "What a record!", and proclaimed that the songs were "overwhelming in their inventive use of dance rock rhythms, jazz horns and a total sense of what urban nightlife is all about." When "Chant No. 1" was released as part of the Diamond album in 1982 with a separate box set of additional remixes, however, Richard Cook of the New Musical Express was very critical of the album, especially with regard to the way the songs were remixed: "And 'Chant No. 1', the one Spandau tune to pay tithes direct to disco convention, has the most incisions: a grotesquely doctored trombone on the intro, the sticking groove trick Burgess seems to love, and the beat dissected around the chant much as 'Grandmaster Flash on the Wheels of Steel' confounded any rational dance step."

In retrospective reviews on AllMusic, Dan LeRoy opined that it was the best song on the Diamond album, and Dave Thompson included it on a list of Spandau Ballet songs that were "utterly convincing white boy Funk". When the band re-recorded the song for their 2009 album Once More, Paul Lester called the original "a revolutionary white-funk record" in his review of the album for BBC Online and described the new version as "supper club vamp". In 2009 Dylan Jones put the song in the context of the political climate in England at the time of its release, writing, "'Chant No.1 (I Don't Need This Pressure On)' was, in its own way, as important to the summer of 1981 as 'Ghost Town' by the Specials - a canny mix of contemporary funk and bottom-heavy agitprop, the perfect encapsulation of the new decade's obsession with fiddling while Brixton and Toxteth burned." He also assigned some credit for the success of the record to their drive to stay on top of the trends in dance music: "It is one of the most important records of the early Eighties, and this is not an opinion solely justified by hindsight. Having come fully-formed from the new romantic Billy's/Blitz club scene, Spandau completely understood the currency of the dancefloor, building prime equity in nightclubs from Canvey Island to New Jersey, from Soho to SoHo. And back again." In 2016 the editors of the NME ranked the song at number 38 on their list of the best tracks of 1981.

== Release and commercial performance ==
"Chant No. 1 (I Don't Need This Pressure On)" was released on 10 July 1981, and Kemp recalled taking the 12-inch single to Le Beat Route as soon as they had a copy so that the DJ could start playing it. There they encountered former Blitz regular and up-and-coming Culture Club vocalist Boy George, who "sat in his catty booth [and] admitted to liking it, although he drew the line at dancing."

The song debuted at number 18 on the UK Singles Chart dated 18 July and jumped to number 4 during its second of 11 weeks there. Because copies of the record were selling so quickly, the band thought it was going to be their first number one single and got drunk at the offices of their label, Chrysalis Records, while waiting for the announcement of the singles chart positions for its third week charting, 1 August, which had it peaking at number 3. The British Phonographic Industry awarded the single Silver certification on 1 August for shipment of 250,000 units. The song also reached number 30 in Australia, number 9 in Ireland, number 31 in the Netherlands, number 36 in New Zealand and number 27 in Spain. In the US, the remix included on the 12-inch single of "Chant No. 1" got as high as number 17 on Billboard magazine's Disco Top 100.

== Music video ==
Spandau Ballet continued to work with "Muscle Bound" director Russell Mulcahy on "Chant No. 1", and the video was filmed at Le Beat Route with the band performing the song on the dance floor instead of the stage. Kemp described Hadley's character as "a strung-out lounge lizard" who drives through Soho to the club and is greeted by the owner before entering to take the mike. During the bridge, shots of the club's television set showed a Muhammad Ali fight, and flashes of a picture of Lenin were intercut with its owner, DJ Steve Lewis, which Kemp suggested because he wanted Lewis to lip sync his rap solo and thought the photo would convey the DJ's political leanings.

== Aftermath ==
The video for "Chant No. 1" was included on a tape from the music video subscription service RockAmerica, and Frankie Crocker, a disc jockey for WBLS in New York City, saw it on a video screen at The Ritz and started playing the song on his show. A couple of other urban contemporary stations in the US also added it their playlists, which gave the band hope that Chrysalis would release it as a single there. An executive for the label told them, "The thing is, guys, it’s black radio. It won’t cross over into pop," and Kemp thought, "What he wanted to say was it wasn't proper radio and wouldn't be heard by white kids with cash." One consolation for this disappointment the band received came in the form of a message from the Clash, who contacted their office to let them know that "they thought the record was amazing."

The song's success put pressure on Kemp to come up with more hits for what would be their sophomore effort, Diamond. He wrote, "Unlike second marriages, second albums are notoriously difficult. Journeys had been developed over some time and played live before we went into the recording studio, with some songs being discarded at the last minute. It was a mission statement, cohesive and tight, with none of the indulgence that often plagues follow-ups." He initially thought "Chant No. 1" would inspire more music, but as it climbed the singles chart, he described the effect it had on him as "a fear and a darkness clouding my direction." Spandau Ballet's next single, "Paint Me Down", only got as high as number 30 on the UK Singles Chart.

In 2001, Billboard magazine credited the band with giving London-based DJ/producer/remixer Rui Da Silva the honor of becoming the first Portuguese to reach number one on the UK Singles Chart. His song "Touch Me" originally had a section inspired by "Chant No. 1", but the band had too many demands to be met to allow him to include what Kemp had written and caused a delay in its release. The planned release would have put the song in direct competition with the children's television theme song "Can We Fix It?" by Bob the Builder, which was the biggest-selling single of the year in the UK and spent three weeks at number one, but the delay caused by the failed negotiations instead resulted in the Da Silva hit's movement up the chart coinciding with the theme song's waning popularity.

== Formats and track listings ==
- 7-inch single
1. "Chant No. 1 (I Don't Need This Pressure On)" – 3:58
2. "Feel the Chant" – 3:57
- 12-inch single
1. "Chant No. 1 (I Don't Need This Pressure On)" – 6:01
2. "Feel the Chant" – 6:01

== Personnel ==
Credits adapted from the liner notes for Diamond, except as noted:

Spandau Ballet

- Tony Hadley – lead vocals and backing vocals
- Gary Kemp – synthesizers, electric guitars, guzheng, backing vocals, horn arrangements
- Martin Kemp – bass, backing vocals
- Steve Norman – bongos, congas, timbales, tablas and backing vocals
- John Keeble – electronic drums

Additional musicians

- David "Baps" Baptiste – saxophones and flute
- Nat Augustin – trombone
- Canute "Kenny" Wellington – trumpet
- Beggar & Co – horn arrangements

Production

- Richard James Burgess – producer; horn arrangements
- Graham Smith – sleeve design

== Charts ==
Chart performance for "Chant No. 1 (I Don't Need This Pressure On)"
Chart (1981)	Peak position
Australia (Kent Music Report)	30
Ireland (IRMA)	9
Luxembourg (Radio Luxembourg)	1
Netherlands (Single Top 100)	31
New Zealand (Recorded Music NZ)	36
Spain (AFYVE)	27
UK Singles (Official Charts)	3
US Dance Club Songs (Billboard)	17

== Certifications ==
Certifications for "Chant No. 1 (I Don't Need This Pressure On)"
Region	Certification	Certified units/sales
United Kingdom (BPI)	Silver	250,000^{^}
^{^} Shipments figures based on certification alone.

== Bibliography ==
- Dean, Matt (2011). The Drum: A History. United States: Scarecrow Press. ISBN 978-0-810-88170-9.
- Gimarc, George (1997). Post Punk Diary, 1980–1982. St. Martin's Press. ISBN 978-0-312-16968-8.
- Hadley, Tony (2004). To Cut a Long Story Short. Sidgwick & Jackson. ISBN 978-0-283-07386-1.
- Kemp, Gary (2009). I Know This Much: From Soho to Spandau. London: Fourth Estate. ISBN 978-0-00-732330-2.
- Kent, David (1993). Australian Chart Book 1970–1992 (illustrated ed.). St Ives, N.S.W.: Australian Chart Book. ISBN 0-646-11917-6.
