= Beggar and Co =

British jazz-funk group

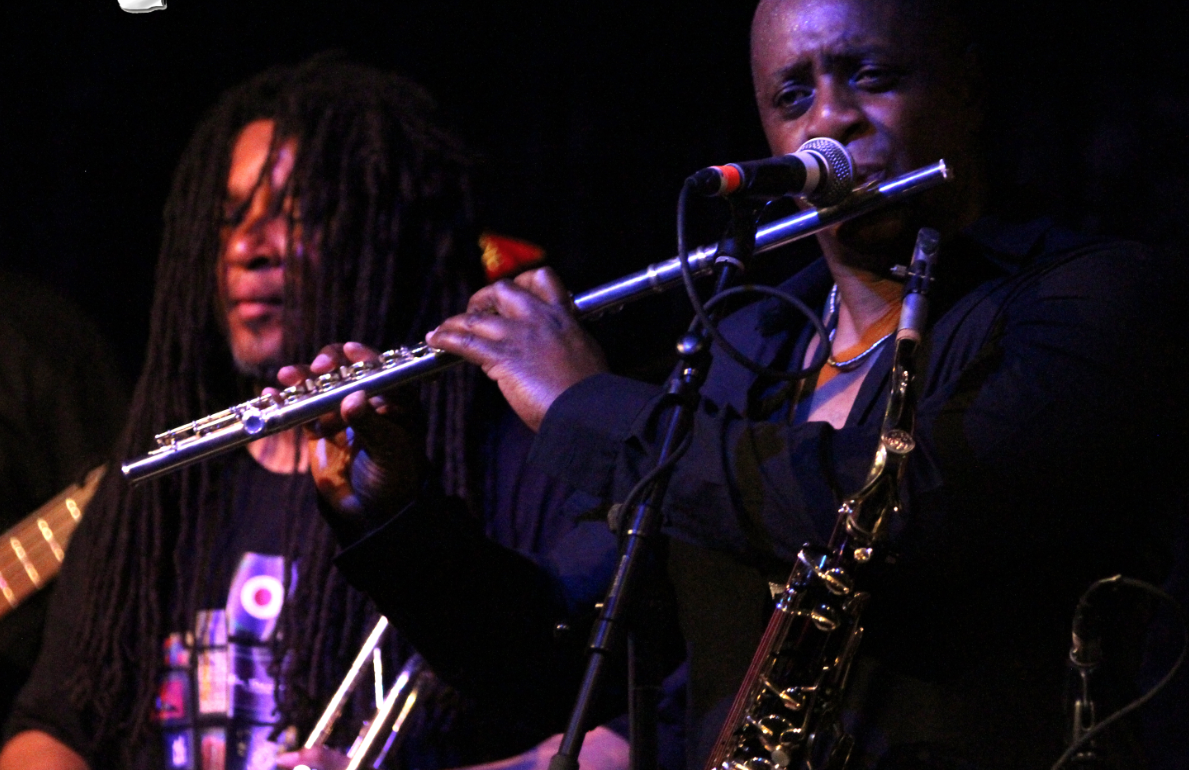

Background information
- Origin: United Kingdom
- Genres: Pop, jazz-funk, soul
- Years active: 1980–present
- Labels: Ensign, RCA
- Members: Kenny Wellington (trumpet, flugelhorn, vocals); David Baptiste (saxophones, flute, vocals); Breeze McKrieth (guitar, vocals)

Beggar and Co (also written Beggar & Co) are a British jazz-funk group formed by Kenny Wellington, David Baptiste and Neville 'Breeze' McKrieth, originally members of the group Light of the World.

== Overview ==
Beggar and Co's first single was "(Somebody) Help Me Out", which entered the chart on 7 February 1981. It peaked at number 15 and spent a total of ten weeks on the UK Singles Chart. Their second release was "Mule (Chant No.2)", which entered the UK Singles Chart on 12 September 1981, and reached number 37, remaining in the chart for five weeks.

Beggar and Co was also the featured brass section on a number of chart records for other artists, both as a horn section or as individual musicians. Recorded studio sessions included Spandau Ballet's hit single, "Chant No. 1 (I Don't Need This Pressure On)". In 2007, the band released a live recording from The Jazz Cafe, Brass, Strings N' Things.

Since 2016, Breeze McKrieth, Kenny Wellington, David Baptiste became part of a performing and recording collective, incorporating original members of Beggar & Co, Hi Tension and other members of bands from the genre to be known under the collective umbrella as the Brit Funk Association, performing material from the different repertoires of each band and releasing two albums Full Circle in 2018 and Lifted in 2020. In 2021 the band released the self titled album Beggar & Co on Expansion Records.

== Discography ==
=== Studio albums ===
- Monument (1981)
- Sleeping Giants (2012) (Featuring the Funk Jazz Collective)
- Beggar & Co (2021)

=== Singles ===
Year	Title	Label	UK
1981	"Mule (Chant No. 2)"	RCA	37
1981	"(Somebody) Help Me Out"	Ensign	15
1981	"We All Work Out / Got to Get Away"	RCA	—
1983	"Anybody See My Trial"	Polydor	—
1986	"Life"	Total Control	—
"—" denotes releases that did not chart or were not released.
