= Invicta =

Invicta (Latin for "unvanquished") may refer to:

== Companies ==
- Invicta (company), an Italian outdoor equipment manufacturer
- Invicta Bus Services, a bus operator in Melbourne, Australia
- Invicta International Airlines, a UK charter airline from 1965 to 1982
- Invicta Watch Group, a Florida-based watch company
- Invicta Plastics, a British plastic business; holder of the rights to Mastermind

== Places ==
- Porto, also known as the cidade invicta (unvanquished city)
- Invicta Park Barracks, a military installation in Maidstone, Kent
- Invicta Grammar School, academy in Maidstone, Kent, England

== Music ==
- Invicta (Hit the Lights album), 2012
- Invicta (The Enid album), 2012
- Radio Invicta (London), a 1970s/1980s pirate radio station in London
- Radio 390 (formerly Invicta), a 1960s offshore radio station
- Invicta Radio (now Heart Kent), a licensed radio station in Kent

== Transportation ==
- Invicta (car), a British make of car
- Buick Invicta, a car made by American manufacturer Buick from 1959 to 1963, and 2008 concept car
- Invicta (locomotive), an early steam locomotive
- SS Invicta, a number of ships with this name
- Invicta (sailboat), a fibreglass hulled sailboat

== Related to the English county of Kent ==
- Invicta (motto), motto of the county of Kent, England
- White horse of Kent, also known as Invicta, the prancing horse symbol
- List of organisations in Kent named Invicta

== Sports ==
- Invicta Ground, a former football stadium in Plumstead, England, closed ca. 1894
- Invicta Fighting Championships, an American mixed martial arts organization focused on female fighters
- Invicta Racing, British auto racing team owned by Invicta Watch Group
- Kent Invicta, a defunct rugby team
- Maidstone Invicta, founding name of Maidstone United Football Club
- Folkestone Invicta, a football club based in Folkestone, Kent

== See also ==
- Invicta Flag, alternate name for the Flag of Kent
- Cidade Invicta, alternate name for Porto, a city in Portugal
- Città Invicta, alternate name for Senglea, a city in Malta
- Solenopsis invicta, the scientific name for the red imported fire ant
- Semper Invicta, the motto of Warsaw, Poland
- Invictus (disambiguation)
- Radio Invicta (disambiguation)
- Unvanquished (disambiguation)
