= List of organisations in Kent named Invicta =

Invicta, Latin for undefeated or unconquered, is the motto of the English county of Kent, appearing on the coat of arms of Kent County Council. It is also used in the names of several Kent based organisations or other entities:

Radio

- Invicta Sound, Invicta Radio and Invicta FM, all former names/brands of the Independent Local Radio station which covered the county from 1984, being renamed/branded in 2009 as Heart Kent
- Radio Invicta, a former name of KING Radio which became Radio 390, a former 1960s/1970s pirate radio station which broadcast from a former British Army Maunsell Fort off the coast of Whitstable
- Radio Invicta (London Pirate Station), a former 1960s pirate radio station which had a Kent postal address, but broadcast across London from various tower blocks

Schools

- Invicta Grammar School, a girls' grammar school in Maidstone
- Invicta Primary School in Blackheath, London, formerly part of Kent

Youth Organisations

- Invicta Scout Group, based in Chislehurst.

Sports

- Invicta Kent Autograss Club, a member of the National Autograss Sport Association, organizing grass track motor racing at Ivychurch, Romney Marsh
- Invicta Dynamos, the men's ice hockey team in Gillingham
- Invicta Dynamics, the women's ice hockey team in Gillingham
- Folkestone Invicta F.C., a football club based in Folkestone
- Invicta Water Polo, a National League team based in the county
- Kent Invicta RLFC, a defunct English rugby league team
- Kent Invicta Football League, an amateur football league in Kent
- Invicta Cricket Coaching, a cricket coaching company based in Kent

Transport

- Invictaway, a brand name for the London commuter coach operations of Maidstone & District Motor Services, a former operator whose local bus operations covered much of West Kent bounded roughly by the Medway Towns, Tunbridge Wells, and Ashford
- Invicta International Airlines, a charter airline which operated from Manston Airport in Thanet, from 1965 to 1982

Other

- Swanley Invicta 305, a branch of The Loyal Order of Moose in Great Britain, a fraternal and service organisation, who meet in Swanley
- Kent Invicta Chamber of Commerce, chamber of commerce covering Kent and Medway.

== See also ==
- Invicta Ground, a former football stadium in Plumstead (south east London, formerly part of Kent), home of Arsenal F.C. from 1890 to 1893
- Flag of Kent, sometimes referred to as the Invicta Flag
- White horse of Kent, a symbol closely associated with Kent, sometimes referred to as Invicta
