= Unvanquished =

Unvanquished or The Unvanquished may refer to:

- The Unvanquished, a 1938 novel by William Faulkner
- The Unvanquished (1956 film) or Aparajito, an Indian Bengali-language film
- The Unvanquished (film), a 1964 French film noir
- "Unvanquished" (Caprica), a 2010 television episode
- Unvanquished (video game), a 2012 first-person shooter

== See also ==
- Unvanquished City, a 1950 Polish film
- Unconquered (disambiguation)
- Undefeated (disambiguation)
- Invicta (disambiguation)
- Invictus (disambiguation)
