= Vindicta =

Vindicta may refer to:

- Vindicta (film), a 2023 American slasher film
- Vindicta (2026 film), a film featuring Anna Madeley, Sam Hazeldine, and Pip Torrens
- "Vindicta" (NCIS: New Orleans), a 2019 television episode

== See also ==
- Vindicta Salvatoris (English: The Avenging of the Saviour or The Vengeance of the Saviour), a text of New Testament Apocrypha
- Vindictus, a free-to-play massively multiplayer online role-playing game (MMORPG)
- Invictus (disambiguation)
- Invicta (disambiguation)
