= British pop music =

Popular music, produced commercially in the United Kingdom

British pop music is popular music, produced commercially in the United Kingdom. It emerged in the mid-to late 1950s as a softer alternative to American rock 'n' roll. Like American pop music it has a focus on commercial recording, often orientated towards a youth market, as well as that of the Singles Chart usually through the medium of relatively short and simple love songs. While these basic elements of the genre have remained fairly constant, pop music has absorbed influences from most other forms of popular music, particularly borrowing from the development of rock music, and utilising key technological innovations to produce new variations on existing themes. From the British Invasion in the 1960s, led by The Beatles, British pop music has alternated between acts and genres with national appeal and those with international success that have had a considerable impact on the development of the wider genre and on popular music in general.

== Early British popular music ==
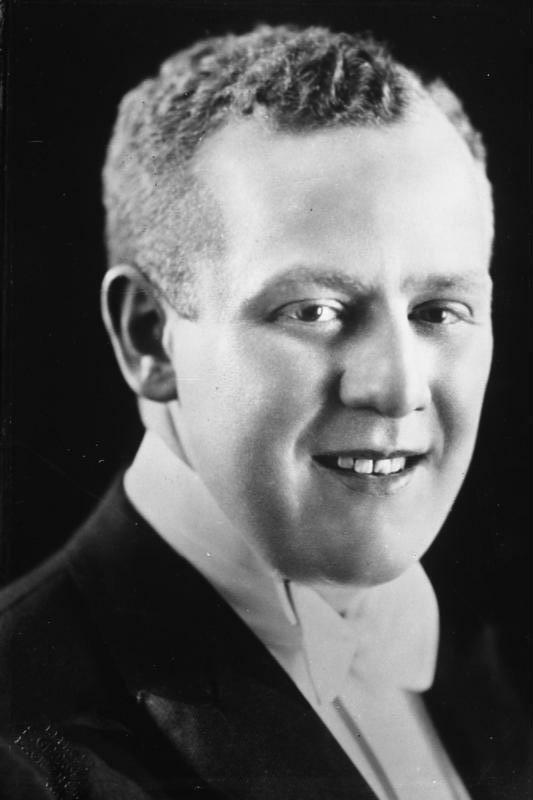
Jack Hylton, c. 1930

Early British popular music, in the sense of commercial music enjoyed by the people, arose in the sixteenth and seventeenth centuries with the arrival of the broadside ballad, which were sold cheaply and in great numbers until the nineteenth century. Further technological, economic and social changes led to new forms of music in the nineteenth century, including parlour music and the brass band, which produced a popular and communal form of classical music. Similarly, the music hall sprang up to cater for the entertainment of new urban societies, adapting existing forms of music to produce popular songs and acts. In the 1930s the influence of American jazz and swing music led to the creation of British dance bands, who provided a social and popular music that began to dominate social occasions and the radio airwaves.

== Traditional pop, skiffle and rock 'n' roll 1950–1962 ==
In the early 1950s sales of American records dominated British popular music. In the first full year of the charts in 1953 major artists were Perry Como, Guy Mitchell and Frankie Laine largely with orchestrated sentimental ballads, beside novelty records like "(How Much Is) That Doggie in the Window?" re-recorded by British artist Lita Roza. Some established British wartime stars like Vera Lynn were still able to chart into the mid-1950s, but successful new British acts like Jimmy Young who had two number one hits in 1955, did so with re-recorded versions of American songs "Unchained Melody" and "The Man from Laramie" or Alma Cogan with "Dreamboat". Many successful songs were the product of movies, including number ones for Doris Day in 1954 with "Secret Love" from Calamity Jane and for Frank Sinatra with the title song from Three Coins in the Fountain.

A notable British musical genre of the mid-1950s was skiffle, which was developed primarily by jazz musicians copying American folk and country blues songs such as those of Lead Belly in a deliberately rough and lively style emulating jug bands. The most prominent exponent was Lonnie Donegan, whose version of "Rock Island Line" was a major hit in 1956. The success of the skiffle craze, and the lack of a need for expensive instruments or high levels of musicianship, encouraged many working class British males to start their own groups. It has been estimated that in the late 1950s there were 30–50,000 skiffle groups in Britain. Sales of guitars grew rapidly and other musicians were able to perform on improvised bass and percussion in venues such as church halls and cafes, without having to aspire to musical perfection or virtuosity.

At the same time, rock and roll was played in Britain after 1955. The British product has generally been considered less successful than the American version of the genre at the time, and made very little international or lasting impact. However, it was important in establishing British youth and popular music culture and was a key factor in subsequent developments that led to the British Invasion of the mid-1960s. Since the 1960s some stars of the genre, most notably Cliff Richard, have managed to sustain very successful pop careers and there have been periodic revivals of this form of music.

== Beat and the British Invasion 1963–1969 ==
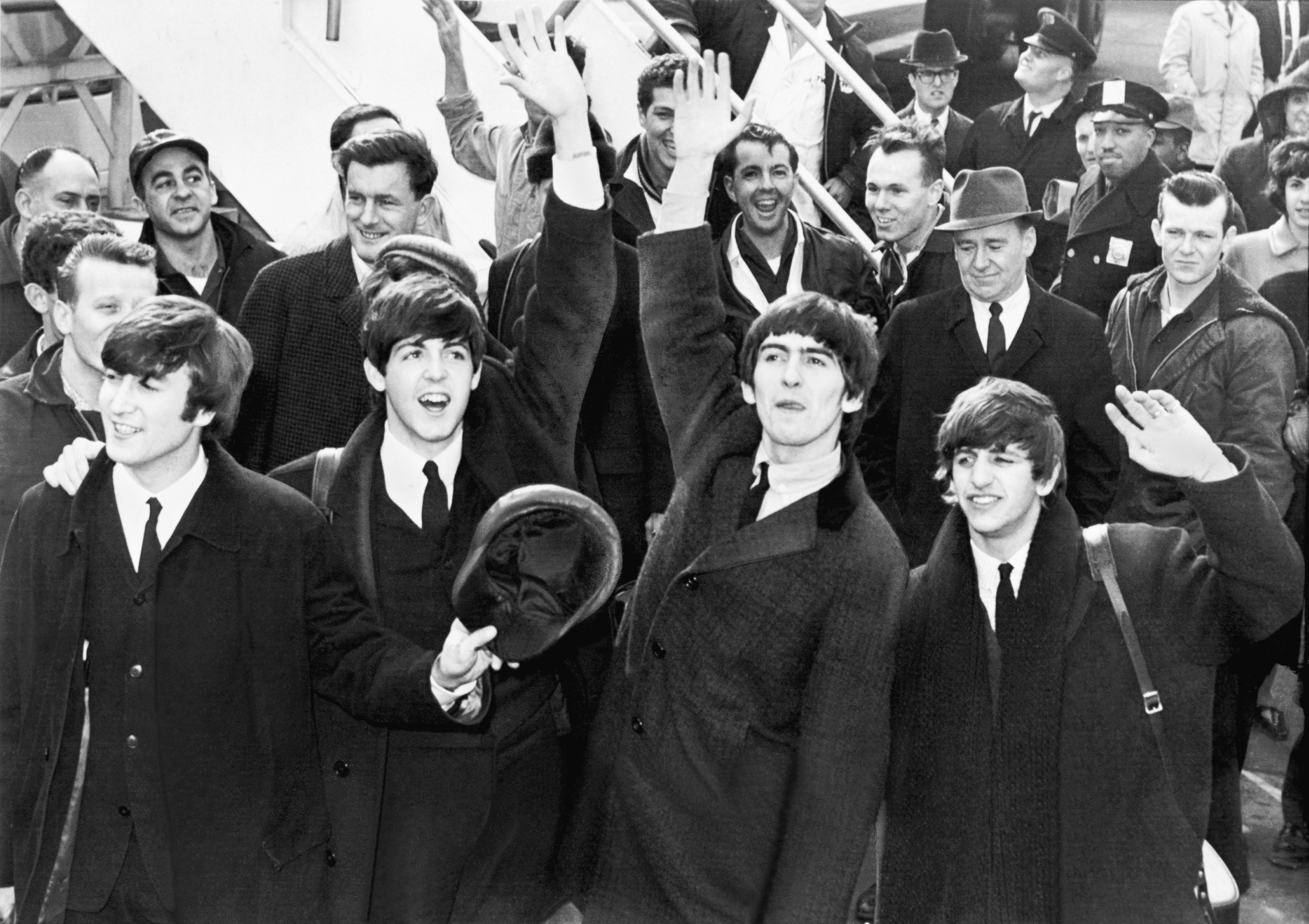
The arrival of The Beatles in the U.S., and subsequent appearance on The Ed Sullivan Show, marked the start of the British Invasion.

In the late 1950s, a flourishing culture of groups began to emerge, often out of the declining skiffle scene, in major urban centres in the UK like Liverpool, Manchester, Birmingham and London. This was particularly true in Liverpool, where it has been estimated that there were around 350 different bands active, often playing ballrooms, concert halls and clubs. Beat bands were heavily influenced by American bands of the era, such as Buddy Holly and the Crickets (from which group The Beatles derived their name), as well as earlier British groups such as The Shadows. After the national success of the Beatles in Britain from 1962, a number of Liverpool performers were able to follow them into the singles charts, including Gerry & The Pacemakers, The Searchers, and Cilla Black. Among the most successful beat acts from Birmingham were The Spencer Davis Group and The Moody Blues. From London, the term Tottenham Sound was largely based around The Dave Clark Five, but other London bands that benefited from the beat boom of this era included the Rolling Stones and The Yardbirds. The first non-Liverpool, non-Brian Epstein-managed band to break through in the UK were Freddie and the Dreamers, who were based in Manchester, as were Herman's Hermits and The Hollies.

The British Invasion of America led by the Beatles from their arrival in February 1964 saw them, uniquely, hold the top five positions on the Billboard Hot 100 singles chart simultaneously. During the next two years, Peter and Gordon, The Animals, Manfred Mann, Petula Clark, Freddie and the Dreamers, Wayne Fontana and the Mindbenders, Herman’s Hermits, The Rolling Stones, The Troggs, and Donovan would have one or more number one singles. Other acts that were part of the invasion included The Dave Clark Five, Tom Jones, The Kinks and The Who At this point most of the British Invasion bands did not distinguish their rock 'n' roll or blues based music from pop music. However, around 1967 as blues-rock acts, emerging folk rock and some beat bands, including the Beatles, veered towards a more serious forms of music (with an emphasis on meaning, virtuosity and orientated towards the albums market), the term pop music began to be applied to rock and roll based music with more commercial aims, often with inconsequential lyrics, particularly simple love songs, and orientated towards the singles chart, continuing the path of traditional pop. Although some bands occupied territory that crossed the emerging rock/pop divide and were able to produce successes in both camps, including the Beatles and Rolling Stones, the British pop genre in the late 1960s would be dominated by individual singers like Sandie Shaw.

== Band pop, punk and new wave 1970–1978 ==
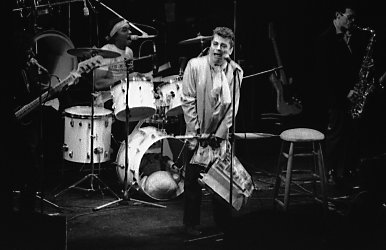
Ian Dury and the Blockheads on stage

The early 1970s were probably the era when British pop music was most dependent on the group format, with pop acts, like rock bands, playing guitars and drums, with the occasional addition of keyboards or orchestration. Some of these groups were in some sense "manufactured", but many were competent musicians, playing on their own recordings and writing their own material. Some of the technically more impressive groups who enjoyed number one hits in the UK were 10cc, Status Quo and Mungo Jerry. Aiming much more for the teen market, partly a response to the Osmonds were The Rubettes and The Bay City Rollers.

British soul and disco enjoyed mainstream popularity during this era, with artists such as the Bee Gees, Biddu, Carl Douglas, Tina Charles, and Jimmy James. The 1974 hit "Kung Fu Fighting" (by Carl Douglas and Biddu) in particular sold eleven million records worldwide. Liverpool's The Real Thing, a group which had developed from a Merseybeat doo-wop act called The Chants (said to be the only group ever to be backed by The Beatles), had nine Top 40 hits in the late 1970s, including number one "You to Me Are Everything" in 1976, with their records re-charting a decade later via a number of remixes and their 1977 song "Love's Such a Wonderful Thing" becoming a known on the early 2000s French touch scene thanks to it being sampled by Thomas Bangalter and DJ Falcon.

Largely vocal-based groups included the New Seekers, Brotherhood of Man, the last of these designed as a British answer to ABBA. In addition there were the rock and roll revivalists Showaddywaddy, Mud and Alvin Stardust. Individuals who enjoyed successful pop careers in this period included Gilbert O'Sullivan, David Essex, Leo Sayer and Rod Stewart.

Perhaps the most unusual British development in pop was glam or glitter rock, characterised by outrageous clothes, makeup, hairstyles, and platform-soled boots. The flamboyant lyrics, costumes, and visual styles of glam performers were a campy playing with categories of sexuality in a theatrical blend of nostalgic references to science fiction and old movies, all over a guitar-driven hard rock sound. Pioneers of the genre included Marc Bolan with his band T. Rex and Mott the Hoople, while 1960s acts like Shane Fenton and The N'Betweens joined the scene, re-branding themselves as Alvin Stardust and Slade respectively. These, and many other acts including Queen and Elton John, straddled the divide between pop and rock music, managing to maintain a level of respectability with rock audiences, while enjoying success in the singles chart. Other performers aimed much more directly for the popular music market, where they were the dominant acts of their era. Acts enjoying many hits in this period included The Sweet, Gary Glitter and The Glitter Band, with the last two pushing the glitter image to its limits. British acts mixing art pop with glam (the 'arthouse glam' crowd) included David Bowie, Roxy Music and Sparks (then a British-based band featuring three Brits and the Maels, a couple of Anglophile brothers from the Californian band Halfnelson, who would become important in the development of synthpop in the late 1970s). A scene most popular in the United Kingdom, glam rock peaked during the mid-1970s, before it disappeared in the face of punk and new wave trends.

The initial impact of punk on pop music, even when not banned from the charts, was not overwhelming, but by the end of the decade the British pop music industry was becoming dominated by post-punk new wave acts like Ian Dury and the Blockheads. Other successful new wave pop bands included XTC, Squeeze and Nick Lowe, as well as songwriters like Elvis Costello, rock & roll influenced bands like the Pretenders, and the reggae influenced music of bands like The Police. By the end of the decade, many of these bands, most obviously the Police, were beginning to make an impact in American and world markets.

== New Romantic and the second British Invasion 1979–1985 ==
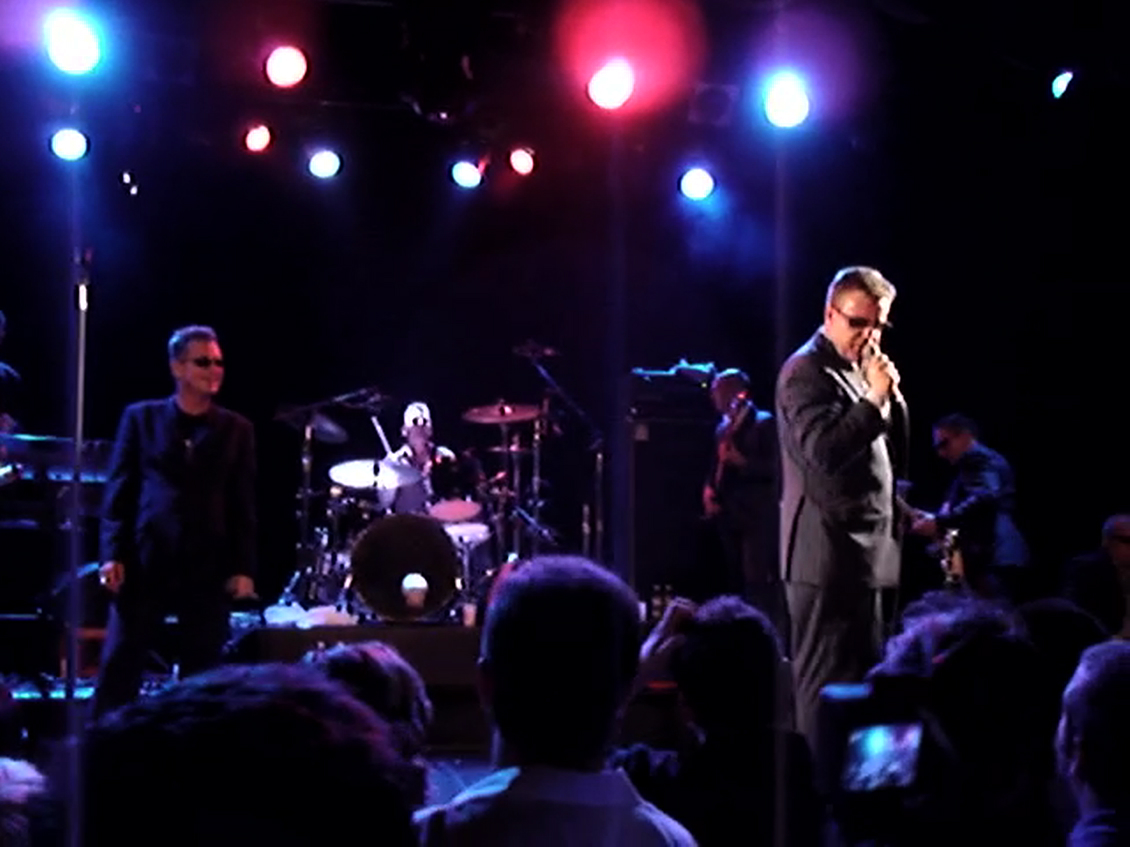
Madness on stage in 2005

Having emerged from the post-punk and reggae scenes in the West Midlands in the 1970s, the ska revival associated with 2 Tone records was a remarkable commercial success in the early years of the 1980s. Bands like The Specials, The Selecter, The Beat, Madness, Bad Manners and The Bodysnatchers all enjoyed chart success, with Madness and The Specials managing number ones. The Specials' "Ghost Town" (1981) is often seen as summarizing the disillusionment of Thatcherite, post-industrial urban youth. Madness managed to sustain a career that could still chart into the second half of the 1980s, but the 2-Tone movement faded early in the decade, and would have a longer-term impact through American bands of the third wave of ska. The more reggae based music of UB40 allowed them to continue to chart in to the twenty first century, enjoying four number ones in the UK, the last of these in 1994.

The New Romantics emerged as the dominant force in the singles charts at the beginning of the 1980s, overtaking new wave music. Emerging originally in London nightclubs including Billy's and The Blitz Club towards the end of the 1970s and influenced by David Bowie and Roxy Music, it further developed glam rock fashions, gaining its name from the frilly fop shirts of early Romanticism. Among the commercially most successful acts associated with the movement were Adam and the Ants, Spandau Ballet and Duran Duran.

Key figures of the New Romantic scene included Boy George, Steve Strange, Marilyn and Australian performance artist Leigh Bowery, all of whom would go on to have music careers over the next two decades in bands like Culture Club, Visage and Minty. 'Gender bending' became a trend that even the more conservative American media noticed, with Newsweek magazine featuring Annie Lennox and Boy George on the cover of one of its issues, and Rolling Stone having an England Swings issue. In this period Stock Aitken Waterman would team up with Divine to produce "You Think You're a Man" (written by Modern Romance's Geoff Deane), a Hi-NRG pop record which would be their first UK Top 75 chart hit.

In the late 1970s and early 1980s Hi-NRG (hi energy disco) had become popular in the gay scenes of American cities like New York and San Francisco. In 1983 in the UK, music magazine Record Mirror championed the gay underground sound and began publishing a weekly Hi-NRG Chart. Hi-NRG also entered the mainstream with hits in the UK singles chart, such as Hazell Dean's "Searchin' (I Gotta Find a Man)" and Evelyn Thomas's "High Energy".

By about 1983, the original New Romantic movement had dissolved with surviving acts dropping most of the fashion elements to pursue mainstream careers. New Romantic music often made extensive use of synthesizers, merging into synthpop, which followed European pioneers like Kraftwerk, Jean Michel Jarre, and Tangerine Dream. Tubeway Army, a little known outfit from West London, dropped their punk rock image and topped the UK charts in 1979 with the single "Are Friends Electric?", prompting their singer, Gary Numan to go solo and release the album, The Pleasure Principle from which he gained a number one in the single charts with "Cars", and which much to popularise the synthpop sound. Trevor Horn of The Buggles captured the changing scene in the international hit "Video Killed the Radio Star". New Romantic acts that made extensive use of synthesizers included Visage, Ultravox, Duran Duran and Japan.

Around the start of the decade, experimental, alternative and avant-garde acts like New Order, Orchestral Manoeuvres in the Dark, The Human League, Depeche Mode and Soft Cell would emerge from grim, industrial parts of high-rise Britain. Even though they were all alternative electronic acts on independent labels (Factory, Fast, Mute and Some Bizzare) in time they would all end up in the pages of Smash Hits as synthpop became playlisted on BBC Radio 1 and on various children's TV shows like the Wide Awake Club. Some of these acts would continue down a purer pop route, such as Orchestral Manoeuvres in the Dark (which featured Andy McCluskey, who became the 1990s pop svengali behind Atomic Kitten), whilst others became darker and more industrial, as in the case of Depeche Mode, who became a major alternative rock stadium-filler in the 1990s. Other key artists from the first wave of synthpop include Eurythmics, Talk Talk, Thomas Dolby, Bronski Beat, Heaven 17 and Blancmange.

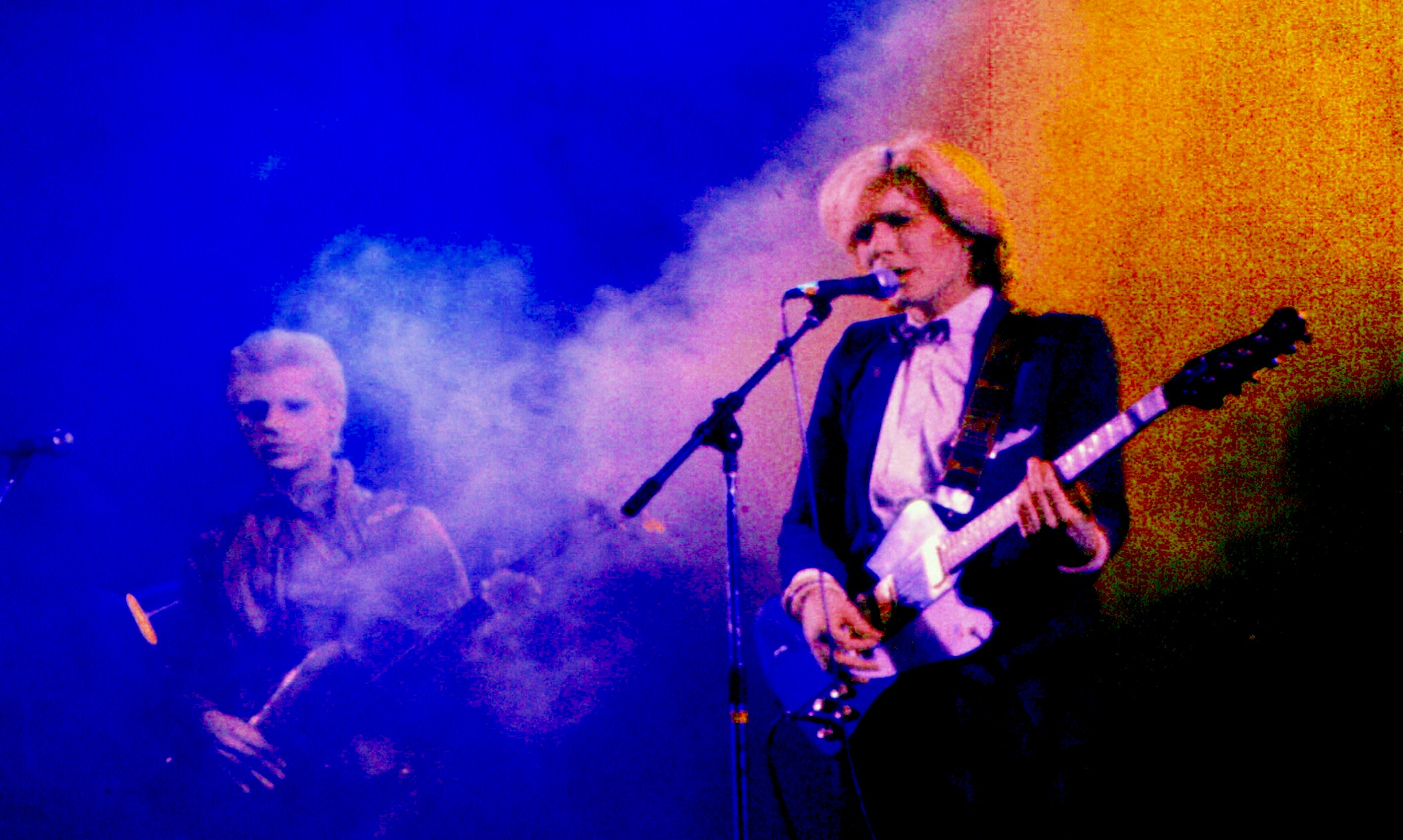
David Sylvian (right) of Japan onstage in 1979

The British charts at the opening of the 1980s were dominated by a mix of imports, novelty acts, megamixes, rock and roll revivalists (including Shakin' Stevens) and long-term careerists like Queen and Cliff Richard, but there were also more conventional pop acts, including Bucks Fizz, who had three number ones after their Eurovision Song Contest victory in 1981 and the Trevor Horn produced duo Dollar

From its inception in 1981, the American version of MTV featured a disproportionate amount of music videos from image-conscious British acts. British record companies such as Virgin Records put money into making inventive videos for their new wave acts, where other genres and bigger artists are just represented by live or in-studio performances. This resulted in MTV having to use the video archive of many of these British record companies (when videos for a lot of the big Billboard chart hits did not exist), giving UK acts a large amount of exposure over in the States.

In the autumn of 1982, "I Ran (So Far Away)" by A Flock of Seagulls entered the Billboard Top Ten, arguably the first successful song that owed almost everything to its video being played on MTV, though in the United Kingdom their only Top Ten hit would be "Wishing (If I Had a Photograph of You)". They would be followed by bands like Duran Duran whose glossy videos would come to symbolise the power of MTV. In 1983, 30% of the record sales were from British acts. On 18 July, 18 of the top 40 and 6 of the top 10 singles were by British artists. Overall record sales would rise by 10% from 1982. In April 1984, 40 of the top 100 singles and in a May 1985 survey, 8 of the top 10 singles, were of British origin.

In 1981, prog rock drummer and Genesis vocalist Phil Collins would release "In the Air Tonight" on Virgin Records, a single which would start a solo career that would see his MOR, soft rock and soul-pop records generate three UK number one singles and seven number ones on the Billboard chart. It would be the success of CD-friendly acts like Phil Collins and Dire Straits that would prompt Mark Ellen and David Hepworth to launch Q magazine in 1986, a publication that was to last for 34 years.

Another act getting three number ones in the first half of the 1980s was Frankie Goes to Hollywood. Signed to Trevor Horn's ZTT Records, Frankie Goes to Hollywood became the second act to reach number one in the UK Singles Chart with their first three single releases after fellow Liverpudlian act Gerry and the Pacemakers with both acts peaking at number two with their fourth releases and both act's frontmen (Holly Johnson and Gerry Marsden) teaming up as part of charity assemble which reached number one at the end of the 1980s. Frankie Goes to Hollywood's controversial music mixed Hi-NRG, new wave rock and synthpop together and their success was helped in part due to their videos directed people like 10cc's Godley & Creme and marketing by ZTT‘s Paul Morley, who used any outrage created and turn it into promotion for ZTT.

One of the most successful British pop band of the era were the duo Wham! with a mix of disco, soul, ballads and rap. Wham! saw four singles go to number one in the UK chart, between 1982 and 1986, with lead singer George Michael achieving three more in the period. He became the third act to reach number one in the UK Singles Chart with their first three singles but due to the fact that he was the lead singer in Wham!, and one of these records was with Aretha Franklin, this honour usually fell in the press to Jive Bunny and the Mastermixers with their rock and roll megamixes at the end of the 1980s. However, as Jive Bunny was credited on a Children in Need charity single ("It Takes Two, Baby", also featuring BBC Radio 1's Liz Kershaw and Bruno Brookes as well as AnXious Records act Londonbeat) that charted a couple of weeks before their third hit "Let's Party", it could be say that this honour only applied to the Mastermixers as many of the British Hit Singles books of the early 2000s added the charity record to their discography.

In 1987, George Michael reinvented himself as a white soul ('blue-eyed soul') singer with the multi-platinum album Faith. In the 1980s, soul emerged as a major influence on British pop music, with flourishing soul scenes in major cities like London and Manchester, the latter known for being part of the Northern Soul scene which included venues such as the Twisted Wheel and the Wigan Casino. Many black artists were supported by local radio stations (both licensed and pirate) and radio presenters/DJs like Robbie Vincent, Chris Hill and Steve Walsh. In October 1987, about seven months before he died, Walsh had a number nine hit with a cover of "I Found Lovin'" which was joined in the Top Ten by the original 1983 recording by the Fatback Band in the same week, while other popular soul covers included Phil Collins's "You Can't Hurry Love", his first number one from 1982. Other songs influenced by soul included Culture Club's "Church of the Poison Mind" (1983), The Style Council's "Speak Like a Child" (1983), Eurythmics' "Missionary Man" (1986), and Steve Winwood's "Roll With It" (1998). Also significant were Sade, Simply Red and toward the end of the decade Lisa Stansfield and Soul II Soul. Soul II Soul's breakthrough R&B hits "Keep on Movin'" and "Back to Life" in 1989 have been seen as opening the door to the mainstream for black British soul and R&B performers.

== Manufactured acts and the indie music scene 1986–1991 ==
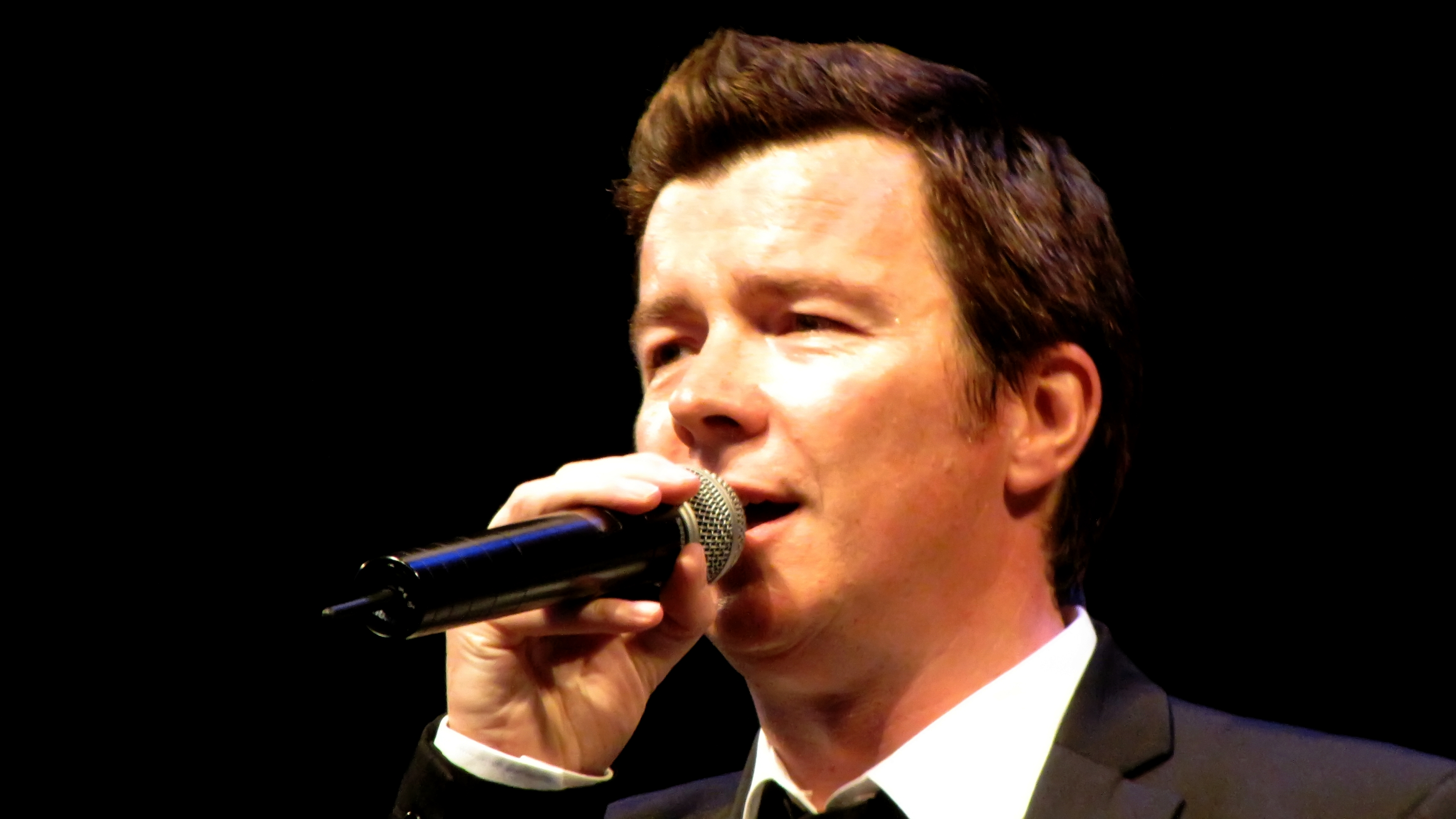
Rick Astley performing in 2009

In the mid-1980s, Hi-NRG producers in the dance and the main singles charts included Ian Levine and trio Stock Aitken Waterman, the latter had two of the most successful Hi-NRG singles ever with their productions of Dead or Alive's "You Spin Me Round (Like a Record)" (UK #1 & US #11 in 1985) and Bananarama's cover of the Shocking Blue song "Venus" (US #1 & UK #8 in 1986). Artists, including Rick Astley and Australian actors from teatime soap opera Neighbours (such as Kylie Minogue and Jason Donovan), dominated British pop music and the charts in the late 1980s and early 1990s.

In stark contrast to the upbeat dance based music of the Hi-NRG was the emergence Indie pop that emerged as part of the independent or alternative rock scenes of the 1980s, following the lead of early 80s independent bands like Aztec Camera, Orange Juice and particularly The Smiths. It was initially dubbed as 'C86' after the 1986 NME tape, and also known as "cutie", "shambling bands" and later as "twee pop". Indie pop was characterised by jangling guitars, a love of sixties pop and often fey, innocent lyrics. The UK label Sarah Records and its most popular band The Field Mice, although more diverse than the label indicates, were probably its most typical proponents. It was also inspired by the DIY scene of punk and there was a thriving fanzine, label and club and gig circuit. Genres such as Riot Grrrl and bands as diverse as Nirvana, Manic Street Preachers, and Belle and Sebastian have all acknowledged its influence. A further development was Dream pop, which followed bands like Cocteau Twins, The Chameleons, The Passions, Dif Juz, Lowlife and A.R. Kane began fusing post-punk and ethereal experiments with bittersweet pop melodies into sensual, sonically ambitious soundscapes. A louder, more aggressive strain of dream pop came to be known as shoegazing; key bands of this style were Lush, Slowdive, My Bloody Valentine, Chapterhouse, Curve and Levitation. These bands kept the atmospheric qualities of dream pop, but added the intensity of post-punk-influenced bands such as The Chameleons and Sonic Youth.

The end of the 1980s brought a lot of chart success for the British indie music scene. Coming after the moral panic around acid house, which brought D-Mob a top ten hit with "We Call It Acieed" and featuring many of the same producers/remixers from the Balearic scene, indie-dance would see guitar bands take to the dancefloor, acts like Shaun Ryder's Happy Mondays and The Stone Roses turn up on Top of The Pops and see an emphasis placed on acts from Manchester, in a local scene which became better known as Madchester. Though of all the indie-dance acts that were around in the era before grunge (1989-1991), it would be the less 'baggy' bands that would get the big international hits with Big Audio Dynamite (a band which had been mixing beatbox rock'n'roll with punk, funk, hip-hop and dance since 1984), Jesus Jones and EMF charting high in Australia, New Zealand and the US, with EMF's "Unbelievable" getting to number one on the Billboard chart.

== Boybands, girl groups, Britpop and bass: 1992–1999 ==
After Soul II Soul's breakthrough R&B hits "Keep on Movin'" and "Back to Life" in 1989, existing black soul acts, including Omar and acid jazz bands Incognito and Brand New Heavies, were now able to pursue mainstream recording careers. Particularly noticeable was the proliferation of British female black singers including Mica Paris, Caron Wheeler, Gabrielle and Heather Small.

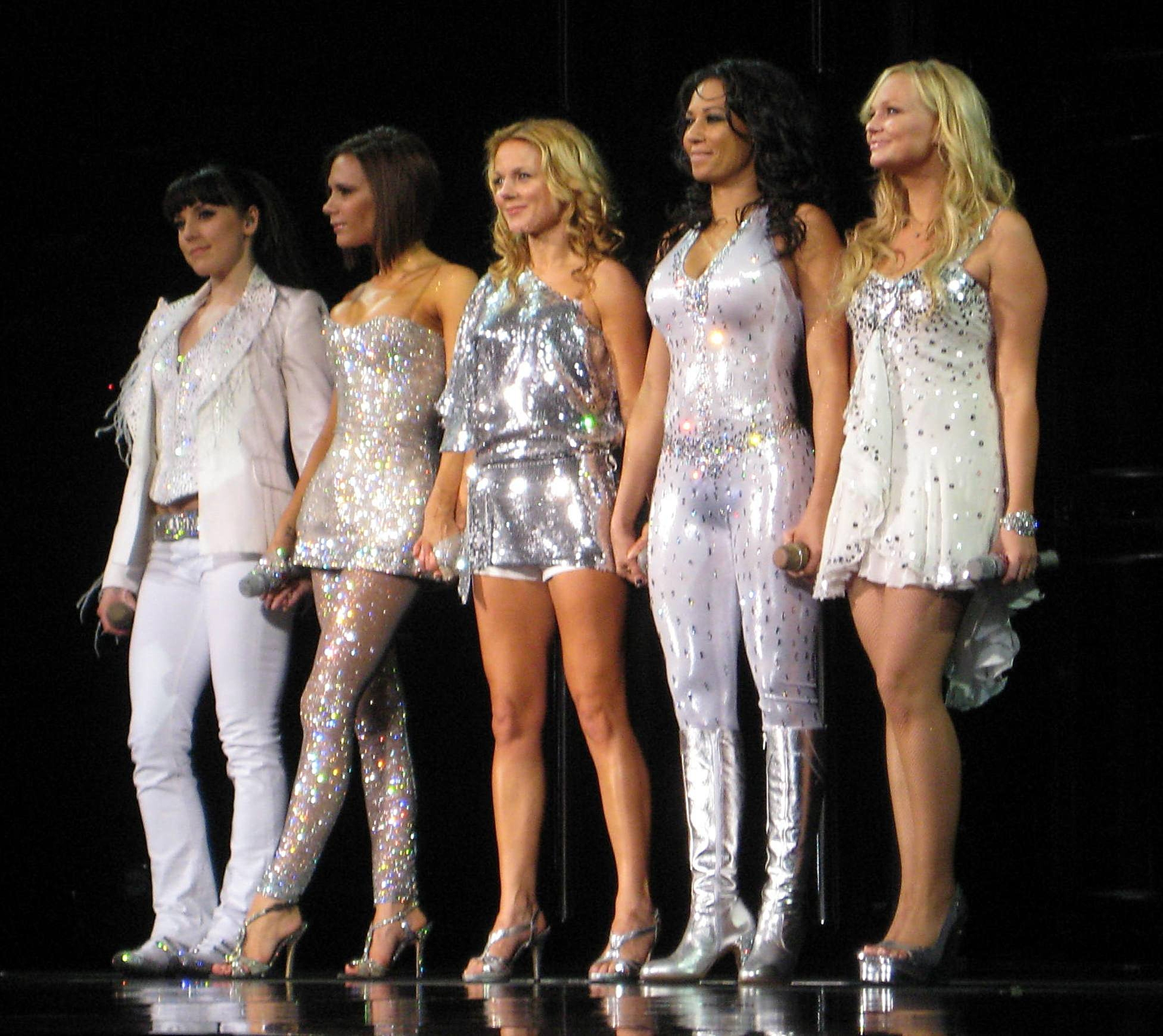
The Spice Girls on stage in 2008

The success of American vocal harmony and teen pop groups (boy bands) like New Edition and New Kids on the Block led to acts in the UK, including Nigel Martin-Smith's Take That and Tom Watkins's East 17 becoming famous from 1992, later competing with Irish bands like Boyzone and OTT. By the end of the century, acts from the early '90s like Worlds Apart and Take That had either split up or changed their line-ups substantially, but many provided the launchpad for solo careers like that of Take That's Gary Barlow, Mark Owen and Robbie Williams (with the latter act going on to achieve seven number one singles in the UK between 1998 and 2012). As the life (or at least the imperial phase) of a boyband/teen act was only a few years, new boybands would emerge at the end of the 1990s to take over as those found as the cover stars (or pull-out poster acts) in all the teen pop magazines, with 5ive, A1 and 911 all topping the UK Singles Chart around the turn of the millennium.

As well as a number of new boybands, new girl groups began to appear on the front covers and in the pages of magazines like Smash Hits and Big!, like the R&B act Eternal, who achieved a string of international hits from 1993. The most successful and influential act of the genre were the Spice Girls, who added well-aimed publicity and the ideology of girl power to their pop careers. They had nine number one singles in the UK and US, including "Wannabe", "2 Become 1" and "Spice Up Your Life". They were followed by British groups like All Saints, who had five number-one hits in the UK and two multi-platinum albums. New girl groups managed to continue to enjoy sustained success, including Sugababes and Girls Aloud, the last of these the most successful British product of the many Popstars format programmes, which began to have a major impact in the charts from the beginning of the 2000s.

Britpop emerged from the British independent music scene of the early 1990s and was characterised by bands influenced by British guitar pop music of the 1960s and 1970s. The movement developed as a reaction against various musical and cultural trends in the late 1980s and early 1990s, particularly the grunge phenomenon from the United States. New British groups such as Suede and Blur launched the movement by positioning themselves as opposing musical forces, referencing British guitar music of the past and writing about uniquely British topics and concerns. These bands were soon joined by others including Oasis, Pulp, Supergrass and Elastica. Britpop groups brought British alternative rock into the mainstream and formed the backbone of a larger British cultural movement called Cool Britannia. Although its more popular bands were able to spread their commercial success overseas, especially to the United States, the movement largely fell apart by the end of the decade.

While many Britpop musicians and associated figures frequented the Good Mixer pub in Camden, a separate music scene emerged around Madame Jojo's in Soho and an interest in easy listening music. Figures associated with this scene included Count Indigo, Lenny Beige, and Mike Flowers. The scene was associated with the success of The Mike Flowers Pops' cover version of "Wonderwall", which was a contender for the UK Christmas number one in 1995, as well as the BBC Radio 1 programme ''Radio Tip Top''. Interest in easy listening music continued into the 21st century through club nights featuring easy listening recordings, test card music and KPM production music releases.

== The download era (1999–2009) and the third British Invasion ==
After the decline of Britpop, British indie was maintained by post-Britpop bands including Radiohead, Feeder, Stereophonics and Travis, who largely abandoned the elements of national and retro-60s culture. Recently British indie bands with a foot in both the rock and pop camps has experienced a resurgence, spurred in part by the international success of the Strokes. Like modern American indie rock, many British indie bands such as Franz Ferdinand, the Libertines and Bloc Party are influenced by post-punk groups such as Joy Division, Wire, and Gang of Four. Other prominent independent bands in the 2000s include Editors, the Fratellis, Razorlight, Keane, Kaiser Chiefs, Coldplay and the Arctic Monkeys.

British soul in the 2000s has also been dominated by female singers, including Leona Lewis, Natasha Bedingfield, Joss Stone, Amy Winehouse, Estelle, Lily Allen, Florence Welch, Adele, Duffy, Jessie J, Floetry and Paloma Faith, all of whom have enjoyed success in the American charts, leading to talk of a "Female Invasion", "British Soul Invasion" or, together with successful indie acts, a "Third British Invasion". Male R&B artists who have had mainstream success in the United States include Jay Sean, Taio Cruz and One Direction. Many of these British R&B artists have increasingly incorporated electropop sounds in their music. In the early 21st century, ITV talent shows such as The X Factor discovered artists including Cher Lloyd, Will Young and Leona Lewis, all who went on to have number one hits either in the UK or abroad.

The late 2000s 'guilty pleasures pop' craze brought a lot of bands to the charts that harked back to the sounds of soft rock, glam pop and MOR. Acts like MIKA, future dance vocalist Gary Go, the Yeah You's and the Feeling were not afraid to state their less-than-trendy influences, with the Feeling going on to support Jeff Lynne's ELO during the next decade.

== Streaming era (2010–present) ==
In the 2010s, as long-term artist successes from talent shows such as The X Factor and The Voice UK became rarer, a number of new artists where launched via the 'featured artist' route. Modern British pop singers including Rita Ora and Sam Smith, were launched after being the guest vocalists on a number of dance music hits, with Smith featuring on Disclosure's "Latch" and Naughty Boy's number one success, "La La La".

Even though she appeared on The Voice UK (but did not make the grand final), Becky Hill became a 'songwriter for hire' and part of Pete Tong's live band before starting to appear on numerous dance hits by people such as Oliver Heldens, Jax Jones and Sigala. The BBC wondered if Hill was 'pop's biggest unknown star' after she notched up a series of co-credited top 40 hits, all of which were included on her Polydor compilation Get to Know, the album which stayed on the UK Albums Chart for more than a year, mainly due to the chart compiling methodology of that chart, which saw streaming points from singles included into an albums sales total. That same factor also helped Jax Jones, and saw his Snacks collection go top 10 (with a total of 78 weeks on the album chart by 3 December 2020).

Away from streaming, the popularity of the BBC's MOR/adult contemporary station Radio 2, combined with the success of various international crossover acts in the 1990s and 2000s, to create a UK country music scene that saw acts chart high on the albums chart. Where once country music would be seen either as 'naff' or 'niche' in the UK, usually only found in a specialist music slots such as Bob Harris' The Country Show on BBC Radio 2, British acts including the Shires and Ward Thomas achieved a number of top 10 albums in the main UK chart after being playlisted on daytime radio, with Ward Thomas topping the chart in 2016 with their album Cartwheels.

== See also ==
- List of number-one singles (UK)
