= 1890–91 Royal Arsenal F.C. season =

English football club season

Royal Arsenal F.C.
1890–91 season
- Chairman: None
- Manager: None
- Stadium: Invicta Ground
- FA Cup: First Round Proper
- London Senior Cup: Winner
- Kent Senior Cup: Semi-final
- Highest home attendance: 10,000 vs. 93rd Highlanders/Heart of Midlothian (11 October 1890/30 March 1891)
- Lowest home attendance: 2,500 vs. London Caledonians (30 April 1890)

The 1890–91 season was the fifth in the history of Royal Arsenal, the club that was to become Arsenal F.C. This was the club's first season as a professional side, with overwhelming support to do so from the players.

Their achievements in the previous season (winning the Kent Senior Cup and the London Charity Cup, whilst also finishing runners up in the London Senior Cup) saw them granted direct admission to the first round proper of the FA Cup, marking their first full appearance in the competition.

This season also saw them move grounds from Manor Field to the Invicta Ground, also in Plumstead. During the season, the team played in three cup competitions: the FA Cup, the London Senior Cup and the London Charity Cup. After finishing as runners-up the previous season, they won the London Senior Cup for the first time.

Turning professional meant that they rescinded their membership of both London and Kent FAs, though support for the club continued to soar, with average attendances of 6,600, higher than half the teams in The Football League.

== Matches ==
Royal Arsenal played 35 matches during the 1890–91 season, of which 27 were friendlies, 8 were competitive fixtures, with one of these being a first-class FA Cup fixture.

Date	Opponent	Ground	Comp.	Score	Attendance
6 September 1890	93rd Highlanders	H		1–1	7,000
13 September 1890	Casuals	H		5–4	7,000
20 September 1890	Ilford	H		6–0	6,000
27 September 1890	London Caledonians	H		3–1	9,000
4 October 1890	Chiswick Park	A		4–0	200
11 October 1890	93rd Highlanders	H		4–1	10,000
18 October 1890	Old St. Marks	A		4–0	1,000
25 October 1890	St. Bartholomews Hospital	H		1–0	3,000
1 November 1890	South Shore	H		2–2	8,000
8 November 1890	Ilford	A		3–0	2,000
15 November 1890	Clapton	A		1–2	5,000
22 November 1890	Gainsborough Trinity	H		2–1	7,000
1 December 1890	Cambridge University	H		5–1	6,000
6 December 1890	Casuals	H		0–0	5,500
13 December 1890	Old Westminsters	A	LSC	4–1	5,500
17 January 1891	Derby County	H	FAC	1–2	8,000
24 January 1891	Millwall Athletic	A		1–0	
26 January 1891	Everton	H		0–5	7,000
31 January 1891	Old Westminsters	A	LSC	4–5	5,000
7 February 1891	St. Bartholomews Hospital	H		5–4	5,000
14 February 1891	Crusaders	H	LCC	1–0	7,000
21 February 1891	Casuals	H	LSC	3–2	9,000
28 February 1891	Clapton	N	LSC	3–2	6,000
7 March 1891	St. Bartholomews Hospital	N	LSC (Final)	6–0	6,000
14 March 1891	Old Harrovians	H		5–1	6,000
21 March 1891	Sheffield United	H		1–1	5,000
27 March 1891	71st Highland Infantry	H		3–1	6,000
28 March 1891	Old Harrovians	H		5–0	4,000
30 March 1891	Heart of Midlothian	H		1–5	10,000
31 March 1891	Nottingham Forest	H		0–5	7,000
4 April 1891	Old Carthusians	N	LCC	1–1	6,000
8 April 1891	Old Carthusians	N	LCC	2–2	3,000
11 April 1891	Old Carthusians	N	LCC	1–2	6,000
18 April 1891	Clapton	H		3–1	6,000
25 April 1891	Sunderland	H		1–3	7,000
30 April 1891	London Caledonians	H		1–1	2,500
2 May 1891	1st Highland Light Infantry	H		5–1	3,000

== Players ==
Below is a list of all players who made at least one appearance for Arsenal over the season. Interestingly, this was also the first season in which an official substitution was recorded, with HT. Offer coming on and some point during the 25 April 1891 game against Sunderland. Players making their debut for Arsenal are shown in Bold, Goalkeepers are marked in Italics.

	FA Cup		Other cups		Friendlies		Total	
Player	App	Goals	App	Goals	App	Goals	App	Goals
H. W. Barbour	1	0	9	7	18	14	28	21
J. M. Bates	0	0	0	0	6	0	6	0
**E. Bee**	1	0	9	0	26	0	36	0
**T. H. Bennett**	0	0	0	0	2	0	2	0
**J. Campbell**	0	0	1	0	7	0	8	0
W. C. Campbell	0	0	1	1	14	9	15	10
**A. E. Casselton**	0	0	0	0	1	0	1	0
A. F. Christmas	1	0	7	3	19	11	27	14
**Collins**	0	0	0	0	2	0	2	0
**C. Collins**	0	0	0	0	1	0	1	0
**E. Collins**	0	0	0	0	2	0	2	0
P. Connolly	1	0	9	4	24	2	34	6
**Croxen**	0	0	2	0	4	0	6	0
**A. Croxen**	0	0	0	0	1	0	1	0
**D. Croxen**	0	0	0	0	1	0	1	0
**G. Croxen**	0	0	0	0	1	2	1	2
**W. Croxen**	0	0	0	0	1	0	1	0
**W. Everett**	0	0	0	0	1	0	1	0
**J. Fleming**	0	0	0	0	1	0	1	0
**Fletcher**	0	0	0	0	1	0	1	0
W. E. Fry	0	0	7	3	4	1	10	4
W. J. George	0	0	0	0	1	0	1	0
D. Gloak	1	0	8	3	19	7	28	10
**J. L. Houghton**	0	0	0	0	1	0	1	0
D. Howat	1	0	7	0	20	4	28	0
**Hutchings**	0	0	0	0	1	0	1	0
**Jenkins**	0	0	0	0	1	1	1	1
**Johnson**	0	0	0	0	1	0	1	0
**Johnstone**	0	0	0	0	1	0	1	0
**Jones**	0	0	0	0	1	0	1	0
J. W. Julian	1	0	9	0	26	2	36	2
**E. Linton**	0	0	0	0	4	3	4	3
J. D. McBean	1	0	9	0	23	0	33	0
**McHardy**	0	0	1	0	23	0	24	0
**McKenzie**	0	0	0	0	1	0	1	0
J. W. Meggs	1	0	0	0	2	0	3	0
**R. Mills**	0	0	2	0	8	2	10	2
H. T. Offer	1	1	7	4	17	8	25	13
**Parkinson**	0	0	0	0	1	0	1	0
J. Pell	0	0	0	0	2	0	2	0
**Ross**	0	0	0	0	1	0	1	0
**R. Russell**	0	0	0	0	1	1	1	1
**J. Sheppard**	0	0	0	0	2	0	2	0
W. S. Stewart	1	0	8	0	20	1	29	1
**E. Taylor**	0	0	0	0	1	0	1	0
**W. J. Wood**	0	0	2	0	2	3	4	3
