= Radio Invicta =

Radio Invicta may refer to:

- Radio Invicta (London), a 1970s/1980s pirate radio station in London
- Radio 390 (formerly Invicta), a 1960s offshore radio station

It could also refer to:

- Invicta Radio (now Heart Kent), a licensed radio station in Kent
