= Unconquered =

Unconquered or The Unconquered may refer to:

== Films ==
- Unconquered (1917 film), a drama film by Frank Reicher
- Unconquered (1947 film), an adventure film by Cecil B. DeMille
- The Unconquered (documentary) or Helen Keller in Her Story, a 1954 documentary
- The Unconquered (1956 film), a Czechoslovak war film
- Unconquered (1989 film), a made-for-television film

== Plays ==
- The Unconquered (1940 play), a stage adaptation of We the Living
- The Unconquered (2007 play), a play by Torben Betts

== Literature ==
- The Unconquered (novel), a 1953 novel by Ben Ames Williams
- "The Unconquered" (short story), a 1943 short story by W. Somerset Maugham
