= Steve Walsh (DJ) =

British disc jockey

Steve Walsh (20 September 1958 – 3 July 1988) was a British disc jockey.

== Life and career ==
Walsh began his radio career at the first soul music pirate radio station, Radio Invicta, alongside his friend Bob Tomalski. From there, he moved to JFM, a London soul pirate station. Walsh also guested on Dave Brown's soul show once a month on BBC Radio Medway, which later became BBC Radio Kent. He then decided that if he were to further his career he would have to be completely legal, and leave pirate radio. An opportunity came up at the new independent local radio station County Sound in Guildford.

He returned to London with the launch of Radio London's Soul Night Out. At the same time, he was approached by Capital Radio, having covered one Saturday on Greg Edwards's Soul Spectrum when Edwards was ill. This led to six months on Capital Radio with a slot in the small hours of Sunday. The two stations became uneasy about sharing the same DJ, and eventually Walsh went to BBC Radio London to host the Sunday 7–9 pm show, later adding a second slot on Mondays.

Although he made an impact in the radio world, Walsh will be best remembered for his live work in nightclubs. His 1987 version of the Fatback Band's "I Found Lovin'" was archetypal of the genre of "South London Soul". Walsh worked with Tony Blackburn to bring soul music to a wider audience, and shortly before his death he co-presented the dance programme Boogie Box on Music Box, alongside Michaela Strachan.

On 29 June 1988, Walsh was injured in a car crash in Ibiza, where he was filming a music video. He returned to London where he underwent surgery on his broken leg, and died of heart failure on 3 July following the surgery, leaving a wife and three children.

== Discography ==
=== Singles ===
Year	Song	^{UK Chart}
1987	"I Found Lovin'"	9
1987	"Let's Get Together Tonite"	74
1988	"Ain't No Stopping Us Now (Party for the World)"	44
