= Ted Allbeury =

British writer

- Allbeury in 1980.
- Born: 24 October 1917; Stockport, Cheshire, England (now Greater Manchester)
- Died: 4 December 2005 (aged 88); Tunbridge Wells, Kent, England
- Spouse: Grazyna (d.1999)
- Children: 4

Theodore Edward le Bouthillier Allbeury (24 October 1917 – 4 December 2005) was a British author of espionage fiction. He was an intelligence officer in the Special Operations Executive between 1940 and 1947, reaching the rank of lieutenant colonel. He is believed to be the only British secret agent to have parachuted into Nazi Germany during the war, remaining there until the Allied armies arrived. During the Cold War he was captured and tortured when running agents across the border between East and West Germany. After running his own advertising agency, he became managing director of the seafort-based pirate radio station Radio 390 in 1964, later moving to the ship-based Radio 355 until its closure in August 1967.

Allbeury's first novel, A Choice of Enemies, was published in 1972. He went on to publish over 40 novels, under the names Patrick Kelly, Richard Butler, and his own.

== Early life ==
Allbeury was born in Stockport, Cheshire, and educated at King Edward VI Aston School, Birmingham.

== Media adaptations ==
Allbeury's 1984 novel No Place to Hide was filmed as Hostage (1992) and starred Sam Neill, Talisa Soto and James Fox. The 1992 film Blue Ice starring Michael Caine is based on Allbeury characters.

BBC Radio 4 broadcast adaptions of The Other Side Of Silence (8-part serial, 1982), Pay Any Price (10-part serial, 1983), No Place To Hide (8-part serial, 1984), The Lonely Margins (1988) and Deep Purple (1993).

== Personal life ==
He was married to Grazyna, who died in 1999, and they had a son and three daughters.

== Bibliography ==
=== Novels ===
- A Choice of Enemies (1972)
- Snowball (1974) (featuring Tad Anders)
- Palomino Blonde (1975) (featuring Tad Anders) a.k.a. Omega-minus
- Where All the Girls Are Sweeter (1975) (writing as Richard Butler) a.k.a. Dangerous Arrivals
- The Special Collection (1975) a.k.a. The Networks
- The Only Good German (1976) a.k.a. Mission Berlin
- Moscow Quadrille (1976) a.k.a. Special Forces
- Italian Assets (1976) (writing as Richard Butler) a.k.a. Deadly Departures
- The Man with the President's Mind (1977)
- The Lantern Network (1978)
- The Alpha List (1979)
- Consequence of Fear (1979) a.k.a. Smokescreen
- The Reaper (1980) a.k.a. The Stalking Angel
- The Twentieth Day of January (1980) a.k.a. Cold Tactics
- Codeword Cromwell (1981) (writing as Patrick Kelly)
- The Lonely Margins (1981) (writing as Patrick Kelly)
- The Other Side of Silence (1981)
- The Secret Whispers (1981)
- Shadow of Shadows (1982)
- All Our Tomorrows (1982)
- Pay Any Price (1983)
- The Judas Factor (1984) featuring Tad Anders
- The Girl from Addis (1984)
- No Place to Hide (1984) a.k.a. Hostage
- Children of Tender Years (1985)
- The Choice (1986)
- The Seeds of Treason (1986)
- The Crossing (1987) a.k.a. Berlin Exchange
- A Wilderness of Mirrors (1988)
- Deep Purple (1989)
- A Time Without Shadows (1990) a.k.a. Rules of the Game
- The Dangerous Edge (1991)
- Show Me A Hero (1992)
- The Line-Crosser (1993)
- As Time Goes By (1994)
- Beyond the Silence (1995) a.k.a. The Spirit of Liberty
- The Long Run (1996)
- Aid and Comfort (1997)
- Shadow of a Doubt (1998)
- The Reckoning (1999)
- Never Look Back (2000)
- The Assets (2000) a.k.a. Due Process

=== Short story collection ===
- Other Kinds of Treason (1990)

=== Radio plays ===
- Long Ago and Far Away (1982)
- The Way We Live (1983)
- Time Spent in Reconnaissance (1983) – story later included in Other Kinds of Treason
- Music of a Small Life (1983)
- There's Always Tomorrow (1985) – story later included in Other Kinds of Treason as 'The Dandled Days'

=== Essays ===
- "Memoirs of an Ex-Spy," in Murder Ink: The Mystery Reader's Companion, edited by Dilys Winn (New York: Workman, 1977), pp. 164–168.
- "It's the Real Thing," New Statesman (1 July 1977): 27.
