= Undefeated =

Undefeated or The Undefeated may refer to:

== Film and television ==
- The Undefeated (1969 film), an American Western starring John Wayne, Rock Hudson
- The Undefeated (2000 film), a Ukrainian film
- Undefeated (2003 film), an American television movie starring John Leguizamo
- Undefeated (2011 film), an American sports documentary about a high school football team
- The Undefeated (2011 film), an American political documentary about Sarah Palin
- "Undefeated" (Suits), a 2011 television episode

== Literature ==
- The Undefeated, a 1919 novel by J. C. Snaith
- "The Undefeated" (short story), a 1927 story by Ernest Hemingway
- The Undefeated, a 1927 non-fiction book by Gerald W. Johnson
- "The Undefeated", a 1941 short story by Gerald Kersh, featured in his 1943 collection Selected Stories
- The Undefeated, a 1957 novel by I. A. R. Wylie, set in France during and after the Second World War
- The Undefeated, a 1959 memoir by George Paloczi-Horvath
- The Undefeated, a novelization of the 1969 film by Jim Thompson
- The Undefeated, a 1974 short story collection by Keith Laumer
- The Undefeated (novella), a 1996 novella by Irvine Welsh
- The Undefeated (picture book), a 2019 picture book by Kwame Alexander, illustrated by Kadir Nelson
- The Undefeated, a 2019 novel by Una McCormack

== Music ==
- Undefeated (band), a band from Lewis County, New York
- Undefeated (Bobby Bare Jr. album), 2014
- Undefeated (Frank Turner album), 2024
- Undefeated, an album by Secondhand Serenade, 2014
- "Undefeated" (Def Leppard song), 2011
- "Undefeated" (Jason Derulo song), 2012
- "Undefeated", a song by Audio Adrenaline from Until My Heart Caves In, 2005
- "Undefeated", a song by KB featuring Derek Minor, from 100 (EP), 2014
- "Undefeated", a song by Skillet from Unleashed, 2016
- "Undefeated", a song by a Boogie wit da Hoodie from The Bigger Artist, 2017
- "Undefeated", a song by Incubus from 8, 2017
- "Undefeated", a song by KSI from Dissimulation, 2020
- "Undefeated", an album by Double Experience, 2024

== Sports ==
- Perfect season, a sports season in which a team remains undefeated and untied
- Floyd Mayweather Jr. vs. Ricky Hatton or Undefeated, a 2007 boxing match
- The Undefeated (website), now called Andscape, an ESPN-owned website focusing on issues of race in sports
