= King Tim III (Personality Jock) =

Single by Fatback Band

from the album Fatback XII
- A-side: "You're My Candy Sweet"
- Released: July 25, 1979
- Genre: Funk; disco; old-school hip hop
- Length: 6:15; 4:10 (Single edit)
- Label: Spring Records
- Songwriters: Fred Demery, Bill Curtis
- Producers: Fatback Band, Jerry Thomas

Audio video
- "King Tim III (Personality Jock)" on YouTube

"King Tim III (Personality Jock)" is a 1979 hip hop song by the Fatback Band from the disco album Fatback XII. Engineered by Delano “Rock” McLaurin and released on July 25, 1979, this song is often cited as the beginning of recorded hip hop music. The title refers to vocalist Tim Washington. A few months later, "Rapper's Delight" came out, which is widely regarded as the first commercially released hip hop song.

The song was originally the B-side of the 7-inch single, with the A-side "You're My Candy Sweet" a mid-tempo disco song. However the song stalled at #67 after 4-weeks on the R&B chart and was replaced the following week with "King Tim III (Personality Jock)" on the chart. It peaked at #26 on the R&B chart and stayed on for 11 weeks.

== Background ==
=== Hip-hop and the Fatback Band ===
Hip-hop music originated in the Bronx, and its birthdate, although disputed, is traditionally said to be an August 11, 1973 party by DJ Kool Herc. By 1979, the only hip-hop recordings that had been made were cassette tapes of live performances. These were bought and sold locally, but a record intended for the mass market had never been produced. Multiple musicians, such as Grandmaster Flash, had been approached about the idea of making such a record, but they turned it down for various reasons, such as doubting it would sell or believing it would make their party performances obsolete.

The Fatback Band formed in Queens around the year 1970. (Note: Sources differ on whether the Fatback Band formed in the late 1960s, the early 1970s, or the year 1970.) They were initially a funk and jazz band, but by the end of the decade they were playing an equal amount of disco too. By 1979, they had already achieved considerable success with songs such as "Street Dance" (1973), "(Do the) Spanish Hustle" (1976), and "I Like Girls" (1978), all top-30 hits on the Billboard R&B chart.

=== Creation ===
While Fatback were finishing up their 1979 album Fatback XII, bandleader and percussionist Bill Curtis felt that the album did not yet have a potential hit song. One of the songs that had been recorded for the album was a mostly instrumental piece titled "Catch the Beat", and Curtis came up with the idea to add rapping overtop of it. The Fatback Band had been exposed to hip-hop while performing around New York, including hearing cassette tapes and seeing DJ Hollywood perform at the Apollo Theater. According to Joseph C. Edwoozie, Curtis was "[a]lways keeping his ear open to innovations in black-music traditions".

Timothy Washington, a little-known MC and DJ who went by the stage name King Tim III, was brought in to rap over the track. Washington was reportedly friends with Anthony Bee, one of Fatback's roadies. It was also reported that Gerry Thomas, the band's keyboardist and Curtis's creative partner, was impressed after hearing a cassette of Washington rapping over the song "Running Away" by Roy Ayers.

== Release ==
After adding Washington's rapping, the song's title was changed from "Catch the Beat" to "King Tim III (Personality Jock)". The phrase "Personality Jock" refers to radio DJs, as Curtis saw a connection between this new hip-hop style of rapping and the traditional "rapping" of Black radio DJs, citing Jocko Henderson as an example.

"King Tim III" was released on July 25, 1979, as the B-side of a single, with another song from Fatback XII, "You're My Candy Sweet", as the A-side. Curtis had pushed for "King Tim III" to be the A-side, but the band's label, Spring Records, was concerned that radio DJs would take offense to the song and refuse to play it. Curtis was also amused that "You're My Candy Sweet" was chosen as the A-side, as it features him on vocals and he "can't even carry a tune in a bucket!"

Despite the label's concerns, "King Tim III" began receiving more airplay and attention than the A-side, to the point that Spring rereleased the single with the sides switched. The rap song peaked at number 26 on the Billboard R&B chart while "You're My Candy Sweet" only reached number 67.

== Bibliography ==
- Charnas, Dan (2011). The Big Payback: The History of the Business of Hip-Hop. New York: Penguin Group. ISBN 978-1-101-56811-8.
- Ewoodzie, Joseph C. (2017). Break Beats in the Bronx: Rediscovering Hip-Hop's Early Years. University of North Carolina Press. ISBN 978-1-4696-3276-6.
- Katz, Mark (2012). Groove Music: The Art and Culture of the Hip-Hop DJ. Oxford University Press. ISBN 978-0-19-533112-7.
- Larkin, Colin, ed. (1994). The Guiness Who's Who of Rap, Dance & Techno. UK. ISBN 978-0-85112-788-0.
- Ruhlmann, William (2003). "Fatback Band". In Bogdanov, Vladimir; Bush, John; Woodstra, Chris; Erlewine, Stephen Thomas (eds.). All Music Guide to Soul: The Definitive Guide to R&B and Soul. San Francisco: Backbeat Books. pp. 235–237. ISBN 978-0-87930-744-8.
- Thompson, Dave (2001). Funk. San Francisco: Backbeat Books. ISBN 978-0-87930-629-8.
- Toop, David (1984). The Rap Attack: African Jive to New York Hip Hop. London: Pluto Press. ISBN 978-0-86104-777-2.
