= Fatback Band =

American funk band

- Origin: New York City, U.S.
- Genres: Funk; soul; R&B; disco
- Years active: 1970–present
- Labels: Perception; Event; Spring; Cotillion
- Members: Bill "Fatback" Curtis; Gerry Thomas; Zack Guinn; Marell A. Glenn; Christopher Campbell; Jessie Storey; Ed Jackson; Satish Robertson
- Past members: Cordell “Pete” Everett; Earl Shelton; Isabella Dunn Gordon; Quenetta "Que" Simpson; Ledjerick Todd Woods; Darryl McAllister; George Williams; Bob "Zoot" James; Johnny Flippin; Johnny King; Billy Hamilton; Wayne Woolford; Michael Walker
- Website: www.fatbackband.com

The Fatback Band (later, simply Fatback) is an American funk and disco band that was popular in the 1970s and 1980s. The Fatback Band is most known for their R&B hits: "(Do the) Spanish Hustle", "I Like Girls", "Gotta Get My Hands on Some (Money)", "Backstrokin'" and "I Found Lovin'".

Their 1979 single "King Tim III (Personality Jock)" is generally considered the first commercially released hip hop single.

== History ==
Formed in New York City in 1970, the Fatback Band was the concept of Bill Curtis, an experienced session drummer, inspired to merge the "fatback" jazz beat of New Orleans into a funk band. In addition to Curtis, the band's initial line-up included guitarist Johnny King, bassist Johnny Flippin, trumpet player George Williams, saxophonist Earl Shelton, flautist George Adams, and keyboardist Gerry Thomas. The band specialized in playing "street funk". The group also later included conga player Wayne Woolford, vocalists Jayne and Gerry, Deborah Cooper, saxophonist Fred Demerey and guitarists Louis Wright and George Victory.

The Fatback Band signed to Perception Records and had a hit single that summer with "Street Dance". The single reached the top 30 on the US Billboard R&B chart, but failed to cross over to the Pop chart, a pattern the group would follow for the rest of their career. The band released the albums Let's Do It Again, People Music, and Feel My Soul before signing to Event Records in 1974.

In the mid-1970s, the band incorporated jazz elements and moved more towards a disco sound resulting in the singles, "Keep On Steppin'", "Yum, Yum (Give Me Some)", and "(Are You Ready) Do the Bus Stop". The singles proved popular in dance clubs, but did not do as well on the R&B chart until the spring of 1976 when "(Do The) Spanish Hustle" came close to the top ten.

Now recording for Spring/Polydor, the group continued with the singles "Party Time", "The Booty", and "Double Dutch". Late 1977 brought a name change to Fatback, and in 1978 they found their first top ten single with "I Like Girls". The song "King Tim III (Personality Jock)" is often considered to be the first commercially released rap single, having shipped just a week before the Sugarhill Gang's "Rapper's Delight" in October 1979.

In 1980, Fatback had a pair of their biggest hits with "Gotta Get My Hands on Some (Money)" and "Backstrokin'". Also finding the charts in the 1980s were "Take It Any Way You Want It", "I Found Lovin'" and "Spread Love", with singer Evelyn Thomas, in 1985. Whilst American pop success proved elusive, the group made regular appearances on the UK Singles Chart, including the top ten twice with "(Do The) Spanish Hustle" and "I Found Lovin'"; the latter also covered by British disc jockey Steve Walsh, reached the top ten at the same time as the original version.

Keyboardist Gerry Thomas was simultaneously a member of the Jimmy Castor Bunch, so the band elected to remain close to the New York area instead of extensive touring. They had substantial success in the UK. As recently as 2019, the Fatback Band performed at multiple concerts and festivals in London and other cities in England. Their 2020 tour was cancelled due to the COVID-19 pandemic. They had a new album to be released in 2021 and had performances scheduled in July 2021.

== Band members ==
=== Current ===
- Bill "Fatback" Curtis – drums/percussions (1970–present)
- Xavier Zack Guinn – bass guitar, vocals (2015–present)
- Ledjerick Todd Woods – trumpet (2002–present)
- Darryl McAllister – guitar, vocals (2005–present)
- Isabella Dunn Gordon – vocals
- Montreal Parker – drums
- Marell Glenn – keyboards (2018–present)
- Ed Jackson – saxophone, vocals (1990–present)

=== Past ===
- Billy Hamilton – organ, keyboard (1970–1972)
- Earl Shelton – saxophone (1970–1979)
- Johnny King – guitar, vocals (1970–1979)
- Johnny Flippin – bass, percussion, vocals (1971–1983)
- Gerry Thomas – keyboard (1971–1985)
- George Adams – flute (1972–1974)
- Skip Walker – drums (1985–1988, 2007)
- Tom Browne – trumpet (1976)
- Najee – saxophone (1983)
- John DeBerry – vocals (1985–1988, 1997)
- Wayne Woolford – percussion (1973)
- Fred Demerey – saxophone (1977, 1979–1981)
- Louis Wright – guitar (1976–1977)
- George Victory – guitar (1977, 1979–1981, 1983)
- Deborah Cooper – backing vocals (1977–1979)
- Michael Walker – keyboard, vocals (1981, 1983)
- Robert Damper – keyboard (1983–1987)
- Linda Blakely (d.1994) – vocals (1982–1987)
- Vernon Lloyd – bass guitar, vocals (1983–1990)
- Quenetta "Que" Simpson – vocals (1996–2006)

== Discography ==
=== Albums ===
Year	Album	Peak chart positions			
Year	Album	US	US R&B	UK	AUS
1972	Let's Do It Again	—	—	—	—
1973	People Music	—	—	—	—
1974	Feel My Soul	—	—	—	—
1974	Keep on Steppin'	—	—	—	—
1975	Yum Yum	—	—	—	—
1975	Raising Hell	158	37	19	35
1976	Night Fever	182	31	—	81
1977	NYCNYUSA	—	54	—	91
1977	Man with the Band	—	—	—	—
1978	Fired Up 'N' Kickin	73	17	—	—
1979	Brite Lites/Big City	—	57	—	—
1979	Fatback XII	89	16	—	—
1980	Hot Box	44	7	—	—
1980	14 Karat	91	16	—	—
1981	Tasty Jam	102	17	—	—
1981	Gigolo	148	68	—	—
1982	On the Floor with Fatback	—	28	—	—
1983	Is This the Future?	—	27	—	—
1983	With Love	—	64	—	—
1984	Phoenix	—	—	—	—
1985	So Delicious	—	—	—	—
1987	Live	—	—	80	—
1988	Tonight's an All-Nite Party	—	—	—	—
2004	Second Generation	—	—	—	—
"—" denotes releases that did not chart or were not released in that territory.

=== Singles ===
Year	Single	Peak chart positions					Certifications	Album
Year	Single	US	US R&B	US Dance	UK	AUS	Certifications	Album
1973	"Street Dance"	—	26	—	—	—		Let's Do It Again
1973	"Njia (Njia) Walk (Street Walk)"	—	56	—	—	—		People Music
1973	"Soul March"	—	69	—	—	—		People Music
1974	"Keep on Steppin'"	—	50	—	—	—		Keep on Steppin'
1974	"Wicki-Wacky"	—	94	—	82 (Note: "Wicki-Wacky" peaked at number 82 after being reissued with "Is This the Future?" in October 1985.)	—		Keep on Steppin'
1975	"(Hey I) Feel Real Good (Part One)"	—	—	—	—	—		Yum Yum
1975	"Yum Yum (Gimme Some)"	—	80	—	40	—		Yum Yum
1975	"(Are You Ready) Do the Bus Stop"	—	37	15	18	26		Raising Hell
1976	"(Do the) Spanish Hustle"	101	12	5	10	—		Raising Hell
1976	"Party Time"	—	84	—	41	—		Raising Hell
1976	"Night Fever"	—	—	28	38	—		Night Fever
1976	"The Booty"	—	32	—	—	—		Night Fever
1977	"Double Dutch"	—	52	—	31	—		NYCNYUSA
1977	"NYCNYUSA"	—	—	—	—	—		NYCNYUSA
1977	"Mile High"	—	—	—	—	—		Man with the Band
1977	"Master Booty"	—	88	27	—	—		Man with the Band
1978	"I Like Girls"	101	9	—	—	—		Fired Up 'N' Kickin'
1978	"I'm Fired Up"	—	—	—	—	—		Fired Up 'N' Kickin'
1978	"Freak the Freak the Funk (Rock)"	—	36	—	—	—		Brite Lites, Big City
1979	"(Do the) Boogie Woogie"	—	—	—	—	—		Brite Lites, Big City
1979	"You're My Candy Sweet"	—	67	—	—	—		Fatback XII
1979	"King Tim III (Personality Jock)"	—	26	62	—	—		Fatback XII
1979	"Love in Perfect Harmony"	—	59	—	—	—		Fatback XII
1980	"Gotta Get My Hands on Some (Money)"	—	6	—	—	—		Hot Box
1980	"Backstrokin'"	—	3	53	41	—		Hot Box
1980	"Let's Do It Again"	—	55	—	—	—		14 Karat
1980	"(To Be) Without Your Love"	—	—	—	—	—		14 Karat
1980	"Angel"	—	67	—	—	—		14 Karat
1981	"Take It Any Way You Want It"	—	19	—	—	—		Tasty Jam
1981	"Kool Whip"	—	64	—	—	—		Tasty Jam
1981	"Rockin' to the Beat"	—	50	—	—	—		Gigolo
1981	"I'm So in Love"	—	—	—	—	—		Gigolo
1982	"On the Floor"	—	36	—	—	—		On the Floor with Fatback
1982	"She's My Shining Star"	—	76	—	—	—		On the Floor with Fatback
1983	"The Girl Is Fine (So Fine)"	—	28	47	77	—		Is This the Future?
1983	"Is This the Future?"	—	43	—	82 (Note: "Is This the Future?" peaked at number 82 after being reissued with "Wicki-Wacky" in October 1985.)	—		Is This the Future?
1983	"Up Against the Wall"	—	—	—	—	—		Is This the Future?
1983	"Please Stay"	—	—	—	—	—		With Love
1983	"I Found Lovin'"	—	—	—	7 (Note: "I Found Lovin'" originally peaked at number 49 in June 1984. A first reissue from 1986 peaked at number 55. A second reissue peaked at number 7 in October 1987. The song spent a combined total of 59 weeks on the UK Singles Chart.)	—	BPI: Silver	With Love
1984	"I Wanna Be Your Lover"	—	—	—	—	—		With Love
1984	"Call Out My Name"	—	70	—	—	—		Phoenix
1984	"You've Got That Magic"	—	—	—	—	—		Phoenix
1984	"Spread Love"	—	88	32	—	—		Is This the Future?
1985	"Girls on My Mind"	—	79	—	69	—		So Delicious
1985	"Lover Undercover"	—	—	—	86	—		So Delicious
1985	"She's a Go-Getter"	—	—	—	—	—		So Delicious
1987	"Bus Stop (Stop and Go mix)"	—	—	—	—	38		—N/a
1987	"Sunshine Lady"	—	—	—	96	—		Is This the Future?
1987	"Rhythm of the Night"	—	—	—	94	—		Tonite's an All-Nite Party
1988	"All Nite Party"	—	—	—	—	—		Tonite's an All-Nite Party
2007	"Feel the Fire"	—	—	—	—	—		—N/a
"—" denotes releases that did not chart or were not released in that territory.
