= Jeff Redd =

American singer

- Born: February 2, 1969 (age 57); New York City, U.S.
- Genres: New jack swing; R&B•Reggae
- Years active: 1985–present

Jeff Redd (born February 2, 1969) is an American singer and record producer who performed new jack swing-style R&B music in the late 1980s and early 1990s.

== Career ==
A New York native, Redd began singing with the short-lived group, The Sophisticated Gents, at the age of 17 in the mid-1980s. Redd has also appeared on Sesame Street to sing a song demonstrating "between".

Redd signed a deal with Uptown Records/MCA Records after André Harrell saw him perform as a solo artist. Uptown/MCA produced his 1990 debut album A Quiet Storm. It included the uptempo new jack swing tracks "I Found Lovin'" and "Come and Get Your Lovin'," and the ballad "Love High." Two of the album's singles found their way onto the Billboard R&B chart: "What Goes Around Comes Around" reached #53, and "Love High" reached #16.

The album A Quiet Storm had major producers such as Devante Swing from Jodeci and Timmy Allen as well as The Untouchables Dave "Jam" Hall and Eddie F.

He released a song entitled "You Called and Told Me" from the Strictly Business soundtrack in 1991. The song samples "Catch the Beat" by T-Ski Valley.

Redd played a large part in getting then-unknown singer Mary J. Blige her start in the music industry. While working on the assembly line at General Motors, Redd met Blige's stepfather, who gave Redd a tape that featured Blige performing Anita Baker's "Caught Up in the Rapture." After hearing the tape, Redd helped her get signed to Uptown Records. Blige then toured with Redd as one of his backup singers.

In 1994, Redd recorded a second album, Down Low. However, before the album could see release, EMI America shuttered their entire black music department. As a result, very few copies ever circulated. Some of the album was produced by rapper Lord Finesse. In 1996 he dabbled in reggae with producer and singer Robert Ffrench with two singles, one featuring Grand Puba called Cry No More and the other titled Time Is Slipping both being released in 1996.

In 2024, Down Low was officially released to digital and streaming platforms under Capitol Records.

Jeff Redd then went on to work as an A&R executive at MCA Records. While at MCA, Redd worked with artists like Regina Belle and K-Ci & JoJo. When MCA closed their doors in 2003, Redd established his own independent label Sol Real Records. Under this banner, Redd currently works with artists Akili, Blaq Rose and Forever, among others. In 2007, Redd released a compilation album entitled Jeff Redd Presents: The Essence of Soul, a sampler which features tracks from each of these artists. In April 2010, Redd released "Take You Higher".

== Discography ==
=== Studio albums ===
Year	Album	US R&B	Label
1990	A Quiet Storm	40	Uptown/MCA
1994	Down Low	—	EMI America
"—" denotes releases that did not chart.

=== Singles ===
Year	Single	US R&B
1989	"I Found Lovin'"	19
1990	"Come and Get Your Lovin'"	—
1990	"Love High"	16
1990	"What Goes Around, Comes Around"	53
1991	"You Called and Told Me"	63
1993	"Show You"	—
"—" denotes releases that did not chart.
