= Sol Invictus (disambiguation) =

Sol Invictus is a Roman god identified with Sol (the solar deity in Ancient Roman religion).

Sol Invictus may also refer to:

- Sol Invictus (band), an English neofolk band
- Sol Invictus (album), a 2015 album by Faith No More
- Sol Invictus (Akhenaton album), 2001
- Sol Invictus (holiday), a religious holiday celebrated in ancient Rome

== See also ==
- Augustus Sol Invictus (born c. 1983), former Libertarian, alt-right Republican candidate for U.S. Senate in Florida
- Elagabalus (deity), a Syrian sun god
- Mithraism
- Sol (disambiguation)
- Invictus (disambiguation)
