= The Unconquered (short story) =

- Short story by W. Somerset Maugham
- Country: United Kingdom
- Language: English

Publication
- Published in: United Kingdom
- Published in English: 1943

Chronology
| The Treasure | The Verger |

"The Unconquered" is a 1943 short story by the British writer W. Somerset Maugham. It was included in the 1947 collection of Maugham stories Creatures of Circumstance.

It is set in occupied France during the Second World War and its plot centres on the Frenchwoman Annette being raped by a German soldier Hans.

== Summary ==
In occupied France during the Second World War, two German soldiers stationed at Soissons ask the way at a nearby farm; they get drunk on the farmer's wine and one of them, Hans, rapes Annette, the farmer's daughter.

Later Hans, enjoying his life in the area, visits the farm to show there is no ill-feeling. He continues to visit whenever he can and, bringing much-needed food, gets on friendly terms with the farmer and his wife. Annette is defiantly opposed to Hans.

On one visit she tells him she is pregnant. Hans, realizing he loves Annette, has plans to marry her and take over the farm; the farmer and his wife, who have no son to inherit the farm, consent to the idea. But Annette says, "I hate him. I hate his vanity and arrogance.... I think I should die happy if I could find a way to wound him as he's wounded me." The farmer says, "We've been defeated and we must accept the consequences. We've got to make the best arrangement we can with the conquerers."

Soon after the birth, Hans arrives at the farm. He cries, "Oh, my God, I'm so happy.... I want to see Annette." But Annette is not there; she has drowned the baby in a nearby brook.

== Adaptations ==
The story was adapted for television in 1970 by James Saunders, starring Michael Pennington as Hans, Caroline Mortimer as Annette and Jack Woolgar and Sheila Burrell as Monsieur and Madame Perrier.

In 2007, it was adapted by Torben Betts as a stage play, also under the title The Unconquered.
