= The Unconquered (2007 play) =

Play for four actors by Torben Betts

The Unconquered is a play for four actors by Torben Betts which premiered at the Byre Theatre, St Andrews in February 2007 before touring the United Kingdom (venues including the Tron Theatre in Glasgow, the Traverse Theatre in Edinburgh and London's Arcola Theatre.) It received critical acclaim and won the award for Best New Play at the Critics Awards for Theatre in Scotland, 2007. Keith McIntyre's cartoon-like design was nominated for an award at the same time. The production was remounted in 2008, and toured the country again before taking part in the Brits-off-Broadway Season in New York City followed by Trap Door Theatre's production in Chicago.

Inspired by the short story of the same name by W. Somerset Maugham, the play is set during World War II and centres on an intelligent school girl who rejects the establishment by burying her head in her books, while her parents maintain a cocoon of domesticity around her. Daily life is then disrupted by a people's revolution and the girl is raped by a soldier of the Free World, who is part of the invading counter-revolutionary army. The parents make an accommodation with the soldier as the old order is restored, while the girl continues her resistance with tragic consequences.

The play has been translated into French (L'insoumise) by Blandine Pélissier.
