= Undefeated (band) =

Rock band formed in 2017

- Origin: Lowville and Croghan, New York
- Genres: Rock, heavy metal
- Years active: 2017–present
- Members: Meredith Dunckel: Christian Dunckel; Lis Dunckel
- Past members: Ian Birk
- Website: undefeatedofficial.com

Undefeated is an American rock band from Lewis County, New York. They released an EP, Shadows, in 2020. The siblings Meredith and Christian Dunckel formed the band in 2017 with Ian Birk. Birk was later replaced by the Dunckel's sister, Lis.

== History ==
The band formed in 2017 in Lowville and Croghan, New York. A music promoter, Matthew Sposato, had requested that Meredith Dunckel, who had just turned 14, perform at his festival, the Rock N Worship Show, in Dalton, Massachusetts. She enjoyed the experience, and on the bus ride home, she and her brother Christian decided to form a band. They chose the name Undefeated, after a song of the same name by the rapper KB. Meredith sings and plays guitar, and Christian plays drums. Christian also screams on some songs.

On August 5, 2017, the duo performed the band's inaugural concert on the lawn of a bookstore in Inlet, New York. Three months later, the siblings met Ian Birk and he joined on bass guitar. The group released their first single, "Shadows", in August 2019, and a five-song EP, Shadows, on June 30, 2020. On August 7, 2021, Birk stepped down from the band due to him being unable to commit to their touring schedule. To replace him, Meredith and Christian brought in their fourteen-year-old sister, Lis Dunckel, even though at that time she did not know how to play bass guitar. She then took seven months to learn the instrument. On February 18, 2023, Undefeated opened for Ronny Munroe's project Beyond the Wrath in Oneida, New York. On August 16, 2024, they performed at the annual Soulfest festival in Greenfield, Massachusetts.

== Style and influences ==
Undefeated performs rock and metal music. Chris Gatto from Heaven's Metal Magazine noted the trio "for their colorful hair and transitions between harder edged music and lighter fair." The New Release Today staff writer TommyG compared Meredith's voice to Amy Lee of Evanescence. Influences for the band as a whole include Lacey Sturm of Flyleaf, Wage War, and Impending Doom. Meredith claims Sturm as a particular voice and lyrical influence. She also cites Tenth Avenue North as her "first love". Christian Dunckel is influenced by metal, djent, and screamo. Specifically, he cites older Random Hero, Red, Nine Lashes, Demon Hunter, Luke Holland and Gojira's Mario Duplantier as influences. Ian Birk, the previous bassist, drew influence from classic rock, especially the Beatles, Led Zeppelin, Billy Joel, and the Police. Birk also stated that "Literally everything influences me. Whether it's something good, or even if it's bad. Everyone needs a place to just be themselves." Lis Dunckel claims influence from Impending Doom and Tanya O'Callaghan.

== Members ==
Current members

- Meredith Dunckel – guitar, vocals (2017–present)
- Christian Dunckel – drums, backing screams (2017–present)
- Lis Dunckel – bass guitar (2021–present)

Former members

- Ian Birk – bass guitar (2017–2021)

Timeline

== Discography ==
=== Extended plays ===
- Shadows (2020)

=== Singles ===
- "Shadows" (2019)
- "Where Are You" (2020)
- "Land of the Dead" (2021)
- "Cages" (2021)
- "Story" (2022)
- "Future" (2022)
- "Choke" (2022"
- "Two-Faced" (2022)
- "As You Are" (2022)
- "Insane" (2024)
- "Rise" (2024)
- "Just the Way It Is" (2025)
- Enough" (2025)
- "Fate Has Her Favorites" (2026)
