= Bob Tomalski =

Bob Tomalski (7 February 1953 – 13 January 2001), aka Roger Tate was a journalist, "gadget guru", broadcaster and longtime proponent of radio broadcasting freedom. He founded Home Cinema Choice magazine and contributed to many other magazines on the subjects of TV, video, satellite TV, mobile phones and camcorders. He also appeared regularly on Sky News' weekly Technofile programme, reviewing gadgets alongside presenter Martin Stanford and was a regular contributor to Media Network, a weekly radio programme on the English service of Radio Netherlands.

== Career ==
Tomalski started his broadcasting career on the south west London pirate scene of the 1970s, when he was the host of Roger Tate's Mailbox Show on European Music Radio, and later became a licensed amateur radio operator with the call sign G6CQF.

His maisonette in Mitcham, Surrey was equipped with a broadcast-quality mixing desk and two Nakamichi cassette decks, alongside the high-quality turntables. These were complemented by a collection of several thousand albums, mainly of his favourite genre; soul and funk, but topped up with many chart albums and a few hundred 60s and 70s rock records. He was also a collector of state of the art video equipment.

Tomalski was a co-founder of Wandle Valley Radio (WVR) in 1984, still under the pseudonym "Roger Tate", broadcasting a soul/funk/hi-energy programme alongside Alan Rogers and Paul James (both pseudonyms). He provided the studio facilities for the station, which was amongst the pioneers of microwave links from the studio to the FM Band II transmitter, a technology later very widely used in pirate radio. Another technology which Tomalski pioneered was that of computer data transmission via Band II FM radio - raw data transmitted onto the audio signal with no subcarrier: WVR featured the "Roger Tate Computer Program Programme" with Tomalski introducing (after the music had ended for the night) half an hour of 8-bit data sounds played from a Nakamichi cassette deck, representing programs for the BBC Micro and the Tandy TRS-80 microcomputers, among others. Feedback on the programme and Tomalski was positive.

His home studio was raided in the late 80s after alleged transmission offences, and the Home Office even went as far as confiscating his electric kettle (as well as the studio gear), on the grounds that it was connected to the same ring main as his transmitting equipment.

In his subsequent radio career, Tomalski was a regular contributor to You and Yours and The Big Byte on BBC Radio. He also broadcast for Radio Mercury and Radio Invicta, and was the resident 'Inspector Gadget' on the LBC Weekend Wireless Show, talking about the week's technology news, reviewing gadgets and answering listener queries.
