= I Found Lovin' =

1983 song by the Fatback Band

Single by Fatback Band

from the album With Love
- B-side: "I Found Lovin' (Dub)" (original and 2nd re-release); "Is This the Future?" (1st re-release)
- Released: 1983; August 1986 (1st re-release); January 1987 (2nd re-release)
- Genre: Funk; R&B
- Label: Master Mix (original and 2nd re-release); Important (1st re-release)
- Songwriter(s): Johnny Flippin; Michael Walker
- Producer(s): Bill Curtis; Gerry Thomas

"I Found Lovin'" is a song first released by the Fatback Band in 1983 by Master Mix Records. Co-written by long-time Fatback Band bassist Johnny Flippin and then-new singer/keyboardist Michael Walker (the latter of whom performed lead vocals on the track), "I Found Lovin'" was included on the group's album With Love.

The song reached number 49 on the UK Singles Charts in 1984. The song was re-recorded and released by Important Records in August 1986, upon which it reached number 55 in the UK. In January 1987, the original release of the song was re-released, which peaked at number 7 in the charts.

While the song did not have a showing on the U.S. R&B singles chart in any of its three releases, it received airplay on American Urban contemporary stations. It was also featured near the beginning of the 2002 film Brown Sugar, although it does not appear on the soundtrack.

== Track listings ==
7": Master Mix / CHE 8401 (1983 & 1987, UK)

1. "I Found Lovin'" (LP Version) – 4:05
2. "I Found Lovin'" (Dub) – 6:11

12": Master Mix / 12 CHE 8401 (1983 & 1987, UK)

1. "I Found Lovin'" (Remix) – 7:10
2. "I Found Lovin'" (LP Version) – 4:05
3. "I Found Lovin'" (Dub) – 6:11

7": Important / TAN 10 (1986, UK)

1. "I Found Lovin'"
2. "Is This the Future?"

12": Important / TANRT 10 (1986, UK)

1. "I Found Lovin'" (The London Boys Mix)
2. "I Found Lovin'" (The Anthem Mix)

7": ZYX / 1346 (1987, Germany)

1. "I Found Lovin'" – 3:00
2. "Is This the Future?" – 3:20

12": ZYX / 5749 (1987, Germany)

1. "I Found Lovin'" (UK Master-Mix) – 7:10
2. "I Found Lovin'" (LP-Version) – 4:05

12": ZYX / 5749 (1987, Germany)

1. "I Found Lovin'" – 4:05
2. "Is This the Future" – 6:05

12": SPR / 12-431 (1988, US)

1. "I Found Lovin'" (Vocal) – 4:00
2. "I Found Lovin'" (Hot Instrumental Mix) – 3:43

12" Promo: NFR / 0066 (1988, US)

1. "I Found Lovin'" (DJG Lovin' Club Mix) – 6:37
2. "I Found Lovin'" (DJG Lovin' Radio Mix) – 3:50
3. "I Found Lovin'" (DJ Greek's Hard Head Mix) – 5:36
4. "I Found Lovin'" (Next Moove Classic Remix) – 5:44
5. "I Found Lovin'" (Axis Across the Track Remix) – 6:57
6. "I Found Lovin'" (DJG Lovin' Instrumental) – 6:37

== Charts ==
Chart (1984)	Peak position
UK Singles (OCC)	49

Chart (1986)	Peak position
UK Singles (OCC)	55

Chart (1987)	Peak position
Europe (European Hot 100 Singles)	44
UK Singles (OCC)	7

== Certifications ==
Region	Certification	Certified units/sales
United Kingdom (BPI)	Silver	200,000^{‡}
^{‡} Sales+streaming figures based on certification alone.

== Steve Walsh version ==
"I Found Lovin'"

Single by Steve Walsh
- B-side: "Na Na Hey Hey (Kiss Him Goodbye) (released as a double A-side in the UK)"
- Released: June 1987
- Length: 3:30; 7:21 (12")
- Label: A.1.
- Songwriter(s): Johnny Flippin; Michael Walker
- Producer(s): Martyn Levett; John Themis

Steve Walsh singles chronology
"I Found Lovin'" (1987)	""Let's Get Together Tonite"" (1987)

British DJ Steve Walsh covered the song as his debut single in 1987. The song peaked at number 9 in the UK in the same week as the Fatback Band's version peaked at number 7. In the UK, it was released as a double A-side with a cover of Steam's "Na Na Hey Hey (Kiss Him Goodbye)" (whereas this was released as a B-side elsewhere). Walsh went on to record two more singles before his death in 1988.

=== Track listings ===
7"

1. "I Found Lovin'" (7" Edit) – 3:30
2. "Na Na Hey Hey (Kiss Him Goodbye)" – 3:20

12"

1. "I Found Lovin'" (Full Version) – 7:21
2. "Na Na Hey Hey Kiss Him Goodbye" (Extended Version) – 4:59
- Track 1 known as "I Found Lovin' You What! (Megamix)"
- Track 2 known as "Na Na Hey Hey Kiss Him Goodbye (Large Mix)"

=== Charts ===
Chart (1987)	Peak position
Europe (European Hot 100 Singles)	46
Ireland (IRMA)	8
Netherlands (Single Top 100)	86
UK Singles (OCC)	9

== Other versions ==
- In 1989, American R&B singer Jeff Redd released a cover of the song for his 1990 debut album A Quiet Storm which reached number 19 on the US Hot R&B/Hip Hop Songs chart.
- Also in 1989, American rapper B-Fats released a cover titled "I Found Love" from his album Music Maestro which reached number 53 on the US Hot R&B/Hip Hop Songs chart.
- In 1992, British rapper Monie Love sampled Fatback Band's version in her UK top 40 single "Full Term Love".
- In 1996, British rap/soul outfit Love City Groove released a cover version of the song.
- In 2012, British singer Andy Abraham covered the song for his album Remember When....
