= Roma invicta =

Latin idiom

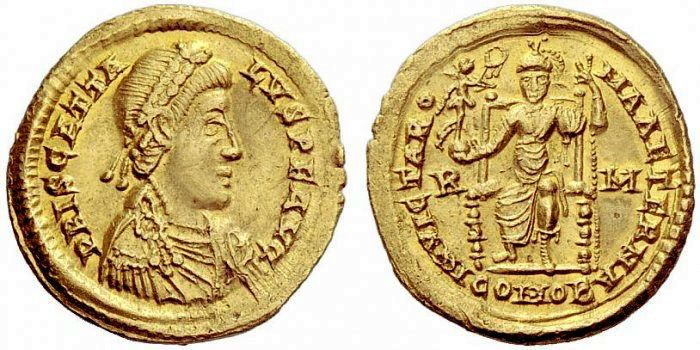
A solidus of Priscus Attalus with the phrase Roma invicta on the back

Roma invicta is a Latin phrase meaning "undefeated Rome". It was an inspirational motto used until the Fall of the Western Roman Empire in 476 AD, when Rome was conquered by the Goths. This symbolic statement was later printed rarely onto gold coins.

== Other uses ==
Roma Invicta is also a name of a building which showcases the vestiges of Mussolini's Rome.
