= Flag of Kent =

Flag of English county

Kent
- Other names: Invicta Flag, Invicta Flag of Kent
- Proportion: 3:5
- Adopted: 1800s
- Design: Gules, a horse rampant argent
- Designed by: Traditional
- Use: Variant design

The flag of Kent is the flag of the English county of Kent. It features the white horse of Kent on a red background, a theme used in several other Kent-related coats of arms and logos or symbols. It is sometimes referred to as the Invicta Flag or Invicta Flag of Kent, after the motto of Kent, Invicta.

The flag is an adaptation of what was thought to be the traditional arms of Kent as popularised by Richard Verstegen's 1605 work, A Restitution of Decayed Intelligence. These arms were attributed anachronistically to the Kingdom of Kent, but used by the Justices of Kent for many years. The design did not catch on as a symbol of the modern county of Kent until the mid-18th century and did not appear in flag form until the 19th century. The arms were officially granted to Kent County Council on 17 October 1933 (and re-confirmed to its successor in 1975). The flag was accepted by the Flag Institute as that of the historic county on the basis of its traditional use.

== Design ==
The design shows a white horse rearing on its hind legs on a red field. The horse is known as the White Horse of Kent, and though its origins are disagreed upon, it has its roots partly in Germanic heraldry, as a similar design was seen on the flag of the Electorate of Hanover, and is seen today on the coats of arms of Lower Saxony, North Rhine-Westphalia, and the Dutch region of Twente.

=== Colours ===
The colours of the Kentish flag are:

Scheme	Red	White
Pantone (paper)	186 C	Safe
HEX	#C8102E	#FFFFFF
CMYK	0, 100, 80, 5	0, 0, 0, 0
RGB	200, 16, 46	255, 255, 255

== History ==
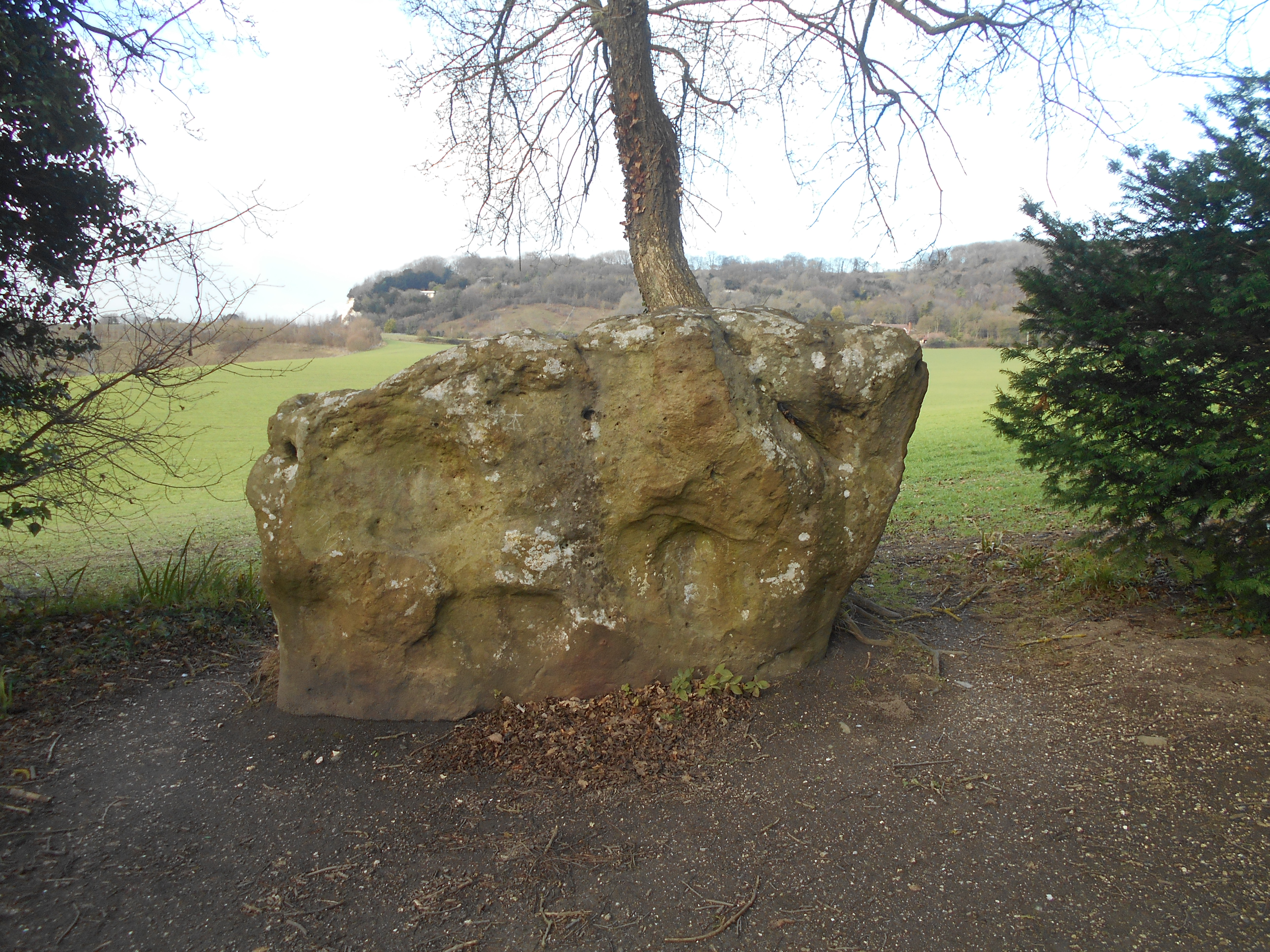
The White Horse Stone, near Aylesford, Kent, allegedly named for the flag of Hengist and Horsa.

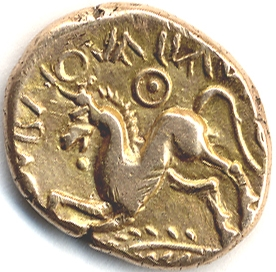
The reverse side of a Cantiaci coin, with a horse.

The origin of the horse as a symbol for Kent is unknown, but a common story relates to the Jutes, post-Roman settlers in England from modern-day Denmark. Historians such as the Venerable Bede describe the leaders of the Jutes to have been brothers named Hengist and Horsa, derived from the Old English words for "stallion" and "horse" respectively. However, records of the existence of these brothers do not arise until writings from the 9th century, though the Jutish invasion is said to have begun in the 5th, and many today believe them to be legendary. That said, they purportedly flew a banner of a white horse, and a sandstone megalith known as the White Horse Stone in Aylesford is said to have been erected in the name of Horsa.

Another theory is that the horse originated from the design stamped on the currency of several pre-Roman English kings, such as Dubnovellaunus of the Cantiaci, the tribe from which Kent possibly derives its name. Historian James Lloyd equates the White Horse of Kent with the Saxon Steed, a continental emblem, though suggesting the two symbols derive from a common root rather than the one from the other. The continental emblem can be found from the coat of arms of Lower Saxony, the Dutch region of Twente, and the House of Welf, who adapted it in the late 14th century. Lloyd confirms the existence of a Celtic horse cult in pre-Roman Kent; and points out that the Saxon emblem of the brother's time was the dragon, and that Kent was a Jutish, rather than a Saxon kingdom. He further suggests the Saxon Steed motif was invented in the 14th century "as a faux ancient symbol for the Saxons", being derived from an account by Gobelinus of the myth of Hengist and Horsa in Britain, thus tracing both emblems independently to the same source.

Richard Verstegan's work A Restitution of Decayed Intelligence is the earliest record in print of Kent's flag being a banner with a horse charge, which is illustrated being carried by Hengist and Horsa as they invade Great Britain. John Speed referenced the horse as a symbol of Kent in his writings several times, though showed the flag not to be just a horse banner but the shield and crown on the flag too.

=== Hanoverian horse ===
The Saxon Steed, a depiction of a similar horse running, became widespread in coats of arms of various houses across Europe in the 15th and 16th centuries, including the House of Hanover, leading to its use in the flag of the Electorate of Hanover. Further, George I, who was ruler of Hanover took the British throne in 1714, leading the horse to become a more widespread symbol in Britain. The Kentish Post, a local newspaper, began use the horse next to the title on its front page in 1722, a practice continued by local papers to this day. In the 18th century the British military began wearing the symbol of the Hanoverian horse, and the East Kent Militia wore a rearing one, in reference to their symbol. Since George was Protestant, and Kent was a Protestant county, the proliferation of horse imagery was popular there. Over the 18th and 19th centuries, more and more public bodies in Kent began using the horse as their symbol, such as the insurance office and fire department.

=== Modern use ===
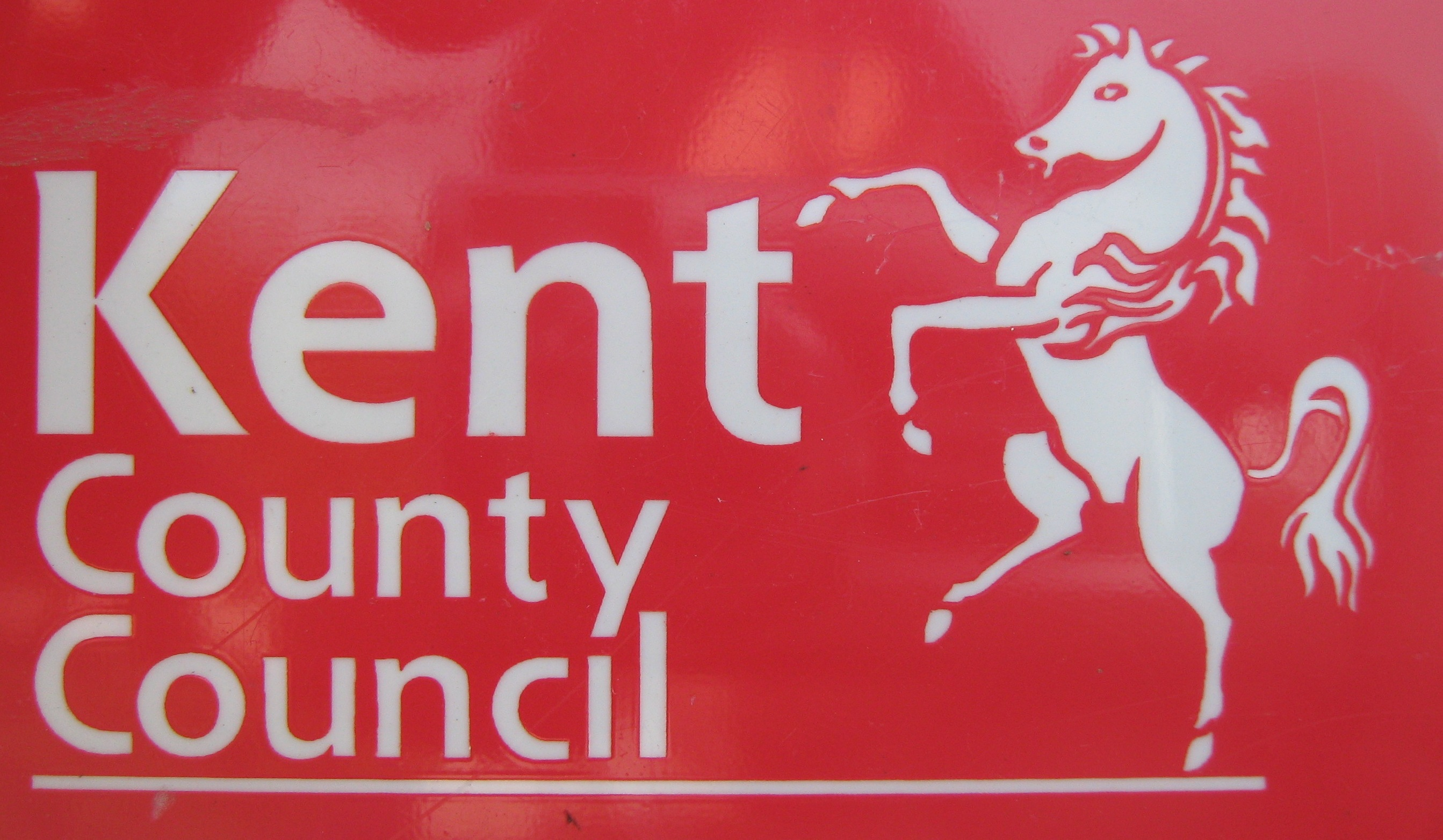
Logo of Kent County Council

Kent county council began officially using the rearing horse on their coat of arms in 1933, and would often be printed with the county slogan "invicta" underneath it. Some hypothesise that modern use of the simple white-horse-on-red design was first used by the Kent County Cricket Club, and footage of a game against Sussex in 1913 clearly shows the flag flying over the grounds.

Two flags were used in World War 2 by the No. 131 Squadron RAF, the Kentish Squadron - one that bore the "invicta" motto and one with the white horse of Kent on it.

Today, the Kent County Council's logo uses a simplified version of the horse on a red background as their logo.

== Protocol and use ==
According to terms published by the Kent County Council in 2013, the Union Jack and Kentish flag are to be flown together upon the occasion of any royal visits.

== See also ==
- List of flags of the United Kingdom
- List of English flags
- Twente
