= Invicta (motto) =

Motto of Kent

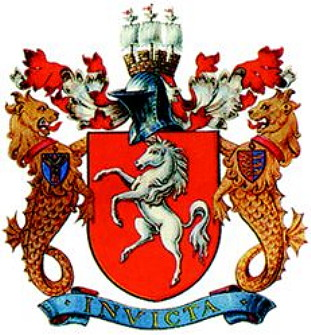
Arms of Kent County Council

Invicta is a Latin word meaning invincible, undefeated, or unconquered. It has been used in mottoes like Roma invicta (Latin for "Unconquered Rome"), and it is the motto of the county of Kent, England.

== Theories of origin ==
"Invicta" has been a motto for centuries. Roma invicta is a Latin phrase, meaning "Unconquered Rome", inscribed on a statue in Rome. It was an inspirational motto used until the fall of the Western Roman Empire in 476 AD. This symbolic statement was later printed onto gold coins, to help boost the morale of the failing Empire.

For Kent, it dates back to the invasion of England by Duke William of Normandy in the year 1066. As the official motto, it appears on the coat of arms of Kent County Council.

Leaving the battle site at Hastings, William marched on to London on his way to the (then) capital Winchester. While passing through Kent, the local people attacked and harassed William's men. The uncertain William and his army fled and went a different route to London. As the people of Kent had chased William away, they adopted "Invicta" as a county motto.

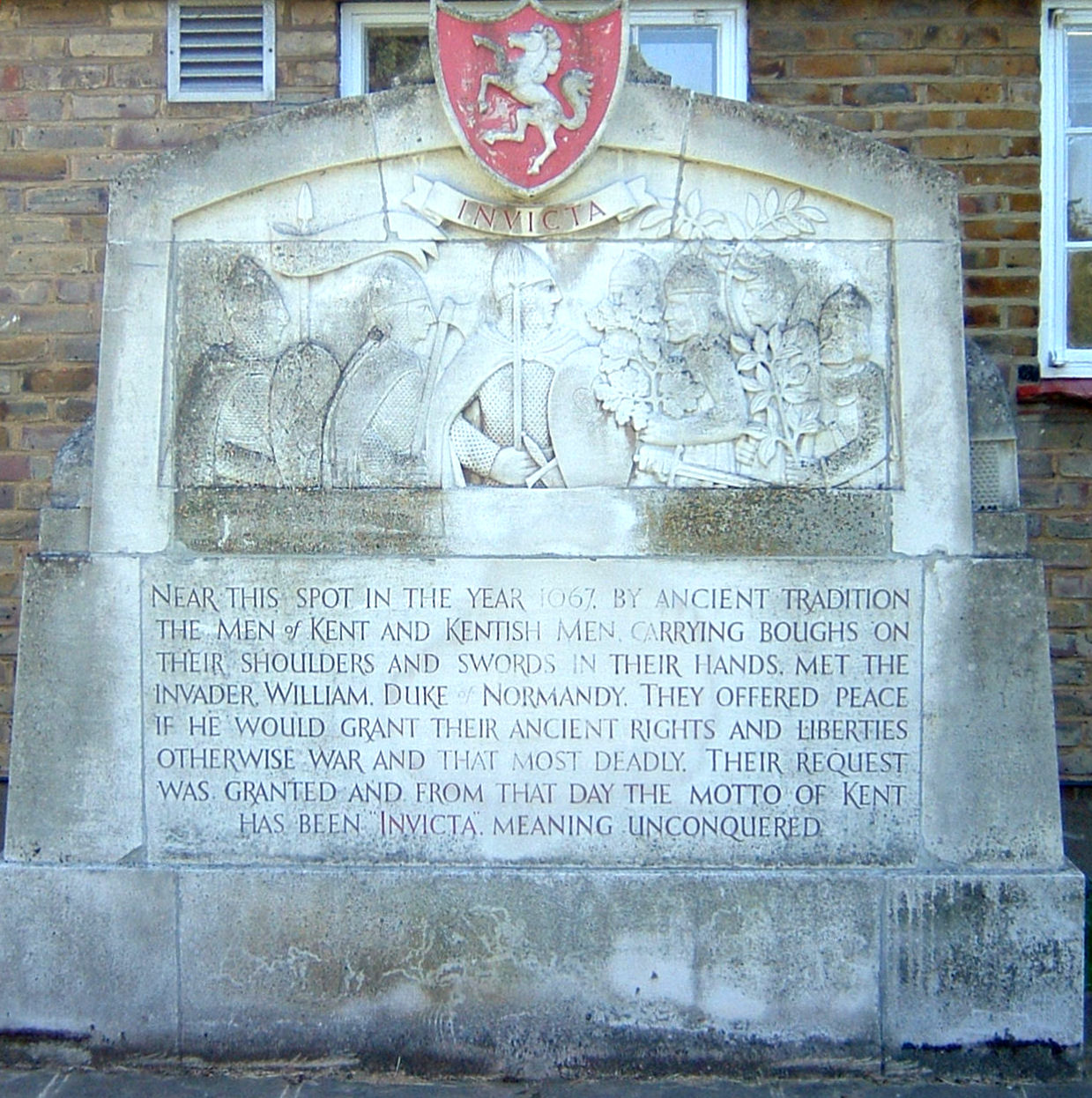
Kent Invicta monument

A different version of the legend above is depicted on a monument at Swanscombe, where legend states this meeting took place on the Old Roman Road to London (Watling Street). The monument, sculpted by Hilary Stratton and unveiled in 1958, was moved in the early 1960s due to the construction of the A2 dual carriageway. It is now located in the churchyard of St Peter and St Paul's Church in Swanscombe, where the picture (right) was taken.

The monument states that:

Near this spot by ancient tradition the men of Kent and Kentish men carrying boughs on their shoulders and swords in their hands met the invader William Duke of Normandy. They offered peace if he would grant their ancient rights and liberties otherwise war and that most deadly. Their request was granted and from that day the motto of Kent has been INVICTA meaning Unconquered.

Because Dover and Kent were not besieged or defeated on William's march, but instead the people demanded and received preservation of their rights in exchange for acknowledging his kingship and peace, they were therefore not conquered by him. Holding of land in Kent by gavelkind, rather than the Norman laws of primogeniture, lasted until the early-20th century suggesting that the people of Kent were successful in maintaining their rights.

== Local influences ==
As the motto of the county, "Invicta" is now a frequently used term within Kent.

== Other uses ==
"Cidade Invicta" ("Unvanquished City") is coined of the city of Porto, Portugal. It was earned during the Napoleonic invasions in the 19th century.

== See also ==
- Roman Empire
- Flag of Kent, sometimes referred to as the "Invicta Flag"
- White horse of Kent, a symbol closely associated with Kent, sometimes referred to as "Invicta"
- Invictus, a British poem
