= Invicta Ground =

Former football stadium in Plumstead, London

Coordinates: 51°29′15″N 0°05′17″E

- Interactive map of Invicta Ground
- Full name: Invicta Ground
- Location: Plumstead, London, England
- Owner: George Weaver
- Capacity: c.12,000

Construction
- Opened: 1890
- Closed: c. 1894
- Demolished: ?

Tenants
- Woolwich Arsenal (1890–1893); Royal Ordnance Factories (1893–1894)

The Invicta Ground was a football stadium in Plumstead, south-east London, that was the home of club Royal Arsenal, now known as Arsenal.

== History ==
Named after Invicta, the motto of the county of Kent, the ground was Arsenal's first proper stadium, being equipped with a stand, a row of terracing and changing rooms. The arena stood on the south side of Plumstead High Street with Arsenal's old home, the Manor Ground, which was upon the opposite side of high street and north of the railway lines, being much smaller by contrast.

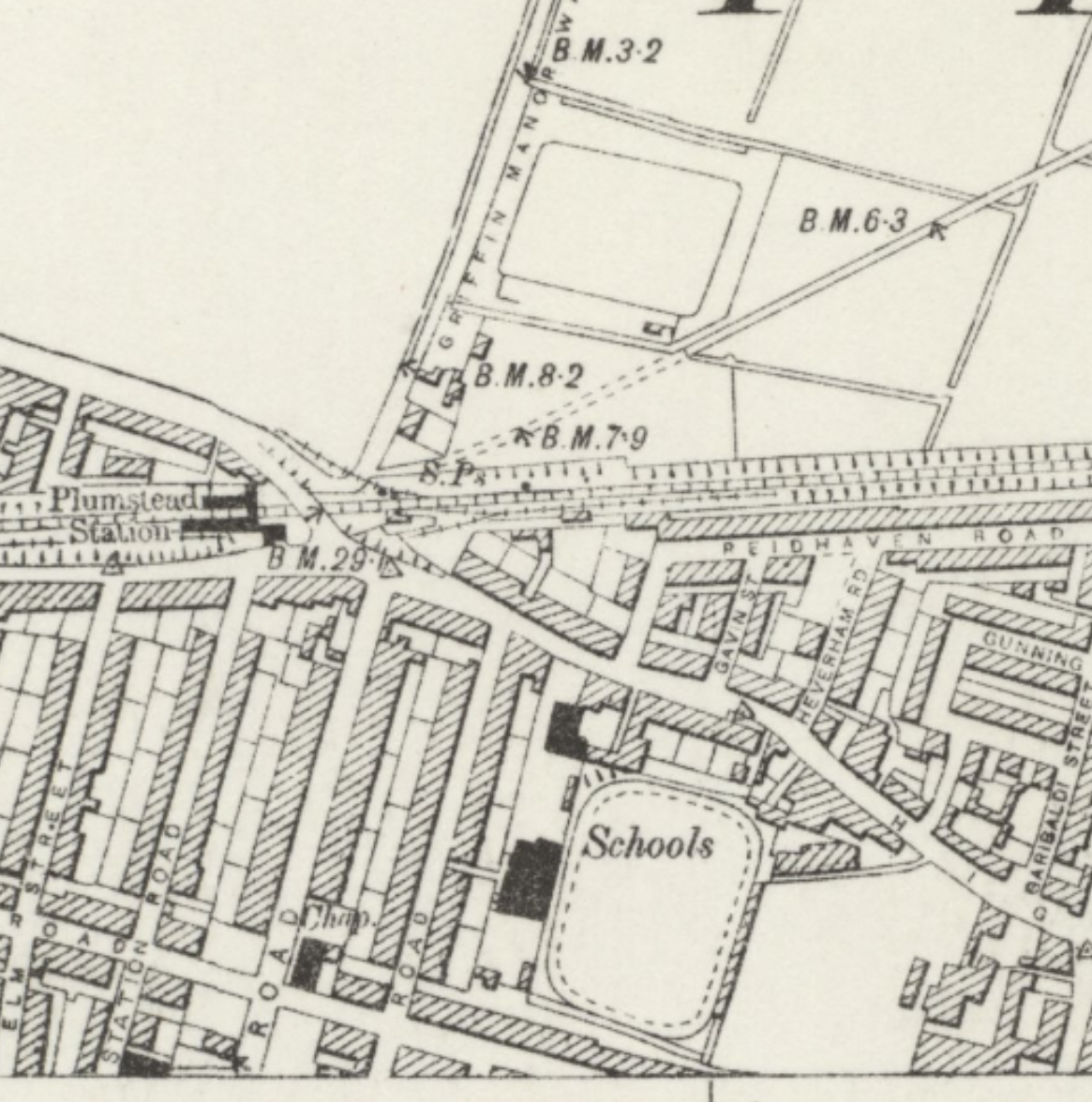
Location of Invicta Ground, south of Plumstead High Street (1899), with Manor Ground to the north

When Royal Arsenal first moved to the Invicta Ground, they were an amateur team with a following of only about 1,000, but within a year the club had turned professional and had renamed themselves Woolwich Arsenal. They started to attract much larger crowds, including a record 12,000 for a match against the then Scottish Cup holders Heart of Midlothian on 30 March 1891, which Woolwich Arsenal lost 5–1.

Woolwich Arsenal intended to use the Invicta for 1893–94, their first season playing in the Football League. However, the ground's owner, George Weaver (a mineral water magnate), wishing to make the most out of the rise in Arsenal's fortunes, put the annual rent up from £200 to £350, a sum which the club could not afford. Arsenal returned to the Manor Ground, which they bought outright after a share issue, and spent the summer of 1893 building proper stands and facilities.

An amateur side, Royal Ordnance Factories, set up in response to Woolwich Arsenal joining the League, played some home games in the Invicta Ground. However, they had left by late 1894 and Weaver could not find a permanent tenant for the ground. He eventually demolished it, building houses on the site. Today Mineral Street and Hector Street stand where the stadium used to be; some of the stadium's concrete terracing still survives in the back gardens of houses in Hector Street.
