= Invictus (disambiguation) =

Invictus (Latin for "unconquered") may refer to:

"Invictus" is a short poem by William Ernest Henley.

Invictus may also refer to:

== Music ==
- "Invictus", Edwardian setting of the poem by composer Bruno Siegfried Huhn
- Invictus (Virgin Steele album), 1998
- Invictus (George Kollias album), 2015
- Invictus (Iconoclast III), a 2010 album by Heaven Shall Burn
- "Invictus", a composition for band by Karl King
- Invictus Records, a record label operating between 1968 and 1977
- Invictus: A Passion, a 2018 choral work by Howard Goodall

== Video gaming ==
- Invictus: In the Shadow of Olympus, a 2000 videogame
- Invictus (Vampire: The Requiem), a covenant in the role-playing game Vampire: The Requiem
- Invictus Games (company), a PC games company dedicated to the racing genre
- Invictus Gaming, an eSports team

== Other uses ==
- Invictus (film), a 2009 biographical sport drama film
- Invictus Games, an international sporting event for wounded soldiers
- Invictus (epithet), a Latin epithet for various Roman deities meaning "unconquered, invincible"
- Invictus (novel), a 2016 Eagles of the Empire novel by Simon Scarrow
- "Invictus", a 2018 television special continuation of the animated series 12 oz. Mouse
- Invictus, a character from the American animated series Final Space
- Invictus, a reusable spaceplane under development, funded by the ESA
- Bell 360 Invictus, a proposed U.S. military helicopter

== See also ==
- Sol Invictus (disambiguation)
- Invicta (disambiguation)
