= Radio 390 =

Former British pirate radio station

Radio 390 (1965–1967) was a pirate radio station on Red Sands Fort, (near Whitstable), a former Maunsell Fort on the Red Sands sandbar in the River Thames estuary.

Previously the fort had been used by Radio Invicta (c June 1964 – February 1965) and K-I-N-G Radio (March – September 1965). Neither was well-financed or successful, and KING approached Ted Allbeury, who suggested a format based on women's magazines to appeal to housewives.

Radio 390 was named after the station's wavelength, so listeners would know where to tune. The actual wavelength was 388 metres (773 kHz), but 390 was easier to remember. Like its neighbour, Radio City, Radio 390 took advantage of the fort's layout by erecting a 250-foot vertical mast on an inner tower, guyed to three of the outer towers. This, with additional elevation from the height of the towers, gave a stable and efficient antenna, better than ship-based stations, ensuring coverage of southern England with only a 10 kilowatt transmitter. For advertisers, the station claimed 35 kilowatts.

The station's easy listening format was innovative and highly popular with listeners, but criticised by Britain Radio as "Stone Age radio – a series of segmented dirges".

The third season finale episode of Patrick McGoohan's Danger Man (known in the U.S. as Secret Agent) called "Not So Jolly Roger" was filmed on Red Sands Fort in early 1966, when Radio 390 was broadcasting (a year before it shut down). The episode, first broadcast on 7 April of the same year, concerned a pirate radio station that was a front for spies passing on secrets, and included substantial scenes filmed on location at the fort.

== Early years ==
Following Radio Caroline's launch, other pirate broadcasters sought to establish themselves in the Thames estuary by gaining access to abandoned World War II anti-aircraft forts, which were more cost-effective than purchasing ships. In 1964, the Red Sands Fort was claimed by Radio Invicta, which was owned and run by Tom Pepper (a local fisherman whose real name was Harry Featherbee), Charlie Evans (a pub landlord), and John Thompson (a journalist with some radio experience). Radio Invicta commenced test broadcasts around 3 June 1964, and launched with regular transmissions on 17 July of the same year.

Pepper died aged 38 on 16 December 1964, when the small tender David, in which he was sailing back to the mainland, overturned in a sudden squall. Simon Ashley, one of the station's DJs (real name Barry Hoy), and Martin Shaw, an engineer, also drowned, aged 21 and 18, respectively. Pepper's body was later recovered after it washed ashore on Reeves beach, Whitstable; the remains of his companions were never found.

The period involved several incidents of aggression between the rival pirate radio stations; trawlermen hired by Radio Caroline "were firebombed" after failing to heed warnings from Paddy Roy Bates' Radio Essex, and Reginald Calvert, the owner of Radio City, was shot dead by Oliver Smedley, the founder of another competing station, Radio Atlanta. As a result, some suspected foul play in the Radio Invicta deaths, but this was never proved; questions were also raised about the seaworthiness of the David, and the coroner's inquiry returned an open verdict.

Pepper's widow inherited the station. In January 1965, SOS calls were received from the station’s base after food and water supplies became low – the station closed shortly afterwards, in mid-February 1965, but was soon rebranded as K-I-N-G Radio. This was also short-lived, officially closing down on 22 September 1965; however, it continued to broadcast a repeated announcement which advised listeners to retune to 390 metres MW in order to direct them to the new Radio 390 station.

== Legal challenges ==
On 25 November 1966, after a magistrate's court case lasting two days, Radio 390's management was found guilty of illegal broadcasting, fined £100 and ordered to close the station. Shortly after 11pm this was done. An appeal heard by the High Court in December was turned down.

On 31 December the station returned, basing its decision on evidence that the fort was outside territorial waters, contrary to the High Court's claim. A magistrates' court heard the evidence on 22 February 1967, but rejected it next day, fining the company £200 and its directors £40 each. However, the station continued.

On 10 March the Post Office brought a civil action, seeking an injunction to prevent it from broadcasting. This was granted in May, but Radio 390 appealed. The appeal was heard on 28 July, but rejected on the grounds that the Marine Broadcasting Offences Act 1967, would, in any case, have forced the station to close on or before 14 August, 18 days later. Consequently, the station closed for the last time just after 5p.m. with the playing of the national anthem.

On 6 August a group raided the fort and stole equipment, but were arrested shortly afterwards.

== See also ==
- Pirate radio in the United Kingdom
