= Radio Invicta (London) =

Pirate radio station active in the 1970s and 80s

- England
- Broadcast area: London

Programming
- Format: Soul, jazz-funk, electro

History
- First air date: December 1970
- Last air date: July 1984
- Former frequencies: 92.4 FM

Radio Invicta was a pirate radio station that broadcast to London, and was the first of its kind to specialise in playing soul music. It broadcast from December 1970 to July 1984, and was known by its slogan Soul over London and considered itself "Europe's first and only all soul station".

Many of the well known DJs on the soul, funk, and jazz-funk scenes at the time played on the station, including Froggy, Chris Hill, Tony Cleveland, Roger Tate, Derek Holmes, Andy Jackson, Steve Devonne, Steve Chandler, Steve Marshall, Tony Johns, and Herbie (Mastermind Roadshow). The station would also launch the careers of Steve Walsh, Gilles Peterson, and Pete Tong.

Having originally broadcast during the week, the station broadcast solely on bank holidays between 1974 and 1978. From 1978, it then moved to afternoons/evenings every Sunday.

Invicta was featured in a 1982 episode of London Weekend Televisions The London Programme.
