= 40 Years: The Greatest Hits =

Greatest hits album by Spandau Ballet
- Released: 27 November 2020
- Recorded: 1980–1990, 2009, 2014
- Length: 3:44:54
- Label: Parlophone
- Producer: Richard James Burgess; Trevor Horn; Tony Swain; Steve Jolley; Spandau Ballet; Gary Langan; Gary Kemp; Michael Kamen; Danton Supple

Spandau Ballet chronology
| The Story: The Very Best of Spandau Ballet (2014) | 40 Years: The Greatest Hits (2020) |

40 Years: The Greatest Hits is a greatest hits album by the English new wave band Spandau Ballet, released in 2020. The collection includes every song issued as a single by the band to that point, although the original recording of "Instinction" from the 1982 Diamond album was chosen over the hit remix by Trevor Horn. Their 1990 recording of "The Boxer" made its debut here. Other tracks from their first five albums were also included along with several mixes of their hits that were released as 12-inch singles.

== Background ==
The one song on the collection that had not been released before was a cover of Simon and Garfunkel's "The Boxer". After their 1989 album Heart Like a Sky and its four singles performed poorly in the UK, the band decided to record a song under the pretense of beginning to work on a new album in order to receive a payment from their record company. Lead guitarist and songwriter Gary Kemp was not interested in coming up with new material, so they chose to record "The Boxer". (Note: "The last time we'd been in a studio together had been just after coming off of the Heart Like a Sky tour, and was a gruelling experience that we'd all chosen to forget. I'd been in no mood to write another Spandau album and Dagger knew it ... Dagger was rightly worried that we'd not do another album together ever again, and, hoping for the best but planning for the worst, he called to tell me that if we went into the studio we'd trigger a payment from CBS for the advance on the next album. I suggested we find a song to cover rather than face each other in a musical confrontation of personal interests.") Lead singer Tony Hadley thought the song was a bad choice for them and "hated" their recording. (Note: "We worked on the track with a new producer, Michael Kamen. He was a good producer, but I couldn't come to terms with the track. It seemed an unlikely song for Spandau Ballet to cover. In the end, I hated our version. It felt as if we were trying to be something we weren't. Although I was never a big fan of the song, I could see it suited Simon and Garfunkel. It didn't suit us.") In his 2009 autobiography I Know This Much: From Soho to Spandau, Kemp wrote, "The final product was, not surprisingly, bland, with nothing about it that might suddenly reverse Spandau's limp exit from grace."

== Release and commercial performance ==
40 Years: The Greatest Hits was released on 27 November 2020. On 10 December 2020 it spent its first of four weeks on the UK Albums Chart in its peak position at number 15. On 22 March 2024 it received Silver certification from the British Phonographic Industry for reaching 60,000 sales.

== Critical reception ==
Professional ratings
Review scores
| Source | Rating |
|---|---|
| Belfast Telegraph | 7/10 stars |

Alex Green of the Belfast Telegraph wrote that the compilation "shines the spotlight on a band obsessed equally with social commentary and pure, unadulterated pop", and concluded that it "remains both an effective entry point for new listeners and a reminder of Spandau Ballet's surprising breadth."

== Track listing ==
All tracks are written by Gary Kemp, except where noted.

| No. | Title | Original album or single | Length |
|---|---|---|---|
| 1. | "To Cut a Long Story Short" | Journeys to Glory (1981) | 3:20 |
| 2. | "The Freeze" | Journeys to Glory (1981) | 3:32 |
| 3. | "Muscle Bound" | Journeys to Glory (1981) | 3:58 |
| 4. | "Toys" | Journeys to Glory (1981) | 5:46 |
| 5. | "Glow" | 7" single (1981) | 3:48 |
| 6. | "Chant No. 1 (I Don't Need This Pressure On)" | Diamond (1982) | 4:07 |
| 7. | "Paint Me Down" | Diamond (1982) | 3:44 |
| 8. | "Coffee Club" | Diamond (1982) | 5:32 |
| 9. | "She Loved Like Diamond" | Diamond (1982) | 2:52 |
| 10. | "Instinction" | Diamond (1982) | 4:49 |
| 11. | "Lifeline" | True (1983) | 3:34 |
| 12. | "Communication" | True (1983) | 3:40 |
| 13. | "Heaven Is a Secret" | True (1983) | 4:26 |
| 14. | "True" | True (1983) | 5:29 |
| 15. | "Gold" | True (1983) | 4:49 |
| 16. | "Pleasure" | True (1983) | 3:32 |
| 17. | "Only When You Leave" | Parade (1984) | 5:08 |
| 18. | "I'll Fly for You" | Parade (1984) | 5:35 |
| Total length: | | | 1:17:41 |

Disc two
| No. | Title | Writer(s) | Original album | Length |
|---|---|---|---|---|
| 1. | "Highly Strung" | | Parade (1984) | 4:11 |
| 2. | "Revenge for Love" | | Parade (1984) | 4:20 |
| 3. | "Round and Round" | | Parade (1984) | 4:32 |
| 4. | "Fight for Ourselves" | | Through the Barricades (1986) | 4:22 |
| 5. | "Swept" | | Through the Barricades (1986) | 4:53 |
| 6. | "Cross the Line" | | Through the Barricades (1986) | 4:09 |
| 7. | "Through the Barricades" | | Through the Barricades (1986) | 5:52 |
| 8. | "How Many Lies?" | | Through the Barricades (1986) | 4:34 |
| 9. | "Raw" | | Heart Like a Sky (1989) | 3:47 |
| 10. | "Be Free with Your Love" | | Heart Like a Sky (1989) | 4:36 |
| 11. | "Crashed Into Love" | | Heart Like a Sky (1989) | 4:42 |
| 12. | "Empty Spaces" | | Heart Like a Sky (1989) | 3:52 |
| 13. | "The Boxer" | Paul Simon | 40 Years: The Greatest Hits | 4:27 |
| 14. | "Once More" | Kemp, Steve Norman | Once More (2009) | 4:07 |
| 15. | "This Is the Love" | | The Story: The Very Best of Spandau Ballet (2015) | 3:42 |
| 16. | "Soul Boy" | Tony Hadley | The Story (2015) | 3:59 |
| 17. | "Steal" | | The Story (2015) | 4:27 |
| Total length: | | | | 1:14:32 |

All tracks on disc three were taken from the 12" single recordings, except the "Chant No. 1" Remix, which was released with the Diamond 12" box set in 1982.

Disc three
| No. | Title | Length |
|---|---|---|
| 1. | "To Cut a Long Story Short" (Mix 1) | 6:31 |
| 2. | "The Freeze" (Version) | 4:22 |
| 3. | "Glow" (12" Version) | 8:08 |
| 4. | "Chant No. 1" (Remix) | 8:01 |
| 5. | "Paint Me Down" (12" Version) | 7:05 |
| 6. | "Lifeline" (12" Mix) | 5:25 |
| 7. | "Communication" (Club Mix) | 4:26 |
| 8. | "Gold" (Extended Version) | 7:14 |
| 9. | "Fight for Ourselves" (Extended Remix) | 7:27 |
| 10. | "Cross the Line" (Extended Version) | 6:16 |
| 11. | "Raw" (Extended Mix) | 7:46 |
| Total length: | | 1:12:41 |

== Personnel ==
- John Keeble – drums, percussion, backing vocals
- Gary Kemp – lead guitar, keyboards, synthesizers, piano, backing vocals
- Martin Kemp – bass guitar, guitar, backing vocals
- Steve Norman – saxophone, guitar, percussion, keyboards, backing vocals
- Tony Hadley – lead vocals, keyboards, synthesizers, percussion

== Charts ==
Chart performance for 40 Years: The Greatest Hits
| Chart (2020) | Peak position |
|---|---|
| UK Albums (OCC) | 15 |

== Certifications ==
Certifications for 40 Years: The Greatest Hits
| Region | Certification | Certified units/sales |
|---|---|---|
| United Kingdom (BPI) | Silver | 60,000^{‡} |
^{‡} Sales+streaming figures based on certification alone.

== Bibliography ==
- Hadley, Tony (2004). To Cut a Long Story Short. London: Sidgwick & Jackson. ISBN 978-0-283-07386-1.
- Kemp, Gary (2009). I Know This Much: From Soho to Spandau. London: Fourth Estate. ISBN 978-0-00-732330-2.
