= Spandau Ballet discography =

- Studio albums: 7
- Live albums: 1
- Compilation albums: 13
- Singles: 28
- Video albums: 6
- Music videos: 24

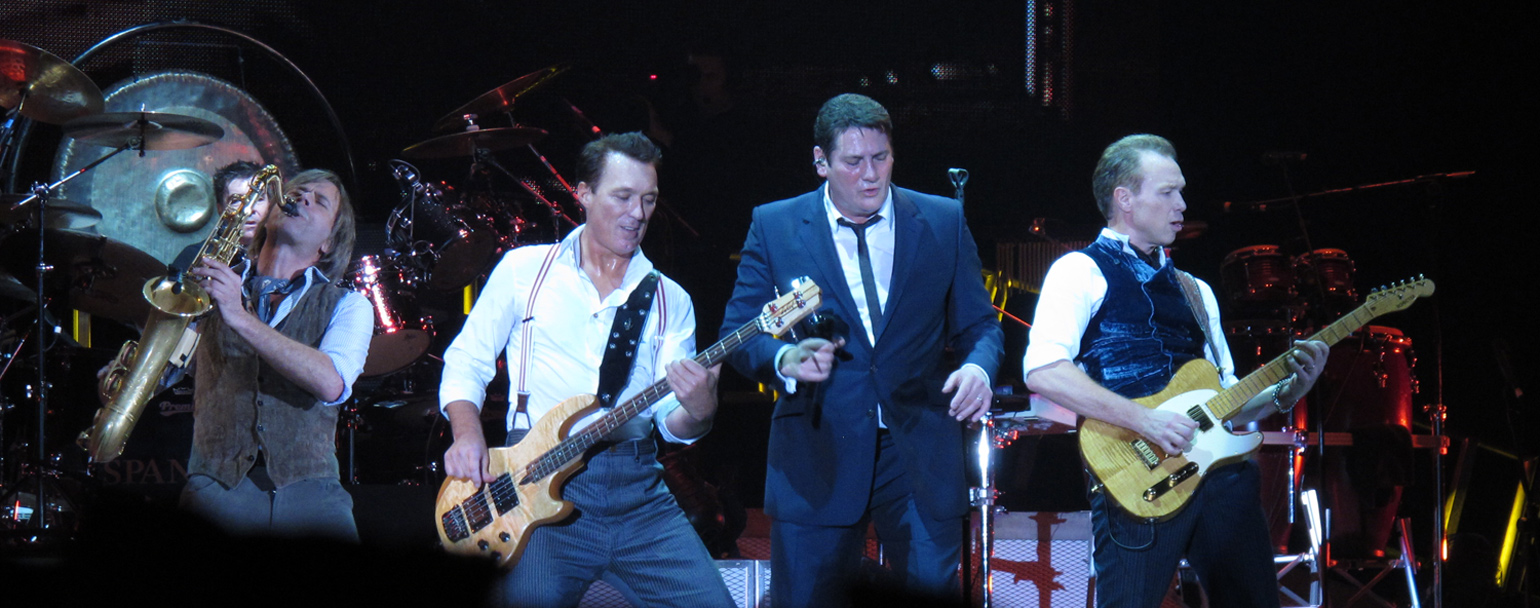
Spandau Ballet in 2009

This is the discography of the English new wave band Spandau Ballet.

== Albums ==
=== Studio albums ===
Title	Album details	Peak chart positions										Certifications
Title	Album details	UK	AUS	CAN	GER	ITA	NED	NZ	SPA	SWE	US	Certifications
Journeys to Glory	Released: 6 March 1981; Label: Chrysalis	5	14	—	—	—	—	12	—	—	—	BPI: Gold
Diamond	Released: 12 March 1982; Label: Chrysalis	15	39	40	—	—	—	9	9	22	—	BPI: Gold
True	Released: 4 March 1983; Label: Chrysalis	1	4	8	8	—	1	1	2	13	19	BPI: Platinum; BVMI: Gold; MC: Platinum; NVPI: Platinum; PROMUSICAE: Gold; RMNZ: Platinum
Parade	Released: 25 June 1984; Label: Chrysalis	2	4	21	7	1	1	8	2	9	50	BPI: Platinum; NVPI: Platinum; RMNZ: Gold
Through the Barricades	Released: 17 November 1986; Label: CBS	7	26	84	9	1	3	48	5	25	—	BPI: Platinum; PROMUSICAE: Gold
Heart Like a Sky	Released: 18 September 1989; Label: CBS	31	96	—	29	5	27	—	35	47	—	PROMUSICAE: Gold
Once More	Released: 19 October 2009; Label: Mercury	7	—	—	30	17	46	—	34	—	—	BPI: Gold; FIMI: Gold
"—" denotes items that did not chart or were not released in that territory.

=== Compilation albums ===
Title	Album details	Peak chart positions										Certifications
Title	Album details	UK	AUS	BEL	IRE	ITA	NED	NZ	SCO	SPA	SWE	Certifications
The Singles Collection	Released: 4 November 1985; Label: Chrysalis	3	3	—	—	—	17	2	—	9	—	BPI: 2× Platinum; RMNZ: Platinum
The Twelve Inch Mixes	Released: 30 June 1986; Label: Chrysalis	—	98	—	—	—	—	—	—	—	—	
The Best of Spandau Ballet	Released: 16 September 1991; Label: Chrysalis	44	41	—	—	—	15	—	—	—	—	BPI: Silver
Musclebound	Released: 1996; Label: Disky	—	—	—	—	—	—	—	—	—	—	
The Collection	Released: 14 April 1997; Label: EMI	—	—	—	—	—	—	—	—	—	—	
Original Gold	Released: August 2000; Label: Disky	—	—	—	—	—	—	—	—	—	—	
Gold: The Best of Spandau Ballet	Released: 4 September 2000; Label: Capitol	7	158	—	44	38	40	—	10	40	30	BPI: Platinum; PROMUSICAE: Gold
Reformation	Released: 2 September 2002; Label: Chrysalis	—	—	—	—	—	—	—	—	—	—	
The Collection II	Released: 1 December 2003; Label: EMI	—	—	—	—	—	—	—	—	—	—	
The Ultra Selection	Released: 2 May 2005; Label: Disky	—	—	—	—	—	—	—	—	—	—	
Singles, Rarities & Remixes	Released: 11 December 2006; Label: EMI	—	—	—	—	—	—	—	—	—	—	
The Story – The Very Best of Spandau Ballet	Released: 13 October 2014; Label: Rhino	8	22	102	26	24	—	13	9	54	—	BPI: Gold
40 Years: The Greatest Hits	Released: 27 November 2020; Label: Warner	15	—	—	—	—	—	—	—	—	—	BPI: Silver
"—" denotes items that did not chart or were not released in that territory.

=== Live albums ===
Title	Album details
Live from the N.E.C.	Released: 3 October 2005; Label: Sony BMG

== Singles ==
Title	Year	Peak chart positions											Certifications	Album
Title	Year	UK	AUS	BEL	CAN	GER	IRE	ITA	NED	NZ	SPA	US	Certifications	Album
"To Cut a Long Story Short"	1980	5	15	—	—	—	9	—	—	38	19	— (Note: "To Cut a Long Story Short" did not enter the US Hot 100, but peaked at number 28 on the US Dance Club Songs chart.)	BPI: Silver	Journeys to Glory
"The Freeze"	1981	17	—	—	—	—	14	—	—	—	16	—		Journeys to Glory
"Muscle Bound" / "Glow"	1981	10	97	—	—	—	18	—	32	—	—	— (Note: "Glow" peaked at number 62 on the US Dance Club Songs chart.)		Journeys to Glory
"Chant No. 1 (I Don't Need This Pressure On)"	1981	3	30	—	—	—	9	—	32	36	27	— (Note: "Chant No. 1 (I Don't Need This Pressure On)" did not enter the US Hot 100, but peaked at number 17 on the US Dance Club Songs chart.)	BPI: Silver	Diamond
"Paint Me Down"	1981	30	—	—	—	—	—	—	—	—	—	—		Diamond
"She Loved Like Diamond"	1982	49	—	—	—	—	—	—	—	—	—	—		Diamond
"Instinction"	1982	10	35	—	—	—	20	—	—	—	—	—		Diamond
"Lifeline"	1982	7	68	—	—	—	11	—	—	33	—	108		True
"Communication"	1983	12	24	—	—	—	13	—	—	10	—	59		True
"True"	1983	1	4	9	1	9	1	34	5	4	3	4	BPI: Platinum; MC: Gold	True
"Gold"	1983	2	9	3	12	16	4	—	3	8	4	29	BPI: Platinum	True
"Pleasure" (Europe-only release)	1983	—	—	32	—	61	—	—	27	—	—	—		True
"Only When You Leave"	1984	3	12	5	23	26	2	32	3	10	4	34		Parade
"I'll Fly for You"	1984	9	38	—	—	—	10	6	28	35	—	—		Parade
"Highly Strung"	1984	15	83	—	—	—	18	—	36	46	—	—		Parade
"Round and Round"	1984	18	16	—	—	—	9	11	37	—	14	—		Parade
"Fight for Ourselves"	1986	15	16	20	—	32	7	5	18	33	11	—		Through the Barricades
"Through the Barricades"	1986	6	50	10	—	14	4	1	4	—	2	—	BPI: Silver	Through the Barricades
"How Many Lies?"	1987	34	—	25	86	—	17	5	23	—	32	—		Through the Barricades
"Cross the Line" (Netherlands and Spain-only release)	1987	—	—	—	—	—	—	—	—	—	—	—		Through the Barricades
"Raw"	1988	47	79	22	—	—	—	11	23	—	—	—		Heart Like a Sky
"Be Free with Your Love"	1989	42	110	37	—	52	—	11	44	—	—	—		Heart Like a Sky
"Empty Spaces"	1989	94	—	—	—	—	—	—	—	—	—	—		Heart Like a Sky
"Crashed Into Love"	1990	96	—	—	—	—	—	28	—	—	—	—		Heart Like a Sky
"Once More"	2009	82	—	—	—	—	—	—	—	—	—	—		Once More
"This Is the Love"	2014	—	—	—	—	—	—	—	—	—	—	— (Note: "This Is the Love" did not enter the US Hot 100, but peaked at number 20 on the US Dance Club Songs chart.)		The Story – The Very Best of Spandau Ballet
"Steal"	2014	—	—	—	—	—	—	—	—	—	—	— (Note: "Steal" did not enter the US Hot 100, but peaked at number 30 on the US Adult Contemporary chart.)		The Story – The Very Best of Spandau Ballet
"Soul Boy"	2015	—	—	—	—	—	—	—	—	—	—	—		The Story – The Very Best of Spandau Ballet
"—" denotes items that did not chart or were not released in that territory.

== Videography ==
=== Video albums ===
Title	Video details
Over Britain Live in London!	Released: 1983; Label: Chrysalis; Formats: VHS, Laserdisc, Betamax
Through the Barricades... Across the Borders	Released: 1987; Label: CBS Fox Video; Format: VHS
The Video Collection	Released: 1987; Label: Chrysalis; Formats: VHS, Laserdisc
Live	Released: 1991; Label: Castle Music Pictures; Formats: VHS, Laserdisc, DVD
The Best of Spandau Ballet	Released: 1991; Label: Picture Music International; Format: VHS
The Reformation Tour 2009: Live at The O2	Released: 2009; Label: Universal; Format: DVD

=== Music videos ===
Year	Title	Album
1980	"To Cut a Long Story Short"	Journeys to Glory
1980	"The Freeze"	Journeys to Glory
1981	"Muscle Bound"	Journeys to Glory
1981	"Chant No. 1 (I Don't Need This Pressure On)"	Diamond
1981	"Paint Me Down"	Diamond
1981	"She Loved Like Diamond"	Diamond
1982	"Instinction"	Diamond
1982	"Lifeline"	True
1982	"Communication"	True
1983	"True"	True
1983	"Gold"	True
1984	"Only When You Leave"	Parade
1984	"I'll Fly for You"	Parade
1984	"Highly Strung"	Parade
1984	"Round and Round"	Parade
1986	"Fight for Ourselves"	Through the Barricades
1986	"Through the Barricades"	Through the Barricades
1986	"How Many Lies?"	Through the Barricades
1988	"Raw"	Heart Like a Sky
1989	"Be Free with Your Love"	Heart Like a Sky
1989	"Crashed into Love"	Heart Like a Sky
2009	"Once More"	Once More
2014	"Steal"	The Story – The Very Best of Spandau Ballet
2015	"Soul Boy"	The Story – The Very Best of Spandau Ballet
