= The Story: The Very Best of Spandau Ballet =

Greatest hits album by Spandau Ballet
- Released: 13 October 2014
- Recorded: 1980–1989, 2009, 2014
- Length: 1:20:48 (standard edition); 2:39:34 (deluxe edition)
- Label: Reformation; Rhino
- Producer: Richard James Burgess; Trevor Horn; Tony Swain; Steve Jolley; Spandau Ballet; Gary Langan; Gary Kemp; Danton Supple

Spandau Ballet chronology
Once More (2009)	The Story: The Very Best of Spandau Ballet (2014)	40 Years: The Greatest Hits (2020)

Singles from The Story
- 1. "This Is the Love" Released: October 2014; 2. "Steal" Released: 2014; 3. "Soul Boy" Released: 2015

The Story: The Very Best of Spandau Ballet is a greatest hits album by the English new wave band Spandau Ballet, released on 13 October 2014. The compilation included three new songs that were produced by Trevor Horn. It reached number eight on the UK Albums Chart.

== Background ==
Spandau Ballet reunited for a tour in 2009 after being apart for almost twenty years. The success of the tour led to the re-recording of their hits for an acoustic album titled Once More. Two new songs were included, one of which, the title track, reached number 82 on the UK Singles Chart, making it their first chart appearance there since 1990.

On 31 July 2014 the band announced on their website that they were "working on new material with Trevor Horn", with whom they had last worked on the 1984 charity song "Do They Know It's Christmas?" Horn also remixed Spandau Ballet's Diamond track "Instinction" in 1982. On 18 August of that year, a post on their website explained that the new material consisted of three tracks to be released in October on a compilation titled The Story: The Very Best of Spandau Ballet.

On 1 October 2014 a documentary telling the story of Spandau Ballet, which was titled Soul Boys of the Western World, had its premiere at the Royal Albert Hall in London.

== Release and commercial performance ==
The Story: The Very Best of Spandau Ballet was released on 13 October 2014. It debuted on the UK Albums Chart on 25 October and spent 14 weeks there, during which time it peaked at number 8. It also got as high as number 9 in Scotland, number 13 in New Zealand, number 22 in Australia, number 24 in Italy, number 26 in Ireland, number 54 in Spain, number 102 in Belgium and number 281 in Japan.

== Reception ==
Timothy Monger of AllMusic said, "The real draw here is the addition of three new songs recorded with legendary producer Trevor Horn", who, in his opinion, returned the band to its "classic, soulful" sound on these tracks.

== Track listing ==
All tracks are written by Gary Kemp, except where noted.

No.	Title	Original album	Length
1.	"To Cut a Long Story Short"	Journeys to Glory (1981)	3:22
2.	"The Freeze"	Journeys to Glory (1981)	3:32
3.	"Muscle Bound"	Journeys to Glory (1981)	3:58
4.	"Chant No. 1 (I Don't Need This Pressure On)"	Diamond (1982)	4:08
5.	"Instinction"	Diamond (1982)	3:36
6.	"Lifeline"	True (1983)	3:34
7.	"Communication"	True (1983)	3:40
8.	"True"	True (1983)	5:40
9.	"Gold"	True (1983)	3:54
10.	"Only When You Leave"	Parade (1984)	5:10
11.	"I'll Fly for You"	Parade (1984)	5:36
12.	"Highly Strung"	Parade (1984)	4:11
13.	"Round and Round"	Parade (1984)	4:33
14.	"Fight for Ourselves"	Through the Barricades (1986)	4:23
15.	"Through the Barricades"	Through the Barricades (1986)	5:23
16.	"Once More" (Kemp, Steve Norman)	Once More (2009)	4:08
17.	"This Is the Love"	The Story (2015)	3:44
18.	"Steal"	The Story (2015)	4:28
19.	"Soul Boy" (Tony Hadley)	The Story (2015)	3:48
Total length:			1:20:48

The Story – Deluxe edition (bonus disc tracks)
No.	Title	Original album or single	Length
1.	"Confused" (*)	Journeys to Glory (1981)	4:39
2.	"Toys" (*)	Journeys to Glory (1981)	5:48
3.	"Mandolin" (*)	Journeys to Glory (1981)	4:07
4.	"Age of Blows" (*)	Journeys to Glory (1981)	4:11
5.	"Glow" (7" Version) (*)	7" single (1981)	3:49
6.	"Chant No. 1" (Re-mix) (*)	Diamond (1982)	8:03
7.	"Pharaoh" (*)	Diamond (1982)	6:40
8.	"Paint Me Down" (*)	Diamond (1982)	3:45
9.	"She Loved Like Diamond" (*)	Diamond (1982)	2:53
10.	"Code of Love" (**)	True (1983)	5:12
11.	"Pleasure" (**)	True (1983)	3:34
12.	"I'll Fly for You" (Glide Mix) (*)	Parade (1984)	7:18
13.	"How Many Lies?"	Through the Barricades (1986)	4:36
14.	"Man in Chains"	Through the Barricades (1986)	5:41
15.	"Be Free with Your Love"	Heart Like a Sky (1989)	4:41
16.	"Raw"	Heart Like a Sky (1989)	3:49
Total length:			1:18:46

*2010 Remastered Version
**2003 Remastered Version

== Personnel ==
- John Keeble – drums, percussion, backing vocals
- Gary Kemp – lead guitar, keyboards, synthesizers, piano, backing vocals
- Martin Kemp – bass guitar, guitar, backing vocals
- Steve Norman – saxophone, guitar, percussion, keyboards, backing vocals
- Tony Hadley – lead vocals, keyboards, synthesizers, percussion

== Charts ==
Chart performance for The Story: The Very Best of Spandau Ballet
Chart (2014–2015)	Peak position
Australian Albums (ARIA)	22
Belgian Albums (Ultratop Flanders)	102
Irish Albums (IRMA)	26
Italian Albums (FIMI)	24
Japanese Albums (Oricon)	281
New Zealand Albums (RMNZ)	13
Scottish Albums (OCC)	9
Spanish Albums (Promusicae)	54
UK Albums (OCC)	8

== Certifications ==
Certifications for The Story: The Very Best of Spandau Ballet
Region	Certification	Certified units/sales
United Kingdom (BPI)	Gold	100,000^{‡}
^{‡} Sales+streaming figures based on certification alone.
