= The Ultra Selection =

The Ultra Selection may refer to:

- The Ultra Selection (Mantronix album), 2005
- The Ultra Selection (Spandau Ballet album), 2005
