= Original Gold =

"Original Gold" may refer to:

- Original Gold (Kenny Rogers album), a 1998 album by Kenny Rogers
- Original Gold: Kim Wilde, a 1998 album by Kim Wilde
- Original Gold (Kim Wilde album), a 1999 album by Kim Wilde
- Original Gold (Spandau Ballet album), a 1999 album by Spandau Ballet
