= Gold (Spandau Ballet song) =

Single by Spandau Ballet

from the album True
- B-side: "Gold" (Instrumental)
- Released: 5 August 1983
- Recorded: October–December 1982
- Genre: Synth-pop; sophisti-pop; new wave
- Length: 3:51 (single version); 4:51 (album version); 7:12 (extended version)
- Label: Chrysalis
- Songwriter: Gary Kemp
- Producers: Tony Swain; Steve Jolley; Spandau Ballet

Spandau Ballet singles chronology
"True" (1983)	"Gold" (1983)	"Pleasure" (1983)

Music video
- Spandau Ballet – "Gold" (single version) on YouTube

Audio
- Spandau Ballet – "Gold" (album version) on YouTube

"Gold" is a song by the English new wave band Spandau Ballet, released on 5 August 1983 in the UK and on 1 November 1983 in the US as the fourth single from their third album, True. The song was written by the band's guitarist/songwriter Gary Kemp as an homage to the film themes of composer John Barry and was especially influenced by his scores for the James Bond series. This was apparent to some music critics, but they were sharply divided in their reviews. Some appreciated the energy and drama behind it, while others found it affected and overwrought. The song peaked at number two on the UK singles chart and made the top 10 in several other countries, but its number 29 showing in the US and the disappointing chart performances of the next two singles released there led to the band's decision to change record labels.

== Background ==
In 1981, Spandau Ballet guitarist/songwriter Gary Kemp wrote "She Loved Like Diamond", which became the third single from the band's second album, Diamond, and attempted to emulate the American Jewish music with an Eastern European feel that he had heard in movie themes and musicals. Its number 49 showing on the UK Singles Chart was the lowest peak position of any of the songs they had released up until that point, so Kemp made another attempt with "Gold". In a Mastertapes interview in 2013, John Wilson asked if he heard the song as dramatically as it turned out while writing it, and Kemp admitted wanting to write a movie theme in the same vein as John Barry because of his work on the James Bond films, and the title being inspired by Shirley Bassey's 1964 Bond theme "Goldfinger". Kemp and his brother, Martin, who was the bassist for the band, were still living with their parents when he was writing the song, and Kemp called him in to listen to what he had written and play along on bass. He was relieved that Martin loved this particular song so much.

"Gold" did not capture the attention of the producers that Spandau Ballet decided to try working with on their next album, which would eventually be titled True. They initially chose Trevor Horn, who was most intrigued by the song "Pleasure" but wanted to replace drummer John Keeble, which Kemp refused to do. When their manager, Steve Dagger, suggested producers Tony Swain and Steve Jolley, the band decided to have them initially produce one of the new songs Kemp had written to see how things went. The duo were most impressed by "Communication" and "Lifeline", the latter of which they worked on as the first single from True.

Swain and Jolley were hired to do the rest of the album and the music for most of its songs was recorded at Compass Point Studios in the Bahamas. Recording lead singer Tony Hadley's vocals and mixing of the tracks took place after their return, in Paddington at Red Bus Studios. When they played the completed album for their record company, the Chrysalis executives liked "Gold", but Dagger wanted to go with something more up-tempo again for the next single, and "Communication" was chosen. The album was released as that song moved up the UK singles chart, and the choice for a third single became obvious when DJs began playing the album version of "True" before "Communication" had finished its upward climb.

Doug D'Arcy, the managing director of Chrysalis UK, was hesitant about putting out a fourth single from the True album, which already had success with its previous three, but the band's manager, Steve Dagger, argued that the momentum for another chart hit was there after having just been at number one in the UK with the title song. Kemp explained to D'Arcy that they would need to do a music video for "Gold" and that he wanted to do something "orchestral" with the 12-inch single instead of the usual dance mix.

== Music video ==
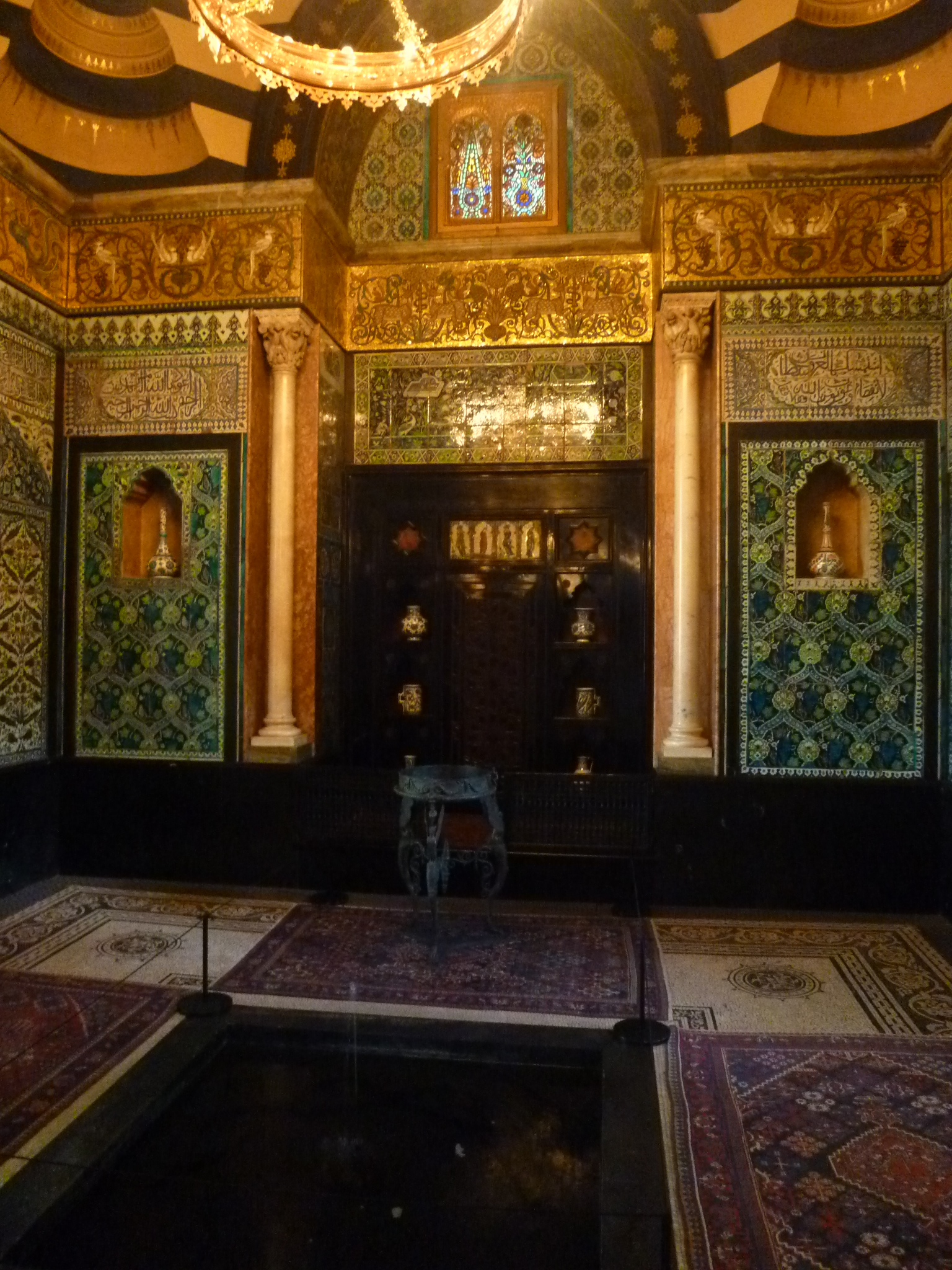
The music video was partially filmed in the Arab Hall at Leighton House Museum.

Brian Duffy was hired to direct the music video for "Gold", part of which was filmed in the Arab Hall of the Leighton House Museum, where Spandau Ballet are shown performing the song. The set had been used a year prior for the Stranglers single Golden Brown. Kemp and Hadley were the only band members who went to the other location shoot, in Carmona, Spain. Kemp described it as "our first travel video and an obvious answer to the epics-from-abroad that Duran was now making."

Hadley played a character who wandered the sun-baked streets and outskirts of town searching for pieces that made up a gold puzzle. Although Kemp did not appear in this footage, he was there to provide input but later felt that his controlling nature was too much for Duffy, who walked off the job without speaking to either of them about it beforehand. Kemp took over his duties for the rest of the shoot there. In his autobiography To Cut a Long Story Short, Hadley wrote that they "ended up working crazy hours to complete it." The video featured Sadie Frost as a gold-painted nymph, in one of her earlier roles, and because it was late into the night by the time they shot the last scene, which involved Hadley taking the last piece of the puzzle from Frost, he had fallen asleep and had to be awakened in order to complete the shoot.

"Gold" was listed on the reports that MTV provided to Billboard that indicated what videos were in rotation on the cable network and made its first appearance there in the 3 December 1983 issue, which indicated that it had been added to their playlist as of 21 November.

== Release and commercial performance ==
"Gold" was released as a 7-inch single in the UK on 5 August 1983 and peaked at number two on the UK Singles Chart, with only KC and the Sunshine Band's "Give It Up" keeping it off the top spot. Hadley felt certain that it would have been number one if they had been available for a live appearance on the British music chart television programme Top of the Pops, but they had already made commitments involving promotional work in Norway. He emphasized that the band was not being "arrogant or complacent" and that they knew that record sales could increase if they did appear. They thought providing them with the music video for "Gold" to air on the broadcast would make up for their absence, but the show's producers decided not to run it, leaving Hadley convinced that in not doing so they prevented Spandau Ballet from having another number one single.

"Gold" also made the top 10 on the pop charts in Australia, Belgium, Ireland, the Netherlands, New Zealand and Spain. It spent 12 weeks on the US Billboard Hot 100, debuting at number 68 the week of 19 November 1983 and peaking at number 29 the weeks of 14 and 21 January 1984. It made its first appearance on the magazine's Adult Contemporary chart in that same issue and peaked at number 17 over the course of 11 weeks. The song is their second-highest charting single in both the UK and the US, behind their previous release, "True". It received Gold certification from the British Phonographic Industry on 19 April 2019 for reaching the 400,000 units of shipment threshold and Platinum certification for 600,000 units on 27 August 2021.

== Critical reception ==
Spandau Ballet - "Gold"
While some critics described "Gold" as "tasteful" and "smashing", others called it "kitschy" and "laughable".

A couple of critics picked up on the Bond tribute, but reviews were divided. Billboard magazine explained, "High drama, artful and elegant" was the success behind "True" and that "Gold" was "a little more energetic if equally tasteful. Breathing a world of meaning into a one-word hook is proving to be one of vocalist Tony Hadley's greatest gifts." Cashbox also compared the two songs, stating that the new single had "an energetic thrust" and mentioning, "A pretty sax solo also highlights." Mike Gardner of Record Mirror was especially enthusiastic about the song in his weekly review column: "In a week when most have forgotten about simple things like melodies, beats, style, feeling and simple entertainment, along comes Gary Kemp and the lads to show how it can be done." Number One’s Sunie Fletcher thought that Kemp had "written the best Bond film song for donkey's years. It's big, bold and dramatic, with big Tone Basseying away like a good 'un. Smashing."

Although Peter Martin of Smash Hits wrote, "Consolidating Gary Kemp's chances of soundtracking James Bond films, 'Gold' is elaborately classy and eminently tasteful", he also warned, "Make no mistake. This is not a number one. Bereft of the magic of 'True', this works hard to be special, and it shows." Gavin Martin of New Musical Express took issue with the lines "These are my salad days,/Slowly being eaten away", claiming, "the words are just laughable but delivered in a way that makes you think everyone but Tony Hadley has been let in on the joke." In reviewing the band's 2014 Royal Albert Hall concert, Ian Gittins described the song in The Guardian as a "brash blare of self-belief that appears to be constructed from pure titanium. It may be the least subtle song ever written, but, like Spandau Ballet, it mainlines sheer chutzpah." In a retrospective review, Stewart Mason of AllMusic thought it was "weaker" than the other singles from the True album, specifying that while "Lifeline" and the title song "sound utterly natural and convincing, there's something just vaguely off about 'Gold'". He accused Kemp of wanting to write a hit that sounds like "late-period Roxy Music" and dismissed it as "entertaining in its own kitschy way".

== Legacy ==
"Gold" became associated with the top prize at the Olympic Games. The band performed the song there in the summer of 1988 and, as part of the UK radio station Absolute Radio's celebrations for the 2012 Summer Olympics, Christian O'Connell, the network's breakfast show host, pledged to play the song for every gold medal won by Team GB. Hadley was also invited onto the programme for a live performance of the song. DJ Paul Oakenfold, a close friend of the band, created a special 12-inch remix of "Gold" for the 2012 Olympics.

In explaining his earnings being higher since the start of the 21st century than they had been in the 1980s, Hadley said, "'Gold' is the song which even today's kids enjoy singing along to in student bars up and down the country, and is one of main reasons I get so many corporate shows. It's requested all the time at awards shows."

== Aftermath ==
Kemp was disappointed with the number 29 showing of the song on the US pop chart and took it as a sign that Chrysalis America was not working to promote them. The US release of "Communication" that followed in 1984 only got as high as number 59, and "Only When You Leave", the first single from their next album, Parade, became their last Hot 100 entry when it peaked at number 34 later that year. Kemp was unhappy with their performances stateside as well and blamed the low numbers on his perception that a conflict between Chrysalis founders Chris Wright and Terry Ellis was taking up time that could benefit Spandau Ballet. Wright refused to license the band to a bigger label in the U.S., so they sought legal advice to get out of their contract. The disappointing singles chart entries in the U.S. resulted in their move from Chrysalis to CBS Records, which released their Parade follow-up, Through the Barricades, in 1986.

Kemp felt a strong attraction to Frost during her audition for the "Gold" music video. When they parted ways after the shoot, she asked him to call her, but their next contact was in 1986 when she was hired to appear in the Spandau Ballet video "Fight for Ourselves". They married in 1988 and were divorced in 1995.

A semi-acoustic version of "Gold" was recorded for Spandau Ballet's 2009 album Once More, and in 2012 Belgian record producer, musician and DJ Basto used Hadley's original vocal recording for a remix titled "Gold 2012" that was credited as Spandau Ballet vs. Basto. In Billboard magazine, it peaked at number eight on the Dance Club Songs, number 20 on the Dance/Electronic Songs, and number 34 on the Global Dance Songs charts in 2013.

== Formats and track listings ==
=== Original recording ===
- UK 7-inch single
1. "Gold" – 3:54
2. "Gold" (Instrumental) – 2:40
- US 7-inch single
1. "Gold" – 3:54
2. "Gold" (Live) – 5:04

- UK 12-inch single
1. "Gold" (Extended Version) – 7:12
2. "Foundation" (Live) – 3:54
- US 12-inch single
1. "Gold" (Extended Version) – 7:12
2. "Gold" (Instrumental) – 2:40

=== Gold 2012 ===
- UK CD single
1. "Gold 2012" (Basto Radio Edit) – 3:08
2. "Gold 2012" (Basto Extended Mix) – 5:28
- US CD single
1. "Gold 2012" (Basto Extended Vocal) – 5:29
2. "Gold 2012" (Basto Club Mix) – 5:42
3. "Gold 2012" (Basto Radio Edit) – 3:08

== Personnel ==
Credits adapted from the liner notes for True, except as noted:

Spandau Ballet

- Tony Hadley – lead vocals
- Gary Kemp – guitar and backing vocals
- Martin Kemp – bass
- Steve Norman – saxophone and percussion
- John Keeble – drums

Additional musician

- Jess Bailey – keyboards

Production

- Tony Swain – producer, engineer
- Steve Jolley – producer
- Spandau Ballet – producers
- Richard Lengyel – engineering assistance
- Tim Young – mastering
- David Band – art direction, illustration
- Stephen Horsfall – typography
- Mixed at Red Bus Studios (London)
- Mastered at CBS Studios (London)
- "Foundation" recorded live at Sadler's Wells Theatre on 1 May 1983

== Charts ==
=== Weekly charts ===
Weekly chart performance for "Gold"
Chart (1983–1984)	Peak position
Australia (Kent Music Report)	9
Belgium (Ultratop 50 Flanders)	3
Canada Top Singles (RPM)	12
Canada Adult Contemporary (RPM)	27
Ireland (IRMA)	4
Luxembourg (Radio Luxembourg)	1
Netherlands (Dutch Top 40)	2
Netherlands (Single Top 100)	3
New Zealand (Recorded Music NZ)	8
Peru (UPI)	6
Quebec (ADISQ)	4
Spain (AFYVE)	4
UK Singles (Official Charts)	2
US Billboard Hot 100	29
US Adult Contemporary (Billboard)	17
US Cash Box Top 100 Singles	29
Venezuela (UPI)	8
West Germany (GfK)	16

Weekly chart performance for "Gold 2012"
Chart (2013)	Peak position
Global Dance Songs (Billboard)	34
US Dance Club Songs (Billboard)	8
US Hot Dance/Electronic Songs (Billboard)	20

=== Year-end charts ===
Year-end chart performance for "Gold"
Chart (1983)	Position
Australia (Kent Music Report)	74
Belgium (Ultratop 50 Flanders)	37
Netherlands (Dutch Top 40)	27
Netherlands (Single Top 100)	29
UK Singles (Gallup)	44

== Certifications ==
Certifications for "Gold"
Region	Certification	Certified units/sales
Italy (FIMI)	Gold	50,000^{‡}
New Zealand (RMNZ)	Gold	15,000^{‡}
United Kingdom (BPI)	Platinum	600,000^{‡}
^{‡} Sales+streaming figures based on certification alone.

== Bibliography ==
- Hadley, Tony (2004). To Cut a Long Story Short. London: Sidgwick & Jackson. ISBN 978-0-283-07386-1.
- Kemp, Gary (2009). I Know This Much: From Soho to Spandau. London: Fourth Estate. ISBN 978-0-00-732330-2.
