= Once More (Spandau Ballet album) =

Studio album by Spandau Ballet
- Released: 19 October 2009
- Recorded: 2009
- Genre: Pop
- Length: 55:11
- Label: Mercury
- Producer: Danton Supple

Spandau Ballet chronology
Singles, Rarities & Remixes (2000)	Once More (2009)	Gold: The Best of Spandau Ballet (2014)

Singles from Once More
- 1. "Once More" Released: 5 October 2009

Once More is the seventh and final studio album by the English new wave band Spandau Ballet, released on 19 October 2009 by Mercury Records. The album includes 11 re-recordings from the band's back catalogue and two newly written songs. The first single, the title track "Once More", one of the two brand-new songs, was released as a promotional single on 5 October 2009 and as a digital download on the same day as the album was released. The album entered at number seven on the UK Album Chart on 25 October 2009, becoming their seventh UK Top 10 album.

== Background ==
As Spandau Ballet was working on their 1989 album Heart Like a Sky, lead guitarist and songwriter Gary Kemp decided he wanted a production credit on the album that was separate from the rest of the band. In his autobiography I Know This Much: From Soho to Spandau, he wrote, "I knew this would be our final album and I didn't care what the others thought." Heart Like a Sky and its four singles performed poorly in the UK. The band then recorded a cover of Simon and Garfunkel's "The Boxer" in order to receive a payment from their record company, (Note: "The last time we'd been in a studio together had been just after coming off of the Heart Like a Sky tour, and was a gruelling experience that we'd all chosen to forget. I'd been in no mood to write another Spandau album and Dagger knew it … Dagger was rightly worried that we'd not do another album together ever again, and, hoping for the best but planning for the worst, he called to tell me that if we went into the studio we'd trigger a payment from CBS for the advance on the next album. I suggested we find a song to cover rather than face each other in a musical confrontation of personal interests.") but Kemp described his feelings about the fate of Spandau Ballet after recording the song as "an unspoken acceptance that the band would not be working, at least for the foreseeable future."

Another Spandau Ballet album seemed even less likely after the other members of the band learned that Kemp decided to discontinue the distribution of publishing royalties to them. A judge ruled in favor of his decision in 1999 when bandmates Tony Hadley, John Keeble and Steve Norman filed a lawsuit over the issue.

By the late 2000s, Kemp was wanting to get back together with the disgruntled bandmates and eventually convinced them to do so. The reunited Spandau Ballet scheduled a tour that began in October 2009 with eight stops in the UK and Ireland. The London show sold out in 20 minutes, so a second was added. According to Hadley, the positive response to the tour was so encouraging that they were compelled to work on a new album as soon as possible. (Note: "When we got back together and the tour dates went on sale, none of us could believe the fantastic reaction we got from fans and the press alike. When the opportunity came to get into a studio and play music together, we couldn't pass it up.") They chose to record acoustic versions of their chart hits, which Norman found to be beneficial in that "it kind of eased us into the studio process together. If we'd all gone into the studio and tried to have written songs together, it might have been a bit too much to handle at the time." Kemp described the approach they took:

I was a bit worried, because I didn't want it to be softer versions of what we're going to do [on tour], so we decided to make it darker and more menacing; "To Cut a Long Story Short" is dark and brooding, and "Chant No. 1" has ended up a swamp track from the southern states of America.

Norman concurred that the new recordings took the songs to a "very dark, different place". Kemp always had sole credit for the previous material he had written for the band, but he shared the songwriting credit with Norman on the title track. Kemp said, "The new song was a way for us to show that Spandau Ballet are back, not just to play the hits on tour but also to take on our contemporaries in the pop charts!"

The album was produced by Danton Supple, who co-produced Coldplay's X&Y album.

== Release and commercial performance ==
Once More was released on 19 October 2009. It peaked at number 7 during its first of 5 weeks on the UK Albums Chart. It also reached number 9 in Scotland, number 17 in Italy, number 30 in Germany, number 34 in Spain and number 46 in the Netherlands.

== Critical reception ==
Professional ratings
Review scores
Source	Rating
AllMusic	4/5 stars

The album received mixed reviews upon its release. While AllMusic's Stephen Schnee did not care for their new version of "Chant No. 1", he wrote, "The rest, though, are delicious new looks at songs that served as a soundtrack to a generation." Paul Lester of the BBC, however, found fault with several of the updates, complaining that the acoustic treatment was applied to "To Cut a Long Story Short" "to near comical effect", that "Chant No. 1" was "reduced to supper club vamp", that "True" was "far less lavish than the original and thus less compelling", and that "She Loved Like Diamond" was turned into a "generic MOR ballad".

== Single ==
The title track was released as a single in October 2009 and spent its one week on the UK Singles Chart at number 82. The album reviewers commented on it alongside the other original song, "Love Is All". Schnee wrote, "Both tracks are wonderful ballads that may not be as drop-dead gorgeous as 'True', but they are right up there with other favorites like 'How Many Lies'." Lester was not as impressed by either of the new songs, writing, "[T]hey are, in this context, and given the consistently bland treatment, virtually indistinguishable from their 80s hits."

== Aftermath ==
On 31 July 2014 the band announced on their website that they were "working on new material with Trevor Horn," with whom they had last worked on the 1984 charity song "Do They Know It's Christmas?" Horn also remixed Spandau Ballet's Diamond track "Instinction" in 1982. On 18 August 2014 a post on their website explained that the new material consisted of three tracks to be released in October on a compilation titled The Story: The Very Best of Spandau Ballet.

== Track listing ==
All tracks are written by Gary Kemp, except "Once More" by Kemp and Steve Norman, and "Love Is All" by Tony Hadley.

No.	Title	Length
1.	"Once More"	4:06
2.	"To Cut a Long Story Short"	3:50
3.	"Gold"	4:17
4.	"True"	5:45
5.	"Chant No. 1"	3:33
6.	"I'll Fly for You"	5:22
7.	"Only When You Leave"	5:08
8.	"Through the Barricades"	4:47
9.	"She Loved Like Diamond"	3:24
10.	"Communication"	3:15
11.	"Lifeline"	4:06
12.	"With the Pride"	3:25
13.	"Love Is All"	4:05

== Charts ==
Chart performance for Once More
Chart (2009)	Peak position
Dutch Albums (Album Top 100)	46
German Albums (Offizielle Top 100)	30
Italian Albums (FIMI)	17
Scottish Albums (OCC)	9
Spanish Albums (Promusicae)	34
UK Albums (OCC)	7

== Certifications ==
Certifications for Once More
Region	Certification	Certified units/sales
Italy (FIMI)	Gold	25,000^{*}
United Kingdom (BPI)	Gold	100,000^{‡}
^{*} Sales figures based on certification alone.^{‡} Sales+streaming figures based on certification alone.

== Bibliography ==
- Kemp, Gary (2009). I Know This Much: From Soho to Spandau. London: Fourth Estate. ISBN 978-0-00-732330-2.
