= True (Spandau Ballet album) =

Studio album by Spandau Ballet
- Released: 4 March 1983
- Recorded: August, October–December 1982
- Studios: Red Bus (London); Compass Point (Nassau)
- Genres: Blue-eyed soul, pop
- Length: 35:36
- Label: Chrysalis
- Producers: Tony Swain; Steve Jolley; Spandau Ballet

Spandau Ballet chronology
Diamond (1982)	True (1983)	Parade (1984)

Singles from True
- 1. "Lifeline" Released: 24 September 1982; 2. "Communication" Released: 4 February 1983; 3. "True" Released: 15 April 1983; 4. "Gold" Released: 5 August 1983; 5. "Pleasure" Released: November 1983

True is the third studio album by the English new wave band Spandau Ballet, released on 4 March 1983 by Chrysalis Records. The band's songwriter/guitarist Gary Kemp realised after the release of their second album that the nightclub audience they initially wanted to attract had lost interest in them in part because of the band's transition from dance music to pop. He no longer felt obligated to keep writing music for them and shifted his focus to soul and R&B influences such as Marvin Gaye and Al Green for this album. Kemp thought that bandmate Steve Norman's newfound interest in the saxophone would be well-suited to the sound he was going for, as would the decision to record most of the album at Compass Point Studios in the Bahamas.

After an unsuccessful attempt to begin work on the album with producer Trevor Horn, the band tested out their working relationship with Tony Swain and Steve Jolley while recording its first single, "Lifeline", and chose to produce the album alongside them. "Lifeline" was a top ten hit on the UK Singles Chart, and its follow-up, "Communication", also did well. The album became available as the second single climbed the charts, and the overwhelming response to the title track dictated its release as the third single from the album, leading it to four weeks as the most popular song in the UK. It also became their first song to appear on the Billboard Hot 100 in the US, where it peaked at number four. A fourth single, "Gold", reached number two in the UK but only got as high as 29 in the US, which Kemp attributed to internal conflicts at their record label that took time away from promoting the band.

On the album charts, True reached number one in the UK and number 19 in the US while also having success in numerous other countries. It achieved platinum certification for sales of 300,000 units in the UK less than three months after its release. Most critics thought the album was enjoyable, but there were those who found something or much to dislike. The choice of suits for the album photos and "True" music video was thought to have misled US audiences by presenting them as too clean cut to have much else to offer other than soul ballads like the title song.

== Background, development and recording ==
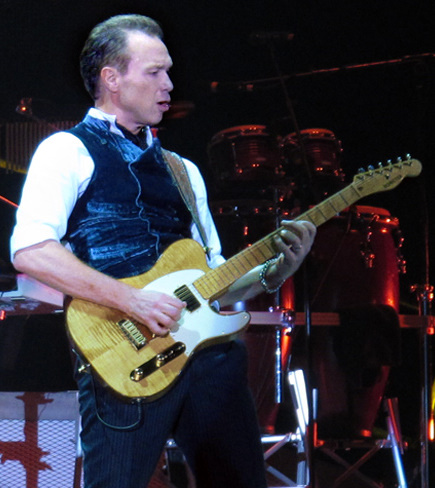
Gary Kemp wrote the songs for the album.

When Spandau Ballet first formed, their guitarist/songwriter Gary Kemp had been aware of how previous generations of Britain's youth culture had bands representing them, such as the Mods having the Who and the Small Faces. He wanted people to associate Spandau with the fashion-wise clientele of a popular Tuesday night London gathering called the Blitz, (Note: "Every seminal moment in British youth culture had had a band or artist that represented it: skiffle – Lonnie Donegan … punk – the Sex Pistols. We knew, even then, that Blitz and all it entailed and encouraged was going to be an important chapter in the story of London youth and their street-found fashions; and so, in a basement studio on Islington's Holloway Road, the Angel boys were busily trying to create a band who'd embody this latest twist in the tale.") and had written songs that sounded like what was played there, (Note: " … our future sound had to be like the one we heard every Tuesday night. If we were to attempt to be the band that represented this new cult, then we had to be absolutely ready.") what he described as "white European dance music".

Their first album, Journeys to Glory, was a successful culmination of this style of material that Kemp had written at his own pace and that had been tested in front of the Blitz crowd over an extended period of time, but coming up with songs for their second effort, Diamond, was more challenging. (Note: "Unlike second marriages, second albums are notoriously difficult. Journeys had been developed over some time and played live before we went into the recording studio, with some songs being discarded at the last minute. It was a mission statement, cohesive and tight, with none of the indulgence that often plagues follow-ups.") Although following a renewed interest in funk gave them a number 3 UK hit with its first single, "Chant No. 1 (I Don't Need This Pressure On)", the writer's block Kemp suffered as it climbed the UK Singles Chart resulted in his mimicking its use of horns and group vocals for the next single, "Paint Me Down", which had a number 30 showing in the UK, the lowest peak position there of any of their singles to date. An experiment with the eastern European sound from American film scores for the third single, "She Loved Like Diamond", fared even worse just as Diamond was about to be released; that inspired the idea to take another song from the album, "Instinction", and hire a new producer to remix it in the hope that it would perform better. Kemp described that track as being the closest thing to a pop song that Spandau Ballet had yet recorded. (Note: "'Look, Diamond has just come out; it can't survive without another single from it.' … 'I'm worried it won’t be enough just to release "Instinction". We need something else. A remix maybe.' Remix was a business euphemism for SOS. But Dagger was right – the song had more pop in it than anything we'd ever done …") The band hired Buggles founder Trevor Horn to do the new arrangement of the song, which reached number ten in the UK and made Kemp realise that the clubgoers they had initially catered to were no longer interested in their music. He was now able to write songs without concern for their danceability or adherence to current tastes. (Note: "At the end of the second album there was a feeling, you know, there were some of the kids we were hanging out with at the time who were going, 'We can't follow these guys anymore. They've been on Top of the Pops six times.' It's not really cult, is it? And I sort of realized that I didn't have to keep chasing 'What's the latest rhythm that I need to write to? What sound are all my friends wanting to dance to in that club?' I could just actually breathe and write a song, and it would not be written from the beat upwards or the riff.") In his autobiography I Know This Much: From Soho to Spandau, he explained, "The freedom of not having to write just for Soho meant I could dive into that great big reservoir of pop, deep with melody and soul, and hopefully surface with the pearls I wanted."

Because of the rebound the band experienced with Horn's reworking of "Instinction", the plan was to have him produce the next album. He was especially impressed with one of Kemp's recent compositions, "Pleasure", and wanted to start working with the band on it immediately. The rehearsal went well, and they began recording it at AIR Studios with the mindset that it would be the first single from the new album, which was initially called The Pleasure Project. On the first day of recording, however, Horn had drummer John Keeble redo the track repeatedly over the course of the ten-hour day to try to get it perfect and called Kemp that evening to offer to programme the drums and suggest that they get a new drummer. Kemp was stunned by the suggestion: "I heard myself saying that programming the drums would not just be psychologically wrong for our team spirit, but it would also undermine John as a player." He refused Horn, who decided not to continue working with them. Later in 1982 Kemp told Smash Hits magazine, "We couldn't have worked with Trevor because he was too overpowering, too dogmatic."

The band's manager, Steve Dagger, suggested producers Tony Swain and Steve Jolley, who recently had success with Bananarama, and Kemp performed some of the songs he had just written for the duo with the plan of having them produce the first single from the new album to see if they had a good working relationship with the band. While Swain was leaning toward "Communication" as the best choice for their next hit song, Jolley insisted that they work on the "up-tempo, more obvious pop sing-along" "Lifeline". The band was credited alongside Jolley and Swain as producers of "Lifeline" and would be on the album as well.

"Lifeline" was recorded at Red Bus Studios in Paddington as Spandau Ballet got a feel for their new producers, but they worked on the rest of the album at Compass Point Studios in the Bahamas because of the soul music that had been recorded there and because Kemp felt that the tropical surroundings would help give the music the feeling he was trying to achieve. The band rehearsed before they travelled there, and lead singer Tony Hadley recorded his vocals at Red Bus upon their return.

== Songs ==
In a Mastertapes interview with John Wilson in 2013, Kemp contrasted the anti-establishment, anticommercial stance of the punk scene with the plan that Spandau Ballet initially had of having similar attitudes in their dress and style of music but selling enough records to make the pop charts at the same time. (Note: "In a way, what we were doing—'cause punk was so anti-establishment and so anti-being commercial, we were trying to be subversive by saying, 'We want to be commercial. We want to sell lots of records. We'll sell them on our terms, and we'll look like this and we'll play this kind of music. But it's about getting in the charts for us.'") He felt that their appearances on the British music chart television programme Top of the Pops contributed to their assimilation into a more mainstream sound (Note: "I remember thinking that we no longer wanted to be a cult band. We'd always been about what was hip, but it's impossible to keep that going when you've been on Top of the Pops six times.") and explained that, because of his realisation that their music no longer interested the nightclub crowd after the release of "Instinction", "There was a sense of, 'We have to move on from here.'" He told Wilson how their desire to expand to a broader audience inspired the "True" lyric "I bought a ticket to the world". (Note: " … and we wanted-- I wrote it in the lyric. 'I bought a ticket to the world', and that's what we wanted to do.") In 2012 he told The Guardian, "We were leaving the London club scene and starting to sell records around the world, so the next album really needed to be pop."

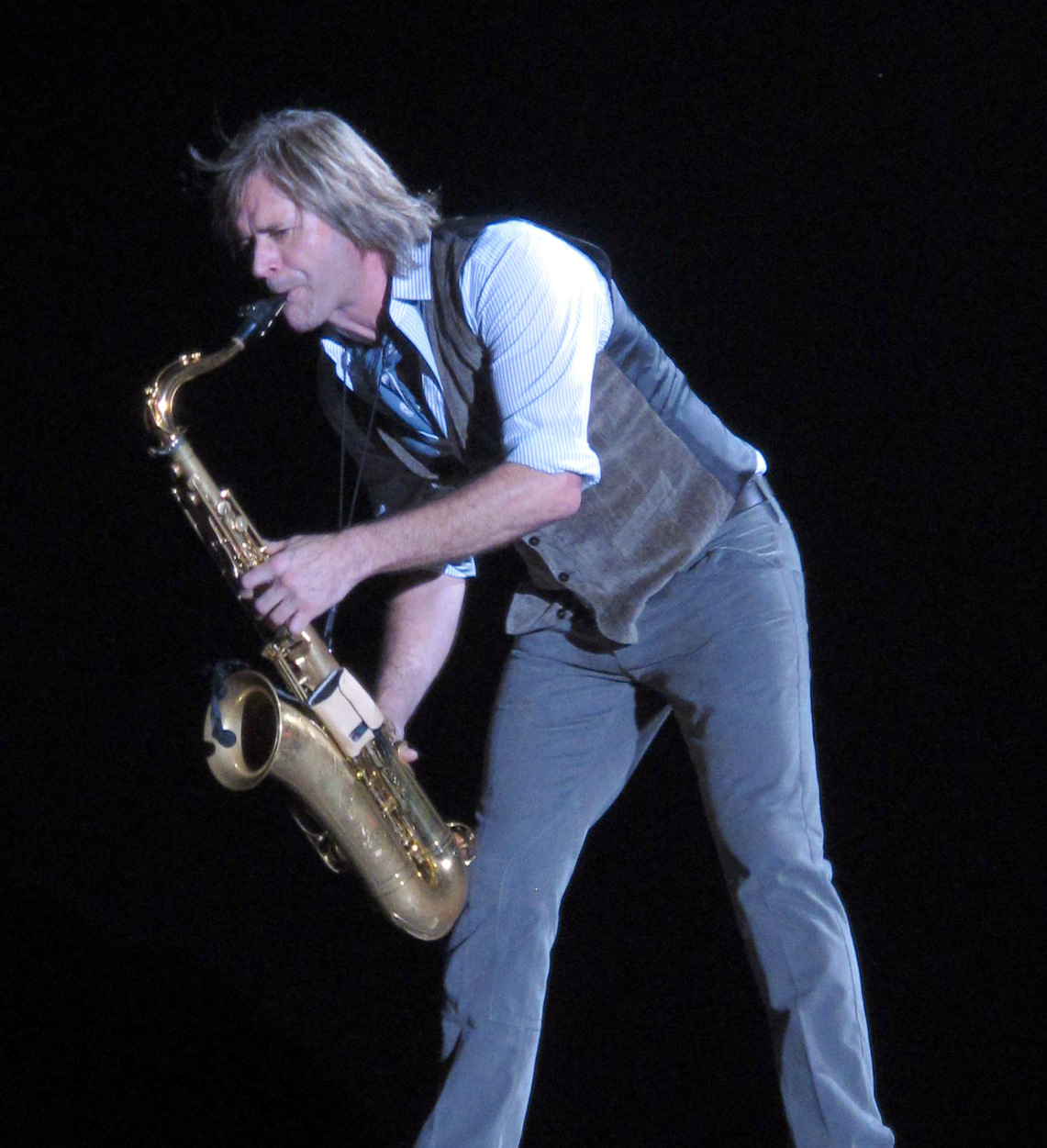
Gary Kemp wanted Steve Norman's saxophone to become "the sound" of the True album.

In 1981 the band recorded "Chant No. 1" with the British jazz-funk group Beggar and Co acting as their horn section, and Steve Norman, who had been the band's guitarist and percussionist on its first two albums, subsequently felt inspired to take up the saxophone. (Note: " … the sax, an inspiration from the Beggar & Co. sessions, fell easily into his hands.") Kemp recalled he and Norman enjoying hearing the instrument as teenagers on songs by Smokey Robinson and Stevie Wonder as well as the hit "Shame" by Evelyn "Champagne" King. (Note: "As teenagers we'd listen endlessly to the blowing on Smokey and Stevie's hits, as well as, more recently, Evelyn Champagne King's sublime 'Shame' — with its silky sax breaks it had been on constant rotation for us since our cruising around Bournemouth during Easter weekend 1978.") Kemp decided that their foray into pop on the new album would use the saxophone in the same vein as the soul music they enjoyed growing up. Once he found this new direction for their music, he suddenly had the urge to write several songs. (Note: "And so the sound of the sax felt very much like home and we loved the sweet, nostalgic voice it gave us. It was the sound of soul; it would be the sound of the new album. And the songs had started to arrive quickly: 'Communication'; 'Code Of Love'; 'Heaven Is A Secret'; 'Lifeline'.") In an early 1983 interview with Record Mirror magazine, he confessed feeling that the songs for this album were the best that he had ever written and explained that he went back to writing what sounded good with just an acoustic guitar. He discussed the difficulty of trying to focus on more personal subjects without sounding derivative and how he had overcome his fear of being honest in his music. (Note: "It's a much more song-orientated album, going back to the way I used to write, songs that sounded really good with just me and an acoustic guitar. I think they're the best things I've ever written, easily. The songs are more personal as well for me. Writing songs about relationships is hard. I used to think it was easy. Let's write songs about people in rooms in the East. But nobody can relate to that. The hard thing is doing it in an original way AND being personal … When you get into the music business you tend to get scared of being honest in your music, but this time I didn't care at all.") He said, "I honestly wanted to make an album that would cross all ages and become timeless. I said to Tony Swain, 'I like Daryl Hall and John Oates, and I want the album to sound as smooth as that but with a British edge to it.' I think it's got that."

=== "True" ===
In 1981, Kemp met Altered Images lead singer Clare Grogan and, despite already having a girlfriend, found himself infatuated with her because of their common interests. By the time he started writing songs for the album, he was primarily listening to music by Marvin Gaye and Al Green and wanted to write a blue-eyed soul version of their style of music (Note: "I think I wanted to write a song that was a bit like a Marvin Gaye, Al Green song, a blue-eyed soul song.") that was based on his own experience. (Note: "You're sitting at home, and there's the music in your head, and I say, That's the song I want to write. So then you use it as a springboard to go into your truth, you know.") Grogan had given him a copy of the novel Lolita by Vladimir Nabokov as a gift, so he incorporated a couple of phrases he had underlined while reading it into the lyrics – "pill on my tongue" and "seaside limbs", which became "seaside arms" – in order to convey his feelings in a way that she would recognise. He told Wilson he was still getting questioned about the meaning of "seaside arms" or criticised for his paraphrasing of the expression. (Note: "We all look for influences in our life, and I had a slightly unrequited passion for a particular lovely woman—girl … And I actually got a little gift from this girl, and it was the book Lolita by Nabokov. And there was some lyrics that I twisted in there. I mean, people are always saying, 'What are you talking about? Seaside arms? What's that about? Really! What a naff lyric!'") (Note: "I was ridiculed for that for years. 'What's that line about? It's stupid.'")

=== "Gold" ===
Once Kemp decided to start writing pop songs, the first idea he chose to explore was paying homage to film scores as he had attempted on "She Loved Like Diamond", only this time focusing specifically on John Barry and his work on the James Bond series. The title of the song, "Gold", was inspired by Shirley Bassey's 1964 hit Bond theme "Goldfinger". (Note: "I wanted to do a James Bond theme song. That's what was in my head. I loved John Barry. I loved the chords, the sort of … eastern European chords. And Gold was obviously from "Goldfinger", I guess, you know … It was about trying to make a movie theme.") Because he and his brother, Martin, who was the bassist for the band, were still living with their parents as he began writing songs for the album, it was convenient to have his brother listen to what he had just written and play it with him on his bass to see if it sounded like what he intended, and this song was one Martin loved. (Note: "I'd work on an idea and then call Martin in to play it to him. It was my young-brother whistle-test. He'd trot down from watching telly and then cringe, nod or "wow" accordingly. He'd play along with his bass and I'd get a sense if I was going in the right direction or not. 'Gold' he loved, and more came quickly.")

== Cover art ==
Kemp was competing for Grogan's attention with Altered Images cover artist David Band and asked him to work with Spandau Ballet on the design for the new album. Because they were both seeing their careers take off during their attempts to court Grogan, they went camping together a few times in the English Lake District as a way of escaping their success. (Note: "We liked hiking. So our passion was to go to the mountains. I went to the Lake District with him a few times and we camped up there together. We were living through this great heightened period in the eighties of celebrity and success and yet David and I would like to bury ourselves away and become two small creatures climbing in the mountains, and I think that was very bonding.") Kemp recalled, "We first started to devise a cover together for the True album when we were up in the mountains, in one of the pubs one evening. He was drawing in his sketchbook and a dove appeared, this little dove." Band later added alongside it the outline of a man's head with a brimmed hat, which the band loved; a variation was used for the sleeve of the "True" single. His work was described as "a marker for the look of the time, a jazz-influenced style that could also be seen in an exaggerated fashion in the New Romantic look." Kemp credits him with having "the skill of coming up with simple, figurative graphics that would set a visual tone for the decade." In 2012 he told The Herald:

I felt David was tuning into something visually and graphically that was in the air anyway. But he was the first to do that. David set the tone for a certain look. A lot of people picked up on it. He was creating something new that was inspiring everyone.

== Release and commercial performance ==
True was released on 4 March 1983 and received silver certification from the British Phonographic Industry on 9 March for reaching the 60,000 units of shipment threshold. It entered the UK Albums Chart on 12 March to begin a chart run of 90 weeks, one of which was at number 1. Gold certification for reaching 100,000 units was issued on 11 April, and platinum (300,000 units) came the following month on 23 May. It also reached the top spot in the Netherlands and New Zealand and performed well in other countries. (Note: The album peaked at number 4 in Australia, number 8 in Canada and West Germany and number 13 in Sweden.) In the US, the album debuted on Billboard magazine's Top LPs & Tapes chart in the issue dated 14 May 1983 and peaked at number 19 during a 37-week run.

To commemorate its 20th anniversary, a remastered version of "True" was released on 29 April 2003 as a single CD with the original eight tracks along with the music video for "Gold" and some home video footage of the band. The original 8-track album was also issued in 2003 on the high-resolution super audio CD format as a Hybrid SACD (in stereo only). In 2008, the album was given away free with copies of the Daily Mail newspaper. (Note: "In September 2008 the Daily Mail came up with the ultimate promotion. On twelve consecutive days they gave away an original 80s album. It started off with Spandau Ballet's True …") In June 2010, a special edition was released on 2 CDs with a DVD as part of the 2010 Spandau Ballet reissues series, featuring remastered 12″ remixes and B-sides, plus a live concert.

== Critical reception ==
Professional ratings
Review scores
Source	Rating
AllMusic	3.5/5 stars
Record Mirror	4/5 stars
The Rolling Stone Album Guide	3/5 stars
Smash Hits	7 1/2/10

Billboard magazine gave the album a positive review upon its release in the US, noting that "Pleasure" and "Code of Love" "linger with the fresh feel of new music while owing to swing era rhythms, even MOR." Most reviewers at the time, however, qualified their praise. Parke Puterbaugh of Rolling Stone magazine wrote, "You can shut your eyes while listening to True and almost imagine that Spandau Ballet has had nothing to do with clothes, makeup or any fashion-show pseudoevents" and concluded that the album was "a sleekly executed, surprisingly affecting record, and welcome proof that bunch of clotheshorses can place high in the musical stakes, too." Don Mackay of Rip It Up also summed up his comments with a reference to their vestiary history: "While still some distance short of profundity, the result is generally pleasant enough with tracks like 'Communication', 'Lifeline' and 'Foundation' at least proving that the Ballet really can dance. Perhaps there's life in the old clotheshorses yet." Trouser Press magazine's Ira Robbins also counted "Communication" and "Lifeline" as album highlights, adding, "The remaining six cuts aren't as noteworthy, but at least aren't objectionable or off-putting." Dave Rimmer of Smash Hits conceded that "there's nothing here as awful as, say, '[She Loved Like] Diamond', but on the other hand nothing as brilliant as 'Chant No. 1'. True is less interesting than previous Spandau LPs, but much more enjoyable." Record Mirror's Betty Page warned,

Enter into True with a mind truly free of preconceptions, and you'll wallow in a chunk of creamy, dreamy funk with satisfyingly rounded edges. Turn a cynical eye to who you're dealing with and where they've come from and you'll find plenty of cannon fodder.

Gavin Martin of the New Musical Express wrote a long, scathing review of the album, which he opened by describing the band as "slimy" and "ingratiating" with "opportunist, vaguely plagiaristic whims and indulgences". He called the album "milksop funk pap", "bland feckless goo" and "doleful emasculation". Regarding Kemp's songwriting, he wrote,

Despite all the talk of inner strength and celebrations of the highlife elsewhere, the music is stale and rigid with a backline that fairly grinds along where it should be bright and alert. As a pop band Spandau are too pedestrian, too tied up in their own self-important world to provide a sharp/indignant/imaginative insight to the times; and as a "soul" band, well, they're fooling no one.

Retrospective reviews were mixed. Paul Evans wrote a brief summary review of most of their album discography in The Rolling Stone Album Guide and gave True three stars out of five without much to recommend. At his most complimentary, he opined, "Tony Hadley developed a way of vocalizing that joined the heavy dramatics of Bryan Ferry to the lounge act 'feeling' of a Gary Puckett or a bad Bobby Darin." Of all their albums, he concluded, "True remains creepily fascinating." Dan LeRoy of AllMusic complimented "the growing skill of guitarist Gary Kemp, the band's primary songwriter, who crafted a set of tunes aimed squarely at the charts." Like Rimmer, however, he did not find anything as interesting as their previous UK hits:

Some listeners at the time called the album an MOR sellout, but its slick surfaces remain tough to resist, and while none of the cuts generate the excitement of past singles like "To Cut a Long Story Short" or "Chant No. 1," True remains Spandau Ballet's most consistent and best all-around album.

== Singles and videos ==
Swain and Jolley's selection for their tryout as producers, "Lifeline", became the first single released from the album and debuted on the UK Singles Chart dated 2 October 1982. It peaked at number 7 during its 9 weeks there and reached the pop charts in other countries. (Note: "Lifeline" peaked at number 68 in Australia, number 11 in Ireland, and number 33 in New Zealand.) In the US it "bubbled under" Billboard magazine's Hot 100 to number 108, and it was paired with "Communication" when it appeared on their Dance/Disco Top 80 chart. The US chart appearances coincided with the airing of the music video on MTV in the spring of 1983. Critics were divided, with some finding it bland and others appreciating the R&B-style vocals.

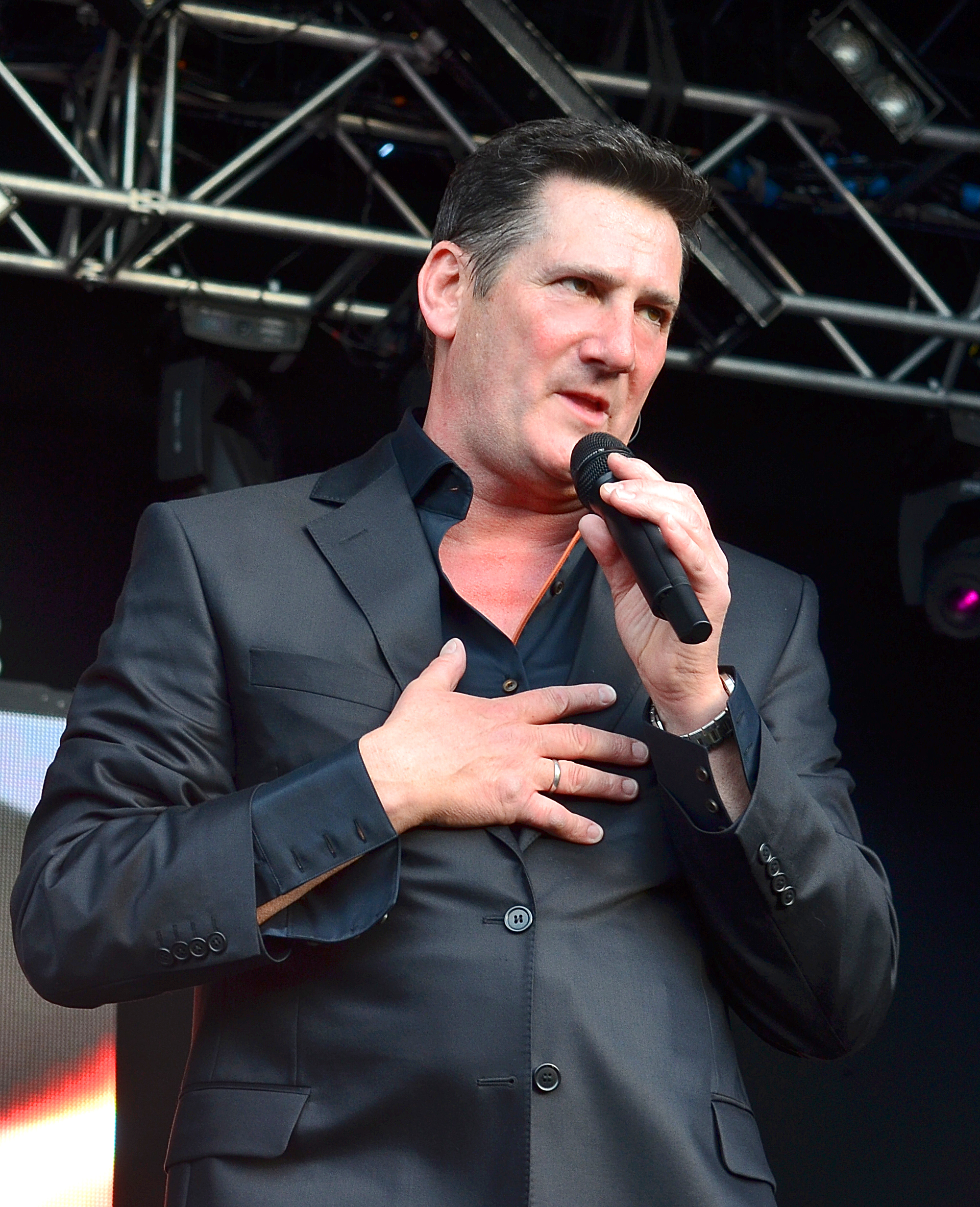
Lead singer Tony Hadley was prominently and sometimes exclusively featured in the album's music videos.

The album was completed in December 1982, but Kemp explained that when the next single needed to be chosen, the band's manager, Steve Dagger, "didn't want to go with a ballad next and recommended another up-tempo first. 'Communication' got the band vote. Why we didn't go straight for 'True' or 'Gold' as the next single, I'm not sure. Maybe we felt their success would be automatic and wanted to save them for later, during the album's release." "Communication" debuted on the UK Singles Chart on 12 February 1983 and reached number 12 over the course of 10 weeks. It also charted in other countries, (Note: "Communication" reached number 24 in Australia, number 13 in Ireland, number 10 in New Zealand, and number 19 in Sweden.) and, in addition to its dance chart pairing with "Lifeline" in the US in the spring of 1983, it made the Billboard Hot 100 in the spring of 1984, after "True" and "Gold", the third and fourth singles from the album, completed their chart runs there. Reviews were mostly good; some critics complimented Hadley's vocals and appreciated what they felt was a scaled-back approach, but others still found it overdone. The music video for the song was made to look like a theatrical film, and, in order to increase his visibility, Hadley was the only band member to appear in it.

The title song began 15 weeks on the UK Singles Chart in April 1983 and spent four weeks at number one. It also went to the top spot in Canada and Ireland and made the top ten in several other countries, (Note: "True" reached number 3 in Spain, number 4 in Australia, the Netherlands and New Zealand, number 5 in Switzerland and number 9 in Belgium and West Germany.) including the US, where it got as high as number four on the Hot 100 and spent a week at number one on Billboard's Adult Contemporary chart. It received a variety of responses from critics, with some finding it flawless and others disliking it. Hadley felt that their choice to wear suits for the music video had given their US audience a misleading first impression since "True" was very different from the hits they had elsewhere.

"Gold" was the fourth UK single from the album and spent nine weeks on the pop chart there, two of which were at number two. Although it made the top ten in several other countries, (Note: "Gold" reached number 2 in the Netherlands, number 3 in Belgium, number 4 in Ireland and Spain, number 8 in New Zealand and number 9 in Australia.) it only got as high as number 29 in the US. The music video alternated shots of the band performing the song with a storyline in which Hadley played a character who wandered the sun-baked streets and outskirts of Carmona, Spain, searching for pieces that made up a gold puzzle. Critics were again in disagreement as some showed appreciation, others contempt.

Chrysalis wanted to release "Heaven Is a Secret" as a fifth single in the UK; however the band refused this. In limited European release at the end of 1983, "Pleasure" reached number 27 in the Netherlands, number 32 in Belgium, and number 61 in West Germany. In reviews of the album, "Pleasure" elicited the same divided response as some of the previous singles. Page described it as "smoothly mournful", but Martin used the song's lyrics as an example of Kemp "attempting to present characters that are strong and noble with dignity and high moral purpose", concluding, "Even [Spandau Ballet's] leisure time becomes a virtual religious experience."

== Aftermath ==
The number 29 showing by "Gold" in the US was the first signal to Kemp that Chrysalis America was not promoting them. (Note: "America was not going to plan. 'Gold' had been a hit, although not as big as 'True' ... While we were selling large amounts in Europe and the rest of the world, Chrysalis America were not pulling their weight.") "Communication" only reached number 59 in the US in 1984, and "Only When You Leave", the first single from their next album, Parade, became their last Hot 100 entry when it peaked at number 34 later that year. Kemp was unhappy with those performances as well (Note: "'Communication' and 'Only When You Leave' had fallen away early.") and blamed the low numbers on a perceived conflict between Chrysalis founders Chris Wright and Terry Ellis distracting them from promotional efforts. (Note: "The spat between Wright and Ellis, the two company owners, was worsening and it seemed to us we were being affected like the children of a disintegrating marriage.") Wright refused to license the band to a bigger label in the US, so they sought legal advice to get out of their contract. The disappointing chart performance in the US led Spandau Ballet to leave Chrysalis for CBS Records, which released their Parade follow-up, Through the Barricades, in 1986.

The problem, I think, with America is that you didn't have the pre-history, if you like. You didn't have "To Cut a Long Story Short", "Chant No. 1", except on a kind of club, cult-y level … on the coasts. So in mainstream America the first thing they saw were five really smart-looking young guys who every mother loved ... they didn't get the gritty bit before, so [the success of 'True' there] was a blessing and it was a curse.

— Tony Hadley

Hadley felt that the band's inability to sustain the interest of the American public resulted from a few other factors working against them, primarily that their big US hit was very different to what they had already succeeded with elsewhere. (Note: "It wasn't typical of our music as a whole - if anything, it was atypical - and there was a danger it could pigeonhole us in the eyes of the American market as five blokes in suits singing a ballad.") Kemp had said in an interview before "Gold"'s US release that he hoped it would give Americans a more balanced view of Spandau Ballet. (Note: "I'm glad 'Gold' is going to do well over here; it's shaking off the enigma of (the song) 'True'. It's selling us as a band. The thing that worried us about America is people didn't know Spandau Ballet, they knew 'True'. 'True' is a much stronger song if they know where it's coming from.") Although some American concert attendees knew their old songs, he hoped their upcoming US tour would show the rest who came that "True" was not the sort of song they normally did. (Note: "Spandau Ballet's history is important so people know what the band are. Certain people in America do; we've noticed on tour the back catalog are quite well known by a lot of the audience. People who only know Spandau Ballet for the soft focus image on 'True' ... well, we wanted to come over and show ourselves with all our hard edges, transport our history over to America.")

In retrospect, however, Hadley felt they needed to spend several months touring the US so that more audiences could hear that back catalogue and not doing so also hurt their record sales there. (Note: "The fact was, we had proved ourselves capable of balancing a ballad like 'True' with electro-pop and funk, but we couldn't quite get the U.S. market to understand that. We needed to spend months touring, letting them hear the whole repertoire, but we never did. ") They played "True" at the 1985 Live Aid concert, but instead of using their brief time on stage to showcase one of their earlier hits, Dagger wanted them to play "Virgin" from their upcoming Through the Barricades album, which even Kemp admitted was not a good idea. Hadley felt Dagger was inexperienced, but whenever he suggested getting a manager with more knowledge about the business, the rest of the band balked. (Note: "A couple of times I suggested we bring in a more experienced manager. It wasn't about ditching Steve Dagger. I just thought it made sense to have someone working with us who knew more about the business than we did. We were all - Steve included - as inexperienced as each other, learning (or not) as we went along. It wouldn’t have hurt to have someone with more commercial know-how on our side. No one else saw it that way. They were wary of bringing in outsiders. ")

Kemp told Creem in 1984 that he would continue to write for the larger audience Spandau Ballet had acquired with "True" but it would not be making albums that sounded like the last just because it did well. (Note: "If I can, I'll be writing songs that appeal to that amount of people. Doesn't mean to say I'm going to stick to an equation now, 'cause we never have. The next album won't sound like True just because True sold so well.") But, just as he had developed writer's block in 1981 after "Chant No. 1" became their highest-charting single, having a UK number one put pressure on Kemp to churn out more chart-topping hits and left him feeling that the band would always judge his future output against "True". (Note: "With 'True' I'd created my own competition, setting a personal benchmark almost impossible to reach again. A hit song of that nature takes on a legend of its own: people's lives become personally involved in it; they fall in love and get married to it; and a hungry band wants more of it. That kind of iconic status needs time. But whatever I brought to the rehearsal table would only be judged by 'True'.") When the Through the Barricades album and its singles failed to chart in the US, Kemp chided himself for exploring so many genres and not simply trying to write more hit songs that were imitations of "True". (Note: "[Dagger] was haunted by the lack of interest shown by them towards the Barricades album, which was ironic, given America was the reason we'd joined them in the first place. 'It's my fault, Steve,' I told him one day. 'I keep changing our style. I should have just written "True" over and over again.'")

== Track listing ==
All tracks are written by Gary Kemp.

No.	Title	Length
1.	"Pleasure"	3:35
2.	"Communication"	3:40
3.	"Code of Love"	5:11
4.	"Gold"	4:51
5.	"Lifeline"	3:36
6.	"Heaven Is a Secret"	4:27
7.	"Foundation"	4:08
8.	"True"	6:30

True – 2003 edition (bonus tracks)
No.	Title	Length
9.	"Home Video Footage" (multimedia)
10.	"Gold" (music video)	3:52

True – 2010 edition (bonus disc)
No.	Title	Length
1.	"Lifeline" (7″ short dub)	3:37
2.	"Communication" (7″ edited club version)	2:44
3.	"Gold" (12″ version)	7:14
4.	"Lifeline" (12″ version)	5:26
5.	"Communication" (12″ version)	4:28
6.	"Lifeline" (12″ dub)	5:17
7.	"True" (2002 version)	6:42
8.	"Gold" (instrumental)	2:44
9.	"Lifeline" (acappella)	2:02
10.	"True" (instrumental)	5:36
11.	"Code of Love" (live at Sadler's Wells, 1 May 1983)	5:39
12.	"The Freeze" (live at Sadler's Wells, 1 May 1983)	2:16
13.	"Glow" (live at Sadler's Wells, 1 May 1983)	3:42
14.	"Heaven Is a Secret" (live at Sadler's Wells, 1 May 1983)	4:51

== Personnel ==
=== Spandau Ballet ===
- Tony Hadley – lead and backing vocals
- Gary Kemp – guitars, backing vocals
- Martin Kemp – bass
- John Keeble – drums
- Steve Norman – percussion, saxophone

=== Additional musician ===
- Jess Bailey – keyboards

=== Technical ===
- Spandau Ballet – production
- Steve Jolley – production
- Tony Swain – production, engineering
- Richard Lengyel – engineering assistance
- Tim Young – mastering
- David Band – art direction, illustration
- Lynn Goldsmith – photography
- Stephen Horsfall – typography
- Mixed at Red Bus Studios (London)
- Mastered at CBS Studios (London)

== Charts ==
=== Weekly charts ===
Weekly chart performance for True
Chart (1983)	Peak position
Australian Albums (Kent Music Report)	4
Canada Top Albums/CDs (RPM)	8
Dutch Albums (Album Top 100)	1
German Albums (Offizielle Top 100)	8
New Zealand Albums (RMNZ)	1
Swedish Albums (Sverigetopplistan)	13
UK Albums (Official Charts)	1
US Billboard 200	19

=== Year-end charts ===
1983 year-end chart performance for True
Chart (1983)	Position
Australian Albums (Kent Music Report)	10
Canada Top Albums/CDs (RPM)	46
Dutch Albums (Album Top 100)	6
German Albums (Offizielle Top 100)	21
New Zealand Albums (RMNZ)	3
UK Albums (Gallup)	6

1984 year-end chart performance for True
Chart (1984)	Position
Canada Top Albums/CDs (RPM)	80
Dutch Albums (Album Top 100)	46

== Certifications ==
Certifications for True
Region	Certification	Certified units/sales
Germany (BVMI)	Gold	250,000^{^}
Netherlands (NVPI)	Platinum	100,000^{^}
New Zealand (RMNZ)	Platinum	15,000^{^}
Spain (Promusicae)	Gold	50,000^{^}
Sweden (GLF)	Gold	50,000^{^}
United Kingdom (BPI)	Platinum	300,000^{^}
^{^} Shipments figures based on certification alone.

== Bibliography ==
- Hadley, Tony (2004). To Cut a Long Story Short. Sidgwick & Jackson. ISBN 978-0-283-07386-1.
- Kemp, Gary (2009). I Know This Much: From Soho to Spandau. London: Fourth Estate. ISBN 978-0-00-732330-2.
- Kent, David (1993). Australian Chart Book 1970–1992 (illustrated ed.). St Ives, N.S.W.: Australian Chart Book. ISBN 0-646-11917-6.
