= Once More (Spandau Ballet song) =

Single by Spandau Ballet

from the album Once More
- Released: October 2009
- Recorded: 2009
- Genre: Pop
- Length: 4:06
- Label: Mercury
- Songwriters: Gary Kemp; Steve Norman
- Producer: Danton Supple

Spandau Ballet singles chronology
"Crashed Into Love" (1990)	"Once More" (2009)	"This Is the Love" (2014)

"Once More" is a song by the English new wave band Spandau Ballet, released as the second single from their 2009 acoustic album of the same name. It reached number 82 on the UK Singles Chart and received mixed reviews.

== Background ==
Spandau Ballet reunited in 2009, ten years after a disagreement over publishing royalties resulted in a court case and twenty years after the release of their last and least successful album, Heart Like a Sky. A tour was planned to mark the occasion along with an album of acoustic re-recordings of their biggest hits. Regarding the reunion, their saxophonist Steve Norman said, "[W]e bonded more than we ever have before, and it was important we did that." He found covering their own material to be beneficial in that "it kind of eased us into the studio process together. If we'd all gone into the studio and tried to have written songs together, it might have been a bit too much to handle at the time." He also explained that the record company wanted a new song for the album and that "the intention was really to build a bridge between now and the future of Spandau Ballet."

== Composition ==
The record company wanted the new song to be a ballad. The band's lead guitarist and songwriter Gary Kemp decided to have it showcase the talents of lead singer Tony Hadley. He told John Wilson in a Mastertapes interview in 2013 that he wrote the song specifically with Hadley in mind, which was the first time he had needed to do so in two decades. He said,

[T]he inspiration of knowing I was now going to write a song for Tony, I just went straight back and wrote the music for 'Once More' straight away. That was enough inspiration to write what I think turned out to be a really good song.

I know when we play on stage now and we all sing the words "once more"… it touches my heart.

– Gary Kemp in 2009

He also wanted it to be something "epic" and "cinematic" that would convey emotions similar to what the band had just been through and described the song as "a love affair about people trying [to have a relationship] again."

== Music video ==
The band wanted the video to emphasize performing; the black-and-white clip takes place in a recording studio. Kemp said, "We didn't want it to be telling some drippy story as we walked across some landscape."

== Commercial performance ==
"Once More" spent its sole week on the UK Singles Chart on 31 October 2009 at number 82.

== Critical reception ==
When the band released the album Once More, the title song was mentioned by critics alongside the other new composition included, "Love Is All", and received mixed reviews. Stephen Schnee of AllMusic wrote, "Both tracks are wonderful ballads that may not be as drop-dead gorgeous as 'True', but they are right up there with other favorites like 'How Many Lies'." Paul Lester of the BBC was not as impressed by either of the new songs, writing, "[T]hey are, in this context, and given the consistently bland treatment, virtually indistinguishable from their 80s hits."

== Charts ==
Weekly chart performance for "Once More"
Chart (2009)	Peak position
UK Singles (OCC)	82
