= R.O.C. (band) =

R.O.C
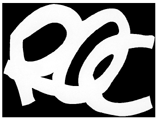

Background information
- Origin: Brixton, England
- Genres: Indie, electronic, new wave, dance
- Years active: 1990–present
- Labels: Virgin, Setanta, 12 Apostles, Spiky
- Members: Fred Browning; Karen Sheridan; Patrick Nicholson; Danton Supple
- Past members: Peter Burgess; Russell Warby; Mark Harris; Roddy Kennedy
- Website: www.rocmusic.com

R.O.C are a British electronic music group, founded in 1990 by Fred Browning and Patrick Nicholson in London, England. Karen Sheridan joined the band in 1993. R.O.C have released three albums (on the Virgin, Setanta and 12 Apostles labels) and 15 singles/EPs. Producer Danton Supple (Coldplay/Patti Smith) joined in 2017.

== Career ==
R.O.C began with Browning and Nicholson making demos on 4-track cassette, laying film dialogue over Drumatix beats and Casio keyboards.

By 1993, R.O.C was Browning, Nicholson, Karen Sheridan (from Denver, US), Russell Warby, and producer Peter Burgess. They released 5 singles/EPs on their Little Star label, quickly gaining critical acclaim and airplay from the likes of John Peel on UK Radio 1, and KCRW in LA. "Girl with a Crooked Eye" made 1994's John Peel Festive 50 and earned R.O.C a session on the DJ's Radio 1 show. Their releases revealed R.O.C's disregard for genres, throwing rock, dance, spoken-word and noise influences into their evolving songs. Airing their Radio 1 session, Peel said '"you never know what you're gonna get next from this lot, do you? I'm all in favour of that."

Of the single "God Willing", Dazed & Confused magazine said: "pseudo-religious spoken word over ambient pop, if it was the only record R.O.C ever released it would still put them in the top 50 best British bands."

The singles displayed a tendency to black humour. "Girl with a Crooked Eye" is a duet about domestic violence on holiday. But with their 1996 debut album, ROC, the group revealed a more personal side as Browning and Sheridan's vocals took centre stage. The group was now a trio of Browning, Nicholson and Sheridan. The album was widely acclaimed; Music Week called it "a storming debut album by this outfit who are impossible to categorise. The extraordinarily diverse set veers from electronic ambience to slick pop tunes. An early candidate for album of the year."

A single from the album, "Hey You Chick" was shot in the band's stamping ground of Brixton, South London, the camera relentlessly following a girl's bottom around the streets. The video opened an edition of BBC's Top of the Pops 2, and was voted Video of the Year in Melody Maker by prankster Dennis Pennis who said: "Somehow it's not sexist." The video was showcased at a music/art event staged by Dazed and Confused magazine, themed around David Cronenberg's film Crash. R.O.C has played live alongside Radiohead and Sneaker Pimps.

Signing to Virgin the following year, they released the Virgin album featuring Dada, based around Idi Amin's laugh, and "Said What I Said". Regarding "Ocean & England", Q said: "It ends with a love song - now that is unsettling". More glowing reviews followed, and endorsements from other artists. At the 1997 Q Awards, Radiohead guitarist Ed O’Brien, accepting Best Album, said he'd have nominated ‘Virgin’.

The album produced two singles: "Cheryl" made the UK singles top 75. Orbital, guest reviewers for Melody Maker, made it Single of the Week. "(Dis)count Us In" received another celebrity review, from Dannii Minogue who said: “This has got the groove, hasn't it? And it's immediate too. Fantastic."

The video for "(Dis)Count", shot by Spanish director Edmundo, featured performance artist David Fryer walking through a sun-drenched Valencia, arms raised. Edmundo said the gesture meant either surrender or victory (Edmundo and Fryer previously made Everything but the Girl's video for "Single").

Despite the album's warm reception, Virgin dropped R.O.C in 1999. R.O.C continued with independent releases, including "2000Mann" on the Spiky record label. They also toured the UK with Sneaker Pimps.

Joining the Brooklyn-based label 12 Apostles in 2004, they were back in the recording studio with long-standing collaborators, producer Danton Supple and bassist Gareth Huw Davies. Night Fold Around Me was released in June 2006. Q said: "In the mid-'90s, R.O.C, like Underworld, tapped into an interesting dance/guitar hybrid. Urban paranoia and moody melody is what they do best...artistically the trio remained an intriguing fringe concern, and this belated third album sees that continuing."

A single, "Princess", was BBC 6 Music's 'Evening Single of the Week' in July 2005. The follow-up, "Journey to the Centre of Brixton" made Playlouder.com's readers' poll best singles of 2005, with radio airplay including BBC Radio 1 and 6 Music (UK) and 2SER (Australia).

In 2014, R.O.C's debut album was reissued on Metal Postcard Records, including for the first time on vinyl, edited from the original 60-minute cd. Uncut said: "Even with hindsight it's hard to fathom what R.O.C were up to. The trio belonged to Britpop like cats belong in the sea. Disco Inferno and AR Kane might have shared their experimental drive, but neither had the same pick-and-mix approach to modern pop or their habit of skewering expectation with every song."

== Discography ==
=== Albums ===
- R.O.C. (1995), Setanta
- Virgin (1997), Virgin
- Night Fold Around Me (2006), 12 Apostles
- R.O.C. (reissue) (2013), Metal Postcard
- Bile & Celestial Beauty (2019), ROC Music

=== Singles ===
- "Dead Step" (1993), Little Star
- "God Willing" (1993), Little Star
- "White Stains" (1994), Little Star
- "X-ine" (1994), Little Star
- "Girl with a Crooked Eye" (1994), Little Star
- "Hey You Chick!" (1996), Virgin
- "Cheryl" (1997), Virgin
- "(Dis)Count Us In" (1997), Virgin
- "Soviva" (1999), rocmusic
- "2000Mann" (2001), Spiky Records
- "I Want You I Need You I Miss You" (2003), rocmusic
- "Princess" (2006), 12 Apostles
- "Journey to the Centre of Brixton" (2006), 12 Apostles
