= Mastertapes =

- Country of origin: United Kingdom
- Language: English
- Home station: BBC Radio 4

Mastertapes is a BBC Radio 4 programme, presented by John Wilson, which discusses the making of significant rock albums. The featured artists are interviewed, in front of an audience, and perform exclusive live tracks, many of which are available on the programme's website. Each album is discussed over two half-hour programmes: the "A side" programme features the artist being interviewed by Wilson, with the "B side" programme featuring questions from the studio audience.

== Episodes ==
Each episode has two parts ("Side A" and "Side B"). The "First broadcast" date refers to "Side A".

=== Series 1 ===
| Episode | Artist | Album | First broadcast |
|---|---|---|---|
| 1 | Billy Bragg | Talking with the Taxman about Poetry (1986) | 30 Oct 2012 |
| 2 | Suzanne Vega | Solitude Standing (1987) | 6 November 2012 |
| 3 | Paul Weller | The Gift (1982) | 13 November 2012 |
| 4 | Brinsley Forde (Aswad) | New Chapter (1981) | 20 November 2012 |
| 5 | Ray Davies | Lola (1970) and Muswell Hillbillies (1971) | 27 November 2012 |
| 6 | Corinne Bailey Rae | The Sea (2010) | 4 December 2012 |
| 7 | Rod Argent, Chris White and Colin Blunstone (The Zombies) | Odessey and Oracle (1968) | 11 December 2012 |

=== Series 2 ===
| Episode | Artist | Album | First broadcast |
|---|---|---|---|
| 1 | Wilko Johnson (Dr. Feelgood) | Down by the Jetty (1975) | 27 May 2013 |
| 2 | Mike Scott and Steve Wickham (The Waterboys) | Fisherman's Blues (1988) | 3 June 2013 |
| 3 | Richard Thompson | Rumor and Sigh (1991) | 10 June 2013 |
| 4 | Eliza and Martin Carthy | Anglicana (2002) | 17 June 2013 |
| 5 | Gary Kemp and Tony Hadley (Spandau Ballet) | True (1983) | 24 June 2013 |

=== Series 3 ===
| Episode | Artist | Album | First broadcast |
|---|---|---|---|
| 1 | Robbie Williams | Life Thru a Lens (1997) | 11 November 2013 |
| 2 | David Crosby | If I Could Only Remember My Name (1971) | 18 November 2013 |
| 3 | Natalie Merchant | Tigerlily (1995) | 25 November 2013 |
| 4 | Edwyn Collins | Gorgeous George (1994) | 2 December 2013 |
| 5 | Jazzie B and Caron Wheeler (Soul II Soul) | Club Classics Vol. One (1989) | 9 December 2013 |

=== Series 4 ===
| Episode | Artist | Album | First broadcast |
|---|---|---|---|
| 1 | Rufus Wainwright | Want One (2003) | 10 November 2014 |
| 2 | Manic Street Preachers | The Holy Bible (1994) | 17 November 2014 |
| 3 | Angélique Kidjo | Ayé (1994) | 24 November 2014 |
| 4 | Bob Geldof (Boomtown Rats) | A Tonic for the Troops (1978) | 1 December 2014 |
| 5 | Noel Gallagher | High Flying Birds (2011) | 8 December 2014 |
| 6 | Sinéad O'Connor | Theology (2007) | 15 December 2014 |

=== Series 5 ===
| Episode | Artist | Album | First broadcast |
|---|---|---|---|
| 1 | Georgie Fame | Rhythm and Blues at the Flamingo (1964) | 21 December 2015 |
| 2 | Glenn Tilbrook and Chris Difford (Squeeze) | East Side Story (1981) | 28 December 2015 |
| 3 | David Hinds and Selwyn Brown (Steel Pulse) | Handsworth Revolution (1978) | 4 January 2016 |
| 4 | Donovan | Sunshine Superman (1966) | 11 January 2016 |
| 5 | Bellowhead | Hedonism (2010) | 18 January 2016 |
| 6 | Nigel Kennedy | Vivaldi's The Four Seasons (1989) | 25 January 2016 |

=== Series 6 ===
| Episode | Artist | Album | First broadcast |
|---|---|---|---|
| 0 | Paul McCartney | Special edition, covering McCartney's career | 27 December 2016 |
| 1 | Laura Marling | Once I Was an Eagle (2013) | 2 January 2017 |
| 2 | Graham Nash | Songs for Beginners (1971), This Path Tonight (2016) | 9 January 2017 |
| 3 | Shirley Collins | Love, Death and the Lady (1969), Lodestar (2016) | 16 January 2017 |
| 4 | Craig David | Born To Do It (2000), Following My Intuition (2010) | 23 January 2017 |
| 5 | Tom Jones | Praise and Blame (2010) | 30 January 2017 |
| 6 | Randy Newman | Sail Away (1972) | 28 August 2017 |
