= This Is the Love =

Single by Spandau Ballet

from the album The Story: The Very Best of Spandau Ballet
- Released: October 2014
- Recorded: 2014
- Genre: Pop
- Length: 3:44
- Label: Rhino
- Songwriter: Gary Kemp
- Producer: Trevor Horn

Spandau Ballet singles chronology
"Once More" (2009)	"This Is the Love" (2014)	"Steal" (2014)

"This Is the Love" is a song by the English new wave band Spandau Ballet, released as the first single from their 2014 compilation album The Story: The Very Best of Spandau Ballet.

== Background ==
Spandau Ballet reunited for a tour in 2009 after being apart for almost thirty years. The success of the tour led to the re-recording of their hits for an acoustic album titled Once More. Two new songs were included, one of which, the title track, reached number 82 on the UK Singles Chart, making it their first chart appearance there since 1990.

On 31 July 2014 the band announced on their website that they were "working on new material with Trevor Horn," with whom they had last worked on the 1984 charity song "Do They Know It's Christmas?" Horn also remixed Spandau Ballet's Diamond track "Instinction" in 1982. On 18 August 2014 a post on their website explained that the new material consisted of three tracks to be released in October on a compilation titled The Story: The Very Best of Spandau Ballet, one of the three being "This Is the Love".

== Commercial performance ==
In the US "This Is the Love" spent 8 weeks on Billboard magazine's Dance Club Songs chart that began in December 2015, during which time it peaked at number 20.

== Critical reception ==
In his review of The Story Timothy Monger of AllMusic wrote that all three of the new songs were "of surprisingly good craftsmanship, showing that both the group and Horn are still capable of producing vital material." He wrote, "The single 'This Is the Love' is a richly realized, sax-laden pop gem that could have been made during their mid-80's heyday."

== Charts ==
Weekly chart performance for "This Is the Love"
Chart (2014)	Peak position
US Dance Club Songs (Billboard)	20
