= Gavin Martin =

Northern Irish music journalist (1961–2022)

- Born: 14 December 1961; Belfast, Northern Ireland
- Died: 10 March 2022 (aged 60); Barbados
- Occupation: Music journalist
- Years active: 1977–2022

Gavin Martin (14 December 1961 – 10 March 2022) was a Northern Irish music journalist.

== Life and career ==
Gavin Martin was born in Belfast, Northern Ireland, in 1961. His family moved to Bangor, County Down in 1964, and Martin lived there until 1979. He was educated at Ballyholme Primary School (1966–1972) Bangor Grammar School (1972–1976) and Bangor Technical College (1977).

Martin's first piece was published in 1974 in John Sadler's The Sun pop column when he was 13. In 1977, he co-founded and published the punk fanzine Alternative Ulster, which soon lent its title to the Stiff Little Fingers song. Contributors to the fanzine included Mark E. Smith of the Fall, whom Martin brought to Belfast to play at a time when the Northern Irish civil unrest known as the Troubles (1969–1997) meant many bands refused to tour in the province. Alternative Ulster covered the rise of Belfast's punk scene with reviews and interviews of local bands such as Rudi, Ruefrex, Protex Blue, and the Undertones, and key events like the visit to Belfast of the Clash in 1977.

Martin had his first professional writings on music published in the NME in his teens when he became the NME's Irish correspondent from 1978–1979, covering the Northern Irish punk/post-punk music scene.

He moved to London in late 1979, and became a features writer and later media editor for the NME. In a lengthy career writing for the magazine, he interviewed and wrote features on many of the leading musicians of the period, including Marvin Gaye, Nina Simone, James Brown, BB King, Willie Dixon, Willie Nelson, Joe Strummer, Bruce Springsteen, The Sex Pistols, U2 (whose first feature article he wrote), Van Morrison, Neil Young, Madonna, Leonard Cohen, and many more.

Martin went on to edit the paper's movie section interviewing stars such as Dave Allen, Denzel Washington and Al Pacino. He also hosted and curated the annual NME Rock n Reel film events at the NFT Film Festival with Blur, Noddy Holder, Matt Lucas, Quentin Tarantino and Mike Leigh among the guests.

Martin's essay on Michael Jackson was included in The Faber Book of Pop, while his essays on Van Morrison and Frank Sinatra appeared in Rock and Roll Is Here to Stay: An Anthology.

Martin has written for many publications including Classic Rock, Rock n Roll Confidential, The Times, The Guardian, Vox, Uncut, The Independent, The European, Loaded, GQ, and Record Collector. Martin's work also features on the Rocksbackpages website. He was the Daily Mirror's music critic from 2001–2020. His weekly column featuring album reviews and interview features included interviews with Paul McCartney, Madonna, Sinead O’Connor, Shane MacGowan, Ronnie Wood (Rolling Stones), Robert Plant (Led Zeppelin), Lou Reed, Stevie Nicks (Fleetwood Mac), Blondie, PJ Harvey, James Blunt, The Killers, Fatboy Slim, Black Eyed Peas, The Chemical Brothers, Super Furry Animals, Travis, Placebo, Depeche Mode, Cee Lo Green, Ellie Goulding, Shakira, Marilyn Manson, Nigel Tufnel (Spinal Tap).

In 2009, Martin worked with journalist Suzanne Moore on a TV series based on Pete Frame's Rock Family Trees.

Martin created and curated a series of live events called Talking Musical Revolutions. These themed evenings centred on the music and life of artists including Lee Perry, David Bowie, Jimi Hendrix, Amy Winehouse and Elvis Presley. Latterly it featured one-on-one onstage interviews with musicians such as Mike Scott (The Waterboys), Suggs (Madness), Noddy Holder (Slade), and Kevin Rowland (Dexys Midnight Runners), which helped pave the way to another venture: Martin's debut album, Talking Musical Revolutions, released in December 2016. Based around the spoken word poems and pieces Martin had been writing and performing since 2008, the album featured a host of musicians from across the UK, and was produced by Kelly Munro (End of the Trail Records).

Martin moved to Hastings in 2014, and to St Leonards-on-Sea, East Sussex, in 2015.

Martin died aged 60 while on holiday in Barbados with his wife Kate, in March 2022.
