= Steal (song) =

Single by Spandau Ballet

from the album The Story: The Very Best of Spandau Ballet
- Released: 2014
- Recorded: 2014
- Genre: Pop
- Length: 4:28
- Label: Reformation; Rhino
- Songwriter: Gary Kemp
- Producer: Trevor Horn

Spandau Ballet singles chronology
"This Is the Love" (2014)	"Steal" (2014)	"Soul Boy" (2015)

"Steal" is a song by the English new wave band Spandau Ballet, released as the second single from their 2014 compilation album The Story: The Very Best of Spandau Ballet.

== Commercial performance ==
In the US "Steal" spent its sole week on Billboard magazine's Adult Contemporary chart at number 30.

== Critical reception ==
In his review of The Story Timothy Monger of AllMusic wrote that all three of the new songs were "of surprisingly good craftsmanship, showing that both the group and Horn are still capable of producing vital material." In a 2015 concert review, John Reed of noise11.com wrote, "If not for the sad state of modern Top 40 radio, 'Steal' might have become a huge comeback single." He also described the song as "an outstanding soulful tune".

== Charts ==
Weekly chart performance for "Steal"
Chart (2015)	Peak position
US Adult Contemporary (Billboard)	30
