= Danton Supple =

British producer

- Born: November 17, 1965 (age 60)
- Origin: London, England
- Genres: Alternative rock, pop
- Occupations: Record producer, mixer
- Years active: 1985–present
- Website: dantonsupple.com

Danton Supple is a British record producer and mixer, best known for his work with Coldplay.

== Early career (1985–1994) ==
Danton Supple was introduced to the world of recording studios in the 1980s, at his girlfriend's uncle Paddy Kingsland's BBC radiophonic workshop studios in Hammersmith, West London, "a place full of technology and music". Lacking the then required grade 8 in music to do a related course at college level, he instead looked into a way of turning his knowledge of maths and physics to getting a job in a studio and work his way up. While working at the recently established Shoreditch-based Strongroom Studios in 1986, Supple was introduced to a visiting producer from SARM Studios, leading to four years of audio training in West London. During his time at SARM, Supple did every job "from manning the reception to working behind the mixing desk or editing tape", eventually working alongside producer Trevor Horn as assistant engineer. Three years at the now defunct Westside Studios followed, engineering sessions for Clive Langer and Alan Winstanley and honing his skills with recording bands and acoustic instruments, before eventually going freelance in 1994.

== Record producer and mixer (1994–present) ==
Initially, Supple's freelance career focused mostly on mixing and engineering, working with artists as diverse as Pet Shop Boys, Morrissey, Jimmy Nail, Cathy Dennis, U2 or Suede among many others. He also increasingly moved into production, with R.O.C.'s eponymous 1996 debut album and Morrissey's 1997 Rare Tracks album amongst his first producer credits.

In 2003, Danton Supple co-produced British indie rock band Starsailor's gold-certified second studio album Silence Is Easy with Phil Spector and John Leckie, which reached number 2 in the UK charts in September 2003. The album's third single "Four to the Floor" produced by Supple attained chart positions around Europe and Australia, reaching number one in France and Wallonia.

Having previously mixed English rock band Coldplay's 2002 breakthrough album A Rush of Blood to the Head, the band opted to bring him on board as producer to start over on their troubled third studio album, which had been slated for a 2004 release but had already been delayed due to the band's dissatisfaction with the sound achieved from previous sessions. X&Y was released to general critical acclaim in June 2005, with NME seeing it as reinforcing the band's status as "the band of their time". The album was the worldwide best-selling album of 2005, receiving multiple music awards as well as nominations including Best Rock Album and Best Rock Song at the 48th Grammy Awards.

In 2009, Supple produced Spandau Ballet's seventh and final studio album, Once More. The same year, he engineered U2's compilation album The Best of 1980-2000 and produced the charity record War Child 10, among other projects.

In the last decade, Supple has worked extensively as producer, engineer and mixer with artists including Thirteen Senses, Starsailor, Tina Arena, Norma Jean Martine, Charlie Simpson, Oh Baby, Elbow, Amy Macdonald and Kylie Minogue.

Supple's most recent production work includes American singer-songwriter Ben Wylen's debut album People Say, released in 2020.
