= Communication (Spandau Ballet song) =

Single by Spandau Ballet

from the album True
- Released: 4 February 1983
- Recorded: 1982
- Studio: Compass Point (Nassau, The Bahamas)
- Genre: Pop
- Length: 3:24 (7" version); 3:36 (album version); 4:28 (12" version: "Club Mix"); 2:42 (7" B-side: "Edited Club")
- Label: Chrysalis; Reformation
- Songwriter: Gary Kemp
- Producers: Tony Swain; Steve Jolley; Spandau Ballet

Spandau Ballet singles chronology
"Lifeline" (1982)	"Communication" (1983)	"True" (1983)

"Communication" is a song by the English new wave band Spandau Ballet, released on 4 February 1983 as the second single from what would be their third album, True. The song was recorded at Compass Point Studios in Nassau, Bahamas along with most of the material from that album and received several good reviews. It reached number 12 on the UK Singles Chart and made the pop charts in other countries as well. The music video for the song was made to look like a film with lead singer Tony Hadley as the main character and received airplay on the U.S. cable channel MTV.

== Background ==
Spandau Ballet chose Buggles founder Trevor Horn to remix the song "Instinction" from their 1982 album Diamond to release as a single, and, in doing so, the band began a shift from dance music to more of a pop sound. Their guitarist/songwriter Gary Kemp changed his style of writing to reflect this new direction for their next album, and the band chose to produce the album with Tony Swain and Steve Jolley, who liked Kemp's new compositions titled "Communication" and "Lifeline" the most. The latter became the first single from the album and reached number 7 on the UK Singles Chart in fall 1982. It had been recorded in Paddington at Red Bus Studios, but the band traveled to The Bahamas to work on "Communication" and six other songs for the new album at Compass Point Studios in Nassau.

Chrysalis executives were impressed with the LP, especially the tracks titled "Gold" and "True", but as Kemp explained in his autobiography I Know This Much: From Soho to Spandau, the band's manager insisted that a different song should be the "Lifeline" follow-up. "[Steve] Dagger didn't want to go with a ballad next and recommended another up-tempo first. 'Communication' got the band vote. Why we didn’t go straight for 'True' or 'Gold' as the next single, I'm not sure. Maybe we felt their success would be automatic and wanted to save them for later, during the album's release."

== Critical reception ==
Spandau Ballet - "Communication"
Lead singer Tony Hadley's vocals were described as "confident" and "soulful".

"Communication" made the list of "Fresh and Active" singles being recommended in Record Mirror magazine by Robin Smith, who highlighted the tropical surroundings of their recording sessions: "Under swaying palms, Spandau serve up a neat cocktail." Cash Box magazine praised the song for its "combination of Eurodisco rhythms and a confident lead vocal track". Fred Dellar of Smash Hits was more ambivalent, writing that the band members "'woo-woo' and 'hee-up-up' in best vocal back-up mode, the rhythm trundling on amid organ stabs. Very slick, very commercial." When the song was released on the album True, Ira Robbins of Trouser Press noted that the LP's "two impressive numbers, 'Communication' and 'Lifeline', both match stylish presentation with solid songwriting and a modicum of soulful crooning." The editors of Record Business credited Jolley and Swain for the band having "cut out the self-indulgent frills which threatened to submerge them" and thought "Communication" was "a fair example of the new Ballet style, a very direct and simple song executed with no little flair." In Rip It Up magazine, Mark Phillips reviewed the 12-inch single and warned, "There is no denying this is a good song, but suffering the 12-inch is almost a chore. Some horrific echo-dub passages ruin the opening bars and, although it gets better, you'd be wise to stick with the album version."

== Release and commercial performance ==
"Communication" was released on 4 February 1983 and peaked at number 12 in the UK, number 10 in New Zealand, number 13 in Ireland, number 19 in Sweden, and number 24 in Australia. In the U.S. it began 6 weeks paired with "Lifeline" on Billboard magazine's Dance/Disco Top 80 chart in the 4 June 1983 issue and eventually reached number 58. The 7-inch single for "Communication" was not released there until after "True" and "Gold", the third and fourth singles from the True album, completed their chart runs, debuting on the Billboard Hot 100 in the 31 March 1984 issue and peaking at number 59 over the course of 7 weeks.

The album was released in the UK on 4 March 1983, and debuted on the UK Albums Chart on 12 March, the same week that "Communication" peaked at number 12. Kemp felt that the success of "Communication" was hampered by the fact that "radio DJs were all playing the album track 'True' instead… By public demand, 'True' would be our next single."

== Music video ==
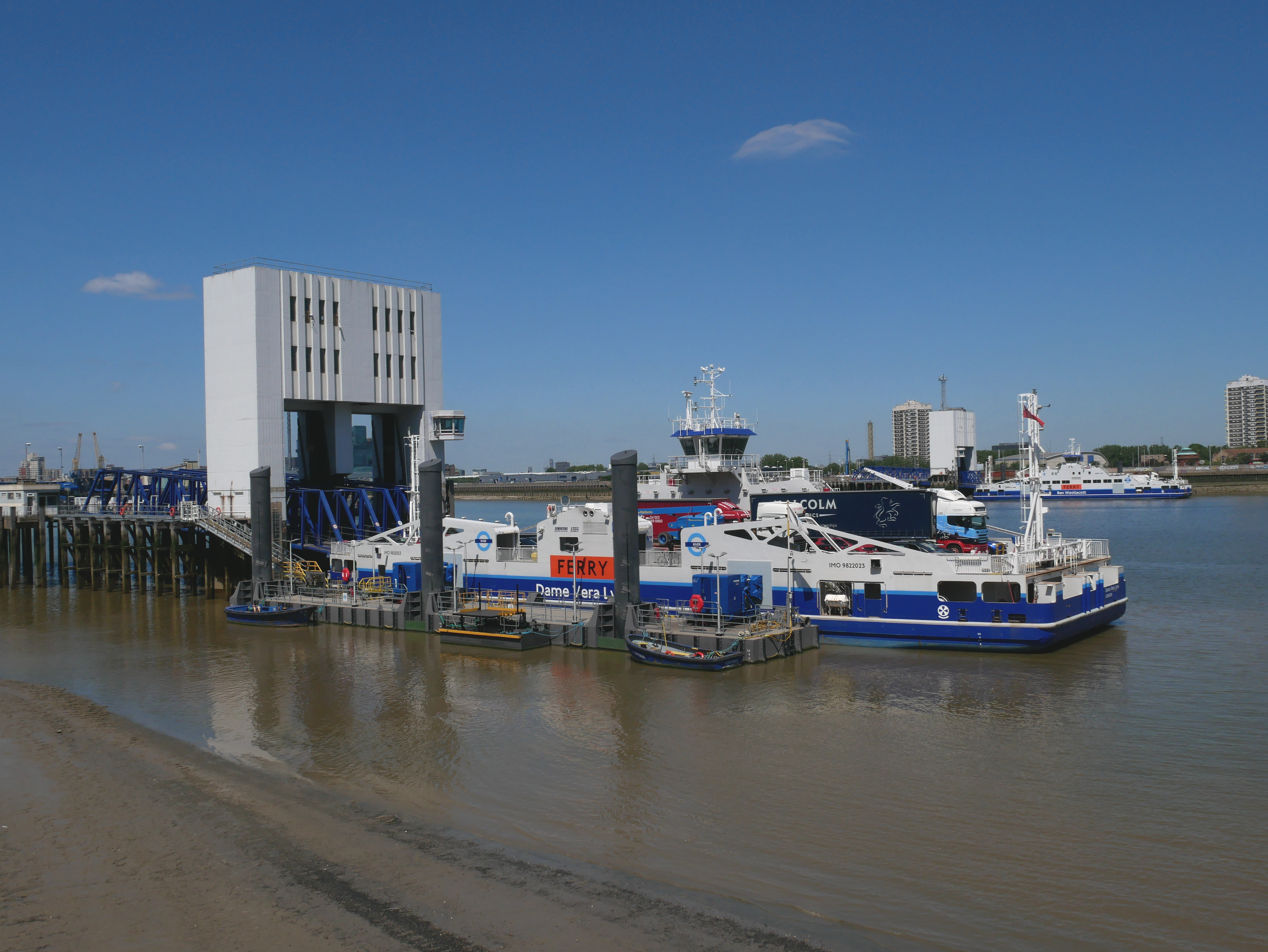
The photographer played by Tony Hadley in the music video is hired to shoot a transaction that takes place on the Woolwich Ferry.

During the filming of the promotional clip for "Communication", Kemp told Betty Page of Record Mirror, "We were totally fed up with video and its cliches. We wanted a more physical thing, so we thought, let's make it a proper film, have a minute's dialogue on the front, give it titles, make it a whole package and go one step ahead of everything that's been done." Page described the video as "an action-packed clip planned to look like an episode of The Professionals", and Kemp called it "a gritty Sweeney-esque film." Although Chris Springhall directed the video, Kemp assisted with both the writing and directing. Lead singer Tony Hadley was the only band member to appear in it, and Kemp explained that it was because "we were concerned that our singer's profile wasn't as high as it should have been". He divulged that his brother, band bassist Martin Kemp, was "quietly seething" over not being in it. Hadley played a professional photographer hired to take pictures of a transaction that takes place on the Woolwich Ferry. The man requesting the work was played by former professional boxer John Conteh, who admitted to watching The Long Good Friday four times in preparation for the role. Quadrophenia actress Leslie Ash portrayed the love interest. For the car chase from the ferry after the photographer has taken the pictures requested, Hadley did his own stunt driving.

"Communication" was listed on the reports that MTV provided to Billboard that indicated what videos were in rotation on the cable network and made its first appearance there in the 25 February 1984 issue, which indicated that it had been added to their playlist as of 15 February.

== Formats and track listings ==
- 7-inch single
1. "Communication" — 3:24
2. "Communication (Edited Club)" — 2:42
- 12-inch single
1. "Communication (Club Mix)" — 4:28
2. "Communication" — 3:36

== Personnel ==
Credits adapted from the liner notes for True, except as noted:

Spandau Ballet

- Tony Hadley – lead vocals
- Gary Kemp – guitar and backing vocals
- Martin Kemp – bass
- Steve Norman – saxophone and percussion
- John Keeble – drums

Additional musician

- Jess Bailey – keyboards

Production

- Tony Swain – producer
- Steve Jolley – producer
- Spandau Ballet – producers
- David Band – sleeve

== Charts ==
Chart performance for "Communication"
Chart (1983–1984)	Peak position
Australia (Kent Music Report)	24
Ireland (IRMA)	13
Luxembourg (Radio Luxembourg)	8
New Zealand (Recorded Music NZ)	10
Sweden (Sverigetopplistan)	19
UK Singles (OCC)	12
US Billboard Hot 100	59
US Dance Club Songs (Billboard) with "Lifeline"	58
US Cash Box Top 100 Singles	80

== Bibliography ==
- Kemp, Gary (2009). I Know This Much: From Soho to Spandau. London: Fourth Estate. ISBN 978-0-00-732330-2.
- Kent, David (1993). Australian Chart Book 1970–1992 (illustrated ed.). St Ives, N.S.W.: Australian Chart Book. ISBN 0-646-11917-6.
