= David Kent (historian) =

Australian historian (born 1941)

- Born: David Cyril Kent; 3 February 1941 (age 85); Mount Lawley, Western Australia, Australia
- Occupations: Music historian, writer
- Writing career
- Genre: Music culture
- Subjects: Rock music, popular culture
- Website: austchartbook.com.au

David Cyril Kent (born 3 February 1941) is an Australian music historian and pop culture writer. Kent produced the Kent Music Report, compiling the national music chart from May 1974 to 1996; it was known as the Australian Music Report from 1987. The music reports were a weekly listing of the National Top 100 chart positions of singles and albums.

Kent's music reports were used by Australian Recording Industry Association (ARIA) as its official ARIA Charts from mid-1983 until July 1988 when ARIA developed an in-house chart.

Kent continued to publish his Australian Music Report on a weekly basis until 1996. In 1993, Kent collated his charts into a book, Australian Chart Book, 1970–1992. He followed with Australian Chart Book (1940–1969) in 2005, Australian Chart Book (1993–2005) in 2006, and The Australian top 20 book (1940–2006) in 2007.

== Early life ==
David Kent was born in Mount Lawley (a suburb of Perth), Western Australia, Australia, to Cyril Kent (an industrial chemist) and Marjorie Goodwin (née Dalton).

He listened to local radio broadcasts of top hits such as "Rock Around the Clock" by Bill Haley in 1955.

Australia had no nationwide chart system for singles or albums when Kent was a youth. Kent kept his own tally of the positions provided by Sydney radio stations.

== Career ==
Kent initially worked for record companies, EMI and Polygram, and avidly collected record charts as hobby

In 1958, radio station 2UE provided the first give-away charts in record stores, with the first national chart, compiled for Go-Set magazine by rock journalist Ed Nimmervoll, appearing in October 1966. For 18 months, Kent researched Australian music charts and developed a ranking system based on radio station charts from around the country, and from May 1974 he compiled the Kent Music Report.

Kent's aims were to provide the Australian music industry with information on singles and albums, and to chronicle the history of music tastes. The Kent Music Report was sold commercially after July 1974, and it became the sole nationwide chart following the demise of Go-Set in August.

Kent expanded his business and, from 1976, incorporated actual sales figures to supplement information from radio stations. By 1977, major record companies used his chart information in their advertising. Kent's staff sent surveys to retail stores, collated sales figures together with radio charts by states and then used his ranking system to assemble the national Kent Music Report. By 1982, retail sales by survey was the main source of Kent's reports.

The Australian Recording Industry Association (ARIA) was established by the six major record companies operating in Australia: EMI, Festival Records, CBS (now known as Sony Music), RCA (now known as BMG), WEA (now known as Warner Music) and Polygram (now known as Universal). ARIA licensed the Kent Music Report from mid-1983 to publish the ARIA Charts under its banner until the week ending 26 June 1988. ARIA had established its own research and chart publishing group and now competed with the Kent Music Report.

At the beginning of 1987, the Kent Music Report was renamed the Australian Music Report. It was used by major record companies in preference to ARIA's own charts. Kent continued production of his music reports until 1996, but sold off his interest in the Australian Music Report, which continued to the end of 1998, after which changes in technology, such as barcoding, enabled point-of-sale information to be sent directly to ARIA. This meant that Kent could no longer compile reliable sales information.

== Publications ==
In 1993, Kent used his resources to compile charts dating back to 1970. He added information from the weekly Kent Music Report and the Australian Music Report to publish the charts in book form as Australian Chart Book, 1970–1992. He followed that with Australian Chart Book (1940–1969) in 2005, Australian Chart Book (1993–2005) in 2006, The Australian top 20 book (1940–2006) in 2007, and Australian Chart Chronicles (1940–2009).

== Bibliography ==
- Kent, David (29 June 1987). "Kent music report 1974–1987". Australian Music Report (1–675). St Ives, N.S.W.: David Kent, 1987. ISSN 0156-2223.
- Kent, David (1993). Australian Chart Book 1970–1992. St Ives, N.S.W.: Australian Chart Book. ISBN 0-646-11917-6.
- Kent, David (4 January 1999). "Australian music report : Kent music report 1987–1999". Australian Music Report (675–1270). Pymble, N.S.W.: Australian Music Report, 1987–1999. ISSN 0156-2223.
- Kent, David (2005). Australian Chart Book (1940–1969). Turramurra, N.S.W.: Australian Chart Book, 2005. ISBN 0-646-44439-5.
- Kent, David (2006). Australian Chart Book (1993–2005). Turramurra, N.S.W.: Australian Chart Book, 2006. ISBN 0-646-45889-2.
- Kent, David (2007). The Australian top 20 book (1940–2006). Turramurra, N.S.W.: Australian Chart Book, 2007. ISBN 978-0-646-47665-0.
- Kent, David (2009). Australian Chart Chronicles (1940–2008). Turramurra, N.S.W.: Australian Chart Book, 2009. ISBN 978-0-646-51203-7.
- Kent, David, ed. (2010). Australian Chart Book (1993–2009). Australian Chart Book. ISBN 978-0-646-52995-0.
