= Lifeline (Spandau Ballet song) =

Single by Spandau Ballet

from the album True
- B-side: "Live and Let Live"
- Released: 24 September 1982
- Recorded: 16–20 August 1982
- Studio: Red Bus (London)
- Genre: Pop; blue-eyed soul
- Length: 3:20 (7" version); 3:33 (album version); 5:17 (12" version)
- Label: Chrysalis; Reformation
- Songwriter: Gary Kemp
- Producers: Tony Swain; Steve Jolley; Spandau Ballet

Spandau Ballet singles chronology
| "Instinction" (1982) | "Lifeline" (1982) | "Communication" (1983) |

"Lifeline" is a song by the English new wave band Spandau Ballet, released on 24 September 1982 as the first single from what would be their third album, True (1983). The song confirmed the band's intent to transition from dance music to pop that was hinted at with their previous single, "Instinction". Some band members found an enjoyable chemistry with "Lifeline" producers Tony Swain and Steve Jolley that was lacking in recording sessions with previous producers. The new song received mixed reviews but reached number 7 on the UK Singles Chart. It was also their first single to chart in the United States, missing the Billboard Hot 100 but charting on the Bubbling Under Hot 100 at number 8. The music video for the song received airplay on the U.S. cable channel MTV.

== Background ==
"She Loved Like Diamond" was the third single from Spandau Ballet's second album, Diamond, but after its number 49 showing on the UK Singles Chart in early 1982, the band feared that their future was in jeopardy. They hired Buggles founder Trevor Horn to remix the Diamond track "Instinction" in order to have another single to promote the release of the LP, but Spandau songwriter Gary Kemp was concerned about putting the most pop-sounding song on the record in the hands of a pop producer.

Spandau Ballet made a point of representing their peers in the London club scene that began with their first album, Journeys to Glory, but after the "Instinction" remix went to number 10, Kemp found that the nightclub crowd was no longer interested in their music, which meant he no longer had to focus solely on what they wanted to hear. In his autobiography I Know This Much: From Soho to Spandau, he wrote, "The freedom of not having to write just for Soho meant I could dive into that great big reservoir of pop, deep with melody and soul, and hopefully surface with the pearls I wanted. Where previously it had been about riffs and grooves, this time it would be about melody and chords." He also averred that Spandau Ballet "felt no shame in embracing" a pop audience.

The band attempted to continue their work with Horn, who was especially interested in a new song Kemp had written called "Pleasure", but after a day of rehearsals in which drummer John Keeble was unable to satisfy Horn's demands, the new producer was ready to replace him. Kemp rejected the idea, and Horn decided to end his work with the band. Kemp told Smash Hits magazine in 1982, "We couldn't have worked with Trevor because he was too overpowering, too dogmatic." The band's manager, Steve Dagger, suggested producers Tony Swain and Steve Jolley, who had recently worked with Bananarama, so the band presented the duo with several songs Kemp had finished writing. The plan was to have them produce just one single to get a sense if they were right for the group before committing to anything more, and although "Communication" was considered, the song Jolley chose for their assignment was the "up-tempo, more obvious pop sing-along" "Lifeline". Spandau Ballet was credited alongside Jolley and Swain as producers of "Lifeline" as well as their next album, True.

== Recording ==
The band discovered some chemistry with their new producers during the recording of "Lifeline", which took place in Paddington at Red Bus Studios in August 1982. Kemp found affinity with Swain, who did his own engineering; Kemp joined him at the mixing console to discuss the sounds and arrangements. Lead singer Tony Hadley, who had clashed with Diamond producer Richard James Burgess, felt much more comfortable with Jolley, who became the sole producer of his vocals. Because of what Hadley went through while recording Diamond, Kemp stayed out of the vocal recording sessions for "Lifeline"; he found that Jolley's love of soul music gave him insight as to how to soften Hadley's voice with methods different from what Burgess had tried and that the focus became "the story being told within the song".

== Critical reception ==
Spandau Ballet – "Lifeline"
The backing vocals were noted for "an exceedingly catchy vocal hook decorating the breaks between the chorus and verse".

"Lifeline" received mixed reviews upon its release. Johnny Black of Smash Hits found fault with the lyrics and complained that Spandau Ballet "wail[ed] in a manner barely distinguishable from notable Californian leisure-lovers like the Eagles". Record Mirror's Mark Cooper lumped it in with "classy, well-produced funk ballads with strong choruses and no personality" and summarized it as "hummably bland".

Mark Phillips for Rip It Up described it as "in its way not unpleasant, but very white and insipid and not likely to win them any new fans". When the song was released on the album True, Ira Robbins of Trouser Press wrote that the album's "two impressive numbers, 'Communication' and 'Lifeline', both match stylish presentation with solid songwriting and a modicum of soulful crooning." In a review of the band's concert at New York's Savoy in 1983, Kim Freeman of Billboard magazine thought that "'Lifeline' was an upbeat orchestration that came off beautifully live".

In a retrospective review on AllMusic, Stewart Mason also criticized the lyrics but still opined that "Lifeline" was their "first truly great single". He praised the fact that "Hadley wisely dials back his occasionally pompous, stentorian delivery for a more relaxed vocal style more in keeping with the relaxed pop-R&B groove" and that the backing vocals "include an exceedingly catchy vocal hook decorating the breaks between the chorus and verse".

== Release and commercial performance ==
"Lifeline" was released on 24 September 1982 and peaked at number 7 on the UK Singles Chart, number 11 in Ireland, number 33 in New Zealand, and number 68 in Australia. In the 4 June 1983 issue of Billboard, it became their first single to come close to the pop chart in the U.S. when it began its first of two weeks "bubbling under" Billboard's Hot 100; it got as high as number 108. In that same issue it also began 6 weeks on the magazine's Dance/Disco Top 80 chart paired with "Communication" and eventually reached number 58.

== Music video ==
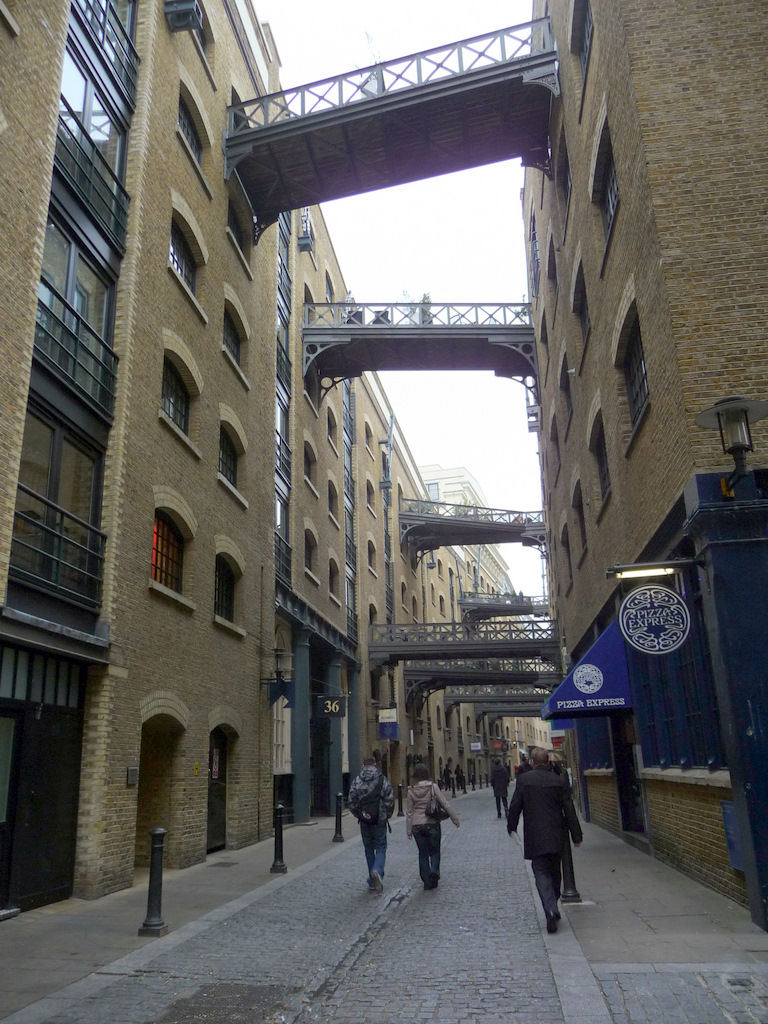
The band's performance in the music video ostensibly takes place in a building on Shad Thames.

Kemp acknowledged that the clothes they wore for the "Lifeline" music video were "drab" and that the shift to pop left them "caught in a moment of not knowing what to wear". He bemoaned the fact that director Russell Mulcahy, who had worked with them on most of their previous videos, was busy working with Duran Duran and unavailable to film the clip for "Lifeline". Instead, Steve Barron directed the video, filmed on 7 September in a hayloft in a rural part of Britain. The establishing shot that opens the video, however, shows a row of buildings along Shad Thames, and there is a recurring motif of a red beam of energy that is occasionally shown travelling along utility pole wires until the end of the song when it blasts through the window of the Java Wharf building in which the band plays. The bridge in the scene with three girls is the footbridge over Laverstock Road at Godolphin School in Salisbury.

"Lifeline" was listed on the reports that MTV provided to Billboard that indicated what videos were in rotation on the cable network and made its first appearance there in the 7 May 1983 issue, which indicated that it had been added to their playlist as of 27 April.

== Aftermath ==
In his autobiography Pop Stars in My Pantry: A Memoir of Pop Mags and Clubbing in the 1980s, music journalist Paul Simper detailed Graham Smith's reactions to a couple of singles by Spandau Ballet, who initially wanted to make "white European disco music" to appeal to the patrons of the Blitz, a weekly Tuesday night club the band had been attending. Smith, a Blitz regular who had designed the cover art for Spandau Ballet's first two albums and their singles, encountered Simper while delivering the cover he had produced for "She Loved Like Diamond" and was already losing interest in the band, but upon receiving a copy of "Lifeline" several months later, Smith was visibly disappointed as he played a cassette of the new "mop-top-flavoured" song for Simper, who concluded, "Spandau were no longer making records for the cool kids."

== Formats and track listings ==
- 7-inch single
1. "Lifeline" – 3:20
2. "Live and Let Live" – 3:46
- 12-inch single
1. "Lifeline" – 5:17
2. "Live and Let Live" – 5:29

== Personnel ==
Credits adapted from the liner notes for True, except as noted:

Spandau Ballet

- Tony Hadley – lead vocals
- Gary Kemp – guitar and backing vocals
- Martin Kemp – bass
- Steve Norman – saxophone and percussion
- John Keeble – drums

Additional Musicians

- Jess Bailey - keyboards

Production

- Tony Swain – producer
- Steve Jolley – producer
- Spandau Ballet – producers; sleeve
- Graham Smith – sleeve
- Andy Earl – photography

== Charts ==
Chart performance for "Lifeline"
| Chart (1982–1983) | Peak position |
|---|---|
| Australia (Kent Music Report) | 68 |
| Ireland (IRMA) | 11 |
| Luxembourg (Radio Luxembourg) | 3 |
| New Zealand (Recorded Music NZ) | 33 |
| UK Singles (OCC) | 7 |
| US Bubbling Under the Hot 100 (Billboard) | 108 |
| US Dance Club Songs (Billboard) with "Communication" | 58 |

== Bibliography ==
- Gimarc, George (1997). Post Punk Diary, 1980–1982. St. Martin's Press. ISBN 978-0-312-16968-8.
- Hadley, Tony (2004). To Cut a Long Story Short. Sidgwick & Jackson. ISBN 978-0-283-07386-1.
- Kemp, Gary (2009). I Know This Much: From Soho to Spandau. London: Fourth Estate. ISBN 978-0-00-732330-2.
- Kent, David (1993). Australian Chart Book 1970–1992 (illustrated ed.). St Ives, N.S.W.: Australian Chart Book. ISBN 0-646-11917-6.
- Whitburn, Joel (2009). Joel Whitburn's Top Pop Singles, 1955–2008. Record Research Inc. ISBN 978-0-89820-180-2.
