= John Wilson (broadcaster) =

British journalist and broadcaster (born 1965)

John Richard Wilson (born 2 August 1965) is a British journalist and broadcaster.

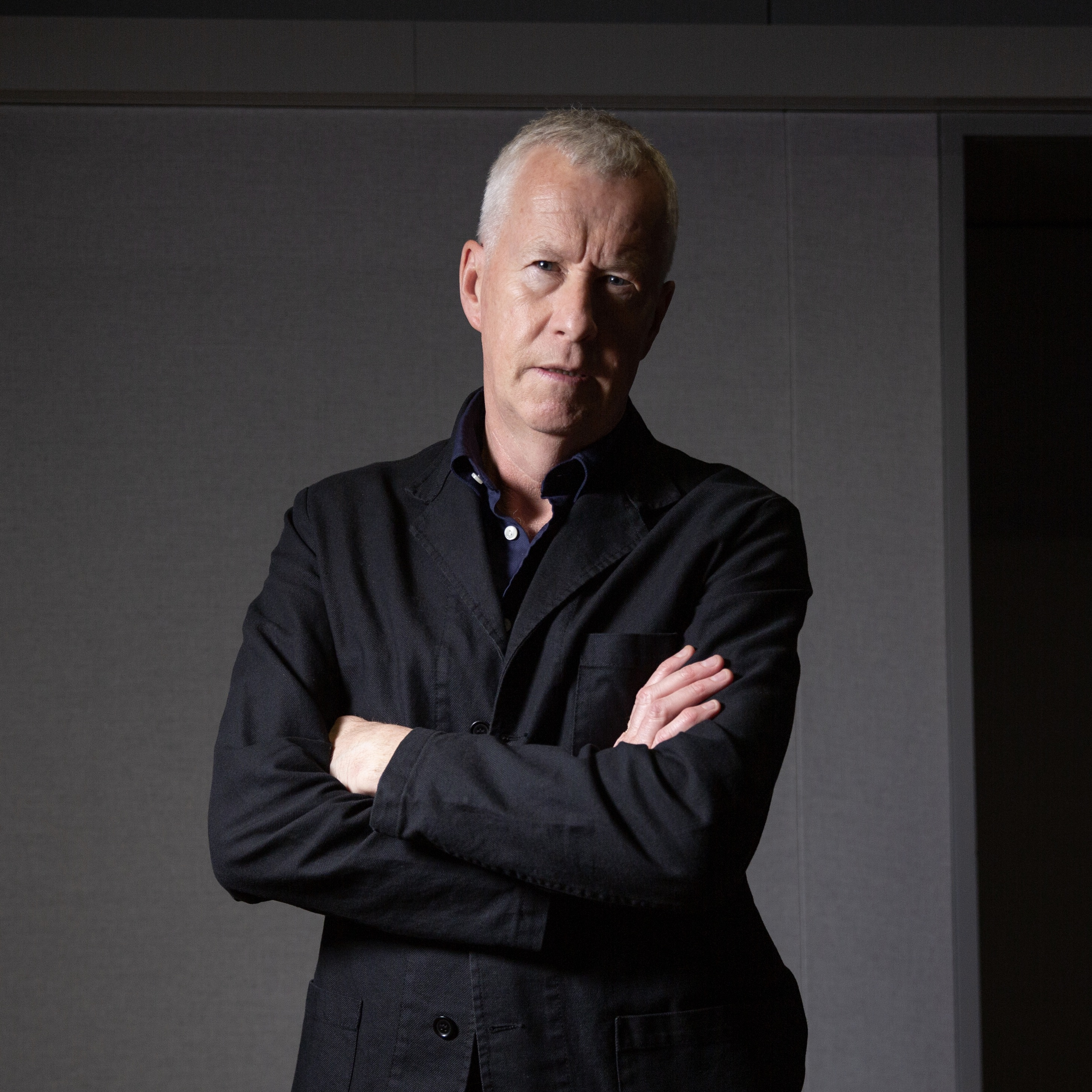
John Wilson, 2023

== Career ==
John Wilson is a journalist and broadcaster who specialises in arts and cultural affairs. He presents This Cultural Life, the BBC Radio 4 interview series and international podcast, with guests including Paul McCartney, Margaret Atwood, Nick Cave, Tracey Emin, Nicole Kidman, Whoopi Goldberg, Frank Auerbach, Judi Dench and many more. The series is also televised on BBC Four, and is shown on BBC News and globally on BBC World.

Wilson presented BBC Radio 4's flagship arts magazine series Front Row from its launch in 1998 until he left the show in 2021. His interviewees included David Bowie and Kate Bush. He was also the host of the music series Mastertapes between 2012 and 2019. Sinead O’Connor, Robbie Williams, Paul Weller, Emeli Sande, Randy Newman, David Crosby and Elvis Costello were among the guests who appeared on the show, recorded in front of an audience at the BBC's Maida Vale Studios. A special edition with Paul McCartney was filmed by BBC television.

Wilson is also often heard on BBC Radio's 4 flagship current affairs programme Today, and has presented and produced dozens of series and documentaries including The Price of Song, Epiphanies, In The Studio and the Sony Award-nominated series Meeting Myself Coming Back.

In 2020 Wilson produced and presented the documentary film The Billion Dollar Art Hunt for BBC4, in which he investigated the world's biggest ever art heist. Paintings by Vermeer, Rembrandt and Degas were stolen from the Isabella Stewart Gardner Museum, Boston, in 1990, a crime that remains unsolved. Other television credits include live presenting the 2020 Booker Prize, the 2021 Museum of the Year Award on BBC News, and various editions of Newsnight Review on BBC2. He was part of the on-screen line up of the BBC2 version of Front Row.

In the 2018 Christmas University Challenge series, Wilson captained a team of fellow alumni of the University of Southampton. He hosted the Sir Peter Blake 90th birthday tribute show at the Royal Festival Hall, featuring The Who, Paul Weller, Chrissie Hynde, Madness and Noel Gallagher, in 2022. He has reported on art and cultural affairs from around the world, including Iran on several occasions, and made a radio documentary in China about the Terracotta Warriors and the First Emperor. He has written about cultural affairs for a range of publications including The Observer, The Guardian, The Times, The Independent, Art Newspaper and Time Out. He worked as a reporter on the Camden New Journal in north London before beginning his radio career in 1990, presenting and reporting for the Radio 5 magazine show The Mix.

== Personal life ==
Wilson was born in London in 1965. He attended Chancellor's School in Hertfordshire and gained a BA (Hons) in English and Media awarded by the University of Southampton in 1988. John is the son of former Arsenal goalkeeper and television sports presenter Bob Wilson.

Wilson is a member of a band called Centrist Dad. Wilson, who plays the bass guitar, is accompanied by Robert Peston, on vocals, and Ed Balls, on drums.
