= The Singles Collection (Spandau Ballet album) =

Greatest hits album by Spandau Ballet
- Released: 4 November 1985
- Recorded: 1980–1984
- Genre: Pop
- Length: 1:00:05 (LP/CD) 1:39:55 (2×LP)
- Label: Chrysalis
- Producers: Richard James Burgess; Trevor Horn; Tony Swain; Steve Jolley; Spandau Ballet

Spandau Ballet chronology
Parade (1984)	The Singles Collection (1985)	The Twelve Inch Mixes (1986)

The Singles Collection is a greatest hits album by the English pop band Spandau Ballet, released on 4 November 1985 by Chrysalis Records. The album peaked at number three on the UK Albums Chart and was certified double platinum by the British Phonographic Industry (BPI) within six weeks of release. It is the band's best-selling album in the United Kingdom, though despite its success, the album was released without the band's approval as they were leaving Chrysalis Records and signed to CBS Records for their next album.

== Background ==
Spandau Ballet had their first pop hit in the US in 1983 when their number 1 UK single "True" reached number 4 on Billboard magazine's Hot 100. Their next single, "Gold", went to number 2 in the UK and made the top ten in several other countries (Note: "Gold" reached number 2 in the Netherlands, number 3 in Belgium, number 4 in Ireland and Spain, number 8 in New Zealand and number 9 in Australia.) but only reached number 29 in the US. The band's guitarist/songwriter Gary Kemp began to suspect that the American office of Chrysalis Records was neglecting them, and the fact that their next US single, number 12 UK hit "Communication", stalled at 59 on the Hot 100 was further proof. (Note: "America was not going to plan. 'Gold' had been a hit, although not as big as 'True', but 'Communication' and 'Only When You Leave' had fallen away early ... While we were selling large amounts in Europe and the rest of the world, Chrysalis America were not pulling their weight.") "Only When You Leave", the first single from their next album, Parade, went to number 3 in the UK and also made the top ten in several other countries (Note: "Only When You Leave" reached number 2 in Ireland and the Netherlands, number 3 in Greece, number 4 in Spain, number 5 in Belgium, number 8 in Norway and number 10 in New Zealand,) but only managed a number 34 showing in the US.

Kemp felt certain the disappointing US numbers were because Chrysalis founders Chris Wright and Terry Ellis had an interpersonal conflict that was distracting them from promotional efforts. (Note: "The spat between Wright and Ellis, the two company owners, was worsening and it seemed to us we were being affected like the children of a disintegrating marriage.") Wright refused to license the band to a bigger label in the US, so they first sought legal advice to get out of their contract. They eventually sued Chrysalis for breach of contract in 1985 because they felt they had "not received the 'support and promotion' stipulated" therein. Chrysalis released The Singles Collection during the dispute but only notified them of the album a week before it was in stores. An out-of-court settlement was reached in which Chrysalis was given access to their back catalog but had no rights to any new recordings.

== Release and commercial performance ==
The Singles Collection was released on 4 November 1985 and entered the UK Albums Chart on 16 November to begin a 54-week run, during which time it peaked at number 3. It reached double platinum certification from the British Phonographic Industry on 16 December of that year for reaching the 600,000 units of shipment threshold. It got as high as number 2 in New Zealand, number 3 in Australia, number 9 in Spain, number 17 in the Netherlands and number 32 on the European Albums chart.

== Critical reception ==
Professional ratings
Review scores
Source	Rating
AllMusic	4/5 stars
Record Mirror	2.5/5 stars
The Rolling Stone Album Guide	2.5/5 stars
Smash Hits	8/10 stars

The Singles Collection had mostly negative reviews from music magazines upon its release, the one exception being Smash Hits, whose William White described it as a "plainly-packaged compilation" that gave "everyone an opportunity to appreciate Gary's consistently developing talent as a songwriter." Number One's critic Max Bell replaced the star-rating system in its 16 November 1985 issue with the categories "Buy It", "Hear It" and "Forget It", the last of which he used to summarize his thoughts on the compilation. Nancy Culp of Record Mirror was not as terse in her review:

From the gauche plinkety-plod of "To Cut a Long Story Short" to the Mecca ballroom tack of "Gold", this album shows just how much money you can get for a bit of old rope. There is, however, a diamond in the dustbin—"Chant No. 1 (I Don't Need This Pressure On)". It still manages to evoke the essence of the club scene circa 1981. It's the closest to the edge they ever got and still steams and crackles like sweat hitting a hotplate. "If only" could be the motto of this band. If only the singer had tried less to be a Las Vegas trouser splitter. If only the bad had not knocked so many rough edges off that they had skid marks on their G majors. In 1981 Spandau looked set to scale the heights—but tastefully. Come 1985 the money spoke louder than their hearts.

Retrospective reviews were more complimentary. Dave Thompson of AllMusic described it as "excellent". Paul Evans wrote a brief summary review of most of the Spandau Ballet album discography in The Rolling Stone Album Guide and gave The Singles Collection two-and-a-half stars out of five while describing it as "an all right greatest hits package ".

== Track listing ==
All tracks are written by Gary Kemp and taken from the 7" single recordings.

Side one
No.	Title	Original album	Length
1.	"Gold"	True (1983)	3:54
2.	"Lifeline"	True (1983)	3:21
3.	"Round and Round"	Parade (1984)	4:34
4.	"Only When You Leave"	Parade (1984)	4:48
5.	"Instinction" (*)	Diamond (1982)	3:35
6.	"Highly Strung" (**)	Parade (1984)	4:10
7.	"True"	True (1983)	5:36
Total length:			29:58

Side two
No.	Title	Original album	Length
1.	"Communication"	True (1983)	3:25
2.	"I'll Fly for You"	Parade (1984)	5:10
3.	"To Cut a Long Story Short" (**)	Journeys to Glory (1981)	3:20
4.	"Chant No. 1 (I Don't Need This Pressure On)" (**)	Diamond (1982)	4:06
5.	"She Loved Like Diamond" (**)	Diamond (1982)	2:55
6.	"Paint Me Down" (**)	Diamond (1982)	3:43
7.	"The Freeze"	Journeys to Glory (1981)	3:30
8.	"Muscle Bound"	Journeys to Glory (1981)	3:58
Total length:			30:07

*Same version also released on 12" single
**Same version also released on original album

=== The 12″ Collection ===
Initial copies of the vinyl album included a limited-edition bonus disc titled The 12" Collection. All tracks were taken from the 12" single recordings, except the "Chant No. 1" Remix, which was released with the Diamond 12" box set in 1982.

Side one
No.	Title	Length
1.	"To Cut a Long Story Short"	6:30
2.	"Chant No. 1" (Remix)	8:03
3.	"Glow"	8:10
Total length:		22:43

Side two
No.	Title	Length
1.	"Communication" (Club Mix)	4:28
2.	"Gold" (Extended Version)	7:12
3.	"Highly Re-Strung"	5:27
Total length:		17:07

== Charts ==
=== Weekly charts ===
Weekly chart performance for The Singles Collection
Chart (1985–1986)	Peak position
Australian Albums (Kent Music Report)	3
Dutch Albums (Album Top 100)	17
European Albums (Music & Media)	32
New Zealand Albums (RMNZ)	2
Spain (AFYVE)	9
UK Albums (Official Charts)	3

=== Year-end charts ===
1985 year-end chart performance for The Singles Collection
Chart (1985)	Position
UK Albums (Gallup)	22

1986 year-end chart performance for The Singles Collection
Chart (1986)	Position
Australian Albums (Kent Music Report)	34
New Zealand Albums (RMNZ)	41
UK Albums (Gallup)	77

== Certifications ==
Certifications for The Singles Collection
Region	Certification	Certified units/sales
New Zealand (RMNZ)	Platinum	15,000^{^}
United Kingdom (BPI)	2× Platinum	600,000^{^}
^{^} Shipments figures based on certification alone.

== Bibliography ==
- Hadley, Tony (2004). To Cut a Long Story Short. Sidgwick & Jackson. ISBN 978-0-283-07386-1.
- Kent, David (1993). Australian Chart Book 1970–1992 (illustrated ed.). St Ives, N.S.W.: Australian Chart Book. ISBN 0-646-11917-6.
- Kemp, Gary (2009). I Know This Much: From Soho to Spandau. London: Fourth Estate. ISBN 978-0-00-732330-2.
