= The Twelve Inch Mixes =

Compilation album by Spandau Ballet
- Released: 30 June 1986
- Recorded: 1980–1984
- Genre: New wave
- Length: 1:29:23 (2×LP version); 1:13:15 (European CD version); 1:25:15 (Japanese 2×CD version)
- Label: Chrysalis
- Producer: Richard James Burgess; Trevor Horn; Tony Swain; Steve Jolley; Spandau Ballet

Spandau Ballet chronology
| The Singles Collection (1985) | The Twelve Inch Mixes (1986) | Through the Barricades (1986) |

The Twelve Inch Mixes is a compilation album by Spandau Ballet. It was released on 30 June 1986 by Chrysalis Records. The collection is composed of the band's 12" single recordings released between 1980 and 1984, some of which were ballads that were not remixed from their original studio album presentation.

== Commercial performance ==
The Twelve Inch Mixes reached number 98 in Australia.

== Critical reception ==
Professional ratings
Review scores
| Source | Rating |
|---|---|
| AllMusic | 4/5 stars |

Dave Thompson of AllMusic described the compilation as "immensely enjoyable". He wrote, "The album, like the band, is at its best in the early years, while Spandau still took their status as Britain's finest club funk band seriously," and that "the balladic successes of 'Gold', 'True', and 'Only When You Leave' do much to detract from the sheer genius of those early hits, although their own brilliance cannot be disavowed."

== Track listing ==
=== Double LP ===
All tracks are written by Gary Kemp and taken from the 12" single recordings.

Side one
| No. | Title | Original album | Length |
|---|---|---|---|
| 1. | "Gold" (Extended Version) | True (1983) | 7:12 |
| 2. | "Lifeline" (12" Version) | True (1983) | 5:17 |
| 3. | "Round and Round" (Album & 12" Version) | Parade (1984) | 5:30 |
| 4. | "Only When You Leave" (Extended Mix) | Parade (1984) | 6:45 |
| Total length: | | | 24:44 |

Side two
| No. | Title | Original album | Length |
|---|---|---|---|
| 1. | "Instinction" (7- & 12" Version) | Diamond (1982) | 3:36 |
| 2. | "Highly Re-Strung" (12" Version) | Parade (1984) | 5:27 |
| 3. | "True" (Album & 12" Version) | True (1983) | 6:28 |
| 4. | "Communication" (Club Mix) | True (1983) | 4:28 |
| Total length: | | | 19:59 |

Side three
| No. | Title | Original album | Length |
|---|---|---|---|
| 1. | "I'll Fly for You" (Glide Mix) | Parade (1984) | 7:13 |
| 2. | "To Cut a Long Story Short" (12" Version) | Journeys to Glory (1981) | 6:30 |
| 3. | "Chant No. 1 (I Don't Need This Pressure On)" (Diamond Box Set Version) | Diamond (1982) | 8:30 |
| 4. | "She Loved Like Diamond" (12" Version) | Diamond (1982) | 3:37 |
| Total length: | | | 25:50 |

Side four
| No. | Title | Original album | Length |
|---|---|---|---|
| 1. | "Paint Me Down" (12" Version) | Diamond (1982) | 7:06 |
| 2. | "The Freeze" (Special Mix) | Journeys to Glory (1981) | 6:30 |
| 3. | "Muscle Bound" (Remix) | Journeys to Glory (1981) | 4:54 |
| Total length: | | | 18:50 |

=== European CD ===
| No. | Title | Length |
|---|---|---|
| 1. | "Gold" (Extended Version) | 7:20 |
| 2. | "Lifeline" (12" Version) | 5:20 |
| 3. | "Round and Round" (Album & 12" Version) | 5:33 |
| 4. | "Only When You Leave" (Edited Extended Mix) | 6:22 |
| 5. | "Instinction" (7- & 12" Version) | 3:37 |
| 6. | "Highly Re-Strung" (12" Version) | 5:30 |
| 7. | "True" (Edited Album & 12" Version) | 6:08 |
| 8. | "Communication" (Club Mix) | 4:30 |
| 9. | "I'll Fly for You" (Album Version) | 5:37 |
| 10. | "To Cut a Long Story Short" (12" Version) | 6:04 |
| 11. | "Chant No. 1 (I Don't Need This Pressure On)" (Edited 12" Version) | 5:48 |
| 12. | "The Freeze" (Special Mix) | 6:33 |
| 13. | "Muscle Bound" (Remix) | 4:53 |
| Total length: | | 1:13:15 |

=== Japanese 2CD ===
Disc one
| No. | Title | Length |
|---|---|---|
| 1. | "Gold" (Extended Version) | 7:17 |
| 2. | "Lifeline" (12" Version) | 5:20 |
| 3. | "Round and Round" (Album & 12" Version) | 5:34 |
| 4. | "Only When You Leave" (Extended Mix) | 6:48 |
| 5. | "Instinction" (7- & 12" Version) | 3:37 |
| 6. | "Highly Re-Strung" (12" Version) | 5:31 |
| 7. | "True" (Album & 12" Version) | 6:31 |
| 8. | "Communication" (Club Mix) | 4:27 |
| Total length: | | 45:05 |

Disc two
| No. | Title | Length |
|---|---|---|
| 1. | "I'll Fly for You" (Album Version) | 5:38 |
| 2. | "To Cut a Long Story Short" (12" Version) | 6:31 |
| 3. | "Chant No. 1 (I Don't Need This Pressure On)" (Edited 12" Version) | 5:48 |
| 4. | "She Loved Like Diamond" (12" Version) | 3:40 |
| 5. | "Paint Me Down" (12" Version) | 7:06 |
| 6. | "The Freeze" (Special Mix) | 6:33 |
| 7. | "Muscle Bound" (Remix) | 4:54 |
| Total length: | | 40:10 |

== Charts ==
| Chart (1987) | Peak position |
|---|---|
| Australia (Kent Music Report) | 98 |
