= Only When You Leave =

1984 single by Spandau Ballet

Single by Spandau Ballet

from the album Parade
- B-side: "Paint Me Down" (live)
- Released: 28 May 1984
- Recorded: Spring 1984
- Genre: Pop; soul
- Length: 4:48 (single version); 5:12 (album version); 6:45 (extended version); 6:22 (The Twelve Inch Mixes CD version); 4:35 (music video version)
- Label: Chrysalis; Reformation
- Songwriter: Gary Kemp
- Producers: Tony Swain; Steve Jolley; Spandau Ballet

Spandau Ballet singles chronology
"Pleasure" (1983)	"Only When You Leave" (1984)	"I'll Fly for You" (1984)

"Only When You Leave" is a song by the English new wave band Spandau Ballet, released as the first single from their fourth album Parade. It peaked at number 3 on the UK Singles Chart and made the top 10 in several other countries but only reached number 34 in the US, where it was their last song to appear on the Billboard Hot 100. Most critics were impressed with Tony Hadley's vocals and enjoyed the song. The music video used its theme of revenge as a way of paying tribute to the late film director Alfred Hitchcock.

== Background ==
Spandau Ballet had their greatest success to date with their 1983 album True, which spent a week at number 1 on the UK Albums Chart and yielded four hit songs, including the title track, which became their first number 1 UK single. The band decided to continue working with their True co-producers, Tony Swain and Steve Jolley, on their next album, Parade, which was recorded in Munich. The band's guitarist/songwriter Gary Kemp described "Only When You Leave", the first single from the new album, as "a good mediator between True and Parade. It's got quite a bare arrangement, but it's still melodic, still soulful."

== Music video ==
In his book Film and Television In-Jokes, Bill van Heerden notes, "A Hitchcock look-alike crosses the stage in front of [the band] carrying a bass fiddle (as Hitchcock did in Strangers on a Train, 1951)."

Although Kemp normally would come up with whatever concept or storyline was presented in Spandau Ballet videos, his focus on the new album meant handing over control of "Only When You Leave" to the director. (Note: "Gary plays a large part in Spandau Ballet videos, thinking up the concept and storyline directly from his lyrics, but he's handed over control of 'Only When You Leave' to an outside director because of the band's hectic schedule at present, as he explains. "We only finished the new album a couple of days ago, so it's all been a matter of finding the time.") Lead singer Tony Hadley summarized "Only When You Leave" as a song about "a lover's revenge" in explaining director Simon Milne's decision that the music video would interweave surreal vignettes saluting Alfred Hitchcock films with scenes of the band performing, noting that the late director's films were "all about romance, murder and revenge". (Note: "Basically, it's a performance video," says Tone, "director Simon Milne … added some surreal images, which are tributes to Alfred Hitchcock's films. We thought it was appropriate because his films are all about romance, murder and revenge, and that's what the song is all about – a lover's revenge.") Kemp explained that the vignettes, some of which borrow elements from movies like Strangers on a Train, are not meant to present an entire story, saying that "you just give people the general idea and they work it out for themselves."

The entire video was filmed on a Battersea sound stage with minimal set decoration. A set of bleachers functions as a stage for some of the performance shots of the band, seating for an audience at an unseen tennis match, and stairs for various other scenes, one of which shows a young boy seated on them and dressed in white as he plays with a harlequin doll. (Note: Spandau Ballet cover artist David Band dressed as a harlequin for the photo portion of the Parade album cover and incorporated harlequin sketches into the sleeve and label design as a replacement for the dove used for the True album. (Note: "At the moment I'm trying to replace the dove symbol from True. That's what the harlequin figure on the record is all about. I was a bit suspicious, though, when Martin (Kemp) got me dressed up in a harlequin outfit for the album sleeve parade…")) A man smoking a cigar steps on the doll on his way up the stairs, and the boy's clothing changes at that moment from white to a dark shade of pink, a colour that predominates throughout. Dark pink fabric is the sole backdrop for all of the scenes, and the actress playing Hadley's lover is primarily wearing dark pink clothing. At one point, however, she is shown alongside a matching 1949 MG, and both the colour of the car and her clothing change from pink to white when Hadley touches her shoulder. Their relationship is first presented as she steps backward while Hadley falls to the floor as if she has just shot him. The same scenario is presented in reverse at the end of the video; he steps back as she falls to the floor. A scene at the start of the bridge to the song presents what looks to be her dead body being discovered by the tennis match audience members in the bleachers just moments after she and Hadley were in conversation.

"Only When You Leave" was listed on MTV's reports to Billboard indicating what videos were in rotation on the cable network, making its first appearance there in the 14 July 1984 issue, which indicated that it had been added to their playlist as of 3 July.

== Release and commercial performance ==
Recorded in spring 1984, "Only When You Leave" was released as a 7-inch single in the UK on 28 May of that year and peaked at number 3 there. It also reached number 2 in Ireland and the Netherlands, number 3 in Greece, number 4 in Spain, number 5 in Belgium, number 8 in Norway, number 10 in New Zealand, and number 34 in the US on Billboard magazine's Hot 100, making it their last chart entry there. Kemp was unhappy with the lower peak positions that their recent singles had attained stateside, which resulted in their move from Chrysalis to CBS Records in 1986.

== Critical reception ==
Spandau Ballet - "Only When You Leave"
Critic Neil Tennant appreciated Hadley's "warm, restrained performance" and "Gary Kemp's talents as a scratchy rhythm guitarist".

At the time of its release, most critics applauded "Only When You Leave" and appreciated Hadley's vocals. Paul Bursche of Number One magazine felt he was "emerging as a super crooner" and described the song as "superb pop". In their capsule review, the editors of Billboard magazine wrote, "Elegance, sophistication, panache and a dance beat to boot; unwonted restraint from singer Tony Hadley." Neil Tennant of Smash Hits concurred that Hadley "gives a warm, restrained performance on this funky and rockin' number which also displays Gary Kemp's talents as a scratchy rhythm guitarist." When his colleague Ian Birch reviewed Parade upon its release, he was effusive, opining that the song was "almost too good a start to the LP. Tony Hadley's vocals are more confident than ever; the production … is crisp and succulent at the same time; and the song itself is Gary Kemp's finest to date." Conversely, however, Graham K. of Record Mirror thought it was "their weakest offering for ages" and dismissed it as "a grandiose, empty re-write of 'Foundation'." In a negative review of Parade's fourth single, "Round and Round", Phil McNeill of Number One admitted, "The Spands did achieve a kind of pleasant perfection on the wonderful 'Only When You Leave'."

In retrospective reviews, Ian Gittins described the song in The Guardian as typical of the band's move into "slick, chart-friendly shoulder-heaving soul". Peter Larsen wrote for the Orange County Register that it mines "a vein of soulfulness tinged with nostalgia and romance".

== Formats and track listings ==
- 7-inch single
1. "Only When You Leave" – 4:48
2. "Paint Me Down" (live) – 4:39
- 12-inch single
1. "Only When You Leave" (extended mix) –6:45
2. "Only When You Leave" –4:48
3. "Paint Me Down" (live) – 4:39

== Personnel ==
Credits adapted from the liner notes for Parade:

Spandau Ballet

- Tony Hadley – lead vocals
- Gary Kemp – guitar and backing vocals
- Martin Kemp – bass
- Steve Norman – saxophone and percussion
- John Keeble – drums

Additional musician

- Jess Bailey – keyboards

Production

- Tony Swain – producer, engineer
- Steve Jolley – producer
- Spandau Ballet – producers
- Richard Lengyel – engineering assistance
- Pete Hillier – equipment
- Nick Sibley – equipment
- David Band – illustration
- Mixed at Musicland Studios (Munich)

== Charts ==
=== Weekly charts ===
Weekly chart performance for "Only When You Leave"
Chart (1984)	Peak position
Australia (Kent Music Report)	12
Belgium (Ultratop 50 Flanders)	5
Canada Top Singles (RPM)	23
Europe (European Top 100 Singles)	16
Greece (IFPI)	3
Ireland (IRMA)	2
Luxembourg (Radio Luxembourg)	3
Netherlands (Dutch Top 40)	2
Netherlands (Single Top 100)	3
New Zealand (Recorded Music NZ)	10
Norway (VG-lista)	8
Quebec (ADISQ)	24
Spain (AFYVE)	4
Switzerland (Schweizer Hitparade)	20
UK Singles (Official Charts)	3
US Billboard Hot 100	34
US Adult Contemporary (Billboard)	36
US Mainstream Rock (Billboard)	40
US Cash Box Top 100 Singles	32
West Germany (GfK)	26
Zimbabwe (ZIMA)	18

=== Year-end charts ===
Year-end chart performance for "Only When You Leave"
Chart (1984)	Position
Australia (Kent Music Report)	89
Belgium (Ultratop 50 Flanders)	51
Netherlands (Dutch Top 40)	10
Netherlands (Single Top 100)	32
UK Singles (Gallup)	88

== Bibliography ==
- Hadley, Tony (2004). To Cut a Long Story Short. London: Sidgwick & Jackson. ISBN 978-0-283-07386-1.
- Kemp, Gary (2009). I Know This Much: From Soho to Spandau. London: Fourth Estate. ISBN 978-0-00-732330-2.
