= Highly Strung (song) =

Single by Spandau Ballet

from the album Parade
- B-side: "Version" version (dub mix)
- Released: 8 October 1984
- Recorded: Spring 1984
- Genre: Pop
- Length: 4:10 (single/album/video version); 4:05 ("Version" version (dub mix)); 5:27 ("Highly Re-strung" 12" version); 5:17 (extended version)
- Label: Chrysalis; Reformation
- Songwriter: Gary Kemp
- Producers: Tony Swain; Steve Jolley; Spandau Ballet

Spandau Ballet singles chronology
"I'll Fly for You" (1984)	"Highly Strung" (1984)	"Round and Round" (1984)

"Highly Strung" is a song by the English new wave band Spandau Ballet, released as the third single from the 1984 album Parade. In their native UK, the song reached number 15 on the UK Singles Chart, and critics had a variety of responses to it. The music video used the population density of Hong Kong to demonstrate the song's emotional themes.

== Background, release and commercial performance ==
When Spandau Ballet guitarist/songwriter Gary Kemp was working on their first single "To Cut a Long Story Short" with producer Richard James Burgess and was wanting to remix that song for the B-side of the 7-inch single, he had in mind the reggae dubs and remixes done by King Tubby and Lee "Scratch" Perry dating back to the sixties. (Note: "Most 45 rpm singles had another song on side two. Gary thought we might try a remix for the flipside. The track had strong up-tempo dance elements. We bounced influences and preferences around and Gary reflected on the Jamaican dub reggae mixes: the pioneering sixties and seventies work of King Tubby and Lee 'Scratch' Perry.") They thought of the remix for that song as having been inspired by those recordings rather than as an attempt at performing an all-out reggae version of the song, and they borrowed the terminology from those record labels by using the subtitle "Version", (Note: "There was no attempt to emulate the reggae forefathers, but we tipped our hat to their inspiration by subtitling the B side 'Version'.") which they also did for the B-side of the 7-inch single of "Highly Strung". Kemp was quoted as saying that "Highly Strung" would be reminiscent of their 1981 hit "Chant No. 1 (I Don't Need This Pressure On)".

Recorded in spring 1984, "Highly Strung" was released in the UK on 8 October of that year and peaked at number 15 there. It also reached number 18 in Ireland, number 36 in the Netherlands, number 46 in New Zealand and number 83 in Australia.

== Critical reception ==
Mike Read of Smash Hits wrote, "The winning combination of Gary Kemp's songs and Tony Hadley's voice contrives unchecked, although it has neither the aggression of 'Musclebound' nor the sensitivity of 'True'. 'Highly Strung' will be much played, highly vaunted and a sizeable hit." Number One's Paul Simper was not impressed:

Gary Kemp has been quoted as saying that "Highly Strung" would mark a return to the old "Chant"-styled Spandau. But though the guitar may be harder, the story's a million miles from that soul boy romanticism. "Highly strung—she's undone" sounds like one of those old Bob Geldof tales—snatched from the headlines but barely considered. After Spandau's last two sophisticated offerings, this sees them marking time. Surely the anthemic "With the Pride" would have been a bolder choice?

Eleanor Levy of Record Mirror disagreed, describing "Highly Strung" as "probably the best track off the abysmal Parade album."

== Music video ==
An article in Billboard magazine at the time of the song's UK release reported the band was "believed to be the first major pop act to make a high-budget promotional music video on location in Hong Kong." Spandau saxophonist Steve Norman told Smash Hits, "We don't just use these locations for the sake of it… 'Highly Strung' is about pressure and claustrophobia—there are more people per square inch in Hong Kong than anywhere in the world." The band was also interested in filming in mainland China but applied too late to get permission. Billboard explained, "The summit talks about the eventual handing over of Hong Kong to the Chinese in 1997 helped fuel enthusiasm for making the video in this territory."

The video shows the band and a local model, played by Sally Kwok, involved in a series of photo shoots that leave her short-tempered and unwilling to be photographed elsewhere. The last scene shows her riding a bike along a country road and approaching a gated chain-link fence with barbed wire, which was supposed to convey her escape to China to find relief. (Note: "In the end it shows us flying off in a helicopter, but a model who was in our video has to make it to China to escape the pressure. Well, that's the idea, anyway.")

When the band returned to Hong Kong during their 2015 world tour, Richard Lord of the South China Morning Post described the video as "a retrospectively hilarious collection of Sino-clichés."

== Track listing ==
- 7-inch single

A. "Highly Strung" – 4:10
B. "Highly Strung" Version – 4:05

- 12-inch single

A. "Highly Re-strung" – 5:27
B. "Highly Strung" (Extended Version) – 5:17

== Personnel ==
Credits adapted from the liner notes for Parade:

Spandau Ballet

- Tony Hadley – lead vocals
- Gary Kemp – guitar and backing vocals
- Martin Kemp – bass
- Steve Norman – saxophone and percussion
- John Keeble – drums

Additional musician

- Jess Bailey – keyboards

Production

- Tony Swain – producer, engineer
- Steve Jolley – producer
- Spandau Ballet – producers
- Richard Lengyel – engineering assistance
- Pete Hillier – equipment
- Nick Sibley – equipment
- David Band – illustration
- Mixed at Musicland Studios (Munich)

== Charts ==
Chart performance for "Highly Strung"
Chart (1984–1985)	Peak position
Australia (Kent Music Report)	83
Europe (European Top 100 Singles)	44
Ireland (IRMA)	18
Luxembourg (Radio Luxembourg)	10
Netherlands (Dutch Top 40)	32
Netherlands (Single Top 100)	36
New Zealand (Recorded Music NZ)	46
UK Singles (OCC)	15
