= Parade (Spandau Ballet album) =

Studio album by Spandau Ballet
- Released: 25 June 1984
- Recorded: Spring 1984
- Studios: Musicland (Munich, West Germany); Union (Munich, West Germany)
- Length: 40:09
- Label: Chrysalis
- Producers: Tony Swain; Steve Jolley; Spandau Ballet

Spandau Ballet chronology
True (1983)	Parade (1984)	The Singles Collection (1985)

Singles from Parade
- 1. "Only When You Leave" Released: 28 May 1984; 2. "I'll Fly for You" Released: 13 August 1984; 3. "Highly Strung" Released: 8 October 1984; 4. "Round and Round" Released: 26 November 1984

Parade is the fourth studio album by the English new wave band Spandau Ballet, released on 25 June 1984 by Chrysalis Records. The band wanted the album to sound more like how they played together live, and their guitarist/songwriter Gary Kemp came up with material that he felt would be more appropriate for the arenas in which they performed now since they were attracting larger audiences. Because they would be parading themselves around the world as part of the album's corresponding tour, he hit upon the idea of a parade as the theme of the album and included an international cast of characters taking part in a parade on the album cover.

The album peaked at number two in the UK in its first week of release and achieved platinum certification for sales of 300,000 units there. Critics, however, mostly found it to be a bland retread of their previous album, True. The first of four top-20 singles from Parade, "Only When You Leave", received the most praise from them and was the most successful, reaching number 3 in the UK and the top ten in several other countries, but its lacklustre chart performance in the US caused a rift between the band and their record company. They moved to a new label and hired new producers for their next studio album, Through the Barricades, which was another attempt at the arena rock sound that they were unable to achieve on Parade.

== Background and development ==
Spandau Ballet's 1983 album True spent a week at number one on the UK Albums Chart and spawned four hit songs, including the title track, which became their first number one UK single. As they toured with that album, they noticed that they were playing together better as a band and wanted that chemistry to show on their next album. Their guitarist/songwriter Gary Kemp could hear a dramatic difference between the sound of the True album and how that music changed in their live performances and wanted their next album to be closer to the style of live performing. (Note: "While we were on tour last year we really gelled together as a unit,… and we wanted to get some of that feeling into this LP. True was very different live from on record. With this LP we didn't want to have such a large gap.") They flew their True co-producers Tony Swain and Steve Jolley to New York for their last show on the tour for that album so that the duo could hear the new chemistry they were enjoying, and Swain and Jolley got a sense of what they had in mind for the next project. (Note: "We flew the pair of them out to New York for our last gig so that they could hear how we sounded now, which was the sound we wanted for the new album, and they agreed.")

To achieve the louder sound of their live performances on the next album, Kemp wanted to shift his writing so that the songs were geared more toward arenas. (Note: "Since writing the last album, we had become a live act; in fact, we were all beginning to prefer this louder version of ourselves. Where with the True album I'd only been concerned with the sound of the record, now the songs would be written for the stage, and this time those stages would be arenas.") At the same time, he wanted to continue writing songs of a personal nature as he did for True instead of dance music as he did for their previous two albums. (Note: "We've got away from dancing. I just wasn't interested in songs based around a 4/4 drum beat. I just wanted to have complete freedom and write the sort of songs I want. Plus, I'd never put any of my emotions in my songs. Nothing before 'True' contained any emotion from me as a songwriter. The kind of songs we were doing didn't demand it. They were much more channeled to making dance music. I just wanted to sit down and write a song that is me—no matter what it sounds like and what market it appeals to. That was the True LP. That's what we've continued on Parade.") He told Record Mirror, "I just felt with 'True' I entered a style of writing that the LP hadn't quite fulfilled. I felt I wanted to expand it a bit more and take it where it should be." He also said in 1984 that he would continue to write for the larger audience Spandau Ballet had acquired with "True" but that they would not be making albums that sounded like the last just because it did well. (Note: "If I can, I'll be writing songs that appeal to that amount of people. Doesn't mean to say I'm going to stick to an equation now, 'cause we never have. The next album won't sound like True just because True sold so well.") But, similar to how he had developed writer's block in 1981 after "Chant No. 1 (I Don't Need This Pressure On)" became their highest-charting single, having a UK number one put pressure on Kemp to churn out more chart-topping hits and left him feeling that the band would always judge his future output against "True". (Note: "With 'True' I'd created my own competition, setting a personal benchmark almost impossible to reach again. A hit song of that nature takes on a legend of its own: people's lives become personally involved in it; they fall in love and get married to it; and a hungry band wants more of it. That kind of iconic status needs time. But whatever I brought to the rehearsal table would only be judged by 'True'.")

In his autobiography I Know This Much: From Soho to Spandau, Kemp confessed, "The whole process of writing the next Spandau album was starting to depress me and I found numerous distractions in order to avoid it." Bandmate Steve Norman had given him a book about Picasso that discussed his work designing backdrops for a ballet titled Parade, and he contacted David Band, who created the artwork for the True album and singles and was a Picasso fan. Band mentioned that David Hockney had recently painted the backdrops for a new version of the Parade ballet, which inspired Kemp: "I suddenly saw the album as a touring show. A musical pageant that would take us around the world. Parade would be our title and concept for both record and tour."

== Recording ==
I'm happier with Parade and songs like "With the Pride" than True.

— Gary Kemp

Once Kemp had completed writing the songs, the band rehearsed for two months in a Shepherd's Bush studio, working on the arrangements and learning "each other's parts backwards". They recognised the value in having recorded True away from London, however, and chose to record Parade at Musicland Studios in Munich because they felt an urban setting would be more appropriate than Compass Point Studios in the Bahamas, where they had recorded the previous album. Musicland also appealed to them because of work done there by Led Zeppelin and Queen and the quality of the equipment. (Note: "And why did they choose to record in Munich? 'Because the outboards are really good,' says John Keeble. The, er… what? 'The sound processing equipment,' explains Steve [Norman].") (Note: "Musicland Studios … was considered one of the best-equipped studios in Europe.") As with True, Spandau Ballet are credited alongside Swain and Jolley for producing the album, which was recorded in spring 1984. Jolley recorded lead singer Tony Hadley's vocals across town at Union Studios, which Kemp felt "would at least stop me fretting and driving Tony insane over a particular nuance that he might give to the melody." He thought this album had a "more guitar-orientated sound" and admitted to Smash Hits, "I think it's the first time an album has sounded like Spandau Ballet."

== Cover art ==
Kemp wanted to put more emphasis on the record sleeve for Parade than they had on past releases because he felt that the industry had shifted its focus to promoting albums through music videos and had forgotten the importance of designing the album jacket. (Note: "I decided it was time to get back into thinking about record sleeves again because people have been concentrating on videos so much that sleeves have become just a few dots and graphics. I remember when I was a kid, sleeves were really important to me, so the sleeve for Parade is pretty extravagant. We spent a lot of time on it.") (Note: "With Parade I wanted to return to making the record sleeve important. So much has been done with videos, while the sleeve has just been passed over. What with all the 12-inches that come out as well as genuine LPs, the sleeves have become so commonplace as to be almost disposable. But the record sleeve's an important part of the album. Unlike a promotional video, it's something permanent, something you can keep.") They had an idea to pay homage to the Beatles's Sgt. Pepper album cover with famous people from the '80s, but Kemp explained to Number One magazine that "it was too short notice to get it together. Also it could have looked a bit too kitsch." Instead he consulted with Band, who painted a banner of the profile of a man standing and pointing straight ahead with one hand while the other provides a visor for his eyes. The man represented their experience during the True tour of moving forward while being blinded by a shower of accolades. (Note: "On the album sleeve there's the giant figure of a man standing in front of a building. He's pointing forward with one hand while the other is shielding his eyes from the sun. That was what it was like touring last year after the success of True. Every city we went to, we received accolades—which was great—but it was like having a light hanging above you, glowing the whole time.") The banner is prominently displayed on the album cover, where it hangs in front of an art deco building.

A diverse procession makes its way below the banner, on the street level, in keeping with the parade theme. The group of characters is led by the man with a megaphone who was featured on the cover of the album's first single, "Only When You Leave". He is followed by Carmen Miranda, Chinese dragons, American Revolutionary War soldiers, Mardi Gras revellers and several other characters portrayed by celebrities and friends and family members of the band. Future pop star Samantha Fox, television presenter and actress Sarah Greene and pop singer and actress Patsy Kensit appeared in majorette outfits. Blue Rondo singer Chris Sullivan portrayed a member of a New Orleans band. Number One journalist Paul Simper was recruited into dressing like Uncle Sam, and the fathers of Spandau Ballet—Stan Keeble, Pat Hadley, Tony Norman and Frank Kemp—carried a trade union banner. Band dressed for the cover photo as a harlequin, a character borrowed from Hockney's Parade that he used to decorate the album label and sleeve in the same way the dove was used for True.

== Release and commercial performance ==
Parade was released on 25 June 1984 and spent the first three of its 39 weeks on the UK Albums Chart in its peak position at number two. It reached number one in the Netherlands and Italy and also made the top ten in several other countries (Note: The album peaked at number four in Australia, number 7 in Germany and Norway, number 8 in New Zealand and number 9 in Sweden and Switzerland.) In the US it got as high as number 50 on Billboard magazine's Top LPs & Tapes chart and number 35 on its list of the country's most popular rock albums. The British Phonographic Industry issued platinum certification on 8 October 1984 after the album reached sales of 300,000 units.

== Critical reception ==
Professional ratings
Review scores
Source	Rating
AllMusic	2.5/5 stars
Number One	2/5 stars
Record Mirror	2/5 stars
Rolling Stone	2/5 stars
The Rolling Stone Album Guide	2/5 stars
Smash Hits	9/10 stars

Some of the North American trade magazines had complimentary reviews of Parade upon its release. The editors at RPM wrote, "A lean, instrumentally focused effort from Spandau," and were impressed by "Revenge for Love" and "Highly Strung". They concluded, "Good arrangements here with vocalist Tony Hadley responsible to a large degree for the band's distinctive sound." Cashbox concurred regarding Hadley, crediting his vocals for "the album's most powerful moments". They also noted,

Gary Kemp's guitar playing is more evident than in the past as on the integral fills in "Highly Strung" and the album's first single, "Only When You Leave". The sound is always crisp, and the arrangements are well-executed with the expert hand of Tony Swain behind the board.

Most of the music magazines, however, were critical of the album, the exception being Smash Hits, whose Ian Birch loved "Only When You Leave" and proclaimed, "The other seven songs grow more distinctive with every play. The melodies become sturdier, and you discover more and more smart extras, especially in the harmonies and the chorus lines." Paul Bursche of Number One had high expectations: "With 'Only When You Leave' being superb pop and Tony Hadley emerging as a super crooner, much should be expected from Parade." However, he felt that Kemp wanted to just repeat the success of their last album and concluded, "A winning formula is hard to give up. Spandau don't exactly take True the logical step further but instead shuffle sideways and manage to bring the parade to a glittering, schmaltzy dead halt."

Record Mirror's Betty Page felt the album's problem was likability: "It's far, far too nice. If y'all thought True showed dangerous signs of cabaret time, then this confirms all our worst fears, plunging in where even ABC feared to tread." She wrote, "It seems that the more capable they become as musicians, the lighter, tinnier and blander their songs become," and tried couching additional complaints by apologizing: "Sorry, but this is bland, tedious, softly accessible pop rock for housewives with no depth, no feel, no soul. Definitely no soul. If this is what they wanted to be all along, good for them. But such soft underbellies I can live without." Kurt Loder of Rolling Stone echoed her sentiments by insisting that the band's "English-soul-boy roots … have little to do with soul and everything to do with mid-Seventies dance-floor disco." He dismissed Kemp's songs as having "advanced melodic anemia", with Hadley "applying himself to the windy lyrics as though he thought they actually meant something." His distaste for the album culminated in his closing remark: "Even if Spandau Ballet were to become great at what it does, what it does would still be the most cretinous sort of Anglo-yuppie muzak imaginable."

Retrospective reviews were also critical. Paul Evans wrote a brief summary review of most of the Spandau Ballet album discography in The Rolling Stone Album Guide and gave Parade two stars out of five while dismissing it as "a lesser True". J. T. Griffith of AllMusic also compared it to their previous effort, writing that "it comes close to recapturing the stylish, white soul sound of the True LP. But nothing on the album comes close to the song 'True'." He also described the singles from Parade as "marginal at best".

== Singles and videos ==
"Only When You Leave" was released as a 7-inch single in the UK on 28 May 1984 and peaked at number three there. It also made the top ten in several other countries (Note: "Only When You Leave" reached number 2 in Ireland and the Netherlands, number 3 in Greece, number 4 in Spain, number 5 in Belgium, number 8 in Norway and number 10 in New Zealand,) but only got as high as number 34 in the US, where it became their last entry on the Billboard Hot 100. Critics described Hadley's vocals as "restrained" and "confident" and the song as "Gary Kemp's finest to date" and "pleasant perfection". The music video focused on the song's theme of revenge by presenting Hadley in a relationship with a femme fatale and included an Alfred Hitchcock look-alike as a way to salute the late film director. (Note: "A Hitchcock look-alike crosses the stage in front of [the band] carrying a bass fiddle (as Hitchcock did in Strangers on a Train, 1951).")

The second single from Parade, "I'll Fly for You", was released in the UK in August 1984 (Note: Record Mirror reported that the release date for "I'll Fly for You" would be 13 August 1984.) (Note: Smash Hits reported that the release date for "I'll Fly for You" would be 16 August 1984.) and reached number nine there but only made the top ten in two other countries. (Note: "I'll Fly for You" got as high as number 6 in Italy and number 10 in Ireland.) Reviews ran the gamut, with one critic pronouncing it "a winner", another calling the lyrics "uninspired", and yet another proclaiming it "[t]heir best single in ages" but finding the title and use of the saxophone "inappropriate and awkward". The music video was filmed in and around New Orleans in order to use the freedom and slavery of the Deep South as its theme. (Note: "We had a specific idea what we wanted to do involving the conflict between a desire for freedom and escape and the slavery and rough justice of the Deep South.")

"Highly Strung" was released in the UK on 8 October 1984 as the third single from the album and peaked at number 15 there. Comments again varied, with one critic naming it as "probably the best track off the abysmal Parade album" and another feeling that the band was "marking time". The music video was shot in Hong Kong because the band felt its population density matched the song's theme regarding emotional tension. The storyline involved the band's interaction with a local model who is short-tempered.

"Round and Round" was the album's fourth and final single and was released in the UK the following month, on 26 November. While it reached number 18 there, it charted higher elsewhere. (Note: "Round and Round" peaked at number 9 in Ireland, number 11 in Italy, number 14 in Spain, number 16 in Australia.) Although one reviewer found it "boring", others used descriptions such as "slick, polished and confident", "hugely poignant" and as having a "neat turn of melody". The music video was filmed in black and white and revolved around the presentation of a school play.

== Aftermath ==
Kemp was displeased with the peak chart positions in the US for "Only When You Leave" as well as "Communication", the last single released there from True, (Note: "'Communication' and 'Only When You Leave' had fallen away early.") and blamed the low numbers on a conflict between Chrysalis founders Chris Wright and Terry Ellis distracting them from promotional efforts. (Note: "The spat between Wright and Ellis, the two company owners, was worsening and it seemed to us we were being affected like the children of a disintegrating marriage.") Wright refused to licence the band to a bigger label in the US, so they sought legal advice to get out of their contract. The disappointing numbers in the US led them to sue Chrysalis for breach of contract in 1985 because they felt they had "not received the 'support and promotion' stipulated" therein. Later that year, Chrysalis released a greatest hits compilation of their material, The Singles Collection, but only notified them of the album a week before it was in stores. An out-of-court settlement was reached in which Chrysalis was given access to their back catalogue but had no rights to any new recordings.

Spandau Ballet moved on to CBS Records, which released their Parade follow-up, Through the Barricades, in 1986. The change in labels coincided with a decision to change producers; the band was still after "a bigger, meatier sound" suitable for arenas that they did not feel Swain and Jolley could provide. (Note: "We wanted to move on from Swain and Jolley, we wanted a bigger, meatier sound, one more suitable to the arenas we were now playing.") Upon the release of Through the Barricades, Kemp explained to Simper how Parade failed to achieve the live sound they wanted: "I think we were a bit afraid of making a big jump after True. The trouble was that Parade the record wasn't like we did it live. People went home and were disappointed by the record." He said, "We're a rock band now." Dan LeRoy of AllMusic described Through the Barricades as having "AOR aspirations".

In his 2004 autobiography To Cut a Long Story Short, Hadley wrote, "Parade is still my favourite Spandau album. At that point, the band was a fantastically stable ship."

== Track listing ==
All tracks are written by Gary Kemp.

No.	Title	Length
1.	"Only When You Leave"	5:12
2.	"Highly Strung"	4:11
3.	"I'll Fly for You"	5:37
4.	"Nature of the Beast"	5:15
5.	"Revenge for Love"	4:23
6.	"Always in the Back of My Mind"	4:30
7.	"With the Pride"	5:32
8.	"Round and Round"	5:30

== Personnel ==
Credits adapted from the liner notes for Parade:

=== Spandau Ballet ===
- Tony Hadley – lead and backing vocals
- Gary Kemp – guitars, backing vocals
- Martin Kemp – bass
- John Keeble – drums
- Steve Norman – percussion, saxophones

=== Additional musician ===
- Jess Bailey – keyboards

=== Technical ===
- Spandau Ballet – production
- Steve Jolley – production
- Tony Swain – production, engineering
- Richard Lengyel – engineering assistance
- David Band – design, illustration
- Gary Kemp – design
- Eric Watson – band photography
- John Shaw – sleeve photography

== Charts ==
=== Weekly charts ===
Weekly chart performance for Parade
Chart (1984–1985)	Peak position
Australian Albums (Kent Music Report)	4
Canada Top Albums/CDs (RPM)	21
Dutch Albums (Album Top 100)	1
European Albums (Music & Media)	6
German Albums (Offizielle Top 100)	7
Italian Albums (Musica e dischi)	1
Japanese Albums (Oricon)	33
New Zealand Albums (RMNZ)	8
Norwegian Albums (VG-lista)	7
Swedish Albums (Sverigetopplistan)	9
Swiss Albums (Schweizer Hitparade)	9
UK Albums (Official Charts)	2
US Billboard Rock Albums	35
US Billboard 200	50

=== Year-end charts ===
1984 year-end chart performance for Parade
Chart (1984)	Position
Australian Albums (Kent Music Report)	39
Dutch Albums (Album Top 100)	6
German Albums (Offizielle Top 100)	44
UK Albums (Gallup)	20

1985 year-end chart performance for Parade
Chart (1985)	Position
Australian Albums (Kent Music Report)	29
Dutch Albums (Album Top 100)	93

== Certifications ==
Certifications for Parade
Region	Certification	Certified units/sales
Netherlands (NVPI)	Platinum	100,000^{^}
New Zealand (RMNZ)	Gold	7,500^{^}
United Kingdom (BPI)	Platinum	300,000^{^}
^{^} Shipments figures based on certification alone.

== Bibliography ==
- Hadley, Tony (2004). To Cut a Long Story Short. Sidgwick & Jackson. ISBN 978-0-283-07386-1.
- Kemp, Gary (2009). I Know This Much: From Soho to Spandau. London: Fourth Estate. ISBN 978-0-00-732330-2.
- Kent, David (1993). Australian Chart Book 1970–1992 (illustrated ed.). St Ives, N.S.W.: Australian Chart Book. ISBN 0-646-11917-6.
