= Round and Round (Spandau Ballet song) =

Single by Spandau Ballet

from the album Parade
- B-side: "True" (live)
- Released: 26 November 1984
- Recorded: Spring 1984
- Genre: New wave
- Length: 4:34 (single version); 5:27 (album/12" version); 4:27 (video version)
- Label: Chrysalis; Reformation
- Songwriter: Gary Kemp
- Producers: Tony Swain; Steve Jolley; Spandau Ballet

Spandau Ballet singles chronology
"Highly Strung" (1984)	"Round and Round" (1984)	"Fight for Ourselves" (1986)

"Round and Round" is a song by the English new wave band Spandau Ballet, released as the fourth single from the 1984 album Parade. In their native UK, the song reached number 18 on the UK Singles Chart, and reviews were mixed.

== Release and commercial performance ==
Recorded in spring 1984, "Round and Round" was released in the UK on 26 November of that year and peaked at number 18 there. It also reached number 9 in Ireland, number 11 in Italy, number 14 in Spain, number 16 in Australia. and number 37 in the Netherlands.

== Critical reception ==
Lesley White of Smash Hits summed it up as "slick, polished and confident. A hit—with me at least." In a review of Parade for Record Mirror in which she finds little to recommend, Betty Page admitted the song had a "neat turn of melody". Number One's Phil McNeill, however, wrote that band guitarist/songwriter Gary Kemp "seems so obsessed with crafting his little pop gems, he doesn't notice how boring they are" and dismissed "Round and Round" as "well-crafted tedium".

When the band reunited for their comeback tour in 2009, Dave Simpson commented on the song in his review for The Guardian: "Other songs have aged badly – the power ballads sound like they're stuck in an '80s suburban wine bar. However, 'Round and Round'… is hugely poignant."

== Music video ==
The concept for the song's music video is the presentation of a school play by children in Key Stage 2. The video begins in the classroom as individual students daydream about the characters in the play: one sees the school headmaster as a vampire; another imagines their teacher as a snow queen. Other scenes involve rehearsals and the parents watching the play in which the boys are mostly monsters and vampires and the girls are dressed as flowers and snow princesses. Spandau Ballet were filmed separately from these scenes on a mostly bare stage with minimal set decoration. Members are shown sporadically throughout as they sing and play instruments alongside various school- and play-related props such as student desks, folding chairs, stacks of books and a blackboard. The entire video was filmed in black and white.

== Track listing ==
- 7-inch single

A. "Round and Round" – 4:34
B. "True" (live) – 6:34

- 12-inch single

A. "Round and Round" (long version) – 5:27
B1. "True" (live) – 6:34
B2. "Gold" (live) – 5:03

== Personnel ==
Credits adapted from the liner notes for Parade:

Spandau Ballet

- Tony Hadley – lead vocals
- Gary Kemp – guitar and backing vocals
- Martin Kemp – bass
- Steve Norman – saxophone and percussion
- John Keeble – drums

Additional musician

- Jess Bailey – keyboards

Production

- Tony Swain – producer, engineer
- Steve Jolley – producer
- Spandau Ballet – producers
- Richard Lengyel – engineering assistance
- Pete Hillier – equipment
- Nick Sibley – equipment
- David Band – illustration
- Mixed at Musicland Studios (Munich)

== Charts ==
Chart performance for "Round and Round"
Chart (1984–1985)	Peak position
Australia (Kent Music Report)	16
Europe (European Top 100 Singles)	18
Ireland (IRMA)	9
Italy (Musica e dischi)	11
Luxembourg (Radio Luxembourg)	16
Netherlands (Single Top 100)	37
Spain (AFYVE)	14
UK Singles (OCC)	18
