= I'll Fly for You =

1984 single by Spandau Ballet

Single by Spandau Ballet

from the album Parade
- B-side: "To Cut a Long Story Short" (live)
- Released: 13 August 1984
- Recorded: Spring 1984
- Genre: Sophisti-pop
- Length: 5:11 (single/video version); 5:37 (album version); 7:13 (Glide Mix)
- Label: Chrysalis; Reformation
- Songwriter: Gary Kemp
- Producers: Tony Swain; Steve Jolley; Spandau Ballet

Spandau Ballet singles chronology
"Only When You Leave" (1984)	"I'll Fly for You" (1984)	"Highly Strung" (1984)

"I'll Fly for You" is a song by the English new wave band Spandau Ballet, released as the second single from their fourth studio album, Parade (1984). It became the band's ninth top-10 entry in their native United Kingdom, reaching number nine on the UK singles chart. It also performed well in several other countries. The song received mixed reviews from critics. The music video was shot in and around New Orleans and incorporated a Mardi Gras parade into its storyline.

== Release and commercial performance ==
Recorded in spring 1984, "I'll Fly for You" was released in the UK in August of that year (Note: Record Mirror reported that the release date would be 13 August 1984.) (Note: Smash Hits reported that the release date would be 16 August 1984.) and peaked at number 9 there. It also reached number 6 in Italy, number 10 in Ireland, number 28 in the Netherlands, number 35 in New Zealand and number 38 in Australia.

== Critical reception ==
The song received mixed reviews upon its release. Rip It Up's Mark Phillips wrote, "Lush and cleverly constructed, this song is a winner." Betty Page of Record Mirror complained, "And how's this for spectacularly uninspired lyrics: 'And when you sing to me/the shoo-bee-doo's you sing so well'." Robert Hodgens of Smash Hits qualified his praise: "Their best single in ages. A good feel, good mood and good melody—though I find the title line inappropriate and awkward. (And that goes for the sax too!)"

In 2021, Smooth Radio ranked it as Spandau Ballet's fifth greatest song, calling it an "underrated soothing ballad".

== Music video ==
Spandau Ballet traveled to New Orleans to shoot the video for "I'll Fly for You", on which they continued their work with "Only When You Leave" director Simon Milne. Kemp told Number One magazine, "We didn't want it to look like a travelogue and just spend lots of money for the sake of it. We had a specific idea what we wanted to do involving the conflict between a desire for freedom and escape and the slavery and rough justice of the Deep South." In the video Hadley's lover (played by local New Orleans model Peggy Geibel) escapes from police custody during a Mardi Gras parade after a jury finds her guilty of the crime she committed. The end of the video shows the lovers speeding down a highway in a convertible, and the last few moments reveal their actual destination.

The BBC disapproved of a scene in which Geibel and Martin Kemp were "rolling naked in the mud" and wanted it removed. Clothing is visible in the footage that was included.

In his autobiography To Cut a Long Story Short, Hadley wrote, "John, Steve and I appeared in a fictitious courtroom scene—the first time we faced a judge together. Martin was there too. Only Gary was missing. Actually, for all it was made up, it was a lot more plausible than our genuine court appearance a few years later." (Note: Hadley, Keeble and Norman sued Gary Kemp in a dispute over royalties in 1999.)

== Track listings ==
- 7-inch single

A. "I'll Fly for You" – 5:11
B1. "To Cut a Long Story Short" (live) – 5:02

- 12-inch single

A. "I'll Fly for You" – 5:34
B1. "To Cut a Long Story Short" (live) – 5:02
B2. "I'll Fly for You" (Glide Mix) – 7:13

== Personnel ==
Credits adapted from the liner notes for Parade:

Spandau Ballet

- Tony Hadley – lead vocals
- Gary Kemp – guitar and backing vocals
- Martin Kemp – bass
- Steve Norman – saxophone and percussion
- John Keeble – drums

Additional musician

- Jess Bailey – keyboards

Production

- Tony Swain – producer, engineer
- Steve Jolley – producer
- Spandau Ballet – producers
- Richard Lengyel – engineering assistance
- Pete Hillier – equipment
- Nick Sibley – equipment
- David Band – illustration
- Mixed at Musicland Studios (Munich)

== Charts ==
Chart performance for "I'll Fly for You"
Chart (1984–1985)	Peak position
Australia (Kent Music Report)	38
Europe (European Top 100 Singles)	26
Ireland (IRMA)	10
Italy (Musica e dischi)	6
Luxembourg (Radio Luxembourg)	6
Netherlands (Dutch Top 40)	42
Netherlands (Single Top 100)	28
New Zealand (Recorded Music NZ)	35
UK Singles (OCC)	9

== Bibliography ==
- Hadley, Tony (2004). To Cut a Long Story Short. London: Sidgwick & Jackson. ISBN 978-0-283-07386-1.
