= 12″ Mixes =

12" Mixes may refer to:

- Twelve Inch Mixes (disambiguation)
- 12" Mixes (Bananarama album) Aussie only EP featuring remixes of 5 singles
- 12" Mixes Michael Jackson Aussie only EP featuring remixes of 5 singles
