= Twelve Inch Mixes =

Twelve Inch Mixes may refer to:

- The Twelve Inch Mixes, compilation album by Spandau Ballet
- A series of EPs marketed by Columbia Records in the 1980s/90s

== See also ==
- 12-inch single
