= Shooting Star Children's Hospices =

English children's hospice charity

- The 'Journey' statue at Christopher's
- Formation: 2011; 15 years ago
- Type: Children's hospice charity
- Registration no.: 1042495
- Purpose: To support families across Surrey, south-west London and north-west London from diagnosis to end of life and throughout bereavement with a range of nursing, practical, emotional and medical care.
- Region served: England
- Website: Official website

Shooting Star Children's Hospices is an English children's hospice charity (No: 1042495). The charity cares for babies, children and young people with life-limiting conditions, and their families, across Surrey, south-west London and north-west London. They provide specialist clinical and holistic care to families from diagnosis to end of life and throughout bereavement.

Shooting Star Children's Hospices offers bespoke support free of charge to families. This includes a comprehensive range of therapies and support groups, specialist nursing care and respite, symptom management, end-of-life care, and bereavement support. They currently support around 800 families who have a baby, child, or young adult with a life-limiting condition, or who have been bereaved.

== History ==
Shooting Star Children's Hospices was formed in 2011 from the merger of two existing children's hospices. CHASE (Children's Hospices Association for the South-East) and The Shooting Star Trust combined to become Shooting Star Chase, which later became Shooting Star Children's Hospices in February 2019.

CHASE was registered as a charity on 13 November 1994 after founder Julia Lever MBE was prompted by an article in a national newspaper describing the plight of a family living with their life-limited daughter. Julia soon realised there was no comparable service in South-East England. CHASE introduced its Community Care team on 10 May 1999 and Christopher's children's hospice was opened in November 2001. In 1995, Kate Turner MBE established The Shooting Star Trust with the aim of providing a home-from-home environment offering medical and practical services free of charge to families in South-West London. The charity was named Shooting Star Trust in recognition of children with life-limiting conditions, who, like shooting stars, shine bright but are gone far too soon. In 2005, Shooting Star House children's hospice in Hampton opened. Within the first month, the hospice had been used by 26 children with life-limiting conditions.

Andrew M Coppel CBE is the current Chair of Trustees.

Chief Executive Paul Farthing joined the charity in September 2021.

The Duchess of Edinburgh is the charity's royal patron. Other Patrons include Simon Cowell, Lauren Silverman, Dame Joan Collins, Tony Hadley, Tim Oliver, Michael More-Molyneux, Sarah More-Molyneux, Julia Lever MBE, Kate Turner MBE, Michael Ball OBE, Laurence and Jackie Llewelyn-Bowen, Joel Dommett, Philip Glenister and Alison Davis .

== Services ==
The charity offers support free of charge to families, 365 days a year.

Christopher's, their purpose-built hospice in Artington near Guildford, provides overnight care, including respite, symptom management stays, emergency respite and end-of-life care, as well as a range of therapies. Facilities include a sensory room, hydrotherapy pool, soft play, and cinema room. The hospice has bedrooms equipped with a range of specialist beds and hoists, and family flats for respite stays. There are also bereavement suites for end-of-life care and post bereavement, as well as memory and sensory gardens.

Shooting Star House, their Outreach, Therapies and Family Support Centre in Hampton, offers counselling, complementary therapies, drama, art and music therapy, and family support sessions. Like Christopher's, Shooting Star House has a hydrotherapy pool, sensory room, soft play, arts and crafts room and gardens for play and remembrance. Families are also able to self-refer and book sessions for the hydrotherapy pool, arts and crafts room and sensory room.

As part of the charity's 2023-2026 strategy, For Every Family, families of babies or children who have died suddenly, and not just those previously known to the charity, can access the care that Shooting Star Children's Hospices can provide to help cope with the death of a child.

Their extended bereavement service provides a new pathway of care which includes a rapid-response referral system and specialist trauma therapies. Immediate support can be provided to schools and nurseries, and the team has expanded to make sure they can respond to this demand.

== Catchment Area ==
The charity provides its services across Surrey and the London Boroughs of Brent, Croydon, Ealing, Hammersmith and Fulham, Harrow, Hillingdon, Hounslow, Kensington and Chelsea, Kingston upon Thames, Merton, Richmond upon Thames, Sutton, Wandsworth and Westminster. Referrals can be made by healthcare professionals, or directly by families that feel they meet the criteria for support.

== Funding ==
Shooting Star Children's Hospices receives some central government funding, but the majority of its revenue comes from donations and fundraising. As well as individual gifts, regular donations and gifts left in wills, the charity also raises money from individuals representing them at various events including the London Marathon, Surrey Half Marathon, Hampton Court Palace Half Marathon and the Thames Path Challenge. Their flagship fundraising event is a ball held yearly at the Royal Lancaster Hotel.

The charity receives the support of a number of local and regional corporate partners and supporters, who hold company fundraising events, offer sponsorship and volunteering support.

A large amount of fundraising is also generated through local communities, from individuals, schools and education as well as dedicated ‘Friends of Shooting Star Children’s Hospices’ groups.

Shooting Star Children's Hospices also runs eight charity shops, which are located in Cobham, Godalming, Guildford, Hampton Hill, Knaphill, Shepperton, Teddington, and Weybridge.
