= Soul Boys of the Western World =

Soul Boys of the Western World is a 2014 documentary film which explores the history of the New Romantic band Spandau Ballet. It was directed by George Hencken.
