= Spandau Ballet =

English pop band

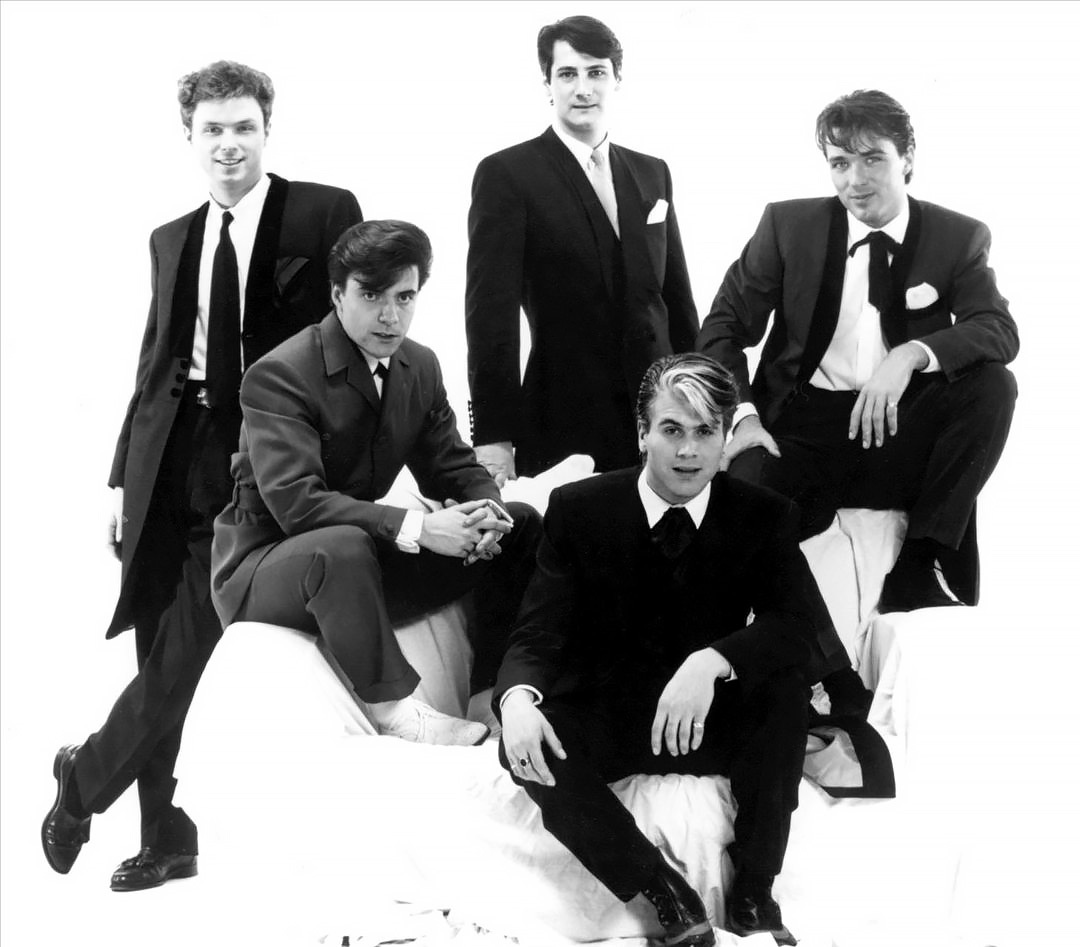
- Spandau Ballet, c. 1983

Background information
- Origin: Islington, London, England
- Genres: Pop; new wave; synth-pop; blue-eyed soul
- Years active: 1979–1990; 2009–2019
- Labels: Chrysalis; Reformation Records; Mercury; Epic; Columbia; Parlophone
- Past members: Tony Hadley; Gary Kemp; Martin Kemp; John Keeble; Steve Norman; Ross William Wild
- Website: www.spandauballet.com

Spandau Ballet (/ˈspændaʊ ˈbæleɪ/ SPAN-dow BAL-ay) were an English pop band formed in Islington, London, in 1979. Inspired by the capital's post-punk underground dance scene, they emerged at the start of the 1980s as The Applause, playing "European dance music" as the house band for the "Blitz Kids" club night. They became one of the most successful groups of the New Romantic era of British pop, were members of the new pop movement, and were part of the Second British Invasion of the Billboard Top 40 in the 1980s, selling 25 million albums and having 23 hit singles worldwide. The band have had eight UK top 10 albums, including three greatest hits compilations and an album of re-recorded material. Their musical influences ranged from punk rock and soul music to the American crooners Frank Sinatra and Tony Bennett.

The band's classic lineup featured Gary Kemp on guitar, synthesiser and backing vocals; his brother, Martin Kemp, on bass; vocalist Tony Hadley; saxophonist Steve Norman; and drummer John Keeble. Gary Kemp was also the band's songwriter. Their debut single "To Cut a Long Story Short" reached No. 5 in the UK in 1980 and was the first of ten UK top-10 singles. The band peaked in popularity in 1983 with the album True, as its title track reached No. 1 in the UK and the top 5 in the US. In 2011, it received a BMI award as one of the most-played songs in US history with four million airplays. In 1984, they received a Brit Award for technical excellence and were the first act to be approached by Bob Geldof to join the original Band Aid lineup. In 1985, they performed at the Live Aid benefit concert at Wembley Stadium.

In 1990, the band played their last live show before a 19-year absence. In 1999, Hadley, Norman and Keeble launched an unsuccessful case in the High Court against Gary Kemp and his Reformation Publishing Company for a share of the band's songwriting royalties. Spandau Ballet reformed in 2009 for The Reformation Tour, a sell-out "greatest hits" world tour. In 2014, their archive-only feature-length documentary biopic, Soul Boys of the Western World, was world-premiered at SXSW Film Festival in Austin, Texas. It was officially screened at the Rome, Ghent (Belgium) and NYC Doc film festivals and received its European premiere at the Royal Albert Hall, London.

In 2017, Hadley left Spandau Ballet. A year later, singer and actor Ross William Wild became their new frontman for a series of European live dates and a one-off show at Eventim's Hammersmith Apollo. In May 2019, Wild tweeted that he had quit the band "to pursue my own music with my band Mercutio", while Spandau bass player Martin Kemp confirmed there were no further plans for the band to tour without original singer Hadley.

== History ==
=== 1976–1982: Formation and early success ===
Gary Kemp and Steve Norman first decided to form a band, both playing guitar, in October 1976 after witnessing the Sex Pistols perform that summer at Islington's Screen on the Green. Close friends and school mates at Dame Alice Owen's in Islington, they were joined by John Keeble on drums, Michael Ellison on bass and Tony Hadley on vocals when the school relocated to Potters Bar. They rehearsed at lunchtimes in the school's music room, playing sped-up versions of the Rolling Stones' "Silver Train", the Beatles' "I Wanna Be Your Man" and the Animals' "We've Gotta Get Out of This Place". They also played an original Gary Kemp composition, "I've Got Roots", which inspired their band name, Roots. Their first gig was a fourth-form Christmas party in December 1976 in the school dining room.

The band changed their name to the Cut when Michael Ellison left, with Steve Norman filling in on bass. In 1977 another Alice Owen pupil, Richard Miller, took over on bass guitar and the band changed their name to the Makers, playing power pop compositions by Gary Kemp or Steve Norman, with titles like "Fantasy Girl" and "Pin-Ups", inspired by mid-sixties bands like the Small Faces. They received a number of positive gig reviews from the British music press in Sounds and the New Musical Express. The band changed personnel and name once more when their manager, friend and fellow Dame Alice Owen's schoolmate Steve Dagger suggested Martin Kemp be brought in as their bass player after seeing how much attention he got from the Makers' female fans when he was their roadie. The band was now called Gentry and Martin played his first gig on 1 July 1978 at the Middlesex Polytechnic in Cockfosters.

Inspired by London's new underground nightclub scene, which began in Autumn 1978 with a weekly Tuesday night hosted by Steve Strange and DJ Rusty Egan at Billy's in Soho, the band switched musical direction to embrace the new electronic music. Friend and writer Robert Elms suggested they change their name to Spandau Ballet, a phrase which he told them he had seen written on a wall on a weekend trip to West Berlin: “Rudolf Hess, all alone, dancing the Spandau ballet”. The graffiti was referring to Hess as the last living Nuremberg war criminal imprisoned alone at Spandau Prison. The term "Spandau ballet" originated in World War I as a description of the twitching movements Allied soldiers made while being shot by the German Spandau machine gun.

Their first performance was an invitation-only showcase on the morning of Saturday 17 November 1979, at Halligan's Band Centre rehearsal studio, 103 Holloway Road, to test the reaction of the key influencers of the new scene. Having passed that 'audition', the band's first gig as Spandau Ballet was at the Blitz's Christmas party on 5 December 1979.

=== Journeys to Glory ===
A series of exclusive 'secret' gigs in 1980 at unique non-rock venues like the Scala cinema and the cruiser HMS Belfast, advertised only by word-of-mouth, created the hype for a major record companies bidding war. After the band signed with Chrysalis Records, they released "To Cut a Long Story Short", produced by Landscape's Richard James Burgess. It became a top five hit on the UK charts in late 1980, as well as reaching the top 20 in Australia, Ireland and Spain. Their second single, "The Freeze", was another top 20 hit in the UK, Ireland and Spain, followed by the double A-side "Muscle Bound"/"Glow" and the gold-certified debut album Journeys to Glory in early 1981.

The band played their first US showcase in May 1981 at New York's Underground Club, on 17th and Broadway, with a fashion show by Axiom, a co-operative of the London club scene's new clothes designers including Sade Adu. Spandau were the first UK pop band to perform live at the world-famous Ku Club in Ibiza.

Reflecting the rapidly evolving club scene and Soho's hippest new nightspot, Le Beat Route on Greek Street, the band changed musical directions again, releasing the funk single "Chant No. 1 (I Don't Need This Pressure On)", which was a No. 3 hit in the UK while reaching No. 17 in the US on Billboard magazine's Disco Top 100 in 1981. The song was championed by DJ Frankie Crocker on WBLS.

=== Diamond ===
The follow-up album, Diamond, also produced by Burgess, was released in 1982. This album was certified gold by the BPI. The band had Burgess remix every single from both albums for inclusion on each single's B-side and for 12-inch club releases. These mixes were later released as a boxed set. However, the second single from Diamond was "Paint Me Down", which broke their run of top 20 hits by stalling at No. 30. The third single, "She Loved Like Diamond", failed to make the UK top 40 at all.

Trevor Horn remixed the track "Instinction", which was released as the fourth single from the album. Backed with a special dance remix of "Chant No. 1" on the 12-inch single version, the release was very well received. It returned the band to the UK top 10 after the poor chart performance of their previous two singles.

=== True ===
The band released their third album, True, in March 1983. Produced by Tony Swain and Steve Jolley, the album featured a slicker pop sound and was recorded at Compass Point in the Bahamas. It was at this point that Steve Norman began playing saxophone for the band. The title track gave the band their first UK No. 1 single. It was a multi-format hit in the US, reaching No. 1 on the Adult Contemporary chart, No. 4 on the Billboard Hot 100 and US Cash Box and also entering the US R&B charts. The band played four sell-out shows at The Wilton and The Palace, Los Angeles, in December 1983. The song was also a No. 1 in Ireland and Canada and top 5 in the Netherlands, Australia, New Zealand and Spain. It won a BMI award as one of the most played songs in history when it passed four million airplays in the United States, the equivalent of 22 years' continuous play.

The follow-up single, "Gold", reached No. 2 in the UK and the top 5 in Belgium, Ireland and Spain. The album topped the charts internationally, spent 64 consecutive weeks in the top 100 albums chart and reached No. 19 on the US Billboard 200. The singles "Gold" and "Communication" peaked at numbers 29 and 59 respectively on the Billboard Hot 100. On their UK tour they were the first rock band to play Sadler's Wells and the Royal Festival Hall.

=== Parade and Live Aid period ===
The follow-up album, Parade, was released in June 1984, and its singles were again big successes in the charts in Europe, Oceania and Canada. The album's opening song, "Only When You Leave", became the band's last American hit. The band's first top 10 single in Italy was "I'll Fly for You", a success they repeated later with the singles "Fight for Ourselves" and "Through the Barricades". At the end of 1984, the band performed on the Band Aid charity single alongside chart rivals Duran Duran, Culture Club and Wham!, and in 1985 performed at Wembley Stadium as part of Live Aid to a global audience estimated at 1.9 billion.

The "Spandau Ballet World Parade 84–85" was the group's biggest tour to date, spanning Europe, America, the Far East and, for the first time, Australia and New Zealand. Their UK tour ended with six record-breaking nights at Wembley Arena. During the second show at LA's Universal Amphitheatre, Steve Norman tore the anterior cruciate ligament in his knee and the rest of the tour was cancelled. This also resulted in the cancellation of a proposed summer tour of Spain and Italy and a planned six-week tour of the United States supporting the Power Station.

During this same year, Spandau Ballet achieved platinum status with the compilation The Singles Collection, which kept the focus on the band between studio albums and celebrated its five years of success. The album was released by Chrysalis Records without the band's approval and the band instigated legal action against the label.

=== Through the Barricades ===
After a bitter court case with Chrysalis, Spandau Ballet signed to CBS Records for £1.5 million in 1986 and released their fifth studio album, Through the Barricades. With producer Gary Langan, the band moved away from their pop and soul influences to create a stadium rock sound. A dispute between Our Price Records and Sony over trading arrangements resulted in the Our Price chain and its chart return shops refusing to stock any CBS singles, which affected the record sales of their first single release, "Fight for Ourselves". Though it peaked at 15 in the UK, it was a top 10 hit in Italy and the Netherlands. The title track, a personal favourite of Kemp and Hadley and inspired by the killing of a friend, Thomas "Kidso" Reilly in Belfast by Private Ian Thain, reached the top 10 in the UK and in Europe, as did the album.

This was followed in 1986/87 by the band's largest European concert tour to date, "Through the Barricades – Across the Borders", with six record-breaking nights at the Ahoy Stadium in Rotterdam, another six nights at London's Wembley Arena, 80,000 at Casa de Campo in Madrid and 50,000 at an open-air concert in Treviso. Hadley and Gary Kemp performed "Through the Barricades" for the Prince's Trust at Wembley Arena with the 'house band' of Eric Clapton, Midge Ure and Phil Collins, and "With a Little Help from My Friends" with George Harrison and Ringo Starr. In 1988, the band played for the King of Spain in front of the Royal Palace in Barcelona, on the same bill as Freddie Mercury and Montserrat Caballé, to launch the campaign for the 1992 Olympics.

=== Heart Like a Sky ===
After a hiatus from recording, the band released their next album, Heart Like a Sky, initially titled Home, in September 1989. For the first time, new working methods were employed, as Gary Kemp demoed his new songs programming the drums, keyboards and bass on a Tascam PortaStudio with Toby Chapman, Spandau's session keyboard player, rather than rehearsing with the band. The album and its singles were not successful in the UK and the album was not released in the United States. Nevertheless, the band continued to have success in West Germany, Belgium, Italy and the Netherlands, where the singles "Raw" and "Be Free with Your Love" entered the top 40. The album included "Motivator", the first song written by Steve Norman for the band since The Makers.

=== 1990–1999: Break-up and solo projects ===
On Tuesday 6 March 1990, the band played the final date of their 10th anniversary tour at Edinburgh Playhouse before taking a break to pursue other acting and musical solo projects.

Gary and Martin Kemp took the leading roles as notorious East End gangster twins Ronald and Reginald Kray in The Krays which premiered in London in April 1990. The film won two Evening Standard British Film Awards for Best Film and Most Promising Newcomer (writer Philip Ridley). Tony Hadley recorded his first solo album in Los Angeles produced by Ron Nevison. Steve Norman moved to Ibiza to collaborate on chilled out Balearic records with local producers. John Keeble continued as drummer with Tony Hadley and formed his own band, 69 Daze, with former Sigue Sigue Sputnik guitarist Neal X, followed by 99 shows across Europe with The Herbs and Pacific with guitarist John McGeoch.

Gary Kemp enjoyed further acting success, moving to Hollywood with actor wife Sadie Frost, to film both The Bodyguard (with Whitney Houston and Kevin Costner) and Killing Zoe, directed by Academy Award winner Roger Avary, produced by Quentin Tarantino. In 1995 Gary released his solo album, Little Bruises.

Martin Kemp also appeared in films and TV series in Los Angeles such as The Outer Limits, Murder Between Friends, Highlander: The Series and Sugar Town which also starred John Taylor from Duran Duran.

In the 1990s, the band split up after a disagreement about royalties. Hadley, Norman and Keeble launched an unsuccessful court case against Gary Kemp for a share of Kemp's songwriting royalties from his work with Spandau Ballet. Although they vowed to appeal against the verdict, they later decided against this. The three non-Kemp members then continued to tour as a trio, but they had to sell their shares in Spandau Ballet's company to Gary Kemp to pay off legal debts. Because the company owned the rights to the name of Spandau Ballet, the trio had to tour under the moniker "Hadley, Norman and Keeble, ex-Spandau Ballet".

After successful surgery for the removal of two brain tumours in the mid-Nineties, Martin Kemp joined EastEnders in 1998 as one of the British soap's most popular bad boy characters, Steve Owen, winning Most Popular Actor at the 2000 National Television Awards and numerous Best Actor and Villain of the Year awards for the British Soap Awards, Inside Soap Awards and TV Quick Awards. He left EastEnders in 2002 for a golden handcuff deal with ITV drama and wrote his best-selling autobiography, True. He also wrote and directed his first film, Martin Kemp's Stalker.

Gary Kemp wrote songs with Paul Stratham, who had written songs for Dido, continued acting on stage, in film and in television, and wrote music and additional lyrics with Guy Pratt for Bedbug at the National Theatre in 2004 and A Terrible Beauty, with Guy Pratt and Shane Connaughton. He continued acting on stage, in film and on television. He played Serge in the West End production of Art in 2001. Films included Dog Eat Dog and American Daylight and TV shows Murder in Mind and Casualty.

Steve Norman formed chilled lounge band Cloudfish with Rafa Peletey and Shelley Preston in 2001. Tony Hadley released three studio albums. He played Billy Flynn in the West End production of Chicago and won the ITV reality show, Reborn in the USA in 2003 singing "Through the Barricades" to beat Michelle Gayle in the final. He appeared as a guest vocalist on the Alan Parsons album The Time Machine, performing lead vocals on the song "Out of the Blue".

=== 2009–2019: Reunion ===
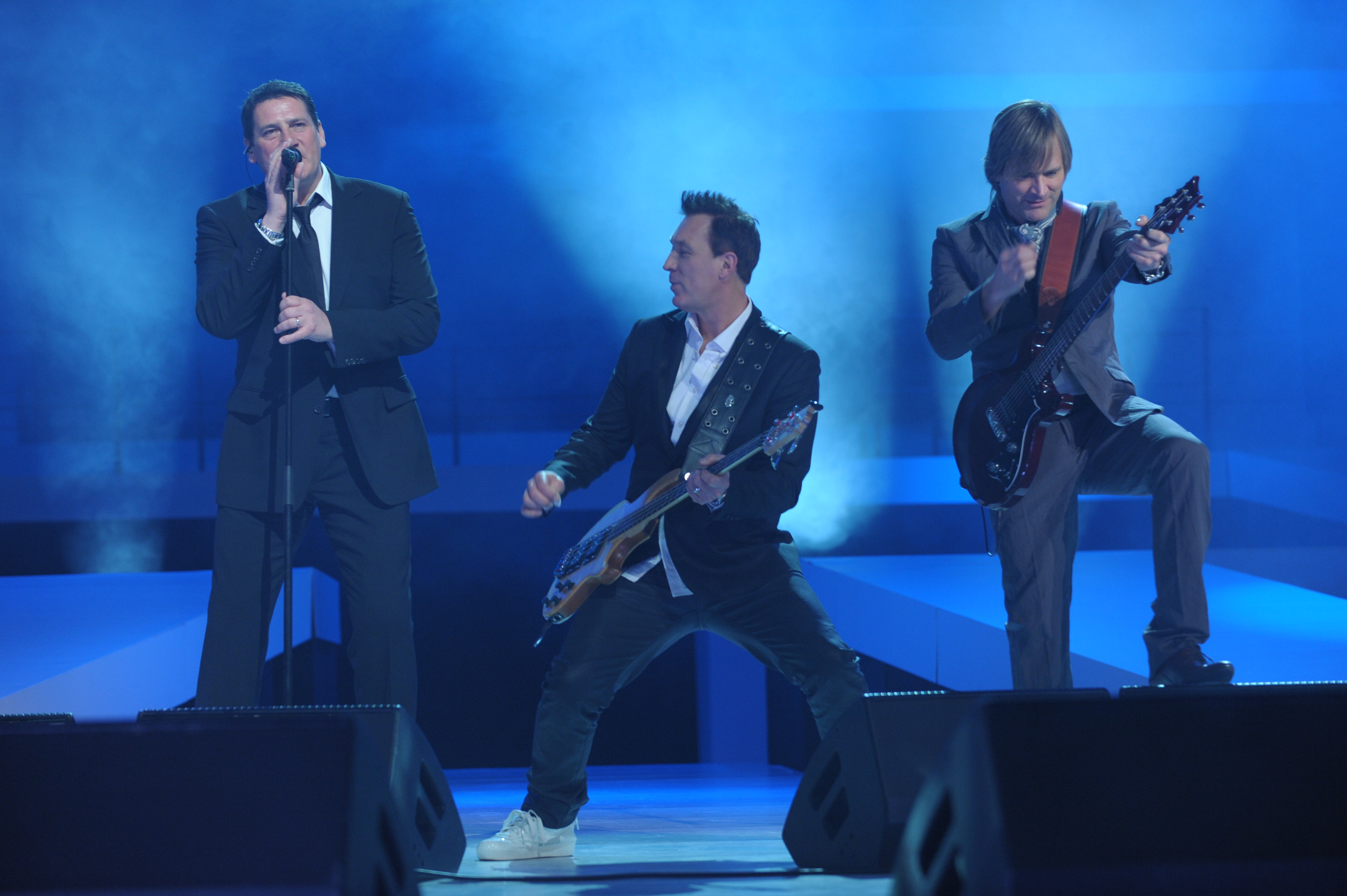
Reunited Spandau Ballet performing at Berlin Fashion Week in January 2010

In early 2009, the official Spandau Ballet website encouraged fans to sign up "for an exciting announcement", fuelling rumours that a reunion was imminent. Jonathan Ross mentioned during his BBC Radio 2 programme on 21 March 2009, that the band were re-forming and that he had been invited to the reunion party.

The band confirmed the rumours at a press conference on 25 March 2009, on board HMS Belfast in London, a return to the venue of one of their first gigs to launch their comeback tour. They were introduced by friend and broadcaster Robert Elms after a Billy's and Blitz era DJ set by Rusty Egan. John Keeble and Gary Kemp revealed current musical influences as The Killers, Kaiser Chiefs, MGMT and Florence and the Machine.

The band began a world tour in October 2009, starting with eight dates across Ireland and the UK, the first of which was in Dublin on 13 October 2009. The tickets for the UK and Ireland shows went on pre-sale on the official Spandau Ballet website on 25 March 2009. They went on general release on 27 March 2009. For the general release tickets, the London O2 arena tickets sold out within 20 minutes and an extra two dates were added there because of demand. The band also added Liverpool and an extra date in Birmingham to the tour. Members gave their "first public performance and interview anywhere in the world for 19 years" on the BBC television show Friday Night with Jonathan Ross on 24 April 2009 performing "Chant No.1" with the original Beggar & Co and "Gold".

On 19 October 2009, the group released a new album, Once More, which featured reworked semi-acoustic versions of 11 Spandau favourites and two new songs, the title track, written by Gary Kemp and Steve Norman, and Love Is All, the first Spandau song to be written by Tony Hadley. The album went Gold in Italy and Silver in the UK. Virgin Media honoured Spandau Ballet as the Best Comeback of 2009 in the Virgin Media Awards.

Spandau Ballet went on tour in Australia during April 2010 with Tears For Fears as part of a world tour. After a headline set at the Isle of Wight Festival on the same bill as Paul McCartney, The Strokes, Jay-Z and Pink, the group played their last UK show of the Reformation Tour at Newmarket Racecourse on 25 June 2010.

In 2014, all five played live again with an anthology world tour to promote a critically acclaimed feature-length archive-only documentary of the band's story and the pop cultural history of the Eighties, Soul Boys of the Western World. It world premiered at South By Southwest with Spandau also playing as part of the music festival, their first public appearance in North America since 1985. The band played five numbers for the film's European premiere at the Royal Albert Hall. There were gala screenings in Sydney, Hong Kong, Melbourne, Auckland and Hamburg. The film had a UK cinema release. It was directed by George Hencken, produced by Steve Dagger and Scott Milaney with archive producer Kate Griffiths and included never-before-seen footage of the band playing and being interviewed at NYC's Underground club in March 1981.

It was confirmed on 31 July 2014, that Spandau Ballet were working on new material in the studio with Trevor Horn. In the UK, the band appeared in an ITV show, Spandau Ballet – True Gold, in which they performed several hits and were interviewed by Christine Bleakley in front of a studio audience. The band performed their 1980s hit single "True" and a new song called "This Is the Love" on Jimmy Kimmel Live on 11 November 2014. It was their US late-night TV debut and their first US TV appearance since 1985 when they played on Soul Train. They were there to promote their new greatest hits collection called The Story – The Very Best of Spandau Ballet, which also contained three new songs. The album reached the UK top 10. Both "Steal" and "This Is The Love" appeared on the US Adult Contemporary chart.

The band embarked on another world tour in 2015. In January 2015, they appeared on The Today Show, performing "True". They also appeared on The Talk on 27 July 2015 to perform "True".

On 3 July 2017, Tony Hadley left the band due to, as he stated on Twitter, circumstances beyond his control. The rest of the band released their own statement explaining that Hadley had made it clear to them in September 2016 that he did not want to work with the band any more and that they had now reached the decision "to move on as a band."

The initial plan was for Seal to replace Hadley as Spandau's singer. According to Gary Kemp, an agreement for a tour was reached with Seal but, as the band was waiting for him to fly in and start to rehearse, he eventually backed off.

On 6 June 2018, after a lengthy audition process Spandau Ballet revealed their new lead singer, Ross William Wild, who had previously performed with Martin Kemp in the West End musical Million Dollar Quartet. The band played live at Subterania Club in West London, a venue they had last played 40 years earlier in 1978 as Gentry when it was called Acklam Hall. Their first song as the new line-up was "Through the Barricades". Wild said: "If it wasn't for Spandau so much stuff wouldn't have happened. They are pioneers."

Spandau Ballet finished the year showcasing Wild with five live gigs abroad (Milan, Rome, Padova, Utrecht, Tilburg) concluding with another at the Eventim Apollo in London on 29 October, and attracted favourable reviews.

On 16 October 2018, Hadley played the London Palladium with The Tony Hadley Band.

Within five months cracks were appearing in Spandau's new line-up. In March 2019, Wild joined a new band called Mercutio, saying: "I can't wait around for Spandau! Unfortunately Gary [Kemp] has commitments, so we're waiting him to finish until we crack on." One month later Gary Kemp, touring the US with Nick Mason's Saucerful of Secrets, said in an interview: "There are no plans for Spandau going into 2020." He said he struggled to imagine Spandau Ballet without Tony Hadley, adding: "I still think that's the ultimate goal". Then on 23 May 2019, Wild tweeted at 6:15am: "I have formally quit the band @SpandauBallet to pursue my own music with my band Mercutio." By 10:30am Martin Kemp was on ITV's This Morning confirming that Spandau would not be touring "until Tony [Hadley] comes back".

The next day Spandau thanked Wild via Twitter for "his brilliant performances with them last year and wish him every success with his band, Mercutio". Within the next few days Wild explained further: "I'd put my whole life on hold and was sick of waiting around for them to make up their minds. I told the boys I was quitting and then never heard back from them." The band's sax player Steve Norman also said: "I was neither involved in nor informed of any discussions or decision-making regarding the future of my band, least of all Ross's position in it." Wild was subsequently arrested in March 2021 and charged (under his real name, Ross Davidson) with a series of sex offences dating back to 2013. He was convicted in 2024 of voyeurism, raping a woman and sexually assaulting two others. In January 2026, he was found guilty of a further count of rape. On 30 April 2026 he was sentenced to 14 years in prison.

On 19 April 2026, Gary Kemp announced plans for Spandau Ballet to reunite for a comeback tour. However, Tony Hadley declined to participate, and the proposed reunion did not proceed.

== In popular culture ==
Actor Edward Norton appeared on the ABC sitcom Modern Family as Izzy LaFontaine, a fictional bass player/backing vocalist for Spandau Ballet ("between Richard Miller and Martin Kemp"), in the episode "Great Expectations". Claire hired him to play for Phil as an anniversary gift for him.

In the 1984 movie Sixteen Candles, Samantha (Molly Ringwald) watches her crush, Jake (Michael Schoeffling), dancing with his girlfriend to the song "True".

== Members ==
- John Keeble – drums, percussion, backing vocals (1979–1990, 2009–2019)
- Gary Kemp – guitars, keyboards, synthesizers, piano, backing vocals (1979–1990, 2009–2019)
- Martin Kemp – bass guitar, guitar, backing vocals (1979–1990, 2009–2019)
- Steve Norman – saxophones, wind synthesizer, guitar, percussion, keyboards, backing vocals (1979–1990, 2009–2019)
- Tony Hadley – lead vocals, keyboards, synthesizers, percussion (1979–1990, 2009–2017)
- Ross William Wild – lead vocals (2018–2019; tour only)

== Discography ==
- Journeys to Glory (1981)
- Diamond (1982)
- True (1983)
- Parade (1984)
- Through the Barricades (1986)
- Heart Like a Sky (1989)
- Once More (2009)

== Awards and nominations ==
=== Q Awards ===
The Q Awards are hosted annually by the music magazine Q. Spandau Ballet has received one award.

Year	Nominee / work	Award	Result
2009	Spandau Ballet	The Q Idol	Won

=== BRIT Awards ===
The BRIT Awards are the British Phonographic Industry's annual pop music awards. Spandau Ballet has received one award from one nomination.

Year	Nominee / work	Award	Result
1984	Spandau Ballet	The Sony Award For Technical Excellence	Won

=== Ivor Novello Awards ===
The Ivor Novello Awards are awards for songwriting and composing, presented annually in London.

Year	Nominee / work	Award	Result
2012	Gary Kemp	Outstanding Song Collection	Won

Variety Club of Great Britain Awards

Year	Nominee / work	Award	Result
2009	Spandau Ballet	Outstanding Contribution To Popular Music Award	Won

=== Virgin Media Music Awards ===
Year	Nominee / work	Award	Result	Ref.
2009	Spandau Ballet	Best Comeback	Won	

== See also ==
- List of best-selling music artists

== Literature ==
- Barrat, David (2018). New Romantics Who Never Were – The Untold Story. Orsam Books. ISBN 9780957091726.
- Hadley, Tony (2004). To Cut A Long Story Short. Sidgwick & Jackson. ISBN 978-0-283-07386-1.
- Kemp, Gary (2009). I Know This Much. Fourth Estate. ISBN 978-0-00-732330-2.
- Kemp, Martin (2000). True: The Autobiography of Martin Kemp. Orion. ISBN 0-7528-3264-6.
