= John Keeble =

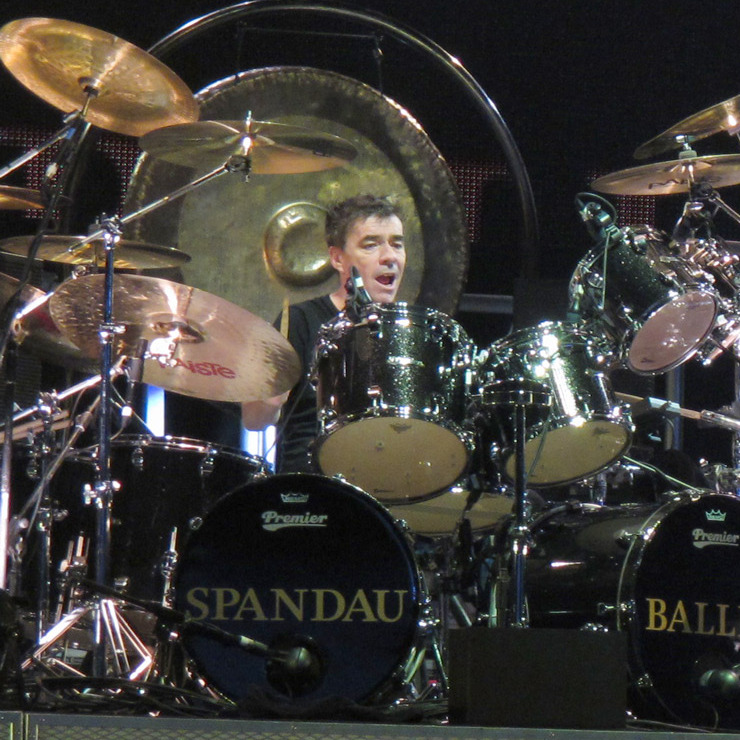
- Keeble with Spandau Ballet in 2009

Background information
- Born: John Leslie Keeble; 6 July 1959 (age 67); Hampstead, London, England
- Genres: Pop; new wave; rock
- Occupation: Drummer
- Years active: 1979–present

John Leslie Keeble (born 6 July 1959) is an English pop and rock drummer. He is best known for his membership of the 1980s new wave band Spandau Ballet.

== Early years ==
Keeble was athletic as a child, playing both football and cricket. He bought his first drum kit at the age of 16 and started pursuing an interest in music in a Dame Alice Owen's School band called The Cut with Gary Kemp, Tony Hadley and Steve Norman in 1976. The band soon recruited Kemp's brother Martin on bass, which completed the line-up. The band was later named The Makers, The Gentry and then Spandau Ballet.

== Spandau Ballet ==
Spandau Ballet produced a number of international hits including "True", "Gold" and "Through the Barricades". In 1984 the band participated in the Band Aid charity project and Live Aid the following year. The band broke up in 1990, after their final studio album, Heart Like a Sky, failed to live up to the critical and commercial success of their earlier albums, such as True and Parade.

In 1999, John Keeble, along with fellow band members Tony Hadley and Steve Norman, attempted to sue former Spandau Ballet guitarist, Gary Kemp, for alleged unpaid royalties. They claimed that an agreement had existed between Kemp and the rest of the band, whereby Kemp, who was the main songwriter in the band, would pay his bandmates a share of the royalties earned. The claims were vigorously denied by Kemp, and Keeble, Hadley and Norman subsequently lost their court case. Although initially vowing to appeal against the verdict, they later decided against this.

Keeble, with Gary Kemp, was instrumental in setting up Spandau Ballet's reunion in the 2000s. On 25 March 2009, he joined the rest of his original classic-line-up bandmates for a press conference at HMS Belfast, to announce that the band had reformed and would conduct a world tour starting in Dublin in October 2009.

== Other work ==
Keeble played drums for Fish, the former lead singer of Marillion, during his first-ever solo show in the Rex Cinema at Lockerbie on 21 March 1989. He performed on the single "State of Mind", the third track on Fish's debut solo album Vigil in a Wilderness of Mirrors.

Keeble has also worked with 69 Daze, The Herbs, Pacific and Tim Deluxe.

After the original breakup of Spandau Ballet, he played in the Tony Hadley solo band and was on tour throughout 2006. Keeble has also formed his own rock band, I Play Rock, with Richie B and Chris Paulo Dale, in which he plays drums and provides vocals.

== Personal life ==
Keeble became friends with Fish when they met at Live Aid. Keeble married his wife Leaflyn in 1988 and Fish gave her away at the wedding. The couple have a daughter Jaime Rae Keeble (born 1990).
