= Steve Norman =

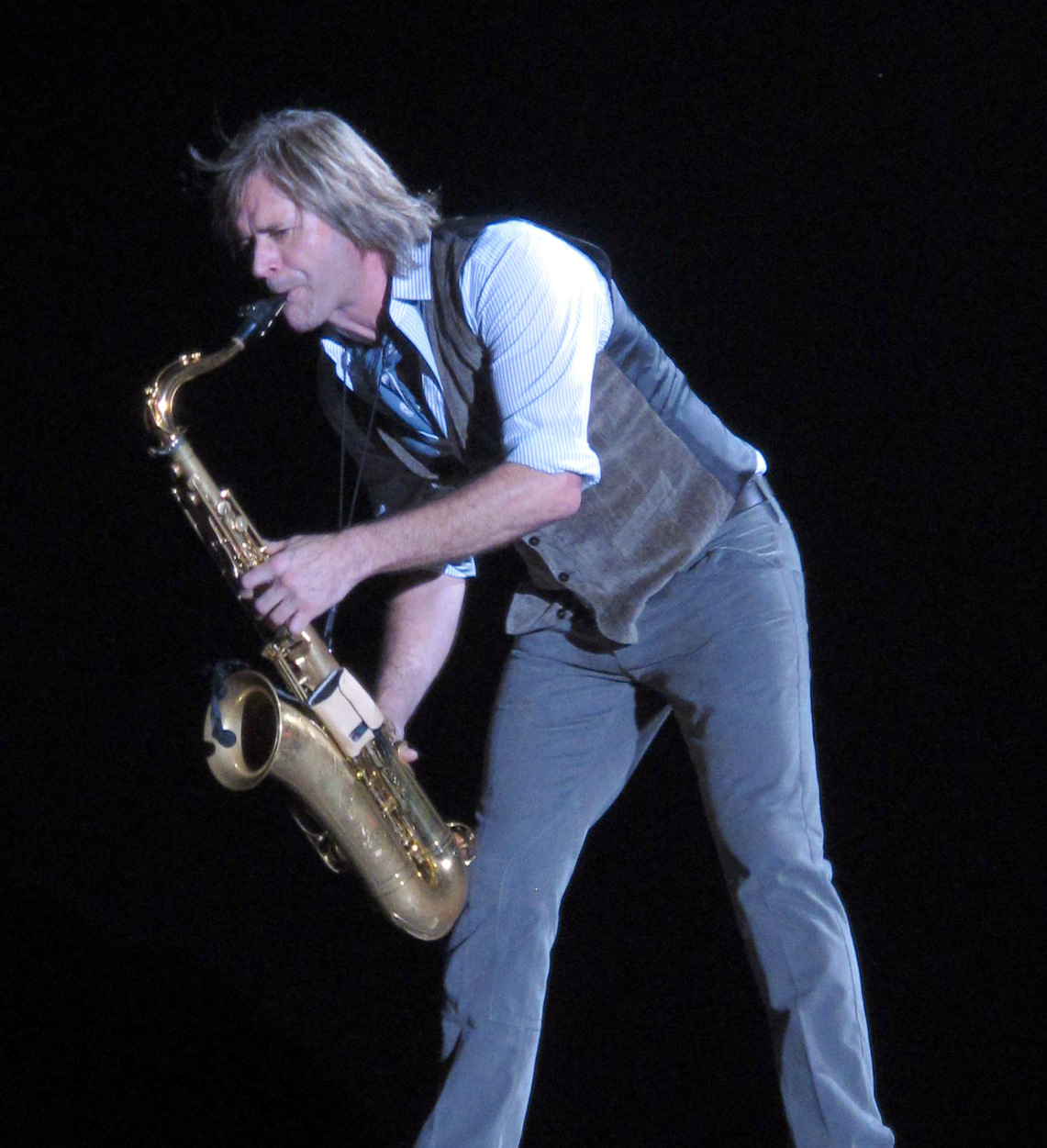
- Norman in October 2009

Background information
- Born: Steven Antony Norman; 25 March 1960 (age 66); London, England
- Genres: Synthpop; new wave; pop rock
- Occupations: Musician; producer; songwriter
- Instruments: Saxophone; guitar; percussion; vocals; keyboards
- Years active: 1979–present
- Label: Chrysalis
- Website: stevenorman-official.com

Steven Antony Norman (born 25 March 1960) is an English musician who played tenor saxophone, guitar, percussion and other instruments for the English new wave band Spandau Ballet.

== Biography ==
=== Early years ===
Steve Norman was born in Stepney, east London, and was considered a musical child prodigy. He started pursuing an interest in popular music as a guitarist in a Dame Alice Owen's School band called the Cut with Gary Kemp, Tony Hadley and John Keeble in 1976. The band was later named the Makers, the Gentry and then Spandau Ballet.

=== Spandau Ballet ===
Spandau Ballet signed with Chrysalis Records. By the third Spandau Ballet album, Norman brought percussion to the mix and introduced the tenor saxophone, which has since become his signature instrument. With Spandau Ballet, Norman toured the globe and continued to have hits throughout the 1980s. In 1985 Norman appeared with the band at Live Aid at Wembley Stadium.

Because of a dispute over royalties, the band split up in the early 1990s. On 25 March 2009, Norman, Gary Kemp, Martin Kemp, Tony Hadley and John Keeble announced their reunion at a press conference on board HMS Belfast. The band also announced their 'Reformation Tour' starting in October 2009.

Norman co-wrote the song "Once More", which became the first new Spandau Ballet single in 20 years.

=== After Spandau Ballet ===
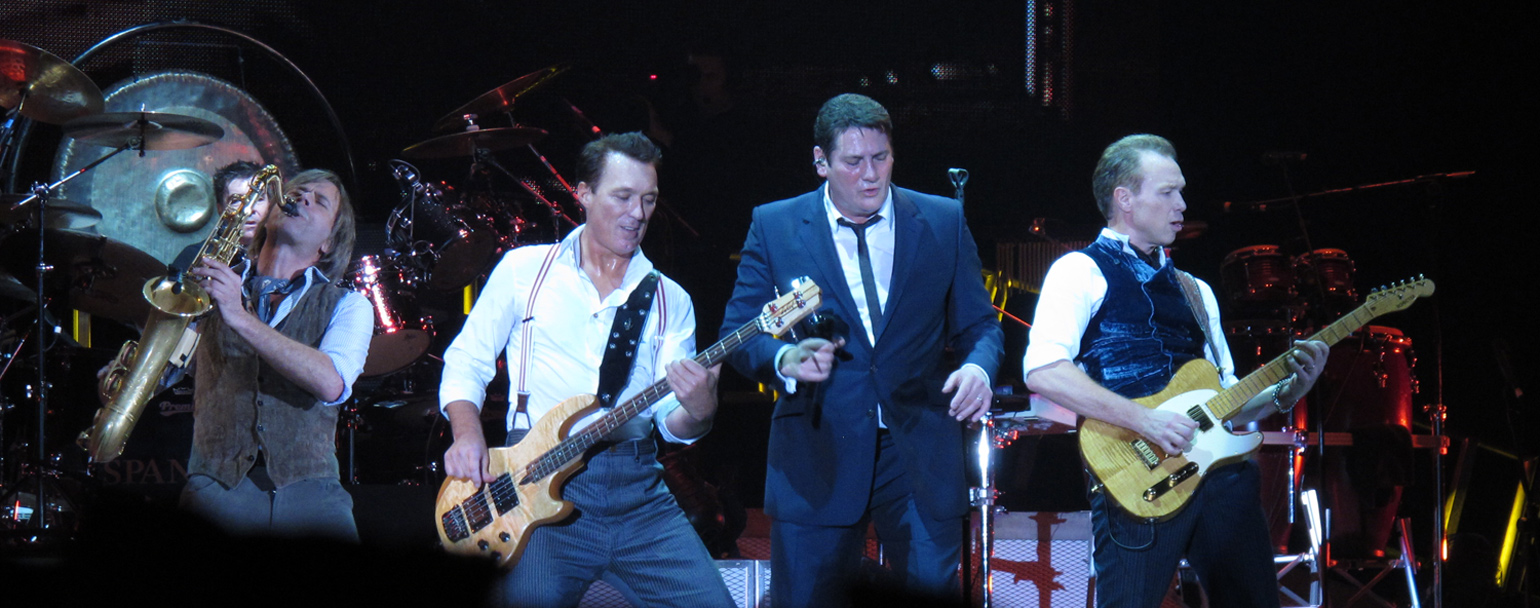
Spandau Ballet at Echo Arena Liverpool, November 2009

In the early 1990s after the band went their separate ways, Norman moved to Ibiza and took some time off from performing. During his time on the island, Norman collaborated with numerous musicians and producers who lived there, including Lenny Krarup, Nacho Sotomayor, Stefan Zauner and DJ Pippi. Norman also worked with Rafa Peletey on various projects, including Funky Jack's "Saxomatic" percussion mix. Norman also sourced and compiled the music for the Made in Ibiza Chills n' Thrills compilation album and co-compiled A Journey Through Savannah with Peletey for their record label, Island Pulse Records.

Norman continued to play live at house music events throughout the UK and on the international club scene, performing with his saxophone, or occasionally percussion alongside such musicians as Byron Stingily of Ten City, Frankie Knuckles, Angie Brown, Steve Edwards, Alison Limerick, Jeremy Healy and Brandon Block. Norman formed a partnership with Hed Kandi, DJ John Jones and Martin Ikin from Soul Purpose called 'The Collective'. Their first production was a re-working of Joe Smooth's "Promised Land" featuring Peyton on lead vocals and Shelley Preston (formerly of Bucks Fizz) on backing vocals.

In 2012 and again in 2014, Norman was the featured guest saxophonist and percussionist for Steve Harley’s performances of the first two Cockney Rebel albums with orchestra and choir. In 2013, Norman played on three tracks on Bruce Foxton's album, Back in the Room. He also played on James Stevenson's album Everything's Getting Closer To Being Over released in 2014. The band he is performing live with as of 2021 is called The Sleevz.

Norman has performed at various concerts in aid of The Prince's Trust charity. He also played at the "Free Nelson Mandela Concert" some years later along with Tony Hadley.

=== Cloudfish ===
In 2001, Norman and Rafa Peletey formed a production team called Cloudfish and invited Shelley Preston to provide the vocals. As a result, Cloudfish became a band with Norman, Preston and Peletey writing and producing their own songs. Peletey left in 2003 to front his own band, joining up with Norman and Preston from time to time.

Cloudfish have continued to write, produce and perform and were featured artists on the eponymous CD of the Italian quintet, Quintessenza. Cloudfish sold out a number of concerts including the one at Ronnie Scott's. Their song "So High" was included on the CD compilation, Dome Ibiza: The Chillout Session Vol. 2.

== Personal life ==
Norman writes a regular column reviewing CDs for the magazine Ibiza Now.

Norman's first wife was Carmen Norman De Arquero. They were married from 1990 until their divorce in 2000. Together, they have two children, a son named Jack, and a daughter named Lara.

Norman later married ex-Bucks Fizz singer Shelley Preston. The marriage ended after more than thirteen years when they divorced in 2015.

He is a fan of Tottenham Hotspur F.C.
