= Tony Hadley =

English pop/rock singer (born 1960)

Tony Hadley MBE
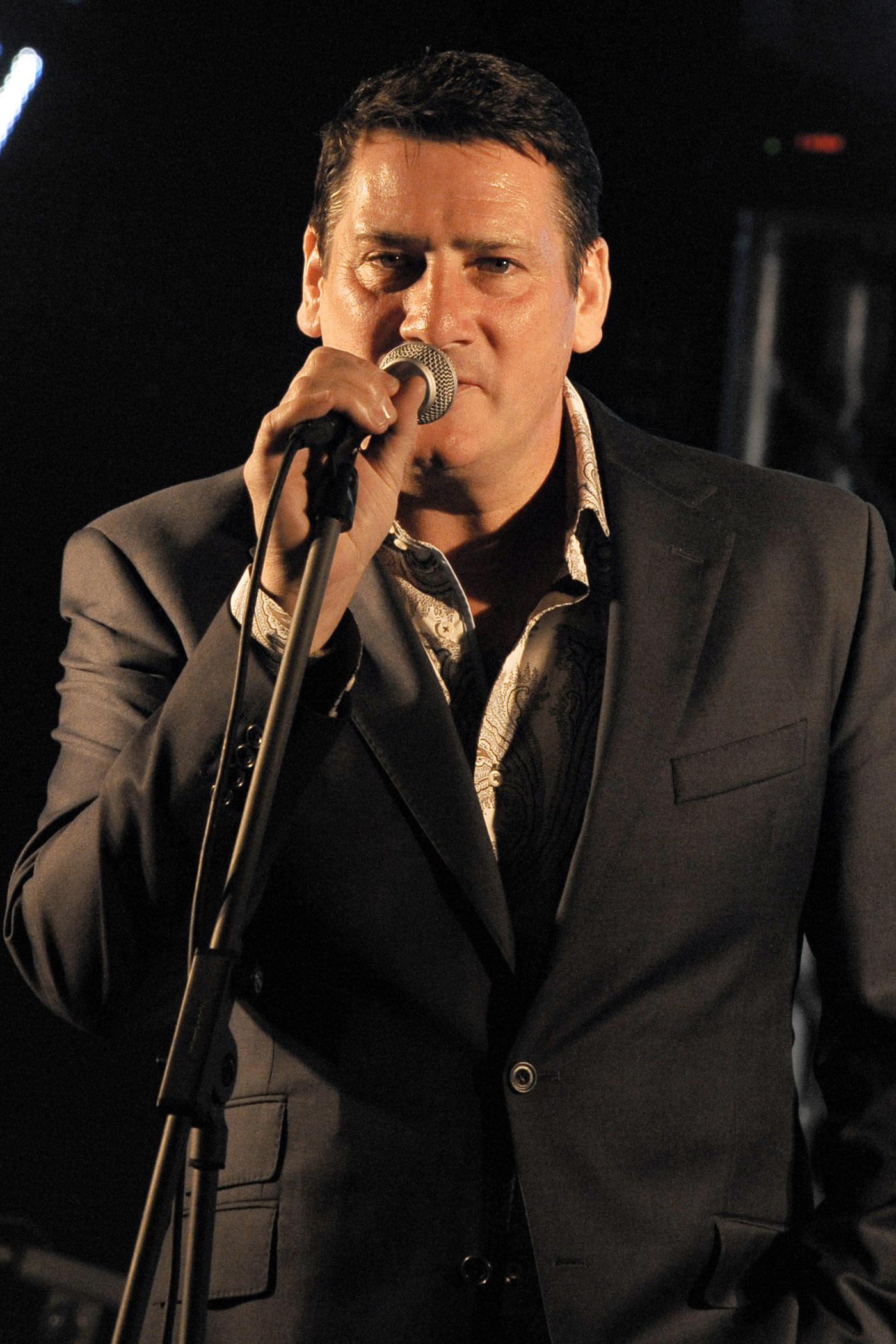
- Hadley performing in Italy, in 2012
- Born: Anthony Patrick Hadley; 2 June 1960 (age 66); Islington, London, England
- Occupation: Singer
- Years active: 1976–present
- Spouses: Leonie Lawson (m. 1983; div. 2003); Alison Evers (m. 2009)
- Children: 5
- Musical career
- Genres: Blue-eyed soul; pop; new wave
- Instruments: Vocals; keyboards; percussion
- Labels: SlipStream; PolyGram; EMI; CBS; Sony BMG; Chrysalis; Parlophone
- Formerly of: Spandau Ballet
- Website: www.tonyhadley.com

Anthony Patrick Hadley (born 2 June 1960) is an English pop singer. He rose to fame in the 1980s as the lead singer of the new wave band Spandau Ballet and launched a solo career following the group's split in 1990. Hadley returned to the band in 2009 but left again in 2017, and has since toured regularly as a solo artist. Hadley has been noted for his expressive voice and vocal range.

During his tenure with Spandau Ballet, Hadley performed on numerous UK top-ten hits, including "True", "Gold" and "Through the Barricades". He also performed on the 1984 Band Aid single "Do They Know It's Christmas?". Following the band's initial split in 1990, Hadley pursued a solo career. He has since released several studio albums, including The State of Play (1992) and Talking to the Moon (2018). His career has also encompassed musical theatre, such as a residency as Billy Flynn in Chicago.

In 2017, Hadley announced his permanent departure from Spandau Ballet to focus on his solo work. He continues to record and tour as of 2026, frequently performing with his own band and orchestral ensembles. In recognition of his contributions to music and his work with charities such as the Shooting Star Children's Hospice, Hadley was appointed a Member of the Order of the British Empire (MBE) in 2019.

== Early life ==
Anthony Patrick Hadley was born on 2 June 1960 at the Royal Free Hospital, Hampstead, North London. He is the eldest of three children, with a sister, Lee, and a brother, Steve. His father, Patrick Hadley, worked as an electrical engineer for the Daily Mail, and his mother, Josephine, worked for the local health authority. Hadley grew up listening to artists such as Queen, Roxy Music, Marc Bolan, Rod Stewart, Elton John and Be-Bop Deluxe, while his parents introduced him to artists such as Frank Sinatra, Jack Jones, Tony Bennett, Ella Fitzgerald and Johnny Mathis.

== Spandau Ballet ==
Hadley co-founded Spandau Ballet in 1976 as the Cut, with Gary Kemp, Steve Norman, John Keeble and Michael Ellison, all of whom were students at Dame Alice Owen's Grammar School. As a member of Spandau Ballet, Hadley went on to enjoy international success in the 1980s, including hits such as "True", "Gold" and "Through the Barricades" The band have had eight UK top 10 albums, including three greatest hits compilations and an album of re-recorded material.

Spandau Ballet were the first act to be approached by Bob Geldof to join the original Band Aid lineup. Hadley performed on the original 1984 Band Aid recording of "Do They Know It's Christmas?", singing his lines fifth, after Paul Young, Boy George, George Michael and Simon Le Bon. The song became the UK Christmas number one. Hadley and the other members of Spandau Ballet later performed at Live Aid in 1985.

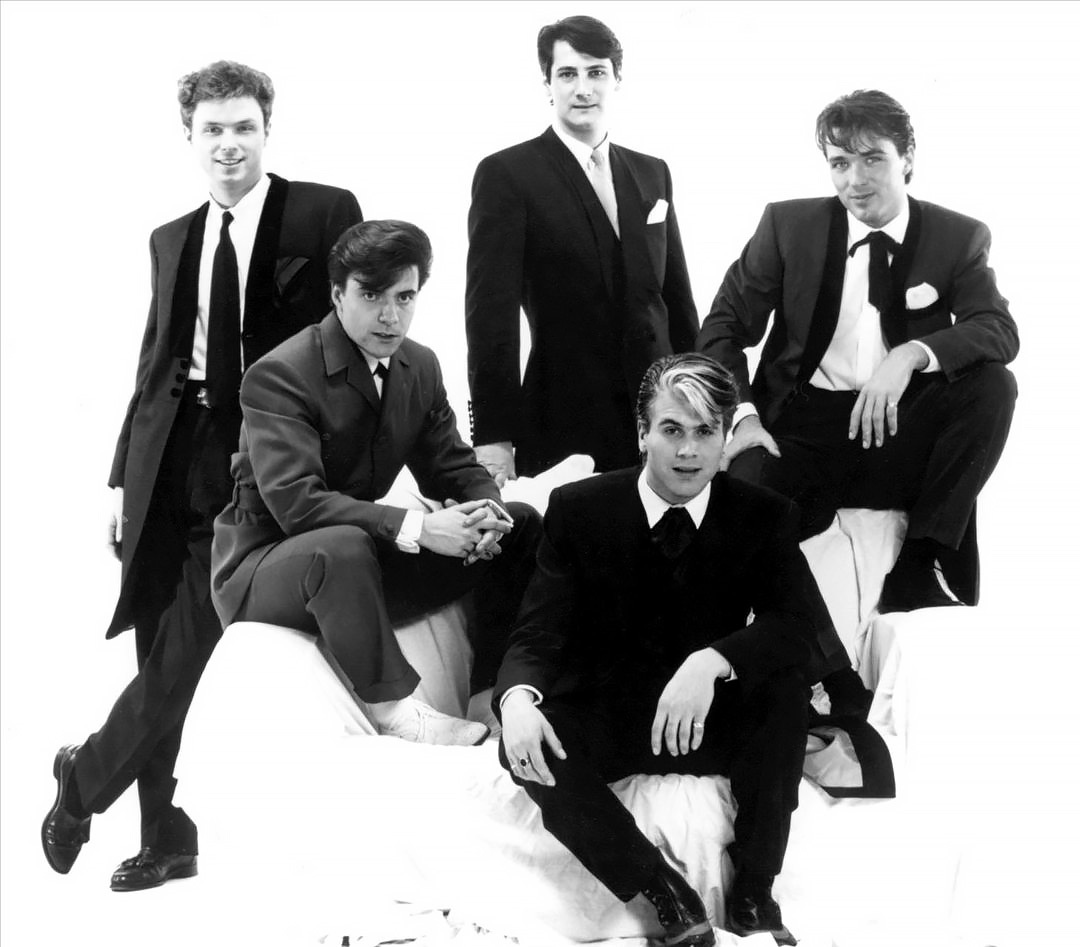
Hadley (top middle) with Spandau Ballet in 1983

As the lead singer of Spandau Ballet, Hadley became known for his suave image, as well as his powerful voice, which was described by AllMusic as a "dramatic warble". In his book on the New Romantics, music journalist and author Dave Rimmer described his voice "like a foghorn—if a foghorn could be imagined trying to emulate both [Frank] Sinatra and [David] Bowie". His Spandau Ballet bandmate Steve Norman described him as having "a massive vocal range". According to Tim Rice, Hadley had a "strong and expressive voice that few of his contemporaries came near to matching".

In 1990, the band played their last live show before a 19-year absence. In April 1999, Hadley, along with fellow band members Steve Norman and John Keeble, failed in their attempt to sue Gary Kemp, the band's songwriter, for a share of his royalties. On 25 March 2009, it was confirmed that the band had re-formed with Hadley and were embarking on a tour of the UK and Ireland in October 2009. Hadley remained a member of the band intermittently until 2017, when he announced his permanent departure. He later said in 2020: "I'd rather be happy on my own than be in that band again."

== Solo career ==
=== 1992–1996: The State of Play and When Saturday Comes ===
After Spandau Ballet disbanded, Hadley pursued a solo career, signing to EMI and recording his first album, The State of Play, in 1992. The album spawned three singles, but neither it nor any of the singles achieved any kind of chart success, and after one final single, Absolution, released in the summer of 1993, Hadley was subsequently dropped. After leaving EMI, Hadley formed his own record company, SlipStream Records, and his first release was the single "Build Me Up", from the soundtrack of the film When Saturday Comes.

In 1996, Hadley performed in a BBC Radio 2 live performance of Jesus Christ Superstar, playing the title role opposite Roger Daltrey's Judas.

=== 1997–2000: Tony Hadley and collaborations ===
On his return from that tour, Hadley collaborated with Tin Tin Out on their hit "Dance With Me", which reached #35 on the UK singles chart, and was the first in a series of electronic, dance and house collaborations over the course of the next three years. In May 1997, Hadley signed a joint deal with PolyGram TV, and released his next eponymous solo album, which included covers and songs that were chosen to match his voice. The album also featured some of his own self-penned songs, such as "She", which he wrote for daughter Toni. The album spawned three singles, but none charted and the album only reached number 45 in the UK.

In 1999, Alan Parsons chose Hadley as the lead singer for the track "Out of the Blue" on his album The Time Machine.

=== 2000–2002: Unreleased house album ===
Following a number of successful collaborations with other house artists and DJs, Hadley became the subject of some newfound respect in the 2000s, rooted in an "ironic" appreciation for Spandau Ballet. This saw him begin work on album of solo euro-house material, which remains unreleased, after signing a deal with European label Frontera Recordings. Two singles from the project were released to markets in continental Europe, with Will U Take Me being released in November 2000 and Sweet Surrender in March 2002, neither of which sparked enough interest for the album to be released.

Back on home soil, fearing that the project was too far removed from his origins with Spandau Ballet, Hadley released an EP of four new songs, Get So Lonely, on his own label, Blueprint Recordings, in the summer of 2001. Meanwhile, Debut and Obsession, two live albums featuring recordings taken from a performance in Cologne in 1992 and Ronnie Scott's in 1999 respectively, were released in limited numbers by small-budget labels. The summer of 2002 saw Hadley reunite with former band members John Keeble and Steve Norman for a tour entitled An Evening of Gold, under the moniker Hadley, Norman and Keeble.

=== 2003–2005: Reborn in the USA and True Ballads ===
Although a collaboration with Marc et Claude followed in April 2002, no further singles from the house album were released; and by the autumn of 2002, Hadley had signed up to participate in the new ITV reality series Reborn in the USA. Hadley beat ten other artists, including Peter Cox, Michelle Gayle, Elkie Brooks, Sonia, and Leee John, to win the prize of a recording contract with Universal Music. The resulting album was True Ballads, a compilation of three re-recorded hits from the Spandau Ballet days, ten tracks from his 1997 self-titled album, and two new songs: a cover of "I Can't Make You Love Me", which he performed on the show, and "After All This Time", the theme song from the BBC drama series Down to Earth, which ran from 2000 until 2005.

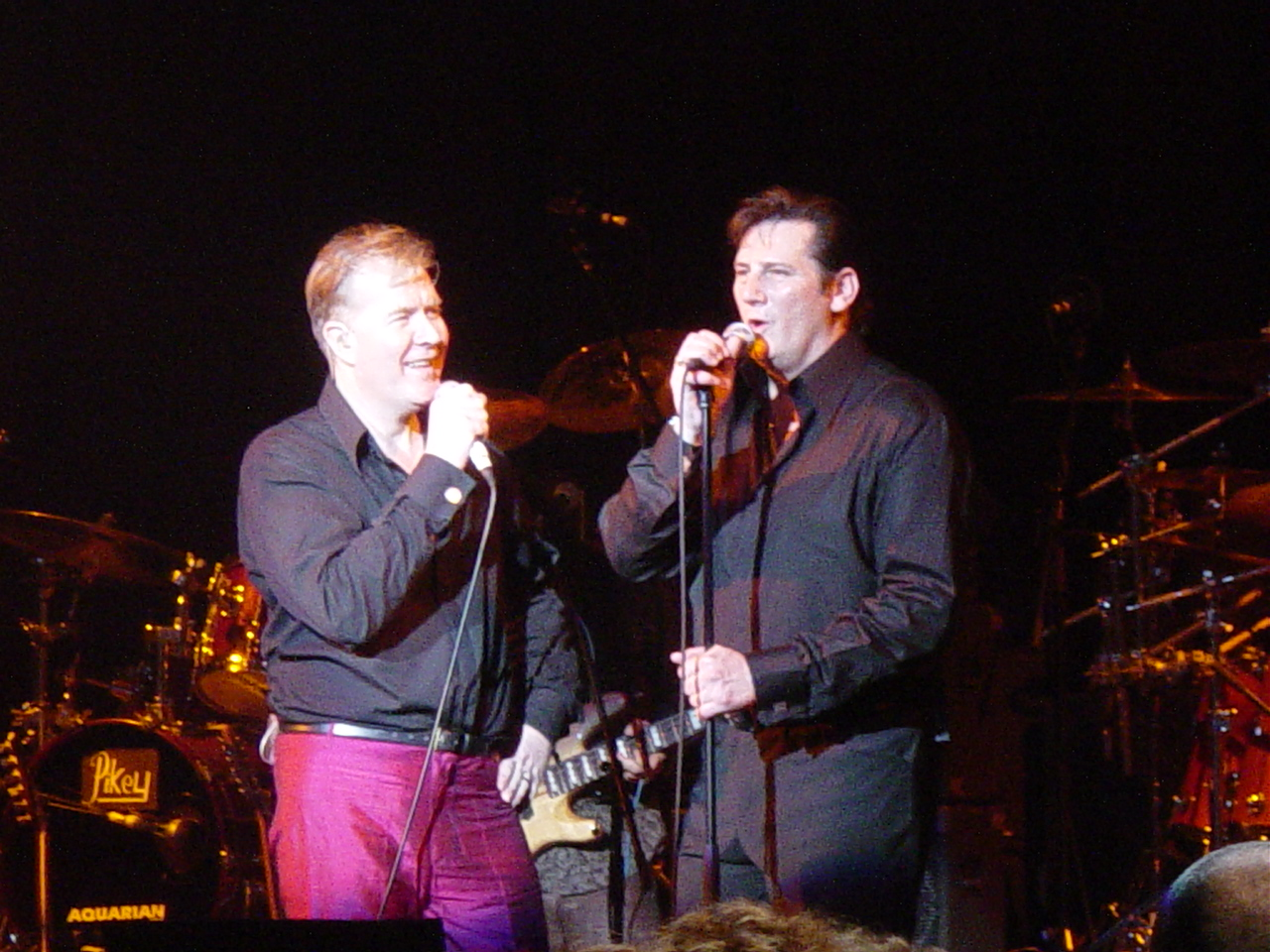
Hadley (right) performing with Martin Fry in 2005

Following his success on the show, Hadley continued with a busy performing schedule, and co-headlined a tour with Cox, performing songs from both the Go West and Spandau Ballet back catalogues, as well as number of covers. The tour spawned a live album and DVD, both of which were released in 2004. The following year, Hadley co-headlined another tour, this time with Martin Fry of ABC, in very much the same vein; performing both ABC and Spandau Ballet songs. A live album and DVD of this tour was released in 2005.

=== 2006–2008: Passing Strangers ===
2006 saw the release of Hadley's first solo album in nine years, a jazz-swing album entitled Passing Strangers. The album consisted of eighteen tracks, both covers and original songs, and was laid out in the format of a vinyl album, described by Hadley as being a "nod" to the good old days. In support of the album, Hadley headlined a "By Request" tour from March to May 2006, followed by a big band tour later in the year.

Hadley performed a set with several other 1980s acts at the Retro Fest on 1 September 2007 at Culzean Castle in Ayrshire, Scotland, which saw him reunite with Fry and Cox for a special rendition of "Addicted to Love", with Fry and Cox.

In February 2008, Hadley took part in the Italian Sanremo Festival, where he duetted in both English and Italian with contestant Paolo Meneguzzi on Meneguzzi's song, "Grande" ("Big"), during the third day of the contest, where all contestants re-interpreted their songs with guest artists. On 22 February 2008, he performed as an interval act at the semi-final of Dora 2008, the selection of the Croatian entry for the Eurovision Song Contest. By the summer of 2008, rumours of a Spandau Ballet reunion had reached the press and in the summer of 2009, a reunion tour with the original line-up was announced.

=== 2011–2014: Spandau Ballet hiatus ===
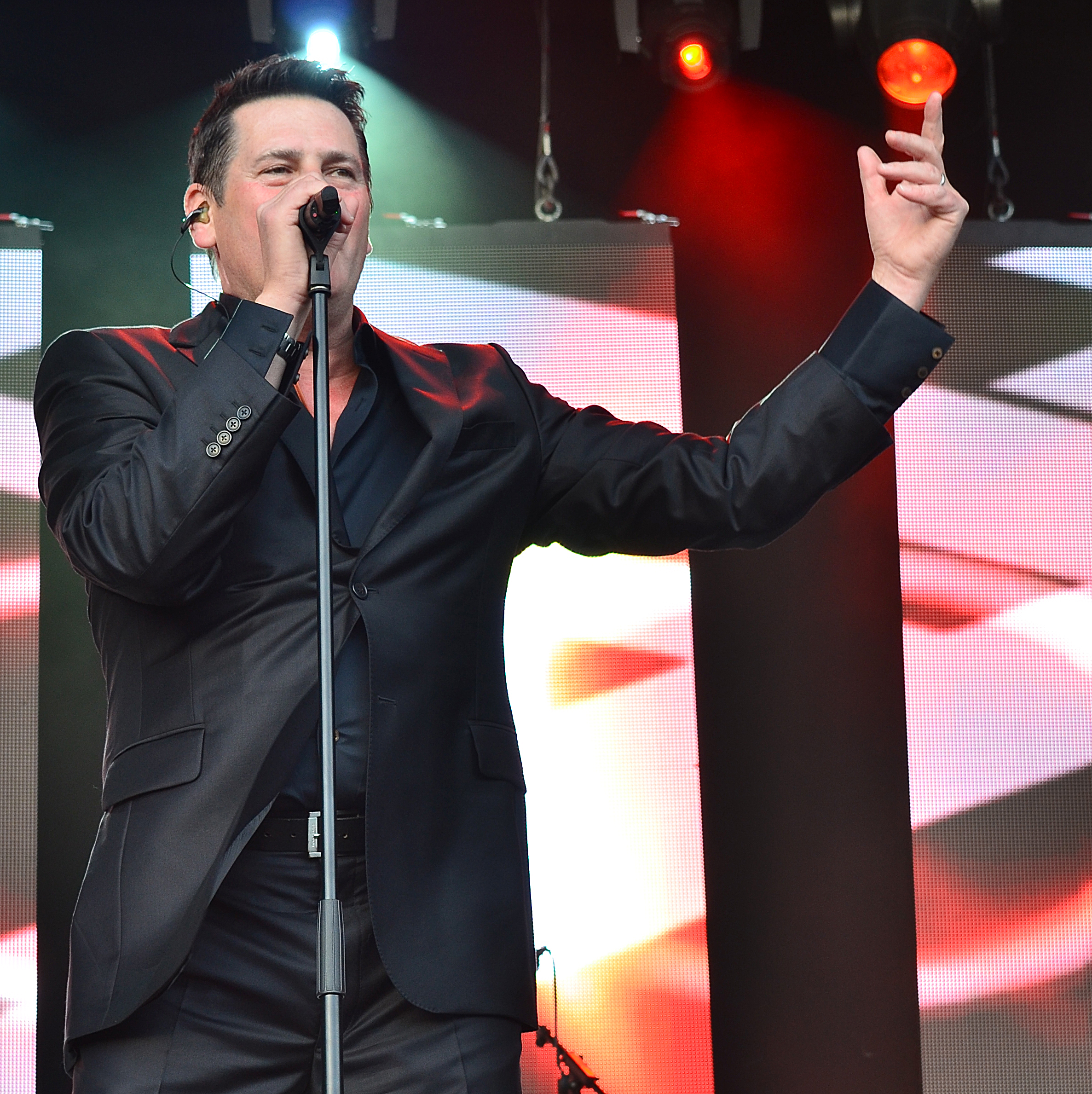
Hadley performing in 2014

After two successful years touring, Spandau Ballet once again entered hiatus in June 2010. In 2011, Hadley stated that his solo career has been more financially rewarding than his period at the top of the charts with Spandau Ballet. He stated that 2008 was his best-ever earning year, having performed in over 220 shows. In 2012, Hadley recorded a career-spanning set of hits from Metropolis Studios, which was released in a limited edition CD/DVD box set the following year. In 2013, Hadley and 1980s chart peers Kim Wilde, Bananarama and Go West set a new world record for Comic Relief when they performed the highest ever gig, singing on a Boeing 767 aeroplane at 43,000 ft (13,000 m).

In 2014, Hadley took part in the prime-time RAI TV show La Pista as team leader of the Tacco 10 female dance troupe. Over the course of the competition, Hadley performed both Spandau Ballet's "Gold", as well as "Rio", originally a hit for rival band Duran Duran. The summer of 2014 saw the release of a new solo single, "Take Back Everything", before a further tour with Spandau Ballet to celebrate the band's 35th Anniversary was confirmed for the summer of 2015. Although recorded several years before, an unreleased album of Christmas songs was released on 27 November 2015, shortly after the conclusion of the tour.

=== 2017–2021: Talking to the Moon ===
On 3 July 2017, Hadley announced on Twitter that due to circumstances beyond his control, he was no longer a member of Spandau Ballet. Towards the end of 2017, Hadley duetted with Jane McDonald on the song "I See It in Your Eyes", from her album Hold the Covers Back. Talking to the Moon, Hadley's first album of original solo material since Passing Strangers, was released in the summer of 2018, backed by the single "Tonight Belongs to Us", and also including "Take Back Everything", despite it having been released four years earlier. A tour in support of the album followed in the autumn. Subsequently, work on a follow-up album began in early 2020, with "Obvious", the first single recorded for the project, being released on 12 June.

Later in the year, Hadley was one of the featured vocalists on the single "The Best Christmas (in Lockdown)", a charity assemble of around one-hundred celebrities recording for the Hertfordshire-based Electric Umbrella organisation. In 2021, Hadley appeared alongside Marcella Detroit, Jools Holland and Glen Matlock on a charity version of the Robbie Williams song "Angels", recorded in tribute to the producer Steve Brown and with funds going to the late producer's COVID-19 charity.

=== 2022–present: 40th Anniversary Tour ===
On 18 February 2022, Hadley released his first solo single in over two years, "Because of You", an up-tempo number that marked a distinct change in his sound from previous solo material. During March and May 2022, Hadley embarked on a 40-date tour of the United Kingdom to celebrate his 40th Anniversary in the music business. The tour was scheduled for 2020, but was delayed due to the COVID-19 pandemic. The tour concluded with four special additional dates in October 2022, which saw Hadley backed by a full orchestra.

== Other work and awards ==
In 1991, Hadley made a cameo appearance in the music video for the American hip hop act P.M. Dawn's song "Set Adrift on Memory Bliss", which sampled the Spandau Ballet song "True".

Hadley worked as a radio presenter with Virgin Radio, taking over the Friday Night Virgin Party Classics show from Suggs (of the band Madness) in August 2007. In January 2008, he was given the Saturday Night Virgin Party Classics show as well. He left both shows in September 2008. In 2015, he was listed as a presenter for Absolute Radio and presented Tony Hadley's 80's Party on a Saturday night from 6.00 – 8.00pm on Absolute 80s until December 2019.

Hadley appeared, sang and gave advice in Pinoy Dream Academy, a singing reality show in the Philippines. He also appeared in RocKwiz, an Australian TV programme that aired in November 2008.

Hadley also appeared in the British short movie Shoot The DJ, in which he plays Eddie Richards. The film also featured Hadley's daughter, Toni.

Hadley took part in the 2015 series of I'm a Celebrity...Get Me Out of Here!, beginning on 10 November 2015. He was eliminated on 4 December, finishing in sixth place.

In 2019, Hadley started presenting the Sunday Mid Morning Show on BBC Three Counties Radio. He also performed alongside Arisa in the fourth show of the Sanremo Music Festival 2019.

Hadley is a patron of the UK Huntington's Disease Association, Shooting Star Chase and The Lowe Syndrome Trust. In December 2019 it was announced that he had been awarded an MBE in the New Year Honours for charitable services to Shooting Star Chase Children's Hospice Care.

In 2022 he presented his last regular show for BBC Three Counties Radio.

On 13 January 2024, Hadley performed two songs as the "Unexpected Star" in Michael McIntyre's Big Game Show for BBC One.

== Personal life ==
Hadley has three children with his first wife, Leonie Lawson; Tom, Toni and Mackenzie. Hadley split from Lawson in 2003, after 20 years of marriage, and married Alison Evers in July 2009 at Cliveden House. They live in Buckinghamshire with their two children: Zara (born 21 December 2006) and Genevieve (born 6 February 2012).

Hadley is an Arsenal fan and has played for the Arsenal ex-Professional and Celebrity XI team.

Hadley stated on the television show Loose Women (22 February 2007) that he is 6 ft 4 in (193 cm) and 17 1/2 stone (111 kilograms). He is proud of his work ethic, which he states was instilled into him from a young age by his parents, and he says he has never claimed benefits.

In 2006, Hadley became a co-owner of the Red Rat Craft Brewery, which produced Hadley's Golden Ale and Hadley's Crazy Dog Stout. The business closed in 2013, after which Hadley was associated with The Great Yorkshire Brewery, which brewed a lager called "Gold".

Hadley is a close friend of Paul Young, who appeared alongside Hadley on "Do They Know It's Christmas?". The two toured Australia and New Zealand during October and November 2008.

=== Political affiliations ===
Hadley is a supporter of the Conservative Party and an admirer of former prime minister Margaret Thatcher. He has attended the party's annual conference and was reported in 2008 to be interested in standing as an MP. In 2012 the New Statesman described Hadley as one of the few openly right-wing rock stars.

== Discography ==
=== Studio ===
- The State of Play (1992)
- Tony Hadley (1997)
- Passing Strangers (2006)
- The Christmas Album (2015)
- Talking to the Moon (2018)
- The Mood I’m In (2024)
- If I Can Dream (2025)

=== Live ===
- Debut (2000; re-released 2003)
- Obsession: Live at Ronnie Scott's (2001; also re-released as Dance With Me and Tony Hadley: Reborn)
- Tony Hadley vs. Peter Cox & Go West (2004)
- Tony Hadley vs. Martin Fry & ABC (2005)
- Hadley, Norman & Keeble: An Evening of Gold (2009)
- Live from Metropolis Studios (2013)

=== EPs ===
- Get So Lonely (2001)

=== Singles ===
Title	Release date	Peak chart positions	Album
Title	Release date	UK	Album
"Lost in Your Love"	24 February 1992	42	The State of Play
"For Your Blue Eyes Only"	17 August 1992	67	The State of Play
"The Game of Love"	4 January 1993	72	The State of Play
"Absolution"	9 August 1993	86	Non-album single
"Build Me Up"	11 March 1996	89	When Saturday Comes soundtrack
"Dance with Me" (Tin Tin Out featuring Tony Hadley)	28 April 1997	35	Always
"Separate Lives" (Erikah Karst featuring Tony Hadley)	1997	–	Non-album single
"First of May"	10 November 1997	–	Tony Hadley
"Dance with Me"	16 February 1998	–	Tony Hadley
"Save a Prayer"	April 1998	–	Tony Hadley
"Out of the Blue" (Alan Parsons featuring Tony Hadley)	1999	–	The Time Machine
"Will U Take Me"	November 2000	–	Non-album singles
"Get So Lonely"	July 2001	–	Non-album singles
"Sweet Surrender"	March 2002	–	Non-album singles
"Feel You" (Marc et Claude featuring Tony Hadley)	1 April 2002	–	You Own the Sound
"I Can't Make You Love Me" / "After All This Time"	September 2003	–	True Ballads
"The Mood I'm In"	November 2006	–	Passing Strangers
"Wives & Lovers"	January 2007	–	Passing Strangers
"The Good Life"	30 April 2007	–	Passing Strangers
"Goodbye Malinconia" (Caparezza featuring Tony Hadley)	28 January 2011	–	Il sogno eretico
"Take Back Everything"	14 August 2014	–	Talking to the Moon
"Tonight Belongs to Us"	1 May 2018	–	Talking to the Moon
"Obvious"	12 June 2020	–	Non-album singles
"Because of You"	18 February 2022	–	Non-album singles
"—" denotes a recording that did not chart or was not released in that territory.

=== Music videos ===
Year	Title	Album
1992	"Lost in Your Love"	The State of Play
1992	"For Your Blue Eyes Only"	The State of Play
1992	"The Game of Love"	The State of Play
1993	"Absolution"	non-album
1996	"Build Me Up"	When Saturday Comes soundtrack
1998	"Save a Prayer"	Tony Hadley
2015	"Shake Up Christmas"	The Christmas Album
2015	"Santa Claus Is Coming to Town"	The Christmas Album
2015	"Have Yourself a Merry Little Christmas"	The Christmas Album
2015	"White Christmas"	The Christmas Album
2018	"Tonight Belongs to Us"	Talking to the Moon
2020	"Obvious"	non-album
2022	"Because of You"	non-album
2025	"Avenues & Alleyways" (with Tony Christie)	If I Can Dream

=== Collaborations in music videos ===
Year	Title	Other Performer	Album
1997	"Dance with Me"	Tin Tin Out	Always
2010	"Goodbye Malinconia"	Caparezza	Il sogno eretico
2023	"I Was Only Sixteen"	Il Progetto Giovani	non-album

== Literature ==
- Hadley, Tony (2005). To Cut a Long Story Short. London: Pan. ISBN 0-330-42741-5.
- Hadley, Tony (2022). My Life in Pictures. London: Omnibus Press. ISBN 978-1-913172-71-8.
