= Number One (magazine) =

British pop music magazine

- 1988 cover of Number One featuring pop group Bros
- Categories: Music, teenage
- Frequency: Weekly
- First issue: 7 May 1983
- Final issue: February 1992
- Country: United Kingdom

Number One, initially rendered as No. 1, was a British pop magazine. It ran for nine years and was aimed at a mainly teenage market.

== Overview ==
The magazine was published weekly and ran from 7 May 1983 to February 1992. It was intended as direct competition to Smash Hits, which was at its peak at the time. Although No. 1 contained fewer pages and less colour (at a similar price), the magazine claimed "our strength is our weekliness".

One of the most popular aspects was that it published the singles and albums charts every week (obviously not possible for the fortnightly Smash Hits). As the magazine was an IPC publication, it initially used the Top 75 singles & albums from its sister title, the NME. However, in 1985 it started publishing the MRIB (Media Research Information Bureau) Network Chart, as used for Independent Local Radio's Sunday chart show. From October 1990, the CIN (Gallup) Top 75 Chart was used as BBC Magazines took over the publishing of the now re-branded Number One from IPC Magazines and wanted to feature the same chart as was used on Radio 1's Sunday Top 40 show.

When Number One came to an end in 1992, it was incorporated into the BBC's Fast Forward. The magazine's demise went unannounced – the final issue carried details of the features and interviews that would appear in the next issue, but remained unpublished.

== Features ==
As well as the Charts, the magazine included interviews with pop stars of the day as well as centre pin-ups. Songwords to current pop songs were also featured. Other features were Single and album reviews, competitions and a letters page. Columnists were used in the magazine with their own pages. These were sometimes by well known people in the music industry such as producer Pete Waterman, DJ Bruno Brookes or by staff writers who went under pseudonyms.

At the end of each year, the magazine would run a reader's poll of the top pop acts of the year. These would include best group, best single and most fanciable pop star among others.

== Competition with Smash Hits ==
Unlike Smash Hits, Number One made no secret of the fact the two were in direct competition and would very often refer to said magazine as "Sm*shed Tw*ts" and other less flattering terms. The approach it took to feature writing was more personal, in that the writers would show more of their own character and were not afraid to criticise their interviewees, where Smash Hits would remain more neutral. In the end Smash Hits won out due to its higher page count and glossier appearance, while remaining at a similar price to Number One. By early 1990 Number One was selling in excess of 130,000 copies per issue, but this paled in comparison to Smash Hits' 780,000 per issue.
