= Charles Cryer Theatre =

Studio theatre in London, England

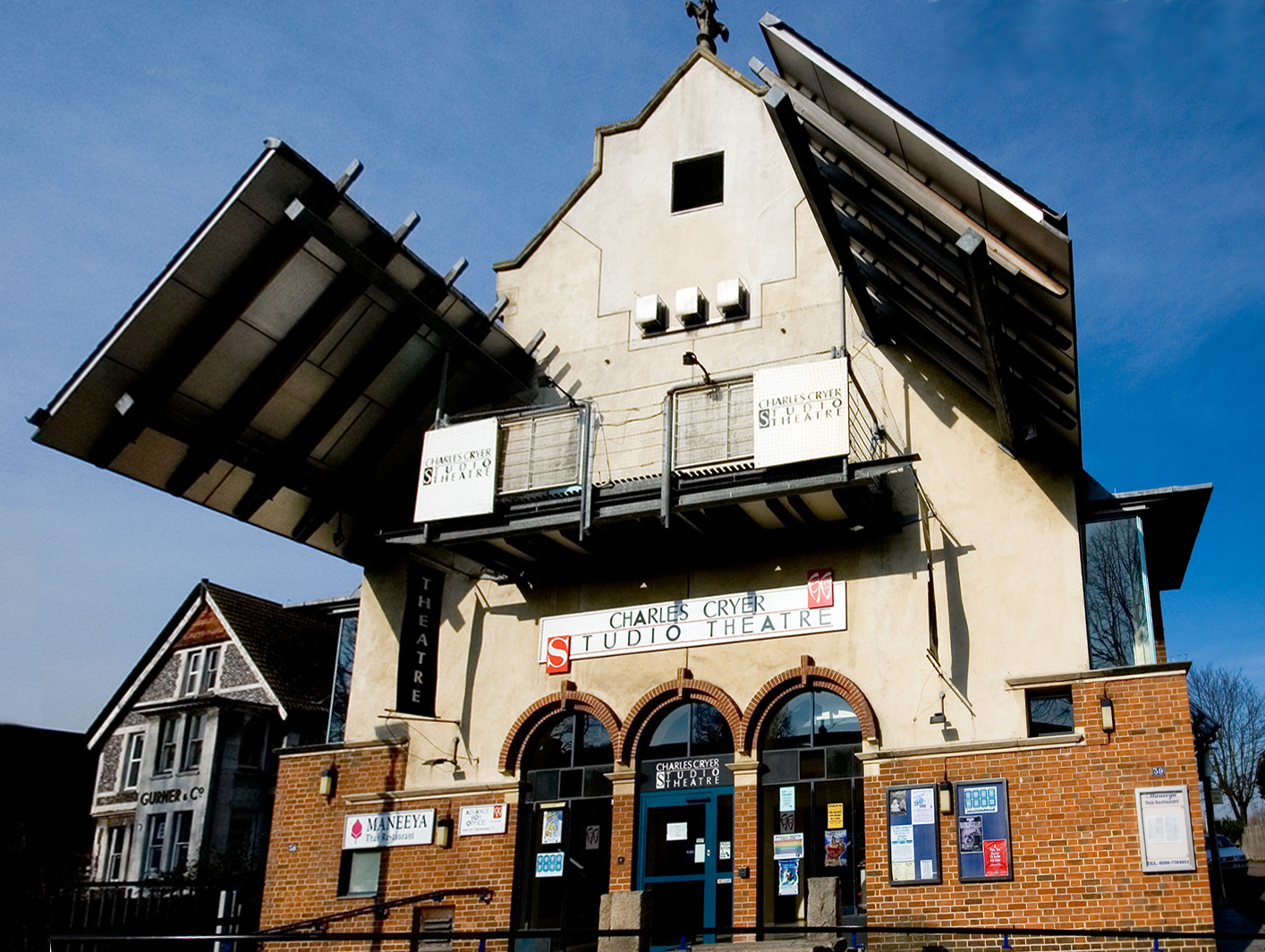
- The CryerArts Centre
- Interactive map of Charles Cryer Theatre
- Address: 39 High Street, Carshalton, SM5 3BB; London; England
- Coordinates: 51.365941°N 0.159602°W
- Owner: Sutton London Borough Council
- Operator: Sutton Theatres Trust
- Capacity: 68–125

Construction
- Opened: 1991 by HRH Prince Edward
- Architect: Edward Cullinan Architects

Website
- https://cryerarts.co.uk/

The Charles Cryer Theatre is a studio theatre located in the High Street in Carshalton in the London Borough of Sutton. The theatre is named after the man who led the campaign to open the Secombe Theatre in neighbouring Sutton. It was opened by Prince Edward in 1991. It closed in 2016, but in November 2019 it reopened under new management.

== Building ==
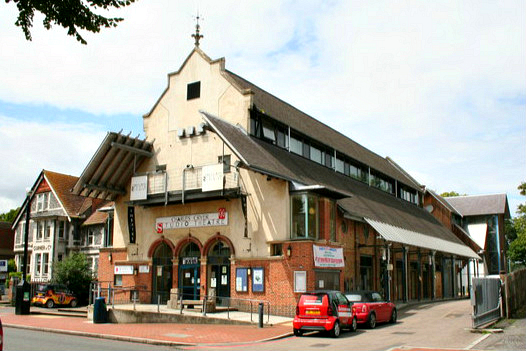
Facade and eastern flank of the building

The theatre is housed in a building which was built as a public hall in 1874 for the village. Prior to becoming a theatre it has been used as a roller skating rink (from 1900 to 1912) and a cinema (from 1912 to 1939).

To convert the building to a theatre, the roof and the facade were renewed. A stone-set wind vane and three red brick entrance arches were kept. Notable are the tiled eaves to each side of the building, which project past the front. The interior was renewed including staircases and porthole shaped windows. A new floor was designed to divide the hall in half. There is a restaurant downstairs with the box office while upstairs are the auditorium and dressing rooms. The auditorium itself features flexible seating for between 68 and 125, dependent upon the arrangement. The stage has limited space to the sides. There is a rehearsal room for performing to 20 people or less.

The 1992 RIBA Downland Design Award judges commented that "the project makes a significant social contribution to the High Street. The theatre is in constant use and well-liked".

== Productions and workshops ==
Past performances have included a "sensitive treatment by a clever director and fine cast" in 2009 of Anton Chekhov's play Uncle Vanya by the Square Peg Theatre Company, which received a five star review from the Croydon Advertiser. In 2013 the theatre hosted the Breakfast Cat Theatre Company's treatment of George Orwell's novel Nineteen Eighty-Four, which was noted by the Croydon Citizen for its "skill and flair."

Other past productions have included Steel Magnolias, The Tempest, Jesus Christ Superstar and The Witches of Eastwick.

The theatre was included by The Independent in a 1998 article entitled "The 50 Best: Britain's Best-kept Summer Secrets", which covered its drama workshops for children.

== 2014 to 2015 closure risk, rescue and renaissance ==
Because of the local council's need to make budgetary savings, the venue was, along with its sister theatre, the Secombe Theatre in Sutton, identified by the Theatres Trust as one of 33 theatres in the country for inclusion on its "At Risk" register. Comedian Tim Vine, called on Sutton Council to reconsider its proposals.

In November 2014 the local council announced that four organisations submitting outline bids to take over the two theatres had been invited to submit full business cases. In January 2015 the bid by the new "Sutton Theatres Trust" (STT) was given approval by the council's environment and neighbourhood committee to take over the theatres, thus saving them from closure. Speaking about the future running of the theatres, a spokesperson for STT said:

"...They really want to keep the theatres alive, have them work hard, supporting the community. The vision is to focus on community projects as well as classical and contemporary theatre, and big scale commercial dance and comedy events..."

In June 2015 the theatres were official handed over to the STT. Cllr Jill Whitehead said: "Now we can look forward to an exciting programme of activity to be unveiled by Sutton Theatres Trust this summer and their contribution to cultural life in Sutton."

== 2016 closure ==
In August 2016, the Sutton Theatre Trust went into administration and the theatre (along with its sister theatre in the borough) closed. The administrator began looking for a buyer for the Trust. Audience numbers had doubled under the new management, but this was still not enough for the Trust to be financially viable without additional support.

== Reopening of the theatre ==
At a meeting in October 2018, the local council announced that the theatre would be brought back into use, following a successful bid to run the venue (on a 25-year lease) by Cryer Arts Ltd. The company plans a range of events, including music, film and theatre. In November 2019 it was announced that the theatre would reopen later that month. The local councillor responsible for cultural services, Steve Cook, said: "I’m really pleased that we have completed this lease and that Cryer Arts can move forward with their plans to make the Cryer a real asset to the community and a successful business. It’s great to have a new performance and music space and this has come at a good time for our bid to be London Borough of Culture in 2023. I wish Cryer Arts every success and would encourage everyone to visit, use the restaurant and bar, see a performance or hire the theatre for their group."

== Transport ==
The theatre is on TfL bus routes 127, 157, 407, and SL7, and within walking distance of Carshalton railway station and Wallington railway station.
