= Glow (Spandau Ballet song) =

Single by Spandau Ballet
- A-side: "Muscle Bound" (double A-side)
- Released: 27 March 1981
- Recorded: 1981
- Genre: New wave
- Length: 3:48 (7-inch version); 8:10 (12-inch version)
- Label: Chrysalis; Reformation
- Songwriter: Gary Kemp
- Producer: Richard James Burgess

Spandau Ballet singles chronology
"The Freeze" (1981)	"Muscle Bound" / "Glow" (1981)	"Chant No. 1 (I Don't Need This Pressure On)" (1981)

"Glow" is a song by the English new wave band Spandau Ballet, released on 27 March 1981 in the UK as a double A-side single with "Muscle Bound". The combined single was their third consecutive top 20 hit in their native UK, reaching number 10 on the UK Singles Chart. Elsewhere, "Glow" was released as the B-side with "Muscle Bound" as the A-side. "Glow" was written while their debut album, Journeys to Glory, was in the finishing stages and was subsequently not included, but a few different versions of the song were on the 2010 reissue of the album.

== Background and recording ==
Spandau Ballet was already having success on the pop charts as they were completing their first album, Journeys to Glory, but their guitarist/songwriter Gary Kemp was worried that the LP already sounded dated. He was noticing a renewed interest in funk around Soho and wanted to get back to songwriting. In his autobiography I Know This Much: From Soho to Spandau, he recalled, "I sat with my guitar in my bedroom, and with the sound of [American disco acts] the Fatback Band and Dr. Buzzard in my head, I ground out a groove and made an attempt to write a song that combined funk with the stark European music that we had created already. The result was 'Glow'." In a May 1982 interview with New Sounds New Styles magazine, he explained how all of the songs on the first album had a "similar European flavour" and how "Glow" was their first attempt at "American style funk – but still with white lyrics".

Spandau Ballet saxophonist and percussionist Steve Norman learned to play the conga and bongos very quickly, which allowed them to get the song recorded and released as soon as possible as a way of, as Kemp put it, "announcing our credentials and proving that we were at the epicentre of Soho nightlife". The song was recorded using synthesised horns, which provided some of the inspiration for their next single, "Chant No. 1 (I Don't Need This Pressure On)".

== Release and commercial performance ==
Spandau Ballet's contract with Chrysalis Records included complete control over which songs were put out as singles, and since they had already planned for "Muscle Bound" to be one of them, they decided to include "Glow" with it on its 7- and 12-inch releases. They continued their idea of using the same motif on the cover art for both the Journeys to Glory album and singles, and Graham Smith did a cover for each song on the "Muscle Bound"/"Glow" releases, with the artwork for "Glow" on the front of the 12-inch single and the back of the 7-inch and vice versa. Smith was inspired by the works of John Flaxman for both covers.

"Glow" was issued in the UK as a double A-side single with "Muscle Bound" on 27 March 1981. The 7-inch began 10 weeks on the UK pop chart on 4 April and got as high as number 10. The extended version of "Glow" was also released as a cassette single entitled "Act I" with the same catalogue number as the vinyl releases, however side 2 contained "To Cut a Long Story Short" and "The Freeze", while "Muscle Bound" was not present. In the US, the 12-inch mix of "Glow" charted by itself on the Disco Top 100 and got as high as number 62.

The band was putting the finishing touches on Journeys to Glory when Kemp started working on "Glow", so it was not on the original 1981 album release. The 2010 CD reissue, however, included the 7- and 12-inch versions as well as a recording of the song taken from a March 1981 BBC session.

== Formats and track listings ==
- 7-inch single
1. "Muscle Bound" — 3:58
2. "Glow" — 3:48
- 12-inch single
1. "Glow" — 8:10
2. "Muscle Bound" — 4:54

== Personnel ==
Credits adapted from the liner notes for Journeys to Glory, except as noted:

- Tony Hadley – vocals, synthesizer
- John Keeble – drums
- Gary Kemp – guitar, synthesizer
- Martin Kemp – bass
- Steve Norman – bongos, conga, guitar
- Richard James Burgess – producer
- Graham Smith – graphics

== Charts ==
Chart (1981)	Peak position
UK Singles (OCC)	10
US Dance Club Songs (Billboard)	62

== Bibliography ==
- Gimarc, George (1997). Post Punk Diary, 1980–1982. New York: St. Martin's Press. ISBN 978-0-312-16968-8.
- Kemp, Gary (2009). I Know This Much: From Soho to Spandau. London: Fourth Estate. ISBN 978-0-00-732330-2.
