= Secombe Theatre =

Closed theatre in London

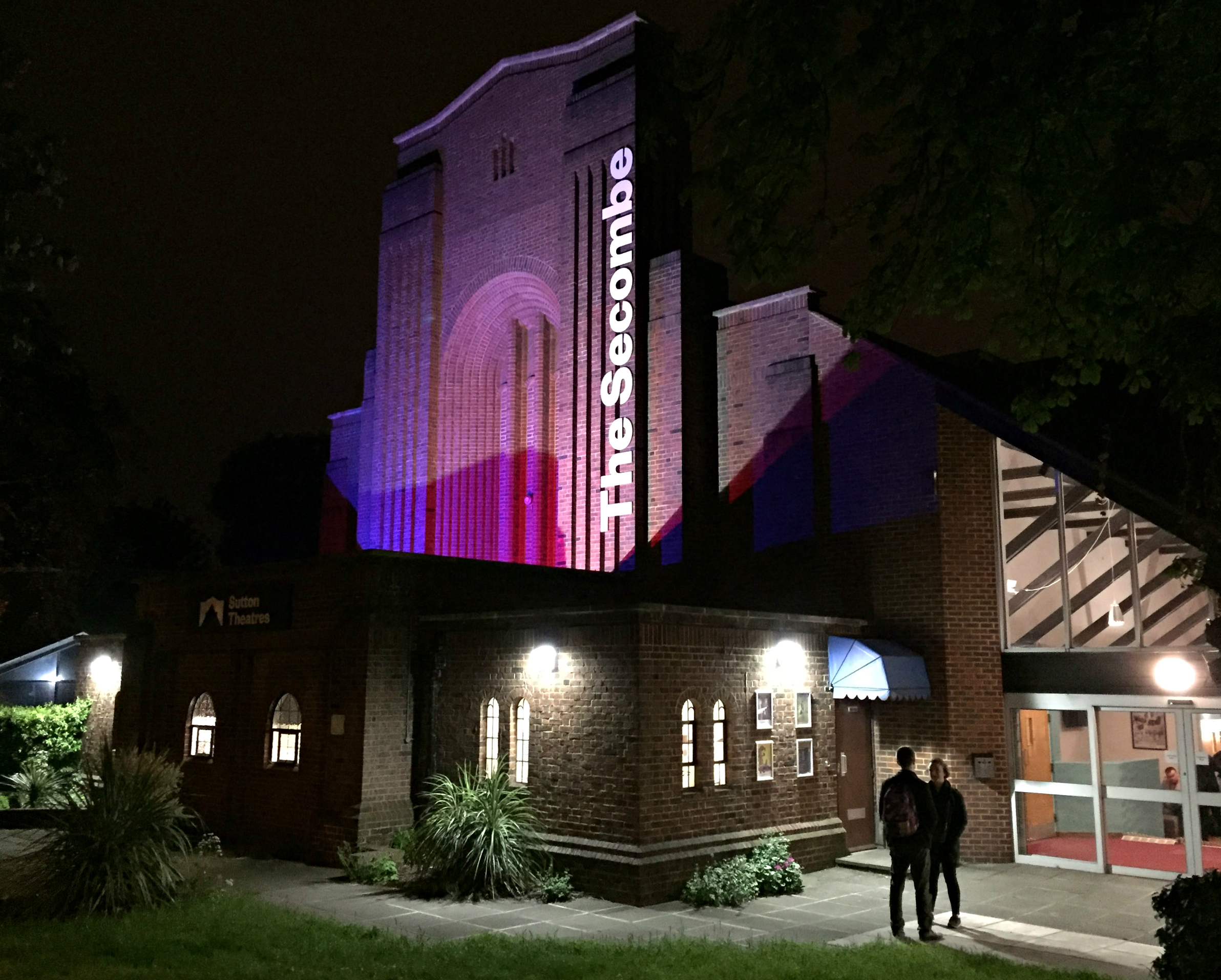
- As seen from Cheam Road 2016
- Interactive map of Secombe Theatre
- Address: 42 Cheam Rd, Sutton SM1 2SS; Greater London; England
- Coordinates: 51.361707°N 0.197146°W
- Owner: Sutton London Borough Council
- Operator: Sutton Theatres Trust
- Capacity: 343–396

Construction
- Opened: 1983
- Closed: 2016

Website
- http://www.suttontheatres.co.uk/

The Secombe Theatre (originally the Secombe Centre) was a theatre in Cheam Road, Sutton, Greater London. The theatre was opened in 1983 by the Welsh comedian Sir Harry Secombe, who lived in Sutton for over 30 years, and was named after him. The theatre went into administration and closed in August 2016. A petition to save Sutton's theatres was run in late 2016, gaining 1,350 signatures. In October 2022 Sutton Council announced its plans to sell off the Secombe Theatre “the disused Secombe Theatre - will be sold and could be used for new homes, including affordable housing.”

== Theatre building ==
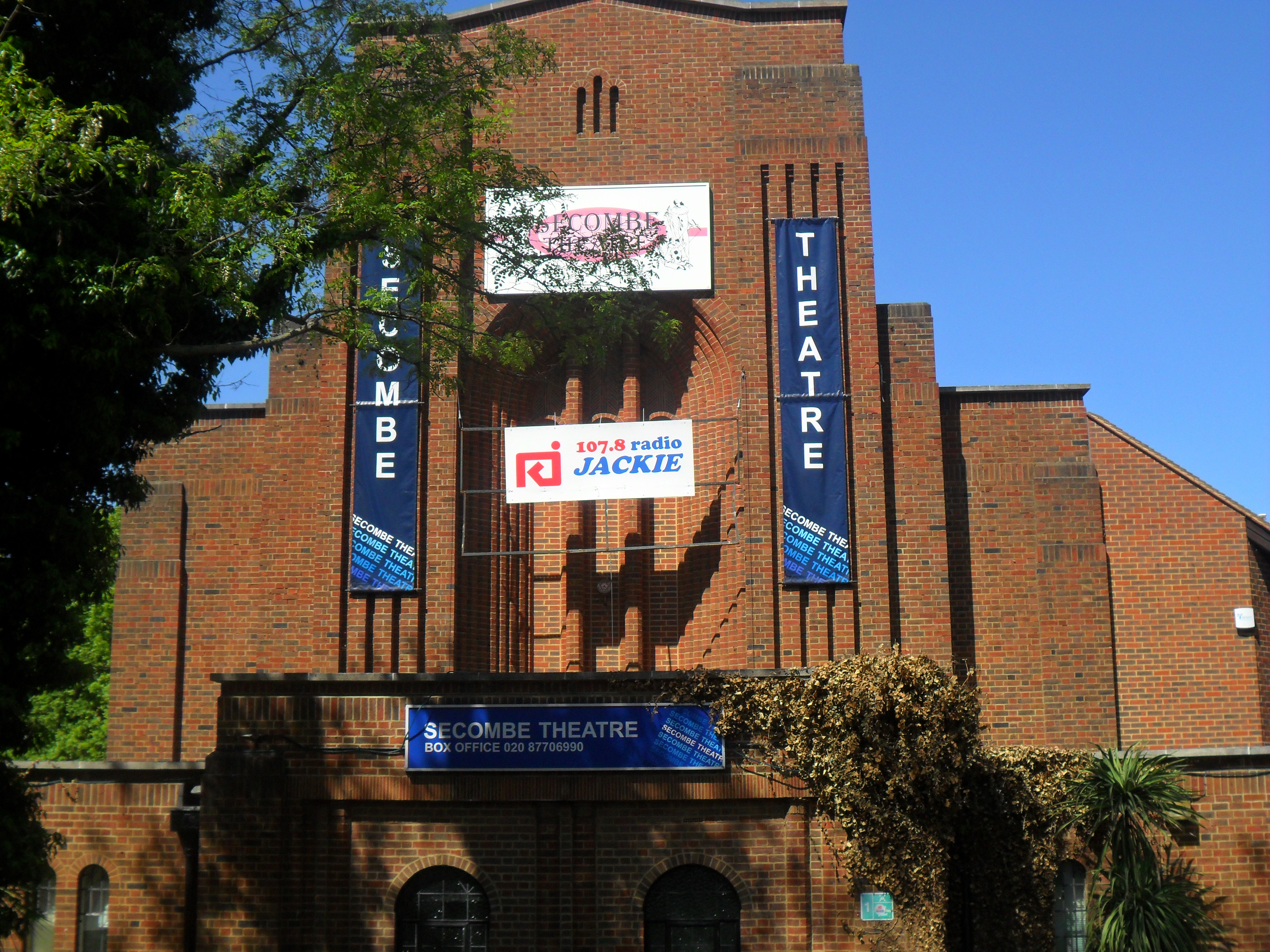
The front façade with former signage

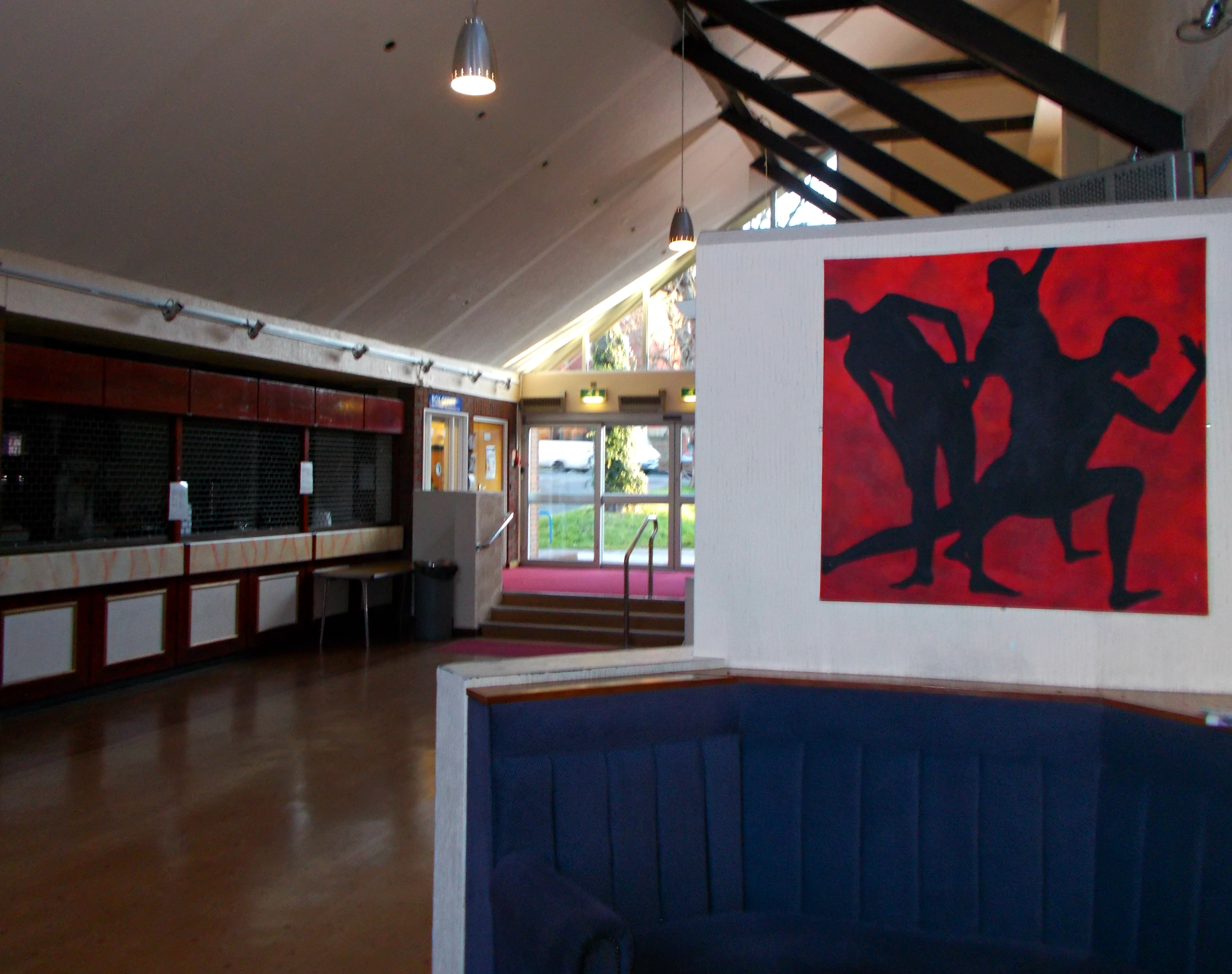
Part of the foyer of the theatre in January 2015

The theatre was created in 1983 out of a red-brick former Christian Science church on a large plot on Cheam Road at its junction with Gibson Road. The plot once formed part of an estate, and the original church building dates from 1937. The Theatre Trust describes the current building as commanding "a presence in the landscape".

The auditorium could accommodate 396 patrons, or 343 when the orchestra pit was being used, and it was tiered facing the end-on stage. The stage was a flat floor proscenium arch, and there was adequate wing space. Backstage, there were four dressing rooms (with capacities ranging from ten to twenty cast members each). Under previous managements, there was a multi-purpose room at the back of the theatre. Since taking over the theatres in June 2015, the Sutton Theatres Trust created a new 120-seat venue (180 standing capacity) in the room, complete with its own sound and lighting rig as well as a self-contained bar. It was renamed “Back Door @ The Secombe”. During the daytime, it provided an affordable rehearsal space. A large glass extension to the east side of the original building provided a bar and refreshment area, which was also open to the general public.

== Productions and events ==
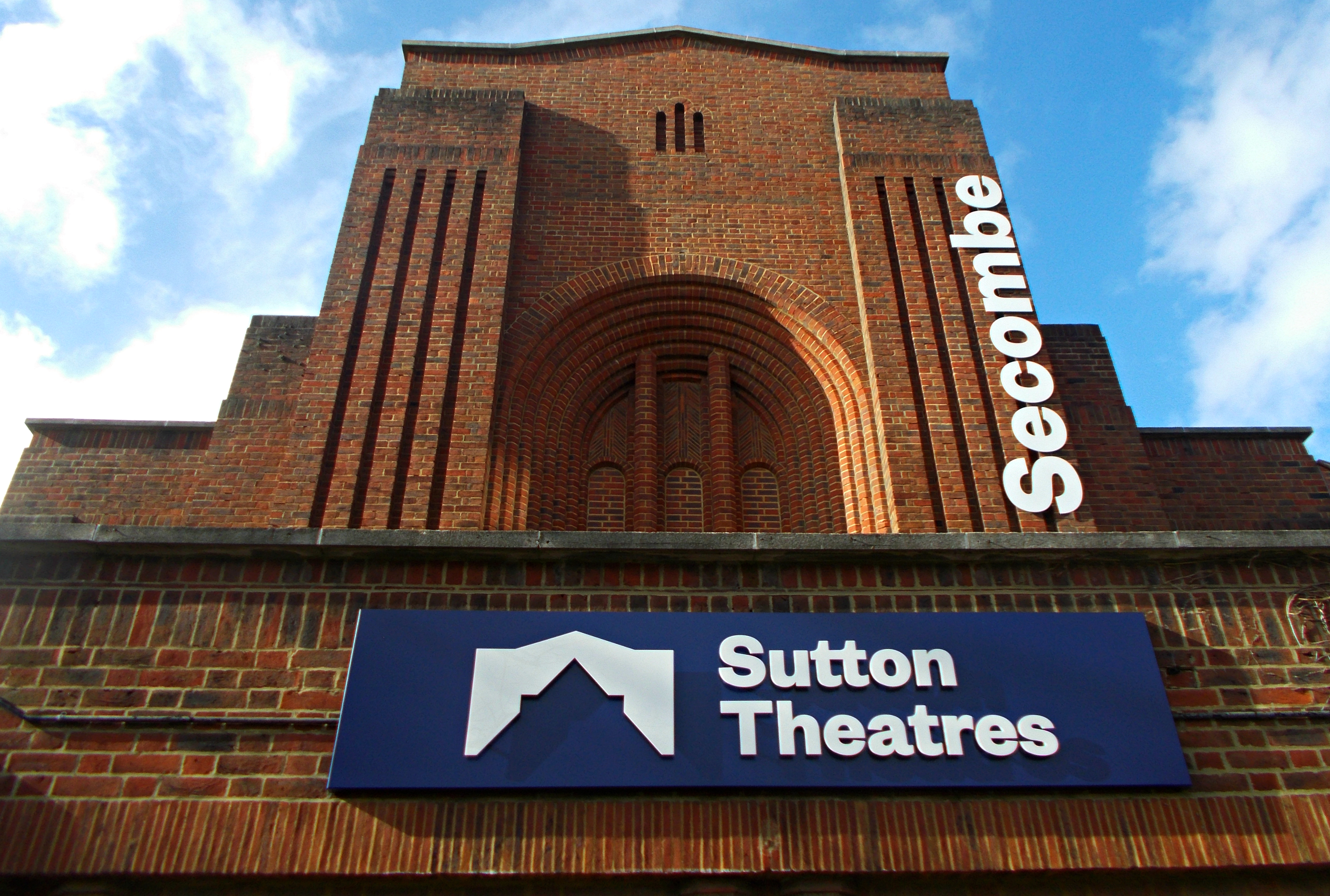
Looking up at the theatre's new signage

Productions at the Secombe included both modern productions and old, established plays given new twists. Since June 2015, it has become both a producing house and a receiving house. It produced two to three in-house productions a year, include a pantomime, and co-produced with theatres nationally and internationally. It attracted headline comedians and provided space for local community groups. The theatre also hosted conference events.

Past productions have included Steel Magnolias, The Tempest, Journey's End, and Accidental Death of an Anarchist. In a 2009 review of Souwest 09, the Croydon Advertiser awarded the performance four stars, and described it as "visually vibrant".

The world première of the Edward Bond play, Dea, was staged in 2016. Bond is said to have an "uneasy relationship with the theatre establishment", feeling that engaging people's intellect is no longer a priority for it. It was this that led to his decision to choose Sutton over the West End for the staging of the play. He said: “I would like to create something here which you couldn’t do in the West End, you couldn’t do at the Royal Court, you couldn't do at the RSC – and I know because I worked at these places. They are all part of the entertainment industry."

== Former operation of the theatre ==
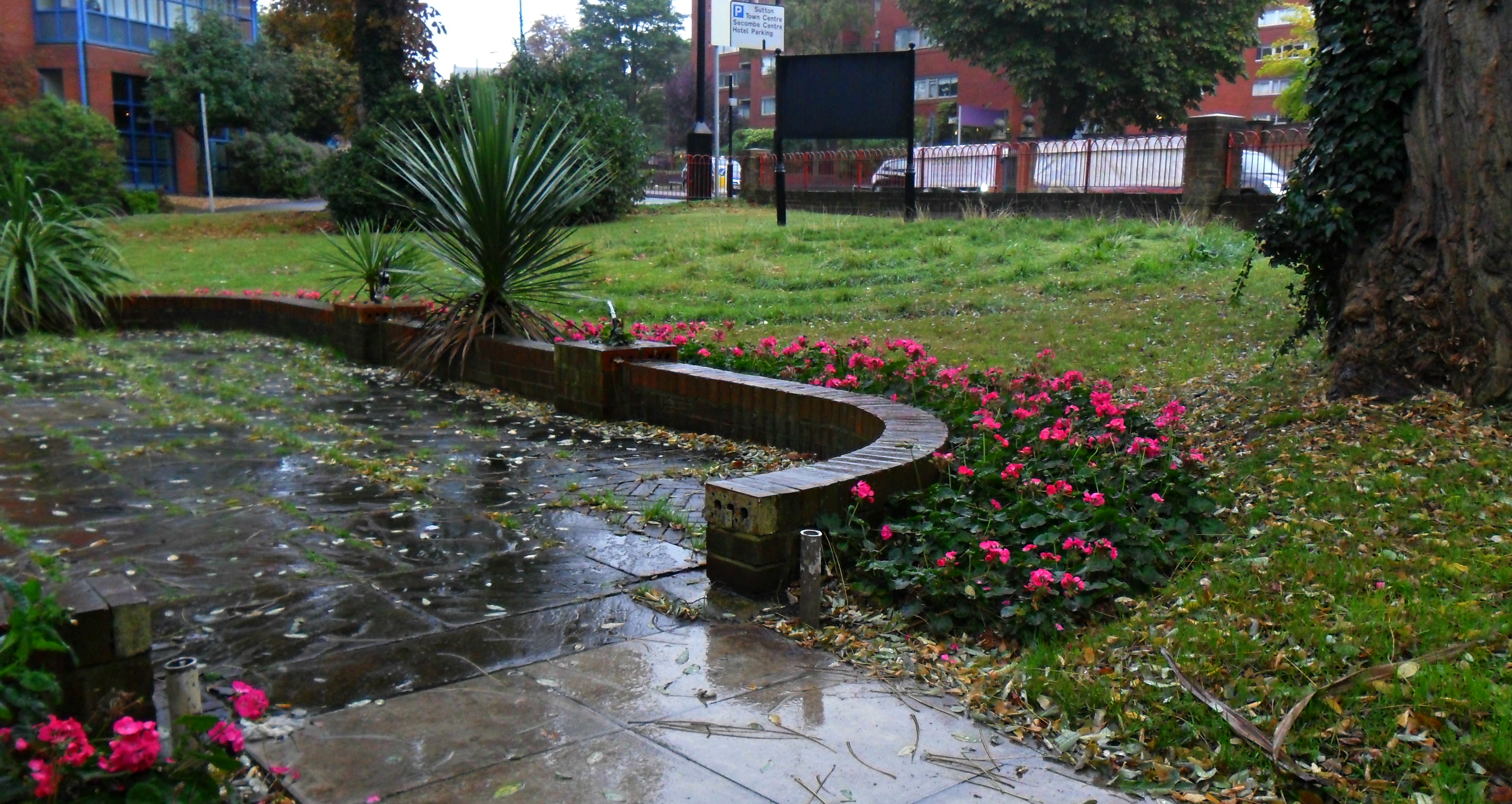
Garden in front of Secombe Theatre

The Secombe Theatre was operated together with the nearby Charles Cryer Studio Theatre, named after the campaigner for the Secombe Theatre. (The Charles Cryer Theatre is in a former hall in Carshalton, which was converted to theatre in 1991.) Financial difficulties in 2002 had put the theatre in jeopardy, but its future was believed secure the following year when it was taken over by the London Borough of Sutton and run directly by the council.

== 2014 to 2015 closure risk, rescue and renaissance ==
In 2014, because of local council budget cuts, the venue was, along with its sister theatre, the Charles Cryer Theatre in Carshalton, identified by the Theatre Trust as one of 33 theatres in the country for inclusion on its "At Risk" register. The risk of closure spurred celebrity intervention in favour of the two theatres: writer, actor, comedian and BBC presenter Tim Vine, called on Sutton Council to reconsider its proposals.

On 10 November 2014 the local council announced that four organisations submitting outline bids to take over the two theatres had been invited to submit full business cases by 12 December. The council worked with the Theatres Trust and Sutton Centre for Voluntary Services to help bidders through the bidding process. On 15 January 2015 the bid by the new "Sutton Theatres Trust" (STT) was given approval by the council's environment and neighbourhood committee to take over the theatres, thus saving them from closure. Speaking about the future running of the theatres, a spokesperson for STT said:

"...They really want to keep the theatres alive, have them work hard, supporting the community. The vision is to focus on community projects as well as classical and contemporary theatre, and big scale commercial dance and comedy events..."

In June 2015 the theatres were official handed over to the STT. Cllr Jill Whitehead said:

"Now we can look forward to an exciting programme of activity to be unveiled by Sutton Theatres Trust this summer and their contribution to cultural life in Sutton."

== August 2016 closure ==
In August 2016, the Sutton Theatre Trust went into administration and the theatre (along with its sister theatre in the borough) closed. The administrator sought a buyer for the Trust. Audience numbers had doubled under the new management, but this was still not enough for the Trust to be financially viable without additional support.

A petition to save Sutton's theatres was run in late 2016, gaining 1,350 signatures. It was discussed by the Council at a meeting in January 2017, but as of 2024 remains closed.

== Future Plans ==
In October 2022 Sutton Council announced its plans to sell off the Secombe Theatre:

“The existing Civic Centre site - which includes the council’s offices, Sutton Library, and Sutton College, as well as the Gibson Road Car Park and the disused Secombe Theatre - will be sold and could be used for new homes, including affordable housing.”

== Transport ==
Sutton mainline railway station is the nearest station. The Gibson Road car park is adjacent, and buses serve the town.
