= The Freeze (song) =

Single by Spandau Ballet

from the album Journeys to Glory
- B-side: "The Freeze" "Version" version [dub mix]
- Released: 12 January 1981
- Recorded: 1980
- Genre: Eurodisco
- Length: 3:30 (single version); 4:35 (12-inch version)
- Label: Chrysalis; Reformation
- Songwriter: Gary Kemp
- Producer: Richard James Burgess

Spandau Ballet singles chronology
"To Cut a Long Story Short" (1980)	"The Freeze" (1981)	"Muscle Bound" / "Glow" (1981)

"The Freeze" is a song by the English new wave band Spandau Ballet, released on 12 January 1981 as the follow-up to their debut single, the number 5 UK hit "To Cut a Long Story Short". As was the case with that release, the 7-inch single of "The Freeze" featured a dub mix on its B-side, and the 12-inch single had two additional mixes of the song geared toward dance clubs. The cover art used for both formats of the single also repeated its predecessor in having a simple black-and-white classical motif. This design, however, was also seen on the sets of the music video for the song. Reviews of "The Freeze" were mixed. It reached number 17 on the UK Singles Chart.

== Background and recordings ==
Spandau Ballet gained the attention of record labels eager to sign them through a television documentary that included footage from a concert attended by A&R executives, but the representative for Arista Records was unable to attend. To catch up with what he missed, he offered to pay for the recording of a demo of some of their songs, so on 31 August 1980 the band recorded "To Cut a Long Story Short", "The Freeze", "Confused" and "Reformation". Before they were signed they also recorded a demo of "To Cut a Long Story Short" for BBC Radio 1 DJ Peter Powell to play regularly on his show. As other DJs at the station also added that song to their playlists, the demand grew for its availability as a single to purchase, and the record labels competing to sign the band agreed that the chosen one would pay for however much studio time they had racked up to record "To Cut a Long Story Short" and start on their first album.

"The Freeze"
"The Freeze" includes "two-fingered synth arpeggios, plus enough percussive kick-drum snaps underpinned with bassline rhythms to fill dancefloors."

"To Cut a Long Story Short" became a number 5 hit on the UK Singles Chart, and "The Freeze" was selected to be released on 12 January 1981 as the next single. Puzzled by the opening line, "Blue sing la lune, sing lagoon", former Evening Standard and music magazine journalist David Johnson did not see the song as an obvious choice to follow their top 5 hit but pointed out that "'The Freeze' was not chosen for singability but for its New Romantic clubbing credibility. In 1981 the pathfinding band were consolidating the new approach they had styled White European Dance Music — led on 'The Freeze' by Gary Kemp's two-fingered synth arpeggios, plus enough percussive kick-drum snaps underpinned with bassline rhythms to fill dancefloors."

While working on "To Cut a Long Story Short", the band's guitarist/songwriter Gary Kemp reminisced with producer Richard James Burgess about the reggae dubs and remixes done by producers King Tubby and Lee "Scratch" Perry dating back to the sixties, and they used those recordings as inspiration for the remix of "To Cut a Long Story Short". One dub version of that song was put on the B-side of its 7-inch single and simply subtitled "Version" in the way those producers labeled their dub releases and a different one was on the flip side of its 12-inch dance remix. The B-side of the 7-inch single of "The Freeze" was also labeled "Version" to indicate that it was a dub track, while side two of the 12-inch was labeled "Special Mix".

== Cover art and music video ==
The same classical motif used for the cover art can be seen on the walls, floor and ceiling of the music video set.

Camberwell College of Arts graphics student Graham Smith continued the work he began with the design for the "To Cut a Long Story Short" cover where he intended all of the singles from Spandau Ballet's first album, Journeys to Glory, and the album itself to have matching art work. He said, "I wanted to create an overall corporate visual package for Spandau that was cutting edge and reflected their aspirations. It had to have style." For the cover art featured on the single for "The Freeze", he selected an image of a chariot from a reference book on Egyptian icons that he thought was symbolic of the album's title. Johnson pointed out that the classical motif that frames the chariot can also be seen on the walls of the set for the music video for the song. Shot in two rooms that are mostly bare, the video shows lead singer Tony Hadley in one room with a young woman and the other band members in the other playing their instruments. Hadley described the video as "strange… A girl lay on a sofa in a cobweb shroud. It was around this time I started to wonder about the kind of people that came up with the concepts for our videos."

== Critical reception ==
At the time of its release, Ronnie Gurr of Smash Hits was ostensibly positive, writing that the song "glides along on one of those disco bass lines and again shows a certain amount of two-fingered prowess from the keyboards." Mike Gardner of Record Mirror, however, was negative, asserting that Spandau Ballet "completely blow the favourable impression made with 'To Cut a Long Story Short' by thinking that superbly chunky dance stance drums are enough to compensate for a lack of imagination. Much as it sounds good loud, there's still an aftertaste of being somehow shortchanged." In a retrospective review for AllMusic, Dave Thompson included "The Freeze" on a list of Spandau Ballet songs that were "utterly convincing white boy Funk".

== Release and commercial performance ==
"The Freeze" debuted on the UK Singles Chart dated 24 January 1981 and reached number 17 over the course of 8 weeks. Bassist Martin Kemp found this chart performance to be "a little worrying" when comparing it to how well "To Cut a Long Story Short" had done: "All those people who congratulated you the week before are waiting for the moment when they can revel in your failure." "The Freeze" got as high as number 14 in Ireland and number 16 in Spain. In the US, Billboard magazine paired the song on the Disco Top 100 with their first hit, and eventually they got as high as number 28. In the July 2021 issue of Classic Pop magazine, Spandau Ballet's guitarist/saxophonist, Steve Norman, said, "Looking back, I’m not really surprised 'The Freeze' didn’t turn out to be as big a hit as 'To Cut a Long Story Short'. It doesn’t have a chorus, for one thing – my guitar acts as the chorus." At the same time, however, he notes, "'The Freeze' is such an arrogant song that it didn’t really need a chorus, and I like that about it. It’s from the same camp as 'To Cut a Long Story Short', of our certainty about ourselves at that time. It’s another of those songs you can only write when you’ve suddenly found a tribe of like-minded, disillusioned teenagers."

== Formats and track listings ==
- 7-inch single
1. "The Freeze" — 3:30
2. "The Freeze" ("Version" version [dub mix]) — 4:20
- 12-inch single
1. "The Freeze" — 4:35
2. "The Freeze" (Special Mix) — 6:30

== Personnel ==
Credits adapted from the liner notes for Journeys to Glory:

- Tony Hadley – vocals, synthesizer
- John Keeble – drums
- Gary Kemp – guitar, synthesizer
- Martin Kemp – bass
- Steve Norman – guitar
- Richard James Burgess – producer
- Graham Smith – graphics

== Charts ==
Chart (1981)	Peak position
Ireland (IRMA)	14
Luxembourg (Radio Luxembourg)	14
Spain (AFYVE)	16
UK Singles (OCC)	17
US Dance Club Songs (Billboard)	28

== Bibliography ==
- Gimarc, George (1997). Post Punk Diary, 1980–1982. New York: St. Martin's Press. ISBN 978-0-312-16968-8.
- Hadley, Tony (2004). To Cut a Long Story Short. London: Sidgwick & Jackson. ISBN 978-0-283-07386-1.
- Kemp, Gary (2009). I Know This Much: From Soho to Spandau. London: Fourth Estate. ISBN 978-0-00-732330-2.
- Kemp, Martin (2000). True: The Autobiography of Martin Kemp. London: Orion Publishing Group. ISBN 978-0-75-283769-7.
