= Journeys to Glory =

Studio album by Spandau Ballet
- Released: 6 March 1981
- Recorded: September – December 1980
- Studios: The Manor (Oxfordshire); Jam; Trident; Utopia (London)
- Genres: Synth-pop; disco; funk
- Length: 36:37
- Labels: Chrysalis; Reformation
- Producer: Richard James Burgess

Spandau Ballet chronology
Journeys to Glory (1981)	Diamond (1982)

Singles from Journeys to Glory
- 1. "To Cut a Long Story Short" Released: 31 October 1980; 2. "The Freeze" Released: 12 January 1981; 3. "Muscle Bound" Released: 27 March 1981

Journeys to Glory is the debut studio album by the English synth-pop band Spandau Ballet, released on 6 March 1981 by Chrysalis Records. All of the songs on the album were produced by Richard James Burgess and written by band guitarist Gary Kemp to appeal to the patrons of a weekly Tuesday night club the band started attending called the Blitz, where they were accustomed to hearing "white European dance music". Their performances at the Blitz and other exclusive venues attracted the attention of record labels eager to sign them, and one of the songs they had been performing, "To Cut a Long Story Short", gained popularity through a recording session made at BBC Radio 1.

The high demand for their music instigated the commencement of recording the album and the release of "To Cut a Long Story Short" as their first single. The song reached number 5 on the UK Singles Chart, and two subsequent hits, "The Freeze" and "Muscle Bound", peaked at 17 and 10, respectively. A music video was made to promote each of the three songs, whose success warranted appearances on the British music chart television programme Top of the Pops. The album got as high as number 5 on the UK album chart and received Gold certification from the British Phonographic Industry for shipment of 100,000 units.

The influence of David Bowie on Journeys to Glory has been discussed by Kemp as well as critics of the album, who gave it mixed reviews upon its release and years later. After their composer attempted to shift to a more American style of funk with songs like "Glow" and the first single for their next album, "Chant No. 1 (I Don't Need This Pressure On)", he remembered that the songs from Journeys to Glory had been rehearsed at concerts before they were signed to a label and had received the approval of their original fanbase. When some of the new songs for the second album did not chart as well, the band recovered by remixing a fourth single as a more pop-flavoured tune and lost the interest of the hipsters that Spandau Ballet had initially courted with the songs that were recorded for their debut. Kemp then felt freed from trying to please that crowd and began writing mainstream pop songs that were the band's biggest hits.

== Background and development ==
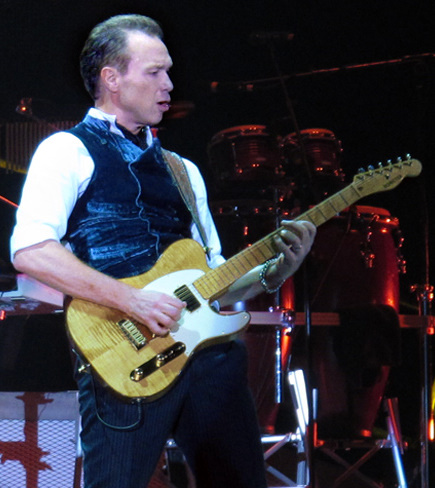
Gary Kemp wrote all of the songs on Journeys to Glory.

While still performing as the Gentry, Spandau Ballet recognized that a new London club scene was taking root at a weekly Tuesday night gathering called the Blitz and decided to focus on playing what they had become used to hearing there, what their guitarist/songwriter Gary Kemp called "white European disco music". He was committed to their new genre: "All fancy rock patterns had to go …, we'd discussed it at the club: these new songs would be to a disco beat; there would be a [discarding] of all the old power pop stuff; our future sound had to be like the one we heard every Tuesday night. If we were to attempt to be the band that represented this new cult, then we had to be absolutely ready." The band bought Kemp a Yamaha CS10 synthesiser, and he came up with what would eventually be their first hit, "To Cut a Long Story Short", which assured them that they were ready to debut with their new sound. After a preview at a rehearsal studio in November 1979 where the Gentry were renamed Spandau Ballet, the band was invited to perform at the Blitz Christmas party, but their manager Steve Dagger realized after a second Blitz show in January 1980 that they needed to play a variety of venues to generate more interest.

Steve Woolley was a friend of Dagger's who managed the Scala Cinema in Fitzrovia and was eager to be of service to this "new movement", so the band performed there on 3 March 1980. Dagger then arranged for a couple of write-ups in London newspapers and a review in the New Musical Express and soon thereafter received a phone call from London Weekend Television asking to do a documentary about the band that would include filming them in concert. Dagger decided that the band would return to the Scala for another concert that they could film, and several record companies were interested in signing Spandau Ballet after it aired but wanted a better sense of their music through either demos or rehearsals or a live performance before they would be willing to meet the band's long list of demands.

Dagger arranged a concert on HMS Belfast on 26 July that gave the labels another opportunity to see Spandau Ballet perform live, but the A&R executive for Arista Records could not attend and offered to pay for the recording of a demo of some of their songs. The band accepted his offer and recorded "To Cut a Long Story Short", "The Freeze", "Confused" and "Reformation" on 31 August. BBC Radio 1 DJ Peter Powell was interested in having recordings to play on his show after having seen them in concert, so the band recorded a studio session of four songs for him. The version of "To Cut a Long Story Short" from that set was put on the playlist for the station, and the listening audience was interested in buying it. Kemp admitted that "the song started to appear as though it were a single before we even had a record label."

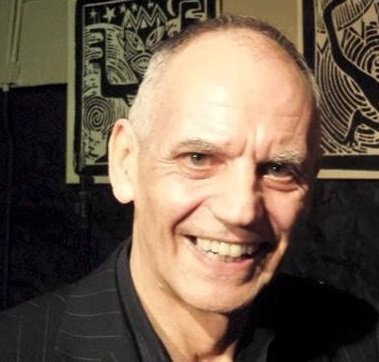
Richard James Burgess produced Journeys to Glory.

On the 40th anniversary of the release of "To Cut a Long Story Short", Spandau Ballet producer Richard James Burgess recalled, "Labels were at a fever pitch trying to sign the group." Burgess, co-founding member of Landscape, had been impressed when he saw Spandau Ballet perform at the Blitz. Kemp showed interest in Landscape's current album that he mentioned he was working on and took advantage of the opportunity to listen to some rough recordings from the project. Burgess received a call from Dagger a couple of days later asking if he wanted to be their producer. He was "ecstatic" that the band chose him, but because he had little production experience, he thought the label they would be signing with would want a big-name producer instead. Years later, appreciating that he was kept on, he said, "I was over the moon because it was obviously a great opportunity for me."

== Songs ==
Before the Gentry members began attending the Blitz in February 1979, their hangout was a similar Soho club called Billy's that they first went to in the autumn of 1978. According to Spandau Ballet's guitarist/saxophonist, Steve Norman, "The oldest song on the album, 'Confused', is the only song to survive from the period before we first went to Billy's." He described how it created a meaningful point of entry for them into the club scene: "It's the song that, when we first got to Billy's, would make you think we belonged there." Their guitarist, Martin Kemp, admitted that "Confused" was the track from the album that meant the most to him because it dates back to the period when the band was still called the Makers and he was just a roadie for them. During a two-week stint in the summer of 1980 at a club in Saint-Tropez, the band performed "Confused" along with "Age of Blows", an instrumental that Norman felt was one of the weaker cuts on the album and theorizes "was written as an excuse to test out the Yamaha CS10 and see what it could do." Norman was certain that Kemp was influenced by Bowie's "Warszawa" in writing "Age of Blows" and also hears some Bowie in "Mandolin", which he thinks is the song from the album that has aged the most. He also felt "Toys" needed to be the last song on the album since it is the only one that remotely resembles a ballad and explained, "We were never a band to front-load our albums and say, 'All the singles have to be at the start.' It's the same with our concerts not starting with the biggest hits. The shows – and our albums, right from the start – are about energy; having peaks and troughs."

=== To Cut a Long Story Short ===
In "To Cut a Long Story Short" the singer begins providing details regarding certain undesirable circumstances but concludes with, "To cut a long story short, I lost my mind". On BBC Radio 4's Mastertapes series in 2013, Kemp said, "The lyrics to those kind of songs, I mean, I suppose they owed something to Bowie's famous cut-ups, you know, slightly esoteric, this grand landscape that we're all living on. That was the kind of lyric, very early '80s lyric about a kind of heroic place that we all wanted to put ourselves." In his autobiography I Know This Much: From Soho to Spandau, he described the song as "garage-band stuff – short, to the point, and very English. With its portentous refrain of 'We are beautiful and clean and so very, very young', it seemed the perfect manifesto – or at least lyrical sound-bite – for the Blitz generation." Hadley recognized "To Cut a Long Story Short" as one of his favourite Spandau songs, and Norman told Classic Pop magazine, "If I had to pick two Spandau songs as my absolute favourites, it'd be 'Story' and 'Chant No. 1'. They're just undeniable, unstoppable." He said that "Story" reflected "our certainty about ourselves at that time" and explained that the success they had with it "wasn't just about the song or even us as a band. It was about that whole [Blitz Kids] movement…. There's something about the arrogance of youth in 'Story': you can hear that our attitude is 'We're here now, and if you don't like it, get out of the way'".

=== The Freeze ===
Puzzled by the opening line of "The Freeze", "Blue sing la lune, sing lagoon", former Evening Standard and music magazine journalist David Johnson did not see the song as an obvious choice for a single but pointed out that it "was not chosen for singability but for its New Romantic clubbing credibility. In 1981 the pathfinding band were consolidating the new approach they had styled—White European Dance Music—led on 'The Freeze' by Gary Kemp's two-fingered synth arpeggios, plus enough percussive kick-drum snaps underpinned with bassline rhythms to fill dancefloors." In the July 2021 issue of Classic Pop magazine, Norman pointed out that his guitar work on the song filled in where there were no lyrics for the chorus and said, "'The Freeze' is such an arrogant song that it didn't really need a chorus, and I like that about it. It's from the same camp as 'To Cut a Long Story Short', of our certainty about ourselves at that time. It's another of those songs you can only write when you've suddenly found a tribe of like-minded, disillusioned teenagers."

=== Muscle Bound ===
In a May 1982 interview with New Sounds New Styles magazine, Kemp was asked about working with Graham Smith on the cover art for Journeys to Glory and commented, "We enjoy playing with imagery, but at that time everyone was taking us far too seriously." To give an example of a lighter moment from the album, he said, "'Muscle Bound' was quite tongue-in-cheek," and explained, "I've always liked folk music since I was really young, and 'Muscle Bound' was like a folk song with quite a funny lyric." He "didn't think that a folk song of that kind" had ever reached the pop charts in the UK and described it as "an experiment". In his autobiography he called it "a unique blend of constructivist propaganda, Russian folk music and slow-jive disco (pompous was fashionable then), all inspired by a typically Blitz-dreamt European nostalgia."

== Recording ==
In September 1980 Spandau Ballet began recording Journeys to Glory at The Manor in the village of Shipton-on-Cherwell, Oxfordshire. Because "To Cut a Long Story Short" was so well received at BBC Radio 1, the record labels competing for the band agreed that they could start recording it as a single in addition to the rest of their first album and that the label they signed with would pay for the studio time. Looking back, Burgess wrote, "I have never seen that happen before or since." The rural setting, however, put them out of their comfort zone, and they were much closer to home at Jam recording studios in Finsbury Park by the time they signed with Chrysalis Records on 10 October.

Some of the sessions were also done at Trident Studios, where The Beatles, David Bowie, Elton John and Queen had recorded. Norman said, "The sound of all the legends must have been in all the walls," and described the effect of those particular surroundings: “The place had such an energy to it; it makes you raise your game." Its location in Soho also made a difference in that their friends from the Blitz could hang out and provide support.

On recording the songs, Norman pointed out that, on "Mandolin", lead singer Tony Hadley's voice is "really exaggerated and over-the-top…, but he's acting in it". He also said, "I remember when we were recording 'Toys' that I suddenly had my feet on the monitors, rocking out, despite wearing a kilt". Because Hadley had no lyrics to sing during the chorus, Norman added guitar to fill out the arrangement. On that particular song he admitted, "I felt like a rock god when we were making it, even though I immediately knew we weren't."

They completed the recording of Journeys to Glory by the end of the year.

== Packaging ==
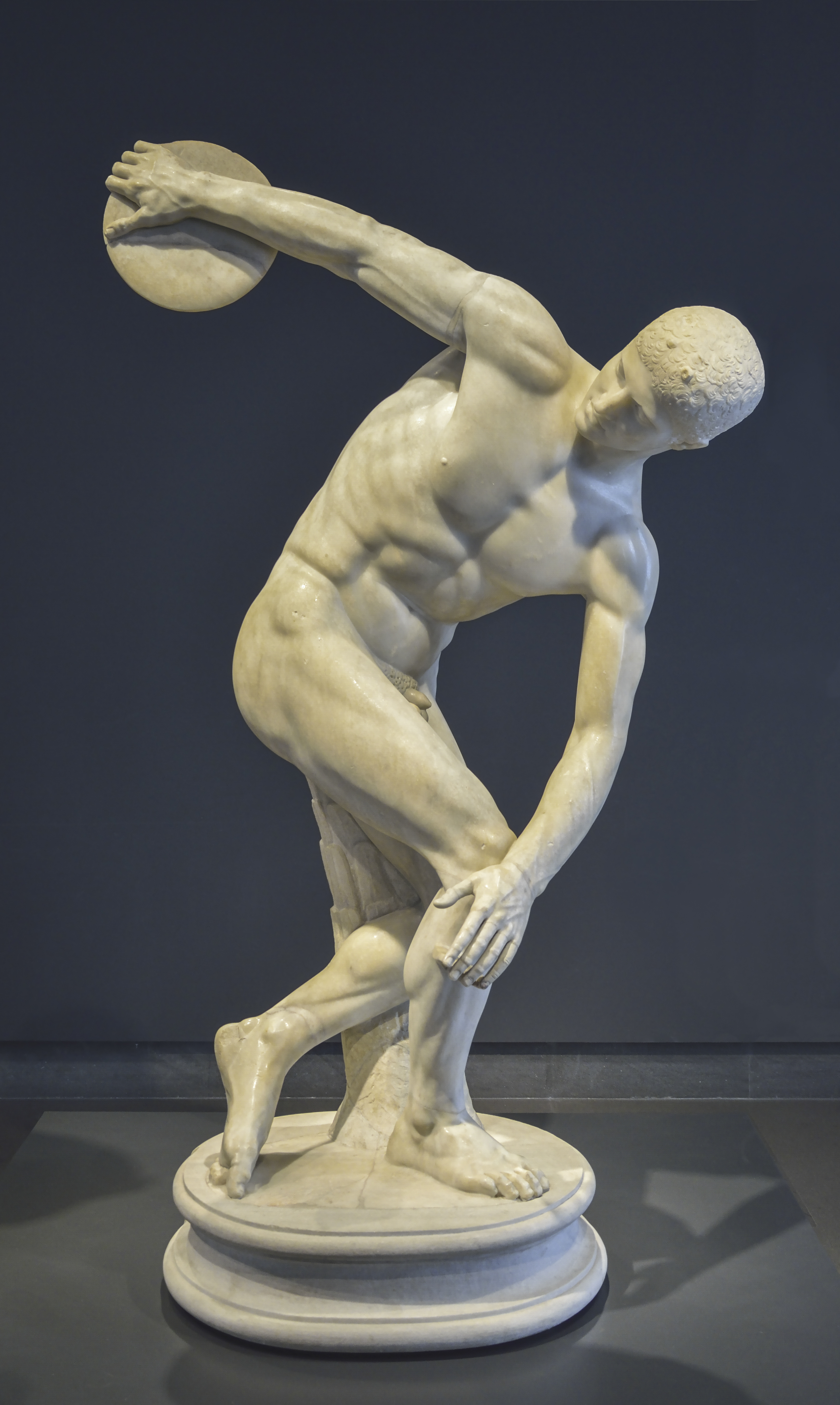
Graham Smith based the artwork on the cover of the album on Myron's Discobolus, a copy of which is seen here.

Kemp described himself as obsessed with every detail regarding the group and the presentation of the album. He had a book called Journeys to Glory about people who took their religious beliefs to masochistic extremes: "It seemed a perfect title for our first album: as well as being wonderfully pompous and presumptuous, it was made to irritate the enemy [i.e., the middle-class rock press] and clearly stated our intentions." Blitz regular Robert Elms incorporated the title into a poem included on the inner sleeve of the album that spoke of "angular glimpses of sharp youth cutting strident shapes through the curling gray". Kemp credits the band for deciding not to include song lyrics with the album, explaining that "we thought people ought to listen to it as a whole."

Another Blitz patron, Graham Smith, designed the cover for the album as well as its three singles ("To Cut a Long Story Short", "The Freeze" and the double-sided "Muscle Bound" /"Glow"). Kemp explained to New Sounds New Styles magazine in 1982 that they wanted to have the same motif for all of them and that it was "quite an original idea at the time because, although a lot of bands do it now, then everyone just did individual artwork for each single." Smith said, "I wanted to create an overall corporate visual package for Spandau that was cutting edge and reflected their aspirations. It had to have style." The image on the cover of Journeys to Glory was based on Greek sculptor Myron's Discobolus ("discus thrower") and was embossed white on white for the limited edition release of the album.

The only photo of the band was on the inner sleeve because Kemp felt that the styles were changing too quickly, that their current look would be out of date soon and that they should not put what would soon be a dated picture on the front or back cover. Smith said, "This was obviously seen as a perverse and uncommercial move by Chrysalis" that would still seem so thirty years on. He explained that this approach "gave mystique to this new and very visual band. It added a strength to Spandau as they were clearly stating they were not packaged by the record company but doing things on their terms."

== Critical reception ==
Professional ratings
Review scores
Source	Rating
AllMusic	1.5/5 stars
The Encyclopedia of Popular Music	2/5 stars
Record Mirror	3.5/5 stars
The Rolling Stone Album Guide	1.5/5 stars
Smash Hits	7/10
Sounds	5/5 stars
The Village Voice	C

The album received generally mixed reviews at the time of its release. In his autobiography To Cut a Long Story Short, Hadley noted that the critic in Melody Maker "dismissed us as 'nothing more than a bundle of fancy rags without a peg to hang them on.' The album, he wrote, represented 'superficial music for superficial people.'" The New Musical Express called it "an awfully ordinary record…. Journeys to Glory is an unremarkable affair by any standards. Not bad, but modest." Robert Christgau labeled it a "Must to Avoid". Billboard magazine recommended it to retailers for the appeal of its dance music but had reservations, writing that Spandau Ballet "makes a moody brand of rock with a heavy disco backbeat. In fact, it is this disco element that works against the material as much of the subtleties and nuances in the music are bludgeoned out." Cash Box magazine selected "Age of Blows" and "Confused" as the best tracks on the album. In rating it a 7 out of 10, David Hepworth of Smash Hits wrote, "This is background music, and that's not the insult it might seem." While he did not enjoy finding "a slavish reliance on the same bass lines, some pretty affected lyrics and an unwillingness to move up through the gears when build-up is called for", he thought it had "a clean, spacious and unfussy approach to sound, which should ensure repeated play." Sunie Fletcher of Record Mirror described it as "a more than fair debut album with some good songs and a couple of duff ones, a talented set of musicians and a singer who needs a tragic love affair or something to put a little humanity into his performance." Betty Page of Sounds magazine gave the album five stars and wrote that it "oozes style, taste, cool and purity, reflecting perfectly the scene that spawned Spandau Ballet." She concluded, "Journeys to Glory will appeal to the many nationwide who recognise the value of creativity, style, self-respect, imagination, passion and escapism, who realise music can't change the world but can influence personal attitudes."

Retrospective reviews were also mixed. In The Rolling Stone Album Guide Paul Evans thought "To Cut a Long Story Short" was the only good song and found "Muscle Bound" and "Reformation" to be "thin and monotonous". On AllMusic Dan LeRoy thought the band was "not quite ready for prime time" in his review of the original album, but in reviewing a reissue in which it was paired with their 1982 follow-up, Diamond, Dave Thompson pointed out the shortcomings of their sophomore effort first and then wrote, "No such problems with Journeys to Glory, an album that cloaks even its ballads with a gritty sheen driving straight out of vintage Bowie (circa Station to Station), and totally lets rip across 'The Freeze', 'To Cut a Long Story Short' and, best of all, 'Muscle Bound'." Giuseppe D'Amato of Ondarock viewed Journeys to Glory as an important snapshot of the contemporary counterculture. He praised Kemp for blending austere electronic sounds with warmer, groove-driven rhythms, and drew comparisons to artists including Simple Minds, OMD and Japan. In 2007 The Guardian included the album on its list of "1000 albums to hear before you die", and in 2020 the album came in at number 25 on Classic Pop magazine's list of the top 40 '80s debut albums. The editors advised checking out the album "if you want to experience the full-on sweaty visceral Spandau". They wrote, "Like Duran's eponymous first LP, this is a scrapbook of their New Romantic phase and stands proudly as a period piece."

== Singles and videos ==
Since "To Cut a Long Story Short" seemed destined for success, Dagger and the band chose a release date of 31 October 1980 for the single and the song debuted on the UK Singles Chart dated 15 November and peaked at number 5 during its 11 weeks there. It also reached the pop charts in Australia, Ireland, New Zealand and Spain, and in the US, Billboard magazine paired the 12-inch remix of the song with the dance version of "The Freeze" for their appearance on the Disco Top 100. The band wore Culloden and Edwardian Scottish military regalia for the music video and for their debut on Top of the Pops to perform the song. It received mixed reviews at the time of its release, with some critics describing it as "ordinary" and others as "a massively competent record". Retrospective reviews have described it as "a minor lost classic of the early '80s UK synth pop scene" and "an era-defining slice of electronic myth-making, and a great dance record to boot".

"The Freeze" was released on 12 January 1981 as the next single and made its first appearance on the UK Singles Chart dated 24 January to begin an eight-week run, during which time it peaked at number 17. In addition to its tandem dance chart run in the US, it also made the pop charts in Ireland and Spain. As with "To Cut a Long Story Short", the music video for "The Freeze" was directed by Brian Grant. An appearance on Top of the Pops was also included in the promotional efforts. One contemporary reviewer thought the song was "wonderful", but another chided the band for "thinking that superbly chunky dance stance drums [were] enough to compensate for a lack of imagination." In revisiting the album on its list of '80s debuts, Classic Pop also said, "There's a spiky funkiness about Spandau's early sound that was excised in the chase for hits, best evidenced by the choppy guitars of 'The Freeze'."

The third song released from the album, "Muscle Bound", was issued on 27 March on a double A-side single, paired with "Glow", which was written after the recording of Journeys to Glory was completed. The single began 10 weeks on the UK pop chart on 4 April and got as high as number 10 and also hit the pop charts in Australia, Ireland, and the Netherlands. In the US "Glow" was a dance chart entry by itself. "Muscle Bound" was presented by Spandau Ballet on Top of the Pops, and Russell Mulcahy was hired to direct the music video for the song, which was filmed in the Lake District in several feet of snow. "Muscle Bound" received mostly good reviews, including one proclaiming that it "shrivels the LP under its heat [and] makes those other singles sound like tinny, teenybop jingles." One critic appreciated the "romantic, poetic imagery that is not insipid or starry-eyed but powerful and thoughtful," and another thought it was "a clever, seductive spin on body politics". Thompson called it "a sweaty slab of twilight homoerotica that really is as beefy as its title suggests," and categorized all three songs from the album that were released as singles as "utterly convincing white boy Funk".

== Commercial performance ==
Journeys to Glory was released on 6 March 1981 and started a UK Albums Chart run of 29 weeks on 14 March that included a number 5 peak position. The British Phonographic Industry awarded the album both Silver and Gold certification on 28 April for reaching the respective 60,000 and 100,000 units of shipment thresholds. It debuted on the Australian album chart on 4 May and reached number 14 over the course of 17 weeks. In the US it spent its sole chart appearance at number 209 on Billboard magazine's list of albums that were Bubbling Under the Top LPs in the issue dated 16 May.

The album was reissued on compact disc in 2010 with B-sides and remixes of the singles and previously unreleased live tracks from a 1981 BBC Session.

== Aftermath ==
As the band was in the process of finishing the album, Kemp was noticing a renewed interest in funk around Soho and was inspired by American disco acts such as the Fatback Band and Dr. Buzzard to write "Glow", which he described as "American style funk – but still with white lyrics". "Glow" then served as inspiration for the music of "Chant No. 1 (I Don't Need This Pressure On)", their first single from an album that had yet to be written. In discussing his difficulty in composing more songs, Kemp explained why their first album came together so well: "Journeys had been developed over some time and played live before we went into the recording studio, with some songs being discarded at the last minute. It was a mission statement, cohesive and tight, with none of the indulgence that often plagues follow-ups." He thought "Chant No. 1" would help guide him, but instead it slowed him down as he watched it climb to number 3 in the UK.

The next two singles he churned out were not as successful, with "Paint Me Down" stalling at 30 and "She Loved Like Diamond" at 49 just as their parent album, Diamond, was being released. They had kept Burgess on as producer of all of the new songs Kemp had written but were not pleased with the resulting LP. Dagger had the idea to release another single so that the album would keep selling and thought they should remix a track on the album called "Instinction" to do that because it was the closest thing to a pop song that they had recorded so far. When they considered Buggles founder Trevor Horn to produce the remix, Kemp realized that Spandau Ballet needed to evolve into a pop group if it was going to survive. After "Instinction" reached number 10, he began to notice that the crowd of hipsters they started out wanting to please were no longer interested, and he felt free to write with no regard for danceability or the latest rhythm. Their next album, True, was crafted with "a sleek and mainstream sound" and "a set of tunes aimed squarely at the charts".

== Track listing ==
All tracks are written by Gary Kemp.

No.	Title	Length
1.	"To Cut a Long Story Short"	3:20
2.	"Reformation"	4:54
3.	"Mandolin"	4:07
4.	"Muscle Bound"	5:06
5.	"Age of Blows"	4:09
6.	"The Freeze"	4:35
7.	"Confused"	4:38
8.	"Toys"	5:48

Journeys to Glory – 2010 edition (bonus tracks)
No.	Title	Length
9.	"The Freeze" (7" version)	3:34
10.	"Muscle Bound" (7" version)	4:01
11.	"Glow" (7" version)	3:48

Journeys to Glory – 2010 edition (bonus disc)
No.	Title	Length
1.	"To Cut a Long Story Short" (12" version)	6:32
2.	"The Freeze" (special mix)	6:33
3.	"Glow" (12" version)	8:10
4.	"The Freeze" (12" version)	4:20
5.	"The Freeze" (BBC session)	4:43
6.	"Mandolin" (BBC session)	4:08
7.	"Muscle Bound" (BBC session)	4:52
8.	"Glow" (BBC session)	4:15

== Personnel ==
Credits adapted from the liner notes for the album:

Spandau Ballet

- Tony Hadley – vocals, synthesizers
- Gary Kemp – synthesizers, guitars
- Steve Norman – guitars
- Martin Kemp – bass
- John Keeble – drums

Production

- Richard James Burgess – producer
- John Etcham – engineer (Jam)
- Stephen Short – engineer (Trident Studios)
- Andy Jackson – engineer (Utopia)
- Hugh Padgham – engineer (The Manor)
- Marlis Duncklau – engineer (The Manor)
- Graham Smith – design and photography
- Lee Andrews – hair
- Simon Withers – lighting

== Charts ==
=== Weekly charts ===
Weekly chart performance for Journeys to Glory
Chart (1981)	Peak position
Australia Albums (Kent Music Report)	14
New Zealand Albums (RMNZ)	12
UK Albums (Official Charts)	5

=== Year-end charts ===
Year-end chart performance for Journeys to Glory
Chart (1981)	Position
New Zealand Albums (RMNZ)	47
UK Albums (OCC)	52

== Certifications ==
Certifications for Journeys to Glory
Region	Certification	Certified units/sales
United Kingdom (BPI)	Gold	100,000^{^}
^{^} Shipments figures based on certification alone.
