= Muscle Bound =

Single by Spandau Ballet

from the album Journeys to Glory
- A-side: "Glow" (double A-side)
- Released: 27 March 1981
- Recorded: 1980
- Genre: New wave
- Length: 3:58
- Label: Chrysalis; Reformation
- Songwriter: Gary Kemp
- Producer: Richard James Burgess

Spandau Ballet singles chronology
"The Freeze" (1981)	"Muscle Bound" / "Glow" (1981)	"Chant No. 1 (I Don't Need This Pressure On)" (1981)

"Muscle Bound" is a song by the English new wave band Spandau Ballet, released as part of the third single from their debut album Journeys to Glory. In the UK, it was released as a double A-side with the song "Glow"; elsewhere, "Glow" was included as the B-side. "Muscle Bound" received mostly good reviews, and the combined single was their third consecutive top 20 hit in their native UK, reaching number 10 on the UK Singles Chart. The music video for "Muscle Bound" was more ambitious than their previous promotional clips and went over budget because of snowy weather that caused delays during the location shoot in the Lake District.

== Background ==
Spandau Ballet had a number 5 hit with their debut single, "To Cut a Long Story Short" and reached number 17 with their follow-up, "The Freeze". In a May 1982 interview with New Sounds New Styles magazine, their guitarist/songwriter, Gary Kemp, explained that the band wanted all of the singles from their debut album, Journeys to Glory, to use the same motif on their covers as the album itself. Graham Smith was credited with their design and was inspired by the works of John Flaxman for the cover of the "Muscle Bound" single, which was released on 27 March 1981. When New Sounds New Styles asked about working with Smith on the cover art for Journeys to Glory, Kemp commented, "We enjoy playing with imagery, but at that time everyone was taking us far too seriously." To give an example of a lighter moment from the album, he said, "'Muscle Bound' was quite tongue-in-cheek," and explained, "I've always liked folk music since I was really young, and 'Muscle Bound' was like a folk song with quite a funny lyric." He "didn't think that a folk song of that kind" had ever reached the pop charts in the UK and described it as "an experiment". In his autobiography he called it "a unique blend of constructivist propaganda, Russian folk music and slow-jive disco (pompous was fashionable then), all inspired by a typically Blitz-dreamt European nostalgia."

== Music video ==
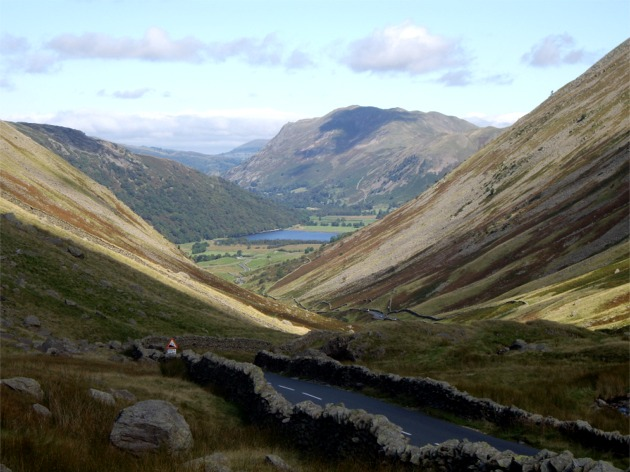
The music video was filmed on and around the Kirkstone Pass in the Lake District.

The Kirkstone Pass in the English Lake District was chosen as the filming location for the music video because it looked like the Russian Steppe. Russell Mulcahy was hired to direct, and it wound up costing more than double its original budget of £15,000 and taking longer than the one scheduled day to film because the area had just received several feet of snow. According to Martin Kemp, "Originally, we’d arranged to be there for a two-day shoot but our plan quickly came unstuck as the area was hit by an unexpectedly massive snowfall. It made the setting look absolutely incredible, but filming absolutely impossible. Locked in a little pub, those two days soon became four." Mulcahy was only partially successful in getting all of the band members to ride horses; when Gary Kemp was thrown from the thoroughbred he was given and knocked unconscious, drummer John Keeble became unnerved, dismounted and refused to get back on. Lead singer Tony Hadley, on the other hand, insisted on continuing to ride when Mulcahy felt weather conditions were too dangerous. Spandau Ballet's guitarist/saxophonist, Steve Norman, noted in 2021, "You wouldn’t have dwarves in a video now like 'Muscle Bound' does, but that was very much of its time." Kemp believed that the amount of footage gave the video a large-scale feel and created a bit of a competition with Duran Duran to have Mulcahy "make even more ambitious videos for them".

== Critical reception ==
Spandau Ballet - "Muscle Bound"
One critic commented, "They swing into a chain gang rhythm, painting a vivid picture of Eastern Bloc labour, more by the music than by the words."

Although The Rolling Stone Album Guide found "Muscle Bound" to be "thin and monotonous", the song otherwise received good reviews, including one from the New Musical Express proclaiming that it "shrivels the LP under its heat [and] makes those other singles sound like tinny, teenybop jingles." Betty Page of Sounds magazine appreciated the "romantic, poetic imagery that is not insipid or starry-eyed but powerful and thoughtful". Record Mirror music critic Rosalind Russell wrote, "They swing into a chain gang rhythm, painting a vivid picture of Eastern Bloc labour, more by the music than by the words. The Russian sounding break in the middle adds to the Red Army Choir impression just enough to stir the imagination. Another Steppe in the right direction." Dylan Jones thought it was "a clever, seductive spin on body politics". Dave Thompson of AllMusic called it "a sweaty slab of twilight homoerotica that really is as beefy as its title suggests," and categorized all three songs from the album that were released as singles as "utterly convincing white boy Funk".

Melody Maker in their 1995 special feature on the Romo movement, claimed that the song's subject matter was strongly influenced by the German Burschenschaft in the 19th century, particularly their practice of assembling at night in the mountains around campfires to read and recite literature.

== Release and commercial performance ==
"Muscle Bound" was issued on a double A-side single, paired with "Glow", which was written after the recording of Journeys to Glory was completed. The single began 10 weeks on the UK pop chart on 4 April and got as high as number 10 and reached number 97 in Australia, number 18 in Ireland, and number 32 in the Netherlands.

In addition to the album version of "Muscle Bound", the 2010 CD reissue of Journeys to Glory included the 7-inch version as well as a recording of the song taken from a March 1981 BBC session.

== Formats and track listings ==
- 7-inch single
1. "Muscle Bound" — 3:58
2. "Glow" — 3:48
- 12-inch single
1. "Glow" — 8:10
2. "Muscle Bound" — 4:54

== Personnel ==
Credits adapted from the liner notes for Journeys to Glory:

- Tony Hadley – vocals, synthesizer
- John Keeble – drums
- Gary Kemp – guitar, synthesizer
- Martin Kemp – bass
- Steve Norman – guitar
- Richard James Burgess – producer
- Graham Smith – graphics

== Charts ==
Chart (1981)	Peak position
Australia (Kent Music Report)	97
Ireland (IRMA)	18
Luxembourg (Radio Luxembourg)	11
Netherlands (Single Top 100)	32
UK Singles (Official Charts)	10

== Bibliography ==
- Gimarc, George (1997). Post Punk Diary, 1980–1982. New York: St. Martin's Press. ISBN 978-0-312-16968-8.
- Hadley, Tony (2004). To Cut a Long Story Short. London: Sidgwick & Jackson. ISBN 978-0-283-07386-1.
- Kemp, Gary (2009). I Know This Much: From Soho to Spandau. London: Fourth Estate. ISBN 978-0-00-732330-2.
- Kemp, Martin (2022). Ticket to the World. London: HarperCollins. ISBN 978-0-008-58604-1.
- Kent, David (1993). Australian Chart Book 1970–1992 (illustrated ed.). St Ives, N.S.W.: Australian Chart Book. ISBN 0-646-11917-6.
