= To Cut a Long Story Short =

Single by Spandau Ballet

from the album Journeys to Glory
- B-side: "To Cut a Long Story Short" "Version" version [dub mix]
- Released: 31 October 1980
- Genre: Synth-pop; art pop; new wave; Eurodisco; funk
- Length: 3:20 (single version); 6:30 (12-inch version)
- Label: Chrysalis; Reformation
- Songwriter: Gary Kemp
- Producer: Richard James Burgess

Spandau Ballet singles chronology
"To Cut a Long Story Short" (1980)	"The Freeze" (1981)

"To Cut a Long Story Short" is the debut single by the English new wave band Spandau Ballet, released on 31 October 1980, and later included on their 1981 debut album Journeys to Glory. The band began recording the song before they were signed to a record label because of the interest they had generated with a debut concert for patrons of the exclusive weekly London nightclub the Blitz as well as a Christmas party at that establishment. After having tried other popular genres, the band had been preparing to make their debut as performers of dance music and wanted the public to associate them with the young crowd who met at the Blitz every Tuesday. They needed their guitarist/songwriter, Gary Kemp, to come up with something that they could feel confident about presenting to the top tier of the club's regulars at their first performance.

By shaping their image around an exclusive club scene, Spandau Ballet piqued the interest of a television documentary filmmaker who then wanted to film the band in concert as part of presenting their story. A popular DJ attended the concert and requested that they record some of the songs for him to play on his show, and "To Cut a Long Story Short" became so popular that other shows on the station aired it as well. Several record labels were in touch with them after the documentary aired in July 1980, but the band had a long list of requirements that had to be met and had difficulty deciding which label would meet all their needs. The song had gained such popularity on that one station that the labels in the running all agreed that the one the band chose to sign with would pay for the session time needed to record it right away and start working on their first album.

The fact that they had little money to spend on the music video for "To Cut a Long Story Short" did not prevent the band from wearing historical military outfits. They kept the same look for their debut on the British music chart television programme Top of the Pops, emphasizing that their image was as much a part of their performance as their music. The single received mixed reviews at the time of its release, but when it got as high as number 5 on the UK Singles Chart, several other UK pop groups that were associated with nightclubs were signed to record labels and began charting in the US as part of the Second British Invasion as well as at home.

The record contract that Spandau Ballet signed with Chrysalis Records stipulated that covering the cost of remixing their songs for dance clubs would be included. The band was inspired by the practice of creating dub mixes and released both the 7- and 12-inch singles with such reinterpretations of the song on the B-side. The contract also gave control over all aspects of how their music was presented, which allowed them to get help from the creative regulars from the Blitz who specialized in such things as graphic design, hair and costumes. The tactics that put Spandau Ballet in the public eye with the song were more about recognizing the cultural shift that these young people represented than they were about just having a hit record.

== Background ==
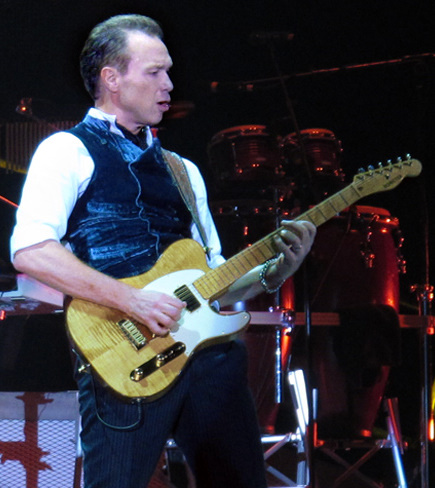
Gary Kemp wrote many Spandau Ballet songs, including "To Cut a Long Story Short"

Just as the Sex Pistols epitomized the punk era in British youth culture, the Gentry - Spandau Ballet's initial identity - wanted to be the band to represent the Blitz Kids, the fashionable clientele who gathered every Tuesday for the weekly London nightclub the Blitz. The band worked on what their guitarist/songwriter Gary Kemp referred to as "white European disco music" and presented it to their manager, Steve Dagger, who explained that they needed to get ready for their debut quickly because of the growing competition to be the breakout artist amongst their peers. Band member Steve Norman, who started out as one of their guitarists, recalled, "Once Gary had the riff for 'To Cut a Long Story Short', it felt so right." Kemp concurred that the band was confident that they were ready to make their debut the first time they played the song in which the singer begins providing details regarding certain undesirable circumstances but concludes with, "To cut a long story short, I lost my mind". On BBC Radio 4's Mastertapes series in 2013, Kemp said, "The lyrics to those kind of songs, I mean, I suppose they owed something to Bowie's famous cut-ups, you know, slightly esoteric, this grand landscape that we're all living on. That was the kind of lyric, very early 80s lyric about a kind of heroic place that we all wanted to put ourselves." In his autobiography I Know This Much: From Soho to Spandau, he described the song as "garage-band stuff – short, to the point, and very English. With its portentous refrain of 'We are [sic] beautiful and clean and so very, very young', it seemed the perfect manifesto – or at least lyrical sound-bite – for the Blitz generation."

The Gentry's first Blitz-style concert was a private show for a small group of people from the club in November 1979, and that resulted in the selection of the new band name, Spandau Ballet, and an invitation to perform at the Blitz Christmas party on 5 December. The media became interested, which resulted in photographers and film crews gathering outside the club for Blitz night every Tuesday, but the band saw the music press as ignorant and was not interested in speaking to them. Kemp described the vibe that was the result of the band's exclusivity: "No demo tapes were sent out, and although our name was spreading quickly around town and beyond, very few people knew what we sounded like. It made them want to hear us even more." Dagger, however, felt they needed more media coverage to keep their momentum going and arranged profiles of the band in two London newspapers and a review of one of their concerts in the New Musical Express. When the producer of a Sex Pistols documentary for television was interested in filming Spandau Ballet in concert for such a programme, the band seized the opportunity and performed on 13 May 1980 in front of television cameras and an audience that included journalists and record company executives. The documentary aired on 13 July, and several major labels were in touch within days.

== Recordings ==
In addition to meeting with several different labels to begin to negotiate a contract, the band also scheduled a public performance on HMS Belfast on the River Thames. While several labels were represented in the crowd, the A&R executive for Arista Records was unable to attend and offered to pay for the recording of a demo of some of their songs, so on 31 August the band recorded "To Cut a Long Story Short", "The Freeze", "Confused" and "Reformation". "To Cut a Long Story Short" was also one of the four songs recorded at a studio session for BBC Radio 1 DJ Peter Powell to play regularly on his show because he enjoyed attending their documentary concert, and it also happened to be the one he played most often. Other Radio 1 shows also aired the session recording of the song, and their listeners were eager to get a copy of it. Kemp admitted that "the song started to appear as though it were a single before we even had a record label."

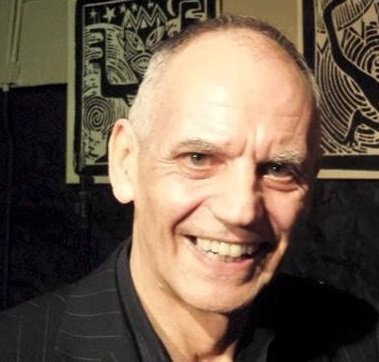
Richard James Burgess produced "To Cut a Long Story Short"

On the fortieth anniversary of the song's release, Spandau Ballet producer Richard James Burgess recalled, "Labels were at a fever pitch trying to sign the group." Burgess, co-founding member of Landscape, had been impressed when he saw Spandau Ballet perform at the Blitz. Kemp showed interest in Landscape's current album that he mentioned he was working on and took advantage of the opportunity to listen to some rough recordings from the project. Burgess received a call from Dagger a couple of days later asking if he wanted to be their producer. He was "ecstatic" that the band chose him, but because he had little production experience, he thought the label they would be signing with would want a big-name producer instead. Years later, appreciating that he was kept on, he said, "I was over the moon because it was obviously a great opportunity for me."

Since the song seemed destined for success, Dagger and the band chose a release date of 31 October for the single and started to record it as well as their first album, and the labels competing to sign the band all agreed that the chosen one would pay for their studio time. Looking back, Burgess wrote, "I have never seen that happen before or since." The group had recorded some of "To Cut A Long Story Short" by 10 October when they signed with Chrysalis Records, and they skipped celebrating the event afterward and went straight back to the studio to continue their work. The managing director of Chrysalis UK felt the song would be a success based solely on what they had completed that evening when Dagger took him to the studio. Upon revisiting the recordings of the song in 2020, Norman was reminded of the "minor annoyances" left in the recording, "such as the odd volume levels which I felt required tweaking but weren’t done as we ran out of studio time. And my slightly out of tune guitar wouldn’t get past anybody these days, so accustomed are our ears now to pitch correction software."

Kemp suggested to Burgess that they remix the song for the B-side of the 7-inch single and then remembered the reggae dubs and remixes done by King Tubby and Lee "Scratch" Perry dating back to the sixties. Burgess later described the limitations he and Kemp were dealing with at the time: "Tubby and Perry were not working with high technology in Jamaica, and our trick-bag was still light even as the eighties dawned. Drum machines, samplers, and digital audio workstations were a futuristic dream. We were limited to repeat echo, reverb, overdubs, mixing breakdown pieces, and tape editing." They thought of this remix as having been inspired by those recordings rather than as an attempt at performing an all-out reggae version of the song, and they borrowed the terminology from those record labels by using the subtitle "Version". The band made it a contractual obligation that their record label would also pay for dance mixes, and the 12-inch single included a dub mix labeled "Version" as well. Dagger said the 12-inch dance mix was "different from most of the electronic dance music" that the DJs usually played, adding, "The European and Japanese music sounded very 'polite' compared to this. It sounded very British and slightly punky." Kemp described its brashness in his autobiography, writing, "'To Cut a Long Story Short' was taut, succinct, rude and uncompromising, with an all-in-at-once intro that sounded as though the door of the Blitz had been kicked open. And now the youth of Britain were about to rush in." Norman told Classic Pop magazine that the song reflected "our certainty about ourselves at that time." He explained that the success they had with it "wasn't just about the song or even us as a band. It was about that whole [Blitz Kids] movement…. There's something about the arrogance of youth in 'Story': you can hear that our attitude is 'We're here now, and if you don't like it, get out of the way.'"

== Cover art ==
We were all in it together to cause a revolution.

— Steve Dagger on the band's use of the Blitz Kids behind the scenes

Another part of Spandau Ballet's deal with Chrysalis was that the band would have control over every aspect of how their music was marketed, including artwork, videos and the selection of songs to be released as singles, and they found most of their support team at the club. Blitz regular and Camberwell College of Arts graphics student Graham Smith came up with the design for the sleeve of their first single as well as the album they had begun, Journeys to Glory, and the other songs from it that were also released in the 7- and 12-inch formats: "The Freeze", "Muscle Bound" and "Glow". "I wanted to create an overall corporate visual package for Spandau that was cutting edge and reflected their aspirations. It had to have style." The cover for "To Cut A Long Story Short" was a minimalist design that Smith felt mirrored the lyric "I am beautiful and clean". There was no photo of the band on it, which Kemp thought "would be too risky, given the speed at which styles were changing". Smith said, "This was obviously seen as a perverse and uncommercial move by Chrysalis" that would still seem so thirty years on. He explained that this approach "gave mystique to this new and very visual band. It added a strength to Spandau as they were clearly stating they were not packaged by the record company but doing things on their terms."

== Critical reception ==
Spandau Ballet - "To Cut a Long Story Short"
Kemp's "all-in-at-once" intro that one reviewer described as a merely "cute synthesiser riff".

Mark Cooper of Record Mirror was not impressed by the media exposure that Spandau Ballet had received by the time "To Cut A Long Story Short" was available for review. "Lots of advance publicity for this and mention of moneys, which fail to create a sense of obligation to enjoy." His major points of criticism were directed at elements of the song that underscored why he felt the band was overblown: "Their debut single features a cute synthesiser riff that pretends to be profound and is pure pop with a vocal that verges on the operatic." His conclusion also emphasizes what he saw as a tendency toward the grandiose. "Apart from a delightful series of rim shots and drumrolls in the middle, this is ordinary, a short story trying to become a novel." In an otherwise scathing review of the band's December 1980 concert at London's LGBT nightclub Heaven, Richard Williams of The Times credited the song with having "a hook line reminiscent of the better psychedelic records". It was chosen as one of the best tracks on Journeys to Glory in Billboard magazine's review of the album, and Alan Lewis of Sounds magazine was quite complimentary: "It is a good record using the modern technology in a warmer, more organic way… the lead vocal [is not] the usual alienated robot wimp but a big, mature full-bodied roar. This is clearly NOT the work of a bunch of out-of-work hairdressers who've managed to stumble through a few gigs, but a massively competent record by a band with plenty in reserve."

In retrospective reviews on AllMusic, Dave Thompson included "To Cut a Long Story Short" on a list of Spandau Ballet songs that were "utterly convincing white boy Funk"; Ned Raggett interpreted it as a "rent-boy scenario" in singling it out as one of their better early tracks; and Stewart Mason described it as minimalist "spiky synth-pop" with a style reminiscent of early Orchestral Manoeuvres in the Dark material and featuring a "dirty, overdriven synth sound and a stomping Gary Glitter-like backbeat". Although he described it as "largely forgotten" today due to Spandau Ballet's later successful change in style towards "smooth, soulful pop", he suggested it was "a minor lost classic of the early-'80s UK synth pop scene". Ian Gittins wrote in The Guardian that the song "remains a sharp exercise in art-pop weirdness, all twitchy synths and bubbling urgency". For Dylan Jones it was "an era-defining slice of electronic myth-making, and a great dance record to boot (if it hadn't been, the cognoscenti, those who went to the same clubs as Spandau, would have strangled it at birth – or, more pertinently, refused to dance to it)."

== Release and commercial performance ==
Early indicators of the song's chances were encouraging. The Radio 1 studio session recording was in high rotation on the station before the commercial single was available. The station's weekly "Roundtable" record review show featured pop stars giving their opinion of the latest singles, and the week that "To Cut a Long Story Short" was reviewed, one of the panelists was Bryan Ferry, who Dagger described as "second only to David Bowie as style, musical and lifestyle inspiration to our generation." They were relieved to hear Ferry describe it as a "smart, witty single". Dagger hand-delivered the dance version of the song to the DJs in London at their clubs when it came out, and "because of the hype around the band, they all played it almost immediately". He and Chrysalis worked with promoters who knew other DJs around England to send it to, and those clubs also responded favorably.

"To Cut a Long Story Short" debuted on the UK Singles Chart dated 15 November 1980 and peaked at number 5 during its 11 weeks there. Lead singer Tony Hadley wrote, "No one expected a first single to shoot straight into the Top 10. In the Eighties, it was more about steady sales. Chrysalis would have been content with a Top 40 hit on the first single. It was about getting us on the map and raising the profile of the band." The British Phonographic Industry awarded the single Silver certification on 1 December for reaching the 250,000 units of shipment threshold. On other pop charts it reached number 9 in Ireland, number 15 in Australia, number 19 in Spain and number 38 in New Zealand. In the US, Billboard magazine paired the song on the Disco Top 100 with "The Freeze", and eventually they got as high as number 28.

== Music video ==
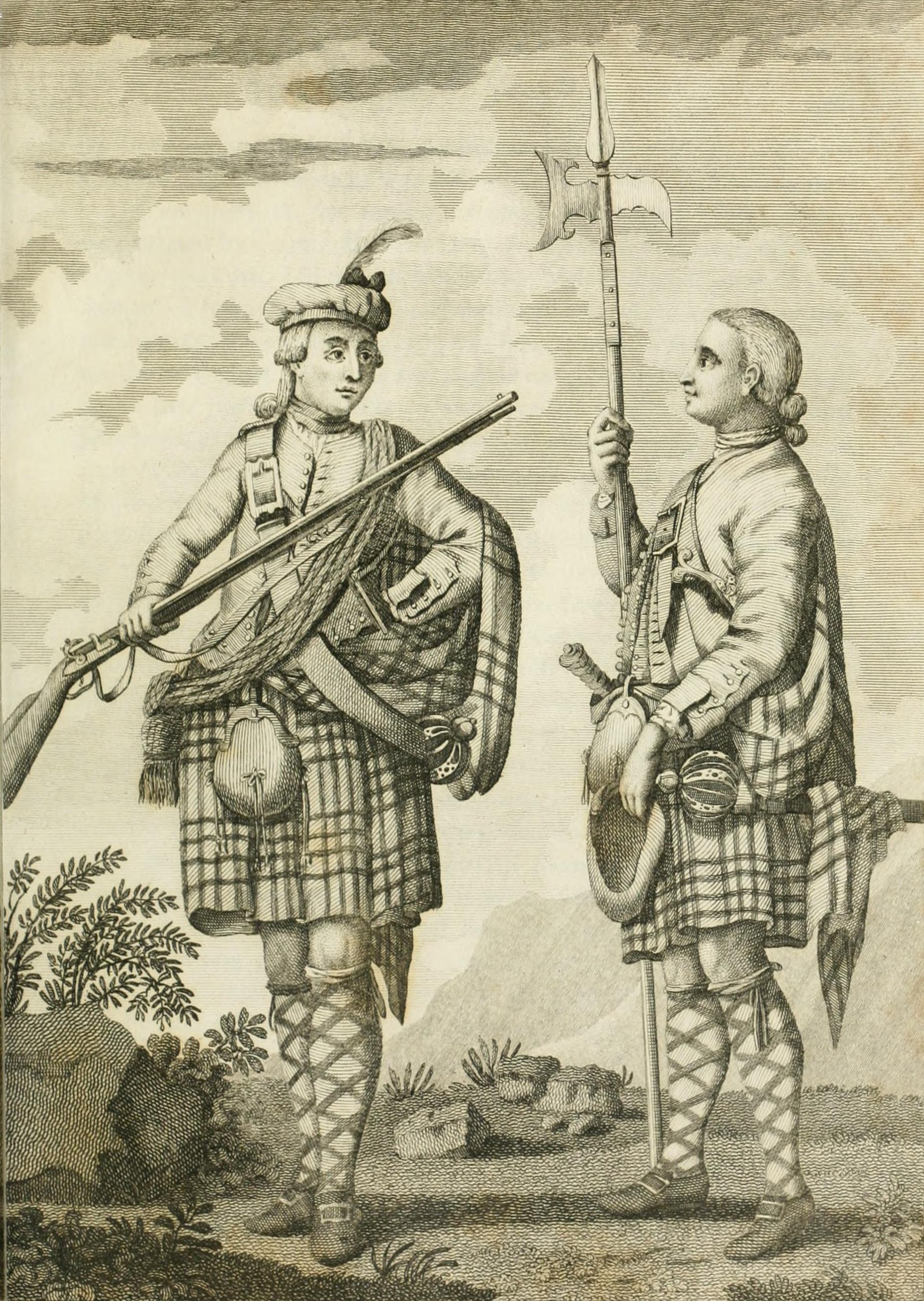
The band wore tartan military dress similar to these Highland soldiers for the music video and their first appearance on Top of the Pops.

Hadley recalled that the music video budget was "tight, around £5,000, which wasn't much", so they needed to shoot on videotape and use a location nearby. The band mimed a performance at the London Dungeon, then located in Tooley Street, and director Brian Grant, completed filming in one day. The lead singer was nervous and appreciated having a pair of binoculars to hold on to; he had no idea of what to do with his hands other than hold a cigarette, which would have been problematic as the BBC made them remove footage of people who were smoking. Shots of the band performing were interwoven with scenes of three Blitz friends playing cards and two young women who were also club regulars were dancing. Kemp felt their first video was "an opportunity to capture some of the flavour of who we were" and explained the band wore Culloden and Edwardian Scottish military regalia, which included a few tartan items. He said Hadley's binoculars were "meant to accentuate the battledress look and imply, I suppose, that we had the future in our sights."

The band chose similar garb for their debut on Top of the Pops, and Kemp marveled, "It was a look as yet unseen on this great British institution but would soon be copied on a thousand dance floors around the world." On being invited to appear on the show during the song's first week on the charts, Kemp said, "If anything, it felt like a greater high than signing [to Chrysalis] – the culmination of all the work; the proof of arrival."

== Twelve-inch single reissue ==
In 2020, to celebrate the fortieth anniversary of the release of "To Cut a Long Story Short", the two mixes featured on the original 12-inch single were reissued both as a two-track digital single and on 180g vinyl. Norman wrote that the last time he had heard the recordings was back around the time that they were released and that "the band's energy is all over it, which is how I remembered it sounding. This re-listening experience brought a smile to my face and, to be honest, made me feel somewhat proud all over again of all we were about to achieve as a band."

== Legacy ==
The signature riff from "To Cut a Long Story Short" was used as a sample looping throughout the Freestylers track "In Love with You", which was described as one of the "moments of boldness" on their 2006 album Adventures in Freestyle in a review by Andrew Drever for The Age.

Former Depeche Mode keyboardist and songwriter Vince Clarke told Rolling Stone magazine in 2000 that "To Cut a Long Story Short" inspired him to write 1981's "Just Can't Get Enough". He admitted, "Up to that point, I didn't like dance music or disco at all." Upon hearing the Spandau Ballet song, however, he said, "It was the first time I was actually impressed by a rhythm that went 'boom-thwack, boom-thwack, boom-thwack.' It was the first time I discovered dance music for myself, and to write a song around that rhythm was quite a revelation for me. 'Just Can't Get Enough' came out of that."

In 2009, former Evening Standard and music magazine journalist David Johnson gave a historical account of the rise of the band in an article titled "Spandau Ballet, the Blitz kids and the birth of the New Romantics". He wrote, "Within weeks of Spandau's hit ["To Cut a Long Story Short"], Britain's clubbing grapevine put yet more clubland bands into the charts, many unveiled by sharp young managers the same age as the talent. In the Blitz slipstream, a dynasty of 35 new-look acts charted during 1981 alone" – including Duran Duran, the Human League, Depeche Mode, Soft Cell and ABC. "In the next three years a second wave of image-led acts refreshed the pop charts to become household names", such as Bananarama, Culture Club, Wham! and Thompson Twins.

== Formats and track listings ==
- 7-inch single
1. "To Cut a Long Story Short" — 3:20
2. "To Cut a Long Story Short" ("Version" version [dub mix]) — 3:20
- 12-inch single
1. "To Cut a Long Story Short" (Mix 1) — 6:30
2. "To Cut a Long Story Short" (Mix 2) ("Version" version [dub mix]) — 3:56

== Personnel ==
Credits adapted from the liner notes for Journeys to Glory:

- Tony Hadley – vocals, synthesizer
- John Keeble – drums
- Gary Kemp – guitar, synthesizer
- Martin Kemp – bass
- Steve Norman – guitar
- Richard James Burgess – producer
- Graham Smith – graphics

== Charts ==
=== Weekly charts ===
Chart (1980–81)	Peak position
Australia (Kent Music Report)	15
Ireland (IRMA)	9
Luxembourg (Radio Luxembourg)	4
New Zealand (Recorded Music NZ)	38
Spain (AFYVE)	19
UK Singles (Official Charts)	5
US Dance Club Songs (Billboard)	28

=== Year-end charts ===
Year-end chart performance for "To Cut a Long Story Short"
Chart (1981)	Position
Australia (Kent Music Report)	81

== Certifications ==
Region	Certification	Certified units/sales
United Kingdom (BPI)	Silver	250,000^{^}
^{^} Shipments figures based on certification alone.

== Bibliography ==
- Gimarc, George (1997). Post Punk Diary, 1980–1982. St. Martin's Press. ISBN 978-0-312-16968-8.
- Hadley, Tony (2004). To Cut a Long Story Short. Sidgwick & Jackson. ISBN 978-0-283-07386-1.
- Kemp, Gary (2009). I Know This Much: From Soho to Spandau. London: Fourth Estate. ISBN 978-0-00-732330-2.
- Kent, David (1993). Australian Chart Book 1970–1992 (illustrated ed.). St Ives, N.S.W.: Australian Chart Book. ISBN 0-646-11917-6.
