= INSOLO =

Studio album by Gary Kemp
- Released: 16 July 2021
- Label: Columbia
- Producer: Gary Kemp; Toby Chapman

Gary Kemp chronology
Little Bruises (1995)	INSOLO (2021)

INSOLO is the second solo studio album of Gary Kemp, the former guitarist and songwriter of Spandau Ballet. The album was released on 16 July 2021, on Columbia Records, and was produced and mixed by Gary Kemp and Toby Chapman.

== Composition ==
The music, in contrast to the Irish folk instrumentation of his first album, reflects Kemp's time spent playing in Nick Mason's Saucerful of Secrets and his teenage pre-Spandau Ballet influences. Kemp told Jo Kendall of Prog, "There are 70s references on the whole album, and I'm pushing the guitar and psychedelia to the fore".

The album reflects Kemp's growing obsession with life seen through a rear view mirror after passing his 60th birthday and "confronting the past". Charlotte Cripps of The Independent noted, "Kemp's attachment to Spandau Ballet and the band's long goodbye may have meant it's taken 25 years for him to release more new work on his own. But perhaps INSOLO will help him to put the 1980s to rest, once and for all."

For his part, Kemp confirmed during press promotion for INSOLO that this album signalled the end of any further collaboration with Spandau Ballet. He told Neil McCormick of The Daily Telegraph that "We have no creative energy together, the lead protagonists have no communication, it's just a lie. So it's over. It's over. We are never going to get back together."

The two songs, "In Solo" and "The Haunted", drew inspiration from Edward Hopper's 1932 painting Room in New York.

== Singles and promotion ==
"Ahead of the Game", the first UK single release, was released on 2 April 2021. The video was directed by Charles Lightening. An extended 8 minute 28 second remix was later released.

"Too Much" was the second single, released on 2 June 2021. The video was again directed by Lightening and featured the Royal Ballet soloist Meaghan Grace Hinkis.

The third UK single, "Waiting for the Band", was inspired by David Bowie's the 1980 Floor Show, which the 14-year-old Kemp attended at the Marquee Club in October 1973. The recording features archive London Weekend Television interview clips of Bowie fans outside his 1978 Earl's Court concert. Kemp's brother and former Spandau Ballet bandmate Martin Kemp contributed bass guitar "for the narrative".

"I Remember You" was released in the UK on 5 October 2021.

Kemp recorded a BBC Radio 2 live session for Zoe Ball featuring "Too Much", a cover of Jimmy Webb's "By the Time I Get to Phoenix" and "True".

== Critical reception ==
Professional ratings
Review scores
Source	Rating
The Arts Desk	1/5 stars
Mojo	3/5 stars
Record Collector	3/5 stars
Uncut	6/10

INSOLO received mixed reviews from critics. The Daily Telegraph music critic Neil McCormick wrote that INSOLO "is an intricate, mature and soulful piece of work, which blends [Kemp's] melodic songcraft with luscious arrangements reminiscent of 70s prog rock stylists like Steely Dan and Pink Floyd". David Chiu of Newsweek described it as "eloquent and poignant". The Times' Will Hodgkinson awarded the album a four-star rating, describing it as "nostalgic, wistful and filled with a gloriously romantic sense of despair and futility".

In contrast, in The Times' sister paper The Sunday Times, Lisa Verrico described it as "a perplexing blend of prog guitars, jazzy sax, cinematic strings, French horn and vocals that veer from dramatically breathy to blandly bluesy". John Bungey of Mojo described the album as "1970s–80s AOR, lushly upholstered and hook-laden". He highlighted the title track, "I Am the Past" and "I Remember You" as stand-out tracks, but concluded, "anyone expecting echoes of wayward genius/madman Syd Barrett amid Insolo's smooth contours will be disappointed". Thomas H Green of The Arts Desk called INSOLO "one of the worst albums I've ever heard, showcasing Kemp as the most awful M.O.R indulgent", and "a place where post-Eighties prog rock skitters into West Coast FM radio smoothness, yacht rock, and tepid jazziness" with "clunkily expounded existential narratives".

== Track listing ==
All tracks are written by Gary Kemp.

No.	Title	Length
1.	"In Solo"	6.23
2.	"A Rumour of You"	5.36
3.	"Waiting for the Band"	5.28
4.	"Ahead of the Game"	3.53
5.	"I Remember You"	3.47
6.	"Too Much"	4.15
7.	"The Fastest Man in the World"	4.29
8.	"I Am the Past"	4.36
9.	"The Feet of Mercury"	3.32
10.	"The Haunted"	6.02
11.	"Our Light"	4.06

== Personnel ==
- Gary Kemp - vocals, all guitars (2, 6), programming (1, 3, 4, 5, 7, 8, 9, 10, 11), backing vocals, strings arrangement (1, 3, 6, 7)
- Toby Chapman - piano (1, 10), organ (1, 10), keyboards & programming, backing vocals, strings arrangement (1, 3, 6, 7)
- Guy Pratt - bass (1, 2, 5, 7, 8, 9, 10, 11)
- Ged Lynch - drums (1, 5) & percussion (1, 5, 10)
- Matt Clifford - French horn (1, 6, 8)
- Lee Harris - lap steel (2)
- Martin Kemp - bass (3)
- Theo Travis - saxophone (3)
- Richard Jones - bass (4, 6)
- Ash Soan - drums (4, 7, 8, 10, 11)
- Lily Carassik - trumpet (5)
- Roger Taylor - drums (6)
- Rob Taggart - string arrangement (1, 3, 6, 7)
- Bryony James - cello
- Chris Worsey - cello
- Emma Owens - violas
- Polly Wiltshire - violas
- Emma Parker - violins (leader)
- Glesni Roberts - violins
- Jackie Hartley - violins
- Laura Melhuish - violins
- Richard George - violins
- Cat Parker - violins
- Andy Corns - guitar tech
- Phil Knights - copyist
- Kate Griffiths - archive research
- Malcolm Venville - cover photography

== Charts ==
Chart (2021)	Peak position
UK Albums (OCC)	43
