= Theatres Trust =

National advisory public body in the UK

- Formation: 1976 (by the Theatres Trust Act 1976)
- Legal status: National Advisory Public Body
- Purpose: To offer guidance and advice relating to planning, heritage, regeneration and development, architecture and design which concern theatres.
- Headquarters: The Theatres Trust; 22 Charing Cross Road; London; WC2H 0QL; United Kingdom
- Revenue: From The Theatres Trust Charitable Fund

The Theatres Trust is the National Advisory Public Body for Theatres in the United Kingdom. It was founded in 1976 by an Act of Parliament to "promote the better protection of theatres for the benefit of the nation". The Trust has played a leading role in protecting theatre buildings for the duration of its history. It provides specialist advice to a variety of stakeholders throughout Britain to assist with the promotion and preservation of theatre buildings. The Trust's central aim is to "ensure that current and future generations have access to good quality theatres that reflect our cultural life and offer inspiring places to enjoy theatre". The Trust also holds historical and architectural records of many theatre buildings throughout the United Kingdom, which is made available online as part of a "Theatres Database".

The Trust is administered by The Theatres Trust Charitable Fund, a registered charity under English law.

== Remit ==
Theatres Trust Act 1976 (Note: Section 6(1).)
- Act of Parliament
- Parliament of the United Kingdom
- Long title: An Act to establish a Theatres Trust for the better protection of theatres; and for purposes connected therewith.
- Citation: 1976 c. 27
- Territorial extent: England and Wales; Scotland; (Note: Section 6(4).)

Dates
- Royal assent: 22 July 1976
- Commencement: 21 November 1977 (Note: Section 6(2)–(3). The Theatres Trust Act (Appointed Day) Order 1976 (SI 1976/2236).)

Other legislation
- Amended by: Theatres Trust (Scotland) Act 1978; Government Trading Act 1990; Companies Act 1989 (Eligibility for Appointment as Company Auditor) (Consequential Amendments) Regulations 1991; Scotland Act 1998 (Cross-Border Public Authorities)(Adaptation of Functions etc.) Order 2000; Civil Partnership Act 2004; Companies Act 2006 (Consequential Amendments etc) Order 2008; Charities Act 2011

Status: Amended

Text of statute as originally enacted

Revised text of statute as amended

Text of the Theatres Trust Act 1976 as in force today (including any amendments) within the United Kingdom, from legislation.gov.uk.

The Theatres Trust was established by the Theatres Trust Act 1976 (c. 27) which had a central focus of ensuring "that current and future generations have access to good quality theatres that reflect our cultural life and offer inspiring places to enjoy theatre". The trust offers guidance and advice relating to planning, heritage, regeneration and development, architecture and design which concern theatres.

The trust's remit covers a wide range of buildings which include theatres, old and new, in current use, in other uses, or disused. Notably, it also includes ciné-variety buildings or structures that have been converted to theatre, circus buildings and performing art centres.

The Theatres Trust is a statutory consultee, as defined by the legislation within the Theatres Trust Act 1976 and is accordingly consulted on any planning application or development involving land on which there is a theatre or which will affect theatre use. Consequently, local authorities are legally required to notify the trust when planning applications are submitted that fall within the remit of the trust. Additionally, the trust is consulted on all local development frameworks, planning briefs, area action plans and cultural quarters consultations that relate to cultural and leisure facilities.

Theatres Trust (Scotland) Act 1978 (Note: Section 2(1).)
- Act of Parliament
- Parliament of the United Kingdom
- Long title: An Act to extend the Theatres Trust Act 1976 to Scotland.
- Citation: 1978 c. 24
- Territorial extent: England and Wales; Scotland; (Note: Section 2(2).)

Dates
- Royal assent: 30 June 1978
- Commencement: 30 June 1978 (Note: The Acts of Parliament (Commencement) Act 1793.)

Other legislation
- Amends: Theatres Trust Act 1976

Status: Current legislation

Text of statute as originally enacted

Revised text of statute as amended

Text of the Theatres Trust (Scotland) Act 1978 as in force today (including any amendments) within the United Kingdom, from legislation.gov.uk.

While the Theatres Trust Act 1976 (and with it the trust) originally applied only to England and Wales, it was extended to Scotland by the Theatres Trust (Scotland) Act 1978 (c. 24).

== Resources ==
The Theatres Trust currently offers a number of resources that contribute towards the promotion of the better protection of theatres:

- Ecovenue – A three-year programme which ran from 2009–2012 backed by the European Regional Development Fund to provide 48 theatres in London with specialist theatre environmental advice and help to develop an Environmental Policy.
- Exploring Theatres – An online learning resource, aimed principally at educational establishments which provides information about the history, design and management of theatre in the United Kingdom.
- Theatres Database/Image Library – The Trust maintains a record of the architectural and historic features of around 4,000 theatres past and present throughout the United Kingdom. Additionally, around 1,000 images relating to these theatres, both historical and contemporariness, are made available on the Trust's website.
- Theatre Buildings at Risk – Seeking to mirror English Heritage's Heritage at Risk Register and the Buildings at Risk Register for Scotland, the Theatres Trust annually produces a register of theatre buildings at risk of demolition or closure.
- Advice & Guidance – Clause 2C of the Theatres Trust Act 1976 specifies that the Theatres Trust is able "to maintain or assist in the maintenance of any theatre". This includes the provision of information, advice and guidance. Specialist advice is made available for a wide range of issues which relate to theatres. These include advice on planning applications that relate to the regeneration and development of theatres, theatre design and any other issues relating to wider planning or heritage matters that relate to theatre buildings.

== Publications ==
Theatres Magazine
- Editor-in-chief: Mhora Samuel
- Frequency: Quarterly
- Publisher: The Theatres Trust Charitable Fund
- Founded: 2004
- Country: United Kingdom
- Website: Archive
- ISSN: 1759-7668
- OCLC: 56705260

The Theatres Trust publishes Theatres Magazine (TM) quarterly.

== Membership ==
The Theatres Trust currently employs eight members of staff who perform a variety of tasks to help facilitate the Trust's central remit. The Trust is governed by fifteen trustees who are appointed by the Secretary of State for Culture, Media and Sport. These Trustees are appointed due to their expertise in a wide range of differing areas including theatre management, planning law and the performing arts (who include Penelope Keith and Dara Ó Briain). The Chairman of the Trust is currently Dave Moutrey.

Paragraph 1A of the Schedule to the Theatres Trust Act 1976 requires that "one of the trustees shall be a person who appears to the Secretary of State to have special knowledge of Scotland". The Secretary of State is required to consult the Scottish Ministers before appointing such a trustee.

== Funding ==
The Theatres Trust owns the freeholds of the Garrick, Lyceum and Lyric theatres in London and this is the principal source of its income base. These freeholds were transferred to the trust by the London Residuary Body, following the abolition of the Greater London Council, to protect and ensure the continued operation of the theatres. The rest of its funding is mostly derived from proceeds from events held by the Theatres Trust and donations by supporters.
