= Gary Kemp =

English actor and musician (born 1959)

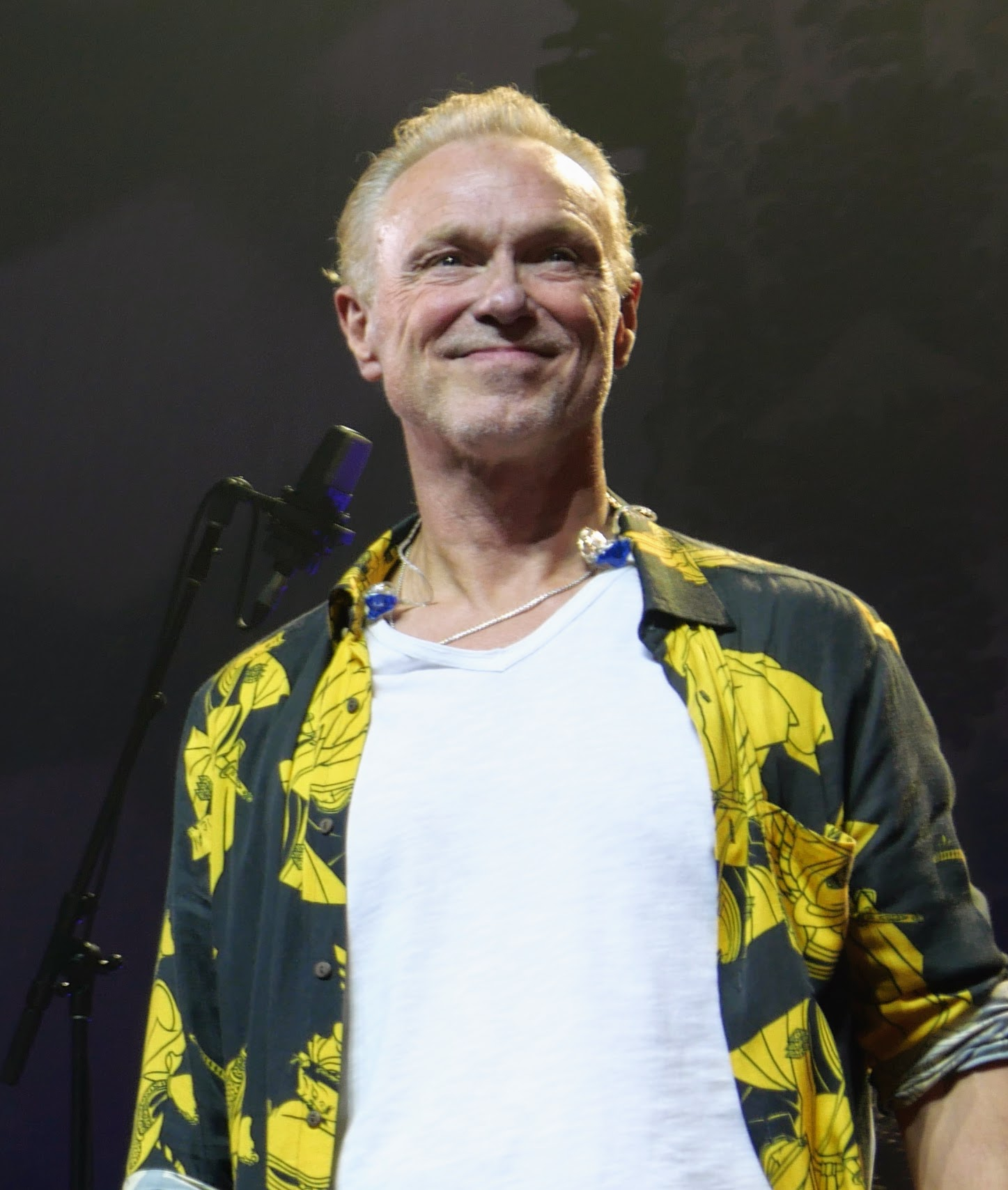
- Kemp in 2022

Background information
- Born: Gary James Kemp; 16 October 1959 (age 67); Smithfield, London, England
- Origin: Islington, London, England
- Genres: New wave; blue-eyed soul; synth-pop; psychedelic rock
- Occupations: Singer; songwriter; musician; actor
- Instruments: Vocals; guitar; synthesiser; drums; piano
- Years active: 1970–present
- Labels: EMI; CBS; Sony BMG; Chrysalis; Universal; Parlophone
- Member of: Nick Mason's Saucerful of Secrets
- Formerly of: Spandau Ballet; Holy Holy
- Spouse: Sadie Frost (m. 1988; div. 1995) Lauren Barber (m. 2003)
- Website: garykemp.com

Gary James Kemp (born 16 October 1959) is an English songwriter, musician and actor, best known as the lead guitarist, backing vocalist, and principal songwriter for the new wave band Spandau Ballet.

Kemp wrote the lyrics and music for all 23 of Spandau Ballet's hit singles, including "To Cut a Long Story Short", "True", "Gold", "Chant No. 1 (I Don't Need This Pressure On)", "Through the Barricades" and "Only When You Leave". Spandau Ballet became one of the biggest British bands of the 1980s, generating over 25 million record sales worldwide. In 2012, Kemp was an Ivor Novello Award winner for Outstanding Song Collection. His brother Martin Kemp plays bass guitar in the band and is also an actor. Since 2018, Kemp has also toured the U.S. and Europe with the psychedelic rock group Nick Mason's Saucerful of Secrets.

== Early life ==
Gary James Kemp was born on 16 October 1959, to parents Eileen née Green and Frank Kemp in St Bartholomew's Hospital, Smithfield, London, within the sound of St Mary-le-Bow's bells and grew up in an Islington Council house in London. Born into a working-class family with paternal roots in the farrier trade. He attended Rotherfield Junior School and Dame Alice Owen's grammar school in Islington and later in the sixth form relocated to Potters Bar. He excelled at mathematics, passing GCE O Level, a year early.

He was active in the Anna Scher Children's Theatre drama club, along with his brother Martin. He acted in various Children's Film Foundation television and film productions beginning with "Junket 89" in 1970, which starred Richard Wilson (later known for One Foot in the Grave). Kemp played the lead role in the 1972 film Hide and Seek alongside Roy Dotrice which was given a Royal premiere for the CFF's 21st anniversary, attended by the Duchess of Kent. Gary was interviewed about his role for Film 72.

Kemp had a love for glam rock and also an interest in progressive rock. His first musical collaboration was with Anna Scher regulars Phil Daniels and Peter Hugo Daly. He performed with them on the children's television show You Must Be Joking! in 1975. Aged 14, Kemp played guitar with Islington-based The Same Band and future Spandau Ballet session keyboard player Ian 'Jess' Bailey.

The first band he formed with Alice Owen's schoolmates Steve Norman, John Keeble and Tony Hadley was called Roots after Kemp and Norman saw the Sex Pistols perform at The Screen on the Green in August 1976. The band changed its name to The Cut then became power pop group The Makers, favourably reviewed by New Musical Express in December 1977. Martin Kemp joined as bass player when they became Gentry in July 1978 before transforming, at the suggestion of Robert Elms into Spandau Ballet and playing live for the first time at Blitz on 5 December 1979. The band's early success was driven by London's burgeoning nightclubbing scene in which Gary Kemp identified Spandau's role: "We are making the most contemporary statement in fashion and music."

== Spandau Ballet ==
After recording Spandau Ballet's final album Heart Like a Sky, in 1989, Kemp and his brother returned to acting. He earned criticism from his fellow band members Tony Hadley, Steve Norman and John Keeble, but received good reviews for his performance as Ronnie Kray in The Krays (1990). The success of this film was the death-knell for Spandau Ballet.

Spandau Ballet played the final live show of their 10th anniversary tour at the Edinburgh Playhouse on 6 March 1990. They would not perform live together again for 19 years.

In 1999, Hadley, Norman and Keeble attempted to sue Kemp for alleged unpaid royalties. They claimed that an agreement had existed between him and the rest of the band, whereby Kemp, who was the main songwriter in the band, would pay his bandmates a share of the royalties earned. The claims were vigorously denied by Kemp; Hadley, Norman and Keeble subsequently lost their court case. Although initially vowing to appeal the verdict, they later decided against this.

After two decades apart the band reformed in 2009 with an announcement on HMS Belfast, venue of one of their earliest secret gigs. Two world tours followed, including five nights at London O2 arena. Their story was documented by the critically acclaimed film Soul Boys of the Western World which premiered at SXSW in 2012 and was screened at film festivals all over the world including Cannes, Rome and NYC Doc.

On 6 June 2018, Spandau Ballet played their first show with new singer Ross William Wild at London's Subterania after Tony Hadley announced on social media that he had left the band. Spandau Ballet subsequently played six European shows in Rome, Milan, Padua, Utrecht and Tilburg with the last of those in London at Eventim Apollo Hammersmith on 29 October 2018. In May 2019 Wild tweeted: "I have formally quit the band Spandau Ballet."

== Nick Mason's Saucerful of Secrets ==
Kemp is a longtime fan of Pink Floyd, and in 2018 he was invited by the band's drummer Nick Mason to contribute guitar and vocals to Mason's psychedelic rock band Saucerful of Secrets, "capturing the spirit" of the early music of Pink Floyd. The band includes Guy Pratt on bass and vocals, Lee Harris on guitar and backing vocals, and Dom Beken on keyboards.

The band made their live debut in May 2018 at Dingwalls in London playing a selection of Pink Floyd material predating their 1973 album, The Dark Side of the Moon. This was followed by three shows at The Half Moon, Putney and a European tour the same year.

In 2019, an extended tour of the US and Canada was announced starting in Vancouver at the Queen Elizabeth Hall on 12 March. This was followed by five additional UK shows set to run from April to May and another European tour in July the same year. Another European tour, the Echoes tour, set to begin in April 2020 was postponed to April 2022 due to the COVID-19 pandemic. A second North American tour was postponed from January 2022 to September.

Kemp also appears on the band's 2020 live album and film, Live at the Roundhouse.

== Other music projects ==
Kemp along with his band Spandau Ballet were part of the "Do they know it's Christmas" song by Band Aid in 1984 along with appearances in the 40th anniversary documentary.

Kemp performed "Through the Barricades" solo in December 1985 at London's Dominion Theatre for the Snowball Review, a fund raiser organised by Pete Townshend for a women's domestic violence charity. He also played it at the Artists Against Apartheid festival at Clapham Common on 28 June 1986.

He released a solo album, Little Bruises, in 1995, on Sony Records produced by Bow Wow Wow member and Malcolm McLaren producer, Leigh Gorman. It was followed by a tour of the UK and Ireland.

Two of his songs appeared on the debut album by American soap star Jacob Young in 2001.

Other musical collaborations include writing music and additional lyrics with Guy Pratt for the musical production Bedbug, lyrics and book by Snoo Wilson, a reimagined adaptation of the Vladimir Mayakovsky play, as part of the Shell Connections Youth Drama in 2004 which was presented at the National Theatre and revived there in 2016. He has written another musical, A Terrible Beauty, also with Pratt and Oscar nominated book writer Shane Connaughton (My Left Foot) based on the life of W. B. Yeats and Maud Gonne.

He released a second solo studio album, INSOLO, in 2021 on Columbia Records produced and mixed by Gary Kemp and keyboards player Toby Chapman.

== Equipment ==
Kemp says his favourite guitar is his Gibson J-45 acoustic.

== Acting career ==
His first adult acting role was playing Ronald Kray in The Krays (1990), with his brother Martin playing Ronald's twin brother Reginald. For research he visited Kray in Broadmoor hospital.

Kemp's first Hollywood movie was The Bodyguard, in 1992, with Whitney Houston and Kevin Costner, directed by Mick Jackson and written by Lawrence Kasdan. He played Sy Spector, Whitney's character Rachel Marron's music business PR.

Other roles include argumentative band leader Jake Woodward in The Larry Sanders Show, in 1993, and Oliver in heist movie, Killing Zoe, directed by Roger Avary and produced by Quentin Tarantino in 1994, as well as Dog Eat Dog, Poppies and American Daylight. He has also had TV roles in Murder in Mind, Murder Investigation Team, and Casualty.

He has continued acting on film, television and stage, taking the role of Serge in the West End production of Art in 2001, Pignight by Snoo Wilson at the Menier Theatre in May 2004 and as corrupt copper PC Collins in the revival of Lionel Bart's musical Fings Ain't Wot They Used T'Be directed by Terry Johnson at Theatre Royal Stratford East with Jessie Wallace in 2014. He played Teddy in The Homecoming, directed by Jamie Lloyd, at Trafalgar Studios in 2015 and appeared in two plays, Party Time/Celebration, from the Pinter at the Pinter season, which staged all 20 of Harold Pinter's one act plays in 2018/2019 with a cast including Anthony Sher, John Simm, Martin Freeman, Tamsin Greig and Danny Dyer.

In January 2008, Kemp appeared on a celebrity special of Who Wants to Be a Millionaire? with his brother Martin, to raise awareness of and funds for the Encephalitis Society. In March 2008, Kemp starred in a low-budget 20-minute short film directed by his brother Martin, entitled Karma Magnet. This was only released online.

== Documentaries ==
In 2014, Kemp co-wrote and presented the documentary Kick Out the Jams for ITV's Perspectives about the arrival of Damien Hirst, Tracey Emin and the YBAs (Young British Artists). He also co-wrote Passions: Mick Ronson by Gary Kemp for Sky Arts in 2017.

He has presented various radio documentaries on David Bowie and guitarist Mick Ronson for BBC Radio 2 and BBC Radio 6.

== Podcast and radio ==
In 2020, Kemp started "Rockonteurs", a podcast hosted with Guy Pratt, who has played as a session bass player with many bands including Pink Floyd. In each episode they interview a well known musician about their life and career.

On 1 August 2021, Kemp appeared on Johnnie Walker's BBC Radio 2 show Sounds of the 70s, choosing tracks which had inspired him, including David Bowie's cover of "See Emily Play" by Pink Floyd, "Debris" by Faces and "In The City" by the Jam. His final choice was "Come All Ye" by Fairport Convention, from their 1969 album Liege & Lief, which he described as "one of the greatest albums ever made."

== Personal life ==
Kemp was married to actress Sadie Frost. They married on 7 May 1988. Their son Finlay was born in 1990. Frost and Kemp were married for five years and then separated, finally divorcing on 19 August 1995. In 2003, Kemp married costume designer Lauren Barber, with whom he has three sons: Milo Wolf (b. 2004), Kit (b. 2009), and Rex (b. 2012). They live in London.

Kemp is a keen cyclist and mountain walker, and a collector of the furniture produced by Edward William Godwin. In 2017, he nominated Godwin for BBC Radio 4's Great Lives show hosted by Matthew Parris.

He became a trustee of the Theatres Trust in 2018. He is also a supporter of Save the Children.

In 2013, Kemp said in an interview that he was a Labour Party voter and had always been a supporter of the party because of his father. He supported David Miliband for the leadership of the party. In 1986, Kemp performed in a show in support of the party at the Manchester Apollo with the collective of musicians Red Wedge, which included Billy Bragg, Johnny Marr and Paul Weller.

Kemp, grew up in the Highbury area of North London and is an Arsenal supporter and season ticket holder.

== Discography ==
=== Studio albums ===
- Little Bruises (4 September 1995), Columbia
- Insolo (2021), Columbia - UK No. 43
- This Destination (2025)

=== Singles ===
- "An Inexperienced Man" (1995), Columbia - UK #82

== Filmography ==
Selected films and television include:

- Junket 89 (1970)
- Jackanory (1971)
- Hide and Seek (1972) as Chris
- You Must Be Joking! (1975)
- Live Aid (1985)
- Ice Pawn (1989) as Misha Orlov
- The Krays (1990) as Ronald Kray
- Paper Marriage (1992) as Aidan Carey
- The Bodyguard (1992) as Sy Spector
- The Larry Sanders Show (1993, TV Series) as Jake Woodward
- Killing Zoe (1993) as Oliver
- Magic Hunter (1994) as Max
- Dog Eat Dog (2001) as Jesus
- American Daylight (2004)
- Casualty (2006–2011, TV Series) as Michael Warwick / Matthew Merriman
- Poppies (2006) as John Brady
- A Voice From Afar (2006) as Actor 1
- Lewis (2012, TV Series) as Tom Garland
- Art Is... (2013) as Collector
- Assassin (2015) as John Alberts
- Molly Moon and the Incredible Book of Hypnotism (2015) as Cregg

== Bibliography ==
Kemp has released an autobiography:

- Kemp, Gary (2009). I Know This Much: From Soho to Spandau. London: Fourth Estate. ISBN 978-0-00-732330-2.
- He has also contributed articles to GQ, The Times and the Evening Standard.
