= The Best of Spandau Ballet =

Greatest hits album by Spandau Ballet
- Released: 16 September 1991
- Recorded: 1980–1989
- Genre: Pop; New wave
- Length: 1:22:20 (LP/Cassette) 1:15:38 (CD)
- Label: Chrysalis
- Producer: Richard James Burgess; Trevor Horn; Tony Swain; Steve Jolley; Spandau Ballet; Gary Langan; Gary Kemp

Spandau Ballet chronology
Heart Like a Sky (1989)	The Best of Spandau Ballet (1991)	The Collection (1997)

Singles from The Best of Spandau Ballet
- 1. "True" Released: 19 August 1991

The Best of Spandau Ballet is a greatest hits album by the English new wave band Spandau Ballet, released on 16 September 1991 by Chrysalis Records. It features most of the band's singles between 1980 and 1989 in chronological order of release. All tracks were taken from the 7-inch singles for each song, which means certain songs are presented in edited form compared to their studio album-versions. The CD version of the compilation omits "She Loved Like Diamond" and "Raw" in order to facilitate a single disc release.

== Critical reception ==
The editors of Music Week wrote, "'True' and all the rest sounding pretty strong when collected together."

== Commercial performance ==
The Best of Spandau Ballet peaked at number 44 on the UK Albums Chart. It also reached number 15 in the Netherlands and number 41 in Australia.

== Track listing ==
=== LP version ===
All tracks are written by Gary Kemp and taken from the 7" single recordings.

Side one
No.	Title	Original album	Length
1.	"To Cut a Long Story Short" (*)	Journeys to Glory (1981)	3:21
2.	"The Freeze"	Journeys to Glory (1981)	3:31
3.	"Muscle Bound"	Journeys to Glory (1981)	3:54
4.	"Chant No. 1 (I Don't Need This Pressure On)" (*)	Diamond (1982)	4:04
5.	"Paint Me Down" (*)	Diamond (1982)	3:42
Total length:			18:32

Side two
No.	Title	Original album	Length
6.	"She Loved Like Diamond" (*)	Diamond (1982)	2:55
7.	"Instinction" (#)	Diamond (1982)	3:33
8.	"Lifeline"	True (1983)	3:19
9.	"Communication"	True (1983)	3:25
10.	"True"	True (1983)	5:32
Total length:			18:44

Side three
No.	Title	Original album	Length
11.	"Gold"	True (1983)	3:50
12.	"Only When You Leave"	Parade (1984)	4:47
13.	"I'll Fly for You"	Parade (1984)	5:10
14.	"Highly Strung" (*)	Parade (1984)	4:10
15.	"Round and Round"	Parade (1984)	4:32
Total length:			22:29

Side four
No.	Title	Original album	Length
16.	"Fight for Ourselves" (*)	Through the Barricades (1986)	4:22
17.	"Through the Barricades"	Through the Barricades (1986)	5:16
18.	"How Many Lies?" (*)	Through the Barricades (1986)	4:34
19.	"Raw" (*)	Heart Like a Sky (1989)	3:47
20.	"Be Free with Your Love" (*)(#)	Heart Like a Sky (1989)	4:36
Total length:			22:35

*Same version also released on original album
#Same version also released on 12" single

=== CD version ===
No.	Title	Length
1.	"To Cut a Long Story Short"	3:21
2.	"The Freeze"	3:31
3.	"Muscle Bound"	3:54
4.	"Chant No. 1 (I Don't Need This Pressure On)"	4:04
5.	"Paint Me Down"	3:42
6.	"Instinction"	3:33
7.	"Lifeline"	3:19
8.	"Communication"	3:25
9.	"True"	5:32
10.	"Gold"	3:50
11.	"Only When You Leave"	4:47
12.	"I'll Fly for You"	5:10
13.	"Highly Strung"	4:10
14.	"Round and Round"	4:32
15.	"Fight for Ourselves"	4:22
16.	"Through the Barricades"	5:16
17.	"How Many Lies?"	4:34
18.	"Be Free with Your Love"	4:36
Total length:		1:15:38

== Charts ==
Chart performance for The Best of Spandau Ballet
Chart (1991–1992)	Peak position
Australian Albums (ARIA)	41
Dutch Albums (Album Top 100)	15
UK Albums (OCC)	44
