= Gold: The Best of Spandau Ballet =

Greatest hits album by Spandau Ballet
- Released: 4 September 2000
- Recorded: 1980–1989
- Genre: New wave
- Length: 1:10:46 (Version 1); 1:16:18 (Version 2)
- Label: Chrysalis
- Producer: Richard James Burgess; Trevor Horn; Tony Swain; Steve Jolley; Spandau Ballet; Gary Langan; Gary Kemp

Spandau Ballet chronology
The Collection (1997)	Gold: The Best of Spandau Ballet (2000)	Once More (2009)

Gold: The Best of Spandau Ballet is a greatest hits album by the English new wave band Spandau Ballet, released on 4 September 2000 by Chrysalis Records. Two versions of the compilation were offered, each with the same 16 of their biggest hits; however, one version also included 1982's "She Loved Like Diamond" while the other featured their late 80s singles "Raw" and "Be Free with Your Love" instead. The album was re-released on 17 August 2008 with a bonus music video DVD.

== Commercial performance ==
Gold: The Best of Spandau Ballet peaked at number 7 on the UK Albums Chart. It also reached number 10 in Scotland, number 30 in Sweden, number 34 on the European Top 100 Albums chart, number 38 in Italy, number 40 in the Netherlands and Spain, number 44 in Ireland and number 158 in Australia.

== Critical reception ==
Professional ratings
Review scores
Source	Rating
AllMusic	4.5/5 stars

Ned Raggett of AllMusic gave the compilation four-and-a-half stars out of five but wrote, "From 20 years' worth of perspective, the earliest songs sound astoundingly ham-handed," and that "nearly everything sounds like it served the videos rather than vice versa." He did, however, conclude that "Gold is all most casual fans will ever need or want."

== Track listing ==
All tracks are written by Gary Kemp and taken from the 7" single recordings, except as noted.

Version 1
No.	Title	Original album	Length
1.	"Gold"	True (1983)	3:55
2.	"True"	True (1983)	5:40
3.	"Only When You Leave"	Parade (1984)	4:48
4.	"Lifeline" (*)	True (1983)	3:33
5.	"Communication"	True (1983)	3:27
6.	"Instinction" (**)	Diamond (1982)	3:39
7.	"Chant No. 1 (I Don't Need This Pressure On)" (#)	Diamond (1982)	4:09
8.	"To Cut a Long Story Short" (#)	Journeys to Glory (1981)	3:22
9.	"The Freeze"	Journeys to Glory (1981)	3:33
10.	"Muscle Bound"	Journeys to Glory (1981)	3:56
11.	"Paint Me Down" (#)	Diamond (1982)	3:47
12.	"She Loved Like Diamond" (#)	Diamond (1982)	2:55
13.	"Round and Round"	Parade (1984)	4:34
14.	"Highly Strung" (#)	Parade (1984)	4:11
15.	"Fight for Ourselves" (#)	Through the Barricades (1986)	4:24
16.	"I'll Fly for You"	Parade (1984)	5:14
17.	"Through the Barricades"	Through the Barricades (1986)	5:57
Total length:			1:10:46

Version 2
No.	Title	Original album	Length
1.	"Gold"	True (1983)	3:55
2.	"True"	True (1983)	5:40
3.	"Only When You Leave"	Parade (1984)	4:48
4.	"Lifeline" (*)	True (1983)	3:33
5.	"Communication"	True (1983)	3:27
6.	"Instinction" (**)	Diamond (1982)	3:39
7.	"Chant No. 1 (I Don't Need This Pressure On)" (#)	Diamond (1982)	4:09
8.	"To Cut a Long Story Short" (#)	Journeys to Glory (1981)	3:22
9.	"The Freeze"	Journeys to Glory (1981)	3:33
10.	"Muscle Bound"	Journeys to Glory (1981)	3:56
11.	"Paint Me Down" (#)	Diamond (1982)	3:47
12.	"Raw" (#)	Heart Like a Sky (1989)	3:48
13.	"Round and Round"	Parade (1984)	4:34
14.	"Highly Strung" (#)	Parade (1984)	4:11
15.	"Fight for Ourselves" (#)	Through the Barricades (1986)	4:24
16.	"I'll Fly for You"	Parade (1984)	5:14
17.	"Be Free with Your Love" (**)(#)	Heart Like a Sky (1989)	4:39
18.	"Through the Barricades"	Through the Barricades (1986)	5:57
Total length:			1:16:18

*Album version
**Same version also released on 12" single
#Same version also released on original album

== Charts ==
Chart performance for Gold: The Best of Spandau Ballet
Chart (2000–2001)	Peak position
Australian Albums (ARIA)	158
Dutch Albums (Album Top 100)	40
European Albums (Music & Media)	34
Irish Albums (IRMA)	44
Italian Albums (FIMI)	38
Scottish Albums (OCC)	10
Spanish Albums (AFYVE)	40
Swedish Albums (Sverigetopplistan)	30
UK Albums (OCC)	7

== Certifications ==
Certifications for Gold: The Best of Spandau Ballet
Region	Certification	Certified units/sales
Spain (Promusicae)	Gold	50,000^{^}
United Kingdom (BPI)	Platinum	300,000^{^}
^{^} Shipments figures based on certification alone.
