= The Collection (Spandau Ballet album) =

Compilation album by Spandau Ballet
- Released: 14 April 1997
- Recorded: 1980–1984, 1988
- Genre: New wave
- Length: 59:03
- Label: EMI

Spandau Ballet chronology
The Best of Spandau Ballet (1991)	The Collection (1997)	Gold: The Best of Spandau Ballet (2000)

The Collection is a compilation album by Spandau Ballet. It was released in 1997 by EMI. William Ruhlmann of AllMusic wrote that there was "no discernible selection criterion" used to decide which songs would be on it and described it as "a seemingly random collection of Spandau Ballet performances, including various singles, LP tracks, live recordings, and remixes in no particular order." In 2001 it was reissued by the Dutch reissue label Disky.

== Critical reception ==
Professional ratings
1999 release
Review scores
Source	Rating
Allmusic	2.5/5 stars

Professional ratings
2001 reissue
Review scores
Source	Rating
Allmusic	2/5 stars

Ruhlmann summarized, "Some of the band's better material is here, some isn't," warning potential buyers that the studio versions of their biggest U.S. chart entries were not included. He decided, "If there is any organizing principle, it seems to be danceability, since, at least until near the end, all of the tracks maintain a steady beat." His AllMusic colleague Bradley Torreano also noted that their biggest hit, "True", was missing and was less kind:

What is in its place is some of the most soulless soul music that was ever thrust upon the listening public; songs like "Reformation" and "Foundation" are devoid of the emotion and power that this sort of music needs to survive. Singer Tony Hadley tries his hardest to give the album a heart, but the crisp production style leaves out the minor blemishes that makes this genre as good as it is. The new wave/soul combination disappeared with the decade, leaving behind some interesting music but obviously missing the essential elements that keeps certain kinds of music around longer than others. And Spandau Ballet is the perfect model for that situation; they had a few interesting songs but did not have the staying power of their techno-minded contemporaries, thus as the decade ended, so did their career. This album is a sad testimonial to a band and a genre that were never that great to begin with.

== Track listing ==
All tracks are written by Gary Kemp.

No.	Title	Original album or single	Length
1.	"To Cut a Long Story Short"	Journeys to Glory (1981)	3:22
2.	"Paint Me Down"	Diamond (1982)	3:44
3.	"The Freeze"	Journeys to Glory (1981)	3:33
4.	"She Loved Like Diamond"	Diamond (1982)	2:54
5.	"Lifeline"	True (1983)	3:21
6.	"Gold" (live, edited version*)	12" single (1983)	4:05
7.	"Coffee Club" (remix)	Diamond – 12" box set (1982)	6:47
8.	"Foundation" (live)	"Gold" – 12" single (1983)	3:56
9.	"Highly Re-Strung" (remix)	12" single (1984)	5:29
10.	"Reformation"	Journeys to Glory (1981)	4:54
11.	"Pleasure"	True (1983)	3:31
12.	"Nature of the Beast"	Parade (1984)	5:15
13.	"Innocence and Science"	Diamond (1982)	4:26
14.	"Raw"	Heart Like a Sky (1989)	3:46
Total length:			59:03

*the first verse is not included
