= Crashed Into Love =

Single by Spandau Ballet

from the album Heart Like a Sky
- B-side: "How Many Lies (live)"
- Released: 12 February 1990
- Recorded: 1988–1989
- Length: 4:40
- Label: CBS
- Songwriter: Gary Kemp
- Producers: Gary Kemp; Gary Langan; Spandau Ballet

Spandau Ballet singles chronology
"Empty Spaces" (1989)	"Crashed Into Love" (1990)	"Once More" (2009)

"Crashed Into Love" is a song by the English new wave band Spandau Ballet, released as the fourth single from their 1989 album Heart Like a Sky. It was poorly received and became their fourth consecutive single that failed to make the top 40 in the UK.

== Background ==
"Crashed Into Love" is the source for the parent album's name, Heart Like a Sky, which references lyrics sung during the first verse.

The music video for "Crashed Into Love" was filmed in Los Angeles.

== Commercial performance ==
"Crashed Into Love" debuted on the UK Singles Chart on 24 February 1990 in its peak position at number 96. It also reached number 28 in Italy.

== Critical reception ==
In his review of the single, Phil Cheeseman of Record Mirror wrote, "No matter how they slipped up on their last record or perhaps, with hindsight, didn't release the best version, they always manage to create a new record even more unspeakable."

== Track listings ==
- 7-inch single

A. "Crashed Into Love" – 4:40
B. "How Many Lies" (live) – 5:00

- 12-inch single

A. "Crashed Into Love" – 4:40
B1. "How Many Lies" (live) – 5:00
B2. "Through the Barricades" (live) – 6:38

- CD single

A. "Crashed Into Love" – 4:40
B. "How Many Lies" (live) – 5:00
C. "Through the Barricades" (live) – 6:38

- Gatefold 12-inch single

A. "Crashed Into Love" – 4:40
B1. "With the Pride/Gold" (live) – 7:52
B2. "True" (live) – 5:58

== Charts ==
Weekly chart performance for "Crashed Into Love"
Chart (1990)	Peak position
Italy (Musica e dischi)	28
UK Singles (OCC)	96

== Bibliography ==
- Hadley, Tony (2004). To Cut a Long Story Short. London: Sidgwick & Jackson. ISBN 978-0-283-07386-1.
- Kemp, Gary (2009). I Know This Much: From Soho to Spandau. London: Fourth Estate. ISBN 978-0-00-732330-2.
