= Empty Spaces (Spandau Ballet song) =

Single by Spandau Ballet

from the album Heart Like a Sky
- B-side: "Fight for Ourselves (live)"
- Released: 13 November 1989
- Recorded: 1988–1989
- Length: 3:57
- Label: CBS
- Songwriter: Gary Kemp
- Producers: Gary Kemp; Gary Langan; Spandau Ballet

Spandau Ballet singles chronology
| "Be Free with Your Love" (1989) | "Empty Spaces" (1989) | "Crashed Into Love" (1990) |

"Empty Spaces" is a song by the English new wave band Spandau Ballet, released as the third single from their 1989 album Heart Like a Sky. It was poorly received and became their third consecutive single that failed to make the top 40 in the UK.

== Background ==
While Kemp had recently begun a romance with his eventual wife, actress Sadie Frost, who he credits with inspiring his songwriting for the Heart Like a Sky album, "Empty Spaces" was actually a song Kemp wrote about the end of his relationship with his previous girlfriend. During recording, Hadley felt pressure from Kemp about the quality of his vocals to the point that Kemp eventually demanded to split the vocals with him. Hadley responded, "I'm the lead singer of this fucking band. Now fuck off."

== Release and commercial performance ==
"Empty Spaces" was released in the UK in November 1989. It debuted on the UK Singles Chart in its peak position at number 94.

== Critical reception ==
Number One's guest critic Taylor Dayne gave "Empty Spaces" two-and-a-half stars out of five. She described it as "a bit bland" and felt that it "isn't really going anywhere".

== Track listings ==
- 7-inch single

A. "Empty Spaces" – 3:57
B. "Fight for Ourselves" (live) – 7:25

- 12-inch single

A. "Empty Spaces" – 3:57
B1. "Chant No. 1" (live) – 4:27
B2. "Fight for Ourselves" (live) – 7:25

- CD single

A. "Empty Spaces" – 3:57
B. "With the Pride/Gold" (live) – 7:52
C. "Chant No. 1" (live) – 4:27

- Picture CD single

A. "Empty Spaces" – 3:57
B. "With the Pride/Gold" (live) – 7:52
C. "True" (live) – 5:58

== Charts ==
Weekly chart performance for "Empty Spaces"
| Chart (1989) | Peak position |
|---|---|
| UK Singles (OCC) | 94 |

== Bibliography ==
- Kemp, Gary (2009). I Know This Much: From Soho to Spandau. London: Fourth Estate. ISBN 978-0-00-732330-2.
