= Big Feeling =

Big Feeling may refer to:

- Big Feeling, a 2003 album by Susan Aglukark
- "Big Feeling", a 1989 song by Spandau Ballet from the album Heart Like a Sky
