= Tears Are Not Enough (ABC song) =

Single by ABC

from the album The Lexicon of Love
- B-side: "Alphabet Soup"
- Released: 16 October 1981
- Recorded: 1981
- Genre: Disco; funk; synth-pop; new pop
- Length: 3:31
- Label: Neutron; Vertigo
- Songwriters: Martin Fry; Mark White; Stephen Singleton; Mark Lickley; David Robinson
- Producer: Steve Brown

ABC singles chronology
"Tears Are Not Enough" (1981)	"Poison Arrow" (1982)

Official audio
- "Tears Are Not Enough" on YouTube

"Tears Are Not Enough" is the debut single by the English pop band ABC. It was released on 16 October 1981 on two formats (7" and 12"). The two singles versions of the song are both different from the version on their debut studio album, The Lexicon of Love (1982). Originally produced by Steve Brown, it was remixed for the album by Trevor Horn.

The song was ranked at number 7 among the ten best "Tracks of the Year" for 1981 by NME. The single peaked at No. 19 on the UK singles chart. In the US, "Tears Are Not Enough" was later released as the B-side of "Poison Arrow".

== Track listing ==
7" Neutron/Phonogram; NT 101

1. "Tears Are Not Enough" – 3:35
2. "Alphabet Soup" – 5:25

12" Neutron/Phonogram; NTX 101

1. "Tears Are Not Enough" – 7:55
2. "Alphabet Soup" – 8:02

== Chart performance ==
Chart (1981)	Peak position
UK singles chart	19
