= The Lexicon of Love =

1982 studio album by ABC

Studio album by ABC
- Released: 21 June 1982
- Recorded: 1981–1982
- Studios: Sarm East (London); Abbey Road (London); Townhouse (London); RAK (London); Good Earth (London)
- Genres: Disco; pop; new wave; sophisti-pop; dance-pop; blue-eyed soul; synth-pop; lounge
- Length: 37:25
- Label: Neutron
- Producers: Trevor Horn; Steve Brown

ABC chronology
The Lexicon of Love (1982)	Beauty Stab (1983)

Singles from The Lexicon of Love
- 1. "Tears Are Not Enough" Released: 16 October 1981; 2. "Poison Arrow" Released: 5 February 1982; 3. "The Look of Love" Released: 7 May 1982; 4. "All of My Heart" Released: 27 August 1982; 5. "Valentine's Day" Released: 1982 (Japan only)

The Lexicon of Love is the debut studio album by the English pop band ABC. Released on 21 June 1982 by Neutron Records, it entered the UK Albums Chart at number one, also topping the New Zealand and Finnish charts. Certified gold in the US, it went platinum in the UK where four singles reached the top 20; "Tears Are Not Enough", "Poison Arrow", "The Look of Love" and "All of My Heart", which Pitchfork ranked number one on their "Now That's What I Call New Pop!" list.

The album has frequently been ranked as one of the greatest albums of the 1980s, and was included in the 2018 edition of Robert Dimery's book 1001 Albums You Must Hear Before You Die.

== Background, recording and release ==
ABC was formed by Stephen Singleton and Mark White as electronic band Vice Versa. Joined by Martin Fry, the band eventually morphed into ABC, with Fry as lead vocalist. A debut single, "Tears Are Not Enough", followed in 1981; it was remixed by record producer Trevor Horn for inclusion in The Lexicon of Love. The album's title originated in the headline of an NME review of an ABC gig.

The group set out to create an album that merged their disco and post-punk influences. "I loved the strings on Chic records, and the whole soundscape of Earth, Wind & Fire", Fry said. "Fusing that with the likes of the Cure and Joy Division was what we were after." The band also sought to blend the sentimentality of mid-20th century show tunes with a distinctly modern songwriting aesthetic. Fry was enamoured by contemporary synth-pop acts such as Gary Numan and OMD, but elected to pursue an alternate lyrical approach to those artists' often technology-based themes: "I wanted to take my songs to a more emotional level, along the lines of Rodgers and Hammerstein or Cole Porter. At that time, there were few songs about really loving or hating someone." Although the 10 tracks on The Lexicon of Love address romantic experiences, Fry has denied that the record is a concept album.

Songs were written collectively by the band, with arranger and orchestrator Anne Dudley also given a credit on some tracks. The majority of the album was recorded at Sarm East Studios in London, with additional work done at Abbey Road, Townhouse, RAK and Good Earth studios. Produced by Horn and engineered by Gary Langan, it features programming of the recently developed Fairlight CMI by J. J. Jeczalik. Horn says that he convinced the band to replace their bassist, Mark Lickley, with Brad Lang. "I talked them into getting a better bass player, which maybe wasn't a kind thing to do", he said, "[but] Brad Lang was quite brilliant".

A year after its release, Horn, Langan, Dudley and Jeczalik formed the Art of Noise, and most of the production team and session musicians on the album formed the basis for ZTT Records. The cover photograph is by Gered Mankowitz. Distribution in the US and Japan was handled by Mercury Records; Vertigo Records released it in Canada and Europe.

== Musical style ==
The Lexicon of Love has been described as disco, pop, new wave, sophisti-pop, dance-pop, blue-eyed soul, synth-pop, and lounge, as well as part of the new pop movement.

== Performance, tours and further releases ==
"Tears Are Not Enough" (in its initial release produced by Steve Brown), "All of My Heart", "Poison Arrow" and "The Look of Love" were all top-20 entries in the UK; the latter two also charted in the US, peaking at No. 25 and No. 18 respectively. The album reached No. 1 on the UK charts and peaked at No. 24 in the US charts.

The band was augmented by session musicians, and the 11-piece ensemble toured Europe, the US and Japan. The shows at Hammersmith Odeon in November 1982 were recorded for inclusion in the band's film Mantrap which was released the following year. In 2004, a two-disc deluxe reissue including previously unreleased outtakes and early demos and a live performance of the album from 1982 was released by Neutron Records.

In 2009, ABC (with Fry as its sole member) performed the entire album at the Royal Albert Hall in London, accompanied by the BBC Concert Orchestra and conducted by Dudley. They were joined onstage by Horn. The Lexicon of Love was again performed live in its entirety on 18 December 2012 at the Theatre Royal, Drury Lane to mark its 30th anniversary. Dudley reprised her role as conductor, performing with the Southbank Sinfonia Orchestra, and they concluded a four-date mini-tour at the same venue on 30 March 2014. Between 4 and 9 November 2015, the band and orchestra also performed at Liverpool's Philharmonic Hall, Glasgow Royal Concert Hall, Sheffield City Hall, the Theatre Royal, Drury Lane in London and Symphony Hall, Birmingham.

A sequel studio album, The Lexicon of Love II, was released on 27 May 2016. A Blu-ray audio disc with new Dolby Atmos and 5.1 surround sound Blu-ray remixes by Steven Wilson, as well as a remastered vinyl edition of the original mix, was released in August 2023.

== Critical reception ==
Professional ratings
Review scores
Source	Rating
AllMusic	5/5 stars
Blender	4/5 stars
Christgau's Record Guide	A−
The Encyclopedia of Popular Music	5/5 stars
Mojo	4/5 stars
Q	5/5 stars
Rolling Stone	4/5 stars
The Rolling Stone Album Guide	4/5 stars
Select	4/5
Spin Alternative Record Guide	9/10
The Great Rock Discography	9/10

The album entered the UK Albums Chart at number 1 and remained on the charts for 50 weeks. It was the fourth biggest selling album in the UK in 1982. Mitchell Cohen of Creem contemporaneously declared it to be a "piece of sumptuous kitsch", adding that "the whole shebang is so florid, so exaggerated, so damned catchy – you want to hear "The Look of Love" a second time before it's even half over; it's a casserole of about forty different pop hits and advertising jingles – that you may feel guilty for falling for it." Robert Christgau gave the album an "A–" rating, writing that "Martin Fry's candid camp and ad-man phrasing don't fully justify his histrionic flights, but they do give him room to be clever, which is clearly his calling--some of these synthetic funk rhythms make me laugh out loud, and he's an ace jingle writer". Don Waller of the Los Angeles Times praised the album, stating that Horn "deserves a share of the applause, but the songs – credited to all four ABC members – are the real deal: apocalyptic, widescreen romances with more hooks than a meat-packing plant." Waller proclaimed that "Tears Are Not Enough", "Poison Arrow" and "The Look of Love (Part I)" call out for "any one of a dozen contemporary black vocalists". "ABC's biggest drawback is Martin Fry's singing, which borders on the effete," he wrote.

Ken Tucker of The Philadelphia Inquirer was less enthusiastic, dismissing the album as "prissy dance music, light on the beat and heavy on the sort of maundering crooning that the effete English rock musicians frequently mistake for passion."

Retrospectively, AllMusic found Horn's production to be "dense and noisy, but frequently beautiful", while "the group's emotional songs gave it a depth and coherence later Horn works (...) would lack." The site praised the band for "[using] the sound to create moving dance-floor epics like "Many Happy Returns" which, like most of the album's tracks, deserved to be a hit single." In a BBC review of the 2004 Deluxe Edition, Rob Webb stated that "The Lexicon of Love stands as a landmark album in British pop", and "underpins just what a sharp band ABC were: witty, lyrical and very, very funky". He found each song to be "a love affair in miniature: some are touching ("All of My Heart", "Show Me"), others a bitter invective at misplaced passion ("Many Happy Returns")", and concluded that "[dance] music had rarely been so literate."

In The Encyclopedia of Popular Music, Colin Larkin awarded the "superb" album 5 stars (outstanding). Lauding the "pristine pop songs", he declared that it "remains a benchmark of 80s pop, and a formidable collection of melodramatic love songs assembled in one neat package." In a review of a 2005 retrospective of Trevor Horn's work, Pitchfork concluded: "If you don't already own the original records, all can be found cheap and all (especially ABC's Lexicon of Love) are essential documents of their era".

== Legacy ==
The Lexicon of Love was ranked as the 4th best album of the 1980s by Record Mirror in December 1989. NME ranked it at number 15 on their "Greatest Albums: The 1980's" in 1993, and at number 117 on their "The Greatest albums of all time" in 2013. Record Collector included it on their list "70 Landmark Albums" in 2019. Observer Music Monthly ranked it at number 42 on their "Greatest British Albums" in 2004. In 2024, Uncut placed it at number 26 on their list "The 500 Greatest Albums of the 1980's".

== Track listing ==
Side one
No.	Title	Writer(s)	Length
1.	"Show Me"	Martin Fry; Mark White; Stephen Singleton; David Palmer	4:02
2.	"Poison Arrow"	Fry; White; Singleton; Palmer; Mark Lickley	3:24
3.	"Many Happy Returns"	Fry; White; Singleton; Palmer	3:56
4.	"Tears Are Not Enough"	Fry; White; Singleton; Lickley; David Robinson	3:31
5.	"Valentine's Day"	Fry; White; Singleton; Palmer	3:42

Side two
No.	Title	Writer(s)	Length
6.	"The Look of Love" (part one)	Fry; White; Singleton; Palmer; Lickley	3:26
7.	"Date Stamp"	Fry; White; Singleton; Palmer	3:51
8.	"All of My Heart"	Fry; White; Singleton; Palmer	5:12
9.	"4 Ever 2 Gether"	Fry; White; Singleton; Palmer; Anne Dudley	5:30
10.	"The Look of Love" (part four)	Fry; White; Singleton; Palmer; Lickley	1:02
Total length:			37:25

1996 digitally remastered edition
No.	Title	Writer(s)	Length
11.	"Tears Are Not Enough" (demo)	Fry; White; Singleton; Lickley; Robinson	3:29
12.	"Poison Arrow" (jazz re-mix)	Fry; White; Singleton; Palmer; Lickley	6:54
13.	"The Look of Love" (US special remix – edit (Note: Mislabeled as 1990 remix. Also known as "The Look of Love (Part 5)".))	Fry; White; Singleton; Palmer; Lickley	5:43
14.	"Alphabet Soup" (12" mix)	Fry; White; Singleton; Lickley; Robinson	8:02
15.	"Theme from Mantrap"	Fry; White; Singleton; Palmer; Lickley	4:19
16.	"The Look of Love" (live)	Fry; White; Singleton; Palmer; Lickley	6:07

1998 reissue
No.	Title	Writer(s)	Length
11.	"Theme from Mantrap"	Fry; White; Singleton; Palmer; Lickley	4:19

=== 2004 deluxe edition ===
CD1 – Part 2: The Original Singles
No.	Title	Writer(s)	Length
11.	"Overture"	Fry; White; Singleton; Palmer; Dudley	3:59
12.	"Tears Are Not Enough" (original single version)	Fry; White; Singleton; Lickley; Robinson	3:36
13.	"Alphabet Soup"	Fry; White; Singleton; Lickley; Robinson	8:03
14.	"Theme from Man Trap"	Fry; White; Singleton; Palmer; Lickley	4:19
15.	"Poison Arrow" (North American jazz mix)	Fry; White; Singleton; Palmer; Lickley	7:06

CD1 – Part 3: An Oddity and An Out-Take
No.	Title	Writer(s)	Length
16.	"Into the Valley of the Heathen Go"	Fry; White; Singleton; Palmer	2:00
17.	"Alphabet Soup" (BBC Swapshop version)	Fry; White; Singleton; Lickley; Robinson	3:13

CD2 – Part 4: The Route to the Lexicon
No.	Title	Writer(s)	Length
1.	"Tears Are Not Enough" (Phonogram demo, 20 July 1981)	Fry; White; Singleton; Lickley; Robinson	3:32
2.	"Show Me" (Phonogram demo, 20 July 1981)	Fry; White; Singleton; Palmer	4:03
3.	"Surrender" (Phonogram demo, 20 July 1981)	Fry; White; Singleton; Palmer	3:29

CD2 – Part 5: The Lexicon of Love, Live at Hammersmith Odeon, November 1982
No.	Title	Writer(s)	Length
4.	"Overture"	Fry; White; Singleton; Palmer; Dudley	3:56
5.	"Show Me"	Fry; White; Singleton; Palmer	4:21
6.	"Many Happy Returns"	Fry; White; Singleton; Palmer	7:02
7.	"Tears Are Not Enough"	Fry; White; Singleton; Palmer; Lickley; Robinson	5:33
8.	"Date Stamp"	Fry; White; Singleton; Palmer	7:07
9.	"The Look of Love"	Fry; White; Singleton; Palmer; Lickley	5:59
10.	"All of My Heart"	Fry; White; Singleton; Palmer	6:45
11.	"Valentine's Day"	Fry; White; Singleton; Palmer	4:44
12.	"4 Ever 2 Gether"	Fry; White; Singleton; Palmer; Dudley	6:53
13.	"Alphabet Soup"	Fry; White; Singleton; Palmer; Lickley; Robinson	8:26
14.	"Poison Arrow"	Fry; White; Singleton; Palmer; Lickley	5:22

== Personnel ==
ABC

- Martin Fry – lead and backing vocals
- Mark White – keyboards, guitars, backing vocals (6)
- Stephen Singleton – alto saxophone, tenor saxophone
- Mark Lickley – bass guitar (2, 4, 6)
- David Palmer – drums, Linn LM-1 programming, percussion
- David Robinson – drums on the single and demo versions of "Tears Are Not Enough"

Additional personnel

- Anne Dudley – keyboards, orchestrations
- J. J. Jeczalik – Fairlight CMI programming
- Brad Lang – bass guitar
- Luís Jardim (misspelled as "Louis Jardin" on album notes) – additional percussion
- Andy Gray – trombone (4)
- Kim Wear – trumpet
- John Thirkell – trumpet (2, 6), flugelhorn (2, 6)
- Gaynor Sadler – harp
- Karen Clayton – female speaking voice (2)
- Tessa Webb – female lead vocal (7)

Production and artwork

- Trevor Horn – producer
- Gary Langan – engineer
- Howard Gray – assistant engineer
- Gered Mankowitz – film photography
- Paul Cox – band photography
- Pete Bill – cover photography
- Visible Inc. – design
- Neutron Records – design

2004 deluxe edition credits

- Gary Moore – digital remastering
- Daryl Easlea – album coordinator, compiler
- Martin Fry – compiler
- Deluxe Graphics@Green Ink – artwork restoration, adaption

== Charts ==
=== Weekly charts ===
Weekly chart performance for The Lexicon of Love
Chart (1982–1983)	Peak position
Australian Albums (Kent Music Report)	9
Canada Top Albums/CDs (RPM)	3
Dutch Albums (Album Top 100)	16
Finnish Albums (Suomen virallinen lista)	1
German Albums (Offizielle Top 100)	23
Japanese Albums (Oricon)	17
New Zealand Albums (RMNZ)	1
Norwegian Albums (VG-lista)	13
Swedish Albums (Sverigetopplistan)	3
UK Albums (Official Charts)	1
US Billboard 200	24

=== Year-end charts ===
1982 year-end chart performance for The Lexicon of Love
Chart (1982)	Position
Australian Albums (Kent Music Report)	29
Canada Top Albums/CDs (RPM)	22
New Zealand Albums (RMNZ)	12
UK Albums (BMRB)	4

1983 year-end chart performance for The Lexicon of Love
Chart (1983)	Position
Canada Top Albums/CDs (RPM)	43
US Billboard 200	42

== Certifications ==
Certifications for The Lexicon of Love
Region	Certification	Certified units/sales
Australia (ARIA)	Gold	20,000^{^}
Canada (Music Canada)	Platinum	100,000^{^}
Finland (Musiikkituottajat)	Gold	48,000
New Zealand (RMNZ)	Platinum	15,000^{^}
United Kingdom (BPI)	Platinum	300,000^{^}
United States (RIAA)	Gold	500,000^{^}
^{^} Shipments figures based on certification alone.
