= Heart Like a Sky =

Studio album by Spandau Ballet
- Released: 18 September 1989
- Recorded: 1988–1989
- Studios: Westside, The Town House, AIR, Olympic and Mayfair (London)
- Genre: Pop
- Length: 39:30
- Label: CBS
- Producers: Gary Kemp; Gary Langan; Spandau Ballet

Spandau Ballet chronology
Through the Barricades (1986)	Heart Like a Sky (1989)	The Best of Spandau Ballet (1991)

Singles from Heart Like a Sky
- 1. "Raw" Released: 22 August 1988; 2. "Be Free with Your Love" Released: 14 August 1989; 3. "Empty Spaces" Released: 13 November 1989; 4. "Crashed Into Love" Released: 12 February 1990

Heart Like a Sky is the sixth studio album by the English new wave band Spandau Ballet, released on 18 September 1989 by CBS Records. Several of the songs were written as a result of lead guitarist and songwriter Gary Kemp's new relationship. The band, however, was not happy with the material, and lead singer Tony Hadley had so little confidence in the songs and the direction of the band in general that it affected his mental health. That and the involvement of Kemp and his brother, bassist Martin Kemp, in the making of a feature film created tension during the recording sessions. Preparation for filming interrupted the recording of the album and postponement of principal photography delayed the album's release. Gary Kemp alienated some of the band members even further by deciding to receive a separate production credit for the album and discontinuing regular payments of a share of publishing royalties to them, which caused them to file a lawsuit against him.

Heart Like a Sky was much less successful in the UK than their other albums, peaking at number 31 during its three weeks on the chart there. A music magazine review only gave a weak recommendation. The singles also fared poorly, the first two narrowly missing the top 40 on the UK Singles Chart and two more barely making its top 100. Although the first of these releases, "Raw", received very good responses from critics, the rest elicited mostly or completely negative reviews. The album was the group's last release before disbanding and is their last to be composed entirely of new material.

== Background ==
In October 1987 Spandau Ballet lead guitarist and songwriter Gary Kemp serendipitously reconnected with actress Sadie Frost, who had appeared in the band's videos for "Gold" and "Fight for Ourselves". He began a romance with her that replaced his tendency to be cautious with a devil-may-care attitude. The newfound freedom he felt as a result of the relationship recharged his desire to write again, which lead to several songs for their next album, Heart Like a Sky, but the rest of the band were not impressed with the demo cassette he presented. Drummer John Keeble was especially bothered since Kemp was planning to use programmed drums to record the album. (Note: "John was hurt the most. Understandably. The programmed drums had removed his input. And yet, in my strange, faithless behaviour, I even tried to persuade him that we should use the programmed drums instead.") Saxophonist Steve Norman gave Kemp a demo for a song he had written called "Motivator", which Kemp agreed that the band should record for the album.

The band disagreed upon where to record it. Kemp wanted to stay in London to be near Frost and also because he and his brother, band bassist Martin Kemp, had accepted the roles of twin gangsters Ronnie and Reggie Kray in what became the 1990 film The Krays and needed to be there since the rehearsal for the film would coincide with the recording of the album, meaning they would need to take time off from the band. (Note: "But because of Sadie, and my need to be around for the movie’s preparation, I’d pitched to stay in London to record… Martin and I were back with Anna Scher and Charles Verrall to do workshops for The Krays, which occasionally meant having to be absent from the recording studio during the making of the album.") The band's manager, Steve Dagger, wanted them to record the album in Los Angeles, thinking that it would help their relationship with the US branch of their record label, which had not shown much interest in their work. (Note: "He wanted us to get away from London, to record in LA and hopefully connect with CBS America. He was haunted by the lack of interest shown by them towards the Barricades album, which was ironic, given America was the reason we'd joined them in the first place.") Lead singer Tony Hadley felt that recording their albums away from England had elicited great results and wanted to travel again for this one, but he was outvoted by his bandmates. (Note: "Even before we got into the studio there were disagreements. The first was about where to record. It made sense to me to go away together, which is how we had worked on True, Parade and Through The Barricades. Too much time had elapsed between albums. We had started to drift apart. The camaraderie had gone. With the band at odds, it was unlikely we would produce good work. We had managed to pull things round before. In the wake of Diamond we had gone to Compass Point and come up with ‘True’. We could do it again. Martin and Gary wanted to stay in London. Steve wasn’t sure. I was dead against staying at home. There were too many distractions. We all had places of our own now and were busy decorating and buying furniture. I had a family. I had visions of us drifting in and out of the studio, less committed than we should be. I argued that we had consistently produced our best work by getting away from London. Gary and Martin stood firm. The band was split. The decision lay with Steve Norman, He opted to stay at home.") In his 2004 autobiography To Cut a Long Story Short, he wrote, "I'm convinced that, had we gone away together to make that album, we'd still be on speaking terms now."

== Recording ==
Heart Like a Sky took its toll on all of us. It was the beginning of the end, as far as I was concerned.

— Tony Hadley

Hadley described his emotional state while making the album as a "breakdown" because of the anxiety, sleeplessness, sweaty palms and tightness in the chest he experienced before each recording session. As to the reason for the breakdown, he explained, "The album was weak. I had no faith in the songs, my confidence had gone, and I had no idea where we were going as a band." He was also reluctant about the fact that they were recording at several studios (Note: "As with Diamond, we traipsed from one studio to another; in all, we recorded at Westside, Townhouse, Air, Olympic and Mayfair. We were all over the place. There was no cohesion.") and that there was new recording technology being used. (Note: "Suddenly, we had the advent of new technology. It seemed that recording was no longer so much about playing as programming. I don't think any of us had a problem with technological innovation. It's just that, at the time, it was new and no one really knew what they were doing.") He believed that Gary Kemp thought he could produce the album by himself. (Note: "Programming, in itself, wasn't going to produce a better album. I don't actually believe it was about using new techniques anyway. I think Gary [Kemp] thought he could do it more or less by himself. Not that he ever said as much.") He wrote,

As a result there was a sense of detachment about Heart Like A Sky. It was Gary Kemp in tandem with the producer, Gary Langan, saying, This is how it’s going to be. The rest of us weren’t all that involved and it showed. It was like working in a vacuum and it sucked the life out of the band, sucked the life out of the songs. The whole process became difficult and unsatisfactory. Ultimately, the record had no soul.

Hadley felt pressure from Kemp about the quality of his vocals while recording "Empty Spaces", a song Kemp wrote about the end of the relationship with his previous girlfriend, so much so that Kemp eventually wanted to split the vocals with him. Hadley told him, "I'm the lead singer of this fucking band. Now fuck off." Hadley later infuriated Kemp when he criticized his lyrics for "Windy Town" but was able to calm him down. Hadley recorded the new lines for it that Kemp gave him but was still unhappy with how they sounded.

In the end, we spent £600,000 - an obscene amount of money - making a dire album.

— Tony Hadley

The disruption of the recording of the album caused by the rehearsal for The Krays led Gary Kemp to believe that the three band members not involved in the film saw the Kemps as being "unfaithful". He felt this was an unfair assessment considering his dedication to the band from its very beginnings. (Note: "For the rest of the band, the movie must have felt as though we were being unfaithful towards them. For my part, I felt they were being unfair, given all the commitment to the band I'd shown over the years.") In his 2009 autobiography I Know This Much: From Soho to Spandau, he wrote that his anger over the situation made him realize, "Self-preservation was suddenly everything." Because of the amount of work he had put into the demos for the new album, he decided he wanted a production credit that was separate from the band. (Note: "I called Dagger and told him that I wanted to be individually credited for production on the new album as I'd done so much work on the demos. I'd always spent a great deal of time in the studio and the band had had joint production credits with Swain and Jolley as well as with Gary Langan, but this time I wanted some personal recognition.") Hadley and Keeble were upset when they heard and objected, but Dagger insisted they cooperate and finish the album. (Note: "Dagger explained that Gary Kemp wanted a separate production credit on Heart Like A Sky. There was an almighty row. It was out of order… I objected to a separate production credit for Gary Kemp. John Keeble objected. Dagger wanted us to go along with it for an easy life. He rode roughshod over our views and made it clear he was right behind Gary. He told us to get on and finish the record.")

== Release and promotion ==
The band also disagreed on the name for the album. Because they were recording in London, Keeble thought Home would be appropriate, (Note: "We argued about what to call the album. John Keeble suggested Home, since we were recording in London.") and that became its working title. Sixth Sense was also considered. Kemp suggested the title Heart Like a Sky, which was a lyric from one of the songs on the album, "Crashed Into Love". Hadley and Keeble wanted to stick with Home but were outvoted. Kemp's explanation of its meaning was that it was "about the heart being infinite in its love and grandness, just like the sky," which Hadley, years later, described as "stupid." (Note: "Gary had a better idea: Heart Like a Sky. It was more . . . esoteric. We were, after all, Spandau Ballet. An album title the entire world would understand was too obvious. Thinking back, that was probably the problem. Why be obvious when you can be clever.? Or stupid? to quote Spinal Tap. Predictably, we went down the esoteric road. A few months later, I listened, fascinated, as Gary explained the thinking behind Heart Like a Sky to a music journalist from Germany, babbling on - very intellectually, I might add - about the heart being infinite in its love and grandness, just like the sky. I hope that clears up any confusion.")

The first single from the album, "Raw", was released in the UK on 22 August 1988. During a photo shoot for its cover, Kemp criticized Hadley's choice of clothing and thought the other band members would agree. Instead Norman responded sharply in Hadley's defence. (Note: "Shooting the single's cover in a deserted market, I'd made a comment on what Tony was wearing, suggesting that it wasn't right for the picture. Instead of the support I expected from the others, I got Steve flying at me.") (Note: "We got together for a photo shoot before the first single off the album – 'Raw' - was released. Things between us were on a knife-edge by then. I was feeling low anyway. That whole period was about the unhappiest I remember. Gary made some derogatory comment, probably about whatever I was wearing, and I didn't have the energy to fight back ... At the shoot that day, Steve Norman took Gary on and had a right old go. He could see I really wasn't very well.") Hadley wrote, "You just have to look at the shots from that session to see the hostility written all over our faces."

Dagger did not want to release the album until the Kemps's work on The Krays was finished. Financial issues delayed the start of filming, however, and the release of Heart Like a Sky was pushed back (Note: "While Martin and I were being the Krays the rest of the band were waiting for us to become two-fifths of Spandau Ballet again. As far as they were concerned the film had disrupted preparations for the forthcoming tour and was probably costing them money. It had also put the album release back several times. Dagger hadn't wanted the record to come out until after we'd finished shooting the movie, but owing to the film's financing problems, that date kept shifting.") to September 1989, which was when filming started. A promotional appearance on European television required stand-ins to perform for the busy band members. (Note: "In the end it was released just as Martin and I were donning fifties suits for the camera. We were therefore unavailable for initial publicity, and a TV appearance somewhere in Europe had Spandau miming with two unknowns impersonating Martin and me on bass and guitar.")

When the Kemps finished filming and rejoined the band to begin rehearsals for the album's tour, the camaraderie between them and the other members was gone. (Note: "I understood how awful this must have been for the other three, but it still hurt when Martin and I walked back into rehearsals only two days after finishing the movie, and no one expressed any interest in what we'd done over the past eight weeks.") Hadley wrote, "Since the early days, John had always been close to Gary, but that was no longer the case," which Hadley blamed on Kemp's choice to programme the drums. (Note: "John was as thrown as I was by what was happening. His passion was playing. He was used to going into the studio and making a noise. He loved the blood, sweat and tears of it all. For him, music was, and is, a visceral experience. On Heart Like a Sky, playing was secondary. It was a case of, 'Let's just go through another eighty-two snare drum sounds and see if we can find a good one . . .' It drove him mad.") Kemp was hurt by the loss of the friendship. (Note: "For me, the saddest loss of all was my friendship with John. We'd been room-buddies, housemates, and confidants.") As they toured, the Kemps stayed at the front of the bus while Hadley, Keeble and Norman stayed in the TV room at the back. (Note: "Now, as the tour rolled itself out, we found ourselves permanently at different ends of the bus. I’d sit at the front with Martin, and find my escape in books, while John, Tony and Steve claimed the TV room at the back.") The stress of trying to keep the band together was so high for Dagger that he required hospitalisation. (Note: "We were all hiding, protecting ourselves in case of an explosion. For Dagger, it manifested itself physically. While he tried desperately to hold everything together, his body decided that it had had enough. One day it suddenly crashed and he found himself trapped hopelessly in a hospital bed, with a system that desperately needed some peace and quiet.")

== Commercial performance ==
Heart Like a Sky entered the UK Albums Chart on 24 September 1989 to begin a chart run of three weeks, the first of which was spent in its peak position at number 31. It was their lowest charting album of new material and the only one not to receive gold certification from the British Phonographic Industry. It also reached number five in Italy, number 27 in the Netherlands, number 29 in Germany, number 35 in Spain, number 47 in Sweden, and number 96 in Australia.

== Critical response ==
Professional ratings
Review scores
Source	Rating
AllMusic	2/5 stars
Record Mirror	3/5 stars

Record Mirror's Robin Smith wrote, "This album is chocolate box Spandau. The work of once angry young men who've grown up into sleek executives." He liked "Be Free with Your Love" and "Raw" but not "Empty Spaces" or "Windy Town". He concluded, "Heart Like a Sky is safe, solid and accessible. It smooths your collar, but it doesn't bite at your ankles."

== Singles ==
"Raw" debuted on the UK Singles Chart dated 3 September 1988 and peaked at number 47 during its 3 weeks there, making it their lowest charting single to date. It also reached number 11 in Italy, number 22 in Belgium, number 23 in the Netherlands and number 79 in Australia. The 1987 film Angel Heart inspired the song itself as well as its music video. The single received mostly positive reviews, with one critic writing that it was "probably their best offering yet" and another describing it as "the stuff of which great comebacks are made."

"Be Free with Your Love" was released as the second single almost a year later, on 14 August 1989. It only performed slightly better than "Raw" in the UK, peaking at number 42. It also reached number 11 in Italy, number 37 in Belgium, number 44 in the Netherlands, number 52 in West Germany and number 110 in Australia. Its music video was filmed in Los Angeles. The single received mostly negative reviews upon its release.

"Empty Spaces" was released as the third single in November 1989. It debuted in its peak position at number 94 in the UK and only spent a total of two weeks on the chart. Number One's guest critic Taylor Dayne gave the single two-and-a-half stars out of five.

The fourth and final single from the album, "Crashed Into Love", debuted on the UK Singles Chart on 24 February 1990 in its peak position at number 96. It also reached number 28 in Italy. Its music video was also filmed in Los Angeles. The review of the single in Record Mirror was not favorable.

== Aftermath ==
=== Band dissolution ===
The band signed with CBS Records in 1986 to record six albums, but Hadley wrote in 2004 that he thought it was unlikely that they would make four more albums together after the recording of Heart Like a Sky began. (Note: "When we had started making Heart Like a Sky, no one knew that it would be the last album, although, once the process was under way, the writing was on the wall. We may have signed a six-album deal with CBS but the prospect of us making the outstanding four albums was remote.") However, he also wrote, "Despite what had gone on during the making of the last album, and subsequent tour, no one had spoken about splitting up. Not to each other, anyway." Regarding his request for separate production credit on the album, Kemp wrote in 2009 that he had no concerns about how the others would feel about it because he knew at the time that it would be the last Spandau Ballet album. (Note: "I knew this would be our final album and I didn't care what the others thought.")

When the Heart Like a Sky tour ended, Dagger suggested that they do something in the studio to prompt the record company to make an advanced payment on what would have been the next album. Kemp was not interested in writing anything, so they decided to record a cover (Note: "The last time we'd been in a studio together had been just after coming off of the Heart Like a Sky tour, and was a gruelling experience that we'd all chosen to forget. I'd been in no mood to write another Spandau album and Dagger knew it … Dagger was rightly worried that we'd not do another album together ever again, and, hoping for the best but planning for the worst, he called to tell me that if we went into the studio we'd trigger a payment from CBS for the advance on the next album. I suggested we find a song to cover rather than face each other in a musical confrontation of personal interests.") but disagreed on the song. Hadley suggested the Righteous Brothers hit "You've Lost That Lovin' Feelin'", and Kemp wanted to do the Simon and Garfunkel song "The Boxer". Hadley and Keeble were again outvoted. (Note: "Predictably, there was a difference of opinion about what we should actually do. Gary Kemp wanted to cover the Simon and Garfunkel track 'The Boxer'. I thought the Righteous Brothers song, 'You've Lost That Lovin' Feelin'' was a better bet. It was an enduring pop song. I knew we could do a good, contemporary version. John Keeble liked both tracks, but agreed we had more chance of a hit with 'You've Lost That Lovin' Feelin''. After the poor performances of the recent singles, we needed a Top 5 hit. Martin backed Gary. We all looked at Steve. He wasn't sure. In the end, he came down on the side of 'The Boxer'.") Michael Kamen, who wrote the score for The Krays, produced "The Boxer", but Kemp speculated that the project was "uncomfortable" for Kamen since certain members of the band were not wanting to be there or were, at least in Kemp's view, not talking to everyone. (Note: "'The Boxer' was decided upon and I'd suggested that the composer and arranger Michael Kamen produce it. I'd met Michael when he'd written the score for The Krays. He was a gentle bear of a man, but recording 'The Boxer' was an uncomfortable experience for him. The band weren't all on talking terms and, for him, there must have been no sense of recording a band — Martin already hankered for a future in acting and was certainly not dreaming of hit records and world tours, while I just wanted to go home as soon as possible each night.") Hadley liked Kamen but thought the song was a bad choice for them and "hated" their recording. (Note: "We worked on the track with a new producer, Michael Kamen. He was a good producer, but I couldn't come to terms with the track. It seemed an unlikely song for Spandau Ballet to cover. In the end, I hated our version. It felt as if we were trying to be something we weren't. Although I was never a big fan of the song, I could see it suited Simon and Garfunkel. It didn't suit us.") Kemp wrote,

The final product was, not surprisingly, bland, with nothing about it that might suddenly reverse Spandau's limp exit from grace. We collected the CBS cheque but kept "The Boxer" on the shelf, never to be released. (Note: "The Boxer" was later released on the 2020 compilation 40 Years: The Greatest Hits.) It was the first time we'd ever done anything cynically, but by now there was little pride left. At the end of the recording there was no group meeting, no plans, no farewell, just a deceitful see-you-later, as I slipped out of the studio, and out of the band.

Kemp further described the fate of Spandau Ballet after recording the song as "an unspoken acceptance that the band would not be working, at least for the foreseeable future." Hadley, however, wrote of feeling completely unaware of any sort of dissolution at that point:

Despite the problems during the making of Heart Like a Sky, we were still speaking to each other by the end of the process -- just about. We had agreed to disagree, but our relationships weren't beyond repair. I didn't feel at that stage that there was no going back. For years afterwards, there was confusion. Had we split or were we just having time off? No one really knew. Our lives had been run by an office for years. All of a sudden, it all went quiet. The band didn't blow apart; it deflated. There was never any real closure.

=== Publishing royalties lawsuit ===
When the band first had success in the early 1980s, they created a company called Marbelow to manage their finances. At the time, Kemp decided to invest his songwriting income in the company as a way of keeping the band afloat. As he speculated that Heart Like a Sky would be their last album, he decided to stop sharing these publishing royalties with the rest of the band. He told Dagger and Martin and wanted Dagger to tell the other three instead of having a confrontation about it. (Note: "Around this time, I made another decision. Since the early eighties I'd had my own publishing company. It collected the money I earned as the songwriter for Spandau Ballet. Brian Carr had recommended the autonomy and Dagger successfully ran it from his office. I wanted my company to contribute towards the running costs of the band. To me, it seemed a fair thing to do, and so I did it on a year-by-year basis. Now, with the end looming, I chose to stop that contribution. I told Dagger and Martin. Dagger told the others. There was no confrontation about it, but it was a decision that would have a very slow-burning fuse indeed, and more destructive firepower than anything I could possibly imagine.")

Hadley's autobiography has two incidents in which he is informed of Kemp's decision. The first is during a trip to Los Angeles to film videos for "Be Free with Your Love" and "Crashed Into Love". Martin Kemp mentioned to Hadley and Keeble while having drinks that his brother was going to stop paying the 50 percent of the publishing royalties to the band. (Note: "Late one night, Martin, John and I sat in the jacuzzi at the hotel drinking, bemoaning the state of the band … Martin let slip that Gary was about to stop paying 50 per cent of the publishing royalties into Marbelow, the band's company, which was the existing arrangement.") Hadley wrote that he thought Martin was only referring to the royalties from Heart Like a Sky, which he did not think would amount to much. (Note: "Having shut us out during the making of Heart Like a Sky, it came as no surprise that Gary planned to keep the publishing royalties on the album to himself. I told Martin I didn't care. Heart Like a Sky was different to the other albums. He could stick the royalties up his arse. What I didn't appreciate at the time was that Gary was planning to keep all the publishing royalties on every song that we'd ever recorded.") The second notification came in 1993 when Hadley realized he was receiving only very small amounts of money from Marbelow. After investigating he understood that Kemp had discontinued the payment of all publishing royalties. (Note: "By 1993, I couldn’t understand why there was so little money coming through from Marbelow, the company we had set up to handle our financial affairs. I rang the office. That’s when I believe I found out I was no longer receiving an income from publishing royalties.")

Hadley, Keeble and Norman spoke with a series of attorneys before deciding to take legal action; Martin Kemp was not interested in suing his brother. The case went to trial in 1999, and a judge found in favour of Kemp, ruling that the publishing royalties were "a gift".

The band reunited in 2009, and in a 2015 interview, Hadley said,

Looking back, we should never have made the final album – I can't even bear to listen to it. Gary's said that we should have taken a couple of years off, gone away and done solo stuff and then got back together again, and he's right.

== Track listing ==
All tracks are written by Gary Kemp, except "Motivator" by Steve Norman.

No.	Title	Length
1.	"Be Free with Your Love"	4:39
2.	"Crashed Into Love"	4:43
3.	"Big Feeling"	3:47
4.	"A Matter of Time"	5:15
5.	"Motivator"	4:00
6.	"Raw"	3:46
7.	"Empty Spaces"	3:57
8.	"Windy Town"	4:22
9.	"A Handful of Dust"	4:54

== Personnel ==
=== Spandau Ballet ===
- Tony Hadley – lead and backing vocals, arrangements (1–4, 6–9)
- Gary Kemp – guitars, backing vocals, arrangements (1–4, 6–9)
- Steve Norman – guitars, saxophones, arrangements
- Martin Kemp – bass, arrangements (1–4, 6–9)
- John Keeble – drums, drum programming, arrangements (1–4, 6–9)

=== Additional musicians ===
- Toby Chapman – keyboards, programming, backing vocals, arrangements (1–4, 6–9)
- Luís Jardim – percussion (1, 5, 7, 9)
- Deuce Barter – arrangements (5)

=== The Phantom Horns ===
- Gary Barnacle – saxophones
- Peter Thoms – trombone
- John Thirkell – trumpet, flugelhorn
- Luke Tunney – trumpet

=== Technical ===
- Gary Kemp – production (1–4, 6–9)
- Gary Langan – production (1–4, 6–9)
- Spandau Ballet – production
- John Brough – engineering
- Matt Howe – engineering assistance
- Noel Rafferty – engineering assistance
- Richard Sullivan – engineering assistance
- Jeremy Wheatley – engineering assistance
- Tom Lord-Alge – mixing
- Peter Dyer – design
- Nick Bell – design assistance
- David Band – painting
- David Scheinmann – photography
- Mixed at The Hit Factory (New York City) and Larrabee Sound Studios (North Hollywood, California)

== Charts ==
Chart performance for Heart Like a Sky
Chart (1989)	Peak position
Australian Albums (ARIA)	96
Dutch Albums (Album Top 100)	27
European Albums (Music & Media)	32
German Albums (Offizielle Top 100)	29
Italian Albums (Musica e dischi)	5
Spain (AFYVE)	35
Swedish Albums (Sverigetopplistan)	47
UK Albums (Official Charts)	31

== Certifications ==
Certifications for Heart Like a Sky
Region	Certification	Certified units/sales
Spain (Promusicae)	Gold	50,000^{^}
^{^} Shipments figures based on certification alone.

== Bibliography ==
- Hadley, Tony (2004). To Cut a Long Story Short. London: Sidgwick & Jackson. ISBN 978-0-283-07386-1.
- Kemp, Gary (2009). I Know This Much: From Soho to Spandau. London: Fourth Estate. ISBN 978-0-00-732330-2.
