= Philip Jap =

English singer-songwriter

- Origin: London, England
- Genres: Synth-pop; new wave
- Occupations: Singer; songwriter; television music composer
- Instrument: Vocals
- Labels: A&M

Philip Jap is an English singer and songwriter, active in the early 1980s. He released five singles between 1980 and 1983, and one album on the A&M label. Two of his singles made the UK chart in 1982.

== Early life ==
Philip Jap was born in Camden, North London.

== Career ==
Jap was a contestant in a TV singing contest hosted by David Essex, titled The David Essex Showcase, and competed alongside acts such as Talk Talk, Thomas Dolby, Amazulu, Toto Coelo, the Belle Stars and Mari Wilson.

He released his first single, "Judy in the School for Jiving", in 1980 under the name Philip Gayle, on the PYE label, Blueprint. He scored two UK Singles Chart hits in 1982 with "Save Us" at No. 53 (produced by Trevor Horn), and "Total Erasure" (produced by Tony Mansfield), which peaked at No. 41. Both these songs appeared on his 1983 self-titled debut album, which was produced by Trevor Horn, Colin Thurston and Tony Mansfield.

Jap went on to set up a successful music production company in Primrose Hill.

== Discography ==
=== Albums ===
- 1983: Philip Jap

=== Singles ===
- 1980: "Judy in the School for Jiving" (as Philip Gayle)
- 1982: "Save Us" – UK No. 53
- 1982: "Total Erasure" – UK No. 41
- 1983: "Red Dogs"
- 1983: "Brain Dance"
