= How Many Lies? =

Single by Spandau Ballet

from the album Through the Barricades
- B-side: "Communication" (live)
- Released: 2 February 1987
- Recorded: 1986
- Length: 4:34 (single version); 5:21 (album version); 5:24 (instrumental version)
- Label: CBS
- Songwriter: Gary Kemp
- Producers: Gary Langan; Spandau Ballet

Spandau Ballet singles chronology
| "Through the Barricades" (1986) | "How Many Lies?" (1987) | "Raw" (1988) |

"How Many Lies?" is a song by the English new wave band Spandau Ballet, released as the third single from their 1986 album Through the Barricades. It charted in several countries but received mixed reviews. It was the band's last UK top 40 single.

== Release and commercial performance ==
"How Many Lies?" was released in the UK on 2 February 1987 and peaked at number 34 on the UK Singles Chart. It also reached number 5 in Italy, number 17 in Ireland, number 23 in the Netherlands, number 25 in Belgium, number 32 in Spain, number 66 on the European Hot 100 and number 86 in Canada.

== Critical reception ==
Critics were divided in their opinions upon its release. The reviews of the song for US retailers and radio stations in Billboard and Cash Box magazines noted that it was the first single released there from the Through the Barricades album. The editors of Billboard also wrote that the "rueful rock ballad's thrumming choral production recalls the artier days of 10cc." The editors of Cash Box opined, "With distinctive style and sophistication, the group's Epic debut should challenge CHR playlists." Number One's Max Bell wrote, "Worth buying for the lyrics alone", described Kemp's songwriting as a "masterpiece" and Steve Norman's saxophone playing as "majestic", and averred that Hadley's singing "would leave Luciano Pavarotti breathless with admiration". Jane Wilkes of Record Mirror placed her review of the song in the category she labelled "The Pits". Smash Hits guest critic Wayne Hussey wrote, "This is a predictably manicured and mild-mannered song with god-awful sentiments."

== Track listings ==
- 7-inch single

A. "How Many Lies" – 4:33
B. "Communication" (live) – 3:41

- 7-inch single (US only)

A. "How Many Lies" – 4:33
B. "Snakes and Lovers" – 4:30

- 12-inch single

A. "How Many Lies" – 5:23
B1. "Communication" (live) – 3:41
B2. "How Many Lies" (instrumental) – 5:23

== Charts ==
Weekly chart performance for "How Many Lies?"
| Chart (1987) | Peak position |
|---|---|
| Belgium (Ultratop 50 Flanders) | 25 |
| Canada Top Singles (RPM) | 86 |
| Europe (European Hot 100 Singles) | 66 |
| Ireland (IRMA) | 17 |
| Italy (Musica e dischi) | 5 |
| Luxembourg (Radio Luxembourg) | 19 |
| Netherlands (Dutch Top 40) | 25 |
| Netherlands (Single Top 100) | 23 |
| Spain (AFYVE) | 32 |
| UK Singles (Official Charts) | 34 |
