= Through the Barricades (song) =

Single by Spandau Ballet

from the album Through the Barricades
- B-side: "With the Pride" (Live in '85)
- Released: 27 October 1986
- Recorded: 1986
- Genre: Soft rock
- Length: 5:20 (single/video version); 5:58 (album version); 7:09 (extended version)
- Label: CBS
- Songwriter: Gary Kemp
- Producers: Gary Langan; Spandau Ballet

Spandau Ballet singles chronology
"Fight for Ourselves" (1986)	"Through the Barricades" (1986)	"How Many Lies" (1987)

"Through the Barricades" is a song by the English new wave band Spandau Ballet, released as the second single from their 1986 studio album of the same name. The song was inspired by the murder of a member of the band's road crew in Belfast during the Troubles and emerged as the Spandau Ballet song that the band members rated the best. It reached number six on the UK Singles Chart, becoming their final top ten hit, and made the top ten elsewhere.

== Background ==
When Spandau Ballet guitarist and songwriter Gary Kemp met Clare Grogan in 1981, her band Altered Images employed Belfast native Thomas "Kidso" Reilly as a member of their road crew. Spandau Ballet hired him to sell merchandise during their 1983 UK tour and enjoyed his upbeat personality. (Note: "Kidso was a Belfast boy whose Falls Road accent revealed his allegiances. I'd met this ardent Celtic fan — christened Thomas Reilly — during my courtly friendship with Clare Grogan. Small, dark and fit for the street, he'd worked with Altered Images as part of their road crew, but later, in 1983, he joined us on our UK tour, helping, rather successfully, to sell merchandise. We soon became very fond of him. He was a good guy whose optimistic temperament encouraged others to fold their proverbial wings around him.") He became a casualty of the Troubles, however, on 9 August 1983 when he was walking with a group in which someone ridiculed a British army patrol. Kemp described the incident in his 2009 autobiography I Know This Much: From Soho to Spandau:

One hot, sunny evening, Kidso was walking home bare chested through the streets of West Belfast, when he and a few friends were stopped by an army patrol. After giving his name and details he walked away. In one hand was his takeout, in the other his T-shirt. A few seconds later he was dead, shot in the back by a young private who would later become the first British soldier convicted of murder while serving in Northern Ireland. Kidso was twenty-three.

The band's first exposure to the political climate in Belfast on that year's tour was especially eye-opening, (Note: "For a band used to touring Western cities, Belfast came as a shock. The observation towers that loomed like giant beasts of war flagged up the city's difference as soon as you arrived. And then there were the army trucks, cruising nervously through the old streets, the tanks, the RUC's bullet-proof vans, and the general visibility of weaponry, all of which told of a city under occupation, a city that in 1983 I found impossible to imagine as part of the cosy, tea-and-toast Britain I thought I knew.") but it was their stop there on the Parade tour in 1984 that inspired Kemp to use the setting as a backdrop for a song. He met with Kidso's brother, Jim Reilly, who took him to Milltown Cemetery to see Kidso's grave. During their trip down the Falls Road along the way, Kemp was taken aback by the sight of the barricades that were used as peace lines. (Note: "The following year we were back in Belfast for the Parade tour and I'm introduced to Jim Reilly. He's a drummer — he'd played in the punk band Stiff Little Fingers — but he's also Kidso's brother and he came along to meet us at the King's Hall. Somehow he and I decided that he'd walk me down the Falls Road the next day, for a little insight into how he and his family lived. What affected me most as we walked were the so-called 'peace lines' that blocked the streets branching off that Catholic thoroughfare. On the other side I saw people walking, dressed in a similar style, fellow citizens, no different from the people I found myself with on this side, but, cordoned off by the barricades, they could have been on another continent.")

== Composition and lyrical interpretation ==
The band later spent time in Dublin, (Note: "The best time we had was together in Dublin.") and Kemp began writing the songs for their next album there over the course of six months in 1985. (Note: "Spandau's 17th single, a song about love across the Protestant and Catholic divides of Northern Ireland written, like the album, in Dublin during six months of last year, is as far removed from the pleasure-loving, soul boy days of 'Chant No. 1' as possible.") After spending an evening reading about the history of the Troubles, he was again consumed by the political climate in Belfast and his memory of the visit to Kidso's grave. (Note: "A few months later, living in Dublin, I'm doing my history, and Ulick O'Connor's the Troubles lodges upon my bedside table. One night, while reading, I find myself thinking of that day, of Kidso, of the barricades and the divided people. What do I know? I'm a privileged pop star. But what I did know, as I closed the book, was how affected I was by it all.") He woke after little sleep and felt compelled to get up and write down the lyrics that came to mind. (Note: "About two in the morning I wake, and lying beneath the covers find lines forming in my head... In all my time of writing songs I'd never leapt, cliché-like, from the bed in search of a pen, but now I am.") In a Mastertapes interview in 2013 he told John Wilson, "[T]he first thing that probably came along was, 'I know what they're saying. It's a terrible beauty we've made'", the last half of which is a quote from the W. B. Yeats poem "Easter, 1916", about the Irish Easter Rising. He also told Wilson it was a song he had written "completely lyric first". The music came to him immediately as well. (Note: "It came in one sitting; a surprise delivery of lyrics and music.") When explaining to Wilson the arena rock sound he wanted for the album, Wilson asked if some of the intimacy of love songs gets lost. Kemp replied, "I think I tried as a writer to do both in 'Through the Barricades'. So that's the best of both worlds. It starts with a dry guitar, and it's very, very intimate and ends up singing to the galleries." In his autobiography he wrote,

Sure, hiding in there somewhere was Bowie with "Five Years" or "Life on Mars", but it owed more to my early prog rock records — a touch of Jethro Tull's Thick as a Brick maybe — as well as adolescent trips to folk clubs.

It's a song that represents anyone that's had struggles.

— Martin Kemp

Kemp felt writing it as a love song set against the divided city would be the best way to dramatize what he had seen, (Note: "It's a love song — that's what I know best; no: that's how best to tell it - a Romeo and Juliet tale set somewhere divided, somewhere torn, somewhere made for a tragic assignation. Belfast.") and in 2015, he told the Belfast Telegraph, "I didn't expect it to come out in the shape of a Romeo and Juliet sort of song, but it did." He explained at the time of the song's release that the "different sides of life" mentioned in the lyrics paralleled relationships between people of different races and religions found throughout the world. (Note: "It's like a Romeo and Juliet situation. It's a love story where the individuals come from either different races or different religions and just the problems that would occur in that situation. Um, it's quite sad in a way because that thing is happening all over the world, not just in places like Northern Ireland or South Africa, say, but in London with a black and white relationship.") When asked if that choice was an indication of Spandau Ballet becoming more socially aware, he replied, "No, it's just, I think you can write love songs. That's very easy, but you've got to put that in a situation that's a bit more unusual to make it poignant." Kemp's brother, Martin, the band's bassist, told the Belfast Telegraph in 2020, "It was written about Catholics and Protestants in Northern Ireland and finding love across that divide but it is also about finding love across any sort of divide that keeps people apart." In an article titled "It's a Terrible Beauty We've Made: Singing 'Through the Barricades' with Spandau Ballet", Dr. Jason Eng Hun Lee of Hong Kong Baptist University wrote that the song can "teach us to reconcile with our adversaries and inner demons so that we might one day transcend these differences between us." Discussing the song in the context of the band having reunited after a lawsuit over royalties kept them apart for many years, Gary Kemp said, "It's also a story about us… 'Through the Barricades' is what we had to do in the end."

== Recording ==
Because of the powerful subject matter, Kemp felt more connected to the song than he had others he had written (Note: "It was climactic and dramatic, and all in all I began to have a relationship with it like no other song I'd ever written. When you sang it, you felt its power.") and felt possessive of it, so much so that he spent extra time performing the song for lead singer Tony Hadley to make sure he understood his concerns. (Note: "As the band began to find their way through it, I made reasoned excuses to Tony as to why I should sing it just one more time — 'Have a listen to how the middle section goes' — 'Just read the lyrics for now until you get the vibe'— 'Let me show you again'. I had to let the song go, but with 'Barricades' a dangerous desire to own it started to form within me.") Hadley had a good working relationship with True and Parade producer Steve Jolley, (Note: "Tony'd lost the mentor he had in Steve Jolley.") but the band wanted to move on to someone more suited to the sound of live performance that they wanted to have on their new studio album. (Note: "We wanted to move on from Swain and Jolley, we wanted a bigger, meatier sound, one more suitable to the arenas we were now playing.") They chose Gary Langan, a recording engineer they met while working with Trevor Horn, as their producer on "Fight for Ourselves", the first single from the new album, and decided to hire him to work in that same capacity on the project, (Note: "Working in Germany in the wintery new year of 1986, we got off to a great start with the song 'Fight For Ourselves' and rubber-stamped Langan through into continuing the co-production of the whole album with us.") which would eventually also be called Through the Barricades.

[I]t was a very difficult song to arrange because… the more instruments we put on the beginning, the more it detracted from Tony's singing. So in the end we just said, "Well, let's be brave enough to make it as simple as just an old-fashioned acoustic guitar and a voice."

— Gary Kemp

Kemp sensed that the change in producers might reactivate old issues that began with recording Hadley's vocals for the Diamond album (Note: "For Tony, it must have brought back all the fear he felt back under that Turkish rug.") when that producer, Richard James Burgess, tried having Hadley lie down in a sort of makeshift tent in the studio with candles lit to help him relax while he was singing. (Note: "It was while I was wrestling with 'Paint Me Down' that Richard Burgess came up with what he thought was an inspired idea. He had heard - although precisely where from remains a mystery - that singers sometimes performed better lying down. He wanted to put me in a tent with a few candles to create a relaxed mood.") Hadley also felt the other band members judging his every mistake at those sessions as they watched him record from the control room (Note: "As I sweated, the rest of the band watched from behind the glass that separated the studio from the control room. Everyone was willing me to get it right, which only made matters worse. Each time I messed up a line I sensed a collective rolling of the eyes.") to the point where he lost his temper. (Note: "I don't even remember which track I was struggling with. I just remember losing it. Again, the rest of the band was watching from the control room.") The sentiment of "Through The Barricades" added to the tension in the studio as Hadley again felt the expectations of the band as they looked on. (Note: "When we recorded it there was a lot of pressure to get it right. I remember working on the vocals in the studio at Musicland, as Gary and the others watched from the control room. It was incredibly off-putting, everyone going on about the sentiment of the song, and how important it was.") Kemp recalled putting pressure on him as he tried to record the vocals:

I'd been stopping Tony after every line. I could see him frustrated behind the glass…, but I gnawed away at any loose nuance. A few days earlier I'd played the guitar part, and then, at my suggestion, put on a guide vocal myself. It was meant to be a template for other overdubs but was more a flag of ownership stuck in the track. It only led to more pressure on Tony to deliver.

In his 2004 autobiography To Cut a Long Story Short, Hadley wrote, "Finally, I said, 'Look, I'll go away and learn the song in my own way and when I'm ready to sing it, I'll tell you. But I do not want everyone in the studio.'" He eventually recorded it with just Langan present, but Kemp claims that it was Langan who suggested this. (Note: "Langan turned the talkback button to off so Tony couldn't hear what we were saying. 'Look, Gary, why don't we start again tomorrow on this? But maybe I should do it my own with Tony.'") Afterward Kemp also admitted that Hadley gave his best performance ever.

== Release and commercial performance ==
"Through the Barricades" was released in the UK on 27 October 1986 and peaked at number six on the UK Singles Chart, remaining on the chart for ten weeks. Although the band thought it would be successful, they were disappointed that it did not chart higher there. (Note: "We were confident it would be a huge hit. When it peaked at Number 6 in November '86, we were all disappointed. It deserved to be a bigger hit.") It gave them their first number one in Italy and also reached number two in Spain, number three in the Netherlands, number four in Ireland, number six on the European Hot 100, number seven in Norway, number ten in Belgium, number 14 in West Germany and number 50 in Australia. It received Silver certification from the British Phonographic Industry on 2 April 2021 for reaching the 200,000 units of shipment threshold.

In the US, Billboard magazine's 29 November 1986 issue reported that the song would be released there as a single in early 1987, but instead the release of "How Many Lies" in the US in March came right behind that song's UK release in February. Both Billboard and Cash Box indicated that "How Many Lies" was the first single that was released in the US from the Through the Barricades album in their respective single reviews. Billboard reported on the availability of the "Through the Barricades" music video for programming in the US in its 16 May 1987 issue, and Cash Box reviewed the song in its Single Releases column the following month, in its 20 June issue.

== Critical reception ==
"Through the Barricades" received mixed reviews at the time of its release. In recommending the single to retailers and radio stations, the editors of Cash Box felt it had "enough appealing elements to be the rare ballad to become a hit with CHR programmers." Simon Mills of Smash Hits magazine considered the song's title "preposterous" and, after quoting the lyrics, described the recording as "all tinged with a vaguely Gaelic, acoustic feel. I'm sure it's all very sincere and significant. I just can't stand it." Number One's Anna Martin wrote, "Unadventurous but highly polished, this is very much a classic Spands release—a safe and surefire hit." When the Through the Barricades album was released, her colleague Karen Swayne wrote that both the title song and the album showed that Kemp "still has a way with a catchy chorus and a sure commercial instinct". In a review of the album for Record Mirror, Roger Morton opined that the songs were "ultimately neutered by the self-conscious classiness of it all," concluding that "even the title song's beautifully crafted, doubtlessly sincere lament for Northern Ireland ends up sounding bogus."

Retrospective reviews also varied. Dan LeRoy of AllMusic called it "the best song by far" on its album. In a review of a concert from the band's reunion tour in 2009, the critic for The Independent dismissed it as "unimaginably patronising". During his time with BBC Radio Ulster in 2010, Stuart Bailie described the song as "repellent". Ian Gittins was critical of the song in The Guardian in 2014, describing it as "one of Spandau's more ponderous, clunky numbers".

== Aftermath ==
Kemp received the award for Outstanding Song Collection at the 2012 Ivor Novello Awards and named "Through the Barricades" as "one I'm really close to." Other band members and Langan have been generous in their praise of the song since its release. Tony Hadley said that he considers it to be the band's best song, adding in his autobiography that "in the years that followed, nothing else came close". When asked about his first impression of the song by Dutch Public TV in 2014, drummer John Keeble said, "Astonishing. I mean, it was, you know, the best thing I'd ever heard, and it was like, 'Wow, where did that come from?'" When the Through the Barricades album was remastered in 2017, Langan recalled listening to all the demos when he agreed to produce the original album and singling it out as the "killer song", explaining, "Back then albums had to have the single, the killer song, and unless you had that it wasn't deemed that you had a successful album." Martin Kemp told the Belfast Telegraph that, for him, the song "means the most because it was about finding love across a divide, no matter what that divide is… They're the sort of stories that touch my heart the most."

Hadley performed the song as part of his three-song set in the final of ITV reality show Reborn in the USA in 2003, which saw him win the public vote against Michelle Gayle.

== Track listings ==
- 7-inch single

A. "Through the Barricades" – 5:10
B. "With the Pride" (Live in '85) – 5:30

- 7-inch single (US only)

A. "Through the Barricades" – 5:56
B. "Snakes and Lovers" – 4:30

- 12-inch single

A. "Through the Barricades" (extended version) – 7:08
B1. "With the Pride" (Live in '85) – 5:30
B2. "Through the Barricades" (album version) – 5:55

== Charts ==
=== Weekly charts ===
Weekly chart performance for "Through the Barricades"
Chart (1986–1987)	Peak position
Australia (Kent Music Report)	50
Belgium (Ultratop 50 Flanders)	10
Europe (European Hot 100 Singles)	6
Ireland (IRMA)	4
Italy (Musica e dischi)	1
Luxembourg (Radio Luxembourg)	5
Netherlands (Dutch Top 40)	3
Netherlands (Single Top 100)	4
Norway (VG-lista)	7
Spain (AFYVE)	2
UK Singles (Official Charts)	6
West Germany (GfK)	14

=== Year-end charts ===
Year-end chart performance for "Through the Barricades"
Chart (1987)	Position
Netherlands (Dutch Top 40)	77
Netherlands (Single Top 100)	100

== Certifications ==
Certifications for "Through the Barricades"
Region	Certification	Certified units/sales
Italy (FIMI)	Gold	25,000^{‡}
United Kingdom (BPI)	Silver	200,000^{‡}
^{‡} Sales+streaming figures based on certification alone.

== Bibliography ==
- Hadley, Tony (2004). To Cut a Long Story Short. London: Sidgwick & Jackson. ISBN 978-0-283-07386-1.
- Kemp, Gary (2009). I Know This Much: From Soho to Spandau. London: Fourth Estate. ISBN 978-0-00-732330-2.
