= Raw (song) =

Single by Spandau Ballet

from the album Heart Like a Sky
- B-side: "Raw (Flip)"
- Released: 22 August 1988
- Recorded: 1988
- Length: 3:46 (single/album version); 3:50 (Flip); 7:46 (Extended Mix); 5:43 (Amnesia Mix)
- Label: CBS
- Songwriter: Gary Kemp
- Producers: Gary Kemp; Gary Langan; Spandau Ballet

Spandau Ballet singles chronology
"How Many Lies" (1987)	"Raw" (1988)	"Be Free with Your Love" (1989)

"Raw" is a song by the English new wave band Spandau Ballet, released as the first single from their 1989 album Heart Like a Sky. It failed to make the top 40 in the UK but received mostly positive reviews.

== Background ==
The period when the band was preparing to release "Raw" as a single reflected a time of turmoil for the band. During the making of Spandau Ballet's 1986 album Through the Barricades, brothers and band members Gary and Martin Kemp were approached with the idea of starring in a film about twin gangsters Ronnie and Reggie Kray. Their work on the film disrupted the recording of their next album ("Raw"'s parent album), Heart Like a Sky, and created tension between the Kemps and the rest of the band. (Note: "Becoming Ronnie didn't help. I was suddenly looking in two directions outside of the group. More importantly, the process was beginning to infringe upon the band's business. Martin and I were back with Anna Scher and Charles Verrall to do workshops for The Krays, which occasionally meant having to be absent from the recording studio during the making of the album ... it was helping to split the band into two camps, and Dagger was trying to hold us all together.") During the cover photo shoot for the "Raw" single, Gary Kemp criticized lead singer Tony Hadley's choice of clothing and thought the other band members would agree. Instead their saxophonist, Steve Norman, responded sharply in Hadley's defence. (Note: "Shooting the single's cover in a deserted market, I'd made a comment on what Tony was wearing, suggesting that it wasn't right for the picture. Instead of the support I expected from the others, I got Steve flying at me.") (Note: "We got together for a photo shoot before the first single off the album – 'Raw' - was released. Things between us were on a knife-edge by then. I was feeling low anyway. That whole period was about the unhappiest I remember. Gary made some derogatory comment, probably about whatever I was wearing, and I didn't have the energy to fight back... At the shoot that day, Steve Norman took Gary on and had a right old go. He could see I really wasn't very well.") In his 2004 autobiography To Cut a Long Story Short, Hadley wrote, "You just have to look at the shots from that session to see the hostility written all over our faces."

Kemp told Record Mirror at the time of its release that "Raw" was "about paranoia" and that it was "based on" Alan Parker's 1987 film Angel Heart. Dialog from the film can be heard on the Amnesia Mix of the song. (Note: "The 12 inch Amnesia Mix is particularly dynamic, using samples from the soundtrack of the film Angel Heart.") Kemp said, "I wanted it to be voodoo, … I wanted it to be manic, and to have a kind of New Orleans feel, so at the beginning there's that wild trumpet. It's almost a ritualistic, drug-orientated feel." Angel Heart also inspired the video, which was filmed at an old power station in South London.

== Release and commercial performance ==
"Raw" was released in the UK on 22 August 1988 and peaked at number 47 on the UK Singles Chart. It also reached number 11 in Italy, number 22 in Belgium, number 23 in the Netherlands and number 79 in Australia. Kemp described the song as "[a] return to 'Chant'-style funk with a swamp-infested, malevolent beat that, in our opinion, would take Spandau Ballet straight back to the dance floor." He realized in retrospect, however, that new trends in dance music that the band was not following had taken over. (Note: "By then Rampling's Acid was burning through the UK clubs, and we weren't even warm. We should have read the signs earlier.")

== Critical reception ==
"Raw" received mostly positive reviews upon its release. Smash Hits critic Alex Kadis wrote, "Now they're back with probably their best offering yet! 'Raw' is a-brim with atmosphere and steamy bits and is really very exhilarating indeed." Record Mirror's Robin Smith wrote, "'Raw' is the stuff of which great comebacks are made. A fiery dance blend that hints nostalgically at the past but looks forward at the same time." Number One's guest critic Mark Goodier gave the song three stars out of five, remarking, "This takes too long to get to the chorus."

== Track listings ==
- 7-inch single

A. "Raw" – 3:46
B. "Raw" (Flip) – 3:50

- 12-inch single

A. "Raw"(Extended Mix) – 7:46
B. "Raw" (Flip) – 3:50

- CD single

A. "Raw" – 3:46
B. "Raw" (Flip) – 3:50
C. "Raw" (Extended Mix) – 7:46

- Picture CD single

A. "Raw" – 3:46
B. "Raw" (Flip) – 3:50
C. "Raw" (Amnesia Mix) – 5:43

== Charts ==
Weekly chart performance for "Raw"
Chart (1988)	Peak position
Australia (Kent Music Report)	79
Belgium (Ultratop 50 Flanders)	22
Italy (Musica e dischi)	11
Italy Airplay (Music & Media)	10
Netherlands (Dutch Top 40)	27
Netherlands (Single Top 100)	23
UK Singles (Official Charts)	47

== Bibliography ==
- Hadley, Tony (2004). To Cut a Long Story Short. London: Sidgwick & Jackson. ISBN 978-0-283-07386-1.
- Kemp, Gary (2009). I Know This Much: From Soho to Spandau. London: Fourth Estate. ISBN 978-0-00-732330-2.
