= Be Free with Your Love =

Single by Spandau Ballet

from the album Heart Like a Sky
- B-side: "Be Free with Your Love (Dance Mix Edit)"
- Released: 14 August 1989
- Recorded: 1988–1989
- Length: 4:39 (single/album version); 3:56 (Dance Mix Edit); 6:36 (Extended Dance Mix); 5:07 (Dub Mix)
- Label: CBS
- Songwriter: Gary Kemp
- Producers: Gary Kemp; Gary Langan; Spandau Ballet

Spandau Ballet singles chronology
| "Raw" (1988) | "Be Free with Your Love" (1989) | "Empty Spaces" (1989) |

"Be Free with Your Love" is a song by the English new wave band Spandau Ballet, released as the second single from their 1989 album Heart Like a Sky. It received mostly negative reviews and became their second consecutive single that failed to make the top 40 in the UK.

== Background ==
Many of the songs written for the album, including "Free with Your Love", reflected a newfound rejuvenation that guitarist and primary songwriter Gary Kemp was experiencing thanks to his recent reconnection with eventual wife, actress Sadie Frost.

The music video for "Be Free with Your Love" was filmed in Los Angeles.

== Release and commercial performance ==
"Be Free with Your Love" was released in the UK on 14 August 1989 and peaked at number 42 on the UK Singles Chart. It also reached number 11 in Italy, number 37 in Belgium, number 44 in the Netherlands, number 52 in West Germany and number 110 in Australia.

== Critical reception ==
"Be Free with Your Love" received mostly negative reviews upon its release. Record Mirror's guest critic Stephen Duffy felt that he'd heard everything the song had to offer in its first minute. (Note: "Sounding like a decaffeinated Manassas (old hippy group) at 78rpm, the song is dispensed with in the first minute, leaving the rest of the disk to be filled with areba areba.") Smash Hits guest critic Dr. Robert of The Blow Monkeys criticized Gary Kemp's songwriting and found the instruments added during the bridge to be preferable to Tony Hadley's singing. (Note: "Oh, I'd forgotten how bad Gary Kemp's lyrics were… But I've just been reminded! Something happens halfway through this which is a bit of an improvement—it breaks out with brass and it sounds a lot better because all these girlie-girlies start singing loudly so you can't hear old Tony Hadley!!") Music & Media wrote that "Be Free with Your Love" begins "as a typical FM rock song, suddenly accelerating into a very fast pace, spiced up by energetic brass."

== Track listings ==
- 7-inch single

A. "Be Free with Your Love" – 4:39
B. "Be Free with Your Love" (Dance Mix Edit) – 3:56

- 12-inch single

A. "Be Free with Your Love"(Extended Dance Mix) – 6:36
B1. "Be Free with Your Love" (Dub Mix) – 5:07
B2. "Be Free with Your Love" – 4:39

- CD single

A. "Be Free with Your Love" – 4:39
B. "Be Free with Your Love" (Dance Mix Edit) – 3:56
C. "Raw" (Extended 12" Mix) – 7:46

- Picture CD single

A. "Be Free with Your Love" – 4:39
B. "Be Free with Your Love" (Dance Mix Edit) – 3:56
C. "Through the Barricades" – 5:55

== Charts ==
=== Weekly charts ===
Weekly chart performance for "Be Free with Your Love"
| Chart (1989) | Peak position |
|---|---|
| Australia (ARIA) | 110 |
| Belgium (Ultratop 50 Flanders) | 37 |
| Italy (Musica e dischi) | 11 |
| Italy Airplay (Music & Media) | 2 |
| Netherlands (Dutch Top 40) | 33 |
| Netherlands (Single Top 100) | 44 |
| UK Singles (Official Charts) | 42 |
| West Germany (GfK) | 52 |

== Bibliography ==
- Hadley, Tony (2004). To Cut a Long Story Short. London: Sidgwick & Jackson. ISBN 978-0-283-07386-1.
- Kemp, Gary (2009). I Know This Much: From Soho to Spandau. London: Fourth Estate. ISBN 978-0-00-732330-2.
