= Through the Barricades =

Studio album by Spandau Ballet
- Released: 17 November 1986
- Recorded: 1986
- Studios: Musicland (Munich, West Germany); Miraval (Correns, France)
- Genres: Pop rock; blue-eyed soul; new wave
- Length: 40:00
- Label: CBS
- Producers: Gary Langan; Spandau Ballet

Spandau Ballet chronology
The Twelve Inch Mixes (1986)	Through the Barricades (1986)	Heart Like a Sky (1989)

Singles from Through the Barricades
- 1. "Fight for Ourselves" Released: 14 July 1986; 2. "Through the Barricades" Released: 27 October 1986; 3. "How Many Lies" Released: 2 February 1987

Through the Barricades is the fifth studio album by the English new wave band Spandau Ballet, released on 17 November 1986 by CBS Records. The band was continuing their efforts to replicate the sound of their live performance on a studio album that they had attempted unsuccessfully with their previous album, Parade. They were also wanting to address any misconceptions about their music that came from the success of their first US hit song, "True", and reshape the style of their music to that of a rock band. The title song, which details the struggles in a relationship, was chosen as the album title because of how they felt they were being perceived. Through the Barricades was also their first album with the label after leaving Chrysalis Records because of the downturn in their popularity in the US after "True".

Through the Barricades reached number seven on the UK Albums Chart and achieved platinum certification for sales of 300,000 units there. Several reviews were critical, faulting either the production or the songwriting. The band was disappointed in the chart performance of the singles. The title song fared best, reaching number six in the UK, but was the only one of the three to make the top ten. The label neglected to release any singles in the US for several months after it had done so elsewhere, and the band found themselves in the same place of not feeling like they were getting the exposure there that they wanted. The fact that members of the band were approached during the making of the album to pursue acting was seen as the start of the band's breakup, which came after the release of their next album, Heart Like a Sky, in 1989.

== Background, development and recording ==
Spandau Ballet's 1983 single "True" became their first song to make the Billboard Hot 100 in the US, where it peaked at number four while also spending a week at number one on the magazine's Adult Contemporary chart. However, before their next single, "Gold", was released there later that year, the band's lead guitarist and songwriter Gary Kemp acknowledged that the softer style of "True" could give people a very limited understanding of their music. He hoped their upcoming US tour to support the True album would disabuse that part of their audience of the notion that the rest of their songs sounded the same. (Note: "I'm glad 'Gold' is going to do well over here; it's shaking off the enigma of (the song) 'True'. It's selling us as a band. The thing that worried us about America is people didn't know Spandau Ballet, they knew 'True' … People who only know Spandau Ballet for the soft focus image on 'True' ... well, we wanted to come over and show ourselves with all our hard edges, transport our history over to America.") The band addressed this concern again in 1985 when they toured there with the British-American supergroup The Power Station as a way of, as Billboard described it, "gaining more rock credibility".

At the time they were already taking action against their label, Chrysalis Records. In his autobiography I Know This Much: From Soho to Spandau, Kemp wrote, "America was not going to plan. 'Gold' had been a hit, although not as big as 'True' ... While we were selling large amounts in Europe and the rest of the world, Chrysalis America were not pulling their weight." Their next two US singles, "Communication" and "Only When You Leave", also did not chart as well there as they did elsewhere, (Note: "'Communication' and 'Only When You Leave' had fallen away early.") which left Kemp sure Chrysalis was to blame. (Note: "The spat between Wright and Ellis, the two company owners, was worsening and it seemed to us we were being affected like the children of a disintegrating marriage.") The band sued the label in 1985 for not supporting and promoting their work. In the settlement Chrysalis lost their rights to any new recordings by Spandau Ballet, who then signed to CBS Records in 1986.

For their CBS debut, the band "wanted a bigger, meatier sound, one more suitable to the arenas we were now playing." This desire to expand their sound began during the True tour when the band noticed that their chemistry on stage had improved. They decided back then to have their next album capture that feeling of performing live. (Note: "While we were on tour last year we really gelled together as a unit,… and we wanted to get some of that feeling into this LP. True was very different live from on record. With this LP we didn't want to have such a large gap.") They continued working with True album co-producers Tony Swain and Steve Jolley on its follow-up, Parade, but Kemp felt that album failed to achieve the new sound they were after. In an interview with Number One magazine in 1986, he reasoned, "I think we were a bit afraid of making a big jump after True. The trouble was that Parade the record wasn't like we did it live. People went home and were disappointed by the record."

We're a rock band now.

— Gary Kemp in 1986

The band spent time in Dublin, (Note: "The best time we had was together in Dublin.") and Kemp began writing the songs for their next album there over the course of six months in 1985. (Note: "Spandau's 17th single, a song about love across the Protestant and Catholic divides of Northern Ireland written, like the album, in Dublin during six months of last year, is as far removed from the pleasure-loving, soul boy days of 'Chant No. 1' as possible.") During that time, they socialized with the members of Def Leppard, who were also living there. (Note: "Dublin was full of musicians, and we spent days with Frankie Goes to Hollywood and Def Leppard, who were both living there.") Kemp credited them for influencing the arena rock sound on the album. (Note: Gary Kemp: "'Cross the Line' is the opener, and it's much more arena rock for Spandau. And I think it may have had something to do with who we were hanging out with in Dublin." Steve Norman: "Def Leppard!") He also credited Live Aid because he felt it made fans want to see live performances, explaining, "People are sick of sitting at home watching pretty people in videos. They want to get out of their homes and be part of it."

I think it's our best album because we were playing so well on it.

— Gary Kemp in 2017

Spandau Ballet decided to try co-producing with someone else once they changed labels (Note: "We wanted to move on from Swain and Jolley[.]") and chose Gary Langan, a recording engineer they met while working with Trevor Horn. (Note: "An engineer cum co-producer was what we were after and Gary Langan was our first choice. He'd been Trevor's engineer for years and had worked with us on the fateful Pleasure Project.") Kemp had high praise for Langan's work with his own band, Art of Noise, as well as ABC and Billy Idol. (Note: "Gary had worked with people like Billy Idol, the Art of Noise and we'd worked with him with Trevor Horn. He'd done that Beauty Stab album for ABC, which I though sounded great. Gary was a great, great engineer … the best engineer in the world.") Spandau Ballet decided they would test him out in the role of co-producer of one song for their Parade follow-up to see if they worked well together before committing to an entire album with him in that capacity. (Note: "We would go back to Munich and record one track to see how things went. If it worked, we'd take on the album with him.") They recorded that song, "Fight for Ourselves", in the winter of 1986 (Note: "Working in Germany in the wintery new year of 1986, we got off to a great start with the song 'Fight For Ourselves' and rubber-stamped Langan through into continuing the co-production of the whole album with us.") at Musicland Studios in Munich and decided to keep Langan on as co-producer for the entire album. In a 2017 documentary discussing the remastering of the album, which came to be called Through the Barricades, Langan told the band, "When I heard the demos, I think my first impression was that you'd grown up," and summarized the demos as "an adult step in writing and moving forward." When Kemp and Langan spoke with superdeluxeedition.com about the 2017 reissue, Langan discussed how perfect the offer to do the project was for him at the time in that both he and Kemp wanted to leave behind the style of music they had been doing. He described Kemp's vision for the album as "robust." (Note: "This was a time when Gary wanted to change direction and it was about doing the tour. There was this whole vision and it did need to be robust. And it was somewhere where I wanted to go. All that time [when I worked] with Trevor Horn was really amazing pop, but I now wanted to go and do something different.") Kemp added, "I think we were entering an era, where it was more about 'the album' than about singles, so much, for us." Kemp was confident that Through the Barricades achieved the sound of live performance they were wanting. At the time of its release, he explained to Number One,

We've captured a lot of that live feel and raw energy on the new album. There are still a lot of misconceptions about us as a band. That's why we called it Through the Barricades. People still think we're all just posers and we can't play our instruments. They're not convinced until they see us play live.

== Songs ==
After the introductory track, the first song on the album is "Cross the Line", which Kemp described as "much more arena rock for Spandau." He credits their time with Def Leppard as having been his main influence in writing it.

Kemp wrote "Virgin" (originally titled "We Are Virgin") in response to seeing the "harmful" influence that television had on the children of the band's lead singer Tony Hadley. (Note: "'We Are Virgin', which we performed at Live Aid, is about Tony's kids. I saw him with his children in Ireland, which must be the most frightening situation for them ever. And it's frightening watching them: they're like little sponges that soak up and imitate everything they see. You think: my God, how much should you protect a child that's sitting in front of the TV watching everything from News at Ten to The A-Team? There's so much harmful junk… So 'We Are Virgin' is an anthem for them.") The band's manager, Steve Dagger, suggested performing it at Live Aid, and the band agreed, thinking such a great amount of exposure to a new song was a good idea. In retrospect, however, Kemp felt they should have only performed their hit songs and thought Dagger would agree that choosing to play "Virgin" instead was a mistake. (Note: "Yes, we should have done what Queen had done and did a medley of our hits, because we had enough, but I think [manager] Steve Dagger will say that it was one of his very, very few mistakes in the history of his management career, when he suggested it. We thought 'Virgin' was a really strong song – I don't think we'd written 'Fight For Ourselves' at that point, it was the first one I'd written – and we decided to debut a song and get some coverage out of it. And that was a real mistake, of course it was.")

=== "Through the Barricades" ===
Belfast native Thomas "Kidso" Reilly, who had worked for Spandau Ballet selling merchandise during their 1983 UK tour, became a casualty of The Troubles later that year when he was gunned down by a British soldier. When the band played in Belfast during their 1984 tour, Kemp got a first-hand look at the political climate there and was inspired to write "Through the Barricades", using what he had seen as the backdrop for a love song. Hadley found that the band's emotional attachment to the song made it more difficult for him to record the vocals. (Note: "When we recorded it there was a lot of pressure to get it right. I remember working on the vocals in the studio at Musicland, as Gary and the others watched from the control room. It was incredibly off-putting, everyone going on about the sentiment of the song, and how important it was.") Kemp later acknowledged that Hadley gave his best performance ever.

In the 2017 documentary, Kemp explained that during the mixing of the album they came up with the idea to use a "cinematic element" of the song as an introductory track for the album. Hadley provided the footsteps heard on the track. Kemp described it as "[v]ery sort of Floyd." (Note: Gary Kemp: "And it was not until the mix that we then thought, you know, what would be a great idea is if we took an element, a sort of cinematic element of '[Through the] Barricades' and had that at the beginning as an intro…" Gary Langan: "Like a little overture." Gary Kemp: "Yeah, like a little overture, and we decided to have some footsteps. Very sort of [Pink] Floyd. And who was that? Was that Tony?" Steve Norman: "Yeah.")

== Release and commercial performance ==
Through the Barricades was released on 17 November 1986 and received gold certification from the British Phonographic Industry on 25 November for reaching the 100,000 units of shipment threshold. It entered the UK Albums Chart on 29 November to begin a chart run of 19 weeks, the first of which was spent in its peak position at number 7. It also got as high as number 1 in Italy, number 3 in the Netherlands, number 6 on the European Albums chart and in Iceland, number 8 in Norway, number 9 in Germany, number 25 in Sweden and Switzerland, number 26 in Australia, number 27 in Finland, number 48 in New Zealand, number 79 in Japan, and number 84 in Canada. In the US the album was released on 20 March 1987. On 6 May of that year it received platinum certification in the UK for reaching shipment of 300,000 units.

The 2017 reissue was initially planned as a 30th anniversary edition, but because the master tapes had been recorded using a digital machine that had not been manufactured since the 1980s, it was difficult to find one to use to transfer the recordings. Because of the delay, they missed the deadline they needed to release the reissue the previous year. (Note: Gary Kemp: "To be honest, I wanted to get it out last year for the 30th anniversary, because we'd been doing that on the other packages, but we had a real problem with it because we recorded this on a particular digital machine, that was only in fashion for about a year, it seems. So the masters were all on this particular format (Mitsubishi X50). We couldn't find this particular machine anywhere. There was one in Holland, and then by the time someone tested it, it was broken. In the end, we found one in New York but it really took a few months, and we missed the deadline that we wanted, to get the reissue out on the 30th anniversary.")

== Reception ==
Professional ratings
Review scores
Source	Rating
AllMusic	2/5 stars
The Rolling Stone Album Guide	1.5/5 stars
Sounds	2/5 stars

At the time of its release Through the Barricades received mixed reviews from the North American trade magazines, some of which still thought the band's focus was on dance music and never acknowledged their transition to rock. RPM insisted that "Fight for Ourselves" "can definitely ignite dance floors". Cashbox only wrote, "Spandau teams with Art of Noise studio wiz Langan for a sonic tour de force of melodic, stimulating dance music." Billboard, however, was critical of the change, noting that "problems arise … when band ventures into harder-rockin' territory--a heavier touch from Art of Noise member Langan might have helped pull it off."

The UK music magazines also had a mixed response. Number One's Karen Swayne wrote that both the title song and the album showed that Kemp "still has a way with a catchy chorus and a sure commercial instinct". Vici MacDonald of Smash Hits gave two ratings in her review: "(Music: 7 out of 10; Lyrics: 2 out of 10)". She thought the lyrics were "terrible" but found the music "extremely spirited". Record Mirror's Roger Morton also felt the need to provide two ratings: "4 out of 5 for presentation; 1 out of 5 for daring". He opined that the songs were "ultimately neutered by the self-conscious classiness of it all".

Retrospective reviews were mostly critical. Paul Evans wrote a brief summary review of most of the Spandau Ballet album discography in The Rolling Stone Album Guide and gave Through the Barricades one and a half stars out of five, citing that the band "took a bizarre turn toward arena rock and power ballads." In a review for AllMusic, Dan LeRoy wrote, "Rocking up Spandau Ballet's smooth white-boy soul, Through the Barricades manages to avoid utter disaster via the tuneful creations of songwriter/guitarist Gary Kemp." LeRoy argued "the production and mix prove the undoing of this effort. Most of the tunes demand guitar and drum bombast; instead, the riff-rocking 'Cross the Line' and 'Fight for Ourselves', in particular, are undercut by the polite-sounding rhythm section." He praised the title-track, which he said "became a deserved hit."

== Singles ==
"Fight for Ourselves" was released as a 7-inch single in the UK on 14 July 1986 and peaked at number 15, making it their first lead single from any album not to make the top 10 there. While it did chart higher in Ireland, Italy and Spain and on the European Hot 100, its peak positions in other countries were mostly lower than that of the UK. (Note: "Fight for Ourselves" also got as high as number 5 in Italy, number 7 in Ireland, number 10 on the European Hot 100, number 11 in Spain, number 16 in Australia and the Netherlands, number 20 in Belgium, number 23 in Switzerland, number 32 in West Germany and number 33 in New Zealand.) Lead singer Tony Hadley wrote in his 2004 autobiography To Cut a Long Story Short that the mostly unimpressive numbers "hardly squared with our hopes of global success". Critics were mostly negative in their reviews. Although one described it as a "knockout", others summed it up as "crummy" and "absurdly paranoiac".

"Through the Barricades" was released in the UK on 27 October 1986 and peaked at number 6 on the UK Singles Chart. Although the band thought it would be successful, they were disappointed that it did not chart higher there. (Note: "We were confident it would be a huge hit. When it peaked at Number 6 in November ’86, we were all disappointed. It deserved to be a bigger hit.") It made the top 10 in several other countries (Note: "Through the Barricades" also went to number one in Italy and also reached number 2 in Spain, number 3 in the Netherlands, number 4 in Ireland, number 6 on the European Hot 100, number 7 in Norway, number 10 in Belgium, number 14 in West Germany and number 50 in Australia.) and received Silver certification from the British Phonographic Industry on 2 April 2021 for reaching the 200,000 units of shipment threshold. In the US, Cashbox magazine reviewed the song in its Single Releases column in its 20 June 1987 issue and recommended the single to retailers and radio stations. Opinions again varied overall, however, with one reviewer calling it the "best song" on the album and another concluding that "even the title song's beautifully crafted, doubtlessly sincere lament for Northern Ireland ends up sounding bogus".

"How Many Lies" was released in the UK on 2 February 1987 and peaked at number 34 on the UK Singles Chart. It charted higher in most of the handful of countries in which it found success. (Note: "How Many Lies" also reached number 5 in Italy, number 17 in Ireland, number 23 in the Netherlands, number 25 in Belgium, number 32 in Spain, number 66 on the European Hot 100 and number 86 in Canada.) In the US, Billboard and Cash Box magazines noted in their respective 21 March 1987 reviews of the song for US retailers and radio stations that "How Many Lies" was the first single released there from the Through the Barricades album. This song also elicited a variety of comments, with one critic labeling it "a masterpiece", another "The Pits".

== Aftermath ==
Dagger was especially bothered by how little promotion the album received from CBS in America. Kemp found their uninterest "ironic, given America was the reason we'd joined them in the first place". He told Dagger he blamed himself for not having repeatedly written reworkings of "True" to maintain their success. (Note: "He was haunted by the lack of interest shown by them towards the Barricades album, which was ironic, given America was the reason we'd joined them in the first place. 'It's my fault, Steve,' I told him one day. 'I keep changing our style. I should have just written 'True' over and over again.'")

In his autobiography Kemp speculated as to when the first signs that the band would break up began. (Note: "As I move back through this decade one question is beginning to circle above me: where did the end start?") He thought it was their time recording the album in France at Miraval (Note: "I think it's here, in Chateau Miraval Studios, Provence, where two young wannabe film producers are arriving, and the end may be about to begin.") when he was reunited with Dominic Anciano, with whom the band had worked on videos, and Ray Burdis, a classmate Kemp and his brother Martin, the band's bassist, knew from their time at the Anna Scher Theatre School. Anciano was there to hear the songs the band was interested in making into music videos. Burdis came to discuss his desire to have the Kemp brothers portray twin gangsters Ronnie and Reggie Kray in what would be the 1990 film The Krays. Their choice to participate in the film meant they were away from the studio as the band worked on their next album, Heart Like a Sky, which caused a rift between band members. (Note: "Becoming Ronnie didn't help. I was suddenly looking in two directions outside of the group. More importantly, the process was beginning to infringe upon the band's business. Martin and I were back with Anna Scher and Charles Verrall to do workshops for The Krays, which occasionally meant having to be absent from the recording studio during the making of the album ... it was helping to split the band into two camps, and Dagger was trying to hold us all together.") Kemp wrote, "For the rest of the band, the movie must have felt as though we were being unfaithful towards them. For my part, I felt they were being unfair, given all the commitment to the band I'd shown over the years."

== Track listing ==
All tracks are written by Gary Kemp.

No.	Title	Length
1.	"Barricades ‒ Introduction"	1:17
2.	"Cross the Line"	4:07
3.	"Man in Chains"	5:40
4.	"How Many Lies?"	5:21
5.	"Virgin"	4:23
6.	"Fight for Ourselves"	4:22
7.	"Swept"	4:53
8.	"Snakes and Lovers"	4:36
9.	"Through the Barricades"	5:58

2017 remastered edition bonus tracks
No.	Title	Length
10.	"Fight For Ourselves" (Extended Remix)	7:27
11.	"Fight... The Heartache"	4:12
12.	"Through The Barricades" (Extended Version)	7:09
13.	"Cross The Line" (Extended Version)	6:17
14.	"How Many Lies?" (Instrumental)	5:24
15.	"Fight The Heartache" (Alternate Version)	3:17
16.	"Through The Barricades" (Original One Track Gary Kemp Vocal Guide Demo)	4:52

== Personnel ==
=== Spandau Ballet ===
- Tony Hadley – lead and backing vocals
- Gary Kemp – guitars
- Martin Kemp – bass
- John Keeble – drums
- Steve Norman – percussion, saxophones

=== Additional musicians ===
- Toby Chapman – keyboards, synthesizers
- Ruby James – backing vocals
- Shirley Lewis – backing vocals
- Helena Springs – backing vocals

=== Technical ===
- Spandau Ballet – production
- Gary Langan – production, engineering
- Stephan Wissnet – engineering assistance
- Andy Pearson – drum technician
- Catherine Bell – project coordination
- Jackie Vickers – project coordination
- Zoe Vickers – project coordination
- Gary Movat – design
- Assorted Images – design
- Nick Knight – sleeve photography

== Charts ==
=== Weekly charts ===
Weekly chart performance for Through the Barricades
Chart (1986–1987)	Peak position
Australian Albums (Kent Music Report)	26
Canada Top Albums/CDs (RPM)	84
Dutch Albums (Album Top 100)	6
European Albums (Music & Media)	6
Finnish Albums (Suomen virallinen lista)	27
German Albums (Offizielle Top 100)	9
Icelandic Albums (Tónlist)	6
Italian Albums (Musica e dischi)	1
Japanese Albums (Oricon)	79
New Zealand Albums (RMNZ)	48
Norwegian Albums (VG-lista)	8
Swedish Albums (Sverigetopplistan)	25
Swiss Albums (Schweizer Hitparade)	25
UK Albums (Official Charts)	7

=== Year-end charts ===
1986 year-end chart performance for Through the Barricades
Chart (1986)	Position
UK Albums (Gallup)	75

1987 year-end chart performance for Through the Barricades
Chart (1987)	Position
Dutch Albums (Album Top 100)	25
European Albums (Music & Media)	61
German Albums (Offizielle Top 100)	59

== Certifications ==
Certifications for Through the Barricades
Region	Certification	Certified units/sales
Netherlands (NVPI)	Gold	50,000^{^}
Spain (Promusicae)	Gold	50,000^{^}
United Kingdom (BPI)	Platinum	300,000^{^}
^{^} Shipments figures based on certification alone.

== Bibliography ==
- Hadley, Tony (2004). To Cut a Long Story Short. London: Sidgwick & Jackson. ISBN 978-0-283-07386-1.
- Kemp, Gary (2009). I Know This Much: From Soho to Spandau. London: Fourth Estate. ISBN 978-0-00-732330-2.
