= Fight for Ourselves =

Single by Spandau Ballet

from the album Through the Barricades
- B-side: "Fight… The Heartache"
- Released: 14 July 1986
- Recorded: Winter 1986
- Studio: Musicland (Munich, West Germany)
- Length: 4:19 (single/album version); 7:30 (extended remix)
- Label: CBS
- Songwriter: Gary Kemp
- Producers: Gary Langan; Spandau Ballet

Spandau Ballet singles chronology
"Round and Round" (1984)	"Fight for Ourselves" (1986)	"Through the Barricades" (1986)

"Fight for Ourselves" is a song by the English new wave band Spandau Ballet, released as the first single from their 1986 album Through the Barricades. In their native UK, the song reached number 15 on the UK Singles Chart, and reviews were mostly negative.

== Background ==
As Spandau Ballet was touring to promote their 1983 album True, they noticed an improvement in how they were performing together and wanted to capture the chemistry of their live shows on their next studio album. (Note: "While we were on tour last year we really gelled together as a unit,… and we wanted to get some of that feeling into this LP. True was very different live from on record. With this LP we didn't want to have such a large gap.") They attempted this shift with True co-producers Tony Swain and Steve Jolley on their 1984 album Parade, but the band's songwriter/guitarist Gary Kemp was unsatisfied with the result: "I think we were a bit afraid of making a big jump after True. The trouble was that Parade the record wasn't like we did it live. People went home and were disappointed by the record." He explained, "We're a rock band now."

The band decided to change producers since they did not feel Swain and Jolley could help them attain the sound they were after. (Note: "We wanted to move on from Swain and Jolley, we wanted a bigger, meatier sound, one more suitable to the arenas we were now playing.") They chose to try out Gary Langan, a recording engineer they met while working with Trevor Horn, (Note: "An engineer cum co-producer was what we were after and Gary Langan was our first choice. He'd been Trevor's engineer for years and had worked with us on the fateful Pleasure Project.") in the role of co-producer of one song for their Parade follow-up to see if they worked well together before committing to an entire album with him in that capacity. (Note: "We would go back to Munich and record one track to see how things went. If it worked, we’d take on the album with him.") The song they chose for their test run was originally titled "Everybody (We've Got to Fight for Ourselves)". They recorded what became known as "Fight for Ourselves" in the winter of 1986 (Note: "Working in Germany in the wintery new year of 1986, we got off to a great start with the song 'Fight For Ourselves' and rubber-stamped Langan through into continuing the co-production of the whole album with us.") at Musicland Studios in Munich and decided to keep Langan on as co-producer for the entire album.

== Release and commercial performance ==
"Fight for Ourselves" was released in the UK on 14 July 1986 and peaked at number 15 on the UK Singles Chart, making it their first lead single from any album not to make the top 10 there. It also got as high as number 5 in Italy, number 7 in Ireland, number 10 on the European Hot 100, number 11 in Spain, number 16 in Australia and the Netherlands, number 20 in Belgium, number 23 in Switzerland, number 32 in West Germany and number 33 in New Zealand. Lead singer Tony Hadley wrote in his 2004 autobiography To Cut a Long Story Short that the mostly unimpressive numbers "hardly squared with our hopes of global success".

== Critical reception ==
Most reviews of the song upon its release were negative. As a guest critic for Smash Hits magazine, singer and Parade cover model Samantha Fox opined that it was not very good. Stuart Bailie of Record Mirror described it as "crummy", explaining, "There's a mid-tempo ordinariness about the whole thing, with Steve Norman playing that same old sax solo and a very indifferent vocal from Tony Hadley." Roy Wilkinson of Sounds summed up the song as "absurdly paranoiac". Number One's Andrew Panos, however, called "Fight" a "knockout". He thought its chorus was reminiscent of "Chant No. 1 (I Don't Need This Pressure On)" and liked Kemp's "funky guitar picking", Norman's "sexy sax work" and Hadley's "restrained" vocals.

In a retrospective review of the Through the Barricades album, Dan LeRoy of AllMusic wrote, "Most of the tunes demand guitar and drum bombast; instead, the riff-rocking 'Cross the Line' and 'Fight for Ourselves', in particular, are undercut by the polite-sounding rhythm section."

== Music video ==
The story line for the music video involves two young women (one of whom is played by Paul Young's then-girlfriend Stacey Smith) who sneak into a Spandau Ballet concert and use their power to make themselves invisible in order to make out with band members during the performance of the song. Chroma key was used for the disappearing and reappearing sequences. The video was directed by Simon Milne. Concert venue exteriors were shot at 43 King Street, Covent Garden, London.

== Track listings ==
- 7-inch single

A. "Fight for Ourselves" – 4:19
B. "Fight… The Heartache" – 4:10

- 12-inch single

A. "Fight for Ourselves" (extended remix) – 7:30
B1. "Fight for Ourselves" – 4:19
B2. "Fight… The Heartache" – 4:10

== Charts ==
Weekly chart performance for "Fight for Ourselves"
Chart (1986–1987)	Peak position
Australia (Kent Music Report)	16
Belgium (Ultratop 50 Flanders)	20
Europe (European Hot 100 Singles)	10
Finland (Suomen virallinen lista)	16
Ireland (IRMA)	7
Italy (Musica e dischi)	5
Luxembourg (Radio Luxembourg)	8
Netherlands (Dutch Top 40)	16
Netherlands (Single Top 100)	18
New Zealand (Recorded Music NZ)	33
Spain (AFYVE)	11
Switzerland (Schweizer Hitparade)	23
UK Singles (OCC)	15
West Germany (GfK)	32

== Bibliography ==
- Hadley, Tony (2004). To Cut a Long Story Short. London: Sidgwick & Jackson. ISBN 978-0-283-07386-1.
- Kemp, Gary (2009). I Know This Much: From Soho to Spandau. London: Fourth Estate. ISBN 978-0-00-732330-2.
