= Gary Langan =

English engineer, musician and record producer (born 1956)

- Birth name: Gary Michael Langan
- Born: 19 April 1956 (age 69); Surrey, England
- Genres: Rock; synth-pop; electronic; avant-garde; new wave
- Occupations: Engineer; record producer; mixer; musician
- Instruments: Keyboards; synthesizer
- Years active: 1975–present
- Formerly of: Art of Noise

Gary Michael Langan (born 19 April 1956) is an English engineer, record producer, mixer and musician.

== Biography ==
Langan's career started at age 18 when he worked as an assistant engineer at Sarm East Studios, learning the craft from Gary Lyons and Mike Stone, whom he assisted on the Queen albums A Night at the Opera, A Day at the Races, and News of the World. After engineering for John Sinclair (co-founder of Sarm (East), together with sister Jill Sinclair, G. Lyons and M. Stone) on his band Levinsky/Sinclair's 1979 single "Only Feel This Way" and for Trevor Horn on 90125 by Yes, Langan would produce Beauty Stab by ABC and, later, Through the Barricades by Spandau Ballet.

In 1983, Langan co-founded the ZTT Records label with Trevor Horn, Paul Morley and Jill Sinclair. He was also a founding member of the avant-garde synthpop group Art of Noise, but departed in 1986 after touring in support of the group's In Visible Silence album.

In 1986, Langan co-produced Belouis Some's album Belouis Some in New York City with Dire Straits keyboardist/guitarist Guy Fletcher.

Langan co-produced Public Image Ltd's 1987 album Happy?.

2005 saw Langan creating the SACD mix for the re-issue of Jeff Wayne's Musical Version of The War of the Worlds.

In 2008, Langan produced the ABC album Traffic.

In April 2009, Langan took charge of the front of house duties for ABC at the Royal Albert Hall. The concert was also not only a reunion for various members of the band, but also for the team involved in the making of The Lexicon of Love. Anne Dudley arranged the songs for, and conducted the BBC Concert Orchestra, Trevor Horn supplied a speech and backing vocals.

== Selected studio work excluding Art of Noise ==
=== Charted singles ===
- 1975: "Bohemian Rhapsody" Queen; assistant engineer; No. 1
- 1976: "You're My Best Friend" Queen; assistant engineer; No. 7
- 1977: "Tie Your Mother Down" Queen; assistant engineer; No. 31
- 1977: Queen's First E.P Queen; assistant engineer; No. 17
- 1977: "We Are the Champions" Queen; assistant engineer; No. 2
- 1978: "Spread Your Wings" Queen; assistant engineer; No. 34
- 1979: "Video Killed the Radio Star" The Buggles; engineer; No. 1
- 1980: "The Plastic Age" The Buggles; engineer; No. 16
- 1980: "Clean Clean" The Buggles; engineer; No. 38
- 1980: "Elstree" The Buggles; engineer; No. 55
- 1981: "Hand Held in Black and White" Dollar; engineer; No. 19
- 1981: "Mirror Mirror (Mon Amour)" Dollar; engineer; No. 4
- 1982: "Poison Arrow" ABC; engineer; No. 6
- 1982: "Give Me Back My Heart" Dollar; engineer; No. 4
- 1982: "Save Us" Philip Jap; engineer; No. 53
- 1982: "The Look of Love" ABC; engineer; No. 4
- 1982: "Don’t Stop" The Mood; engineer; No. 59
- 1982: "Paris Is One Day Away" The Mood; engineer; No. 42
- 1982: "Videotheque" Dollar; engineer; No. 17
- 1982: "All of My Heart" ABC; engineer; No. 5
- 1982: "Buffalo Gals" Malcolm McLaren and The World Famous Supreme Team; engineer; No. 9
- 1983: "Soweto" Malcolm McLaren; engineer; No. 32
- 1983: "Double Dutch" Malcolm McLaren; engineer; No. 3
- 1983: "That Was Then but This Is Now" ABC; produced with ABC; No. 18
- 1983: "Owner of a Lonely Heart" Yes; engineer; No. 28
- 1983: "Duck for the Oyster" Malcolm McLaren; engineer; No. 54
- 1984: "S.O.S." ABC; produced with ABC; No. 18
- 1984: "Leave It" Yes; engineer; No. 56
- 1984: "Absolute" Scritti Politti; mixed; No. 11
- 1984: "Flesh for Fantasy (Below the Belt Mix)" Billy Idol; remix; No. 54
- 1984: "Hypnotize" Scritti Politti; mixed; No. 68
- 1985: "Gun Law" Kane Gang; remix engineer; No. 53
- 1985: "Wide Boy" Nik Kershaw; remix; No. 9
- 1985: "The Broken Years" Hipsway; producer; No. 72
- 1985: "White Wedding (Parts I & II) (Shotgun Mix)" Billy Idol; remix; No. 6
- 1986: "Living in the Past" Drum Theatre; producer; No. 67
- 1986: "The Honeythief" Hipsway; producer; No. 10
- 1986: "Home Is Where the Heart Is" Drum Theatre; producer; No. 91
- 1986: "Fight for Ourselves" Spandau Ballet; produced with Spandau Ballet; No. 15
- 1986: "To Be a Lover" Billy Idol; mixed; No. 22
- 1986: "Through the Barricades" Spandau Ballet; produced with Spandau Ballet; No. 6
- 1987: "Eldorado" Drum Theatre; producer; No. 44
- 1987: "How Many Lies" Spandau Ballet; produced with Spandau Ballet; No. 34
- 1987: "Don't Need a Gun" Billy Idol; mixed; No. 26
- 1987: "Let It Be with You" Belouis Some; producer and recording engineer; No. 53
- 1987: "Sweet Sixteen" Billy Idol; mixed; No. 17
- 1987: "Seattle" Public Image Ltd; produced with P.I.L.; No. 47
- 1987: "The Body" Public Image Ltd.; produced with P.I.L.; No. 100
- 1987: "Alright Now" Pepsi & Shirlie; producer; No. 50
- 1988: "Talk Free" Empire; remix; No. 97
- 1988: "Raw" Spandau Ballet; produced with Gary Kemp and Spandau Ballet; No. 47
- 1989: "Big Area" Then Jerico; producer; No. 13
- 1989: "Only the Lonely" T'Pau; remix and additional production; No. 28
- 1989: "Be Free with Your Love" Spandau Ballet; produced with Martin Kemp; No. 42
- 1989: "Smoke on the Water" Rock Aid Armenia; producer with Geoffrey Downes; No. 39
- 1990: "You Make Me Feel (Mighty Real) (Remix)" Jimmy Somerville; remix; No. 5
- 1990: "Heaven Give Me Words" Propaganda; mixed; No. 36
- 1990: "Only One World" Propaganda; mixed; No. 71
- 1990: "Stranger to the Rain" Frances Ruffelle; produced with Anne Dudley; No. 91
- 1992: "Fair Blows the Wind for France" Pele; produced and mixed; No. 62
- 1996: "12 Reasons Why I Love Her" My Life Story; mixed and additional production; No. 32
- 1996: "Sparkle" My Life Story; producer; No. 34
- 1997: "The King of Kissingdom" My Life Story; producer; No. 35
- 1997: "Monday Morning 5:19 (Widescreen)" Rialto; engineer; No. 37
- 1998: "What I Miss the Most" The Aloof; engineered and mixed; No. 70
- 1999: "To Earth with Love" Gay Dad; recorded and mixed; No. 10
- 1999: "Joy" Gay Dad; recorded and mixed; No. 22
- 1999: "Oh Jim" Gay Dad; recorded and mixed; No. 47
- 2001: "Someone Like You" Dina Carroll; mix engineer; No. 38
- 2001: "That Day" Natalie Imbruglia; recorded drums; No. 11
- 2001: "What's Going On (London Version)" Artists Against AIDS Worldwide; engineer; No. 6
- 2009: "Palladio" Escala; recording engineer; No. 39

=== Charted albums ===
- 1975: A Night at the Opera Queen; assistant engineer; No. 1
- 1976: On Tour David Essex; assistant engineer; No. 51
- 1976: A Day at the Races; assistant engineer; No. 1
- 1977: News of the World Queen; assistant engineer; No. 4
- 1980: The Age of Plastic; engineer; No. 27
- 1980: Drama Yes; engineer; No. 2
- 1982: Diamond Spandau Ballet; engineer; No. 17
- 1982: The Lexicon of Love ABC; engineer; No. 1
- 1983: Duck Rock Malcolm McLaren; engineer, performer; No. 18
- 1983: Beauty Stab ABC; produced with ABC; No. 17
- 1983: 90125 Yes; engineer; No. 16
- 1984: San Damiano (Heart & Soul) Sal Solo; mixed; No. 15
- 1984: One Eyed Jacks Spear of Destiny; mixed; No. 22
- 1984: Would Ya Like More Scratchin' Malcolm McLaren and World's Famous Supreme Team; engineer; No. 44
- 1986: Whiplash Smile; Billy Idol; mixed; No. 8
- 1986: Through The Barricades; Spandau Ballet; produced with Spandau Ballet; engineer; No. 7
- 1987: Happy?; Public Image Ltd. producer; No. 40
- 1989: Dress For Excess; Sigue Sigue Sputnik; mixed; No. 53
- 1990: 1234; Propaganda; mixed; No. 46
- 1996: Eclectic; Big Country; produced with Big Country; recorded; No. 41
- 1997: The Golden Mile; My Life Story; producer; No. 36
- 1999: Leisure Noise; Gay Dad; recorded and mixed; No. 14
- 2001: Pleased To Meet You; James; engineer; No. 11
- 2004: The Moment; Lisa Stansfield; live vocal sessions and band engineer; No. 57
- 2005: Jeff Wayne's Musical Version of the War of the Worlds; Jeff Wayne; sound restoration; 5.1 surround and new mixes; No. 8
- 2006: Classics; Sarah Brightman; engineer; No. 8
- 2009: Escala; Escala; engineer; No. 2
- 2011: Soul 2; Seal; engineer; No. 17
