= Thomas Dolby discography =

- Studio albums: 5
- EPs: 6
- Soundtrack albums: 5
- Live albums: 4
- Compilation albums: 9
- Singles: 25
- Video albums: 6

This is the discography of British singer-songwriter and musician Thomas Dolby.

== Albums ==
=== Studio albums ===
Title	Album details	Peak chart positions								
Title	Album details	UK	AUS	CAN	FIN	NL	NZ	SWE	US	US R&B
The Golden Age of Wireless	Released: 10 May 1982; Label: Venice in Peril; Formats: LP, MC	65	72	8	—	—	21	—	13	45
The Flat Earth	Released: 6 February 1984; Label: Parlophone, Capitol; Formats: LP, MC	14	71	21	25	18	28	50	35	—
Aliens Ate My Buick	Released: 25 April 1988; Label: EMI-Manhattan; Formats: CD, LP, MC	30	76	76	—	72	43	—	70	—
Astronauts & Heretics	Released: 27 July 1992; Label: Virgin; Formats: CD, LP, MC	35	123	—	—	—	—	—	—	—
A Map of the Floating City	Released: 24 October 2011; Label: Lost Toy People; Formats: LP, digital download	171	—	—	—	—	—	—	—	—
"—" denotes releases that did not chart or were not released in that territory.

=== Live albums ===
Title	Album details
Forty	Released: December 2001; Label: Lost Toy People; Formats: CD
The Sole Inhabitant	Released: November 2006; Label: Lost Toy People; Formats: CD
Live at SXSW	Released: July 2007; Label: Lost Toy People; Formats: CD; With the Jazz Mafia Horns
Live in Tokyo 2012	Released: 30 May 2012; Label: Meguro; Formats: CD+DVD; Japan-only release

=== Soundtrack albums ===
Title	Album details
Howard the Duck	Released: July 1986; Label: MCA; Formats: LP, MC; Split album – one side by Dolby's Cube, the other by John Barry
Gothic	Released: 23 February 1987; Label: Virgin; Formats: CD, LP, MC
Toys	Released: 1992; Label: Geffen; Formats: CD, LP, Cassette; "The Mirror Song" performed by Thomas Dolby with Robin Williams and Joan Cusack; Written by Trevor Horn/Bruce Woolley
The Gate to the Mind's Eye	Released: 25 October 1994; Label: Giant; Formats: CD, MC
The Invisible Lighthouse	Released: 2013; Label: Lost Toy People; Formats: CD
Double Switch – 25 Anniversary Edition	Released: March 2019; Label: Limited Run Games/Screaming Villains; Formats: LP, MC; Limited release of the soundtrack to the 1993 video album

=== Compilation albums ===
Title	Album details
Retrospectacle – The Best of Thomas Dolby	Released: 7 February 1994; Label: EMI, Capitol; Formats: CD, MC
Premium Gold Collection	Released: June 1997; Label: EMI; Formats: CD; Netherlands-only release
Hyperactive	Released: February 1999; Label: Disky; Formats: CD
Hyperactive!	Released: 15 March 1999; Label: EMI; Formats: CD
12x12 Original Remixes	Released: 2 August 1999; Label: EMI; Formats: CD
Blinded with Science	Released: 17 July 2000; Label: EMI; Formats: CD
The Singular Thomas Dolby	Released: 18 May 2009; Label: EMI; Formats: CD+DVD, digital download
Original Album Series	Released: 11 November 2016; Label: Parlophone; Formats: 5xCD box set
Hyperactive	Released: 27 July 2018; Label: BMG; Formats: 2xCD

=== Video albums ===
Title	Album details
"Live Wireless"	Released: November 1983; Label: Hendring, Thorn EMI Video; Formats: VHS, Betamax, LaserDisc
Thomas Dolby	Released: 1984; Label: PolyGram Video; Formats: VHS, VHD, Betamax, LaserDisc
The Golden Age of Video – 12 of His Best Videos	Released: 1989; Label: Picture Music International; Formats: VHS, LaserDisc
The Gate to the Mind's Eye	Released: 1994; Label: BMG Video, Miramar; Formats: VHS, LaserDisc
The Sole Inhabitant	Released: 2006; Label: Lost Toy People; Formats: DVD
Live in Chicago	Released: 2007; Label: Lost Toy People; Formats: DVD

== EPs ==
Title	Album details	Peak chart positions	
Title	Album details	CAN	US
Blinded by Science	Released: January 1983; Label: Harvest/Venice in Peril; Formats: 12", LP, MC	3	20
One of Our Submarines	Released: 1 November 2002; Label: Salz; Formats: CD, 2x12"; With Salz	—	—
Amerikana	Released: 16 June 2010; Label: Lost Toy People; Formats: digital download	—	—
Oceanea	Released: 29 November 2010; Label: Lost Toy People; Formats: CD, digital download	—	—
Return to Oceanea – Remix EP	Released: 2 February 2012; Label: Lost Toy People; Formats: digital download	—	—
Halloween: A Thomas Dolby Creation	Released: 20 October 2023; Label: BMG; Formats: digital download	—	—
"—" denotes releases that did not chart or were not released in that territory.

== Singles ==
Title	Year	Peak chart positions										Album
Title	Year	UK	AUS	CAN	FIN	GER	NL	NZ	US	US Dance	US Main	Album
"Urges"	1981	—	—	—	—	—	—	—	—	—	—	Originally a non-album release (Note: Later included on original US pressings of The Golden Age of Wireless.)
"Europa and the Pirate Twins"	1981	48	—	45 (Note: "Europa and the Pirate Twins" did not chart in the US and Canada until 1983, after the success of "She Blinded Me with Science".)	—	—	—	—	67	—	37	The Golden Ages of Wireless
"Airwaves"	1982	— (Note: This single did not enter the UK Singles Chart, but did reach number 130 on the Record Business Bubbling Under Singles 101–150 chart.)	—	—	—	—	—	—	—	—	—	The Golden Ages of Wireless
"Radio Silence"	1982	—	—	—	—	—	—	—	—	—	—	The Golden Ages of Wireless
"Windpower"	1982	31	—	—	—	—	—	—	—	—	—	The Golden Ages of Wireless
"She Blinded Me with Science" (b/w "One of Our Submarines")	1982	49	19	1	—	52	—	7	5	3	6; 17	Originally a non-album release (Note: Both tracks were included on the EP Blinded by Science and were also later added to all reissues of The Golden Age of Wireless.)
"Get Out of My Mix" (as Dolby's Cube)	1983	80	—	—	—	—	—	—	—	—	—	Non-album release
"Hyperactive!"	1984	17	26	16	21	—	—	41	62	37	39	The Flat Earth
"I Scare Myself"	1984	46	—	—	—	—	26	—	—	—	—	The Flat Earth
"Dissidents"	1984	90	—	—	—	—	—	—	—	17	—	The Flat Earth
"Field Work" (Ryuichi Sakamoto featuring Thomas Dolby)	1985	98	—	—	—	—	—	—	—	—	—	Originally a non-album release (Note: Later included on Sakamoto's album Illustrated Musical Encyclopedia, which was the international release of Ongaku Zukan.)
"May the Cube Be with You" (as Dolby's Cube)	1985	82	—	—	—	—	—	—	—	—	—	Originally a non-album release (Note: Included on the CD release of Aliens Ate My Buick.)
"Howard the Duck" (as Dolby's Cube featuring Cherry Bomb)	1986	—	—	—	—	—	—	—	—	—	—	Howard the Duck soundtrack
"The Devil Is an Englishman" (Screamin' Lord Byron featuring Thomas Dolby and Timothy Spall)	1987	—	—	—	—	—	—	—	—	—	—	Gothic soundtrack
"Airhead"	1988	53	69	—	—	—	—	—	—	6	—	Aliens Ate My Buick
"Hot Sauce"	1989	80	—	—	—	—	—	—	—	—	—	Aliens Ate My Buick
"My Brain Is Like a Sieve"	1989	—	—	—	—	—	—	—	—	—	—	Aliens Ate My Buick
"Close but No Cigar"	1992	22	107	—	—	88	—	14	—	—	—	Astronauts & Heretics
"I Love You Goodbye"	1992	36	155	—	—	—	—	—	—	—	—	Astronauts & Heretics
"Silk Pyjamas"	1992	62	—	—	—	—	—	—	—	—	—	Astronauts & Heretics
"Hyperactive!" (re-release)	1994	23	—	—	—	—	—	—	—	—	—	Retrospectacle
"Quantum Mechanic" (Germany-only release)	1995	—	—	—	—	—	—	—	—	—	—	The Gate to the Mind's Eye soundtrack
"Blinded by Chemicals" (vs. James Doman)	2004	—	—	—	—	—	—	—	—	—	—	Non-album release
"Spice Train" (promo-only release)	2011	—	—	—	—	—	—	—	—	—	—	A Map of the Floating City
"I'm Thomas Dolby" (with JG and the Robots)	2021	—	—	—	—	—	—	—	—	—	—	Non-album release
"—" denotes releases that did not chart or were not released in that territory.

== Contributions ==
Year	Title	Artist	Contribution
1979	English Garden	Bruce Woolley and the Camera Club	Keyboards
1980	Drip Dry Zone	Local Heroes SW9	Keyboards
1981	"New Toy"	Lene Lovich	Wrote, keyboards
1981	"Dream Soldiers"	The Fallout Club	Wrote, synthesiser, backing vocals, producer
1981	Black Snake Diamond Röle	Robyn Hitchcock	Keyboards only on "Love"
1981	"Ghost Train"	Bruce Woolley	Co-wrote, keyboards
1981	4	Foreigner	Main synthesiser
1981	"Year 2000"	Jane Kennaway	Wrote, producer
1981	"Jungle Line"	Low Noise	Vocals, electronics, producer
1981	Walk Under Ladders	Joan Armatrading	Synthesiser on 6 tracks
1981	"Wonderlust"	The Fallout Club	Wrote, synthesiser, producer
1981	Pleasure	Girls at Our Best!	Synthesiser
1982	"I Got You Babe"	Holly & Joey	Synthesiser
1982	Set	Thompson Twins	Additional synthesiser on 3 tracks
1982	Famous Last Words	M	Synthesiser
1982	No Man's Land	Lene Lovich	Synthesiser only on "Rocky Road"
1982	"Sex Machine"	Jack Heard	Synthesiser
1983	Pyromania	Def Leppard	Keyboards (credited as Booker T. Boffin)
1983	Duck Rock	Malcolm McLaren	Keyboards
1983	"Build Me a Bridge"	Adele Bertei	Producer
1983	Beauty Life	Trevor Herion	Arrangement only of "Kiss of No Return"
1983	Whodini	Whodini	Synthesiser, co-wrote and produced 2 tracks
1984	I Hear I See I Learn	The Group	Co-producer of "Technology"
1985	Steve McQueen	Prefab Sprout	Instruments, producer, mixing
1985	Some of My Best Jokes Are Friends	George Clinton	Keyboards, synthesiser, producer and lead vocals on 2 tracks
1985	Dog Eat Dog	Joni Mitchell	Keyboards, synthesiser, programming, vocals, co-producer
1987	Heaven on Earth	Belinda Carlisle	Additional keyboards
1988	From Langley Park to Memphis	Prefab Sprout	Keyboards and producer of 4 tracks
1988	Chalk Mark in a Rain Storm	Joni Mitchell	Keyboards only on "Dancin' Clown"
1988	Descanso dominical	Mecano	Engineer
1988	Álex & Christina	Álex & Christina	Engineer
1988	Vivir al este del Edén	La Unión	Engineer
1989	Desert Wind	Ofra Haza	Keyboards, backing vocals, programming, producer, mixing, producer, writing
1990	The Wall – Live in Berlin	Roger Waters	Keytar, vocals
1990	Jordan: The Comeback	Prefab Sprout	Producer
1991	Aidalai	Mecano	Engineer
1992	Mirmama	Eddi Reader	Remix only of "What You Do with What You've Got"
1992	"Funny Five Minutes"	Chris Braide	Producer
1992	El cielo lo sabe	Distrito 14	Engineer
1993	We're Back: A Dinosaur's Story	James Horner	Keyboard, writing and producer of 2 tracks
1999	Headspace Music Library V1: Reverie	Headspace	Composer of all tracks except 2
1999	Headspace Music Library V6: Backyard Sunset	Headspace	Co-composer of "Sunlane"
2002	Side Three	The Soft Boys	Keyboards only on "Evil Guy"
2007	Live from New York at Studio 54	Lene Lovich	Keyboards; archive material
2010	Electro Pioneers	Space Cowboy	Remix only of "My Egyptian Lover"
2017	Dangerous Friends	The Fallout Club	Keyboards; composer of 2 tracks, producer of 4 tracks; archive material
2022	"I'm Not Your Dog"	Todd Rundgren	Co-writer
