= A Map of the Floating City =

A Map of The Floating City

Studio album by Thomas Dolby
- Released: 24 October 2011
- Recorded: 2009–2011
- Studio: The Nutmeg of Consolation, Suffolk, England
- Genre: New wave
- Length: 52:37
- Label: Lost Toy People
- Producer: Thomas Dolby

Thomas Dolby chronology
Astronauts & Heretics (1992)	A Map of The Floating City (2011)	Return to Oceanea – Remix EP (2012)

A Map of the Floating City is the fifth studio album by English new wave/synth-pop musician Thomas Dolby, released on 24 October 2011. It was Dolby's first full-length studio album since 1992's Astronauts & Heretics and his last to date.

== Background ==
The album was recorded "aboard a solar and wind-powered 1930s lifeboat" on the coast of East Anglia, and includes contributions from Mark Knopfler, Regina Spektor, Natalie MacMaster, Bruce Woolley, Ethel and Imogen Heap.

Many tracks from the album were released/premiered prior to the release of the complete album. "Love Is a Loaded Pistol" was premiered at the TED conference in Long Beach, CA in February 2010, and was later released as a free MP3 download. "Road to Reno", "The Toad Lickers", and "17 Hills" were released as a digital EP, Amerikana, that was sold on Dolby's website in June 2010. "Oceanea", "Simone", and "To the Lifeboats" were released as another digital EP, Oceanea, in November 2010, and as a physical disc in March 2011. Three tracks were performed live for WNYC Soundcheck in February 2011 with the help of New York string quartet Ethel and accordion player Rachelle Garniez.

The album's concept, set in an alternative history, was accompanied by a web-based social networking game designed with the help of Andrea Phillips and J. J. Abrams. The game ran from June to September 2011, and the group that won the game received a private Dolby concert.

"Nothing New Under the Sun", "Spice Train", "Evil Twin Brother", and "A Jealous Thing Called Love" were revealed within the online game in July and August 2011. Prior to the inception of the game, Dolby had planned to release these songs as a third EP, Urbanoia.

== Track listing ==
All songs written by Thomas Dolby.

1. "Nothing New Under the Sun" – 4:35
2. "Spice Train" – 5:08
3. "Evil Twin Brother" – 5:25
4. "A Jealous Thing Called Love" – 4:27
5. "Road to Reno" – 4:00
6. "The Toad Lickers" – 4:24
7. "17 Hills" – 7:42
8. "Love Is a Loaded Pistol" – 2:57
9. "Oceanea" – 4:28
10. "Simone" – 5:56
11. "To the Lifeboats" – 3:36

=== Deluxe edition bonus disc ===
1. "Nothing New Under the Sun" (Instrumental) – 4:30
2. "Spice Train" (Instrumental) – 5:09
3. "Evil Twin Brother" (Instrumental) – 5:04
4. "A Jealous Thing Called Love" (Instrumental) – 4:27
5. "Road to Reno" (Instrumental) – 4:02
6. "The Toad Lickers" (Instrumental) – 4:24
7. "17 Hills" (Instrumental) – 7:42
8. "Love Is a Loaded Pistol" (Instrumental) – 2:57
9. "Oceanea" (Instrumental) – 3:59
10. "Simone" (Instrumental) – 5:56
11. "To the Lifeboats" (Instrumental) – 3:38
12. "Spice Train" (Radio Edit) – 3:42
13. "17 Hills" (Demo) – 5:46
14. "I'm Not Your Dog" – 5:48

== Personnel ==
Credits refer to original album and are attributed as per liner notes.

Musicians

- Thomas Dolby – vocals (tracks 1–11), keyboards (tracks 1–4, 11), synthesizer (tracks 5–7, 9, 10), piano (tracks 5–10), sampler (tracks 9, 10)
- Kevin Armstrong – guitar (tracks 1–7), backing vocals (track 10), electric guitar (track 11), acoustic guitar (track 11)
- Matthew Seligman – bass (tracks 1, 5, 6, 11)
- Mat Hector – drums (track 1)
- Nat Martin – additional rhythm guitar (track 1)
- Kevin Robinson – trumpet (tracks 1, 2)
- Francis Shelley – backing vocals (track 2)
- Nicki Wells – backing vocals (track 2)
- Ethel – strings (tracks 2, 3, 7, 8)
- Jeffrey Wash – fretless bass (tracks 3, 7)
- Jason Paige – guest lead vocal (track 3)
- Regina Spektor – Russian voiceover (track 3)
- Chucho Merchán – acoustic bass (tracks 4, 10)
- Bruce Woolley – backing vocals (track 4), theremin (track 10)
- The Jazz Mafia Horns – brass (track 4)
- Nic France – drums (tracks 4, 10)
- Bosco de Oliveira – percussion (tracks 4, 10)
- Liam Genockey – drums (tracks 5–7), percussion (track 11)
- Rich Armstrong – flugelhorn (track 5)
- Geoff Grange – harmonica (tracks 5, 6, 11)
- Crackers – accordion (track 6)
- Adele Bertei – backing vocals (track 6)
- Barbara Ann Spencer – backing vocals (track 6)
- Natalie MacMaster – fiddle (tracks 6, 7)
- Imogen Heap – Jew's harp (track 6)
- Mark Knopfler – lead guitar (track 7)
- Bruce Kaphan – pedal steel (track 7)
- Eddi Reader – guest vocal (track 9)
- John Parricelli – acoustic guitar (track 10)
- Lyndon J. Connah – backing vocals (track 10)
- Pedro Eustache – duduk (track 10)
- Joe Cohen – tenor sax (track 10)
- Neill MacColl – acoustic guitar (track 11)
- Pat Mastelotto – drums (track 11)

Technical

- Thomas Dolby – producer, string arrangements (tracks 2, 3, 7, 8), mixing (tracks 2–4, 8–11)
- Ralph Farris – string orchestration (tracks 2, 3, 7)
- Dorothy Lawson – string arrangement and orchestration (track 8)
- Mike Shipley – mixing (track 1)
- Bill Bottrell – mixing (tracks 5–7)
- Simon Heyworth – mastering
- Kathleen Beller – map art/handwriting/drawings
- Atherton-Chillieno – photography
- Nick Sinclair – photography
- Richard Skidmore – collage photograph
- Paul Sizer – graphic design
