= Forty (album) =

Forty Live: Limited Edition

Live album by Thomas Dolby
- Released: Dec 2001
- Genre: Pop, rock, electronic
- Length: 38:00
- Label: Lost Toy People

Professional ratings
Review scores
Source	Rating
Allmusic	3.5/5 stars

Forty Live: Limited Edition is a live album by English new wave/synth-pop musician Thomas Dolby, released in 2001. It was recorded at a gathering at his Half Moon Bay home in Northern California, celebrating his fortieth birthday, and at another private performance.

== Track listing ==
1. "The Ability to Swing" – 4:10
2. "Screen Kiss" – 5:33
3. "I Love You Goodbye" – 7:21
4. "I Scare Myself" – 5:56
5. "One of Our Submarines" – 5:35
6. "My Brain Is Like a Sieve" – 5:24
7. "Hyperactive" – 4:37

== Personnel ==
Musicians

- Thomas Dolby – vocals, keyboards, FX, samples
- Brian Salter – electronic wind instrument, keyboards
- Caroline Lavelle – cello, backing vocals
- Leslie Adams – additional vocals

Technical

- Tod Wollersheim – live sound, DA-88 recording
- Thomas Dolby – mixing
- Matt Levine – mixing
- Emanuel Geller – Pro Tools, mastering
- Sylvia Doelz – cover art
- Lawrence Thomas – layout, sleeve design
- Bob Gelman – inside photographs
