= Silk Pyjamas =

1992 single by Thomas Dolby

Single by Thomas Dolby

from the album Astronauts & Heretics
- B-side: "Field Work"
- Released: 14 September 1992
- Length: 3:38 (album version); 3:04 (edited version)
- Label: Virgin
- Songwriter: Thomas Dolby
- Producer: Thomas Dolby

Thomas Dolby singles chronology
"I Love You Goodbye" (1992)	"Silk Pyjamas" (1992)	"Hyperactive!" (1994)

Audio
- "Silk Pyjamas" on YouTube

"Silk Pyjamas" is a song by English singer and musician Thomas Dolby, released by Virgin Records on 14 September 1992 as the third and final single from his fourth studio album, Astronauts & Heretics (1992). The song, which was written and produced by Dolby, reached number 62 on the UK singles chart.

"Silk Pyjamas" was recorded with Cajun band BeauSoleil members Michael Doucet and Jimmy Breaux guesting on fiddle and accordion respectively.

== Music video ==
The song's accompanying music video was directed by Jonathan Teplitzky. It was filmed in the Plaza de la Catedral, Havana, Cuba, and was the first music video to have been shot there following the Cold War.

== Critical reception ==
Upon its release as a single, Stephen Dalton of the NME was negative in his review, writing, "Past-it professional knob-twiddler pretending to cartwheel with innocent joy around a godawful boogie-woogie rewrite of Adam Ant's 'Prince Charming'. One question: why?" In a retrospective review of Astronauts & Heretics, James Chrispell of AllMusic noted that the song "has a unique pastiche of sound to it and also a very memorable tune to go along".

== Track listings ==
7–inch and cassette single (UK and Europe)

1. "Silk Pyjamas" (edited version) – 3:04
2. "Field Work" (Long London Mix) (Ryuichi Sakamoto featuring Thomas Dolby) – 6:03

CD limited edition single #1 (UK and Europe)

1. "Silk Pyjamas" (edited version) – 3:04
2. "Field Work" (Long London Mix) – 6:03
3. "Puppet Theatre" – 4:14
4. "Get Out of My Mix" (Dolby's Cube) – 5:25

CD limited edition single #2 (UK and Europe)

1. "Silk Pyjamas" (album version) – 3:40
2. "Airhead" – 3:40
3. "Urges" – 3:40
4. "Leipzig" – 3:52

== Personnel ==
"Silk Pyjamas"

- Thomas Dolby – vocals, piano, organ
- Larry Treadwell – guitar
- Matthew Seligman – bass
- Michael Doucet – Cajun fiddle
- Jimmy Breaux – Cajun accordion
- Mr. Pits – backing vocals
- Loz Netto – backing vocals
- Marcus Wallis – backing vocals
- Laura Creamer – backing vocals

Production

- Thomas Dolby – production ("Silk Pyjamas", "Puppet Theatre", "Airhead", "Urges", "Leipzig"), mixing ("Field Work")
- Ryuichi Sakamoto – production and arrangement ("Field Work")
- Hajime Tachibana – arrangement ("Field Work")
- Bill Bottrell – production ("Airhead")
- Andy Partridge – production ("Urges", "Leipzig")

== Charts ==
Chart (1992)	Peak position
UK Singles (OCC)	62
UK Airplay (Music Week)	55
