= Close but No Cigar =

Close but No Cigar may refer to:

- "Close but No Cigar" (Thomas Dolby song), a song from the 1992 album Astronauts & Heretics
- "Close but No Cigar" ("Weird Al" Yankovic song), a song from the 2006 album Straight Outta Lynwood
- Close But No Cigar, a 2018 album by the Delvon Lamarr Organ Trio
