= I Love You, Goodbye =

I Love You, Goodbye may refer to:

- I Love You Goodbye a song by Thomas Dolby
- "I Love You, Goodbye" (song), a 1992 song by Céline Dion
- I Love You, Goodbye (film), a 2009 Filipino film
