= Little Lives =

Studio album by Adele Bertei
- Released: 1988
- Length: 41:39
- Label: Chrysalis
- Producer: Adele Bertei; Ian Price; Gary Spaniola; Gary Katz

Little Lives is the debut solo studio album by American singer Adele Bertei, released by Chrysalis Records in 1988.

== Background ==
Bertei originally signed as a solo artist with Geffen Records in 1981 and, with the success of her US dance hit single "Build Me a Bridge" in 1983, the singer-songwriter was due to record her debut solo album for the label. However, her relationship with the label became strained and subsequent recording sessions, where Bertei was "forced into working with a producer who I had not even met", resulted in her being dropped by the label. In 1985, she signed a new deal with Chrysalis Records and released the solo single "When It's Over". She then scored a US dance hit (and a UK hit) with "Just a Mirage", a collaboration with Jellybean, in 1988. Meanwhile, she recorded her solo album Litte Lives, which was released in 1988. The album did not achieve commercial success in the US, UK or Europe, but the single "Little Lives, Big Love" reached number 40 on the US Billboard Hot Adult Contemporary chart in November 1988.

== Critical reception ==
Upon its release, Amy Linden of Spin praised Little Lives as an album of "rich, eminently hummable and, dare one say, hopeful pop songs", which is "arranged with a quasi-jazzy/black AOR gloss". She concluded, "To call Little Lives a triumph would be a bit overblown, [but] that a small voice from the past could prove capable of something so fun, smart, musical, and mainstream, is a hoot." Billboard noted that Bertei "turns in a surprisingly conventional set of mild, introspective pop with a few dance-oriented elements". They added, "Some alternative and college outlets may pick up on Bertei via past associations, but legs on this one appear short." In his list of the "lost albums of the '80s", Ernest Hardy of Cash Box stated that Bertei's "quirks and sly observations, while at times very cute, were wrapped in trappings that were seemingly too pop for many too see the heart and intelligence underneath". He concluded that it was "not a revolutionary work", but was a "real gem just the same" and "should have been a hit". Ira Robbins of Trouser Press commented that Bertei had made a "surprisingly accessible and enjoyable solo debut", with a "warm platter of engagingly substantial dance music, adult rock and jazzy soul-pop".

== Track listing ==
All tracks are written by Adele Bertei and Ian Prince except where noted.

No.	Title	Writer(s)	Length
1.	"Little Lives, Big Love"		4:11
2.	"The Green Suit"	Bertei, Tony Mansfield	4:36
3.	"Truth and Lies"		3:05
4.	"Babes in Moneyland"	Bertei, Paul Gurvitz	4:00
5.	"The Loneliest Girl (Pentimento)"	Bertei, Judy Nylon	4:36
6.	"Can't Stop the Dance"		4:37
7.	"Golden Square"		3:50
8.	"Fool for Love"	Bertei, Scott Cutler, Jeff Hull	3:54
9.	"Hollywood"	Bertei, Carbonell	3:42
10.	"Love This Way"		4:11

== Personnel ==
- Adele Bertei – lead vocals (1–10), drum programming (2), backing vocals (3, 4, 7–9)
- Ian Prince – keyboards (1, 3–5, 7, 9, 10), drum programming (1, 3–7, 9, 10), backing vocals (1, 7), additional keyboards (6), percussion (9)
- Bashiri Johnson – additional percussion (1)
- Jocelyn Brown – backing vocals (1)
- Connie Hayes – backing vocals (1)
- Benny Diggs – backing vocals (1)
- Gary Spaniola – guitar (2, 6, 7), drum programming (2), additional drums (7)
- Luis Resto – keyboards (2, 6), additional keyboards (7)
- Marcia Stokes – backing vocals (2, 6)
- Tonya Yarbrough – backing vocals (2, 6)
- Rick Bell – saxophone solo (3), saxophone (4)
- Bitti Strauchn – backing vocals (3, 5)
- Ira Siegel – guitar (5, 9)
- Sandra St. Victor – backing vocals (5)
- Jeff Hall – keyboards (8), additional drum programming (8)
- Michael Reid – guitar (8)
- Rick Derringer – guitar (8)
- Billy Schlosser – drum programming (8)
- Alan Smallwood – trumpet (9)
- David Darling – guitar (10)
- John Kip – oboe, flute (10)
- Elisa Fiorillo – backing vocals (10)
- Bobby White – Japanese translation and voice (10)

Production

- Adele Bertei – production (1, 3–5, 9, 10), co-production (2, 6, 7), mixing (9)
- Ian Prince – production (1, 3–5, 9, 10), mixing (9)
- Gary Spaniola – production (2, 6, 7), mixing (2), engineering (2, 6, 7)
- Gary Katz – production (8)
- Shelly Yakus – mixing (1, 3–8)
- Marc DeSisto – mixing (1, 3–8)
- François Kevorkian – mixing (10)
- Dave Dale – engineering (1, 3–5, 9)
- Steven Selzer – engineering assistance (1, 3, 9)
- Shauna Stobie – engineering assistance (1, 3–5, 9)
- Steve Gursky – engineering (7)
- Art Munson – engineering (8)
- Chris Brosius – engineering (10)
- David Schwartz – engineering (10)
- George Marino – mastering

Other

- David LaChapelle – photography
- Joshua Jordan – stylist
- Vivid ID – sleeve design and photography
