= Europa and the Pirate Twins =

- 1981 UK 12-inch edition by EMI

Single by Thomas Dolby

from the album The Golden Age of Wireless
- B-side: "Therapy / Growth"
- Released: 14 September 1981
- Genre: New wave; synth-pop
- Length: 3:19
- Label: Venice in Peril; EMI
- Songwriter: Thomas Dolby
- Producers: Thomas Dolby, Tim Friese-Greene

Thomas Dolby singles chronology
| "Urges" / "Leipzig" (1981) | "Europa and the Pirate Twins" (1981) | "Airwaves" (1982) |

"Europa and the Pirate Twins" is a song by the English musician Thomas Dolby, from his debut studio album The Golden Age of Wireless (1982). Written by Dolby, who produced it alongside Tim Friese-Greene, the song was released as a single on 14 September 1981.

The song, described as a "synth pop classic", was inspired by the atmosphere of World War II, and features a guest appearance by XTC's Andy Partridge. The single reached a peak position of 48 in the United Kingdom, Dolby's home country, as well as charting in the United States and Canada.

== Composition ==
Taken from the album The Golden Age of Wireless, "Europa and the Pirate Twins" was written by Thomas Dolby, who produced it in collaboration with Tim Friese-Greene. The song opens with a "bluesy" harmonica solo, performed by Andy Partridge of the band XTC. The song makes use of electronic drums, and features a "high-register" synthesiser line throughout. The song's main musical hook is a "Bo Diddley beat", a repetitive rhythm common in several musical genres.

Joseph Stannard of Drowned in Sound has noted that "Europa and the Pirate Twins" is written with World War II as a strong influence, and that the song "emphasises the short distance between [Dolby's] generation and the one which endured the last global conflict". Dolby has described the song, along with the tone of the album, as reflecting "a sense of [a] relationship that's going on as being overwhelmed by something on a grander level", adding that "there's a very strong wartime atmosphere to it". The song was described as "a semi-autobiographical romp" in the liner notes for Dolby's 2009 greatest hits album The Singular Thomas Dolby, the release of which was overseen by the singer. "Europa and the Pirate Twins" received a "sequel" on Dolby's 1992 album Astronauts & Heretics, in the song "Eastern Bloc"; which has been described by Audio magazine as "appealingly faithful" to the original.

== Release ==
"Europa and the Pirate Twins" was released as a single in the United Kingdom on 14 September 1981. It was Dolby's first major label release, taken from his EMI-released début album The Golden Age of Wireless. The song spent three weeks in the UK Singles Chart, reaching a peak position of 48. The song first appeared in RPM magazine's Canadian singles chart on 18 June 1983, debuting at number 50. It eventually reached a peak position of 45 in that chart. The song debuted in the United States' Billboard Hot 100 singles chart on 2 July 1983, spending five weeks there and peaking at number 67. It also reached a peak position of 37 on the Billboard rock chart in 1982.

The song's release was accompanied by a music video, blending together several elements of footage. These included footage of the Ziegfeld Follies, Dolby interacting with a futuristic "telecomputer", and black-and-white shots of Dolby and a shrouded female figure by the coast. The video was written and directed by Dolby.

| Chart | Peak position |
|---|---|
| Canadian Singles Chart | 45 |
| UK Singles Chart | 48 |
| US Billboard Hot 100 | 67 |
| US Top Rock Tracks | 37 |

== Reception ==
"Europa and the Pirate Twins" was described by Peter Buckley, in his book The Rough Guide to Rock, as "showcas[ing] Dolby's trademark combination of the charming and the gimmicky". Writing for Allrovi, Stewart Mason described the song as "a hyperactive synth pop classic", whose "every nook and cranny is stuffed with some sort of ear-grabbing hook". Mason added that the song "pack[s] a remarkable amount of detail into two short verses and a bridge" and "resolves with a soaring, bittersweet chorus". Cashbox said that the song "quickens the electronic pace in a tale of an irretrievable childhood sweetheart". They also highlighted the "mournful" harmonica playing of Andy Partridge.

Writing about the song's music video, Dennis Shin of PopMatters described Dolby as being on the "leading edge" in the medium, highlighting the videos for "She Blinded Me with Science" and "Hyperactive!" in addition to describing that for "Europa and the Pirate Twins" as being "one of his lesser-known and unsung videos".

== Cover versions ==
A cover version of the song featuring lyrics in Swedish is the title track on the band Noice's 1982 synth pop album Europa. Norwegian singer Sondre Lerche also covered the song as a bonus track included with his 2007 album Phantom Punch.
