= Close but No Cigar (Thomas Dolby song) =

1992 single by Thomas Dolby

Single by Thomas Dolby

from the album Astronauts & Heretics
- B-side: "Neon Sisters"
- Released: 27 April 1992
- Length: 4:26 (album version); 4:05 (single version)
- Label: Virgin
- Songwriter: Thomas Dolby
- Producer: Thomas Dolby

Thomas Dolby singles chronology
"My Brain Is Like a Sieve" (1989)	"Close but No Cigar" (1992)	"I Love You Goodbye" (1992)

Audio
- "Close but No Cigar" on YouTube

"Close but No Cigar" is a song by English singer and musician Thomas Dolby, released by Virgin Records on 27 April 1992 as the lead single from his fourth studio album, Astronauts & Heretics (1992). The song, which was written and produced by Dolby, reached number 22 on the UK singles chart.

== Background ==
"Close but No Cigar" is an autobiographical song that Dolby was inspired to write based on a past relationship. The young woman originally cast Dolby aside, but later admitted that she had made a mistake when they met up again later in life.

The song features Eddie Van Halen on guitar. Dolby met Van Halen through their respective wives as both were actresses and knew one another. In a 2017 interview with Ultimate Classic Rock, Dolby recalled, "I'd hung out with Eddie a few times socially, and we'd sort of discussed it [working on Dolby's new album]. I definitely had him in mind for the guitar work on 'Close but No Cigar' and the solo on 'Eastern Bloc'."

== Music video ==
The song's accompanying music video was directed by Michel Gondry.

== Critical reception ==
Upon its release as a single, pan-European magazine Music & Media wrote, "Supported by a chopping guitar riff by Eddie Van Halen, 'Close but No Cigar' is a strange hybrid of radio-friendly tunes and idiosyncratic arrangements." They added that it was a "great return to form by a man who scored such illustrious hits as 'I Scare Myself' and 'Hyperactive'".

== Track listings ==
7–inch and cassette single (UK and Europe)

1. "Close But No Cigar" – 4:05
2. "Neon Sisters" – 4:52

CD limited edition single #1 (UK and Europe)

1. "Close But No Cigar" – 4:05
2. "Beauty of a Dream" (Piano & Vocal) – 5:05
3. "Close But No Cigar" (version) – 4:21
4. "Neon Sisters" – 4:52

CD limited edition single #2 (UK and Europe)

1. "Close But No Cigar" – 4:05
2. "Hyperactive" – 4:14
3. "She Blinded Me with Science" – 3:40
4. "I Scare Myself" – 5:37

Cassette and CD E.P. (Australasia)

1. "Close But No Cigar" – 4:05
2. "Hyperactive" – 4:14
3. "She Blinded Me with Science" – 3:40
4. "I Scare Myself" – 5:37

== Personnel ==
"Close but No Cigar"

- Thomas Dolby – vocals, keyboards
- Eddie Van Halen – rhythm guitar
- Larry Treadwell – guitar
- Matthew Seligman – bass
- Jill Colucci – backing vocals
- Mike Kapitan – commentator

Production

- Thomas Dolby – production (all tracks)
- Tim Friese-Greene – production ("She Blinded Me with Science")

Other

- Larry Vigon – art direction, design
- Brian Jackson – design
- Vladimir Paperny – illustration

== Charts ==
Chart (1992)	Peak position
Australia (ARIA)	107
Eurochart Hot 100 Singles	78
Germany (GfK)	88
New Zealand (Recorded Music NZ)	14
UK Singles (OCC)	22
UK Top 50 Airplay (Music Week)	37
