= Adele Bertei =

American singer, songwriter, writer, actor and director

- Born: 1955 (age 70–71); Cleveland, Ohio, US
- Occupations: Singer; songwriter; writer; actor; director
- Years active: 1977–present
- Website: adelebertei.com

Adele Maria Bertei (born 1955) is an American singer, songwriter, writer, actor, and film director.

== Early life ==
Bertei was born in Cleveland, Ohio in 1955. She is the eldest of three children born to Katherine (née Murphy) and Umberto Bertei. Her father was an Italian immigrant and her mother was of Irish and French Canadian descent. Bertei and her brothers became wards of the state of Ohio, resulting in a childhood spent in foster homes, a Catholic convent school for wayward girls, and a reformatory in Ohio. Bertei never completed a formal education and is an autodidact.

She began writing poetry at a very young age and was discovered as a singer by Cleveland musician Peter Laughner, who mentored her and convinced her to pursue a career in music.

== Career in music ==
Bertei began her career playing guitar and singing in the Wolves, her first band with Laughner. She left Cleveland for New York City in 1977 shortly after Laughner died prematurely of complications due to alcoholism.

Bertei quickly became a prominent figure in the no wave art and music scene in NYC, playing Ace Tone organ and electric guitar in the original line up of the Contortions fronted by James Chance. While working as personal assistant to Brian Eno in 1978, Bertei took him to a series of concerts at Artists Space in New York, which resulted in Eno producing the iconoclastic LP No New York for the Virgin/Antilles label, featuring the Contortions and three other no wave bands.

The artist Martin Kippenberger brought Bertei to Berlin in 1980 to perform solo at his SO36 club and upon her return to the U.S., Bertei started the all-girl punk-funk band The Bloods with guitarist Kathy Rey. The Bloods are considered the first rock and roll band of gay women who were publicly out of the closet. The band toured internationally, opened for the Clash in New York and released the single "Button Up," a John Peel favorite on the Au Pairs' label Exit Records in 1981. "Button Up" was re-released on the British label Soul Jazz Records as part of the compilation New York Noise, Volume 1, released in 2005.

After The Bloods disbanded, Bertei worked as a DJ in Amsterdam, and upon returning to New York was one of the first solo acts to be signed to Geffen Records in 1981. Thomas Dolby produced her first hit dance single "Build Me a Bridge," and the success of the single led to an album deal with Geffen, but the company had alienated Dolby. Says Bertei of this period in the early 1980s: "Back then, female performers couldn't be too wild, and certainly not outspokenly gay, even a little. Defying the rules had its consequences. This was exacerbated by the horrid reputation I had in the 1980s, some of it hyperbole but not all of it completely unfounded. Half-Piaf, half-Hemingway… singing and brawling. Wrestling in public with quite a few demons that I should have dragged to a therapist."

Dolby invited her to sing backing vocals on his next LP, The Flat Earth. Bertei sang a duet with him on the single "Hyperactive!" which became an international pop hit for Dolby. She performed the song live on the Old Grey Whistle Test in 1984. During her years in London, Bertei sang backing vocals with various groups live and in the studio, including Culture Club and The Passions. She has written songs for artists as varied as The Pointer Sisters, Sheena Easton, Thomas Dolby, Arthur Baker, Jellybean Benitez, The Anubian Lights, Lydia Lunch and Matthew Sweet.

Bertei signed with Chrysalis Records in 1985 and recorded the song "When It's Over", produced by David Gamson and Fred Maher of Scritti Politti and John Potoker, with Green Gartside providing guest vocals. The concept for the music video was a performance in a women's prison. During this period she joined Jellybean Benitez for his LP Just Visiting This Planet, co-writing several songs and singing lead on the international pop hit "Just a Mirage" in 1988. She performed the song with Jellybean on the UK's Top of the Pops that year. Her debut solo album, Little Lives, was released in 1988 and included the anti-apartheid anthem "Little Lives, Big Love".

Bertei continued to work as a backing vocalist, most notably for Tears for Fears' Sowing the Seeds of Love tour in 1990 where she also sang backing vocals for the opening act, Blondie's Deborah Harry. After a brief stint touring with Sophie B. Hawkins as a backing singer, she moved to Los Angeles in 1993 and took a long hiatus from music to write and study directing. Since then her only musical outing has been with The Anubian Lights as lead singer in 2005 and Phantascope, a CD of co-produced and co-written songs on Nona Hendryx's label Rhythmbank.

== Directing and film ==
Striking a punk-waif look and attitude, Bertei was heavily involved in the underground film scene of the time, collaborating and appearing in No Wave films by the Irish filmmaker Vivienne Dick, Scott and Beth B, and in the feminist sci-fi film Born in Flames, directed by Lizzie Borden.

In the 1990s, Bertei directed several period pieces for the Showtime series Women: Stories of Passion, and a soft-core comedy feature for Playboy, Secrets of a Chambermaid, which she directed in super-16 mm with an ensemble cast (featuring Mary Woronov of Warhol/Chelsea Girls fame) and a minuscule budget in seven days. Bertei directed a 35 mm teaser for her original screenplay The Ballad of Johnny Jane.

== Writing ==
Bertei has been awarded a writing fellowship at the Albert and Elaine Borchard Foundation fellowship for the Tomales Bay Workshops, specifically to work with Dorothy Allison in 2010.

Bertei has worked as a U.S. contributing editor-at-large for the Caribbean arts and culture magazine 6 Carlos. Bertei launched a website in 2011 and based on writing featured there, has been approached to pen her memoirs. She also blogs for the Huffington Post.

Bertei has written four books. Published in 2013, Bertei’s first book is Peter and the Wolves about her friendship with musician Peter Laughner and their journey through the 1970’s underground punk scene. The book was rereleased in 2021. Bertei’s second book, Why Labelle Matters, is about the cultural and musical progress achieved by Patti LaBelle and the Blue Belles in the 1960’s. Her memoir titled Twist: Tales of a Queer Girlhood was published in March 2023 by ZE Books. In February 2025, her book examining Sinead O'Connor's album Universal Mother was published by Bloomsbury in the 33 1/3 RPM series.

Her newest book, No New York: A Memoir of No Wave and the Women Who Shaped the Scene, was released in early 2026 by Beacon Press in the US and Faber & Faber in the UK.
