= Jazz Mafia =

The Jazz Mafia is a young American musical collective led by Adam Theis and performs music rooted in jazz but touching on other genres and featuring a variety of sub-groupings with various collaborators.

The collective is based in the Mission District of San Francisco, California where it writes, plays, and arranges jazz music while incorporating genres such as electronica, soul, funk, big band, symphonic, and hip-hop. Its founder and leader, trombonist and bass guitarist Adam Theis, participates in at least ten bands, including Realistic Orchestra, Shotgun Wedding Quintet, Shotgun Wedding Hip-Hop Symphony, Jazz Mafia Horns, Supertaster, and the Joe Bagale Band.

== Adam Theis and history ==
Adam Theis grew up in Santa Rosa, California and Sebastopol, California. Theis came from a non musical family, yet he began playing trombone in fourth grade after his neighbor introduced him to the instrument. His music teacher Ken Winett turned him on to different genres including jazz, gospel, and Jamaican pre-reggae rhythms. Theis’ passion for jazz changed his junior year of high school. At the time Theis was in a garage band. One day the band was locked out of their practice room and were left with only horn instruments, so they decided to play their band's songs on the horns. That moment changed his perception of Jazz music.

Theis studied jazz composition at Sonoma State University. His professional career started when he met a member of Grand Junction. They asked Theis and his friend to play for their horn section, becoming valuable members to the group and other groups who needed stable and available horn players. In 1998, Theis moved to San Francisco’s Mission District and founded the San Francisco Jazz Mafia which now consists of The Shotgun Wedding Quintet, The Jazz Mafia Symphony, Realistic Orchestra and many more. The first official group under the umbrella of Jazz Mafia, Realistic, started when various jazz forces in the Bay Area started to collaborate and jam together. Before organizing the various groups under the Jazz Mafia title, Theis participated in a number of Bay Area bands including Cannonball, named after Cannonball Adderley. The horn section of the Jazz Mafia started becoming known for backing up such artists as Carlos Santana, Spearhead, KRS-One, Zion I, and Thomas Dolby.

Theis is the center of Jazz Mafia, playing multiple roles. He is a bassist/trombonist for Jazz Mafia affiliate Shotgun Wedding Quintet which he co-leads with the other four members of the quintet, he is the conductor and chief arranger of the 50 piece Jazz Mafia Symphony and leads his own classical/crossover string quartet. He also schedules rehearsals, hustles gigs, and does publicity. One of Theis’ goals was to create a group that centers on the concept of community. Theis knows market for finding gigs is tough, but wants to disband some of the cliquishness of the jazz scene. In 2008, Theis was awarded the prestigious Gerbode-Hewlett Foundation “Emerging Composers” Grant. With the grant secured, Theis was able to schedule The event at the Palace of Fine arts presented by SF Jazz, on April 18, 2009. Theis composed all new music for a one-hour concert featuring a 50 piece version of musicians from the Jazz Mafia.

== Members and collaborators ==
The Jazz Mafia has also collaborated with hip-hop artists DJ Qbert, Zion I, The Grouch, Ledesi, Chief Xcel, Lateef The Truthspeaker, Baby Jaymes, Kid Koala, DJ Logic, EPMD, Digital Underground and Shock G, Lyrics Born and J Boogie, singers Beck, Spearhead, Eric Lindell and Thomas Dolby, guitarist Will Bernard

Regular members have included sax/keys player Joe Cohen, vocalist Dublin, drummers Eric Garland and Pat Korte, singers Joe Bagale and Crystal monee Hall and MC's Seneca, Dublin. Aima The Dreamer, Soulati and Infinite

== Sound ==
The various groups' sound has been compared with David Axelrod. One writer compared the approach to "what you'd hear if a full-size philharmonic found itself jamming with a classic big band during a street-corner rap battle", and another to Cab Calloway and his orchestra.

== Notable events and compositions ==
In 2007 the Jazz Mafia Horns went on a nationwide tour with 1980s new wave musician Thomas Dolby. Their performance that year at the South by Southwest conference in Austin, Texas became the basis of a joint album, and was part of the 2000-decade revival of Dolby's live performance career.

In 2008, Theis was commissioned by SFJAZZ (a local jazz organization), under a grant from the Wallace Alexander Gerbode and the William and Flora Hewlett Foundations, to write a symphonic work that would be accessible to a diverse audience. The result, Brass, Bows, and Beats, is an hour-long piece for large brass band, string section, orchestra, turntablist, singers, rappers, and keyboardist. The premier, featuring a 60-piece orchestra at San Francisco's Palace of Fine Arts, was sold out and received "ecstatic" reviews. The success of the first performance encouraged the group to continue performing, including 3 sold out performances in August, 2009 at Yoshi's, a large San Francisco Jazz club.

In 2009, the Jazz Mafia played a sold-out tribute to Michael Jackson, also at Yoshi's. The collective has had regular residencies at San Francisco clubs, including Bruno's and Black Cat (both no longer jazz clubs), Coda (where they and bassist Marcus Shelby played opening night)and Yoshi's.

The Jazz Mafia Symphony continued in 2010, performing the "Brass Bows and Beats" symphony at the Playboy, Montreal, Monterey, and Newport Jazz fests- to enthusiastic audiences. In 2011 the ensemble premiered parts of a new work, the "Emperor Norton Suite" (inspired by the life of the eccentric "mascot" of San Francisco during the late 19th century- "Emperor Norton") at the Folsom Three Stages arts center near Sacramento, followed by the full world premier of this work at the Stern Grove festival in June, 2011.
