= Nick Sinclair =

British photographer (born 1963)

Nick Sinclair (born 1963) is a British photographer. The National Portrait Gallery in London holds 148 of his portrait photographs.

After graduating from West Surrey College of Art and Design in 1986, Sinclair moved to Amsterdam, where he lived for three years. He spent a year, working on The Stage project with a portable studio, on a project commissioned for the Gemeente Archief Amsterdam. In 1987 he was commissioned by the Rijksmuseum Amsterdam to photographed people involved in Amsterdam's art world. In 1989, Sinclair moved to London. In 1990 "The Stage", together with six portraits of peers were exhibited at The Photographers' Gallery, in London. In 1990 he started work on the Parliamentarians project from which came the first of his photographs to be acquired by the National Portrait Gallery. The project, together with a series of photographs of scientists commissioned by Cable and Wireless was exhibitted and toured by the NPG in 1994. In 1998 the NPG exhibitted a series of portraits of senior doctors, commissioned and published by the British Medical Journal, as "With Head & Hand & Heart". Sinclair has completed several other photography projects, including images of student life at Green College, Oxford (1998) and "Scooterlands" 1999, photographs of classic scooters in Italy and India.

For the next few years Sinclair's focus was commercial, for a wide variety of editorial and corporate clients. However, most recently, He has returned to more personal projects and has been producing work focused on our responses to a changing environment. In 2007, he was awarded a Winston Churchill Memorial Trust Travel Fellowship to visit China and photograph street level recycling in seven Chinese cities. In 2008, the Winchester Gallery, at the Winchester School of Art, exhibited three projects under the title, "Water, Ice, Vapour". One of these projects, "A Drop in the Ocean", photographs of plastic water bottles adrift in the North Sea, was nominated for the international sustainable photography prize, Prix Pictet.

Sinclair lives on the Suffolk coast.
