= Airwaves (Thomas Dolby song) =

1982 single by Thomas Dolby

Single by Thomas Dolby

from the album The Golden Age of Wireless
- B-side: "The Wreck of the Fairchild"
- Released: 25 January 1982
- Genre: New wave; synth-pop
- Length: 5:17 (album version); 3:38 (single version)
- Label: Venice in Peril; EMI
- Songwriter: Thomas Dolby
- Producer: Thomas Dolby

Thomas Dolby singles chronology
"Europa and the Pirate Twins" (1981)	"Airwaves" (1982)	"Radio Silence" (1982)

Music video
- "Airwaves" on YouTube

"Airwaves" is a song by English singer and musician Thomas Dolby, released by Venice in Peril Records/EMI Records on 25 January 1982 as the second single from his debut studio album, The Golden Age of Wireless (1982). The song, which was written and produced by Dolby, reached number 130 on the Record Business Bubbling Under Singles chart.

== Writing ==
In a 2013 interview with The Huffington Post, Dolby described the idea behind the lyrics of "Airwaves": "You can imagine this sort of post-apocalyptic world, where it's very dangerous to go out in the subways, and everything's electrified, and the air is not safe, and so on. And there's a sort of underground ham radio movement. I tend to sort of, you know – my tribe are really the underdogs, the resistance – that's my tribe."

== Recording ==
"Airwaves" was recorded at Tapestry Studios, London, in September 1981 and was mixed at Playground Studio, London, in December 1981.

== Release ==
"Airwaves" first surfaced as a demo recording on the various artists compilation album From Brussels with Love, released on 20 November 1980 by the Belgian label Les Disques du Crépuscule. The 1981 recording of "Airwaves" was released as a single in the UK on 25 January 1982, preceding the release of its parent album, The Golden Age of Wireless, by four months. It was released through Dolby's own label, Venice in Peril Records, with marketing and distribution by EMI Records. Although Dolby's previous single, "Europa and the Pirate Twins", cracked the top 50 of the UK singles chart, "Airwaves" failed to enter the top 75. It did, however, reach number 130 on Record Business magazine's Bubbling Under Singles chart.

== Critical reception ==
Upon its release as a single, Sunie of Record Mirror predicted "Airwaves" would be a hit. She summarised, "Ridiculously commercial blend of OMD electronics and American AOR-style vocals on a slow, tuneful song that should appeal to Godley & Creme fans everywhere." Red Starr of Smash Hits praised the "catchy ballad" for its "arresting imagery" and noted the "strong, atmospheric performance", but added it was a "curious choice as a single given the odd subject matter". Paul Nettleton, writing for the Evening News and Star, noted that it was "not quite the epic that 'Vienna' was for Ultravox, but [it] impresses a great deal". Lenny Juviski of The Northern Echo called it "charmed pop nonsense". Robbi Millar of Sounds was negative in her review, stating, "I hear nothing very special herein, nothing that I couldn't hear on Station to Station and certainly nothing to justify EMI's financial delight in him."

== Track listing ==
7–inch single (UK, South Africa and Australia)

1. "Airwaves" – 3:38
2. "The Wreck of the Fairchild" – 3:09

== Personnel ==
"Airwaves"

- Thomas Dolby – lead vocals, backing vocals, synthesiser, piano
- Kevin Armstrong – guitar
- Mark Heyward-Chaplin – bass guitar
- Justin Hildreth – drums
- Bruce Woolley – backing vocals

Production

- Thomas Dolby – production

Other

- Andrew Douglas – photography

== Charts ==
Chart (1982)	Peak position
UK Bubbling Under Singles 101–150 (Record Business)	130
