= Airhead (song) =

1988 single by Thomas Dolby

Single by Thomas Dolby

from the album Aliens Ate My Buick
- B-side: "Budapest By Blimp"
- Released: 28 March 1988
- Length: 5:07 (album version); 3:38 (edited version)
- Label: EMI Manhattan
- Songwriters: Thomas Dolby; Grant Morris
- Producers: Thomas Dolby; Bill Bottrell

Thomas Dolby singles chronology
"Howard the Duck" (1986)	"Airhead" (1988)	"Hot Sauce" (1989)

Music video
- "Airhead" on YouTube

"Airhead" is a song by the English singer and musician Thomas Dolby, released by EMI Manhattan Records on 28 March 1988 as the lead single from his third album, Aliens Ate My Buick (1988). The song was written by Dolby and Grant Morris, and was produced by Dolby and Bill Bottrell. It reached number 53 on the UK singles chart and number 6 on the US Billboard Hot Dance Music Club Play chart.

== Background ==
Dolby was inspired to write "Airhead" about on a woman he knew in real life. He told the Associated Press in 1988, "The song is about one specific female from first-hand experience. The big crime is that the lady behaves like an airhead even though she has a brain."

== Release ==
"Airhead" was released in the UK on 7-inch and 12-inch vinyl on 28 March 1988. The CD format of the single was released on 4 April 1988. For its release as a single, remixes of the song were created by Rusty Garner, and François Kevorkian and Goh Hotoda.

== Music video ==
The song's accompanying music video was directed by Drew Takahashi. The concept for the video came from Dolby himself. He revealed to Billboard in 1988, "All I had to do was explain the concept to one guy at the label, and he wrote me a check for $110,000." In the US, the video achieved heavy rotation on MTV after being given Buzz Bin status. It won the award for best storyline at the 1988 IMMC (International Music & Media Conference) Music Video Awards and was nominated at the Billboard Video Music Awards under the "most experimental" category.

== Critical reception ==
Upon its release as a single in the UK, Frank Gillespie of Number One picked "Airhead" as the magazine's "single of the week" and awarded it a full five star rating. Betty Page of Record Mirror also picked it as one of the magazine's "singles of the week", calling the "chunky, funky, confident and brash" song an "entertaining tune about Californian bimbos, sort of 10cc meets Parliament". Jerry Smith of Music Week stated, "The eccentric, mad professor image might have gone but Thomas Dolby returns with a typically wacky, jerkily funky little number that is so catchy as to be assured blanket coverage on every available medium." Tom Doyle of Smash Hits felt that it was "not one of his better warblings", but said it is "still a clever effort". Pan-European magazine Music & Media called it a "welcome return" for Dolby, which "continue[s] his quirky, funk-based approach [to] produce a lively chart-bound and likeably eccentric number". In the US, Billboard noted that Dolby returns with a "sharp tongue and a wicked groove".

== Track listings ==
7–inch single (UK, Europe, North America and Australasia) and cassette single (US)

1. "Airhead" (edit) – 3:38
2. "Budapest By Blimp" (edit) – 5:01

7–inch single (South Africa)

1. "Airhead" – 5:05
2. "Budapest By Blimp" (edit) – 5:02

12–inch single (UK, Europe and Australia)

1. "Airhead" (extended version) – 6:40
2. "Airhead" (Dub Part I) – 5:12
3. "Airhead" (Dub Part II) – 3:43
4. "Budapest By Blimp" (7" edit) – 5:01

12–inch single (US and Canada)

1. "Airhead" (extended version) (Francois' Mix/Francois' Dub) – 10:45
2. "Airhead" (Rusty Mix) – 7:22
3. "Airhead" (Rusty Dub) – 5:29
4. "Budapest By Blimp" (edit) – 5:07

12–inch single "Airheads' Revenge" (US)

1. "Airheads' Revenge" – 8:19
2. "Revenge Rap" – 3:29
3. "Airhead" (Def Ears Mix) – 5:48
4. "Airhead" (Rusty's Mix) – 7:18

CD single (UK)

1. "Airhead" (7" edit) – 3:42
2. "Budapest By Blimp" – 5:03
3. "Hyperactive!" (7" version) – 4:12
4. "Airhead" (extended version) – 6:38

CD single (Japan)

1. "Airhead" (extended version) – 6:42
2. "Budapest By Blimp" (7" edit) – 5:02

CD promotional single (US)

1. "Airhead" (7" edit) – 3:38
2. "Airhead" (Dance Mix) – 7:15
3. "Airhead" (Dance Edit) – 3:49

== Personnel ==
"Airhead"

- Thomas Dolby – vocals, keyboards
- Larry Treadwell – guitar
- Mike Kapitan – synthesizer
- Terry Jackson – bass
- David Owens – drums
- Laura Creamer – vocals, percussion
- Bruce Woolley – backing vocals
- Colin Crabtree – backing vocals

Production

- Thomas Dolby – production ("Airhead", "Budapest By Blimp", "Hyperactive!"), editing ("Budapest By Blimp")
- Bill Bottrell – production and engineering ("Airhead", "Budapest By Blimp")
- François Kevorkian – remix and additional production ("Extended Version", "Dub Part I", "Dub Part II")
- Goh Hotoda – remix and additional production ("Extended Version", "Dub Part I", "Dub Part II")
- Bill Esses – remix and production assistance ("Extended Version", "Dub Part I", "Dub Part II")
- Rusty Garner – remix, production assistance and editing ("Rusty Mix", "Rusty Dub", "Airheads' Revenge", "Revenge Rap", "Def Ears Mix")
- Charlie Paakkari – remix engineering ("Rusty Mix", "Rusty Dub")
- Brad Buxer – additional keyboards ("Rusty Mix", "Rusty Dub")
- Benji Candelario – editing ("Rusty Dub")
- Latoya Hanson – vocals ("Airheads' Revenge", "Revenge Rap")
- Nicole Milligan – vocals ("Airheads' Revenge", "Revenge Rap")
- Bob "Bassy" Brockmann – additional recording and mixing ("Airheads' Revenge", "Revenge Rap", "Def Ears Mix")
- Rob Gordon – editing ("Airheads' Revenge", "Revenge Rap", "Def Ears Mix")
- Herb Powers – mastering

== Charts ==
Chart (1988)	Peak position
Australia (ARIA)	69
Italy Airplay (Music & Media)	16
UK Singles (Official Charts)	53
US Hot Dance Music Club Play (Billboard)	6
