= Astronauts & Heretics =

Album by Thomas Dolby

Studio album by Thomas Dolby
- Released: 27 July 1992
- Genre: New wave; zydeco
- Length: 43:16
- Label: Virgin (UK); Giant (US)
- Producer: Thomas Dolby

Thomas Dolby chronology
Aliens Ate My Buick (1988)	Astronauts & Heretics (1992)	A Map of the Floating City (2011)

Singles from Astronauts & Heretics
- 1. "Close but No Cigar" Released: 27 April 1992; 2. "I Love You Goodbye" Released: 29 June 1992; 3. "Silk Pyjamas" Released: 14 September 1992

Professional ratings
Review scores
Source	Rating
AllMusic	3/5 stars
Billboard	positive
Entertainment Weekly	A−
NME	5/10

Astronauts & Heretics is the fourth studio album by English new wave/synth-pop musician Thomas Dolby, released on 27 July 1992. It was Dolby's last studio album until 2011's A Map of the Floating City and his last album to be released as a vinyl LP.

The album was met with some success in the UK. However, according to Dolby, the album went largely unnoticed in the US due to poor distribution by Giant Records and the popularity of grunge at the time.

After asking Dolby for help with his studio equipment, Eddie Van Halen agreed to play guitar on two songs on the album: "Eastern Bloc" and "Close but No Cigar", including a Van Halen-style solo on the former.

There were also several other guests including drummer Budgie of Siouxsie and the Banshees.

The music video for "Silk Pyjamas" was filmed on location in Cuba.

== Track listing ==
All tracks are written by Thomas Dolby, except where noted.

No.	Title	Writer(s)	Length
1.	"I Love You Goodbye"		5:58
2.	"Cruel"		3:08
3.	"Silk Pyjamas"		3:38
4.	"I Live in a Suitcase"		5:29
5.	"Eastern Bloc ("Europa and the Pirate Twins Part II")"		5:19
6.	"Close but No Cigar"		4:27
7.	"That's Why People Fall in Love"		5:28
8.	"Neon Sisters"	Thomas Dolby, Matthew Seligman	4:54
9.	"Beauty of a Dream"		5:04
Total length:			43:16

== Personnel ==
Musicians

- Thomas Dolby – vocals, piano (tracks 1, 3, 4, 9), keyboards (tracks 1, 2, 5–7), organ (tracks 3, 8), rhythm guitar (track 4), programs (track 4), synthesizer (track 8)
- Wayne Toups – Cajun accordion (track 1), background vocals (track 1)
- Michael Doucet – Cajun fiddle (tracks 1, 3), background vocals (track 1)
- Al Tharp – Cajun banjo (track 1), background vocals (track 1)
- Terry Jackson – bass guitar (tracks 1, 4, 7)
- Larry Treadwell – guitar (tracks 1, 3, 4, 6, 8), rhythm guitar (track 5), slide guitar (track 5)
- Suzanne Malline – background vocals (track 1)
- Cynthia Moliere – background vocals (track 1)
- Teresita Alsander – background vocals (track 1)
- Eddi Reader – guest vocal (track 2)
- Matthew Seligman – fretless bass (track 2), bass (tracks 3, 5, 6, 8)
- Jimmy Breaux – Cajun accordion (track 3)
- Mr. Pits – background vocals (tracks 3, 5)
- Loz Netto – background vocals (tracks 3, 5)
- Marcus Wallis – background vocals (tracks 3, 5)
- Laura Creamer – background vocals (tracks 3, 5)
- Jon E. Love – lead guitar (track 4)
- Eddie Van Halen – lead guitar (track 5), guitar (track 6)
- Jill Colucci – background vocals (track 6)
- Mike Kapitan – commentator (track 6), additional programming (track 7)
- Ofra Haza – guest vocal (track 7)
- Tommy Gutman Sanchez – guitar (track 7)
- Jimmy Z – sax (track 7)
- Rafael Padilla – percussion (track 7)
- Budgie – drums (track 8)
- David Owens – drums (tracks 8, 9)
- Jon Klein – guitar (track 8)
- Leland Sklar – bass (track 9)
- Jerry Garcia – lead guitar (track 9)
- Bob Weir – rhythm guitar (track 9)

Technical

- Thomas Dolby – producer, engineer
- Jay Baumgardner – mixing (track 8), assistant engineer
- Paul Gomarsall – engineer (track 8)
- Charles Paakkari – engineer (track 8)
- Larry Vigon – art director, design
- Brian Jackson – design
- Joyce Tenneson – photography
- Mary Coller – executive producer
- Greg Marchant – assistant engineer
- Phil Reynolds – assistant engineer
- Steve Himelfarb – assistant engineer
- Doug Michael – assistant engineer
- Elaine Anderson – assistant engineer
- Squeak Stone – assistant engineer
- Chuck Fedko – assistant engineer
- Robert Read – assistant engineer
- John Cutler – assistant engineer

== Charts ==
Chart (1992)	Peak position
Australian Albums (ARIA)	123
UK Albums (OCC)	35
US New Rock Albums (Radio & Records)	7
