= The Golden Age of Wireless =

Studio album by Thomas Dolby
- Released: 10 May 1982
- Recorded: September 1981 – January 1982 (original release); September 1981 – August 1982 (reissue)
- Studios: Tapestry (London); Advision (London); Aosis (London); Marcus Music (London); Odyssey (London) (reissue)
- Genres: New wave, synth-pop, electro-pop
- Length: 42:29
- Labels: Venice in Peril, EMI, Capitol
- Producers: Thomas Dolby, Tim Friese-Greene

Thomas Dolby chronology
The Golden Age of Wireless (1982)	The Flat Earth (1984)

Singles from The Golden Age of Wireless
- 1. "Urges" Released: 13 February 1981; 2. "Europa and the Pirate Twins" Released: 14 September 1981; 3. "Airwaves" Released: 25 January 1982; 4. "Radio Silence" Released: 29 March 1982; 5. "Windpower" Released: 26 July 1982; 6. "She Blinded Me with Science/One of Our Submarines" Released: 25 October 1982; 7. "She Blinded Me with Science/The Jungle Line (Live)" Released: 27 June 1983

Alternative cover
- US release album cover

Professional ratings
Review scores
Source	Rating
AllMusic	4.5/5 stars
Rolling Stone	4/5 stars

The Golden Age of Wireless is the debut album by the English musician Thomas Dolby. Originally released on 10 May 1982, the album was re-issued in a number of different configurations, with later re-sequencings including the pop hit "She Blinded Me with Science".

== Background ==
Preceding the album, Dolby submitted a demo of "Airwaves" to be included on a collection titled From Brussels with Love, released on 20 November 1980 by Belgian label Les Disques Du Crépuscule. In response to friends urging him to put out a single, Dolby released his first 45 rpm 7-inch single, "Urges" backed with "Leipzig", on 13 February 1981. Under the imprint of London-based Armageddon Records, the single was co-produced by Andy Partridge of XTC, who also played percussion on the track. Sounds magazine reviewed "Urges" positively, calling Dolby a "new romantic... A Futurist Rundgren perhaps?" None of these songs were announced as singles for an upcoming album, but they later appeared on some editions of Golden Age of Wireless.

During April–May 1981, Dolby stayed in New York to join the album project 4 by Foreigner. Producer Mutt Lange requested him on the strength of a demo tape Dolby had given to Zomba Publishing, a firm with Lange serving as a partner. Dolby's synthesiser work gave the 4 album a polished sheen, especially his Brian Eno–like ambient synth intro to "Waiting for a Girl Like You". The monies earned from his session work for Foreigner allowed him to finance The Golden Age of Wireless, and the 4 album credit brought him greater notice. Dolby also toured with Foreigner sporadically in late 1981 and 1982, to promote 4 in concert.

While working on Golden Age of Wireless, Dolby was involved in several side projects. He wrote the song "New Toy" for Lene Lovich, about his new Fairlight CMI computer music instrument. In May 1981, Dolby produced the single "Dream Soldiers" by the Fallout Club, a band for which Dolby sang and played synthesisers. The Fallout Club was signed to Happy Birthday Records. In August, Dolby released a cover of the Joni Mitchell song "The Jungle Line" as a single under the artist name Low Noise, his own project on Happy Birthday Records. He was inspired to make the recording after hearing Mitchell's 1975 album The Hissing of Summer Lawns. The Fallout Club disbanded toward the end of 1981. Dolby played live shows in London, including dates at the Heaven and the Albany Empire in April 1982.

Three more of Dolby's songs appeared in late 1981 and early 1982: "Europa and the Pirate Twins" came out in September 1981 as his first release on EMI Records; "Airwaves" was issued in January 1982; and "Radio Silence" was released in March, accompanied by the announcement of the upcoming album. "Europa" reached No. 45 in Canada.

== Composition ==
In a September 2009 interview with Drowned in Sound, following the release of the "Collector's Edition" of the album, Dolby reflected on his overall theme and approach to the songs:

The songs are sort of about relationships in the face of something happening on a world level. So there's a sense of 'after the apocalypse' or impending war. A lot of them are very much about the extra weight that's added to emotional feeling in the context of wartime. I think that's a pervading feeling through all the songs. There are lots of references, like in the last verse of 'Airwaves': "No, it was nothing/Some car backfiring". You get a sense of the relationship that's going on as being overwhelmed by something on a grander level. On 'Europa', you know, it's like, 'let's meet up again after all of this is over'. There's a very strong wartime atmosphere to it.

The music of "Europa and the Pirate Twins" is a deliberate merging of past and present, combining modern synthesizers with blues harmonica playing and electronic percussion with hand claps. The central character in "Radio Silence" is a personification of Radio Caroline, a 1960s British pirate radio station.

== Release ==
The Golden Age of Wireless was finally released on 10 May 1982. EMI Records manufactured and distributed the aforementioned singles and the album, supporting Dolby's own Venice in Peril (VIP) label. VIP was named for the steady process of Venice sinking under water. Dolby said he would donate part of the label profits to stop the flooding of Venice.

The album was released five times, in different formats and layouts. All five releases appeared on vinyl, but only the third and fifth versions appeared on CD, with each changing the order of the songs, replacing the album mixes with extended or single mixes and even adding and removing entire songs. Although the LP was available in the United States by late summer 1982, it didn't chart until March 1983. "She Blinded Me With Science" was climbing the Billboard charts by then.

In the case of "Radio Silence", the US releases of the album include a different recording of the song, featuring prominent guitars, which actually predates the synthesiser version. Dolby had "pangs of doubt about the 'rockiness'" of the track, and Daniel Miller convinced him to re-record it using sequencers and drum machines.

The first US version of the album, issued by Capitol-EMI's Harvest Records imprint, excised the instrumental "The Wreck of the Fairchild" and added the two sides of Dolby's first single, "Leipzig" and "Urges". Additionally, Capitol swapped the synth-pop version of "Radio Silence" for the rock-oriented version that had previously only been available as a single B-side in the UK. Capitol also opted for the single edit of "Airwaves" and abandoned the original UK "comic book" cover in favour of a shot of Dolby on a stage during the production of Bertholt Brecht's Life of Galileo. This image had previously been used as the cover of the "Europa and the Pirate Twins" single in the UK.

After Dolby released the single "She Blinded Me with Science" (with an accompanying music video) in October 1982, backed with "One of Our Submarines", Capitol removed "Urges" and "Leipzig" from the album, added the extended version of "Science" (also known as the "US Mix") and "Submarines", and changed the album's cover art back to its original "comic book" design. Capitol also swapped the full-length version of "Windpower" for the single version (with an edited intro and outro).

In August 1983, Dolby's UK record label, Venice in Peril, followed suit and reissued the album with a similar track listing to the second US version. They opted for the short single version of "Science" but retained the full-length versions of "Airwaves" and "Windpower" and the synthesiser-driven version of "Radio Silence", just as all three had appeared on the first UK edition. This is the edition that is widely available on CD to this day, on both sides of the Atlantic.

A remastered "Collector's Edition" of The Golden Age of Wireless was released on 13 July 2009, complete with bonus tracks, personal sleeve notes and a DVD of the Live Wireless music video.

== Reception ==
=== Critical ===
In October 1982, Don Shewey of Rolling Stone magazine rated The Golden Age of Wireless four stars out of five, calling it "one of the most impressive debuts" of 1982. Shewey compared the album's melodicism to the works of Paul McCartney and concluded that "unlike many synthesizer bands from England, Dolby eschews morbid, droogy drones." In December, Connor Cochran of Musician magazine said the album was "the best damned record to come out of Europe's current fascination with synth-pop. Period." He added, "Dolby is purely amazing. And best of all, he writes songs." In The Trouser Press Guide to New Wave Records (1983), Trouser Press writer Steven Grant praised the album, stating, "Besides demonstrating an unfailing flair for sharp, snappy compositions, Dolby shows himself unusually capable of getting warm, touching feeling out of his synthesizers and his voice, creating an evocative sound that magnificently straddles nostalgia and futurism." However, Trouser Press later dismissed the album's follow-up single, "She Blinded Me With Science", as "insufferable."

In a retrospective review for AllMusic, Ned Raggett called the album "an intriguing and often very entertaining curio from the glory days of synth pop", comparing Dolby favourably to David Bowie, Bryan Ferry and Gary Numan. Raggett concluded that "Dolby's melodies are sprightly without being annoyingly perky, his singing warm, and his overall performance a pleasant gem."

=== Commercial ===
The Golden Age of Wireless sold very well in the US, peaking at No. 13 on the Billboard albums chart in mid-June 1983. In Canada the album was No. 8 for four weeks and was on the chart for twenty-one weeks, finishing No. 38 on the year-end chart. "She Blinded Me with Science" had already become a major hit, receiving constant radio and MTV airplay and reaching No. 5 on the Billboard Hot 100 in May, and No. 1 in Canada for two weeks. "Europa and the Pirate Twins" did not fare as well in the US, peaking at No. 67 in July, and No. 45 in Canada.

== Track listing ==
All songs written by Thomas Dolby, except "Commercial Breakup" and "She Blinded Me With Science", by Dolby and Jo Kerr.

=== 1982: First UK release: Venice in Peril VIP 1001 ===
Side one
No.	Title	Length
1.	"Flying North"	3:50
2.	"Commercial Breakup"	4:15
3.	"Weightless"	3:45
4.	"Europa and the Pirate Twins"	3:18
5.	"Windpower"	4:20

Side two
No.	Title	Length
1.	"The Wreck of the Fairchild"	3:30
2.	"Airwaves"	5:12
3.	"Radio Silence"	3:43
4.	"Cloudburst at Shingle Street"	5:45

The original UK track listing (including its reappearance on the 2009 Collector's Edition CD) is the only place one can hear the progression of "The Wreck of the Fairchild" into "Airwaves" and then into the synth version of "Radio Silence". "Fairchild" concludes with the sound of various electronics, including a PPG Wave Computer (an early wave-table synthesiser), which segues into the intro of "Airwaves" with no break. The remnants of this transition can still be heard at the beginning of the full-length version of "Airwaves" used on other configurations of the album.

=== 1982: First US release: Harvest ST-12203 ===
Compared to the original UK release, the initial US release deletes "The Wreck of the Fairchild", adds "Urges" and "Leipzig", and presents an edited version of "Airwaves" and the guitar version of "Radio Silence".

Side one
No.	Title	Length
1.	"Europa and the Pirate Twins"	3:18
2.	"Flying North"	3:50
3.	"Weightless"	3:45
4.	"Leipzig"	3:52
5.	"Windpower"	4:20

Side two
No.	Title	Length
1.	"Commercial Breakup"	4:15
2.	"Urges"	3:39
3.	"Airwaves" (Single Edit)	3:35
4.	"Radio Silence" (Guitar Version)	4:32
5.	"Cloudburst at Shingle Street"	5:45

=== 1983: Second US release: Capitol ST-12271 ===
Compared to the original US release, the second US release deletes "Urges" and "Leipzig", adds "One of Our Submarines" and an extended version of "She Blinded Me with Science", and presents an edited version of "Windpower".

Side one
No.	Title	Length
1.	"She Blinded Me with Science" (Extended Version)	5:09
2.	"Radio Silence" (Guitar Version)	4:32
3.	"Airwaves" (Single Edit)	3:35
4.	"Flying North"	3:50
5.	"Weightless"	3:45

Side two
No.	Title	Length
1.	"Europa and the Pirate Twins"	3:18
2.	"Windpower" (Single Edit)	3:56
3.	"Commercial Breakup"	4:15
4.	"One of Our Submarines"	5:11
5.	"Cloudburst at Shingle Street"	5:45

A third US version restores the synth version of "Radio Silence".

=== 1983: Second UK release: Venice in Peril/EMI VIP 1076071 ===
Compared to the original UK release, the second UK release deletes "The Wreck of the Fairchild" and adds "One of Our Submarines" and the short version of "She Blinded Me with Science". The 1983 UK CD release (EMI CDP 7 46009 2) and 1984 US CD release (Capitol CDP 7 46009 2) both feature the same set of tracks listed here.

Side one
No.	Title	Length
1.	"She Blinded Me with Science"	3:42
2.	"Radio Silence"	3:43
3.	"Airwaves"	5:12
4.	"Flying North"	3:50
5.	"Weightless"	3:45

Side two
No.	Title	Length
1.	"Europa and the Pirate Twins"	3:18
2.	"Windpower"	4:20
3.	"Commercial Breakup"	4:15
4.	"One of Our Submarines"	5:11
5.	"Cloudburst at Shingle Street"	5:45

=== 2009: Remastered Collector's Edition CD: EMI 50999 2 67915 2 4 ===
This version includes the original UK album tracks, in sequence, as tracks 1–9. Bonus tracks 10–14 were previously included on various re-issues during 1982–84. Track 15 was initially released as the B-side of the Low Noise single "The Jungle Line" but was overdubbed for this release with a new harmony vocal by Dolby's son Harper Robertson. "Therapy/Growth (Demo)" was released on the "Europa and the Pirate Twins" singles, without the demo credit. A full recording was made, but has not been legitimately released. "Airwaves (Demo)" first appeared on the 1980 compilation cassette From Brussels with Love (the first release by the label Les Disques du Crépuscule), which has been reissued at various times as a double LP, CD and deluxe 2-CD set. Tracks 18 and 19 are previously unreleased.

No.	Title	Length
1.	"Flying North"	3:50
2.	"Commercial Breakup"	4:18
3.	"Weightless"	3:49
4.	"Europa and the Pirate Twins"	3:19
5.	"Windpower"	4:20
6.	"The Wreck of the Fairchild"	3:29
7.	"Airwaves"	5:19
8.	"Radio Silence"	3:51
9.	"Cloudburst at Shingle Street"	5:46

Bonus tracks
No.	Title	Length
10.	"One of Our Submarines"	5:11
11.	"She Blinded Me with Science"	3:42
12.	"Radio Silence (Guitar Version)"	4:52
13.	"Urges"	3:39
14.	"Leipzig"	3:53
15.	"Urban Tribal"	3:45
16.	"Therapy/Growth (Demo)"	4:05
17.	"Airwaves (Demo)"	5:20
18.	"Sale of the Century (Demo)" (original version of "The Wreck of the Fairchild" with lyrics)	2:52
19.	"Pedestrian Walkway (Demo)"	1:27

Also included with this release is a DVD containing a remastered version of the long-form performance video Live Wireless, recorded at the Riverside Theatre Studios, London, and originally released on videocassette on 9 November 1983 by Picture Music International (TVE 901572).

Bonus downloads from www.thomasdolby.com
No.	Title	Length
1.	"Flying North (Demo)"	4:45
2.	"Commercial Breakup (Live)"	4:29
3.	"Urges (Live)"	4:22
4.	"Pedestrian Walkway (The Fallout Club Version)"	3:11

=== 2019: Echo/BMG re-release ===
In November 2019, BMG division the Echo Label, which acquired Dolby's catalogue from Warner Music Group in 2017, re-released the record on vinyl and CD. The "splatter vinyl" edition (Echo 7157) repeats the track sequence of the original UK release, with "She Blinded Me With Science" added as the final track. The CD edition (BMGCAT402CD) consists of the first 14 tracks of the 2009 remaster but with "Radio Silence (Guitar Version)" moved to the final track, following "Urges" and "Leipzig".

== Personnel ==
Musicians

- Thomas Dolby – vocals, drum programs (1, 5, 8; "She Blinded Me With Science", "One of Our Submarines"), piano (1, 3, 6, 7, 9), wave computer (1, 3–5, 8, 9; "She Blinded Me With Science", "One of Our Submarines"), synthesiser (2–4, 7; "Leipzig", "Urges", "Radio Silence (Guitar Version)"), monk voice (3), backing vocals (3, 4, 6, 7, 9; "Radio Silence (Guitar Version)"), electronic percussion (4), kalimba (6)
- James Allen – backing vocals (3, 9)
- Kevin Armstrong – guitar (1, 4, 6, 7, 9; "Radio Silence (Guitar Version)", "She Blinded Me With Science", "One of Our Submarines"), backing vocals ("One of Our Submarines")
- Dave Birch – guitar (1), monk voice (3), backing vocals ("Radio Silence (Guitar Version)")
- Bosco – percussion ("Radio Silence (Guitar Version)")
- Les Chappell – backing vocals (3, 4, 9)
- Judy Evans – backing vocals (3, 9)
- Lesley Fairbairn – backing vocals (1, 3, 9)
- Mark Heyward-Chaplin – bass guitar (2–4, 6, 7, 9)
- Justin Hildreth – backwards percussion (1), drums (2–4, 6, 7, 9; "Radio Silence (Guitar Version)")
- Simon House – violin ("She Blinded Me With Science")
- Tim Kerr – violin ("Leipzig")
- Mutt Lange – backing vocals ("She Blinded Me With Science")
- Simon Lloyd – leadline bass, flute (5)
- Lene Lovich – backing vocals (3, 9), mantra ("Radio Silence (Guitar Version)")
- John Marsh – shipping forecast (5)
- Daniel Miller – synthesiser (8)
- Guido Orlando – Chilean translations, distress, Grace (6)
- Andy Partridge – harmonica (4), percussion ("Urges")
- Dr. Magnus Pyke – voice-overs ("She Blinded Me With Science")
- Matthew Seligman – Moog bass ("She Blinded Me With Science", "One of Our Submarines")
- Miriam Stockley – backing vocals ("She Blinded Me With Science")
- Bruce Woolley – monk voice (3), backing vocals (6, 7; "Radio Silence (Guitar Version)")
- Akiko Yano – backing vocals (8)

Technical

- Thomas Dolby – producer, cover
- Wally Brill – engineer
- Chris Birkett – engineer
- Tim Hunt – engineer
- Chris Stone – engineer
- Mike Hedges – engineer
- Graham Carmichael – engineer
- Martin Levan – engineer
- Peter Woolliscroft – engineer
- Barry Kingston – engineer
- Andrew Douglas – cover, photography
- Carol Hewison – photography assistant
- Bill Smith – layout
- Andy Partridge – co-producer ("Leipzig", "Urges")
- Tim Friese-Greene – co-producer ("She Blinded Me With Science", "One of Our Submarines")

== Certifications ==
Certifications
Region	Certification	Certified units/sales
Canada (Music Canada)	Gold	50,000^{^}
^{^} Shipments figures based on certification alone.
