= The Flat Earth =

1984 studio album by Thomas Dolby

Studio album by Thomas Dolby
- Released: 6 February 1984
- Recorded: 1982–1983
- Genres: Synth-pop; jazz; world
- Length: 37:22
- Labels: EMI; Capitol
- Producer: Thomas Dolby

Thomas Dolby chronology
The Golden Age of Wireless (1982)	The Flat Earth (1984)	Aliens Ate My Buick (1988)

Singles from The Flat Earth
- 1. "Hyperactive!" Released: 9 January 1984; 2. "I Scare Myself" Released: 19 March 1984; 3. "Dissidents" Released: 11 June 1984

Alternative cover
- CD release booklet cover

The Flat Earth is the second studio album by the English new wave and synth-pop musician Thomas Dolby, released on 6 February 1984 by EMI and Capitol Records.

A remastered Collector's Edition of The Flat Earth was released on 13 July 2009, featuring bonus tracks and new sleeve notes.

== Release ==
The Flat Earth peaked at No. 14 on the UK Albums Chart. The first single from the album was "Hyperactive!", which peaked at No. 17 in the UK singles chart, making it Dolby's highest-charting single in his home country. Second and third singles, "I Scare Myself" and "Dissidents", peaked at Nos. 46 and 90, respectively. The album charted at No. 35 on the US Billboard 200. In Canada, it reached number 21 in the weekly charts and was number 71 in the year-end chart.

== Critical reception ==
Professional ratings
Review scores
Source	Rating
AllMusic	4/5 stars
Rolling Stone	4/5 stars
The Village Voice	C+

Music journalist Robert Christgau gave the album a C+, and stated that "Dolby is a bright and honest fellow by no means in thrall to his synthesizers. "She Blinded Me With Science" proved he knows his way around a good beat, and the lyric sheet bespeaks a level of literacy rarely achieved by songwriters. But as with so many artists fascinated by synthesizers (and more than a few beguiled by their own literacy), his passion for texture subsumes what small knack he has for cruder, more linear devices. If there's an objective correlative for boring, that's it."

In a retrospective review for AllMusic, critic Glenn Swan wrote that "Exceptionally mature for a sophomore effort, The Flat Earth has held up considerably well since its 1984 release. This staying power belongs to a fantastic ensemble of supporting players as much as to Thomas Dolby's songwriting and crisp production."

== Track listing ==
All songs written by Thomas Dolby, except where otherwise indicated.

=== Original LP ===
Side A

1. "Dissidents" (Thomas Dolby, Kevin Armstrong, Matthew Seligman) – 4:56
2. "The Flat Earth" – 6:41
3. "Screen Kiss" – 5:33

Side B

4. "White City" – 5:19
5. "Mulu the Rain Forest" – 5:00
6. "I Scare Myself" (Dan Hicks) – 5:40
7. "Hyperactive!" – 4:13

=== 2009 Collector's Edition CD bonus tracks ===
8. "Get Out of My Mix (Dolby's Cube)" – 4:44
9. "Puppet Theatre" (Dolby, Seligman) – 4:14
10. "Dissidents (The Search for Truth Part 1)" (Dolby, Armstrong, Seligman) – 7:17
11. "Field Work (London Mix)" (with Ryuichi Sakamoto) (Dolby, Sakamoto) – 4:05
12. "Don't Turn Away" (from the film Howard the Duck) (Dolby, Allee Willis) – 5:03
13. "The Devil Is an Englishman" (from the film Gothic) (Dolby, Stephen Volk) – 3:30
14. "I Scare Myself" (live on tour, 1984) (Hicks) – 6:17
15. "Marseille" (live on tour, 1984) (Dolby, Adele Bertei) – 4:41

=== Bonus audio downloads from thomasdolby.com ===
- "Audio Lecture/White City" – 8:11
- "Dissidents" (live) (Dolby, Armstrong, Seligman) – 4:46
- "I Scare Myself" (live) (Hicks) – 5:36
- "New Toy" (live) – 4:22
- "Puppet Theatre" (alternate version) (Dolby, Seligman) – 4:19

=== 2024 40th Anniversary bonus tracks ===
8. "Get Out of My Mix (Dolby's Cube)" – 4:44
9. "Puppet Theatre" (Dolby, Seligman) – 4:14
10. "Dissidents (The Search for Truth Part 1)" (Dolby, Armstrong, Seligman) – 7:17
11. "Hyperactive! (Heavy Breather Subversion)" – 5:06
12. "May the Cube Be With You" – 3:49
13. "Don't Turn Away" (from the film Howard the Duck) (Dolby, Willis) – 5:03
14. "The Devil Is an Englishman" (from the film Gothic) (Dolby, Volk) – 3:30
15. "Puppet Theatre (Alternative Version)" – 4:21
16. "Dissidents (LP Edit)" – 3:51
17. "I Scare Myself" (Edit) (Hicks) – 4:59
18. "Therapy/Growth (Demo)" – 4:06
19. "Audio Lecture/White City" – 8:12
20. "Marseille" (live on tour, 1984) (Dolby, Bertei) – 4:41
21. "I Scare Myself" (live on tour, 1984) (Hicks) – 6:17
22. "New Toy" – 4:23
23. "Dissidents (Live)" – 4:48
24. "The Flat Earth (Live from The Sole Inhabitant)" – 6:47

== Personnel ==
Musicians

- Thomas Dolby – keyboards, piano, programming, sampling, effects, vocals
- Matthew Seligman – bass guitar
- Kevin Armstrong – guitar, backing vocals, trumpet, "The Analyst"
- Clif Brigden – percussion, computer drums
- Adele Bertei – backing vocals (tracks 1, 2, 7)
- Lesley Fairbairn – backing vocals (tracks 2, 3, 6, 14, 15)
- Bruce Woolley – backing vocals (track 5)
- Matthew Salt – tins, thunder sheet (track 7)
- Peter Thoms – trombone (tracks 6, 7)
- Justin Hildreth – drums (tracks 7, 14, 15)
- Robyn Hitchcock – "Keith" (track 4)
- Louise Ulfstedt – "The Analyst" (track 7)
- Stevie Wonder – harmonica (track 12)
- Chucho Merchán – guitar (tracks 14, 15)
- Debra Barsha – keyboards, backing vocals (tracks 14, 15)
- Lyndon Connah – keyboards, backing vocals (tracks 14, 15)

Technical

- Dan Lacksman – engineer
- Mike Shipley – mixing (tracks 1–6)
- Alan Douglas – mixing (track 7)
- Thomas Dolby – producer; mixing (tracks 8–15); album design
- Ryuichi Sakamoto – producer (track 11)
- Wally Traugott – mastering
- Richard Haughton – photography
- Assorted iMAGes – graphics, album design

== Charts ==
Chart	Peak position
Canada Top Albums/CDs (RPM)	21
Dutch Albums (Album Top 100)	18
New Zealand Albums (RMNZ)	28
Swedish Albums (Sverigetopplistan)	50
UK Albums (Official Charts)	14
US Billboard 200	35

== Certifications ==
Certifications for The Flat Earth
Region	Certification	Certified units/sales
Canada (Music Canada)	Gold	50,000^{^}
United Kingdom (BPI)	Silver	60,000^{^}
^{^} Shipments figures based on certification alone.
