= Aliens Ate My Buick =

Studio album by Thomas Dolby
- Released: 25 April 1988
- Studios: Soundcastle (Los Angeles); Smoketree (Los Angeles)
- Genres: New wave; funk
- Length: 44:52
- Label: EMI Manhattan
- Producers: Thomas Dolby; Bill Bottrell

Thomas Dolby chronology
The Flat Earth (1984)	Aliens Ate My Buick (1988)	Astronauts & Heretics (1992)

Singles from Aliens Ate My Buick
- 1. "Airhead" Released: 28 March 1988; 2. "Hot Sauce" Released: 3 January 1989; 3. "My Brain Is Like a Sieve" Released: 29 August 1989

Professional ratings
Review scores
Source	Rating
AllMusic	2/5 stars
Rolling Stone	2/5 stars

Aliens Ate My Buick is the third studio album by English new wave/synth-pop musician Thomas Dolby, released on 25 April 1988.

== Critical reception ==
In a contemporary review for Cashbox, the magazine gave the album a highly positive forecast, praising the "coupling of Dolby’s inimitable lyrical stylings and top musicianship." The reviewer predicted that the record would become an "instant success at a variety of levels" for the EMI-Manhattan label, specifically noting that the lead single, "Airhead," was poised to quickly capture radio attention and "prove a huge hit."

Music & Media designated Aliens Ate My Buick as their album of the week in the 14 May 1986. They said that Dolby and his backing band had created an "utterly enthusiastic and intelligent sound" on Aliens Ate My Buick and highlighted its "honest, clear production."

== Chart performance ==
The album peaked at number 30 on the UK Albums Chart. The lead single from the album, "Airhead", peaked at number 53. Second and third singles, "Hot Sauce" and "My Brain Is Like a Sieve", peaked at number 80 and number 89, respectively. In the US, the album peaked at number 70. In Canada the album reached number 76.

Dolby has said in interviews that he believes the album's commercial failure was due to his change in musical direction.

== Track listing ==
All songs by Thomas Dolby, unless otherwise indicated.

1. "The Key to Her Ferrari" – 4:39
2. "Airhead" (Dolby, Grant Morris) – 5:07
3. "Hot Sauce" (George Clinton) – 5:03
4. "Pulp Culture" – 5:35
5. "My Brain Is Like a Sieve" – 4:52
6. "The Ability to Swing" (Dolby, Matthew Seligman) – 4:30
7. "Budapest by Blimp" – 8:40
8. "May the Cube Be with You" – 6:49 (CD/cassette bonus track)

== Personnel ==
- Thomas Dolby – vocals, keyboards

The Lost Toy People

- Larry Treadwell – guitar
- Mike Kapitan – synthesizer
- Terry Jackson – bass
- David Owens – drums
- Laura Creamer – vocals, percussion

Additional musicians

- Robin Leach – voiceover (track 1)
- Ed Asner – voiceover (track 5)
- Edie Lehmann – backing vocals (track 1)
- Donny Geraldo – backing vocals (track 1)
- Mendy Lee – backing vocals (track 1)
- Bruce Woolley – backing vocals (track 2)
- Colin Crabtree – backing vocals (track 2)
- Rose Banks Stone – backing vocals (track 3–5)
- Jean Johnson McRath – backing vocals (tracks 3–5)
- Lesley Fairbairn – backing vocals (track 7)
- Bill Watrous – trombone
- Arno Lucas – congas, timbales
- Bill Bottrell – spaghetti western guitar (track 3)
- Csilla Kecskesi – Hungarian aria (track 7)
- Erica Kiss – Hungarian translation (track 7)
- Gueysel Tejada – domestic cleaning and outburst (track 3)

Technical

- Thomas Dolby – co-producer, arrangements
- Bill Bottrell – co-producer, engineer
- The Lost Toy People – arrangements
- Steve Vance – artwork, typography
- Leslie Burke – front cover and inner sleeve photography
- Dennis Keeley – back cover photography
- Kathleen Beller – front cover model
- Mike Tacci – second engineer
- Daryl Koutnik – second engineer
