= Thomas Dolby =

English musician (born 1958)

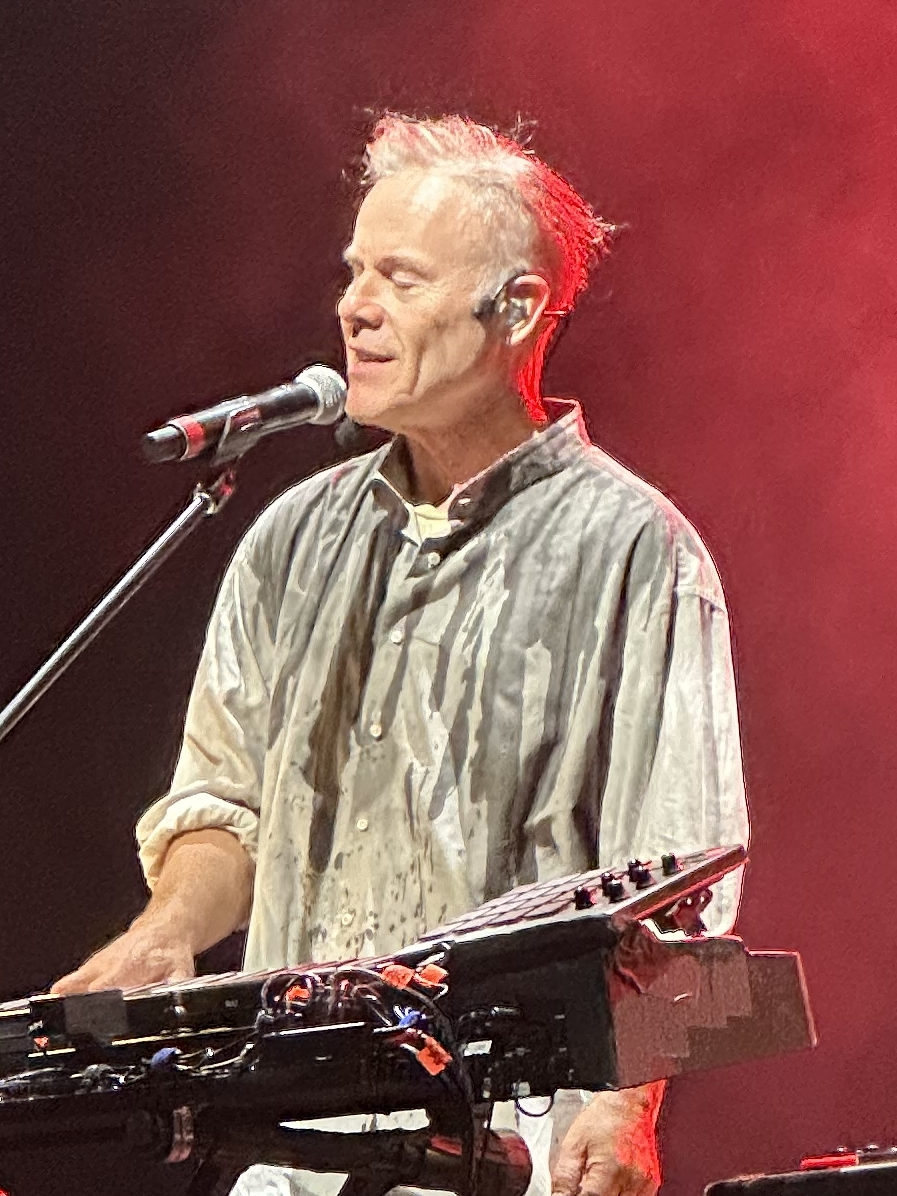
- Dolby performing in 2024

Background information
- Born: Thomas Morgan Robertson; 14 October 1958 (age 68); London, England
- Genres: New wave; synth-pop; funk; film music; ambient; post-punk
- Occupations: Singer-songwriter; musician; record producer; composer; entrepreneur; teacher; musical director
- Instruments: Keyboards; vocals
- Works: Discography
- Years active: 1979–present
- Labels: Capitol; EMI; Giant; Warner Bros.; Invisible Hands Music; Echo; Bertelsmann Music Group
- Formerly of: The Fallout Club; The Camera Club
- Website: thomasdolby.com

Thomas Morgan Robertson (born 14 October 1958), known by the stage name Thomas Dolby, is an English musician, record producer, composer, entrepreneur and teacher.

Dolby came to prominence in the 1980s, releasing international hit singles including "She Blinded Me with Science" (1982) and "Hyperactive!" (1984). He has also worked as a producer and as a session musician.

In the 1990s, Dolby founded Beatnik, a Silicon Valley software company whose technology was used to play internet audio and later ringtones, most notably on Nokia phones. He was also the music director for TED Conferences. On the faculty at the Peabody Institute at Johns Hopkins University since 2014, Dolby leads Peabody's Music for New Media program, which enrolled its first students in the fall of 2018.

== Early life ==
Dolby was born Thomas Morgan Robertson in London, England, to Theodosia Cecil (née Spring Rice, 1921–1984) and Martin Robertson (1911–2004), professor of classical Greek art and Archaeology at the University of London, Oxford University, and Trinity College, Cambridge. His older brother is the academic Stephen Robertson. In at least one interview in the 1980s, Dolby claimed, "I was born in Cairo, because my father is an archaeologist" — many subsequent articles have republished or reprinted this spurious claim.

At school in London, Dolby was good friends with Shane MacGowan of The Pogues and used to sit with him in the back row of the English Literature class. Dolby described him as "extremely smart". Dolby later attended Abingdon School in Oxfordshire, England, from 1975 to 1976, where he completed his A Levels. One of his first jobs was a part-time position at a fruit and vegetable shop. In his youth, Dolby lived or worked in France, Italy, and Greece.

Dolby spoke of his early musical experiences in a 2012 interview:

I sang in a choir when I was 10 or 11, and learned to sightread single lines, but other than that I don't have a formal education. I picked up the guitar initially, playing folk tunes—Dylan—then I graduated to piano when I got interested in jazz, listening to people like Oscar Peterson, Dave Brubeck, Bill Evans, Thelonious Monk, and so on. The first electronic instruments started to become accessible in the mid-70s, and I got my hands on a kit built synthesizer and never looked back.

== Stage name ==
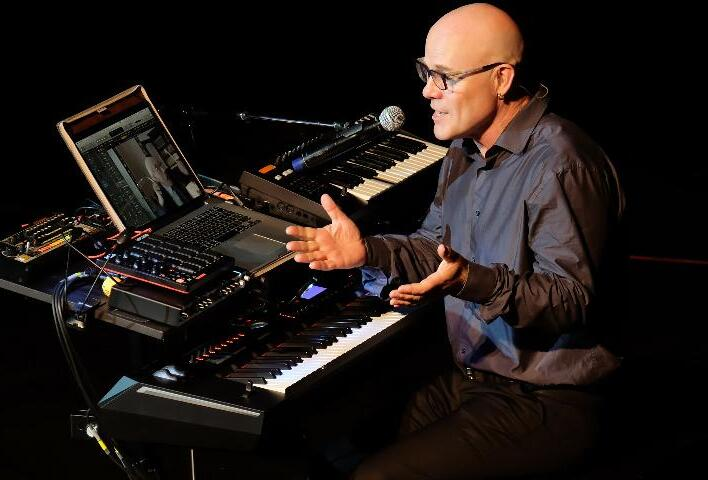
Dolby performing in 2018

The stage name Thomas Dolby originated from a nickname "Dolby" that he picked up in the early 1970s, when he was "always messing around with keyboards and tapes". The name derives from that of the audio noise-reduction process of Dolby Laboratories, used to improve the quality of audio recording and playback. He adopted the stage name "Thomas Dolby" to avoid confusion with British singer Tom Robinson, who was popular when he began his career. Early publicity implied that "Dolby" was a middle name, and that Dolby's full name was Thomas Morgan Dolby Robertson. Although that is legally incorrect, he does sometimes informally go by the initials TMDR.

After Dolby released "She Blinded Me with Science" in 1982, Dolby Laboratories expressed concern regarding the stage name. Dolby's record label refused to make him change his name, and Dolby Labs did not raise the issue again until later. After a lengthy legal battle, the court decided that Dolby Labs had no right to restrict the musician from using the name. It was agreed that he would not release any electronic equipment using the name.

Dolby is unrelated to Thomas "Tom" Dolby, who is a novelist, filmmaker, and son of the Dolby Laboratories founder Ray Dolby.

== Music career ==
In the late 1970s Dolby formed the Camera Club with Bruce Woolley. After leaving the Camera Club he joined Lene Lovich's band as keyboardist and wrote her hit song "New Toy". He also wrote songs for other artists and worked as a record producer before launching his solo career in 1981.

== Solo music career ==
Dolby is associated with the new wave movement of the early 1980s, a form of pop music incorporating electronic instruments, but Dolby's work covers a wide range of musical styles and moods distinct from the high-energy pop sound of his few, better-known commercial successes.

=== The Golden Age of Wireless ===
Originally released in the UK and US and including the songs "Europa and the Pirate Twins", "Airwaves", and "Radio Silence", the first releases of Dolby's first solo album, The Golden Age of Wireless (Harvest, 1982) did not include the signature hit, "She Blinded Me with Science". After the five-song EP Blinded by Science introduced the catchy single, The Golden Age of Wireless was re-released with the single that, combined with its accompanying video, became Dolby's most commercially successful single, reaching No. 5 on the Billboard Hot 100.

The Golden Age of Wireless reached No. 13 on the Billboard album chart. It juxtaposed themes of radio technology, aircraft, and naval submarines with those of relationships and nostalgia. While much of the album's instrumentation is synthesisers and samplers, the album credits a long list of guest musicians as well, with instruments ranging from harmonica and violin to guitar and percussion.

=== Dolby's Cube ===
Beginning in 1983, Dolby collaborated with a number of artists in an occasional studio-bound project called Dolby's Cube. The project had no set line-up, and was essentially a forum for Dolby to release material that was more dance-oriented. Dolby's Cube released a single in 1983 ("Get Out of My Mix"), another in 1985 ("May the Cube Be with You"), and performed soundtrack work for the film Howard the Duck in 1986. Collaborators in Dolby's Cube at various junctures included Lene Lovich, George Clinton of Parliament-Funkadelic, Francois Kevorkian, and Lea Thompson.

=== The Flat Earth ===
In 1984, Dolby released his second LP, The Flat Earth (Capitol), which peaked at No. 14 on the UK Albums Chart and at No. 35 on the Billboard album chart in the US. With a wide range of influences including nostalgic jazz, funk-tinged Motown R&B, and world music along with a strong electronic element, and featuring a slew of guest musicians including longtime Dolby collaborator Matthew Seligman on bass, Kevin Armstrong on guitar, Clif Brigden on percussion, and guest vocals from Robyn Hitchcock, Bruce Woolley, and others, The Flat Earth further established Dolby's wide range of talents as musician, songwriter, and producer. The album included a cover of the Dan Hicks song "I Scare Myself."

"Hyperactive!" was the first and most successful single from the album, peaking at No. 17 on the UK Singles Chart, making it Dolby's highest-charting single in his home country.

=== Aliens Ate My Buick ===
In contrast to the overall introverted nature of The Flat Earth, Dolby described his next release, Aliens Ate My Buick (1988):

I think it's very bold. Some people who've known my stuff from the beginning find it a bit hard to stomach. They think it's a bit brash. It's certainly unsubtle in a lot of ways. It goes for the jugular. There was always a side to the stuff that I did that was very extroverted and wacky. The flip side of the coin was the more atmospheric, moody stuff. There was always room for both of them. But this album, with the exception of maybe one song ["Budapest by Blimp"], is all on the extrovert side.

Aliens Ate My Buick was strongly funk and dance influenced. The first single was "Airhead", a satirical song about a stereotypical young-and-rich California woman, which peaked at No. 53. The second single, "Hot Sauce", a George Clinton song, peaked at No. 80. Another single, "My Brain Is Like a Sieve," peaked at No. 89 on the UK Singles Chart. The album was co-produced by Bill Bottrell, and featured Terry Jackson on bass guitar.

=== Astronauts & Heretics ===
For Astronauts & Heretics (Virgin UK), Dolby expanded even further stylistically, starting the songwriting process at the piano, then again collaborating with a variety of guest musicians. Both Bob Weir and Jerry Garcia played guitar on "The Beauty of a Dream". Eddie Van Halen plays on "Eastern Bloc" and "Close but No Cigar". Other collaborators included Jimmy Z on sax, Budgie (of Siouxsie and the Banshees) on drums and Leland Sklar on bass guitar. Terry Jackson also contributed bass guitar on four songs before his 1991 death in a plane accident with seven other members of Reba McEntire's support band for her "For My Broken Heart" tour.

The highest-charting song off this album was "Close but No Cigar," which reached No. 22 on the UK charts. Two other songs on the album, "I Love You Goodbye" and "Silk Pyjamas", employed Zydeco influences, courtesy of Crowley, Louisiana, and guest musicians Michael Doucet of BeauSoleil on violin, Wayne Toups on accordion, and Al Tharp on banjo. Even though some recording for the album was done in remote locations, the bulk of Astronauts & Heretics was recorded at NRG Recording Studios with input from trusted Dolby co-producer Bill Bottrell, and mixed down at Smoke Tree Studios in Chatsworth, California.

=== The Sole Inhabitant ===
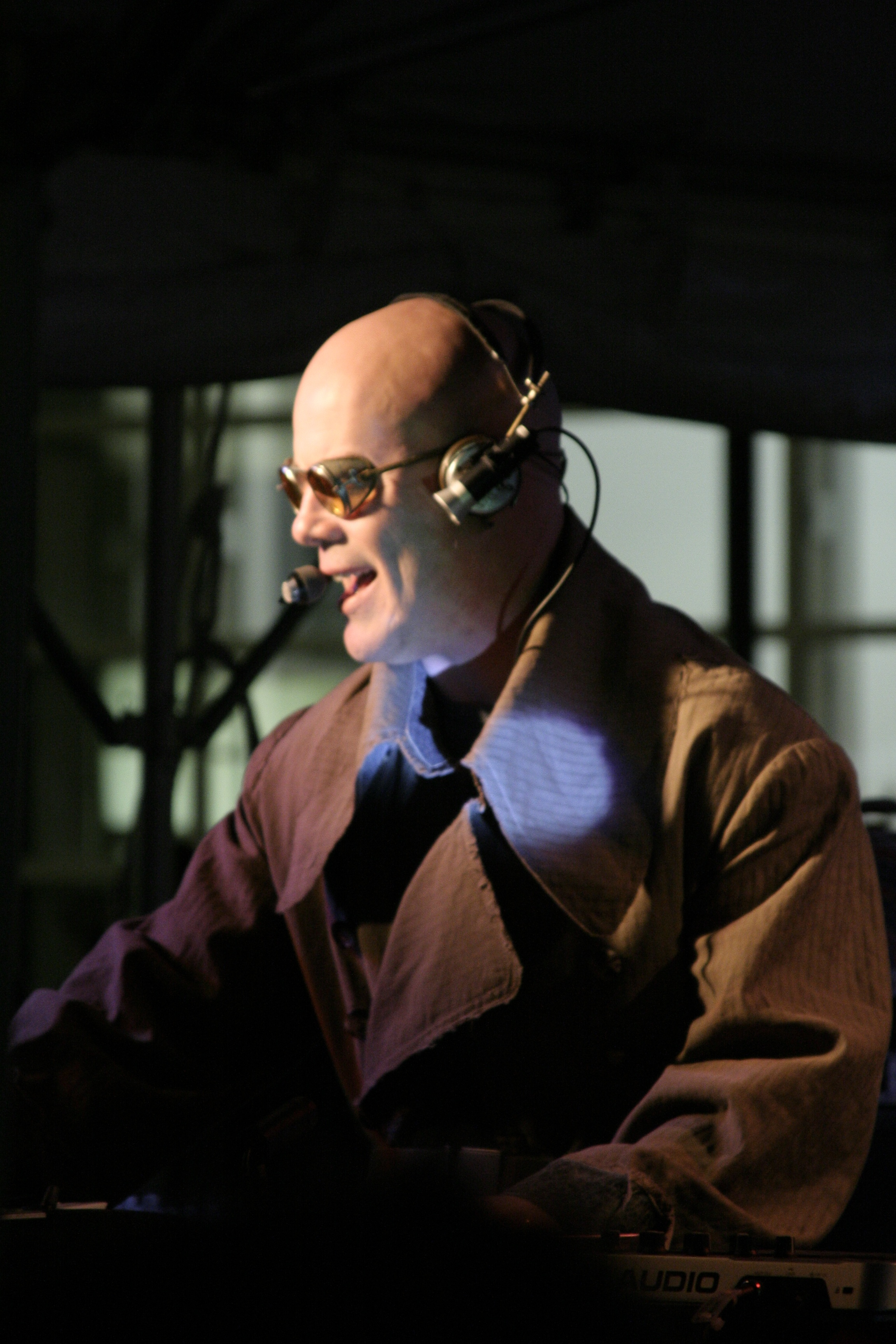
Dolby performing in 2006

Following his involvement in Beatnik, Dolby returned to his musical career in 2006. He performed his first public solo show in 15 years at the Red Devil Lounge in San Francisco, California, on 21 January 2006, surprising the crowd who were there to see local band Notorious. He then launched an American tour, the Sole Inhabitant Tour, on 12 April 2006, comprising a string of small dates in California, a science education benefit in Boulder, Colorado, and gigs across America before receptive crowds.

The United States leg of the "Sole Inhabitant Tour 2006" was captured on a "live" CD and DVD. The CD represents a recording of two gigs played by Dolby at Martyrs in Chicago, while the DVD was filmed at the Berklee Performance Center at Berklee College of Music. The DVD also includes a 30-minute interview and a lecture by Dolby at the college. Both the CD and DVD were released in November 2006. Dolby autographed and numbered the first 1,000 copies of the CD and DVD.

A show at the 800-capacity Scala club in London was booked for 3 July 2006 as a warm-up for Dolby's Hyde Park set opening for Depeche Mode. The show sold out in a matter of days and prompted Dolby to reprioritise the UK, resulting in him moving with his family from California back to England and in a nine-date Sole Inhabitant tour of the UK in October 2007, coinciding with the release of a lavish box set of the Sole Inhabitant CD and DVD by UK independent label Invisible Hands Music.

Thomas toured throughout the months of November and December 2006 with electronic musician BT. This tour included a version of "Airwaves" that BT added his own technique to, which was the opening song on the UK leg of the Sole Inhabitant tour (sans BT).

Thomas Dolby's 15 March 2007 performance at the South by Southwest festival was released as the live EP Thomas Dolby & The Jazz Mafia Horns, Live at SxSW (with musicians from San Francisco's Jazz Mafia collective).

The 2007 UK Sole Inhabitant tour included three new songs previously played on the US tour, one called "Your Karma Hit My Dogma", another called "Jealous Thing", and a cover version of the Special AKA's "What I Like Most About You Is Your Girlfriend." "Your Karma Hit My Dogma" was inspired by Kevin Federline's unauthorised use of a sample from Mobb Deep's "Got It Twisted," which in turn had used an authorised sample of "She Blinded Me with Science." The tag line from that story became the title of the song. The wording was lifted by Thomas from a bumper sticker on a car that he saw whilst living in the San Francisco Bay area. In a move close to performance art, Dolby tried to post a 'cease and desist' legal letter on Kevin Federline's MySpace page when other attempts to contact him proved fruitless. The song is on the Live at SxSW EP.

The second new song, "Jealous Thing", was performed at least at The Graduate in Cambridge and London's Islington Academy on the UK tour in Summer 2007 and features a Bossa-Nova type rhythm.

=== 2009 reissues ===
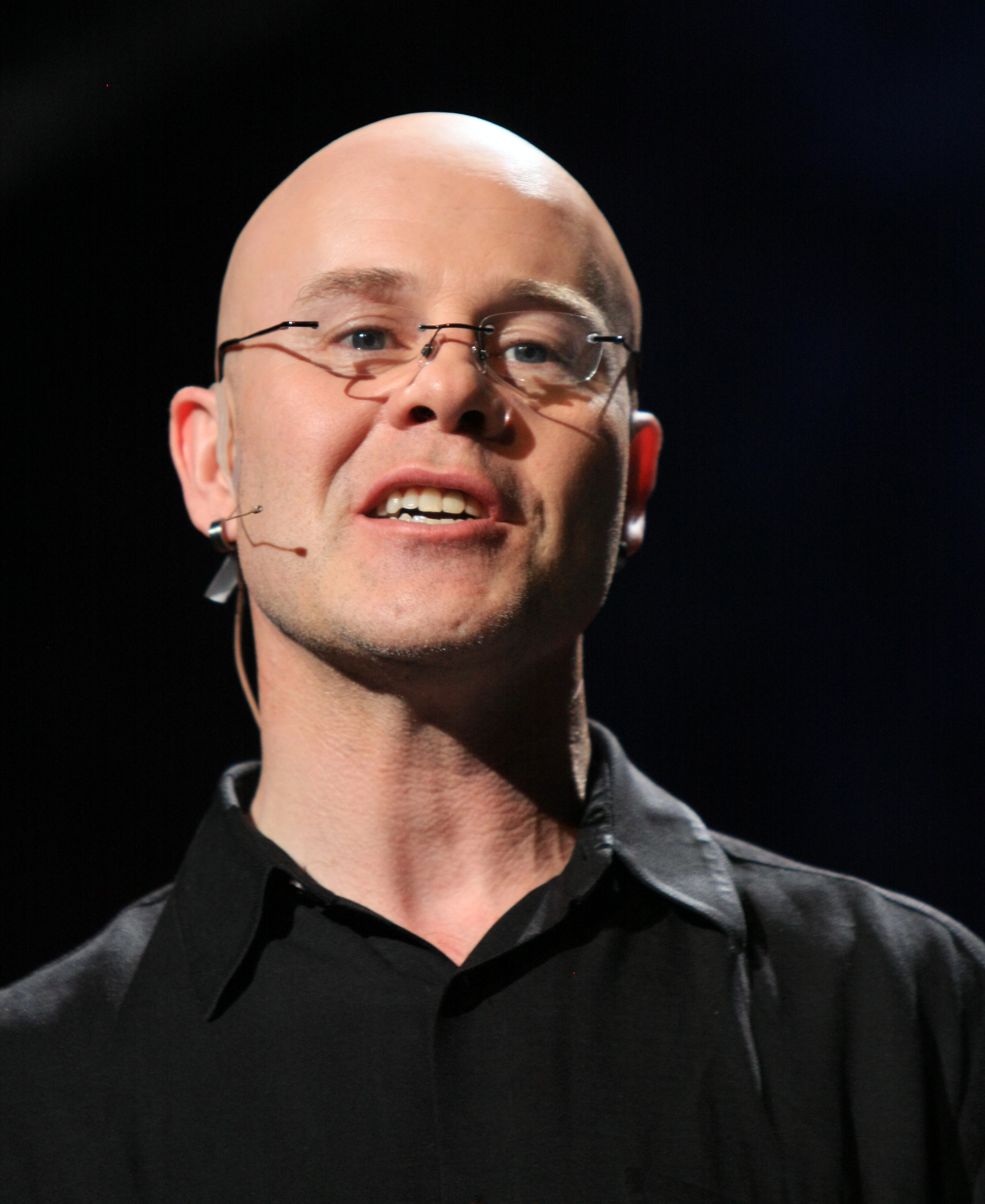
Dolby at TED in 2009

A CD plus DVD set entitled The Singular Thomas Dolby was released by EMI on 18 May 2009. As the name suggests it is a digitally remastered compilation of previously released singles. The DVD contains all the video singles that were available on the original VHS/BETA/LASERDISC release of The Golden Age of Video, as well as the videos for the songs "Silk Pyjamas", "I Love You Goodbye", and "Close but No Cigar". These three missing videos are for the singles taken from the 1992 album Astronauts & Heretics, which received critical acclaim but garnered unimpressive sales.

The Golden Age of Wireless and The Flat Earth were remastered and reissued later that year with numerous previously unreleased bonus tracks. The Golden Age of Wireless reissue was a two disc set including a DVD of the complete "Live Wireless" video.

=== A Map of the Floating City ===
In 2010 Dolby began work on a new studio album entitled A Map of the Floating City. The album is divided into three parts, with the first two parts initially made available to members of The Flat Earth Community Forum, Dolby's online community. Each of the three digital EPs takes its name from one of the three sections of the full-length album that later followed. The first EP, Amerikana, was released digitally on 16 June 2010. The second EP is entitled Oceanea, and was released on 29 November 2010. Due to favourable reviews and radio airplay, Oceanea was released commercially on 28 March 2011. The third section of the album, entitled Urbanoia, was not released as a download or physical CD, but the songs were premiered online as part of the Floating City game (see below).

Contributors to the album include Kevin Armstrong, Matthew Seligman (both had played together with him on The Flat Earth and as part of David Bowie's Live Aid appearance), Bruce Woolley, drummer Liam Genockey, guitarist Mark Knopfler of Dire Straits, Regina Spektor, Natalie MacMaster, Eddi Reader and Imogen Heap.

In a 2010 press release he was quoted as saying:

I marvel at the new landscape of the music business – distribution via the Internet and recording technologies I barely dreamed of when I started out," he continues. "But this album does not sound electronic at all. I have zero desire to add to the myriad of machine-based, synth-driven grooves out there. The Net has made a music career approachable for thousands of bands – but I hear too few single-minded voices among them. What I do best is write songs, tell stories." "The new songs are organic and very personal. This album is a travelogue across three imaginary continents. In Amerikana I'm reflecting with affection on the years I spent living in the USA, and my fascination with its roots music. Urbanoia is a dark place, a little unsettling ... I'm not a city person. And in Oceanea I return to my natural home on the windswept coastline.

A Map of the Floating City was recorded in the "Nutmeg of Consolation", Dolby's recording studio built within a 1930s lifeboat and powered entirely by renewable energy, which is located in the garden of Dolby's beach house on England's North Sea coast.

=== A Map of the Floating City game ===
In June 2011 Dolby announced the game A Map of the Floating City, a multiplayer online game that shares a title with the full-length album release planned to follow after the game's conclusion. In Dolby's own words, "The Floating City is set against a dystopian vision of the 1940s that might have existed had WWII turned out a lot differently." Survivors explore a fictional Google map, forming tribes and trading relics amidst a bizarre sea-going barter society. As they struggle to unravel the enigma that is The Floating City, players can haggle over merchandise and music downloads, including brand new songs from A Map of the Floating City, Dolby's first album in 20 years, scheduled to be released following the climax of the game. The game was played from June through August 2011, and included elements of trading, mystery, competition, and co-operation. Players earned free song downloads, and the winning team or "tribe" was awarded a private performance from Dolby.

== Session and production work ==
Parallel to his solo career, Dolby also worked as a session musician and record producer. He produced "Magic's Wand" from Whodini's self-titled album. He played on albums such as Thompson Twins album Set and Foreigner's 1981 album 4. Dolby worked as session keyboard player on Def Leppard's 1983 Pyromania album. Dolby appeared on Pyromania under the alias Booker T. Boffin.

In 1985, Dolby was a member of David Bowie's band for his performance at Live Aid. He also provided production on Joni Mitchell's album Dog Eat Dog. He had previously covered the Mitchell song "The Jungle Line" in 1981 after being inspired by her 1975 album The Hissing of Summer Lawns. He and Mitchell clashed in the studio, with Dolby's precise working methods proving incompatible with Mitchell's more freeform approach. Dolby wrote in his memoir that he was "probably too much of a brat, with my own blinkered way of working".

Dolby co-produced two songs on George Clinton's 1985 album Some of My Best Jokes Are Friends, after meeting Clinton backstage at Saturday Night Live and being invited to perform "Sex Machine" with P-Funk at a James Brown benefit concert. Dolby produced the albums Steve McQueen (1985) and Jordan: The Comeback (1990) by the English pop band Prefab Sprout. He also produced four tracks from 1988's From Langley Park to Memphis, including the hit single "The King of Rock 'n' Roll". In 1987, Dolby played synthesiser on Belinda Carlisle's "Heaven Is a Place on Earth", which reached number one on the US Billboard Hot 100 that December.

== Film and video games ==
Dolby has composed for a handful of films and video games. He also played the supporting role of Stanley—a parody of the character Van Helsing—in the 1990 comedy-musical film Rockula.

=== Scores for film and video games ===
==== Films ====
Year	Title	Notes
1985	Fever Pitch	
1986	Howard the Duck	songs
1986	Gothic	
1990	Rockula	"Stanley's Death Park" and "Budapest by Blimp"
1992	FernGully: The Last Rainforest	three songs
1992	Toys	vocals ("The Mirror Song"; with Robin Williams and Joan Cusack)
1993	We're Back! A Dinosaur's Story	"Roll Back The Rock" (with James Horner)
1994	The Gate to the Mind's Eye	
1994	Wolpodzilla	with Peter Horn and Tobias Neumann

==== Video games ====
Year	Title	Notes
1993	Double Switch	
1994	Cyberia	with Mike Kapitan
1995	The Dark Eye	with Chuck Mitchell and Blake Leyh
1997	Obsidian	with Blake Leyh, Kim Cascone, and Paul Sebastien

=== The Invisible Lighthouse ===
In 2012, Dolby learned of the decommissioning of the Orfordness Lighthouse near his Suffolk home, and proceeded to film a documentary, The Invisible Lighthouse, to chronicle the shutdown of the lighthouse as well as his childhood growing up in the area. Dolby took this film on the road through the US and UK in the Autumn of 2013, accompanying the film with live music, narration, and sound effects by Blake Leyh. The film won the DIY Film Festival award for Best Picture.

== Headspace and Beatnik ==
In 1993, Dolby established the Headspace company. This was intended to provide tools for interactive audio, as at the time Dolby was frustrated about the lack of interactive audio tools. During this period, Dolby worked on a number of video game soundtracks through his company. The company was later approached to create MIDI-based music for WebTV, leading to Dolby composing several key music tracks that were bundled with the devices.

Following the acquisition of the company Igor's Software Laboratories in 1996, which was also involved with creating audio for WebTV, Headspace developed a new downloadable file format designed specifically for Internet usage called Rich Music Format with the RMF file extension. It had the advantage of small file size like MIDI but allowed recorded sampled sounds to be included at a higher bitrate for better overall reproduction. RMF music files could be played in a browser using the free Beatnik Player plug-in, and were also encrypted to prevent unauthorised duplication, while info such as the composer and copyright information could also be embedded within the files. In 1999, Headspace, Inc., was renamed Beatnik, Inc., and later shifted its focus towards software synthesizers for mobile phones, which it licensed to mobile phone manufacturers including Nokia. As truetone ringtones eventually overtook polyphonic ringtones in popularity, Beatnik went defunct in 2011.

Dolby stepped down from his position as CEO in 2002, feeling that the business was no longer interesting to him, although he remained on the board. This subsequently led to him founding Retro Ringtones LLC, which produced the RetroFolio ringtone asset management software suite for companies involved in the mobile phone ringtone business, as well as offering ringtones that could be purchased by businesses. These ringtones largely consisted of sound clips such as animal sounds, celebrity quotes and sci-fi sound effects, as well as polyphonic covers of popular theme songs. At the 2004 second annual Mobile Music Awards in Miami, Florida, RetroFolio won "Best of Show" and "Best New Technology" awards. The company ended business in 2005 and has since been suspended by the Secretary of State of California.

Dolby created hundreds of digital polyphonic ringtones on mobile phones, both at Beatnik and Retro Ringtones. He was often a speaker at technology conferences such as Comdex, Websphere, and Nokia.

== Other endeavours ==
=== Virtual reality ===
Dolby's first experiment with virtual reality took place in the fall of 1992, when he was invited by the Guggenheim Museum, New York, to design and install a sonic VR experience. This led to The Virtual String Quartet programmed by Eric Gullichsen, and sponsored by Intel Corp. The experience ran on an IBM 386 processor with a Convolvatron 4-channel audio card. Users wore a head-mounted display and found themselves in the midst of a computer-generated string quartet playing Mozart. The sound was fully spatialized as the user moved around the physical space. Tickling a player with the joystick resulted in that musician switching to improvisation in a 'hot jazz' or Appalachian bluegrass style.

In the fall of 2018, Dolby created a New Media workshop at The Peabody Institute of Johns Hopkins University with VR equipment donated by HTC Vive. Students in his course are learning to compose music for VR and AR.

On 4 October 2018, Dolby performed a live score for the High Fidelity VR event 'Escape from Zombie Island.' He appeared 'in-world' as his own avatar, where he triggered and played real-time horror film music. He also performed his first ever full VR concert at the Futvrelands Festival on 17 November 2018, in front of over 250 other avatars.

=== TED Conference ===
From 2001 to 2012, Dolby was musical director of the TED Conference, an annual event held, first, in Monterey, California, and subsequently in Long Beach, California. He provided live musical introductions to sessions, sometimes with a TED house band, and helped secure guest musicians and entertainers. Onstage, he played with singers and performers such as Eddi Reader, Natalie MacMaster, Rachelle Garniez and David Byrne, and premiered his own song "Love Is a Loaded Pistol" onstage at TEDGlobal 2010. He stood down from the position in September 2012 to pursue music.

In March 2012, at the McEnery Convention Center in San Jose, California, Dolby spoke at the DESIGN West conference, produced by UBM Electronics.

=== Academic career ===
In March 2014, Dolby was named Homewood Professor of the Arts at Baltimore's Johns Hopkins University. In March 2017, the Peabody Institute announced that Dolby would lead a new four-year undergraduate degree program, Music for New Media, and the first cohort would commence in the fall of 2018.

== Equipment ==
Dolby said he became interested in electronic music because "I'm not a very proficient keyboard player, so the computer became my musical instrument ... None of the equipment is essential, though. In a way, I was happier when I just had one monophonic synthesizer and a two-track tape deck". His first instrument, found in EMS's garbage dumpster at 277 Putney Bridge Road, was the Powertran Transcendent 2000 synthesiser.

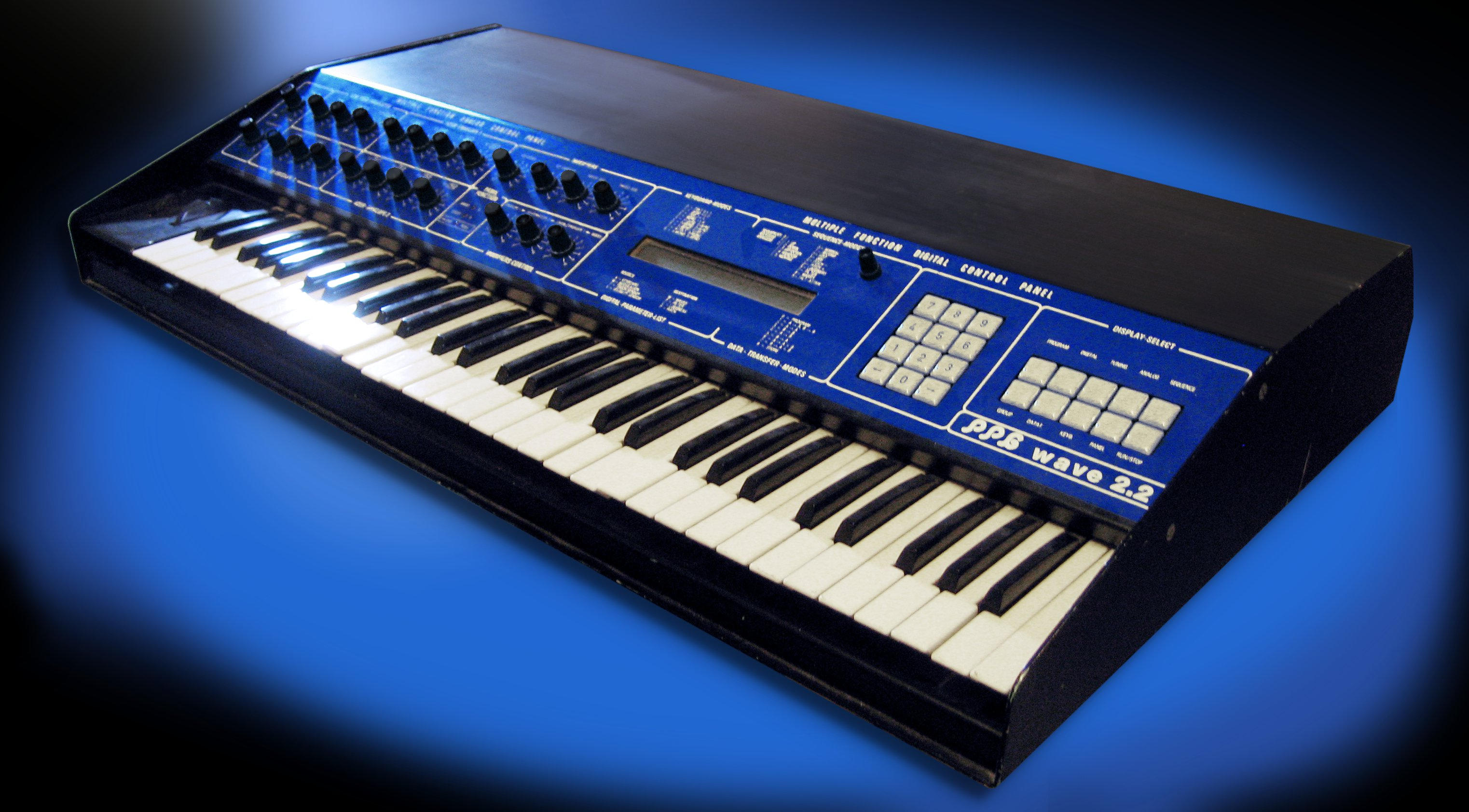
PPG WAVE 2.2

The following is a list of notable instruments and the electronic equipment that Dolby has used on his recordings:

- PPG 340/380 Wave Computer & Sequencer
- PPG Wave 2.2 synthesizer
- Fairlight CMI Series III sampler
- Moog Micromoog synthesizer
- Roland D-50 synthesizer
- Roland MKS-20 digital piano rack
- Roland MKS-70 Super JX rackmount synthesizer
- Opcode Studio Vision sequencing software
- Apple Macintosh Quadra 840AV computer
- Roland Jupiter-4
- Roland Jupiter-8
- Korg M1 rackmount synthesizer
- E-MU SP-12 sampling drum sequencer
- Linn 9000 sampling drum sequencer
- Simmons SDSV electronic drums
- Yamaha DX7
- Yamaha REV-1 digital reverb processor

== Personal life ==
Dolby married actress Kathleen Beller in 1988; they have three children. His brother is the probabilistic information retrieval researcher Stephen Robertson.

== Awards and nominations ==
In July 1998, Dolby received a "Lifetime Achievement in Internet Music" award from Yahoo! Internet Life. In 2012 he performed at Moogfest and was the recipient of The Moog Innovation Award, which celebrates "pioneering artists whose genre-defying work exemplifies the bold, innovative spirit of Bob Moog". In February 2018, Dolby was awarded the Roland Lifetime Achievement Award. Dolby has received four Grammy nominations, two each in 1984 and 1988.

== Discography ==
- The Golden Age of Wireless (1982)
- The Flat Earth (1984)
- Aliens Ate My Buick (1988)
- Astronauts & Heretics (1992)
- A Map of the Floating City (2011)

== Bibliography ==
- The Speed of Sound: Breaking the Barriers Between Music and Technology (2016)
- Prevailing Wind (2024)

== See also ==
- List of Old Abingdonians
