= My Brain Is Like a Sieve =

1989 single by Thomas Dolby

Single by Thomas Dolby

from the album Aliens Ate My Buick
- B-side: "My Brain Is Like a Sieve" (instrumental)
- Released: 29 August 1989
- Length: 4:52 (album version); 3:59 (single version)
- Label: EMI USA
- Songwriter: Thomas Dolby
- Producers: Thomas Dolby; Bill Bottrell

Thomas Dolby singles chronology
| "Hot Sauce" (1988) | "My Brain Is Like a Sieve" (1989) | "Close but No Cigar" (1992) |

Audio
- "My Brain Is Like a Sieve" on YouTube

"My Brain Is Like a Sieve" is a song by the English singer and musician Thomas Dolby, released by EMI USA on 29 August 1989 as the third and final single from his third album, Aliens Ate My Buick (1988). The song was written by Dolby, and was produced by Dolby and Bill Bottrell.

== Background ==
Dolby has described "My Brain Is Like a Sieve" as "a song about my ex-girlfriend in Sheffield". The lyrics concern a man who has been hurt by an ex-lover and wishes he could forget their relationship. The song was Dolby's first attempt at a reggae-styled tune. He told Musician in 1989, "I tend to lock onto a specific style of groove fairly early and work with the conventions within that. Triplet echoes are something that obviously go with that upbeat reggae kind of lilt. So when I get an environment to work in, elements will come up and propel me to a certain style of singing."

Dolby used a combination of sequenced and live drums when recording the track. He has also said that the sampled vocal of the word "murder", spoken by American actor Ed Asner, came from the idea of "using a '50s cop-show voice for that toasting yelp in reggae".

== Release ==
"My Brain Is Like a Sieve" was released in the UK on 7-inch, 12-inch and CD formats on 29 August 1989. For its release as a single, 16 months after the release of its parent album, Aliens Ate My Buick, "My Brain Is Like a Sieve" was remixed by co-producer Bill Bottrell. The picture sleeve features a photograph of Dolby with a snake draped over his head. Dolby chose the concept for the sleeve to raise awareness about the threats faced by rainforests.

== Critical reception ==
Upon its release as a single, pan-European magazine Music & Media wrote, "The British sound magician has delivered a smooth, slow-stepping pop song. A hit." David Giles of Music Week noted the long gap between the release of Aliens Ate My Buick and the single, but added it was "well worth recharging for its superb melody recalling Bowie at his Seventies best, boosted by a souped-up white reggae rhythm". David Ford of the Telegraph & Argus praised it as a "lilting electronic calypso groove" and Andrew Hirst of the Huddersfield Daily Examiner called it a "pretty little ditty".

Vanessa Williams, as guest reviewer for Number One considered the song to have a "clever title", but felt it "sounds more like an album track than a single". Chris Giles, writing for the Dorset Evening Echo, also noted the "great title" but was "not too sure about the song". He continued, "It's not too bad; in fact it's quite infectious. However, I think he should stick to producing!" Robin Smith of Record Mirror wrote, "Tom enthusiastically drips emotion all over the place, but somehow you think that when he goes up into the bedroom and closes the door he laughs his head off. This single really doesn't offer much apart from curiosity value."

Marcus Hodge of the Cambridge Evening News was unfavourable in his review, writing, "Thomas tries to decorate a very ordinary song with clever production techniques, but fails to do anything except drag it all out. He has got his own charm but he rarely channels it to his singles." In a retrospective assessment, Classic Pop noted the song's "immaculate sophisti-pop credentials" and stated that, as a single, it "transcended its faux-reggae arrangement to become a superb, rather downbeat song in the Prefab style".

== Track listings ==
7–inch single (UK)

1. "My Brain Is Like a Sieve" – 3:59
2. "My Brain Is Like a Sieve" (instrumental) – 4:49

12–inch single (UK)

1. "My Brain Is Like a Sieve" (extended mix) – 5:37
2. "My Brain Is Like a Sieve" (instrumental) – 4:49
3. "Ravivar Fiore" – 1:16

CD single (UK)

1. "My Brain Is Like a Sieve" – 3:59
2. "My Brain Is Like a Sieve" (instrumental) – 4:49
3. "Ravivar Fiore" – 1:16

== Personnel ==
"My Brain Is Like a Sieve"

- Thomas Dolby – vocals, keyboards
- Larry Treadwell – guitar
- Mike Kapitan – synthesizer
- Terry Jackson – bass
- David Owens – drums
- Laura Creamer – backing vocals

Production

- Thomas Dolby – production ("My Brain Is Like a Sieve", "Ravivar Fiore")
- Bill Bottrell – production, engineering and remixing ("My Brain Is Like a Sieve")

Other

- Abrahams Pants – design
- Shelly Gazin – photography
