= I Love You Goodbye =

Single by Thomas Dolby

from the album Astronauts & Heretics
- Released: 29 June 1992
- Genre: Cajun Techno, New wave
- Length: 5:59 (album version); 4:35 (edited version)
- Label: Virgin
- Songwriter: Thomas Dolby
- Producer: Thomas Dolby

Thomas Dolby singles chronology
| "Close but No Cigar" (1992) | "I Love You Goodbye" (1992) | "Silk Pyjamas" (1992) |

"I Love You Goodbye" is a song by English singer and musician Thomas Dolby, released by Virgin Records on 29 June 1992 as the second single from his fourth studio album, Astronauts & Heretics (1992). The song, which was written and produced by Dolby, reached number 36 on the UK Singles Chart.

== Writing ==
Done in the style of a "Cajun Techno", the song was explained by Dolby on his live album Forty: Live Limited Edition to be a semi-autobiographical narrative based on his experience of a road trip near New Orleans. During recording sessions for the album in Louisiana, Dolby and some other musicians were driving in a rental car when they were stopped by a patrolman. In the song, the narrator decides to go bowling on a Friday morning, he and a friend drive toward the Everglades in a stolen Datsun; they are arrested after crashing the car in a rainstorm, but the county sheriff offers to let them go in exchange for a bribe as long as they get rid of the car in the Gulf of Mexico.

== Music video ==
The song's accompanying music video was directed by Jonathan Teplitzky and produced by Jim Gabour. It was shot on location in the bayous outside New Orleans.

== Critical reception ==
Upon its release, Alan Jones wrote in Music Week that the single was a "strange, eclectic piece with folksy violins, doodling synths and much more". He called the song a "quality single" and predicted that it would not surpass the level of success attained by Dolby's previous single, "Close but No Cigar". Larry Flick of the US magazine Billboard noted that Dolby's "poised and polished vocals slide over a pleasant hodgepodge of synthesized sounds and percussion". He continued that it was "notable especially for managing to experiment without sacrificing its easy grace" and "should sound fine on pop-leaning AC formats".

== Track listings ==
- 7–inch and cassette single (UK)
1. "I Love You Goodbye" (edited version) – 4:35
2. "Eastern Bloc" (Sequel to Europa & the Pirate Twins, 1981) (edited version) – 4:13
- CD limited-edition single #1 (UK)
1. "I Love You Goodbye" (edited version) – 4:35
2. "Eastern Bloc" (The Sequel) (edited version) – 4:13
3. "I Love You Goodbye" (version) – 4:19
4. "Eastern Bloc" (version) – 4:18
- CD limited-edition single #2 (UK)
1. "I Love You Goodbye" – 5:58
2. "Windpower" – 3:54
3. "Europa and the Pirate Twins" – 3:21
4. "Eastern Bloc" – 4:13
- CD promotional single (US)
1. "I Love You Goodbye" (edit) – 3:56
2. "That's Why People Fall in Love" (edit) – 4:09
3. "I Love You Goodbye" (album version) – 5:57
4. "That's Why People Fall in Love" (album version) – 5:29
- CD promotional single #2 (US)
1. "I Love You Goodbye" (Bayou Mix) – 4:18
2. "I Love You Goodbye" (New Orleans Mix) – 4:33
3. "I Love You Goodbye" (album version) – 5:57

== Personnel ==
"I Love You Goodbye"

- Thomas Dolby – vocals, piano, keyboards
- Larry Treadwell – guitar
- Terry Jackson – bass
- Wayne Toups – Cajun accordion, backing vocals
- Michael Doucet – Cajun fiddle, backing vocals
- Al Tharp – Cajun banjo, backing vocals
- Suzanne Malline – backing vocals
- Cynthia Moliere – backing vocals
- Teresita Alsander – backing vocals

Production

- Thomas Dolby – production

Other

- Larry Vigon – art direction, design
- Brian Jackson – design
- Michael Terranova – photography

== Charts ==
| Chart (1992) | Peak position |
|---|---|
| Australia (ARIA) | 155 |
| UK Singles (OCC) | 36 |
| UK Airplay (Music Week) | 29 |
