= Hyperactive! =

1984 single by Thomas Dolby

Single by Thomas Dolby

from the album The Flat Earth
- B-side: "White City" (UK), "Get Out of My Mix (Special Dance Version)" (US)
- Released: 9 January 1984; 10 January 1994 (re-release)
- Recorded: 1983
- Genre: Synth-pop; new wave
- Length: 4:46
- Label: EMI; Capitol
- Songwriter: Thomas Dolby
- Producer: Thomas Dolby

Thomas Dolby singles chronology
"Get Out of My Mix" (1983)	"Hyperactive!" (1984)	"I Scare Myself" (1984)

Music video
- "Hyperactive!" on YouTube

"Hyperactive!" is a song by the English new wave and synth-pop musician Thomas Dolby, released on 9 January 1984 by EMI and Capitol Records as the lead single from his second studio album The Flat Earth. Backing vocals were provided by the American singer Adele Bertei.

According to Dolby, he initially composed the song for Michael Jackson, whom he had met in 1982. He decided to record it himself since he never got any feedback from Jackson after sending him a demo tape. Dolby felt that "Hyperactive" deviated from the remaining material on The Flat Earth, which he described as a "late night album" and "smoochy".

It was the first single to be taken from the album and peaked at number 17 on the UK singles chart and number 16 on the Canadian RPM charts, In the US, it reached number 62 on the US Billboard Hot 100 and also charted on the publication's Dance Club Songs listing.

== Music video ==
A music video was also released on MTV in February 1984, where it later received medium rotation. Cashbox noted the video's "hilarious special effects gimmickry in its take-off on psychiatry." Dolby coordinated with Daniel Kleinman on the music video, who served as the director. Later that year, it was nominated for the Best Computer Graphics and Most Innovative Music Video categories for the Billboard's Video Music Awards. It was also nominated under the Best Pop Video category for the American Video Awards.

== Critical reception ==
Upon its release, Martyn Ware, as guest reviewer for Smash Hits, praised "Hyperactive!" as "another brilliantly-produced single from Thomas" with a "high originality factor". He added that it "deserves to be a success", but said that the lack of an "identifiable chorus" could impact its chart success. Karen Swayne of Number One considered it a "winner" and an "unexpected treat". She summarised, "It's a furiously fast blast of choppy funk with some fearsome girl vocals [in the chorus]." Lemmy, as guest reviewer for Record Mirror, called the song "a bit disjointed for me", but thought that it had a "great sound".

In the US, Cashbox called the song "a nervous, audio leap-frog of a single which more than achieves the mood hinted at by the title." Billboard characterized the song as "electronic dance pop".

== Personnel ==
- Thomas Dolby – keyboards, vocals
- Adele Bertei – additional vocals
- Louise Ulfstedt – "The Analyst"
- Kevin Armstrong – guitar, "The Analyst"
- Matthew Seligman – bass guitar
- Justin Hildreth – drums
- Matthew Salt – tins, thunder sheet
- Clif Brigden – percussion, computer drums
- Peter Thoms – trombone

== Chart positions ==
Chart (1984)	Peak position
Australia (Kent Music Report)	26
Canada RPM Top Singles	16
New Zealand (RIANZ)	41
UK singles chart	17
US Billboard Hot 100	62
US Billboard Album Rock Tracks	39
US Billboard Dance/Disco Top 80	37
