= Peter Haigh =

British television presenter (1925–2001)

- Born: July 28, 1925; London, England
- Died: January 18, 2001 (aged 75); Haverfordwest, Wales
- Education: Aldenham School
- Occupation(s): Television and radio presenter
- Years active: 1952-1987
- Employers: BBC; ITV; British Forces Broadcasting Service; Radio Luxembourg
- Notable credits: Picture Parade; Come Dancing; Viewclues; Laughline; Beat Your Neighbour; Simon and Laura; Band of Thieves; Live It Up; Witchfinder General
- Spouses: Jill Adams (m. 1957; div. 1976); Inge Drake (m. 1984)
- Children: 1

Peter Varley Haigh (28 July 1925 – 18 January 2001) was an English broadcaster and in-vision continuity announcer for BBC Television in the years after the Second World War. After being commissioned into the fifth battalion of the Welsh Guards in 1944, he joined the British Forces Broadcasting Service (BFBS) as a producer and announcer in Jerusalem and Benghazi. Haigh began working for BBC Television as an announcer in 1952 and was part of the team of continuity announcers headed by McDonald Hobley, Mary Malcolm and Sylvia Peters. He compèred several programmes on a freelance basis for the BBC and the ITV network, including the weekly film programme review Picture Parade and Come Dancing.

== Early life ==
Haigh was born in North London on 28 July 1925, the only son of the engineer William Varley Haigh. He was brought up in North London, and was educated at Aldenham School, Aldenham, Hertfordshire. After leaving school, Haigh was unsure as to what career he wanted to pursue as he mulled over studying art or going into advertising.

Haigh was commissioned in 1944 into the fifth battalion of the Welsh Guards, rising to the rank of Captain. He served in Palestine and Egypt. He joined the British Forces Broadcasting Service (BFBS) in Jerusalem and Benghazi as a producer and announcer after a meeting with the head of overseas broadcasting Leslie Knight. He later helped start up the BBC Overseas News station in Mombasa, Kenya.

== Broadcasting career ==
Following his leaving the army in 1947, he failed to get a job as a BBC Radio announcer on numerous occasions. Haigh was told that his voice was "too nasal", attributed to him having a cold he was suffering from during his audition as well as being "too Oxford" despite not having attended the University of Oxford. In the interim, he spent some time on a tobacco plantation in India and worked as a commercial artist, commercial traveller, film salesman in the North of England, tiling roofs for a firm of tile manufacturers in the East End of London, and a part-time postman in Britain. After four attempts, he successfully joined BBC Television as an announcer on 17 March 1952 after a two-week trial at Alexandra Palace, then the headquarters of BBC Television. Haigh was a stand-in guest announcer for McDonald Hobley, who was on holiday. He joined the team of continuity announcers headed by Hobley, Mary Malcolm and Sylvia Peters.

Haigh compèred programmes on Radio Luxembourg and commented on a film newsreel. In 1955, Haigh introduced the television crossword puzzle show Viewclues that featured music and pictures, the topical magazine programme Now, two episodes of Top Town. and inclement weather survey Fine Weather for Ducks. He played a father in the children's television panel series Ask Your Dad. After Hobley left the BBC for ITV in 1956, Haigh was offered Hobley's former job as chief staff announcer. He refused on the grounds that it did not provide him with enough artistical and financial opportunities, and that he would not be able to continue working as a freelancer for commercial companies. Haigh also noticed that the era of in-vision announcers would be over after ITV broadcast commercials and trailers.

He visited Chester to meet with its residents in an episode of Home Town in 1956, and he chaired My Wildest Dream. That same year also saw Haigh begin presenting the weekly film review programme Picture Parade with Derek Bond co-presenting on occasion until 1962. He went on to chair the show This is Show Business in which he also acted as an interviewer and announcer, introduced three American musicians in Into Thin Air, and was the compère of the BBC Light Programme survey Movie-Go-Round. Haigh presented Come Dancing In 1958, and provided the BBC commentary for the Eurovision Song Contest, staged that year in Hilversum, Netherlands.

In 1961, he was chair of the panel show Laughline. as well as the Southern Television knock-out quiz elimination programme Beat Your Neighbour between 1961 and 1963. He also provided the BBC radio commentary for the Eurovision Song Contest 1962. Haigh narrated the animated film The Commonwealth (1962) and had roles in the films in Simon and Laura (1955), Band of Thieves (1962), Live It Up (1963) and as a magistrate in Witchfinder General (1968). From the early 1970s, he lived in Portugal running a restaurant and bar popular with British tourists. Haigh returned to Britain in the 1980s but he was unable to resume his broadcasting career, having a brief stint of BBC Radio WM in 1985, presenting a series about the West Midlands during the Second World War. He made a final television appearance as guest of Des Lynam on a short-lived series called It's My Pleasure. Haigh later worked occasionally for BBC radio and did voice-overs for advertisements.

== Personal life ==
Haigh married the actress Jill Adams at Newport Register Office on the Isle of Wight on 27 April 1957. There was one child of the first marriage. They divorced in 1976. In January 1968, he was fined £10 following his plea of guilty for sending indecent cards and a brochure through the post. Haigh remarried for the second time to the German-born Inge Drake at Stratford Register Office on 12 December 1984. He died on 18 January 2001.

== Awards ==
Haigh was named Best Commentator of the Year in 1956, and BBC Sound Radio Personality of the Year by the Variety Club of Great Britain in 1966.

Preceded by Berkeley Smith	Eurovision Song Contest UK Commentator; 1958	Succeeded by Tom Sloan
