= Keith Dudley Ulysses Rogers =

British radio, radar and television pioneer

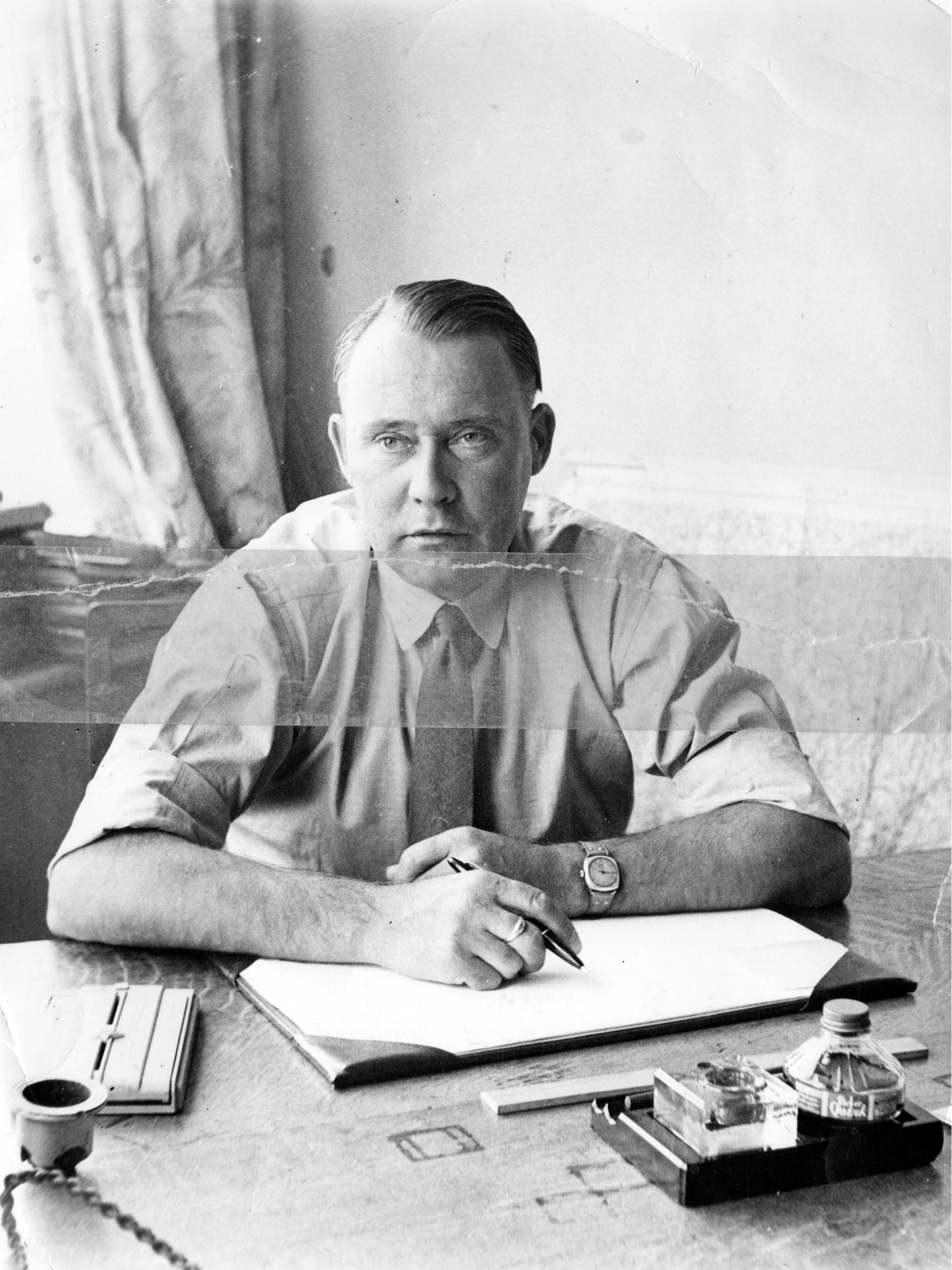
- Rogers at his desk in Alexandra Palace, 1947
- Born: Keith Dudley Ulysses Rogers; 27 January 1900; Crouch End, England, UK
- Died: 9 February 1974 (aged 74); Cuckfield, Sussex
- Resting place: Cuckfield, Sussex
- Education: Mill Hill School
- Occupation: Television executive
- Employer(s): BBC Television, ATV
- Known for: Early outside broadcasts including of the Festival of Britain, Coronation of Queen Elizabeth II and many early episodes of Tonight at the London Palladium

Keith Dudley Ulysses Rogers OBE (27 January 1900 – 9 February 1974) was a British radio, radar and television pioneer. He was a senior television production executive for outside broadcasting with the BBC (1946–1955) and subsequently ATV until his retirement in 1970.

== Early life and career ==
Born in Crouch End, Greater London, to Daniel Ulysses Rogers (a tennis reporter for the Daily Express) and Minnie Gertrude Thomas, Rogers attended Lindisfarne College and Mill Hill School. On 14 July 1917 he matriculated as a student in the University of London in the second division, having satisfied the examiners in English, Mathematics, Chemistry, Heat, Light and Sound, and French.

== First World War ==
On 28 December 1917, Rogers was posted to the British Merchant Navy as a radio operator with the Marconi International Marine Communication Company Limited. He served one voyage on MV SILVERSAND (18 December 1917 – 19 March 1918, Newport–Spezia–Newport), a 2500 gross tonnage Admiralty collier transport, before being transferred to the LUTETIAN (5 May 1918 – 2 December 1918) for four transatlantic voyages. In November 1918, a week before the Armistice of 11 November 1918, he and several of the crew caught the Spanish flu during their final stopover in New York. Following demobilisation on 2 December 1918, Rogers attended University College London to study chemistry, gaining a 3rd Class Certificate in Organic Chemistry (General Course) in the 1920–1921 academic year.

== Popular Wireless ==
Rogers rose to become Chief of the Research Department of the Popular Wireless and Wireless Review magazines, both working and reporting on advances in radio and, later, television circuitry. In December 1924 he and George Victor Dowding patented the Unidyne (Solodyne) Valve, an early forerunner of the "Hiker Set" that removed the need for "B" batteries. In January 1926, he visited and interviewed John Logie Baird at Frith Street, witnessing a demonstration of the Baird apparatus. In 1935, he became a Fellow of the Royal Television Society and, in the same year, a contributing author in Dowding's Book of Practical Television. After leaving Popular Wireless in 1935, he became a freelance journalist specializing in scientific and sociological articles.

== Second World War ==
At the outbreak of the war, Rogers joined No. 60 Group RAF of the Royal Air Force. Initially trained at No. 1 Radio School in the design, installation and maintenance of the MB2 early warning radar system and posted on 30 March 1941 to the West Prawle Chain Home Low station, he was recalled in October 1941 to No. 60 Group headquarters at Oxenden House/The Heath in Leighton Buzzard where he served for the remainder of the war, rising to the rank of Squadron Leader before his demobilisation on 21 September 1945.

== Broadcast television career ==
=== British Broadcasting Corporation ===
After a year of working with the Marconi Research Department, Rogers joined the BBC in May 1946. He was involved in the production, direction, and presentation of at least 132 broadcast programmes for the BBC between February 1947 and April 1955, many with Richard Dimbleby (affectionately nicknamed 'Bumblepuppy'), Peter Dimmock, Raymond Baxter or Sylvia Peters in front of the camera. These included many of the significant early live outside broadcast events: the 1948 London Olympics, the first live outside broadcast of an entire opera in May 1948, the first live trans-channel broadcast from Calais in August 1950, the live collaborative relay from Paris in July 1952, and major outside broadcasts from the 1951 Festival of Britain. In 1954, after his production role on 2 June 1953 for the outside broadcast of the coronation of Elizabeth II, he was advised that he would in future be the producer in charge of all Royal occasions and the main contact with the Palace for these events.

Photograph of two BBC internal memos received by Rogers thanking him for his involvement in the outside broadcasting of the 1948 Olympics and 1953 Coronation of Queen Elizabeth II

=== ATV ===
Headhunted from the BBC by Lew Grade in 1955, Rogers worked alongside Bill Ward, Frank Beale, and Terence MacNamara to help establish outside broadcasting capability for the startup of ATV, with Rogers producing the boxing match segment of the 22 September opening night broadcast schedule from Shoreditch Town Hall. He eventually became Head of Presentation at ATV and was awarded the Order of the British Empire in the 1966 New Year Honours List.

== Personal life ==
Rogers married Gladys Winifred Evans in 1930. He died in Cuckfield, Sussex on 9 February 1974. They had one son, Dr Keith Llewellyn Rogers, who became medical director of the South Thames Blood Transfusion Centre 1970–1991.
