= Lesley Welch =

Lesley Welch may refer to:

- Lesley Lehane, athlete
- Leslie Welch, entertainer
