= Simon and Laura =

1955 British film by Muriel Box

- Film poster
- Directed by: Muriel Box
- Screenplay by: Peter Blackmore
- Based on: Simon and Laura, a 1954 play by Alan Melville
- Produced by: Teddy Baird
- Starring: Kay Kendall; Peter Finch; Muriel Pavlow; Hubert Gregg; Maurice Denham; Ian Carmichael
- Cinematography: Ernest Steward
- Edited by: Jean Barker
- Music by: Benjamin Frankel
- Color process: Colour by Technicolor
- Production company: Group Film Productions Limited
- Distributed by: J. Arthur Rank Film Distributors
- Release date: 22 November 1955 (London)
- Running time: 91 minutes
- Country: United Kingdom
- Language: English

Simon and Laura is a 1955 British comedy film directed by Muriel Box and starring Peter Finch and Kay Kendall.

== Play ==
Satirising the early days of BBC Television, Simon and Laura focuses on an argumentative theatrical couple called Simon and Laura Foster; they've been together for some 20 years and are given a new lease of life when playing a faux-harmonious version of 'themselves' in a daily soap opera filmed in their own home. Presented by H M Tennent Ltd, the play began a provincial tour at the Opera House Manchester on 30 August 1954, subsequently opening at the Strand Theatre in London's West End on 25 November. Directed by Murray Macdonald, it starred Roland Culver, Coral Browne, Ian Carmichael, Dora Bryan, Ernest Thesiger and Esma Cannon, with settings designed by Alan Tagg.

According to Frances Stephens, editor of Theatre World, "Simon and Laura has as its amusing central theme the guying of television family serials and the author is well served by the very talented cast." "We have often been taken, with sufficiently comic results, behind the scenes in the playhouse and film studio", noted The Stage, "but it has remained for Mr Melville to exploit television, the latest form of entertainment. He does it very well, though most of the characters are absurd rather than human as we know humanity in the auditorium. The dialogue abounds in lines that arouse an involuntary chuckle or laugh; the situations, if occasionally laboured, are ingenious and hilarious." The play's centerpiece – when the filming of the soap's 200th edition goes disastrously wrong – was referred to as a "glorious free-for-all rumpus before the cameras."

Other estimates were less enthusiastic. "The comedy", claimed The Times, "is not, taken as a whole, a particularly good one, but there are a great many quips which will come home to the business and bosoms of [television] viewers." Kenneth Tynan, in The Observer, concluded that "As a mechanical tilt at television, the play is acceptable, though the plot is a rattle of dry bones." Despite these critiques, the play was a success; it moved to the Apollo Theatre on 14 February 1955 and was seen by HM Queen Elizabeth on 24 March. In all it ran for six months, closing on 28 May.

The play went out on tour again in the UK from July. At the same time, husband-and-wife team John McCallum and Googie Withers toured it with great success in Australia, playing it in repertory with the Terence Rattigan drama The Deep Blue Sea.

=== Cast ===
- Peter Finch as Simon Foster
- Kay Kendall as Laura Foster
- Muriel Pavlow as Janet Honeyman
- Hubert Gregg as Bertie Burton
- Maurice Denham as Wilson
- Ian Carmichael as David Prentice
- Richard Wattis as Controller of Television Drama
- Thora Hird as Jessie
- Terence Longdon as Barney
- Clive Parritt as Timothy
- Alan Wheatley as Adrian Lee
- Beverley Brooks as Mabel
- Tom Gill as TV producer
- Nicholas Parsons as TV producer
- David Morrell as TV producer
- Joan Hickson as barmaid
- Charles Hawtrey as railway porter
- Cyril Chamberlain as Bert
- Philip Gilbert as Joe
- Julia Arnall as make-up girl (Miss Mills)
- Gilbert Harding as himself
- Isobel Barnett as herself
- Peter Haigh as himself
- George Cansdale as himself

=== Production ===
It was Finch's first leading role in a British film.

Melville's original was adapted by Peter Blackmore, author of the successful play and film Miranda. With Finch and Kendall in the leads, the titular couple became significantly younger (though dialogue referring to them as theatrical veterans remained). Their agent, a German-accented character called Wolfstein in the play, became a very English one called Bertie Burton; their Canadian scriptwriter, Janet Honeyman, became plain English too. Where the play made reference to such celebrities of the day as film magnate Sir Alexander Korda, actors Peter Cushing and Michael Wilding and comedian Wee Georgie Wood, the film was able to incorporate appearances by TV personalities Gilbert Harding, Isobel Barnett, Peter Haigh and George Cansdale.

The film version went into production at Pinewood in the first week of June 1955, immediately after the play's closure at the Apollo. It opened at the Gaumont Haymarket on 24 November (on a bill with On Such a Night), with general release following on 26 December.

Muriel Box saw Ian Carmichael play his role on stage "and I thought he would be wonderful in the film, so I insisted on having him even though Rank didn’t want him. They wanted a more established 'star' name. I knew the cast I wanted – Kay Kendall, Peter Finch and Thora Hird. Normally the casting is left to the director but Rank had no hesitation in saying if they disagreed with you. But, with Ian Carmichael, I really dug in my heels because I knew he would be excellent in the part."

Early in filming Peter Finch and Kay Kendall watched rushes and asked Rank's head of production Earl St John that Muriel Box be replaced. After discussions it was decided that Box should stay on the film if she allowed them to take a more improvisational approach, although she did not have a strong rapport with her stars.

=== Reception ===
"Simon and Laura takes to the screen as a duck to water", announced The Times. "Its satire and sophistication make a welcome change", claimed Virginia Graham in The Spectator, "and I can heartily recommend it." "This Pinewood comedy is full of good jokes at Lime Grove's expense", added The Star, while the Daily Worker called it "A most efficient exercise in what is now the time-honoured film sport of television baiting." In the News of the World Peter Burnup observed that "Simon and Laura may not turn out to be another Genevieve or Doctor in the House but all the same it has plenty of elegance and high spirits", adding, "I have no doubt the BBC will survive the good-humoured leg-pull."

Filmink called Finch's performance "a career low".

== Television versions ==
Melville's TV satire appeared on Danish television (Simon og Laura) in December 1955, Swedish television (Simon och Laura) in February 1960, and Finnish television (Simon ja Laura) in November 1960. Then, almost ten years to the day since its West End premiere, it made it to British TV, via the recently inaugurated channel BBC2, on 19 November 1964.

The director was Christopher Morahan, the producer Cedric Messina, and the settings were designed by William McCrow. Ian Carmichael was this time cast as the middle-aged Simon rather than the ambitious young BBC producer David Prentice, the role he'd previously played both on stage and film. David was played instead by Richard Briers, with Moira Lister as Laura.

Melville, who appeared in person to introduce the play, made various changes to his original script, including a self-reflexive rewrite for Simon's initial objections to working on TV: "Television? You call that a wonderful job? Three weeks' rehearsal, not enough money to cover your bus fares out to Lime Grove, technical breakdown in your one big scene, and no repeat performance? No, thank you." For BBC2 this became: "Television? You call that a wonderful job? Three weeks' rehearsal in a draughty drill hall, technical breakdown in your one big scene, and then your play goes out on BBC2? No, thank you."

Noting this, The Stage reported that "The script, with its lemon and sugar contrasts and archly sophisticated laughs, had been brought up to date with contemporary references and fitted happily into its new medium." It was repeated on 6 March 1966 but has not been seen since.

== Play cast ==
- Roland Culver – Simon Foster
- Coral Browne – Laura Foster
- Ernest Thesiger – Wilson
- Esma Cannon – Jessie
- Ronald Radd – Mr Wolfstein ('Wolfie')
- Ian Carmichael – David Prentice
- Dora Bryan – Janet Honeyman
- Lance Secretan – Timothy [pre-London tour]
- Michael Caridia – Timothy [West End]
- David Morrell – Barney
- Kenneth MacLeod – Joe
- Thomas Elliott – Bert
- Vivienne Drummond – Miss Mills
- Pauline Stroud – Mabel
- Roger Page – Archie
- Carole Shelley – Angela (added to the play mid-run, not in the published script)

== TV cast ==
- Ian Carmichael – Simon Foster
- Moira Lister – Laura Foster
- Charles Lloyd-Pack – Wilson
- Molly Urquhart – Jessie
- Philo Hauser – Wolfie
- Richard Briers – David Prentice
- Penny Morrell – Janet Honeyman
- Susan Ashworth – Mabel
- Henry McGee – Bert
- Reg Lever – Archie
- Bruce Wightman – Joe
- David Jackson – Barney
- Paul Holdaway – Timothy
- Lesley Allen – Miss Mills
