= Does the Team Think? =

British radio and television quiz show (1957–1976, 2007)

Does The Team Think? is a radio panel game broadcast originally on the BBC Light Programme (and later on BBC Radio 2 and BBC Radio 4) from 1957 to 1976, and revived, again on Radio 2, with a new cast, in 2007. It also broadcast as a television programme.

== Format ==
The show was a parody of Any Questions?, where audience members pose questions to an assembled panel. The questions and answers were played for laughs (in contrast to the serious political debate in Any Questions?), with the panellists improvising witty answers.

== Original series 1957–1976 ==
The idea of a parody version of Any Questions? was suggested by Jimmy Edwards in 1957. The Light Programme agreed to run a short series, which ended up running almost twenty years. The panel was chaired by Peter Haigh for the first series and by McDonald Hobley for the majority of its run. Regular panellists were Edwards, Arthur Askey, Tommy Trinder and Ted Ray, with a guest questioner joining them each week. Other panellists who appeared on the radio series included Bernard Braden, Kenneth Horne, Cyril Fletcher, Derek Roy, Richard Murdoch, Cardew Robinson, Alfred Marks and Leslie Crowther.

== Television series ==
A television programme of the same name was briefly trialled in 1961, also hosted by McDonald Hobley.

In 1982, a second television series ran for nine episodes, with Tim Brooke-Taylor as the host. It was produced by Robert Reed for Thames Television. Jimmy Edwards, Frankie Howerd, Beryl Reid and Willie Rushton were regular panellists. Guest questioners were Steve Davis, Robert Dougall, Britt Ekland, Roy Plomley, Magnus Pyke, Shaw Taylor and Barbara Woodhouse.

== 2007 revival ==
The radio show was revived in 2007. It was broadcast on BBC Radio 2 and was written and hosted by Vic Reeves, and produced by Paul Russell for Open Mike Productions. The title was changed slightly, to Does the Team Think.... The first programme went out on 28 June 2007. It was recorded at University of London Union on 27 March, 2, 23 and 30 April 2007. A second series was aired in 2009. The first programme from this series was aired on 17 June 2009 and featured Reeves' comedy partner Bob Mortimer, and Shooting Stars team captains Ulrika Jonsson and Jack Dee.

=== Episodes ===
Episode	Original airdate	Guests
Series 1 – 2007
1. 1–1	2007-06-28	Alan Carr, Jools Holland, Ben Miller, Pauline McLynn
2. 1–2	2007-07-05	Paul Whitehouse, Rowland Rivron, Andy Parsons, Lucy Porter
3. 1–3	2007-07-12	Suggs, Sean Lock, Patrick Kielty, Liz Smith
4. 1–4	2007-07-19	Laurence Llewelyn-Bowen, Tom Baker, Jo Caulfield, Arthur Smith
5. 1–5	2007-07-26	Paul Whitehouse, Lucy Porter, Michael McIntyre, Andy Parsons
6. 1–6	2007-08-02	Jo Caulfield, Arthur Smith, Tom Baker, Laurence Llewelyn-Bowen
7. 1–7	2007-08-09	Sean Lock, Suggs, Patrick Kielty, Liz Smith
8. 1–8	2007-08-16	Alan Carr, Ben Miller, Rowland Rivron, Shappi Khorsandi
Series 2 – 2009
9. 2–1	2009-06-17	Jack Dee, Julian Clary, Ulrika Jonsson, Bob Mortimer
10. 2–2	2009-06-24	Rhod Gilbert, Marcus Brigstocke, Noddy Holder, Liza Tarbuck
11. 2–3	2009-07-01	Andy Parsons, Ralf Little, Rich Hall, Gaby Roslin
12. 2–4	2009-07-08	Sean Hughes, Roy Walker, Bob Mortimer, Rhona Cameron
13. 2.5	2009-07-15	Jack Dee, Julian Clary, Ulrika Jonsson, Bob Mortimer
14. 2.6	2009-07-22	Noddy Holder, Rhod Gilbert, Marcus Brigstocke, Liza Tarbuck
15. 2.7	2009-07-29	Andy Parsons, Ralf Little, Gaby Roslin, Rich Hall
16. 2.8	2009-08-05	Sean Hughes, Roy Walker, Rhona Cameron, Bob Mortimer
