= Blinded by Science =

EP by Thomas Dolby
- Released: January 1983 (US)
- Genre: New wave
- Length: 29:14
- Label: Harvest

Blinded by Science is an EP by new wave/synthpop artist Thomas Dolby, comprising extended 12-inch single versions of songs from the 1982 album The Golden Age of Wireless. It was released in 1983.

Four of the recordings had previously been released as two separate 12-inch remix singles in the UK: "She Blinded Me with Science" backed with "One of Our Submarines"; and "Windpower" backed with "Flying North". (These two singles were also released in 7-inch format, containing their shorter versions.) "Airwaves" is the full-length UK album version, since the US version of The Golden Age of Wireless contained the shorter UK single version.

== Track listing ==
All songs by Thomas Dolby, except where otherwise indicated.

Side one

1. "She Blinded Me with Science" (Dolby, Jo Kerr) – 5:09
2. "One of Our Submarines" – 7:18

Side two

1. "Windpower" – 5:51
2. "Airwaves" – 5:20
3. "Flying North" – 5:36

== Personnel ==
Musicians

- Thomas Dolby – wave computer, drum programs, lead vocals
- Kevin Armstrong – guitar, backing vocals (1)
- Matthew Seligman – bass synthesizer (1, 2)
- Mark Heyward-Chaplin – bass guitar (4)
- Justin Hildreth – drums (4, 5)
- Simon Lloyd – brass and flute (3)
- Simon House – violin (1)
- Mutt Lange – backing vocals (1)
- Miriam Stockley – backing vocals (1)
- Bruce Woolley – backing vocals (4)
- Lesley Fairbairn – backing vocals (5)
- John Marsh – shipping forecast (3)
- Dr. Magnus Pyke – voice over

Technical

- Thomas Dolby – producer (1–5)
- Tim Friese-Greene – co-producer (1, 2)
- Andrew Douglas – photography

== Charts ==
=== Weekly charts ===
Chart (1983)	Peak position
US Billboard 200	20

=== Year-end charts ===
Chart (1983)	Position
US Billboard 200	55
