= Basil Bartlett =

British screenwriter (1905–1985)

Sir Basil Hardington Bartlett
- Born: 15 September 1905
- Died: 2 January 1985 (aged 79)
- Occupations: Actor and screenwriter
- Spouse: Mary Malcolm (m. 1937; div. 1960)
- Children: 3

Sir Basil Hardington Bartlett, 2nd Baronet (15 September 1905 – 2 January 1985) was an actor, screenwriter and writer, and in the 1950s the head of the BBC's script department.

Barlett was a grandson of the building contractor Sir Herbert Bartlett, who he succeeded as a baronet during his adolescence. He had a relatively brief career as a stage actor during the interwar period. He served as a captain in the British Army in the early phases of World War II, but he was wounded in the Battle of Dunkirk (1940). He later published his diary (journal) about his experiences from the battle. During his convalescence, Bartlett worked as screenwriter for several war films. After recovering from his injuries, he was seconded to the Intelligence Corps and served as the leader of an army-operated kinematographic group.

== Life ==
In 1921, at the age of 16, he succeeded as the second Bartlett baronet of Hardington Mandeville, upon inheriting the title from his grandfather, the building contractor Sir Herbert Bartlett, as his father had died the previous year.

Educated at Repton School in Derbyshire, he went up to Corpus Christi College, Cambridge, graduating as Bachelor of Arts (proceeding MA).

Starting out as a stage actor in the 1930s, Bartlett was commissioned in the British Army at the outbreak of World War II, and served as a captain during the retreat to Dunkirk in 1940: mentioned in despatches, he was wounded during the retreat.

He published My First War: An Army Officer's Journal for May 1940, Through Belgium to Dunkirk. During his convalescence he worked as screenwriter of the war films The Next of Kin (1942) (which he later also turned into a novel), Secret Mission (1942) and They Met in the Dark (1943). Seconded to the Intelligence Corps, he was promoted to the rank of lieutenant-colonel in charge of the kinematographic group of 21st Army Group.

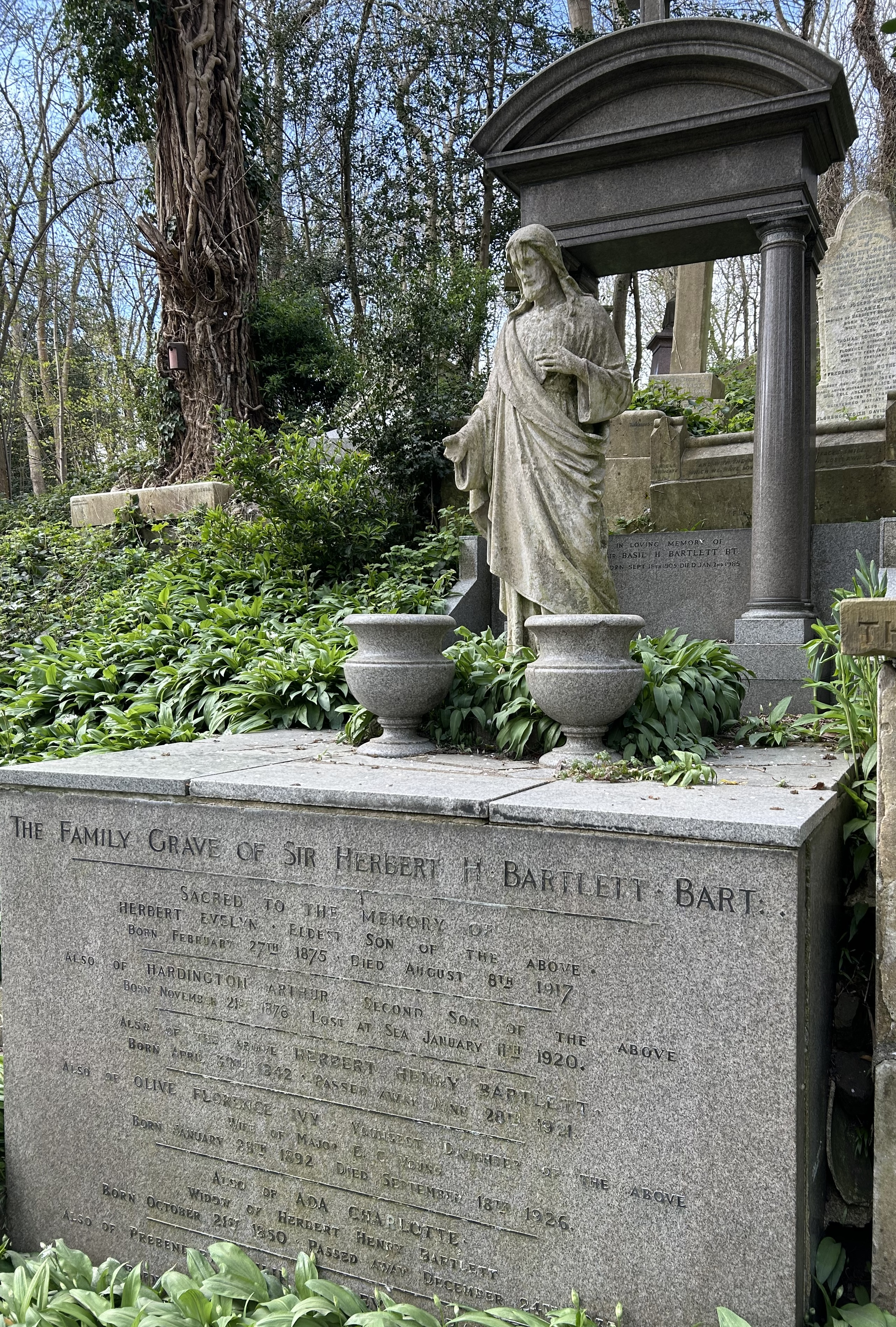
The Bartlett family vault in Highgate Cemetery

After the War, Bartlett briefly tried to take up his career as actor again, appearing in Captain Horatio Hornblower R.N. (1951), before joining the BBC, where he became Head of the Script Department, but also translated a couple of French screenplays. He participated as model in three of the six 15-minute programmes in BBC's first ever series in colour, Men, Women and Clothes, a history of fashion which was broadcast between 21 April and 26 May 1957 (available in the BBC on line archive).

== Marriage, children, and succession ==
He was married to Mary Malcolm (daughter of Sir Ian Malcolm), one of the first two regular female announcers on BBC Television after World War II, from 1937 to 1960, and they had three daughters. Upon his death in 1985, the baronetcy passed to his younger brother, the Olympic fencer, David Bartlett. He was buried in the Bartlett family vault on the western side of Highgate Cemetery, on the main path just below the Egyptian Avenue. His inscription is on the vertical slab behind the figure of Jesus.

== Filmography ==
- Less Than Kind (TV film) (1959) (translator)
- Men, Women and Clothes: Informal Clothes (TV programme) (1957) (actor)
- Men, Women and Clothes: Sense and Nonsense in Fashion (TV programme) (1957) (actor)
- Men, Women and Clothes: How Fashions Come and Go (TV programme) (1957) (actor)
- It Is Midnight, Doctor Schweitzer (TV film) (1953) (translator)
- Asmodée (TV film) (1952) (translator)
- Captain Horatio Hornblower R.N. (1951) (actor, playing Captain Elliott – uncredited)
- Dunkirk: A Personal Perspective (radio programme) (1950) (narrator)
- They Met in the Dark (scenario) (1943)
- Secret Mission (screenwriter) (1942)
- The Next of Kin (screenwriter and military supervisor) (1942)

== Bibliography ==
- Captain Sir Basil Bartlett Bt: My First War: An Army Officer's Journal for May 1940, Through Belgium to Dunkirk – London: Chatto & Windas, 1940.
- Sir Basil Bartlett: Next of Kin, a novel – London: Chatto & Windus, 1944
- Sir Basil Bartlett: Writing for Television – London: Allen & Unwin, 1955
- Sir Basil Bartlett: Jam Tomorrow: Some Early Reminiscences – London: Harper Collins, 1978. ISBN 0236401386

Baronetage of the United Kingdom
Preceded by Sir Herbert Bartlett	Baronet (of Hardington Mandeville); 1921–1985	Succeeded by Sir David Bartlett
