= Sir David Bartlett, 3rd Baronet =

British fencer

Sir David Bartlett, Bt
Personal information
- Full name: Henry David Hardington Bartlett
- Born: 18 March 1912
- Died: 13 September 1989 (aged 77)

Sport
- Sport: Fencing

Sir Henry David Hardington Bartlett, 3rd Baronet (18 March 1912 – 13 September 1989) was a British fencer.

== Biography ==
Bartlett was educated at Stowe School. In 1934 and 1935, he won the two foil title at the British Fencing Championships. The following year in 1936, he was selected to represent Great Britain at the 1936 Summer Olympics in Berlin. He competed in the individual foil event, finishing in fifth place in Pool 8. He also took part in the Men's team foil event, reaching the second round.

In 1939, he was commissioned in the Royal Artillery.

Baronetage of the United Kingdom
Preceded by Basil Bartlett	Baronet (of Hardington-Mandeville); 1985–1989	Succeeded by John Bartlett
