= Herbert Bartlett =

Sir Herbert Henry Bartlett, 1st Baronet (30 April 1842 – 23 June 1921) was a civil engineer and contractor responsible for many landmark buildings in London.

== Life ==
Bartlett was born at Hardington Mandeville. Aged 23, he joined Perry & Company, a civil engineering contractor founded by East End carpenter John Perry, based in Bow, east London, in 1865. He became a partner in the business in 1872, and after the death of Perry's three sons, became sole proprietor in 1888. In 1897, Bartlett signed a £877,000 contract to construct a deep tube under the Thames from Waterloo to Baker Street - part of the present-day Bakerloo Line.

Bartlett was president of the Institute of Builders and the London Master Builders Association, and three times Master of the Worshipful Company of Pattenmakers. He was made a Baronet in 1913.

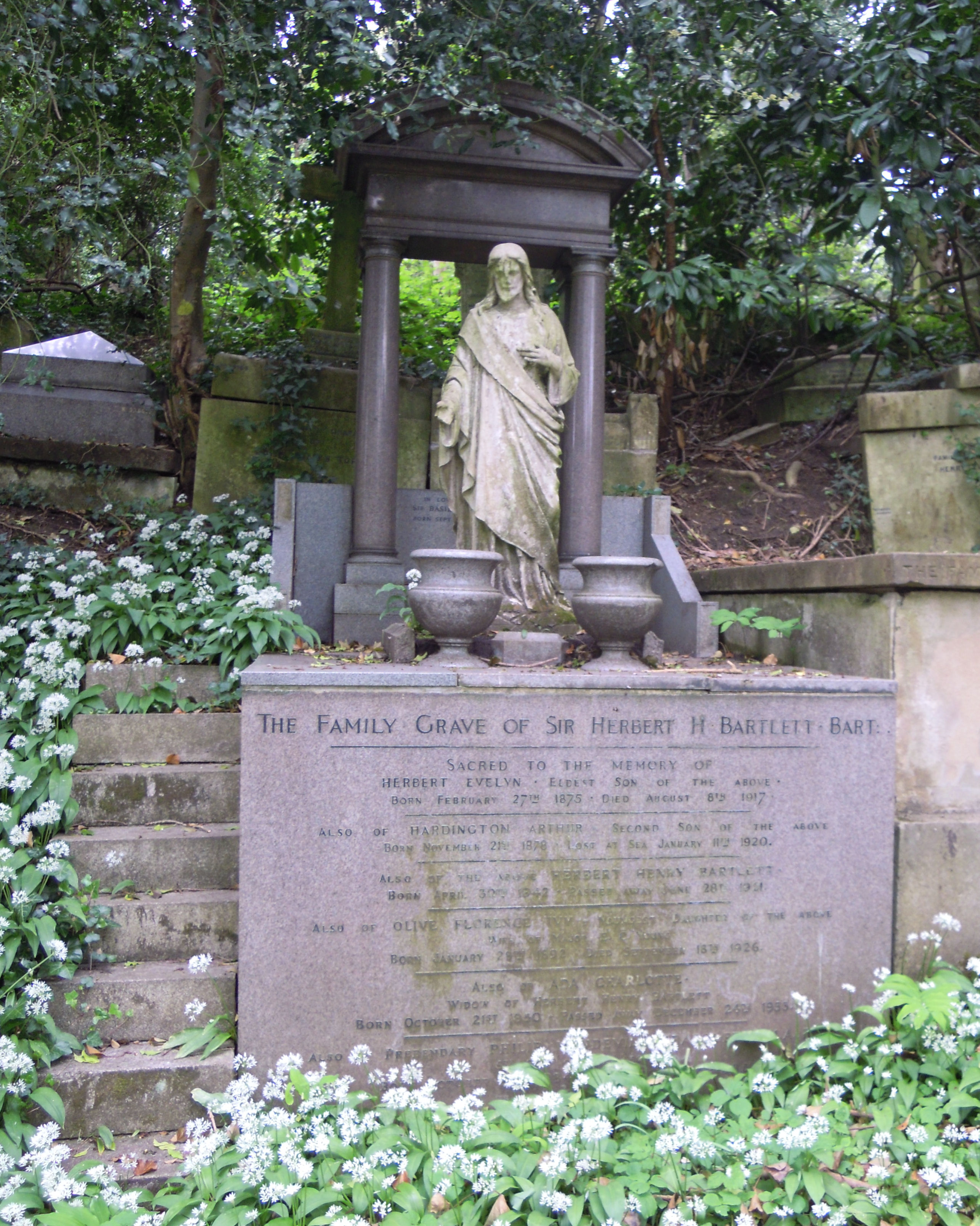
The family grave of Herbert Bartlett in Highgate Cemetery

He married Ada Charlotte Barr, and had several children. He lived from 1900 at Cornwall Gardens in west London.

He is buried in the family grave, which lies in the western half of Highgate Cemetery in north London on the main central path, just below the entrance to the Egyptian Avenue.

On his death his baronetcy passed to his grandson, Basil, as his two eldest sons had predeceased him (Herbert Evelyn Barlett, 1875–1917, and Hardington Arthur Bartlett 1877–1920, lost at sea).

== Memorials ==
In 1911, he gave £30,000 to University College London to fund a new building for the School of Architecture, along with the Department of Applied Statistics and studios for the teaching of sculpture. The donation was initially anonymous, but in 1919 he consented to his name being revealed, and The Bartlett (the Faculty of the Built Environment) now bears his name.

Bartlett also made a sizeable donation to Ernest Shackleton's first voyage to Antarctica, where the explorer named a peak 'Mount Bartlett' after him.

== Notable works ==
Bartlett's contracts and designs included:

- the rebuilt Waterloo station
- St Thomas' Hospital (his 1896 building was rebuilt in the 1970s)
- improvements at Somerset House
- various stations on the London Underground between Baker Street and Waterloo
- part of Tower Bridge

Bartlett was also a keen yachtsman, being commodore of the Royal London Yacht Club.

== References and sources ==
Sources

- The Times Obituary 4 Jul 1921
- Leigh Rayment's list of baronets

Baronetage of the United Kingdom
New creation	Baronet (of Hardington-Mandeville); 1913–1921	Succeeded by Basil Bartlett
