= Kaleidoscope (British TV series) =

1946 British TV light entertainment series (1946–1953)

- Presented by: McDonald Hobley
- Country of origin: United Kingdom
- Original language: English
- No. of seasons: 7
- No. of episodes: 104

Production
- Running time: 60 minutes
- Production company: BBC

Original release
- Release: 22 November 1946

Kaleidoscope is a British television programme, transmitted on BBC Television Service from 1946 until 1953. A light entertainment show, it was one of the most popular programmes of the immediate post-war era.

The first episode was transmitted on 22 November 1946; thereafter, it was usually transmitted at 8:30pm on Friday evenings. Initially, it was a thirty-minute broadcast airing every other week, alternating with the early sitcom Pinwright's Progress, but later in its run, the episodes increased to one hour.

The programme had a variety of different features, including 'Collector's Corner,' in which antiques expert Iris Brooke would show various items of interest; 'Word Play,' a charades game performed by young actors and actresses from the Rank Organisation's "Company of Youth," also known as the "Charm School;" the 'Memory Man' (Leslie Welch) and 'Be Your Own Detective,' a series of short thrillers designed to test the viewers' powers of observation, written by Mileson Horton in a similar style to his earlier series Telecrime. There were also various comedy sketches – Tony Hancock had his first regular television role on the programme, appearing for four episodes in 1951.

Kaleidoscope was transmitted live from the BBC's studios at Alexandra Palace. McDonald Hobley acted as the presenter, and it was initially produced by John Irwin. The final episode was shown on 26 June 1953.

A similar show was also produced in New Zealand by TVNZ in the 1980s.
