= McDonald Hobley =

British TV broadcaster and actor (1917–1987)

McDonald Hobley

Dennys Jack Valentine McDonald-Hobley (9 June 1917 – 30 July 1987) was a British actor of stage and screen, radio and television broadcaster and compère, who was one of the earliest BBC Television continuity announcers, appearing on screen from 1946 to 1956. Born in Stanley in the Falkland Islands and educated at Brighton College, England, he decided to become an actor and began his career as a character actor in repertory theatre. The Second World War saw Hobley serve as a gunner in the Royal Artillery and become a captain in the South East Asia Command. He was seconded by Lord Mountbatten to the British Forces Broadcasting Service in Ceylon.

After he was demobbed in 1946, Hobley was entered into a competition for announcers of the BBC Television service and was successful. He announced, commentated on sport, compèred panel games, provided film commentary and conducted interviews on chat shows. Hobley resigned from the BBC in 1956 to join ABC Weekend TV as an announcer, and left three years later to become a freelancer. He had roles in stage musicals, pantomimes and plays.

== Childhood and early career ==
Hobley (pronounced to rhyme with 'nobly') was born the son of Charles McDonald Hobley, the naval chaplain at the cathedral in Stanley, Falkland Islands, and his wife Gladys (née Blanchard) on 9 June 1917. He was christened Dennys Jack Valentine McDonald-Hobley and had an older sister. Hobley's grandfather and great-grandfather had also been clergymen. He was first educated at a preparatory school for children of English residents run by his father in Chile. The family moved to England when he was ten, and his father established a preparatory school in Burgess Hill. Hobley attended Brighton College, England, a public school, from 1931 to 1936. He represented the college in fives, hurdles and rugby, and was captain of the athletic, cricket, and fencing teams.

He had become interested in the school dramatic society and made a decision to take up acting as a profession after it was suggested to him when he received positive reviews from local critics. Upon leaving college, he began his acting career as a character actor in repertory theatre at Theatre Royal, Brighton and at the Bath and Cambridge repertory companies. Hobley went under the stage names Val Blanchard and Robert Blanchard, using his mother's maiden name. He began in walk-on roles, before appearing in seven Gilbert and Sullivan operas, and touring before the Second World War in J. B. Priestley's Time and the Conways.

== War service ==
During the Second World War, Hobley served as a gunner in the Royal Artillery from November 1939 and served four-and-a-half years as a Captain in the South East Asia Command. It was during this time that he shortened his name to McDonald Hobley, and preferred to be referred to as "Mac". He was involved in an ultimately abandoned plot to abduct Adolf Hitler and bring him to Britain. He attracted Lord Mountbatten's attention; Mountbatten seconded Hobley to the British Forces Broadcasting Service in Ceylon in the final months of the war, working at Radio SEAC.

== Post-war ==
He told an acquaintance in the Far East that he would like to try to become an announcer for the BBC so he could meet drama directors. After being demobbed in 1946, Hobley joined the London Vaudeville Company for one night to appear in the ex-service's performance of There is a Kingdom. He later received a telegram to enter a competition to select announcers for the post-war revival of BBC Television, after a friend of his entered his name. Hobley was selected as an announcer in May 1946 after winning over 281 other applicants. He began work on 7 June 1946, the day of BBC Television's reopening, and stopped acting in theatre. He was the only male BBC announcer. His job was to announce, commentate on sport, compère panel games, film commentary and conduct interviews on chat shows. Hobley covered events such as the Coronation of Elizabeth II and Eurovision's launch.

He was also one of the compères on the BBC's Come Dancing programme and appeared on various other shows as himself. Hobley headed the team of BBC Television's early continuity announcers, which included Jasmine Bligh, Peter Haigh, Mary Malcolm and Sylvia Peters. He once introduced the politician Sir Stafford Cripps as 'Sir Stifford Crapps'. Hobley was the presenter of arts films on the magazine programme Kaleidoscope from 1946 to 1953, and was also a presenter of BBC TV's For Deaf Children between 1953 and 1956.

In March 1956, he resigned from the BBC and joined ABC Weekend TV as a commentator; the company was part of the Independent Television network which had recently been created to compete with the BBC. It was reported that his annual salary increased as a result from £1,300 to £5,000. He remained at ABC Weekend for three years until his contract expired and he became a freelance actor and broadcaster. In 1956, Hobley chaired the only series of the panel game Yakity Yak, in which six woman panellists were encouraged to provide absurd answers to questions. The following year, with his ABC contract allowing him to work freely on weekdays, he returned to BBC Television to be the quiz-master of Up for the Cup, a fortnightly sports quiz show for ten teams of football supporters. Hobley also introduced for ABC the musical magazine What's News?, Film Fanfare in which he reported on news, previews and views of films and actors, State Your Case in which contestants vied to win £100, and Holiday Town in which he visited various resorts across Britain. He also compèred the talent discovery programme Bid for Fame, the panel game Tell the Truth, Close Up, and Hometown Saturday Night.

In 1958, Hobley co-presented a request show on Radio Luxembourg with either Teddy Johnson or Beryl Reid. He returned to the BBC in October 1960, presenting a Woman's Hour programme on television at the instigation of BBC women's programme director Doreen Stephens, as well as a record show on the radio. He compèred the weekly half-hour children's entertainment programme Whistle Stop! at several locations in Britain starting from the same month. Hobley resumed his acting career in the BBC Television comedy play Looking for Garrow in which he played an English lord, whose daughter becomes involved with a beatnik. He went on to have a guest appearance as a television announcer in ABC's Our House. Three years later, Hobley co-presented the ITV programme Up and Doing with Anne Edwards as well as having a guest appearance on the quiz game Password.

He returned to present one series of the inter-town contest It's a Knockout on BBC 1 in 1966. During that year, Hobley also returned to radio, fronting the Coffee Break Show on the pirate station Wonderful Radio London. On BBC radio and television, he was chairman of the comedy quiz Does the Team Think? from 1958 to 1976. Hobley had a role as Harold Furness in the ATV serial Crossroads in 1967. To celebrate the 50th anniversary of BBC Television, he re-appeared in November 1986, as an in-vision announcer between programmes on BBC 2.

Hobley had roles in multiple films. He played a salesman in No Place for Jennifer (1950), Peter Sinclair in The Kilties are Coming (1951), himself in Meet Mr. Lucifer (1953), had a voice-over part in The Time of His Life (1955), played himself in Man of the Moment (1955), a commentator in Checkpoint (1956), himself in The Entertainer (1960) and Primitive London (1965). Upon his return to the stage in 1960, he toured in musicals, pantomimes and plays. Hobley appeared in London's West End in the farce No Sex Please, We're British, toured in Not Now, Darling, Side by Side by Sondheim, She Stoops to Conquer, Twelfth Night, On Golden Pond, Forty Years On, No, No, Nanette, Anyone for Denis. He also appeared in It Ain't Half Hot Mum, Carry On Laughing and The Goodies, among other programmes.

In 1986, he returned to the Falkland Islands for a Channel 4 broadcast about the then British South Atlantic Dependencies. In July 1987, Hobley was rehearsing the world premiere of Anthony Marriott and Bob Grant's play Home is Where Your Clothes Are, produced by David Tudor. He had extreme difficulty learning his lines, which was unusual, and Tudor had to release him from his contract.

== Personal life ==
Hobley had a keen interest in motor racing and was an amateur racing driver. In 1958, he assisted in preventing a smash and grab at a Belgravia jeweller.

He was married three times. Hobley was first married to Betty Doreen Hobley until they divorced in November 1953. His second marriage was to the fashion model Noel Scott-Gorman, and his final marriage was to the actress and musical comedienne Jean Pauline McDonald. With his first wife Hobley had a daughter, who died of cancer in October 1956.

He died on 30 July 1987 at his home in Bournemouth during recovery from an operation to remove a cancerous tumour in his head, when he suffered a fatal heart attack. A memorial service was held for Hobley at The Church Of The Transfiguration in Dorset on the afternoon of 7 August 1987. He was cremated at Bournemouth Crematorium.

== Awards ==
Hobley was named TV Personality of the Year in both 1953 and 1954 and was a recipient of the Baird Medal.
