= HMS P48 (1942) =

Submarine of the Royal Navy

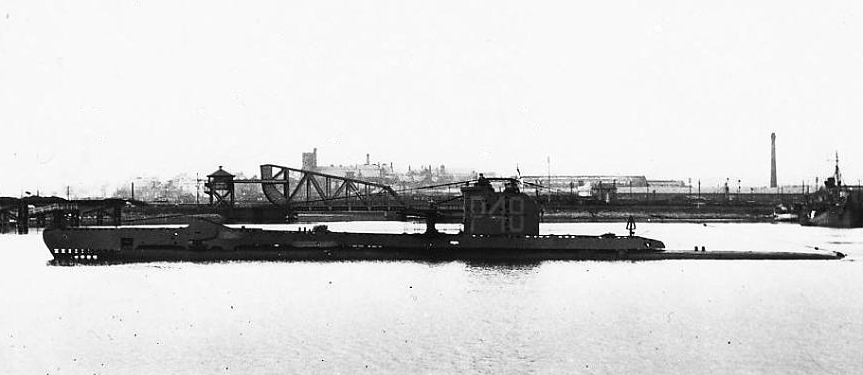
- HMS P48 on the surface, passing the bridge at Buccleuch Dock, Barrow in Furness

History

United Kingdom
- Name: HMS P48
- Ordered: 23 August 1940
- Builder: Vickers Armstrong, Barrow-in-Furness
- Laid down: 2 August 1941
- Launched: 15 April 1942
- Commissioned: 18 June 1942
- Fate: Missing since 23 December 1942

General characteristics
- Class & type: U-class
- Displacement: Surfaced – 545 tons standard, 630 tons full load; Submerged – 740 tons
- Length: 196.75 ft (59.97 m)
- Beam: 16 ft 1 in (4.90 m)
- Draught: 15 ft 2 in (4.62 m)
- Propulsion: Two shafts, diesel-electric; two diesel generators + electric motors; 615 / 825 hp
- Speed: 14.25 knots max surfaced; 9 knots max submerged
- Complement: 31
- Armament: Four bow internal 21 inch (533 mm) torpedo tubes; 8 torpedoes; One 3-inch (76 mm) gun

HMS P48 was a Royal Navy U-class submarine built by Vickers-Armstrongs at Barrow-in-Furness. Commissioned on 18 June 1942, Vickers arranged for the wife of serving submarine Captain, Alister Mars of HMS Unbroken, Ting Mars and Commander of the cruiser Jamaica to officially launch P.48 at Barrow dockyard.

After an initial patrol in the Norwegian Sea, P48 spent most of her career in the Mediterranean Sea. She sailed to Gibraltar, then was assigned to the 10th Submarine Flotilla which was based in Malta. After an uneventful patrol, she departed port on her last patrol, on 23 December 1942. She is thought to have been sunk two days later whilst attacking an Italian convoy in the Gulf of Tunis heading towards Tunis, from depth charges launched by the Italian torpedo boat Ardente, northwest of the island of Zembra.

The vessel and her crew were honoured and immortalized by the nephew of one of the lost sailors (Lt. Stephen E. Spring Rice, RNVR), English musician Thomas Dolby, in the August 1982 song "One of Our Submarines".

== Design and description ==
The third batch was slightly enlarged and improved over the preceding second batch of the U class. The submarines had a length of 196.75 feet (60.0 m) overall and displaced 545 long tons (554 t) on the surface and 740 long tons (750 t) submerged. The U-class submarines had a crew of 31 officers and ratings.

P48 was powered on the surface by two diesel engines providing a total of 615-brake-horsepower (459 kW) and when submerged by two electric motors with a total of 825-horsepower (615 kW) through two propeller shafts. The maximum speed was 14.25 knots (26.39 km/h; 16.40 mph) on the surface and 9 knots (17 km/h; 10 mph) underwater.

P48 was armed with four 21-inch torpedo tubes in the bow and also carried four reloads for a grand total of eight torpedoes. The boat was also equipped with a 3-inch (76 mm) deck gun.

== Construction and service ==
Ordered on 23 August 1940, P48 was laid down on 2 August 1941 by Vickers Armstrong at Barrow-in-Furness, then launched on 15 April 1942. She was commissioned on 18 June 1942 at Holy Loch, then conducted training and diving tests in the River Clyde area. After additional tests with torpedoes off Arrochar, the submarine then sailed for Lerwick, arriving on 17 July.

The next day on 18 July, P48 departed Lerwick for an anti-submarine patrol in the Norwegian Sea. The patrol was uneventful, and she returned to port on 29 July. After passing through Holy Loch and Rothesay, the boat departed for Gibraltar on 12 August; after one week at sea, she was ordered to search for a German tanker, but suffered flooding in her auxiliary machinery, forcing her to abandon her patrol and continue to Gibraltar. On 23 August, P48 arrived and underwent repairs, then exercises until 27 September.

Between 29 September and 6 October 1942, P48 conducted another patrol, in the Alboran Sea, but did not record any sinkings. On 31 October, P48 departed Gibraltar for another patrol in the Mediterranean, with orders to conduct a special landing operation off Algiers, then proceed to Malta. Her armament had been reduced to six torpedoes overall to make space for the extra equipment. On 4 October, P48 launched a landing party in a folbot, then acted as a directional radio beacon during the Allied landings three days later. After being ordered to patrol off Bizerte, Tunisia, P48 sighted an enemy merchant ship and attacked it with three torpedoes, but missed. After another unsuccessful attack, the submarine ended her patrol in Malta and joined the 10th Submarine Flotilla which was based there.

On 26 November, P48 started another patrol, northeast of Tunisia. One week later, she attacked a German-Italian convoy, but did not obtain any hits; she was subsequently attacked with depth charges by escorting ships but was not damaged. On 5 December, the boat launched three torpedoes at a German merchant ship, escorted by a destroyer. The torpedoes missed, however, and P48 was again attacked, but escaped unscathed. the submarine returned to Malta on 8 December.

HMS P48 departed Malta on her last patrol on 23 December 1942, under the command of Lieutenant M.E. Faber. Two days later, while attacking a large Italian convoy, an escorting aircraft fired bursts of machine-gun fire into the sea to signal the presence of an enemy submarine. Seconds later, the escorting Italian torpedo boat Ardente made sonar contact with a target, then attacked it with 48 depth charges. A large oil patch 100–150 metres in diameter was observed in position 37°17′N 10°32′E and the crew of the torpedo boat claimed the submarine sunk. It is most likely that the submarine was P48, but her wreck was not found and it is possible that she was sunk elsewhere later. The submarine was officially declared overdue on 5 January 1943.
