= Band of Thieves (1962 film) =

1962 British film by Peter Bezencenet

- Directed by: Peter Bezencenet
- Written by: Lyn Fairhurst; Harold Shampan
- Produced by: Lance Comfort
- Starring: Acker Bilk; Geoffrey Sumner; Jennifer Jayne
- Cinematography: Nicolas Roeg
- Edited by: Tristam Cones
- Music by: Norrie Paramor
- Production company: Filmvale Productions
- Distributed by: Rank Film Distributors
- Release date: 30 August 1962
- Running time: 69 minutes
- Country: United Kingdom
- Language: English

Band of Thieves is a 1962 British second feature ('B') musical film directed by Peter Bezencenet and starring Acker Bilk, Geoffrey Sumner and Jennifer Jayne. It was written by Lyn Fairhurst and Harold Shampan, and was produced in an attempt to cash in on the Trad jazz craze. It was Bilk's second film after his earlier appearance in the musical-comedy It's Trad, Dad!, and the first to feature him in a starring role.

According to Filmink "there is something daggily endearing about the way the Rank Organisation missed out on making all the British rock musicals of the late 1950s and early 1960s that earned money (i.e. the ones with Tommy Steele, Cliff Richard, and The Beatles) but decided to invest in a trad jazz musical."

== Plot ==
Acker Bilk and his trad-jazz band are in prison. On their release they are persuaded by their promoter to burgle local stately homes while on tour. His girlfriend, a policewoman, finds out, and Bilk and his band go back to prison, as does the promoter.

== Cast ==
- Acker Bilk as himself
- Colin Smith as Flash
- Jonathan Mortimer as Fingers
- Ronald McKay as Scouse
- Roy James as Dippy
- Stan Greig as Haggis
- Jimmy Thompson as Derek Daley
- Ernest Price as The Mole
- Geoffrey Sumner as The Governor
- Jimmy Thompson as Derek
- Jennifer Jayne as Anne
- Maudie Edwards as The Duchess
- Charmian Innes as Mrs. Van Der Ness
- Arthur Mullard as Getaway
- Michael Peake as Chief Warder
- Totti Truman Taylor as woman
- Marianne Stone as cleaner
- Eleanor McCready as girl
- Norrie Paramor as himself, recording engineer
- Peter Haigh as himself, newsreader
- Acker Bilk's Paramount Jazz Band as themselves
- Carol Deene as herself, singer

== Production ==
It was shot at Pinewood Studios, with cinematography by Nicolas Roeg. Filming took place in May 1962.

== Critical reception ==
The Monthly Film Bulletin wrote: "It's the exuberance that matters. Like a seaside summer show, the film knows its place and its public and isn't ashamed of either. The plot is as zestfully slapdash as the production and the acting. But some cooler jokes suggest a knowing mind at work on the script, and Acker Bilk – both musically and personally – is a welcome addition to the screen ranks."

The Radio Times Guide to Films gave the film 2/5 stars, writing: "Nicolas Roeg received his third credit as a cinematographer on this caper comedy. But jazz fans will be more interested in seeing Acker Bilk starring in the second of his three 1960s pictures. Ostensibly, the clarinettist plays himself. But the real Acker presumably didn't use his gigs as a front for stately home robberies! ... Slight, but fun."
