= One of Our Submarines =

Single by Thomas Dolby

from the album Blinded by Science EP
- Released: 25 October 1982
- Recorded: August 1982
- Genre: Synth-pop; new wave
- Length: 5:11; 7:18 (extended version)
- Label: Venice in Peril (UK); Capitol Records (U.S.)
- Songwriter: Thomas Dolby
- Producer: Thomas Dolby

Thomas Dolby singles chronology
"She Blinded Me With Science" (1982)	"One of Our Submarines" (1982)	"Hyperactive!" (1984)

"One of Our Submarines" is a song by British musician Thomas Dolby. The song was recorded in August 1982 and remains a favourite among Thomas Dolby fans. Originally written for the Thompson Twins, the track was released in a 12" extended version (found on the successful 1982 "Blinded by Science" EP) clocking in at 7:18, as well as in the album version found on The Golden Age of Wireless.

== Inspiration ==
The inspiration for the song was Dolby's late uncle, who died as a submarine crewman during World War II. On February 2, 2018, Dolby published this statement on his personal Facebook page:

In 1981 I wrote a song called 'One Of Our Submarines.' It was the B-side to the single 'She Blinded Me With Science', and the two songs were included on a reissue of my debut album The Golden Age of Wireless.

In interviews I often told the story of my uncle, Stephen Spring-Rice, who was 2nd in command of a British Navy WW2 submarine P48 when it sank, with the loss of all hands. In the song lyrics, his submarine 'ran aground on manoeuvres.' I imagined this took place off the coast of England in a non-combat situation, near Plymouth where she was stationed. This was the story as I remembered it in family folklore—or as I pictured it at the time. (I have often written lyrics that rhymed and scanned and used poetic license, without much solid research behind them!) In 1981 not much was known or published about Stephen’s U-boat [sic], P48, other than a book by the same title that included a dedication to 'Sprice.'

In the 35+ years since I wrote the song, a great deal more information about P48 has come to light. Certain naval records have become declassified. Commissioned in 1942, she had a short-lived but quite action-packed career. In particular, it is now known that Stephen’s sub, P48, was actually lost off the coast of Tunisia. She was depth charged by the Italian torpedo boat Ardente on Christmas Day in 1942 at 37°15'N, 10°30'E, near to Zembra Island. She was tracking an important enemy ship convoy, one of which she may have destroyed. It is not clear whether she sank right away or survived initially only to perish elsewhere.

In the last few months, a dive expedition off the North African coast believe they have located the wreck of the P48 submarine. In July 2018 they hope to dive to the wreck, which may reveal a clearer picture of her sinking. Obviously, I’m very keen to follow their progress, and I will update the story I tell—though it’s a little too late to change the lyrics to 'One Of Our Submarines.'

== Remixes ==
In 2002, an EP of techno remixes was released on Salz Music, including versions by Ricardo Villalobos and Hardfloor.

== Personnel ==
- Thomas Dolby – PPG Wave Computer, drum programs, lead vocals
- Kevin Armstrong – Electric Guitar
- Matthew Seligman – Bass Synthesizer
