= Wilfrid Thomas =

Australian musician (1904–1991)

Wilfrid Coad Thomas AO (2 May 1904 – 16 August 1991) was a British-born singer and broadcaster, who had a significant career in Australia, later in London as a radio and television commentator for the BBC. His name is very frequently mis-spelled "Wilfred".

== Biography ==
=== In Australia (mostly) ===
Thomas's parents, who were of Welsh and Cornish extraction, emigrated to Australia when Wilfrid was very young. He had a natural bass-baritone voice, and at the age of 14 took a series of office jobs to pay for singing lessons. At some stage his singing teacher was Emily Marks.

At the age of 18 he toured Australia with the Welsh Choral Society, and sang the bass solo from Messiah at the Sydney Town Hall in 1923. He was "discovered" by Dame Nellie Melba. He toured Australia in 1923 with Edward Branscombe's Westminster Glee Singers, concluding in Sydney in 1924.

He then applied for a job with Farmer's department store's newly formed radio station 2FC. He was not employed as an announcer straight away, but he proved his versatility as a character actor in radio plays, as a pianist and singer; his Welsh-accented natural bass-baritone voice found ready acceptance with audiences. He rejoined the Westminster Glee Singers on their return visit to Australia in 1930, and left with them in December after a triumphant tour of Australia.

In 1934 he married the Swedish dancer Marga Lienhart of Colonel de Basil's Ballet Russe de Monte Carlo, which toured Australia in 1936 (Thomas narrated the documentary film).

A recording he made was selected by The Gramophone as one of ten outstanding discs of 1936.

He wrote and acted in a thirteen-part radio play Vocal Boy Makes Good, which was broadcast by the BBC. Among his song-writing credits is the English lyrics for Rose, Rose, I Love You for the 1940 Chinese popular song "Méigui méigui wǒ ài nǐ" (玫瑰玫瑰我愛你). The English lyrics were first recorded in 1951 by Frankie Laine (Note: The Frankie Laine version was later heard in the film The Last Picture Show.) and had little in common with the original Mandarin.

He returned to Australia in 1940, producing Out of the Bag, a variety show starring Dick Bentley, Joy Nicholls, Kitty Bluett, and Bettina Dickson; frequently broadcast from army camps. It was on this show that Bentley developed his talent for comedy.

In 1941 2FC (by this time an ABC station) commissioned his long-running Wilfrid Thomas Show, an hour of variety, with his trademark sign-off "This is Wilfrid Thomas thanking you for having me at your place." In 1943 he was appointed Director of Light Entertainment, while continuing to host his weekly show and produce Out of the Bag.

He left his wife, who would not divorce him, to live with actress Bettina "Bettie" Dickson (22 December 1920 – 23 October 1994 (Note: Dickson's death is frequently given as 1991, but this may be a confusion with Wilfrid's, as Lane clearly has her working at the time of publication.)), who continued her dramatic career and acted as Wilfrid's manager. Thomas and Dickson married in London in 1956.

=== In London ===
In 1951 the format of the show changed, with Thomas being based in London and producing his weekly programs from British or Continental locations or from his top-floor Mayfair flat, where he played host to a wide variety of show-business celebrities. He and Bettie had a holiday home at Pittwater, where he enjoyed surf fishing.

=== Italian connection ===
Thomas's first direct involvement with Italy was immediately post-war when he was stirred by the plight of "Displaced Persons" (refugees) to involve himself in the Inter-governmental Committee for European Migration, and used his pen and microphone to welcome the flood of unemployed Italian migrants to Australia.

Later he was involved with the refugees in the November 1980 earthquake disaster in Naples. As chairman of the Guild of Travel Writers in London, he helped raise donations for the relief fund.

Thomas and his wife Bettie owned an apartment in a 14th-century house on the Isola Tiberina in the middle of the River Tiber, where they holidayed every year.

=== Television ===
Thomas was one of television's pioneers, acting for John Logie Baird in a basement studio in the BBC's "Broadcasting House" complex. In 1956 he was the first UK commentator in the First Eurovision Song Contest. He continued to be associated with TV in the United Kingdom until his death in 1991.

== Oral history ==
Thomas was interviewed in 1966 by Hazel de Berg about his early working career and his career in radio. He was again interviewed in 1971. Both recordings can be found at the National Library of Australia.

== Recognition ==
- Recognised by the Guinness Book of Records for having the longest running radio programme.
- Awarded the Order of Australia in 1976 for distinguished services to the media.
- Awarded Cavalière Ufficiale al Mérito della República Italiana (knight of merit of the Italian Republic) in 1982 by the Italian Government.

== Bibliography ==
- Thomas, Wilfrid Living on Air (1958) Frederick Muller Ltd. (London)
- Jürgen Claus, "Ein Vorläufer: Thomas Wilfred", in: Jürgen Claus: "Kunst heute", Rowohlt Verlag, 1965

== Notes ==
| Preceded by | Eurovision Song Contest UK Commentator; 1956 | Succeeded by Berkeley Smith |
