= Theo Uittenbogaard =

Dutch radio & TV-producer

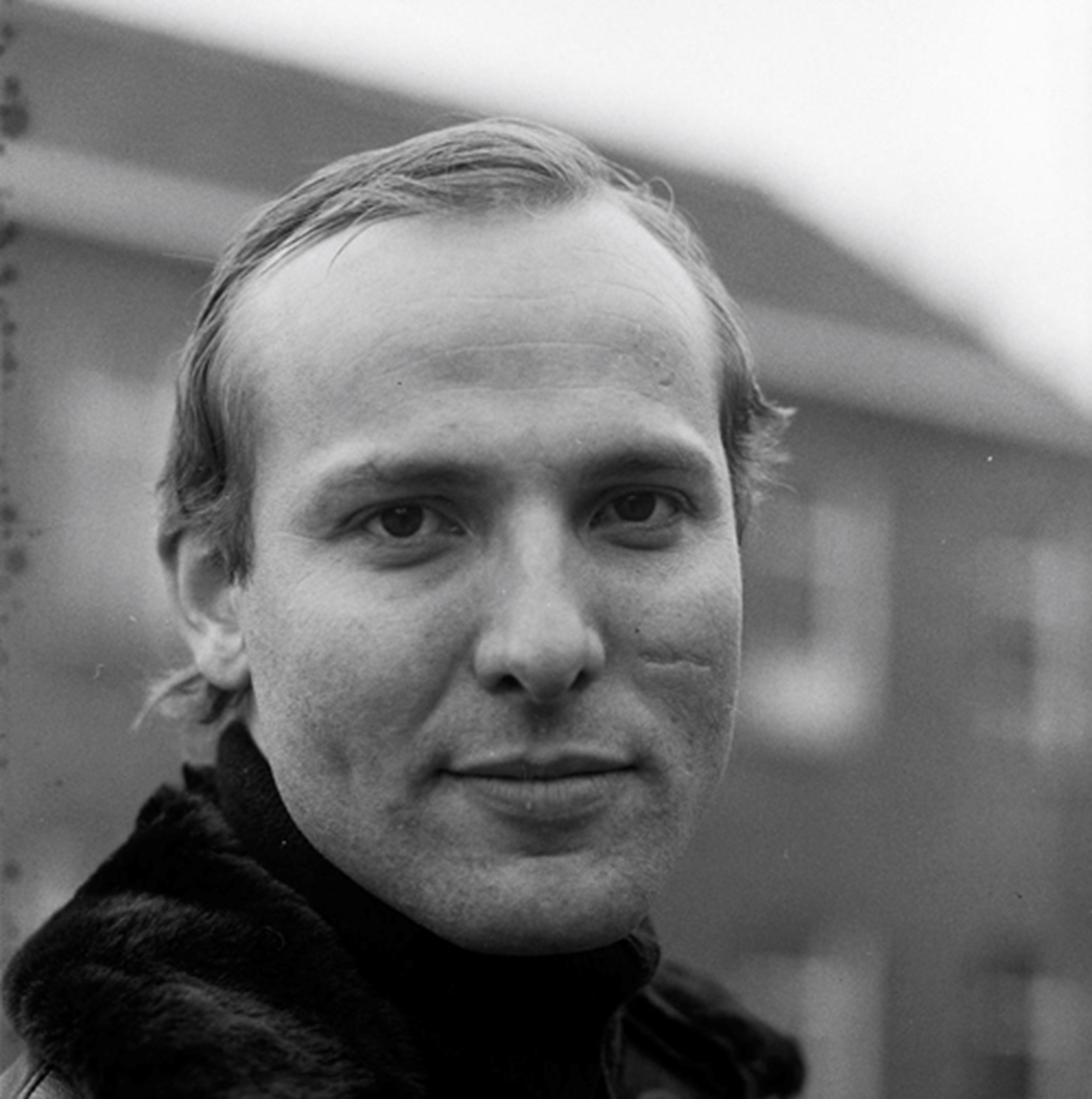
Uittenbogaard (1975)

Theo Uittenbogaard (born Amstelveen, Nieuwer-Amstel, Netherlands, 1946 – 22 April 2022) was a Dutch radio and television producer who worked for almost all nationwide public networks in the Netherlands from 1965.

== Career ==
Uittenbogaard's training was on-the-job, since no school or academy geared to that profession existed in the Netherlands at that time. He started as a 19-year-old apprentice reporter for a daily radio news-show and he made radio documentaries and variety shows. In 1969, he was invited to contribute to a television magazine, which portrayed interesting ordinary people. He remained working for television over the next decades for a wide variety of shows, as a director, as a contributor, as an editor, as an executive-producer alternately. He created the game show Één van de acht ("One of the Eight"), which became the basis for the BBC game show The Generation Game.

Uittenbogaard traveled the world from Siberia to the Marshall Islands to report, from Panama and Morocco to just around the corner. He did shows and documentaries on countries, people, history, politics, dance and music. In 1984, he directed for VPRO-tv an iconic concerto by Ástor Piazzolla, the renowned bandoneon-player from Argentina. He did a documentary on Boat People from Vietnam. He made a 16-episodes series on Dutch language. He wrote a comedy on housekeeping and about 250 more productions. He retired in 2013, after a 50 year career in media.
