= She Blinded Me with Science =

- UK cover art

Single by Thomas Dolby

from the album The Golden Age of Wireless
- B-side: "One of Our Submarines" (UK): "Flying North" (US); "The Jungle Line (Live)" (UK re-release)
- Released: 25 October 1982 (UK); 15 December 1982 (US); 27 June 1983 (UK re-release)
- Genre: Synth-pop; new wave
- Length: 3:42; 5:09 (extended version)
- Label: Venice in Peril (UK); Capitol (US)
- Songwriters: Thomas Dolby; Jo Kerr
- Producers: Thomas Dolby; Tim Friese-Greene

Thomas Dolby singles chronology
"Windpower" (1982)	"She Blinded Me with Science" (1982)	"One of Our Submarines" (1982)

Music video
- "Thomas Dolby - She Blinded Me With Science" on YouTube

"She Blinded Me with Science" is a song by the English musician Thomas Dolby, released in 1982. It was first released as a single in the United Kingdom on 25 October 1982. It was subsequently included on the EP Blinded by Science and the 1983 re-release of Dolby's debut album The Golden Age of Wireless.

Although viewed as a success in both the United States and Canada, peaking at No. 5 on the Billboard Hot 100 and 2 weeks at No. 1 in Canada's RPM magazine, the song barely managed to score among the Top 50 in Dolby's native United Kingdom, peaking at No. 49 on the UK Singles Chart in 1982.

Dolby is often considered a one-hit wonder in the United States on the basis of the song's chart success there. In 2002, US cable television network VH1 named "She Blinded Me with Science" No. 20 on its list of the "100 Greatest One-hit Wonders". While the song is Dolby's only Top 40 single on the Billboard Hot 100, he has had other songs that scored on the music charts. In 2006, VH1 placed it at No. 76 on their list of "Greatest Songs of the '80s". Then, in 2009, it ranked No. 13 on VH1's "100 Greatest One Hit Wonders of the 80s" list. The song was used as the theme song in the pilot episode of The Big Bang Theory before it was replaced with the "Big Bang Theory Theme" by rock band Barenaked Ladies.

== Background ==
The song features exclamations from the British scientist and TV presenter Magnus Pyke, who repeatedly interjects "Science!" and delivers other lines in a deliberately caricatured mad scientist manner, such as, "Good heavens, Miss Sakamoto, you're beautiful!" The quote "As a known scientist, it would be a bit surprising if the girl blinded me with science" was Pyke actually talking through his character with Dolby. Dolby created the instrumental track for "She Blinded Me With Science" without MIDI and instead played the synthesizers by hand and programmed the drums on a computer.

"She Blinded Me With Science" was not included on the original release of his debut album, The Golden Age of Wireless. Following the commercial success of the single, The Golden Age of Wireless was reissued with the song added to the track list.

When discussing "She Blinded Me With Science" in a 1984 interview with Billboard, Dolby commented that he was "very pleased" with the song, "but something about it also turned me off. I thought it was my most frivolous song, that it wasn't me." He mentioned that he wanted his subsequent work to go in a different direction, saying that "now that I know I can record a song about science with a funky electronic beat, I wanted to work only on songs that I felt had something to communicate."

== Critical reception ==
In a contemporary review of the single, Cashbox likened "She Blinded Me With Science" to the work of Laurie Anderson, calling it a "synthesizer shuffle" with "a strong dance pulse".

== Music video ==
The video for "She Blinded Me with Science" was conceived and storyboarded before the song was written. Dolby added the song title, wrote the song to fit the planned video, and then directed the music video. The video features Magnus Pyke as The Doctor, at "The Home for Deranged Scientists". Much of it was filmed at The Holme near Regent's Park in London, at the time owned and managed by the Crown Estate.

Dolby later said that he wrote the line "Good heavens, Miss Sakamoto" because he wanted a Japanese woman to appear in the video. He was quoted as saying: "I was boldly ahead of the times in fetishizing Asian women." The name is a reference to Ryuichi Sakamoto's wife Akiko Yano, who was in the studio at the time; she had previously sung backing on Dolby's 1982 single "Radio Silence", and he would collaborate with Sakamoto on the single "Field Work" a couple of years later.

== Personnel ==
Credits sourced from Mix

- Thomas Dolby – lead and backing vocals, Roland Jupiter-4, Moog Source, PPG Wave, Simmons programming, Eventide Harmonizer
- Matthew Seligman – Moog Source (bass)
- Tim Friese-Greene – PPG Wave, Eventide Harmonizer
- Kevin Armstrong – electric guitar
- Simon House – violin
- Magnus Pyke – spoken word
- Mutt Lange – backing vocals
- Miriam Stockley – backing vocals

== Chart positions ==
=== Weekly charts ===
Chart (1982)	Peak position
UK Singles (Official Charts)	49

Chart (1983)	Peak position
Australia (Kent Music Report)	19
Canada Top Singles (RPM)	1
Germany (GfK)	52
New Zealand (Recorded Music NZ)	7
South Africa (Springbok Radio)	26
UK Singles (Official Charts)	56
US Billboard Hot 100	5
US Billboard Hot Black Singles	49
US Billboard Hot Dance Club Play	3
US Billboard Top Tracks	6
US Cash Box	4

=== Year-end charts ===
Chart (1983)	Rank
Canada Top Singles (RPM)	11
US Billboard Hot 100	23
US Cash Box	21

== Certifications ==
Region	Certification	Certified units/sales
Canada (Music Canada)	Gold	50,000^{^}
^{^} Shipments figures based on certification alone.

== See also ==
- List of number-one singles of 1983 (Canada)
