= Rosemarie Ford =

English television personality (born 1962)

- Born: Rosemarie Poundford; 5 March 1962 (age 64); Sherburn-in-Elmet, North Yorkshire, England
- Occupations: Actress; singer; dancer; television presenter
- Years active: 1982–present
- Spouse: Robert Lindsay (m. 2006)
- Children: 2

Rosemarie Ford (born Rosemarie Poundford; 5 March 1962) is an English actress, singer, dancer and television presenter.

== Television and film ==
Ford is best known for her stint as the hostess of the BBC 1 game show The Generation Game with Bruce Forsyth from 1990 to 1994. She later hosted Come Dancing, again for the BBC, and frequently sang with the orchestra.

She played the role of Bombalurina in the 1998 film adaptation of the musical Cats.

== Theatre ==
Ford worked as a backing singer for Cliff Richard in his "Live and Guaranteed" Tour in 1988 and danced on stage during "Devil Woman". She has appeared in such stage shows as Cats (as Bombalurina and Grizabella) and Time (as part of Captain Ebony's Retinue). She has also appeared in the shows Juke Box, Me And My Girl, Can-Can and Divorce Me, Darling.

== Awards ==
She was a recipient of the Carl Alan Award in 1999, an industry honour voted for by dance professionals.

== Personal life ==
Ford began a long term relationship with actor Robert Lindsay after he left his previous partner Diana Weston for her. They have two sons, born in 1999 and 2003. The couple got married in a civil ceremony, followed by a blessing in their local church, St Mary's, on 31 December 2006. The family's home is in Denham, Buckinghamshire.
