= Bartlett baronets =

Title in the Baronetage of the United Kingdom

- Escutcheon of the Bartlett baronets of Hardington-Mandeville
- Creation date: 1913; 113 years ago
- Status: dormant
- Motto: Fortitudine et fidelitate, With fortitude and fidelity

The Bartlett baronetcy, of Hardington-Mandeville in the County of Somerset, is a title in the Baronetage of the United Kingdom. It was created on 7 February 1913 for the civil engineer and contractor Herbert Bartlett.

As of 2026 the baronetcy is considered dormant.

== Bartlett baronets, of Hardington-Mandeville (1913) ==
- Sir Herbert Henry Bartlett, 1st Baronet (1842–1921)
- Sir Basil Hardington Bartlett, 2nd Baronet (1905–1985)
- Sir (Henry) David Hardington Bartlett, 3rd Baronet (1912–1989)
- Sir John Hardington Bartlett, 4th Baronet (1938–1998).
- Andrew Alan Bartlett, presumed 5th Baronet (born 1964), succeeded his father in 1998, but his name does not appear on the Official Roll.

The heir presumptive is the presumed 5th Baronet's brother Stephen Mark Bartlett (born 1975).

== Notes ==
Baronetage of the United Kingdom
Preceded by Runchorelal baronets	Bartlett baronets of Hardington-Mandeville; 7 February 1913	Succeeded by Caird baronets
