= Magnus Pyke =

English nutritional scientist

Magnus Pyke OBE FRSE FRIC
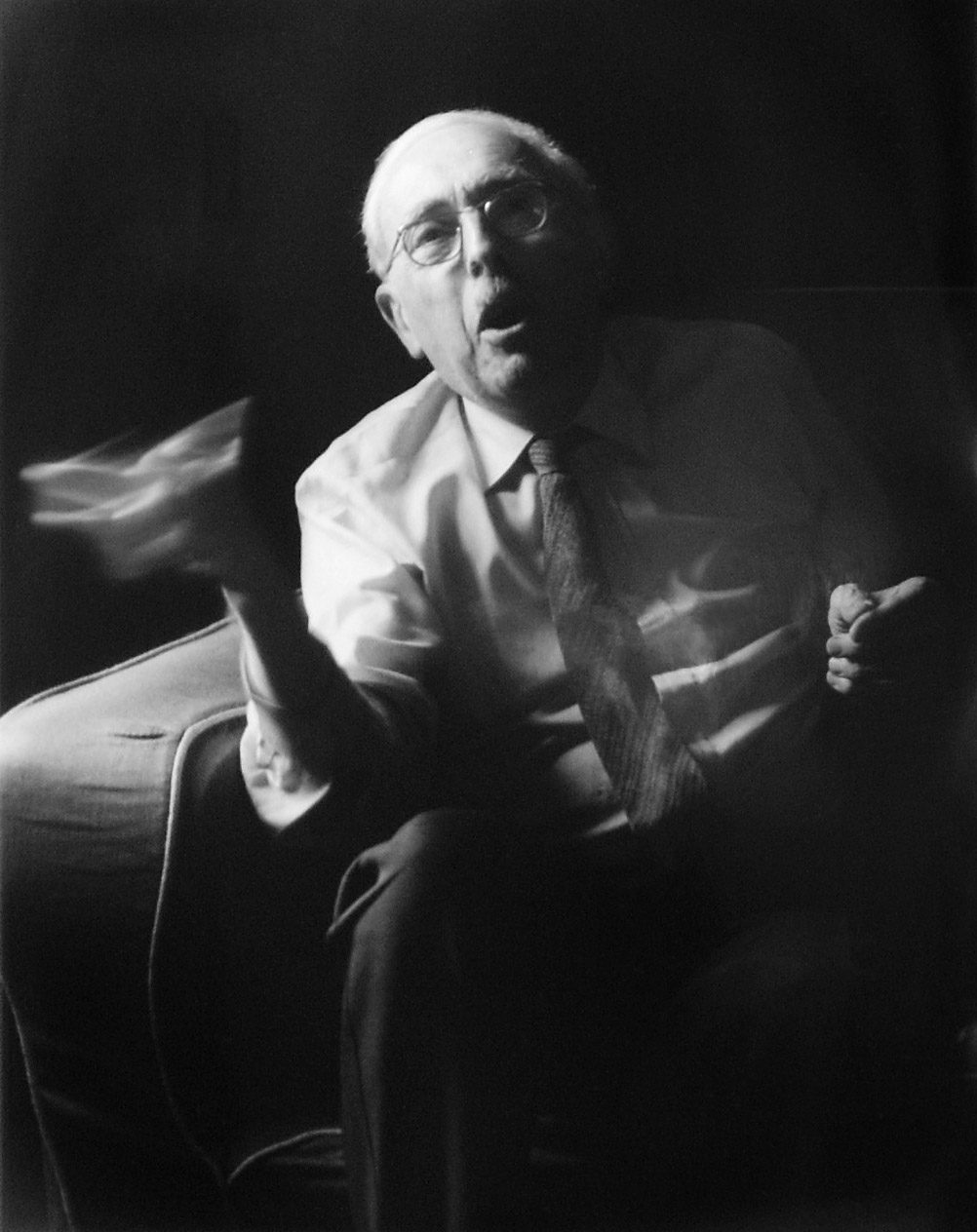
- Pyke at home in 1987
- Born: Magnus Alfred Pyke; 29 December 1908; Paddington, London, England
- Died: 19 October 1992 (aged 83); Wandsworth, London, England
- Education: McGill University, Montreal; University College London
- Spouse: Dorothea Vaughan (m. 1937; died 1986)
- Children: 2
- Scientific career
- Fields: Nutritionist

Magnus Alfred Pyke OBE FRSE FRIC (29 December 1908 – 19 October 1992) was an English nutritional scientist, governmental scientific adviser, writer and presenter. He worked for the UK Ministry of Food, the post-war Allied Commission for Austria, and different food manufacturers. He wrote prolifically and became famous as a TV and radio personality, and was featured on Thomas Dolby's 1982 synth-pop hit, "She Blinded Me with Science".

== Early life and scientific career ==
Pyke was born at Gloucester Terrace, Paddington, London, the son of Clara Hannah Lewis and Robert Bond Pyke, manager of a wholesale confectionery business. He went to St. Paul's School, Barnes, London, where he found he had a "certain bounciness combined with a lack of self-consciousness."

He worked briefly for an insurance company before moving to Canada to attend Macdonald College, McGill University, Montreal, studying agriculture, gaining a BSc in 1933. During summers there, he worked as a farm labourer. He remained in Canada for seven years.

He returned to the UK and in 1934 became chief chemist at Vitamins Ltd., Hammersmith, London. He worked with Professor J.C.Drummond of University College, London on vitamin research. He gained a Ph.D. in biochemistry in 1936.

On 23 August 1937 he married Dorothea Mina Vaughan (1907–1986), an accountant. They had a daughter and a son.

== Wartime scientific career ==
In 1941 Pyke joined Professor Drummond at the Ministry of Food where Drummond was scientific adviser. They studied the nutritional effects of food restrictions due to wartime shortages. He lectured on practical nutrition for those working in institutions that provided food: these lectures were published by H.M. Stationery Office under the title The Manual of Nutrition (1945); the revised 12th edition is still in print, published by the Food Standards Agency. He supported the idea of using rose hip syrup to replace imported orange juice. He was a scientific adviser to the Allied Commission for Austria in 1945–6, after which he worked as Principal Scientific officer at the Ministry of Food (1946–1948), continuing to work on institutional diets and nutritional education.

== Later scientific career ==
Pyke joined The Distillers Company in 1949 as the deputy manager of the yeast research division at Glenochil Research Station, Clackmannanshire. In 1955 he became manager, retiring in 1973.

== Promotion of science ==
Pyke became chairman of the Nutrition Society (Scotland) (1954–1955), a Fellow of the Royal Society of Edinburgh (1956), council member of the Institute of Biology (1959–1962), council member of the Society of Chemical Industry (1967–69) and president of the Institute of Food Science & Technology (1969–77).

He became a council member of the British Association for the Advancement of Science in 1968, then secretary, and finally chairman in 1973, a position he held until 1977. He claimed that food manufacturers provided a social service and defended them against accusations of providing unhealthy products.

== Publications ==
Pyke wrote dozens of scientific papers and publications on food and nutrition, and their links to technology and social change. A list of his published books is below.

- Manual of Nutrition (1947)
- Townsman's Food (1952)
- Automation: Its Purpose and Future (1957)
- Nothing Like Science (1957)
- About Chemistry (1959)
- Slaves Unaware?: A mid-century View of Applied Science (1959)
- Nutrition (Teach Yourself Books) (1961)
- The Science Myth (1962)
- The Boundaries of Science (1963)
- The Science Century (1967)
- Food & Society (1968)
- The Human Predicament: An anthology with questions by Cedric Blackman (1968)
- Man and Food (1970) World University Library
- Food Science and Technology (1970)
- Synthetic Food (1970) John Murray
- Technological Eating: Or, Where does the fish-finger point? (1972)
- Catering Science and Technology (1974)
- Success in Nutrition (1975)
- Butter Side Up!: The Delights of Science (1976)
- There and Back (1978)
- Long life: Expectations for Old Age (1980)
- Our Future: Dr Magnus Pyke Predicts (1980)
- Everyman's Scientific Facts and Feats (with Patrick Moore) (1981)
- Food for All the Family (1981)
- The Six Lives of Pyke [autobiography] (1981)
- Red Rag to a Bull! (1983)
- Curiouser and Curiouser: Dr. Magnus Pyke's Amazing A-Z of Scientific Facts (1983)
- Weird & Wonderful Science Facts (1985)
- Dr.Magnus Pyke's 101 Inventions (1986)

== Broadcasting career ==
Pyke's early broadcasts were from April 1953 in talks about science and technology on the BBC's Home Service, Third Programme (later Radio 3), Light Programme and the educational programming of Network Three; later he also broadcast on Radio 2 and Radio 4. In 1974, he appeared on Yorkshire Television's Don't Ask Me and then Don't Just Sit There (until 1980), in which he and other experts such as David Bellamy, Rob Buckman and Miriam Stoppard answered popular science questions. His exuberant delivery, with very animated and passionate speech and gesticulation, made him famous. He was a panellist on radio programmes such as Any Questions? and Just a Minute and a guest on Desert Island Discs. He called this period his "sixth life".

In September 1975, the popular science magazine New Scientist asked its readers to name the best-known and most characteristic scientist. Pyke came third after Isaac Newton and Albert Einstein. On 10 December 1975, Pyke was celebrated on This Is Your Life, a Thames Television production for ITV. He won the Pye Colour Television Award for most promising male newcomer to television (1975) and the Multi-Coloured Swap Shop Star Award for expert of the year (1977–1978).

=== TV appearances ===
(all as himself unless otherwise indicated)

- The Fifty-One Society (1960)
- A Suspicion of Poison (1962)
- Can Man Be Modified? (1965)
- The Eamonn Andrews Show (1966)
- Parkinson (1971)
- Don't Ask Me (1974–1975)
- This is Your Life (1975)
- Whodunnit? (1975–1978)
- Celebrity Squares (1976)
- The Big Time (1976)
- For Schools, Colleges: Biology: The Energy Chain (1976)
- It's Patently Obvious (1976–1989)
- The Bob Braun Show (1977)
- M'Lords...Ladies and Gentlemen (1978)
- Larry Grayson's Generation Game, untransmitted pilot (1978)
- 3-2-1 (1978–1980)
- Lenny and Jerry's Holiday Special (1978)
- Jim'll Fix It (1978)
- Multi-Coloured Swap Shop (1978)
- It's a Celebrity Knockout (1978–1980)
- For Schools, Colleges: Design by Five 1: "A Kitchen for Magnus Pyke, designed by John Wealleans" (1979)
- Lenny and Jerry (1979)
- The Lenny and Jerry Show (1979)
- The Basil Brush Show (1979)
- Star Games (1979)
- Don't Just Sit There (1979–1980)
- Watch this Space (as "Skwirt") (1980)
- Does the Team Think? (1982)
- Q.E.D. (1982)
- 16 Up: How Do I Look? (1982)
- On Safari (1982)
- "She Blinded Me with Science" (1982)
- Windmill (1985–1986)
- Through the Keyhole (1987)
- Scoff (1988)

== Awards ==
He received honorary doctoral degrees from the University of Stirling (1974), Lancaster University (1976) and his alma mater, McGill University (1981). In 1978 he was appointed an Officer of the Order of the British Empire.

== Retirement ==
Pyke retired from regular broadcasting in 1980, save for occasional TV appearances. He nursed his wife at home in Hammersmith until her death in 1986. He survived a brutal robbery at his home in 1988 that left him badly injured. He died on 19 October 1992 at Elmsbank Nursing Home, Carlton Drive, Wandsworth, London.

In 1982, Pyke was featured on Thomas Dolby's synth-pop hit, "She Blinded Me with Science", as a doctor at the "Home for Deranged Scientists", appearing prominently in the accompanying video. The song features exclamations from Pyke, who repeatedly interjects "Science!" and delivers other lines in a deliberately caricatured mad scientist manner, such as, "Good heavens, Miss Sakamoto, you're beautiful!"

== See also ==
- Geoffrey Pyke (first cousin)
