= Tell the Truth (British game show) =

1957 British TV game show (1957–1961, 1983–1990)

- Created by: Bob Stewart
- Presented by: David Jacobs (1957–58); McDonald Hobley (1958); Shaw Taylor (1959–61); Graeme Garden (1983–85); Fred Dinenage (1989–90)
- Country of origin: United Kingdom
- Original language: English
- No. of series: 3 (ATV); 4 (Channel 4); 3 (TVS)
- No. of episodes: 76 (ATV); 51 (Channel 4); 92 (TVS)

Production
- Running time: 30 minutes (inc. adverts)
- Production companies: ATV (1957–61); LWT in association with Goodson-Todman Productions and Talbot Television (1983–85); TVS in association with Mark Goodson Productions and Talbot Television (1989–90)

Original release
- Network: ITV
- Release: 17 September 1957 – 6 September 1961
- Network: Channel 4
- Release: 17 April 1983 – 22 November 1985
- Network: ITV
- Release: 11 April 1989 – 26 October 1990

Related
- To Tell the Truth

Tell the Truth is a panel game show based on the US version, To Tell the Truth. It was originally aired on ITV and produced by ATV from 17 September 1957 to 6 September 1961. Hosted first by David Jacobs in 1957, McDonald Hobley took over as host from July 1958. Shaw Taylor took over as host from 1959 to 1961.

It was then revived on Channel 4 in 1983, produced by LWT in association with Goodson-Todman Productions and Talbot Television until November 1985. During this time it was hosted by Graeme Garden and then finally aired back on ITV produced by TVS in association with Mark Goodson Productions and Talbot Television from 11 April 1989 to 26 October 1990, during which time it was hosted by Fred Dinenage.

== Transmissions ==
=== ATV era ===
Series	Start date	End date	Episodes
1	17 September 1957	9 September 1958	51
2	1 June 1959	7 September 1959	14
3	28 June 1961	6 September 1961	11

None of the ATV episodes survived.

=== Channel 4 era ===
Series	Start date	End date	Episodes
1	17 April 1983	3 July 1983	12
2	16 October 1983	1 January 1984	11
3	21 September 1984	25 January 1985	16
4	6 September 1985	22 November 1985	12

All 51 Channel 4 episodes survived.

=== TVS era ===
Series	Start date	End date	Episodes
1	11 April 1989	2 June 1989	32
2	17 October 1989	1 December 1989	28
3	4 September 1990	26 October 1990	32

None of the TVS episodes survived.
