= Berkeley Smith =

Berkeley Alexander Smith (8 December 1918 – 22 April 2003) was a broadcaster and a senior figure in the television world for nearly 40 years.

== Birth ==
Born in Bournemouth, he was the son of Malcolm George Walters Smith, who was a Gunner with the Royal Garrison Artillery. His mother was Elsie Frances Smith, formerly Elsie Frances Robinson.

== Early career ==
Educated at Blundell's School and the University of St Andrews, on the outbreak of World War II he quit his studies and was commissioned into the Royal Artillery, serving in the Western Desert and then in Burma.

Following D-Day, the army in Burma began to think of itself as the "Forgotten Army", and Smith was sent back to England to lecture on the Burmese campaign. He was so successful that he was next sent to the United States to do the same in front of an American audience. Following this, for six months he was British press liaison officer during the Nuremberg trials.

== Broadcasting career ==
Finally demobilised in 1946, Smith sought a career in broadcasting on the back of his communication skills. He joined the BBC, starting in outside radio broadcasts. Three years later he took a producer's job in the equivalent television department.

As the service grew, sport became an important part of the BBC's output, and Smith was soon interviewing golf champions on camera as well as producing the programme. In the historic coverage of the Coronation of Queen Elizabeth II in 1953, Smith was one of the commentators, stationed on the Victoria Memorial, London. In 1955, he became head of the department.

Though a senior figure in television for nearly forty years, Smith only appeared in front of the cameras himself a few times in the 1950s, most memorably as one of the BBC's gentlemen-callers who descended on celebrities of the day for a quaint programme called At Home. This was one of the BBC's steadfast programmes. It was broadcast live from the seats of the eminent or titled. He took over from Richard Dimbleby, the original caller who had given the programme a respectful tone. But, according to his obituary, Smith was altogether "cheerier, breezier and renowned as a charmer. When he went calling, his manner conveyed a faint threat that he might stir his tea with his pencil or absent-mindedly pinch her ladyship's bottom, thus giving the proceedings a hint of the danger that all good live TV needs". On one occasion he was received by the butler, who ushered him into the drawing room with the words, "The television, your lordship."

In 1957 he provided the UK commentary at the Eurovision Song Contest.

In 1958, Smith transferred his talents in the same position as chief of outside broadcasts to the newly enfranchised ITV contractor, Southern Television. Amongst his achievements there, he set up the relay of opera from Glyndebourne and Covent Garden. In 1964 he became Southern's programme controller; he was so successful that, in the contract reshuffle four years later, Southern was one of the few companies to have its contract unconditionally renewed. Smith and his team were singled out for praise.

He represented the ITV companies in meetings at the European Broadcasting Union, acting as chairman of their religious sub-committee. At that time the committee was there to ensure that only suitable programmes should fill the break in the Sunday evening schedules in order to protect church services. His final appointment was as head of the secretariat of the independent television companies' association (1976–84).

== Retirement ==
He retired in 1983, and devoted himself to his house and garden in Hampshire. Later he moved to Abergavenny to be near his son. He was a passionate golfer, and though he never returned to St Andrews to complete his degree course, he did become a member of The Royal and Ancient Golf Club of St Andrews. He loved entertaining, travel, good food and wine. According to his obituary, "by general consent he was excellent company".

Both his marriages (firstly to Penelope Harling and secondly to Shirley Horton) were dissolved. By his first wife he left a son and two daughters. His step-grandson is the 'Guardian' columnist Matthew Norman.

Preceded by Wilfrid Thomas	Eurovision Song Contest UK Commentator; 1957	Succeeded by Peter Haigh
