= The Generation Game =

BBC television game show (1971–2018)

- Also known as: Bruce Forsyth and the Generation Game (1971–1977); Larry Grayson's Generation Game (1978–1982); Bruce Forsyth's Generation Game (1990–1994); Jim Davidson's Generation Game (1995–2002); Generation Fame (2005)
- Genre: Game show
- Created by: Theo Uittenbogaard; Mies Bouwman
- Presented by: Bruce Forsyth (1971–1977, 1990–1994); Roy Castle (stand-in, 1975); Larry Grayson (1978–1982); Jim Davidson (stand-in, 1994; regular, 1995–2002); Graham Norton (2005); Mel and Sue (2018)
- Starring: Anthea Redfern (1971–1977); Jenny Lee-Wright (stand-in, 1974); Isla St Clair (1978–1982); Rosemarie Ford (1990–1994); Sally Meen (1995); Melanie Stace (1996–2001); Lea Kristensen (2001–2002)
- Opening theme: "Life Is The Name Of The Game" (1971–1977, 1990–1994) "Karn Evil 9 1st Impression, Part 2" by Emerson, Lake & Palmer (1998–2002)
- Country of origin: United Kingdom
- Original language: English
- No. of series: 23
- No. of episodes: 362 (inc. 59 specials)

Production
- Production locations: BBC Television Theatre (1971–1982); BBC Television Centre (1990–2002)
- Running time: 45–65 minutes

Original release
- Network: BBC1
- Release: 2 October 1971 – 3 January 1982
- Release: 7 September 1990 – 20 April 2002
- Release: 31 December 2005
- Release: 1 April – 8 April 2018

The Generation Game is a British game show produced by the BBC in which four teams of two people from the same family, but different generations, compete to win prizes.

== The game ==
There are eight competitors, hence the catchphrase "Let's meet the eight who are going to generate" used in earlier series by Bruce Forsyth. The couples were a generation apart and in later series, but not originally, of different genders. Most of the time it was mother/son, father/daughter. Sometimes aunt/nephew and uncle/niece played. In the first two rounds, two couples compete against each other in two games. One game usually involves first seeing a skilled professional construct or perform something, such as pottery or dancing. The contestants attempt to do the same, and a score is given by the professional. The other game usually involves more of a quiz element, such as identifying pieces of music. At the end of each of the first two rounds, the couple with the lowest score is eliminated.

The two highest-scoring couples compete against each other in the final (or End Game, as Larry Grayson referred to it). This is often a big set-piece performance; in the series presented by Forsyth it was usually a drama or farce (in which many elements were deliberately choreographed to go wrong in order to generate more comedy), in later programmes a musical or dance performance. The couple that scores the highest go through to the final 'conveyor belt'. Originally, this was scored the same way in the first rounds, but when Davidson took over, the winner was decided by an audience vote, apart from in his penultimate series when the winner was decided on points scored.

At the end of the show, one member (both members during the second Forsyth era) of the victorious team watches prizes pass on a conveyor belt, and wins as many as could be recalled in 45 seconds (20 seconds per teammate during the second Forsyth era), with some items awarding a bonus prize if the contestant or team recalls that item. In both the first Forsyth era and the Grayson era, a short quiz between the two team members decided who would play the conveyor belt, whilst in the Davidson era, the winning team decided themselves on who would play.

A trademark of the show is that a cuddly toy is always among the prizes. This led to an affectionate joke: "Dinner service...fondue set...Cuddly toy! Cuddly toy!", which is sometimes quoted when the show is mentioned. The audience and the host shout out the names of the prizes, especially in later series, allowing the contestants to carry away large numbers of items. In the fifth series of Davidson's run, an added twist involved four prizes being referred to as "phantom prizes", if the contestant was to mention those, gunge would be hurled at them every time one was recalled.

In the Jim Davidson run, if contestants correctly recalled 15 of the 20 prizes in 45 seconds (later 60), they won everything and the star prize, which was a holiday. In Davidson's final two series, each point scored by the winning team became one second.

== History ==
=== 1971–1977: Origins and first Bruce Forsyth era ===
The show is based on the Dutch TV show Één van de acht ("One of the Eight"), the format devised in 1969 by Theo Uittenbogaard for VARA Television. Mies Bouwman, a Dutch talk show host and presenter of the show, came up with the idea of the conveyor belt. She had seen it on a German programme and wanted to incorporate it into the show.

Another antecedent for the game show was Sunday Night at the London Palladium on ATV, which had a game called Beat the Clock, taken from an American game show of the same name. It featured married couples playing silly games within a certain time to win prize money. This was hosted by Bruce Forsyth from 1958, and he took the idea with him when he went over to the BBC.

During the 1970s, game shows became more popular and started to replace expensive variety shows. As a result, many variety performers were recruited for game shows. The BBC, suffering poor ratings, decided to make its own game show. Bill Cotton, the BBC's Head of Light Entertainment, believed that Forsyth was best for the job. For years, The Generation Game was one of the strongest shows in the BBC's Saturday night line-up, and became the number-one game show on British television during the 1970s, regularly gaining over 21 million viewers. Its theme song "Life Is The Name Of The Game" was written and sung by Forsyth, and later released on record.

=== 1978–1982: Larry Grayson era ===
In the mid-1970s London Weekend Television recruited Forsyth to host The Big Night on Saturdays. Alan Boyd, producer of The Generation Game at the time, remembers that there were many proposals as to who should take over, with Bill Cotton having a brief discussion with his favoured choice, Cilla Black, who would not consider the move; other names mentioned included Jimmy Tarbuck and Kenneth Williams. However, he felt he did not want the new programme to be compared to Forsyth's Generation Game, so he cast Larry Grayson, with a new theme tune, which incorporated Grayson's "shut that door" catchphrase. There was also new scenery, and a new co-host, Isla St Clair. It worked, as The Big Night failed to beat The Generation Game in viewing figures and was off the air within three months.

The show reached its peak under Grayson. It attracted an audience of 25 million on one occasion, when the 1979 ITV strike broke out. Grayson's apparent incompetence and inability to remember what was going on was carefully contrived. In 1980, a junior version was considered, to be titled The Younger Generation Game, with two young siblings of different ages in place of older contestants. It was not confirmed whether Grayson would have hosted this proposed spin-off version, and it was not commissioned.

=== Cancellation ===
By the early 1980s, The Generation Game was being beaten by LWT's Game for a Laugh. The show continued through to the end of 1981, but shortly before a highlights episode from the last series aired on 3 January 1982, Grayson decided to quit whilst the show was still popular. The BBC approached Jimmy Tarbuck to present the show, but he turned it down, in favour of being offered Live From Her Majesty's on ITV. The series was later cancelled.

=== 1990–2002 revival: Second Bruce Forsyth and Jim Davidson eras ===
The Generation Game returned in September 1990 with the original host, Bruce Forsyth, and his new hostess, Rosemarie Ford. After leaving the show for a second time in 1994 to move to ITV, Forsyth was replaced by Jim Davidson, who had previously stood in on an edition when Forsyth was unwell. The show became more lively, silly and chaotic during the Davidson era, introducing characters such as Mr Blobby, comedy sketches, and gunge similarly seen on Tiswas, with appearances from the Phantom Flan Flinger. Davidson's hostesses were Sally Meen, Melanie Stace and Lea Kristensen. This incarnation ended in April 2002, after again being beaten by ITV, this time by Pop Idol. Davidson had announced in March that he was quitting the show. The series ended the following month.

=== Later revivals ===
==== 2003–2005: Paul O'Grady pilots and Graham Norton special ====
The BBC were planning on reviving the show with Paul O'Grady as its new presenter in 2004. Filming two non-broadcast pilot episodes in 2003, both O'Grady and the production team were unhappy with the result, with O'Grady leaving the project. Graham Norton hosted a one-off special at Christmas 2005 featuring celebrity contestants Kelly Holmes, Davina McCall, Rupert Grint and James Fleet; this was titled Generation Fame.

==== 2007 retrospective ====
The Generation Game returned with original host Forsyth in 2007 under the title Brucie's Generation Game: Now and Then, broadcast on UKTV Gold. This version was a retrospective of earlier editions, similar to the digital channel's Wogan and Jim'll Fix It revivals around the same time.

==== 2011: David Walliams's 24 Hour Panel People ====
In 2011, a version of the show featured as part of David Walliams's 24 Hour Panel People, a charity marathon of game shows for Comic Relief. Walliams competed with his mother Kathleen. The other team consisted of Miranda Hart and Patricia Hodge, who play mother and daughter in the sitcom Miranda. Vernon Kay presented the episode.

==== 2014–2015: Miranda Hart discussions ====
On 20 April 2014, it was announced that comedian Miranda Hart (who appeared on the 2011 charity special) was in "early talks" with the BBC about hosting a revived version of the show. A pilot episode was filmed before Christmas that year, but the controller of the channel, Charlotte Moore, revealed in August 2015 that the project was "very much on hold" due to Hart wanting to concentrate on her acting and writing career.

==== 2017–2018: Mel and Sue ====
On 11 May 2017, it was reported that Mel and Sue were linked to host a reboot for the BBC as part of a package for not staying with The Great British Bake Off after its move to Channel 4. On 23 July 2017, it was confirmed that Mel and Sue would host. However, on 7 February 2018, two episodes instead of the planned four were confirmed, with the BBC saying "During the production process it's not unusual for a new series to change length as the format evolves".

The first episode aired on BBC One on 1 April 2018. It received generally poor reviews from TV critics: Gerard O'Donovan from The Daily Telegraph gave it one star, writing: "...There's little to say other than that it was a shameless carbon copy of memorable moments from The Generation Game of the 1970s or 80s." Carol Midgley of The Times gave it two stars, saying: "It needs to relax and dial down the gush. Brucie made it look so easy. Didn't he do well?" The i newspaper's Jeff Robinson said the show "felt forced and scripted, another territory for the Mel and Sue brand to colonise post-Bake Off rather than an original updating of an old format." Sam Wollaston of The Guardian was more positive, giving it three stars and writing: "Somehow, it manages to be both a little bit glorious and groansome to the max at the same time."

== Catchphrases ==
The show introduced a number of catchphrases, including Bruce Forsyth's "Didn't he/she/they do well?", "Let's meet the eight who are going to generate" and "Let's have a look at the old scoreboard". Later, when the show was revived, Forsyth's assistant was Rosemarie Ford, so the catchphrase was amended to "What's on the board, Miss Ford?" (originally "What have they scored, Miss Ford?"). Forsyth always opened the show with "Good evening Ladies Gentlemen and Children welcome to the Generation Game, it's Nice to see you, to see you ..." to which the audience would shout "Nice!", a catchphrase that Forsyth retained in his later television appearances. Others included "Good game, good game," "I hope you're playing this at home," and "Give us a twirl," which was said to hostess Anthea Redfern to show off her dress.

Grayson supplied his own catchphrases, including "Shut that door!", "What a gay day!" and "Seems like a nice boy!" Scores were preceded by "What are the scores on the doors?" to which St Clair would reply "The names in the frames say..." before announcing them. After the conveyor belt finale, Grayson would say "What a lot you've got... you have got a lot!" but he abandoned this after his second season as it did not register with the public. Grayson and St Clair apparently had a strong bond; Grayson always introduced her at the start of each show as "my lovely Isla" and "my favourite girl, my Saturday girl." She once referred to them as being "like a couple of naughty sisters."

Jim Davidson would later present but no real catchphrases were used; however, he made a running gag acknowledging this and tried out several 'potential catchphrases'.

== Hostesses ==
Each host of The Generation Game was joined by a female hostess, who brought the contestants on stage, handed out the prizes and often joined in the games. The first was Anthea Redfern, who began an affair with host Forsyth and married him during the series' run. When she was absent on maternity leave, actress Jenny Lee Wright stood in for a number of shows. Isla St. Clair was Grayson's hostess throughout his tenure on the show. Rosemarie Ford supported Forsyth on his second stint as host. Sally Meen, Melanie Stace and Lea Kristensen were Davidson's hostesses.

== Merchandise ==
=== Board games ===
In 1975, Strawberry Fayre and Denys Fisher published a board game (simply called Generation Game with host Bruce Forsyth on the cover) featuring a three-dimensional diorama of the set, a working countdown clock and the famous sliding doors.

In 1990, Rainbow Games published another board game (only this time as Bruce Forsyth's Generation Game still with Forsyth on the cover).

=== Books ===
In 1992, a book called Bruce Forsyth's Generation Game Book: Games, Quizzes, and D-I-Y (Do It Yourself) Fun for All the Family was published by Vermillion.

== International versions ==
In addition to the original Dutch version and long-running British version, Rudi Carrell hosted the German version Am laufenden Band from 1974 to 1979 on Das Erste. There was also a Swedish version, Tjocka Släkten, presented by Lasse Berghagen and Inga Gill from 1990 to 1991, and a French version, Salut les artites, presented by Georges Beller and Krystina Ferentz in 1993. In 2008 a South African version of the show was made, hosted by comedian Barry Hilton together with actress/presenter Cindy Nkabinde on channel SABC 2.

| Country | Name | Presenter | Channel | Date premiered | Date ended |
|---|---|---|---|---|---|
| Germany | Am laufenden Band | Rudi Carrell | Das Erste | 27 April 1974 | 1979 |
| Germany | Am laufenden Band | Florian Silbereisen | Das Erste | 2 December 2006 | |
| Germany | Am laufenden Band | Jörg Pilawa | Das Erste | 22 December 2014 (pilot) | |
| Germany | Die Post geht ab!: Am laufenden Band | Rudi Carrell | RTL | 9 May 1993 | 11 July 1993 |
| Netherlands (original version) | Eén van de Acht | Mies Bouwman | VARA | 1970 | 1974 |
| Netherlands (original version) | Eén van de Acht | Mies Bouwman | AVRO | January 1976 | 1976 |
| Netherlands (original version) | Eén van de Acht | Jos Brink | RTL 4 | 1990 | 1990 |
| Netherlands (original version) | Eén van de Acht | Lucie de Lange | RTL 4 | 1990 | 1990 |
| Netherlands (original version) | Eén van de Acht | Paul de Leeuw | AVRO | 1995 | |
| Netherlands (original version) | Eén van de Acht | Henny Huisman | EO | 2008 | |
| South Africa | The Generation Game | Barry Hilton | SABC 2 | 2008 | 2008 |
| South Africa | The Generation Game | Cindy Nkabinde | SABC 2 | 2008 | 2008 |
| Sweden | Tjocka släkten | Lasse Berghagen | SVT1 | 1991 | 1992 |
| Sweden | Tjocka släkten | Inga Gill | SVT1 | 1991 | 1992 |
| France | Salut les artistes | Georges Beller | France 2 | 1993 | 1993 |
| France | Salut les artistes | Krystina Ferentz | France 2 | 1993 | 1993 |

== Transmissions ==
=== Original ===
==== Bruce Forsyth ====
===== Series =====
| Series | Start date | End date | Episodes |
|---|---|---|---|
| 1 | 2 October 1971 | 31 December 1971 | 13 |
| 2 | 16 September 1972 | 1 January 1973 | 15 |
| 3 | 15 September 1973 | 26 January 1974 | 19 |
| 4 | 21 September 1974 | 1 February 1975 | 19 |
| 5 | 27 September 1975 | 20 December 1975 | 13 |
| 6 | 11 September 1976 | 18 December 1976 | 15 |
| 7 | 10 September 1977 | 17 December 1977 | 15 |

===== Specials =====
| Date | Title |
|---|---|
| 25 December 1971 | Christmas Special |
| 28 May 1972 | Holiday Special |
| 9 September 1972 | Series 1 Compilation |
| 25 December 1972 | Christmas Special |
| 8 September 1973 | Series 2 Compilation |
| 25 December 1973 | Christmas Special |
| 29 December 1973 | Series 1, 2 & 3 Compilation |
| 14 September 1974 | Series 3 Compilation |
| 25 December 1974 | Christmas Special |
| 28 December 1974 | Series 4 Compilation (Part 1) |
| 20 September 1975 | Series 4 Compilation (Part 2) |
| 25 December 1975 | Christmas Special |
| 1 January 1976 | New Year Special |
| 4 September 1976 | Series 5 Compilation |
| 25 December 1976 | Christmas Special |
| 3 September 1977 | Series 6 Compilation |
| 25 December 1977 | Christmas Special |
| 31 December 1977 | Series 7 Compilation |

==== Larry Grayson ====
===== Series =====
| Series | Start date | End date | Episodes |
|---|---|---|---|
| 1 (8) | 23 September 1978 | 16 December 1978 | 13 |
| 2 (9) | 8 September 1979 | 15 December 1979 | 15 |
| 3 (10) | 30 August 1980 | 13 December 1980 | 16 |
| 4 (11) | 5 September 1981 | 19 December 1981 | 16 |

===== Specials =====
| Date | Title |
|---|---|
| 25 December 1978 | Christmas Special |
| 31 December 1978 | Series 1 Compilation |
| 16 April 1979 | Easter Special |
| 1 September 1979 | Scarborough Special |
| 25 December 1979 | Christmas Special |
| 31 December 1979 | Series 2 Compilation |
| 7 April 1980 | Easter Special |
| 25 December 1980 | Christmas Special |
| 31 December 1980 | Series 3 Compilation |
| 20 April 1981 | Easter Special |
| 25 December 1981 | Christmas Special |
| 3 January 1982 | Series 4 Compilation |

=== Revival ===
==== Bruce Forsyth ====
===== Series =====
| Series | Start date | End date | Episodes |
|---|---|---|---|
| 1 (12) | 7 September 1990 | 7 December 1990 | 13 |
| 2 (13) | 14 September 1991 | 21 December 1991 | 15 |
| 3 (14) | 19 September 1992 | 2 January 1993 | 14 |
| 4 (15) | 10 September 1993 | 17 December 1993 | 14 |
| 5 (16) | 10 September 1994 | 17 December 1994 | 15 |

===== Specials =====
| Date | Title |
|---|---|
| 23 November 1990 | Children in Need Special |
| 25 December 1990 | Christmas Special |
| 7 September 1991 | Series 1 Compilation |
| 22 November 1991 | Children in Need Special |
| 25 December 1991 | Christmas Special |
| 5 September 1992 | Series 2 Compilation |
| 25 December 1992 | Christmas Special |
| 3 September 1993 | Series 3 Compilation |
| 24 December 1993 | Christmas Special |
| 3 September 1994 | Series 4 Compilation |
| 24 December 1994 | Christmas Special |

==== Jim Davidson ====
===== Series =====
| Series | Start date | End date | Episodes |
|---|---|---|---|
| 1 (17) | 21 October 1995 | 10 February 1996 | 16 |
| 2 (18) | 31 August 1996 | 14 December 1996 | 16 |
| 3 (19) | 18 October 1997 | 7 March 1998 | 19 |
| 4 (20) | 5 September 1998 | 23 January 1999 | 19 |
| 5 (21) | 4 September 1999 | 5 February 2000 | 18 |
| 6 (22) | 7 October 2000 | 24 February 2001 | 18 |
| 7 (23) | 8 September 2001 | 13 April 2002 | 18 |

===== Specials =====
| Date | Title |
|---|---|
| 23 December 1995 | Christmas Special |
| 22 November 1996 | Children in Need Special |
| 21 December 1996 | Christmas Special |
| 20 December 1997 | Christmas Special |
| 14 March 1998 | Series 2 Compilation |
| 21 March 1998 | Series 3 Compilation |
| 21 November 1998 | Children in Need Special |
| 19 December 1998 | Christmas Special |
| 30 January 1999 | Series 4 Compilation |
| 1 September 1999 | Cuddly Toys and Conveyor Belts |
| 24 December 1999 | Christmas Special |
| 1 January 2000 | New Year Special |
| 1 July 2000 | Series 5 Compilation |
| 23 December 2000 | Christmas Special |
| 30 December 2000 | New Year Special |
| 26 May 2001 | Series 6 Compilation |
| 23 December 2001 | Christmas Special |
| 20 April 2002 | Series 7 Compilation |

==== Graham Norton ====
===== Specials =====
| Date | Title |
|---|---|
| 31 December 2005 | Generation Fame |

==== Mel and Sue ====
===== Series =====
| Series | Start date | End date | Episodes |
|---|---|---|---|
| 1 (24) | 1 April 2018 | 8 April 2018 | 2 |
