= Leslie Welch =

Leslie Welch (29 December 1907 – 8 February 1980) was a British radio and television entertainer known as the Memory Man.

== Early life and career ==
Leslie was born in Edmonton, London. Educated at the Latymer School where he was an excellent student who was addicted to sport and spent much of his free time studying sports almanacks such as Wisden and Ruff's Guide to the Turf.

On leaving school he was employed at the Royal Small Arms Factory, Enfield Lock in the Accounts Department.

During the Second World War he served with the Eighth Army in the Western Desert and it was here that his encyclopaedic knowledge of sport was recognised and was signed up by ENSA.

After demob he became popular on radio shows such as Variety Playhouse and In Town Tonight, he was also a regular on TV's Kaleidoscope and made many London Palladium performances. By 1952, he hosted Beat the Memory Man broadcast on Radio Luxembourg.

For his act he simply stood on the stage and talked sport before accepting 'challenges' from the audience, who would call out all kinds of questions which he would normally answer immediately and adding a few more facts and figures.

== Later life ==
Welch never considered himself special and he once said:

It's my belief that everyone was born with a perfect memory, but by the time they are 21, thanks to the invention of pen and paper, they are only using a fifth of it. The other four-fifths has gone dormant like a muscle not being used.

— Leslie Welch

Unfortunately, he found the rigours of his career too great and in 1963 turned his back on the stage and became a civil servant and settled in Ruislip, Middlesex where he later died aged 72.
