= George Cansdale =

British zoologist (1909–1993)

- Born: 11 December 1909; Brentwood, Essex, England
- Died: 24 August 1993 (aged 83); Great Chesterford, Essex, England
- Education: University of Oxford
- Occupations: Zoologist; conservationist/naturalist; writer; television presenter

George Soper Cansdale (29 November 1909 – 24 August 1993) was a British zoologist, writer and television personality. He was Superintendent of the Zoological Society of London, and one of the best-known presenters of wildlife programmes and items on British television between the 1950s and 1980s.

== Life and career ==
He was born in 1909 in Brentwood, Essex and attended Brentwood School before studying for a degree in forestry at St Edmund Hall, Oxford. He then joined the Colonial Service, and in 1934 was appointed as Forestry Officer for the Gold Coast (now Ghana), where he started collecting animals for a friend who worked at Paignton Zoo. He used local children to help him collect specimens, and as a result discovered several new species. He began supplying animals for several zoos, including London Zoo.

In 1947 he was recruited by the Zoological Society of London as their Superintendent, a post which he held until 1953. During that period he began to broadcast for the BBC, on early wildlife programmes such as Heads, Tails and Feet, Looking at Animals and All About Animals, the latter two of which won the Royal Television Society's silver medal in 1952. He also made regular appearances on Children's Hour on BBC radio.

From the 1960s onwards, he was a regular guest on Blue Peter, described by the programme's producer Biddy Baxter as "....television's zoo man - the large, avuncular studio guest who would show the presenters how to bath six-foot pythons, produce bush-babies from his trouser pockets and tarantulas out of his turn-ups....Children loved him because he was quirky, authoritative and uncondescending." The Blue Peter tortoise, George, was affectionately named after him in 1982. David Attenborough paid tribute to Cansdale in 1992, saying that, thanks to Cansdale's bringing animals to the television studios, "a great many people, young and old, acquired their first insights into taxonomy and comparative anatomy from what he said. He spoke good natural science."

In the 1960s Cansdale became Director of Marine Land in Morecambe, Chessington Zoo and Natureland in Skegness. He also developed, with his son, a method of obtaining clean seawater by filtering it through beach sand, and set up a company, SWF Filtration Ltd, which won the international IBM Award for Sustainable Development in 1990.

Cansdale wrote many books for the Ladybird Company.

His books included Animals of West Africa (1946), Animals and Man (1952), George Cansdale's Zoo Book (1953), Belinda the Bushbaby (written with his wife, 1953), Reptiles of West Africa (1955), The Ladybird Book of British Wild Animals (1958), West African Snakes (1961), Behind the Scenes at a Zoo (1965) and Animals of Bible Lands (1965).

== Personal life ==
He married Margaret Williamson, who had been a fellow student at Oxford, in 1940. They were both active Christians. George Cansdale was Churchwarden of All Souls Church, Langham Place, from 1950 to 1971, and President of the evangelical Crusaders Union. He died in Great Chesterford, Essex in 1993 at the age of 83.

He had a well-documented falling out with Gerald Durrell, which resulted in the latter being "black-balled" from a number of zoos.

George also featured on the BBC Home Service's Desert Island Discs in January 1957. His music choices included Mozart, Bach, Beethoven and Handel. His luxury item was a pair of field glasses.
