= Come Dancing =

British BBC TV ballroom dancing series (1950–1998)

- Genre: Ballroom dancing talent show
- Created by: Eric Morley
- Presented by: Guest presenters; Peter West; Terry Wogan; Peter Marshall; David Jacobs; Angela Rippon; Frank Bough; Rosemarie Ford
- Narrated by: Barri Haynes; Ray Moore; Bruce Hammal; Charles Nove
- Country of origin: United Kingdom
- Original language: English
- No. of episodes: 424

Production
- Production location: Mecca ballrooms (original filming locations)
- Production company: British Broadcasting Corporation

Original release
- Network: BBC One
- Release: 29 September 1950 – 29 December 1998

Related
- Television Dancing Club (1948–1964); Strictly Come Dancing (2004–present)

Come Dancing is a British ballroom dancing competition show made by the British Broadcasting Corporation (BBC), which aired on BBC One at various intervals from 1950 to 1998. Unlike its subsequent follow-up show, Strictly Come Dancing, contestants were neither celebrities nor professionals.

The show was created by Eric Morley, the founder of Miss World, in 1949, and began by broadcasting from regional ballroom studios owned by Mecca, with professional dancers Syd Perkin and Edna Duffield on hand to offer teaching. Its original format was based on a knock-out process of teams from various regions around the UK, such as East Anglia or the South West. In 1953, the format changed to become a competition, with dancers representing the home nations (England, Northern Ireland, Scotland, and Wales), with later series seeing regions of the United Kingdom going head to head for its coveted trophy.

== Broadcast ==
In 1950, Come Dancing joined Television Dancing Club, and the two programmes ran on alternate weeks until 1964, when the latter finished. At its peak, in the late 1960s and 1970s, it attracted audiences of ten million. The last regular series was aired in 1995 (with no series in 1982 or 1987); this was followed by International Come Dancing specials in 1996 and 1998. The final edition, a 50th anniversary special, was presented by Rosemarie Ford and broadcast on BBC One from the Royal Albert Hall in London on 29 December 1998.

In 2023, BBC Four began repeating editions of the show from the 1970s. The entire 1979 run was repeated by BBC Four in January and February alongside an episode from 1977 and the Grand Final from 1974. On 12 October 2024, the channel repeated the 1990 Grand Final, as part of an 80th birthday celebration night for former Come Dancing presenter Angela Rippon, which also features future Strictly head judge Len Goodman as part of the judging panel. On 1 February 2026, BBC4 aired the 1978 Grand Final as part of an evening remembering its presenter, Terry Wogan, around the tenth anniversary of his death.

== Presenters ==
The first presenter in 1950 was Peter Dimmock, and was assisted by Leslie Mitchell as its master of ceremonies. Many subsequent presenters over the years included Sylvia Peters, Peter West (1957 to 1972), McDonald Hobley, Charles Nove, Terry Wogan, Brian Johnston, Peter Marshall, Angela Rippon, Frank Bough, Michael Aspel, David Jacobs, Judith Chalmers, Pete Murray and Rosemarie Ford. Commentators included Ray Moore, Bruce Hammal, and Charles Nove.

== Revival ==
Inspired by the resurgence in ballroom dancing in the UK following the 1992 Australian film Strictly Ballroom, a relaunched celebrity version entitled Strictly Come Dancing (affectionately known simply as Strictly) debuted on BBC One in 2004, and became a major success with Saturday evening audiences. Strictly paired a professional dancer together with a celebrity partner, and was originally hosted by Bruce Forsyth and Tess Daly, assisted by Claudia Winkleman. In later years, Winkleman was promoted to full-time co-host in 2014 after Forsyth's departure. The title is an amalgamation of the titles of Come Dancing and the film Strictly Ballroom. The format of the newer show has become an international success, having been successfully exported to many other countries as Dancing with the Stars or similar names in local languages.
