= Mary Malcolm =

British journalist (1918–2010)

- Born: Helen Mary Malcolm; 15 March 1918; Marylebone, London, England
- Died: 13 October 2010 (aged 92); Bottisham, Cambridgeshire, England
- Occupations: Radio and TV presenter and producer
- Years active: 1948–1956 (BBC career)
- Employer: BBC Television
- Spouse(s): Basil Bartlett (1937–1960); Colin McFadyean (1960–2006)
- Children: 3
- Parent(s): Sir Ian Malcolm; Jeanne Langtry

Helen Mary Malcolm (15 March 1918 – 13 October 2010) was one of the first two regular female announcers on BBC Television after the Second World War and was a household name in the United Kingdom during the 1950s.

== Biography ==
The only daughter and youngest of four children of the diplomat and politician Sir Ian Malcolm and Jeanne Langtry (1881–1964) and granddaughter of the Victorian socialite and actress Lillie Langtry, a mistress of King Edward VII, Mary Malcolm was born in Marylebone and brought up partly in Poltalloch, Argyll, Scotland. Until the age of sixteen, she attended the Lycée Français de Londres in South Kensington, London. She began her television career in 1948, having gained broadcasting experience on the radio during the Second World War.

As more and more men were called up to fight, women became increasingly in demand to fill posts at the BBC. Mary Malcolm was taken on and worked for the Home Service as a continuity announcer from March 1942. With the relaunch of the BBC's television service after the war, she worked alongside Sylvia Peters and McDonald Hobley, with the trio averaging ten days' work a month each.

At this time, all television programmes were introduced by an in-vision host or hostess and broadcasts were normally live. Malcolm received no training and became known for her spoonerisms: "By the end of the day I was tired, and when I came to the weather forecast I just read it out without really trying. My biggest fear was 'drain and rizzle', which I said more than once." With the advent of commercial rival ITV in 1955, the BBC's reliance on announcers diminished. Commercial breaks quickly became popular and the BBC decided audiences no longer needed a hostess to soothe them. Malcolm left the BBC in 1956 although she continued to appear as a guest on various programmes including an episode of the comedy series The Goodies. Her autobiography, Me, was published in 1956.

== Personal life ==
Malcolm was first married to Sir Basil Bartlett, a baronet and actor, on 5 January 1937. They had three daughters, Lucy, Jemima, and Annabel, before the marriage ended in divorce in 1960. She married secondly Colin McFadyean, a solicitor, on 16 June 1960, gaining two step-daughters: Andrea, who died in 1983, and Melanie McFadyean, who became a journalist. Malcolm had the onset of dementia late on in her life and died on 13 October 2010 at the Hilton Park care centre in Bottisham, Cambridgeshire.

== Selected filmography ==
- Design for Loving (1962)
