= Sylvia Peters =

English actress and BBC presenter (1925–2016)

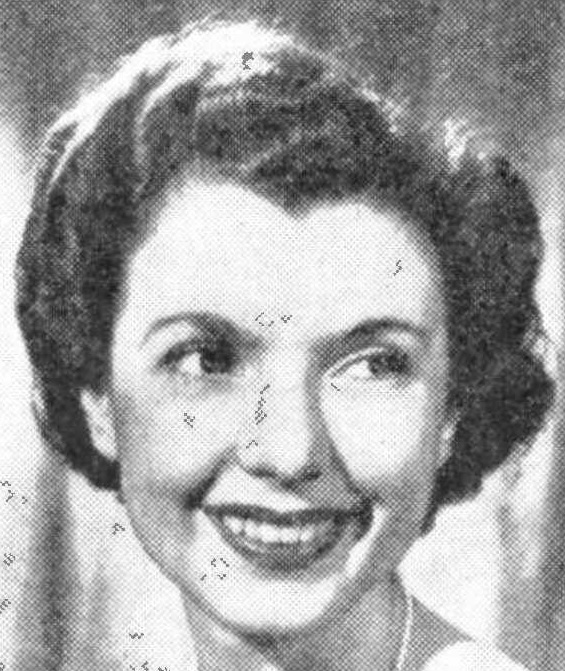
- Peters in 1952
- Born: Sylvia Lucia Petronzio; 26 September 1925; Highgate, London, England
- Died: 26 July 2016 (aged 90); Wimbledon, London, England
- Occupation: Television broadcaster
- Known for: Continuity announcer for the Coronation of Queen Elizabeth II
- Spouse: Kenneth Milne-Buckley (m. 1950; died 1982)
- Children: 1
- Parent(s): Romolo Petronzio; Ethel Edwards

Sylvia Lucia Petronzio (26 September 1925 – 26 July 2016), better known as Sylvia Peters, was an English actress, and from 1947 to 1958 a continuity announcer and presenter for BBC Television. She introduced the Coronation of Queen Elizabeth II in 1953, and later advised the Queen as she prepared for her first televised Christmas Message in 1957.

== Early life ==
Peters was born in Highgate, north London, to Romolo Petronzio, an Italian ebony goods manufacturer who owned a clock-making business, and Ethel Edwards, an English ballet lover. The family later moved to Finchley, north London. She began dancing lessons at the age of three, and later performed in musicals at the Coliseum Theatre in London.

== BBC career ==
On reading a newspaper advertisement in June 1947 for a continuity announcer for BBC Television, Peters's mother encouraged her to apply because she did not like Peters being on the stage. Peters completed the audition tasks, which included testing in foreign languages and pronunciation, and screen tests in reading and interviewing, and was chosen from hundreds of applicants. She became one of a team of three continuity announcers with Mary Malcolm and McDonald Hobley. Peters first appeared on screen the same month, June 1947. Television broadcasts then only occurred in the evening, and the announcers had to broadcast live, without an autocue and without rehearsals.

On 2 June 1953, Peters was chosen to introduce the live television broadcast of the coronation of Queen Elizabeth II, an event which she considered the highlight of her career. She later stated that she thought she was chosen because she was the same age as the Queen (28) and because she had an excellent memory – the script was provided to her only the night before the event. On the day, Peters provided linking material from 10 a.m. to 11.30 p.m. to an estimated audience of 20 million viewers in Britain and 227 million globally. She later became involved in teaching the Queen the broadcasting skills necessary for her Royal Christmas Message broadcasts, by recording a training film for the monarch. The film demonstrated various techniques such as reading a script and using an autocue, the latter of which the Queen chose for her broadcasts.

Peters was chosen in 1954 to host Come Dancing (the predecessor of Strictly Come Dancing), In 1956, she presented the children's programme For Deaf Children, and she was a compere for Television Dancing Club, which featured the bandleader Victor Silvester.

In December 1957, the BBC replaced the evening women announcers with the team of Kenneth Kendall, Richard Baker and Robert Dougall. Peters left the broadcaster the following year. She became a freelance broadcaster, and covered such events as Ladies' Day at Royal Ascot and Come Dancing, and made less frequent appearances on screen. She fronted Jim's Inn, an advertisement magazine for ITV.

== Later life and career ==
Peters opened a children's clothing shop in Wimbledon, London, in 1963, and a women's clothes shop in 1977. She returned to television work on a number of occasions, such as the Sykes 1977 Christmas special, and for special shows such as the BBC Television Service's 50th and 75th birthday specials. In the early 1980s she appeared on the magazine programme Afternoon Plus for Thames Television where she appeared with her former colleagues McDonald Hobley and Mary Malcolm. Later in the same decade she joined Robert (Bob) Dougall, Brian Johnston and other hosts in presenting the Channel 4 magazine programme for the over sixties, Years Ahead.

In 2013 she introduced the digitally restored film recording of the Queen's Coronation when it was repeated on BBC Parliament.

== Personal life ==
On 28 August 1950, she married Kenneth Milne-Buckley, who had been her first studio director at the BBC, gaining two stepchildren. They had one daughter, Carmella. Peters died of esophageal cancer at Kew House nursing home, Wimbledon on 26 July 2016, aged 90.
