= Simmons (electronic drum company) =

Electronic drum brand in Britain

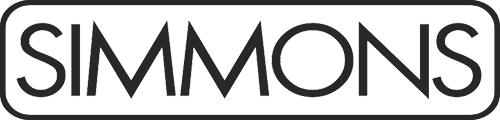
Logo

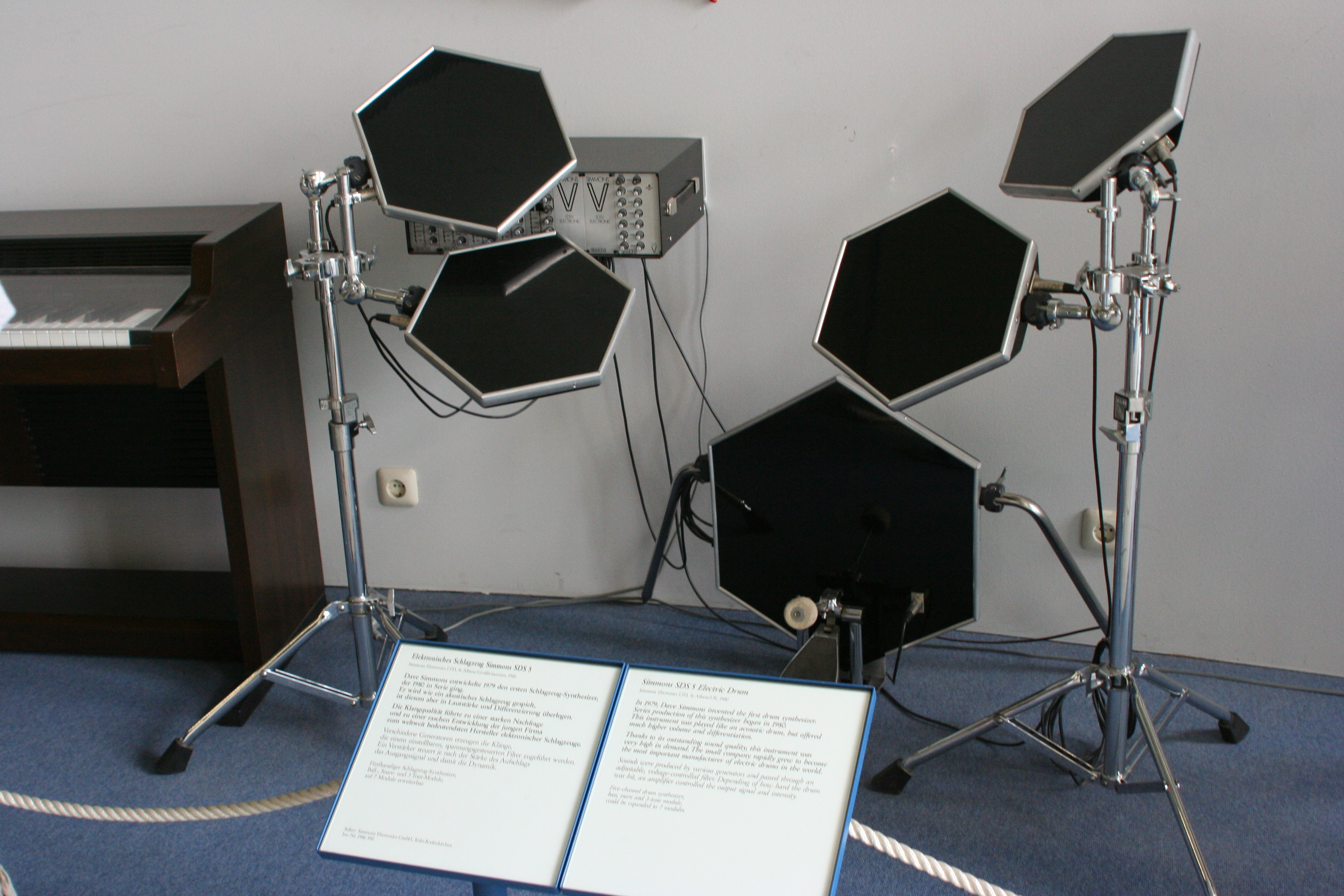
The Simmons SDSV Electronic Drum Kit, c. 1981

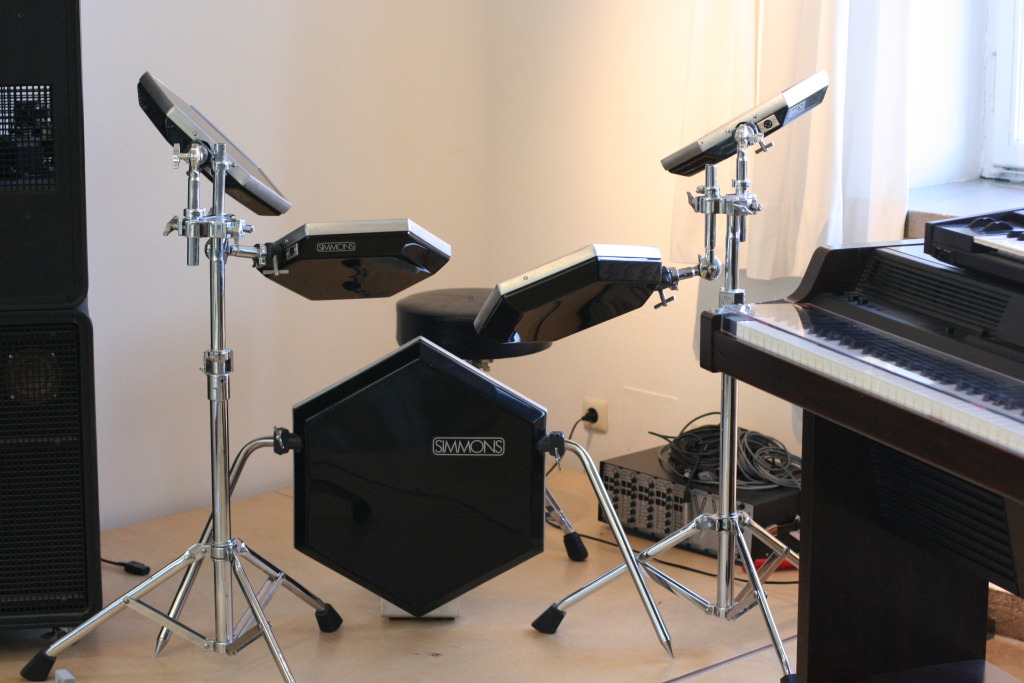
Simmons SDSV front view

Simmons is an electronic drum brand, which originally was a pioneering British manufacturer of electronic drums. Founded in 1978 by Dave Simmons, it supplied electronic kits from 1980 to 1998. The drums' distinctive, electronic sound can be found on countless albums from the 1980s. The company closed in 1999 before being relaunched under Guitar Center ownership in 2006 by at first rebranding generic Chinese kits for the North American market before Dave Simmons would return to the company in 2017; after which all kit design was brought fully back in house under his design leadership.

The Simmons SDSV was developed in conjunction with Richard James Burgess of Landscape and released in 1981. The first recordings of the instrument were made by Burgess, on From the Tea-rooms of Mars ...., "Chant No. 1" by Spandau Ballet, and "Angel Face" by Shock. After Landscape and Spandau Ballet appeared on Top of the Pops with the instrument, many other musicians began to use the new technology, including A Flock of Seagulls, Howard Jones, Jez Strode of Kajagoogoo, Roger Taylor of Duran Duran, Darren Costin of Wang Chung, Steve Negus of Saga, Bobby Z., Rick Allen of Def Leppard, Thomas Dolby, Prince, Phil Collins, Neil Peart of Rush, Bill Bruford, Talk Talk, Tangerine Dream, Cameo, Jonzun Crew, Depeche Mode, Jean-Michel Jarre, Donna Summer, Yukihiro Takahashi of Yellow Magic Orchestra (YMO) and Vangelis.

== History ==
Single-pad analog drum synthesizers, including the Pollard Syndrum and the Synare, were introduced in the 1970s, but their unrealistic sound made them generally more suitable for use as a percussion effect than as a replacement for traditional drums. They became a popular element in disco records, especially after the release of music from Star Wars, and can be heard on songs by The Jacksons and Rose Royce.

Around 1978 while working for the company Musicaid in St Albans, Dave Simmons developed a device with similar capabilities to the Syndrum and Synare, which he called the SDS3. The SDS3 featured four drum channels and a noise generator; the SDS IV (SDS4) was a functionally similar two-channel version. At this juncture, the drum pads were round, with wooden frames and real 8-inch drum heads. Musicaid was also the distributor for the Lyricon wind synthesizer as played by John L. Walters of Landscape. Walters introduced Richard James Burgess to Simmons and Burgess began using the SDS3s and SDS4s live, on stage, with Landscape. Recognizing the potential for a fully electronic drum set that could replace the traditional acoustic set rather than supplement it, Burgess began collaborating with Simmons. They mocked up the sounds and flowchart using an ARP 2600 synthesizer. Since Burgess was using the instrument in a live setting, they developed the four customizable preset buttons. The distinctive hexagonal shape came about after triangles and bat-wing mock-ups had been tried. Burgess finally decided that a honeycomb shape would fit together ergonomically and be simple yet distinctive in appearance. A limited edition of what Simmons referred to as the Mount Rushmore Head sets were also built. Burgess has two of these sets. The basic descending tom-tom sound was modeled after the way Burgess tuned his Pearl single-headed concert tom kit on which he would loosen one tension rod, causing a wrinkle in the head and creating a descending pitch after the tom was hit.

Burgess had recorded extensively with the prototype of the SDSV on the Landscape album, with Shock and Spandau Ballet before the SDSV, was introduced commercially in 1981. The world's first fully electronic drum set, the SDSV featured the famous hexagonal pads and distinctive sounds heard in countless songs by 1980s bands, including Duran Duran and Spandau Ballet. The standard configuration consisted of an expandable rack-mountable "brain", containing the various drum sounds, and pad modules for bass drum, snare, and three toms. Two spare slots are available so that cymbal or extra tom modules can be added; drummers may choose to use acoustic cymbals rather than the Simmons sounds, which have been compared to that of a trash can lid. Connections to the unit were by XLR plugs, and it can be interfaced with a drum sequencer. In Germany and the rest of Europe, Simmons had also a great success. Sibi Siebert counterpart of Baz Watts, both clinicians for Simmons, was travelling from Stockholm to Barcelona to show and play the kits. He played more than 700 workshops and had great success with his band Twelve Drummers Drumming (Phonogram), where the SDSV was featured live and on lot of TV shows (e.g. Rockpalast)

The SDSV's biggest disadvantage was the use of solid polycarbonate heads on the pads. Simmons chose this material for its durability, but the heads' lack of "give" often resulted in wrist discomfort. Soon after, Simmons began shipping pads with softer rubber surfaces. The SDSV became an instant hit, with Simmons endorsing several drummers, and the distinctive pad shape becoming an icon of the 1980s.

With the agreement of Simmons, Group Centre Inc. became the sole distributors of all Simmons Electronics products in the US. After visiting and demoing the SDSV to music stores in New York, Washington, Los Angeles and Chicago, he secured orders from them all. Manufacturing was ramped up quickly in time for the NAMM Music Expo in Chicago and after staging a series of demos featuring Bill Bruford, dozens more music store owners from all over the country signed up to this electronic revolution, and that expansion quickly established the Simmons name in the rest of the US.

== More models ==
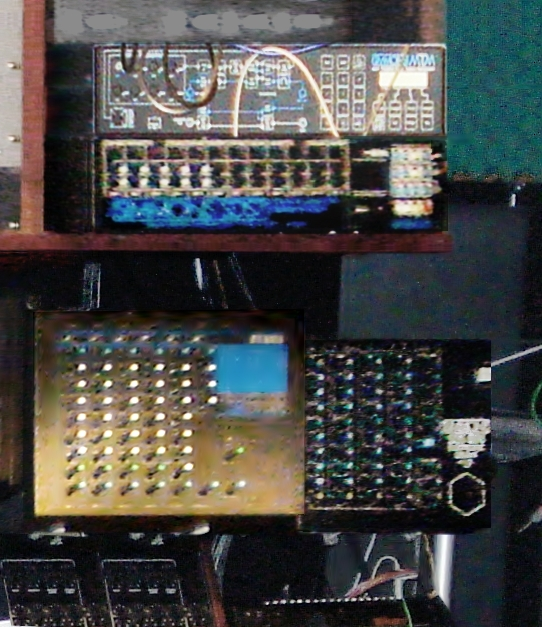
Simmons models: MTM: 8 ch MIDI-Trigger Converter; SDS7: Modular sample player with analog filters; (Tama Techstar TS305); SDS 800: 4 ch analog drum synthesizer : (bottom right)

During the lifetime of the SDSV, Simmons also produced a compact trigger unit about the size of a suitcase, containing seven small pads. Used in conjunction with the SDSV brain, this allowed players to add Simmons sounds to an existing acoustic kit without incorporating a set of full-size pads. This unit was used extensively by New Order at the time.

Also available at the same time was the SDS6 drum sequencer, used to great effect by artists such as Howard Jones.

Following the success of the SDSV, Simmons expanded their range in 1984, with another modular rack-based brain called the SDS7, which features digital sampling sounds on EPROM for the first time, expandable up to twelve modules, and redesigned pads, featuring a skin of rubber to make playing a little easier. The unit uses 8-bit samples and a programmable memory, but is prone to malfunctioning and loss of memory, making it unpopular in a live context.

The same year, they also produced the cheaper analog-only SDS8, which featured a single, non-expandable desktop-style brain with one unalterable factory preset and one custom user preset for each channel. The SDS8 kit was supplied with four tom pads and a bass pad, using similar hardware to the earlier SDSV, but in a more budget style, such as using jack leads instead of XLR connectors. The sounds were similar to the SDSV, but, to the discerning ear, not up to the same quality. However, the kit has remained a popular alternative to the SDSV for those seeking analogue Simmons sounds.

Also available at the time were a number of smaller devices, such as an SDS-EPB E-PROM Blower to write samples onto the chips, a Digital ClapTrap unit, which is a digital clap sound device, a sound very popular in 1980s music.

Simmons began to expand their product line with smaller kits and pads, including the SDS1, which was a single pad with a built-in EPROM reader for playing a single drum sound sample, and the all-analog SDS 200 (2 tom system), SDS 400 (4 tom system), and SDS 800 (bass, snare, and 2 tom system). These products were aimed at acoustic drummers who wanted to add a couple of Simmons pads to their kit on a budget. Some of these products also feature the run generator, which allows drummers to play a descending drum roll with a single pad hit.

In 1985, Simmons introduced the SDS9, a hybrid digital/analog brain with three changeable EEPROM channels (kick, snare, and rim) and analog-synthesized toms. It also featured 40 presets (20 factory and 20 user-programmable) and a built-in digital delay. This kit was yet another well received product for Simmons as it combines realistic sounds in an inexpensive, compact brain. Following customer feedback, Simmons also produced a new series of drum pads using "floating" drum heads and changeable shells. The snare drum had an extra trigger for the rim. Again, this improved the playability of the kit.

Another brain was introduced in 1986 called the SDS 1000, and was, in effect, the same sounds as the SDS9 (without the ability to change the EPROMS) in a slim 1U, MIDI-enabled, rack mountable unit. The snare sounds, however, are more realistic and clear than the SDS9. The SDS 1000 also includes a "second skin" feature, which simulates the sound of dual-headed drums.

== The SDX ==
In 1987, after the SDS9, Simmons decided to enter into the high-end professional market and created the revolutionary SDX. It introduced new features that were unheard of in other electronic drums such as "zone intelligence" and "pad layering". Some of these ideas were not revisited by other companies until nearly 15 years after the SDX.

Zone Intelligence allows for up to three samples to be assigned to different positional locations on a pad for a more realistic sound. With pad layering, up to nine different samples can be triggered via different strike velocities and positions, selecting samples from a 3 by 3 matrix. The samples can also be further manipulated by applying positive or negative values on a matrix (routed to both position and dynamic), simultaneously affecting the following aspects of the sound: volume, pitch, brightness, panning, noise element, and sample start point. All or any of these aspects of the sound, are both programmable and continuously variable dependent upon strike position and strike velocity and were user programmable in the extreme. The SDX is the first Simmons kit since the SDS7 to support cymbal sounds, using pads called "Symbals" which simulate the swaying motion of real cymbals with a swivel rod. The SDX include a built-in sampler with a floppy disk drive, internal SCSI hard disk drive and optional external SCSI ZIP or Syquest drives as the methods of data storage. The SDX introduced a new way of modifying sounds. Rather than knobs and switches, it features a 9" monochrome CRT screen with a GUI controlled by a trackball, similar to the early Mac OS. SDX OS allows users to fully modify sounds with an easy-to-use interface. It also features a full 64-track real-time sequencer with the ability to nondestructively quantize recordings and sync them to MIDI.

Sales of the SDX were limited due to its high price, costing around $10,154. The factory sounds included with the SDX did not match the quality expected for a system of such advanced technology, so many drummers chose to sample their own sounds. In 1988, the SDX software was updated to make SDX suitable for use with MIDI keyboards, thus offering a sound source rivaling the Fairlight CMI for a fraction of the price. Approximately 250 SDX Consoles were sold.

Primary users of SDX included Bill Bruford (with ABWH and King Crimson), Joe Hammer (Jean Michel Jarre's drummer) and also Danny Carey with Tool. The SDX also featured on Pip Greasley's The 5k Pursuit Opera C4TV [1991] where it was played by Bruce Mason.

== Decline ==
By the time of the launch of the SDX, the company had seen a dramatic fall in their sales as drummers abandoned electronics to return to their acoustic kits. Additionally, due to expensive R&D and manufacturing costs of the SDX, Simmons was losing money. Their final kit was released in 1989, called the SDS 2000, featuring sounds from the SDX library, digital effects, further refined pads, and a new company logo. Along with the SDS 2000, Simmons manufactured pads with real drumheads called Hexaheads, along with Minihexes, smaller-sized pads sometimes used as cymbal pads. This system saw a commercial decline in the face of competition from companies such as Roland and Yamaha, and the evolution of musical styles from the 1980s into the 1990s. During the 1990s, Simmons shifted their focus from drum synthesis to drum triggering and MIDI control, with products like the ADT (acoustic drum trigger) and Trixer (triggered electric drums (digital samples) from acoustic drum mics), Drum Huggers (small clip-on acoustic drum triggers/pads), and the Silicon Mallet (a xylophone-style MIDI controller). One of Simmons's last products, the Turtle Trap, is a MIDI controller made from the shell of a bass drum pad, with the pads being the surfaces of Minihexes. However, all of these products sold poorly compared to the company's peak period. In 1999, the company closed.

== Relaunch ==
In 2005, Guitar Center acquired the rights to the Simmons trademark and began marketing affordable Chinese-manufactured electronic drums (commercialized under other names in the world) under the Simmons name and original logo. While these kits have no relationship to the original company, some of their designs feature traces of the familiar hexagon shape, similar model numbers, and built-in samples of the classic Simmons sounds.

In 2017, Simmons announced the new SD2000 series with a planned retail release on August 4, 2017, while simultaneously making public the return of Dave Simmons to the company. The SD2000 was a top-to-bottom redesign (with the exception of the included HEXX rack), and was available in five-piece: 11″ triple-zone SimHex snare, three 9″ dual-zone SimHex toms, 9″ mesh bass drum with nonslip stand, 13″ dual-zone chokeable crash, 15″ triple-zone ride and 12″ hi-hat. A seven-piece kit added one 9″ dual-zone SimHex tom and one 13″ dual-zone chokeable crash to the 5-piece configuration. The additional tom and cymbal units could also be purchased separately as an add-on, but there was no additional room to add components beyond upgrading the 5-piece. When upgraded, the 5-piece was identical to the 7-piece. Photos of the control unit indicated that it occupied all the available inputs. The newly designed kit employed mesh heads - the first in the Simmons line to do so - which were tensioned with a standard drum key. The pre-programmed sound bank included classic acoustic kit samples, sounds pulled from vintage Simmons kits such as the SDSV, as well as world percussion and effect sounds (e.g. handclaps, cowbell, etc.). Additionally users could add their own samples to the library.

The control module included a full-color LCD, a built-in mixer, and a USB port that allowed playback of WAV and MP3 files from a USB drive, as well as recording in WAV format back out to a thumb drive. Other features were midi over USB, and USB out to a computer (either for kit-to-machine recording or machine-to-kit programming).

As a visual reminder of the classic Dave Simmons-designed systems offered in the 1980s, although the SD2000 had round, tensionable, mesh heads, they were mounted in hexagonal frames reminiscent of the SDSV pattern.

== Notable users ==
- David Kendrick of Devo (1988-1991)
- Polo Corbella, Pato Loza and Miguel Abuelo of Los Abuelos de la Nada
- Miguel Tapia of Los Prisioneros
- Mario Serra of Virus
- Jon Farriss of INXS
- Jo Hammer of Jean Michel Jarre
- Danny Seraphine of Chicago
- Dave Weckl of Chick Corea Elektric Band
- Vinnie Colaiuta
- Peter Erskine
- Frank Ricotti
- Chad Wackerman of Frank Zappa in 1984
- Mel Pritchard of Barclay James Harvest
- Steve Coy of Dead or Alive
- Jürgen "CC" Behrens of the German Synth-Pop band Silent Circle
- Alan White of Yes
- Richard James Burgess of Landscape
- Rusty Egan with Visage, Skids, Phil Lynott and Rich Kids
- John Keeble of Spandau Ballet
- Alex Van Halen of Van Halen
- Neil Peart of Rush from 1983 to 1989
- Nick Mason of Pink Floyd
- Producer Gus Dudgeon played the SDSV on two of Elton John's albums, 1985's Ice on Fire, and 1986's Leather Jackets
- Manuel De Peppe of Bee Hive and Bee Hive Reunion
- Gary Wallis with Pink Floyd had a massive rig of Simmons drums
- Jeff Phillips with Howard Jones and Chris de Burgh
- Peter van Hooke of Mike + The Mechanics
- Donny Baldwin of Starship
- Terry Williams of Dire Straits
- Bobby Rivkin with Prince
- Danny Carey with Tool
- Jon King of Gang of Four
- Bryn Burrows of Freur
- Herwig Mitteregger of Spliff
- Ali Score of A Flock of Seagulls
- Danny Simcic of Real Life
- Darren Costin of Wang Chung
- Don Henley
- Larry Troutman of Zapp
- Mark Fordyce of The Mood
- Lee Harris of Talk Talk
- Stuart Elliott of The Alan Parsons Project
- Steve Negus of Saga
- Alan Wilder of Depeche Mode
- Bill Bruford of Yes, King Crimson, and Anderson Bruford Wakeman Howe
- Mike Lee of SKYY band and Grover Washington, Jr.
- John Fell of Alonso Brito and Heroine Sheiks
- Chris Vrenna and Josh Freese with Nine Inch Nails
- Roger Taylor of Queen
- Roger Taylor of Duran Duran
- Phil Collins of Genesis - Notably uses SDSV on "Second Home by the Sea" on Genesis' 1983 eponymous album, and SDS7 on their 1986 album Invisible Touch; also during his solo career, SDS7 notably on "Who Said I Would" from his 1985 album No Jacket Required
- Chester Thompson with Phil Collins and Genesis
- Peter Hook of New Order played a Simmons Briefcase which can be seen on the video for "The Perfect Kiss"
- Warren Cann of Ultravox
- Jon Moss of Culture Club
- Jerzy Piotrowski of Kombi
- Chris Kavanagh and Ray Mayhew of Sigue Sigue Sputnik
- David Robinson of The Cars
- Mercury Caronia of Industry
- Yukihiro Takahashi of Yellow Magic Orchestra and Sadistic Mika Band
- Jet Black of The Stranglers
- Akira Jimbo of Casiopea
- Ryu Kouji(ja:笠浩二) of C-C-B
- Eric Carr of Kiss used electronic toms on all of his drum kits from 1985 until his death in 1991.
- After drummer Dennis Wilson's death in 1983, The Beach Boys added a Simmons drum kit to their tours and began using electronic drums in the studio and on the road. They used one acoustic drum kit and one Simmons kit (which replaced their previous percussion setup), and touring drummers Mike Kowalski and Bobby Figueroa rotated between these kits for most of the 1980s.
- Micky Dolenz of The Monkees occasionally played a Simmons electronic kit during the band's mid-to-late 1980s reunion tours.
- Simmons made a special kit SDS9 for Def Leppard drummer Rick Allen following Allen's loss of his left arm in a car accident. Allen and Simmons spent over a year developing a kit that used foot pedals to compensate for his missing arm.
- James Murphy of LCD Soundsystem used a Simmons SDSV on several of his albums.
- Baz Watts of John Foxx and Adam Ant and Q-Tips
- Jez Strode of Kajagoogoo
- Andy Anderson of The Cure
- Steve White of The Style Council (Steve used SDSV them with The Style Council between 1983 and 1984)
- Graham Broad played the distinctive Simmons fill that is part of the EastEnders theme song.
- Michael Cavanagh of King Gizzard & the Lizard Wizard on the 2023 LP The Silver Cord as well as live performances.

== See also ==
- Pollard Syndrum
- Electronic drum
