= Roland MC-8 Microcomposer =

Music sequencer

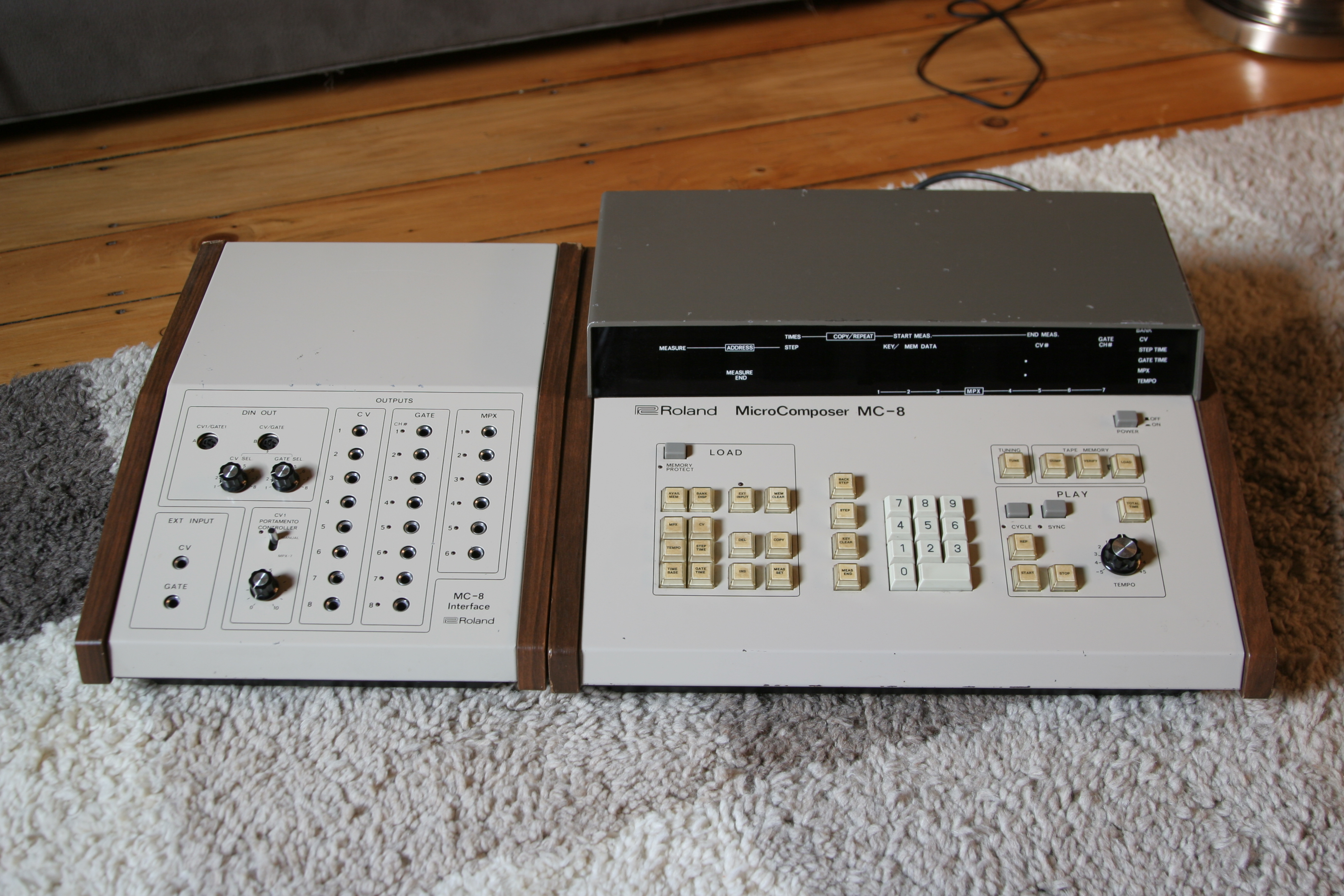
Roland MC-8 MicroComposer

The Roland MC-8 MicroComposer by the Roland Corporation was introduced in early 1977 at a list price of US$4,795 (¥1,200,000 JPY). It was one of the earliest stand-alone microprocessor-driven CV/Gate music sequencers, following EMS Sequencer 256 in 1971 and New England Digital's ABLE computer (microprocessor) in 1975. Roland called the MC-8 a "computer music composer" and it was considered revolutionary at the time, introducing features such as a keypad to enter note information and 16 kilobytes of random access memory which allowed a maximum sequence length of 5200 notes, a huge step forward from the 8-16 step sequencers at the time. It also allowed the user to allocate multiple pitch CVs to a single Gate channel, creating polyphonic parts within the overall sequence. Due to the high price, only 200 units were sold worldwide, but it represented a huge leap forward in music technology.

== Overview ==
The MicroComposer could precisely adjust multiple sound producing and effects elements of a synthesizer, such as the VCO, VCF, and other voltage-controlled components very rapidly, which is nearly impossible to do manually by a performer. The MC-8 was designed to work with large complex modular synthesizers such as the System 700 and System-100M. It could also be used during a live performance to control lighting by using pre-programmed, timed pulses, and pre-programmed timed voltage levels.

The MC-8 was based on a prototype developed by Canadian Ralph Dyck, a composer and technologist who did research and development for Roland. Roland switched to the then brand new Intel 8080A 8-bit microprocessor and increased the RAM from 512 bytes to 16KB, allowing storage of over 5,300 notes, which could be entered via the calculator keyboard (the preferred method) or recorded in real-time (not so easy). Backup was via cassette and could take 45 minutes to an hour for a three- or four-minute piece of music to back up and verify. The memory was volatile, so a loss of power meant complete loss of data. All parameters were variable so the scale and time-base could be assigned number values to suit the needs of the piece being programmed. This made the machine extremely versatile but somewhat unfriendly to approach for the first time.

While only 200 units were sold worldwide, the MC-8 was a revolutionary product. It provided storage for variables in analogue sound production, synchronization capability for multi-channel recording (the time-code could be recorded on a spare track), sufficient capacity for recording full compositions, editing capabilities and rapid access time. The MC-8 provided eight control voltage outputs and eight gate outputs, as well as a six-bit multiplex output with a special seventh bit set aside for portamento control.

== Popular music ==
The earliest known band to utilize the MC-8 was the Japanese electronic music group Yellow Magic Orchestra in 1978, for their self-titled album and for member Ryuichi Sakamoto's solo album Thousand Knives, with Hideki Matsutake as the programmer in both albums. At the time, Billboard noted that the use of such computer-based technology in conjunction with synthesizers allowed Yellow Magic Orchestra to create new sounds that were not possible until then. The band later described the MC-8, along with member Hideki Matsutake who programmed it, as an "inevitable factor" in both their music production and live performances.

The German electronic music group Tangerine Dream also used the MC-8 on their album Force Majeure, recorded August to September 1978 at Hansa no.3 studio in Berlin. The band at one point owned 3 MC-8s.

Richard James Burgess and John L. Walters from the band Landscape were also among the first major commercial users of the MC-8. They began experimenting with computer-programmed music and Burgess's co-designed SDS5 electronic drums in the late 1970s making records in the emerging New Romantic, electronic dance music and synthpop genres. They triggered various synths such as the Roland System 100 and Moogs which also used CV/Gate. Burgess created the drum parts by using the multiplex outputs of the MC8 to trigger the prototype, breadboard version of the SDS5 drum synthesizer. Most of the album From the Tea-rooms of Mars (1981) was made this way and Burgess produced many other tracks this way including the European club hit "Angel Face" (1980) for the group Shock. Burgess and Walters demonstrated the MC-8 on BBC TV's Tomorrow's World.

== Notable users ==
- Kraftwerk on The Man-Machine
- Suzanne Ciani
- Landscape on From the Tea-rooms of Mars ....
- Giorgio Moroder on From Here to Eternity
- Martin Rushent
- Tangerine Dream
- Isao Tomita
- Toto
- Yellow Magic Orchestra
- Hans Zimmer
- The Human League on Dare
- Chris Carter
