= Landscape (Landscape album) =

Studio album by Landscape
- Released: 1979
- Recorded: Mid 1979
- Studio: Utopia Studios, Primrose Hill; The Manor; Audio International Studios, London W1
- Genre: Jazz rock
- Length: 35:43
- Label: RCA
- Producer: Greg Walsh

Landscape chronology
Landscape (1979)	From the Tea-rooms of Mars .... (1981)

Singles from Landscape
- 1. "Japan" Released: 1979; 2. "Sonja Henie" Released: 1979

Professional ratings
Review scores
Source	Rating
AllMusic	3/5 stars

Landscape is the debut studio album by the band Landscape, released in 1979. It contains ten instrumental tracks with a jazz-funk influence.

The album was reissued in 1992 on the Mau Mau Records label. This CD also includes Landscape's second album From the Tea-rooms of Mars ..... The album was reissued again in November 2009 on the Cherry Pop label. This CD also includes Landscape's final album, Manhattan Boogie-Woogie.

== Track listing ==
=== LP: RCA PL 25248 ===
Side one
No.	Title	Writer(s)	Length
1.	"Japan"	Richard James Burgess, John Walters, Christopher Heaton, Landscape	3:22
2.	"Lost in the Small Ads"	John Walters, Landscape	4:16
3.	"The Mechanical Bride"	John Walters, Landscape	3:24
4.	"Neddy Sindrum"	Burgess, Heaton, Landscape	3:42
5.	"Kaptin Whorlix"	Andy Pask, Landscape	3:50

Side two
No.	Title	Writer(s)	Length
1.	"Sonja Henie"	Heaton, John Walters, Burgess, Landscape	3:31
2.	"Many's the Time"	Peter Thoms, Landscape	3:23
3.	"Highly Suspicious"	Heaton, Burgess, Landscape	3:38
4.	"Gotham City"	Landscape	3:38
5.	"Wandsworth Plain"	John Walters, Landscape	2:59

== Personnel ==
Landscape

- Richard James Burgess - Pearl Drums, SDS 3 drums synthesizer, acoustic percussion, Moog drum
- Christopher Heaton - Yamaha CS80 polyphonic synthesizer, Fender Rhodes Piano, grand piano, Roland Chorus Echo
- Andy Pask – fretless and fretted Griffin basses
- Peter Thoms - trombone, electric trombone
- John Walters - soprano saxophone, Lyricon, flute

== Production ==
- Producer: Greg Walsh
- Engineer: Greg Walsh
- Additional engineering: Peter Walsh, Richard Manwaring
- Assistant engineers: Marlis Duncklau, Simon Hurrell
- Graphics: John Warwicker
- J.J. Jeczalik, Peter Lorimer - continuity supervision

== Audio excerpts ==
Landscape - Japan excerpt
An excerpt from Japan

Landscape - Sonja Henie excerpt
An excerpt from Sonja Henie
