= Manhattan Boogie-Woogie =

Studio album by Landscape
- Released: 1982
- Genre: Synthpop; Electronic dance
- Length: 33:52
- Label: RCA
- Producer: Landscape

Landscape chronology
From the Tea-rooms of Mars .... (1981)	Manhattan Boogie-Woogie (1982)

Singles from Manhattan Boogie-Woogie
- 1. "It's Not My Real Name" Released: 1982; 2. "Eastern Girls" Released: 1982

Professional ratings
Review scores
Source	Rating
AllMusic	2.5/5 stars

Manhattan Boogie-Woogie is the third and final album by Landscape and was released in 1982. It is the only Landscape album that does not include any instrumental tracks.

The album was reissued in November 2009 on the Cherry Pop label. This CD also includes Landscape's self-titled debut album Landscape.

== Track listing ==
=== LP: RCA LP 6037 ===
All tracks are written by Richard James Burgess, Christopher Heaton, Andy Pask, Peter Thoms and John Walters, except where noted.

Side one
No.	Title	Writer(s)	Length
1.	"One Rule for the Rich"		4:15
2.	"Manhattan Boogie-Woogie"	Burgess, Walters, Landscape	4:32
3.	"Colour Code (Tell Me Something New)"		3:48
4.	"The Long Way Home"		4:48

Side two
No.	Title	Writer(s)	Length
1.	"It's Not My Real Name"		5:21
2.	"Bad Times"		4:12
3.	"Eastern Girls"		3:16
4.	"When You Leave Your Lover"	Burgess, Heaton, Thoms, Landscape	3:40

== Personnel ==
Landscape

- Richard James Burgess - acoustic and electronic drums, vocals, computer programming
- Christopher Heaton - synthesizers, piano, Minimoog, vocals
- Andy Pask - bass guitar, fretless bass, vocals
- Peter Thoms - electric trombone, trombone, vocals
- John Walters - Lyricon, soprano saxophone, vocals, computer programming

== Production ==
- Producer: Landscape
- Engineers: Mike Gregovich, Andy Jackson, Neil Black, Pete Smith, Richard James Burgess
- Design: Ian Wright
- Art direction: Andrew Christian
- Original photography: Brian Aris

== Audio excerpts ==
Landscape - It's Not My Real Name excerpt
An excerpt from It's Not My Real Name

Landscape - Eastern Girls excerpt
An excerpt from Eastern Girls excerpt
