= Simmons SDSV =

Electronic drum kit

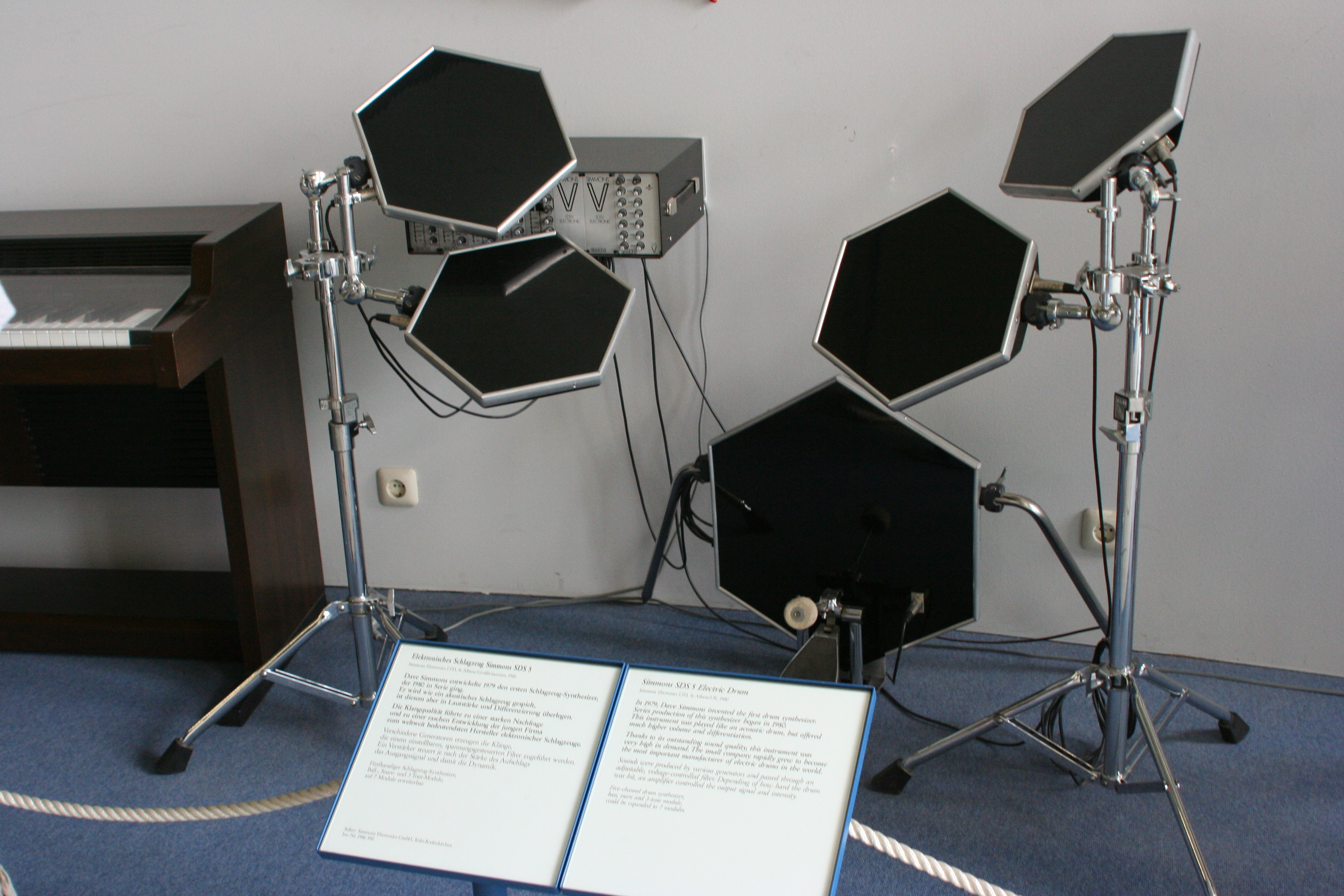
Simmons SDSV (SDS5)

The Simmons SDSV or SDS5 was the first viable electronic replacement for acoustic drums. It was developed by Richard James Burgess and Dave Simmons, manufactured initially by Musicaid in Hatfield, UK, and commercially released in the first half of 1981. After Musicaid went bankrupt, Simmons set up a new manufacturing company under his name, Simmons.

Burgess pioneered the use of the SDSV, triggering the prototype version with a Roland MC-8 Microcomposer in 1979 to make Landscape's groundbreaking computer-programmed futurist album From the Tea-Rooms of Mars... To the Hell-Holes of Uranus. Burgess's original concept had been to make a machine which could be played by a drummer as a replacement for acoustic drums. This idea was developed from dealing with the problems of audio spill via the microphones on a live stage and was fleshed out via an article he wrote for Sound International Magazine in 1979 called "Skin and Syn". He finally recorded the first example of the SDSV to be played by a drummer in 1981 when he produced the Spandau Ballet hit, "Chant No. 1 (I Don't Need This Pressure On)", featuring John Keeble on the now famous hexagonal pads and the first production SDSV 'brain', which immediately became popular with several 1980s musicians.

== Idea ==
Burgess had been triggering electronics from his acoustic drums both live and in the studio throughout the 1970s, but he really wanted a drum synthesiser that would stand alone and would allow adjustment of the individual parameters of the drum sound. For live applications he realised some sort of sound memory would be essential so they came up with the cost-effective idea of four (adjustable) presets for each module which were preloaded so, even without programming experience, something decent could be coaxed out of it.

== Pads ==
The pads were made from extremely hard plastic material that was used in police riot shields. They were robust, but many drummers complained of wrist and elbow ache. Subsequent versions of the SDS line introduced rubber pads that were kinder on drummers but many felt that the later revisions of the electronics lacked the character of the original SDSV.

The futuristic hexagonal pads were Burgess's idea based on the idea of interlocking shapes and inspired by a honeycomb. Many other prototype shapes were tested including batwings and triangles, and there were a very limited number of production kits made that were known as the Rushmore headkits that featured fiberglass faces as the body/shell of the 'drum'.

== Modules ==
The standard SDSV was loaded with five modules: Bass Drum, Snare and three Tom Toms, which looked almost identical, with controls for noise level, tone level, bend, decay time, noise tone (a simple filter) and click drum control which added extra attack derived from pad impact. Each module's parameters were optimised for the drum it was designed to emulate. Optional Cymbal and Hi-Hat modules were also available with open and closed hi-hats controlled from an external pedal. There was also a mixer section with individual volume control for each module (only into the mono/stereo output) and controls for pad sensitivity.

Outputs were balanced XLRs for live and studio applications (pins 1 & 2 ground, pin 3 hot), however the XLR pad input wiring on the SDSV was unconventional - the User Manual states that pin 2 is hot and pins 1 & 3 are ground. Each module also had a 1/4" jack trigger input allowing triggering from various sources including the SDS6 and even audio (for example from a drum machine).

== Notable users ==
- Rick Allen of Def Leppard
- Die Flippers
- Akira Jimbo of Casiopea
- Jet Black of the Stranglers
- Bill Bruford of Yes and King Crimson (one of the first and last users of Simmons, used them from 1981 to 1998)
- Richard James Burgess of Landscape
- Warren Cann of Ultravox
- Phil Collins of Genesis
- Stewart Copeland of the Police. Provides the sequenced drum backbeat in the main title theme of the American crime drama television series The Equalizer (1985–1989).
- Darren Costin of Wang Chung
- F. R. David on his 1982 album Words
- Thomas Dolby used an SDSV extensively during the production and touring of the 1982 album The Golden Age of Wireless.
- Producer Gus Dudgeon played the SDSV on two of Elton John's albums, 1985's Ice on Fire, and 1986's Leather Jackets
- Mark Fordyce of The Mood
- Lee Harris of Talk Talk
- Don Henley of the Eagles used them in the 1980s. The 1989 Bee Gees hit, "Ordinary Lives", features crashing drum sounds which were played by Henley on the SDSV.
- Malcolm Holmes of OMD
- Rob Hirst of Midnight Oil
- Steve Jansen of Japan
- Jean-Michel Jarre on his 1982 live album Concerts in China (recorded in 1981)
- Chris Kavanagh and Ray Mayhew of Sigue Sigue Sputnik
- John Keeble of Spandau Ballet
- Nick Mason with Pink Floyd
- Jon Moss of Culture Club
- James Murphy of LCD Soundsystem
- Steve Negus of Saga
- Roland Vaughn Kerridge of Re-Flex
- Gary Olds of Dino, Arsenio Hall, NKOB Tour 1989–1990. Las Vegas shows and Lounges. In concerts and studios Las Vegas and Los Angeles 1989–2015.
- Alan Parker used extensively on the British television crime drama Dempsey and Makepeace (1985–1986) soundtrack and main theme. The Simmons triplet drum rolls (with heavy reverb) were a characteristic motif of the main theme.
- Neil Peart of Rush from 1983 to 1989
- Jerzy Piotrowski of Polish band Kombi from the 1983 single "Linia Zycia" to the 1985 album Kombi 4.
- Roger Rizzitelli of Space Art
- David Robinson of The Cars
- Ali Score of A Flock of Seagulls
- Space featured a SDSV on their 2017 album Give Me Your Future.
- Dave Stewart (UK keyboard player, from 1981 to circa 1983)
- Roger Andrew Taylor of Duran Duran
- Roger Taylor of Queen
- Chester Thompson with Phil Collins and Genesis
- Franck Vaillant (independent drummer)
- Alex Van Halen of Van Halen
- Peter Van Hooke of Mike + The Mechanics
- Bobby Z with Prince
- Jürgen "CC" Behrens of the German Synth-Pop band Silent Circle
- Yukihiro Takahashi
- Danny Carey of Tool
