= Trapped (Colonel Abrams song) =

Single by Colonel Abrams

from the album Colonel Abrams
- Released: 1985
- Genre: House
- Length: 3:41
- Label: MCA
- Songwriters: Colonel Abrams; Marston Freeman
- Producer: Richard Burgess

Colonel Abrams singles chronology
"The Truth" (1985)	"Trapped" (1985)	"I'm Not Gonna Let" (1985)

"Trapped" is a song by American musician Colonel Abrams, released in 1985 as the first single from his first album, Colonel Abrams. The song topped the US Billboard Dance/Disco Club Play and 12-inch Singles Sales charts and peaked at number 20 on the Hot Black Singles chart. Worldwide, it reached number three on the UK Singles Chart and number six on the Dutch Top 40.

Produced by British record producer Richard Burgess in 1984, "Trapped" is widely considered the precursor to house music and is referred to as a proto-house track and a precursor to garage house.

== Legacy ==
Mike Stock of Stock Aitken Waterman stated that "Trapped" was a big influence on the 1987 Rick Astley smash hit "Never Gonna Give You Up".

== Track listings ==
- 12-inch single

Radio version (A-side)
No.	Title	Length
1.	"Trapped (vocal version)"	4:13
2.	"Trapped (dub version)"	4:06
3.	"Trapped (a cappella version)"	4:16

Dance version (B-side)
No.	Title	Length
1.	"Trapped (vocal version)"	6:30
2.	"Trapped (dub version)"	6:44

- 7-inch single

No.	Title	Length
1.	"Trapped (vocal version)"	4:13
2.	"Trapped (a cappella version)"	4:16

== Charts ==
=== Weekly charts ===
Chart (1985)	Peak position
Belgium (Ultratop 50 Flanders)	17
Europe (European Hot 100 Singles)	10
Netherlands (Dutch Top 40)	6
Netherlands (Single Top 100)	11
UK Singles (Official Charts)	3
US 12-inch Singles Sales (Billboard)	1
US Dance/Disco Club Play (Billboard)	1
US Hot Black Singles (Billboard)	20
West Germany (GfK)	13

=== Year-end charts ===
Chart (1985)	Position
Netherlands (Dutch Top 40)	74
Netherlands (Single Top 100)	76

== Certifications ==
Region	Certification	Certified units/sales
United Kingdom (BPI)	Gold	500,000^{^}
^{^} Shipments figures based on certification alone.

== See also ==
- List of number-one dance hits (United States)
