= Colonel Abrams (album) =

Studio album by Colonel Abrams
- Released: August 31, 1985
- Recorded: 1984–1985
- Genre: R&B, boogie, garage house
- Label: MCA
- Producer: Colonel Abrams, Cerrone, Richard Burgess, Sam Dees

Colonel Abrams chronology
| Colonel Abrams (1985) | You and Me Equals Us (1987) |

Professional ratings
Review scores
| Source | Rating |
|---|---|
| AllMusic | 4.5/5 stars |
| Christgau's Record Guide | B |

Colonel Abrams is the self-titled debut studio album by American musician Colonel Abrams, released in 1985 through MCA Records. Most of the songs were written by Abrams and his brother, Marston Freeman.

== Commercial performance ==
The album peaked at No. 13 on the R&B albums chart. It also reached No. 75 on the Billboard 200. The album features the singles "Trapped", which peaked at No. 20 on the Hot Soul Singles chart and No. 1 on the Hot Dance/Disco chart, and "I'm Not Gonna Let", which reached No. 7 on the Hot Soul Singles chart and No. 1 on the Hot Dance/Disco chart. In addition, all the cuts of the album reached the top of the Hot Dance/Disco chart.

== Track listing ==
All tracks are written by Colonel Abrams and Marston Freeman, except where noted.

Side one
| No. | Title | Writer(s) | Length |
|---|---|---|---|
| 1. | "The Truth" | | 4:45 |
| 2. | "Speculation" | | 5:00 |
| 3. | "Never Change" | Colonel Abrams, Sam Dees | 5:47 |
| 4. | "Picture Me in Love with You" | | 4:30 |

Side two
| No. | Title | Length |
|---|---|---|
| 5. | "Trapped" | 3:41 |
| 6. | "I'm Not Gonna Let You" | 4:48 |
| 7. | "Over and Over" | 4:24 |
| 8. | "Margaux" | 5:50 |
| 9. | "Table for Two" | 2:44 |

== Personnel ==
- Steven Machat - executive producer
- Gianni Versace - "clothes and location"
- Chris Duffy - photography

== Charts ==
=== Weekly charts ===
| Chart (1985–1986) | Peak position |
|---|---|
| US Billboard 200 | 75 |
| US Top R&B/Hip-Hop Albums (Billboard) | 13 |

=== Year-end charts ===
| Chart (1986) | Position |
|---|---|
| US Top R&B/Hip-Hop Albums (Billboard) | 37 |

=== Singles ===
| Year | Single | Peaks | |
| Year | Single | US R&B | US Dan |
|---|---|---|---|
| 1985 | "Trapped" | 20 | 1 |
| 1985 | "The Truth" | 78 | — |
| 1986 | "I'm Not Gonna Let You" | 7 | 1 |
| 1986 | "Over and Over" | 68 | 45 |
| 1986 | "Speculation" | — | 15 |
