= Roland System-100M =

Synthesizer introduced in the 1980s

System-100M
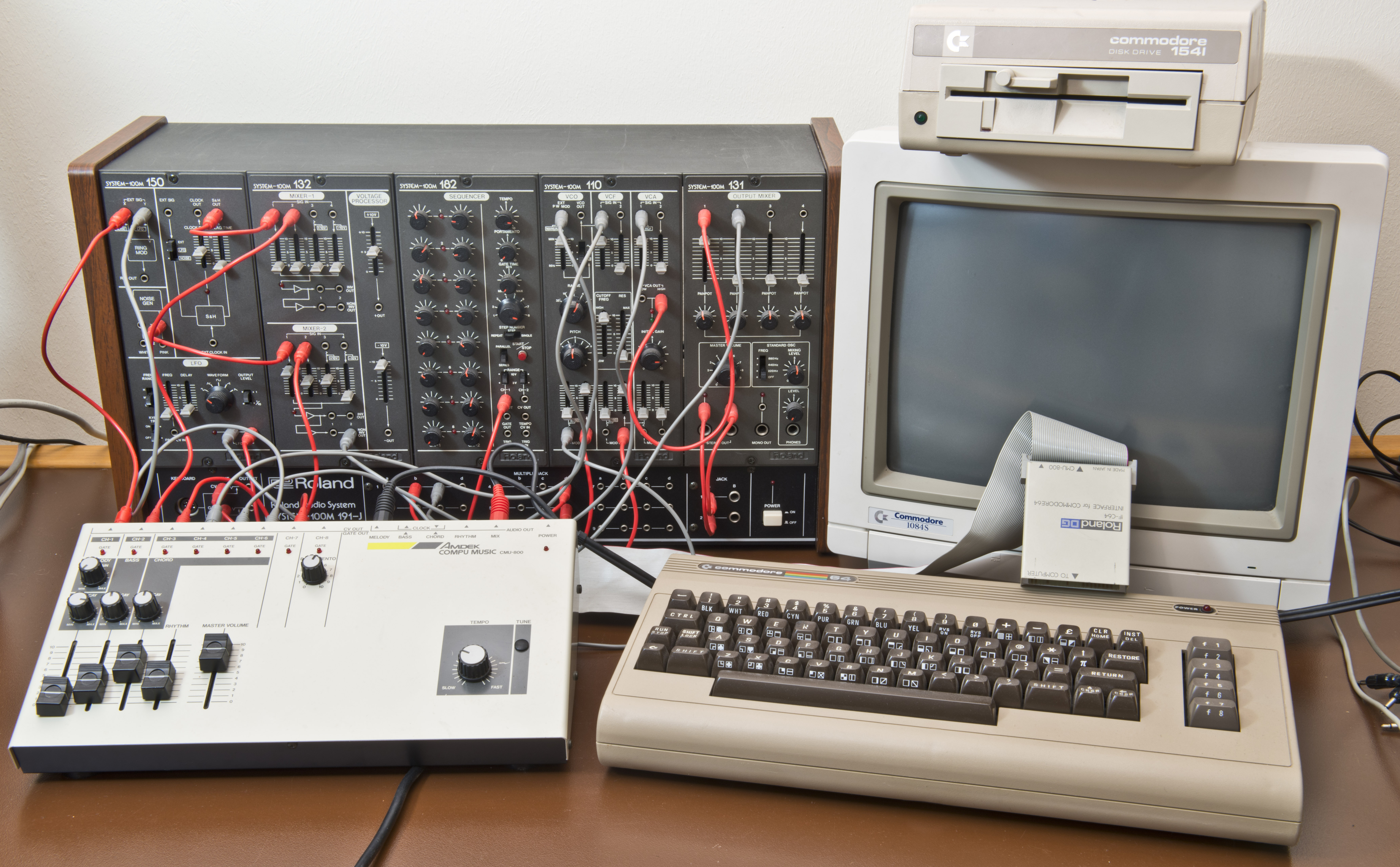
- A Roland System-100M (top left) controlled by a Commodore 64
- Manufacturer: Roland Corporation
- Dates: 1979-c.1984
- Price: £1242 for 5-module system with monophonic keyboard

Technical specifications
- Polyphony: Depends on chosen modules. Usually monophonic or 4-voice polyphonic.
- Oscillator: Each VCO has triangle, falling sawtooth, and pulse output (110, 112 modules)
- LFO: Each voltage-controlled LFO has sine, triangle, square, rising sawtooth, and falling sawtooth output (140, 150 modules); the manually set LFO has triangle output only (172 module)
- Synthesis type: Analog subtractive
- Filter: low-pass (110, 121 modules)
- Effects: Phase shifter and BBD-based audio delay available (172 module)

Input/output
- Keyboard: 32 keys, monophonic (180 keyboard); 49 keys, monophonic (181 keyboard); 49 keys, 4-voice polyphonic (184 keyboard)
- Left-hand control: Pitch bend (181 and 184 keyboards only); portamento on/off (181 only); automated arpeggio (184 only)

The Roland System-100M is a modular analog synthesizer manufactured by the Roland Corporation in the late 1970s and early 1980s. It was the successor of the Roland System-100, a semi-modular keyboard.

In the 1980s, shortly after its introduction, Richard Burgess of Landscape called the 100M "one of the best synthesisers on the market, with so many control functions available independently, whereas most synths only have one or two LFOs to do all the modulating." Ian Boddy considered the System 100M "an almost ideal introduction to the world of modular synthesis," and praised its oscillator sync sound, especially when sampled to achieve polyphony.

By the 1990s, although digital synthesizers were starting to replace analog ones, several prominent musicians still enthused about their 100Ms. Jack Dangers of Meat Beat Manifesto said "the best thing about it is that it's modular and it uses a patchbay, so you can send things back on themselves and get, like, analogue feedback, you really can... You can do cross-modulation, too. It's pretty good for external sound sources, as well." Chris Carter called it "as versatile, expandable, and affordable a system as you can get without going the DIY route" in 1995.

== Components ==
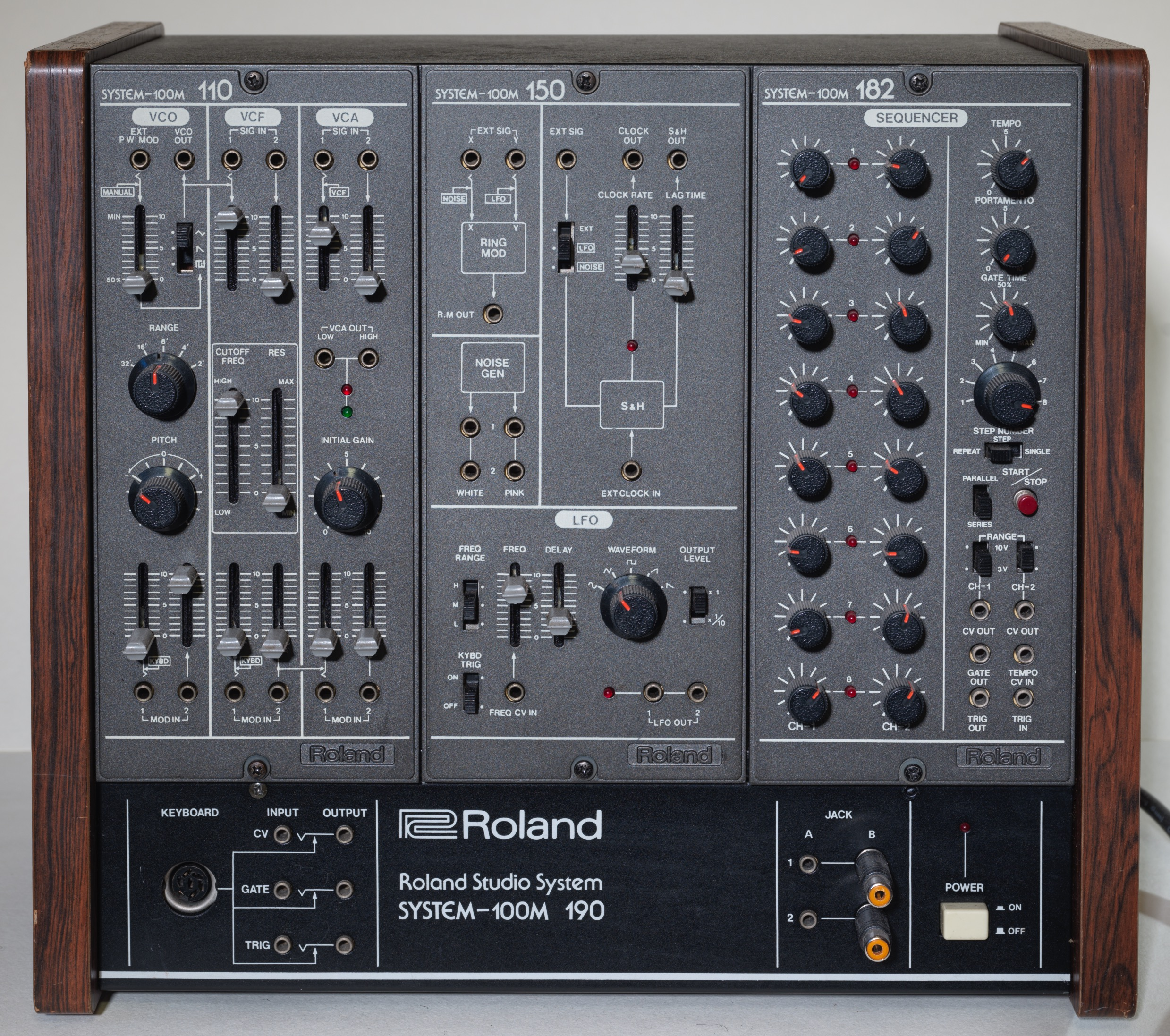
A Roland System-100M with 3 modules

Model	Type	Released	Description
110	Module	1979	VCO / VCF / VCA
111	Module	Prototype	VCO / VCF
112	Module	1979	Dual VCOs
120	Module	Prototype	VCF / VCA
121	Module	1979	Dual VCFs
130	Module	1979	Dual VCAs
131	Module	1980	Output Mixer / Tuning Oscillator / Headphone Amp
132	Module	1980	Dual CV / Audio Mixers & Voltage Processors
140	Module	1979	Dual ADSR Envelope Generators / LFO
141	Module	Prototype	Dual Envelope / Gate Delay / Inverter-Adder
150	Module	1979	Ring Mod / Noise / S&H / LFO
160	Module	Prototype	Computer Interface
165	Module	1983	Dual Portamento Controller
170	Module	Prototype	Pitch to Voltage converter / Envelope Follower / Amp
172	Module	1980	Phase Shifter / Audio Delay / Gate Delay (with LFO)
173	Module	1983	Signal Gate & Multiple Jacks
174	Module	1983	Parametric EQ
180	Keyboard	1979	32-key Controller Keyboard
181	Keyboard	1979	49-key Controller Keyboard
182	Module	1980	Analog Sequencer
184	Keyboard	1981	49-key 4-note Polyphonic Controller Keyboard
190	Rack	1979	Three-Module Rack
191J	Rack	1979	Five-Module Rack

== New Modules ==
Model	Type	Released	Description
185	Module	2009/2021	Multi-stage Sequencer by RYK Modular. Updated version released 2021
175	Module	2022	Triple Vactrol Resonator by RYK Modular

== Hardware re-issues and recreations ==
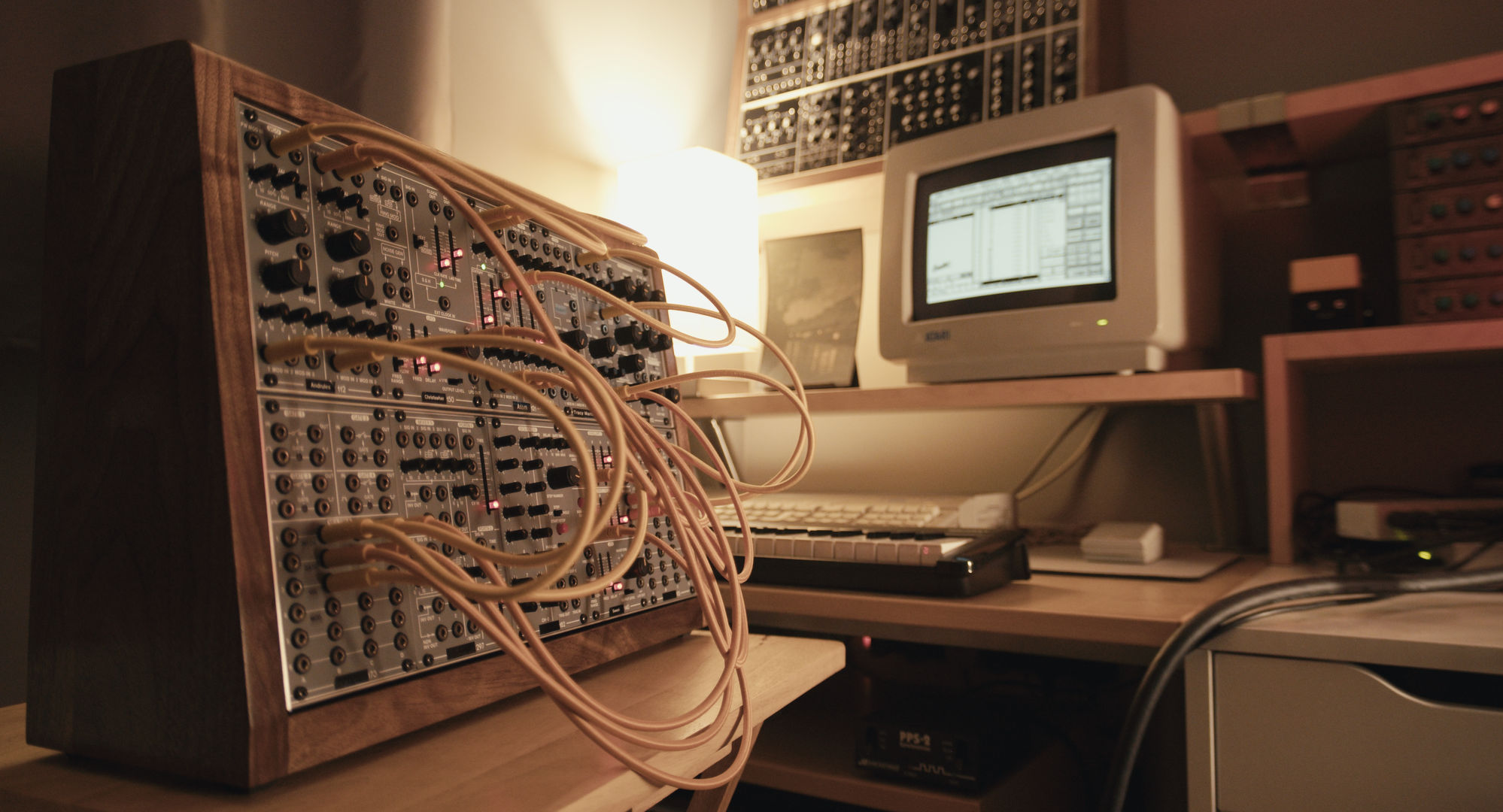
Behringer System-100M clone

In 2020, Behringer announced a series of Eurorack format modular synthesizer modules based on the original Roland System-100M modules:

- 110 VCO/VCF/VCA
- 112 Dual VCO
- 121 Dual VCF
- 130 Dual VCA
- 140 Dual Envelope/LFO
- 150 Ring Mod/Noise/S&H/LFO
- 172 Phase Shifter/Delay/LFO
- 173 Quad Gate/Multiples
- 182 Sequencer
- 297 Dual Portamento/CV Utilities (combination of 132 Dual CV / Audio Mixers & Voltage Processors & 165 Dual Portamento Controller)
- 305 EQ/Mixer/Output (combination of 131 Output Mixer / Tuning Oscillator / Headphone Amp & 174 Parametric EQ)

== Notable users ==
- Aphex Twin
- Ian Boddy
- Vince Clarke
- The Human League
- Landscape
- Meat Beat Manifesto
- Public Image Ltd
- Throbbing Gristle
