= Ayúdame a ser tuyo =

Studio album by Sergio Blass
- Released: 1998
- Recorded: 1998
- Genre: Pop
- Label: ? Records

Sergio Blass chronology
Sueño salvaje (1996)	Ayúdame a ser tuyo (1998)

Ayúdame a ser tuyo is the third album by Puerto Rican actor and singer Sergio Blass. It was released in 1998.

== Track listing ==
1. "Son así" (Robinson, Solomon, St. John) – 4:53
2. "Por un café por un helao" (Juan Eduardo, Ramiro Teran) – 4:28
3. "Completamente tocado" (Gomez, Perez) – 5:58
4. "Ámame" (Lopez, Moles) – 4:39
5. "Ayúdame a ser tuyo" (Rosa Giron, Carlos Goméz, Mariano Perez) – 4:15
6. "Tiriti" (Losada, Perez) – 3:38
7. "Ella provoca" (Losada, Perez) – 4:16
8. "Taxi" (Camacho, Joaquín Sabina) – 3:53
9. "Embustero" (Oscar DePalma, Elio DePalma) – 4:15
10. "Amor multiplicado por dos" (Lopez, Pinilla) – 3:39
11. "Miénteme" (Ketama, Perez) – 5:09

== Personnel ==
- Isaías G. Asbun – mixing
- Mariano Perez Bautista – producer
- Sergio Blass – vocals, backing vocals
- Juan Carlos – backing vocals
- Juan Cerro – acoustic guitar
- Carlos Goméz – arranger, string director
- Javier Losada – arranger, keyboards, sequencing
- Carlos Martos – engineer
- Arturo Medellin – art direction
- Andy Pask – bass
- Mariano Perez – percussion, mixing
- David Revuelto – arranger, keyboards, sequencing
- Carlos Somonte – photography
- Mariana Somonte – wardrobe coordinator
