= Andy Pask =

English composer and musician (born 1955)

- Born: Andrew Howard Pask; 30 August 1955 (age 71); Islington, London, England
- Education: Royal Academy of Music
- Genres: Rock; pop; jazz
- Occupations: Musician; composer
- Instruments: Bass guitar; double bass
- Years active: 1974–present

Andrew Howard Pask (born 30 August 1955) is an English musician who was a member of the synth-pop band Landscape. He co-wrote the theme to the TV show The Bill.

== Early years ==
Andy Pask was a pupil at Haileybury College in Hertfordshire, where he played cello in school orchestras and bass guitar in school bands. He began his music career as a chorister in the choir of New College, Oxford, studied cello and double bass at the Royal Academy of Music in London and was a member of the National Youth Jazz Orchestra. After leaving college, he went on to become a founding member of the band Landscape.

== Landscape ==
Landscape was formed in 1974 with Richard James Burgess (vocals, drums), Christopher Heaton (keyboards), Andy Pask (bass), Peter Thoms (trombone, keyboards), and John Walters (keyboards, woodwinds). The band built a following through live performances and touring before releasing their debut album Landscape in 1979. Their next album in 1981, From the Tea-Rooms of Mars...to the Hell-Holes of Uranus led to the Top Five U.K. hit "Einstein A-Go-Go." Their third album in 1982, Manhattan Boogie-Woogie was well received as a dance album. After release of this album, Heaton and Thoms left the band and it became the trio Landscape III. The trio disbanded in 1984.

== Later career ==
During his time in Landscape and after the band broke up, Pask has also had a varied career in freelance live and session work, appearing on albums for a number of well-known artists, including Freddie Mercury, Riccardo Cocciante, Sharleen Spiteri, Jimmy Somerville, Madonna, Pet Shop Boys, Shirley Bassey, The Mood, Five Star, Gloria Gaynor, Cliff Richard, China Crisis, Manfred Mann's Earth Band, Tom Jones, Bananarama, Steve Marriot, Ronan Keating, Hue & Cry, Nana Mouskouri, Ray Conniff, Debbie Harry, Michael Ball, Elaine Paige, Tracie Bennet, New London Chorale, Zbigniew Preisner, Mary J Blige, Katherine Jenkins, Patricia Kaas and Laura Mvula, . He has also worked on countless albums for the Spanish and South American markets and recorded many albums as a rhythm section member for all the main London orchestras.

Pask also began writing and performing for theatre, TV and film soundtracks. He has appeared on soundtracks for The Chronicles of Narnia: The Voyage of the Dawn Treader, Robin Hood, How to Train Your Dragon 1 & 2, The Mummy: Tomb of the Dragon Emperor, Leap Year, Nine, the Twilight films, Shanghai Noon, Last Orders, Spy Kids, The Guru, Calendar Girls, Gosford Park, The Recruit, Little Shop of Horrors, Hugo, Hotel Transylvania, ParaNorman, The Hobbit, Seven Psychopaths, Red 2, World War Z, Mr. Peabody and Sherman, The Full Monty, Maleficent, Jupiter Ascending, Exodus: Gods and Kings, The Hunger Games: Mockingjay, Legend, Dumbo, Interstellar, Wonder Woman, Maleficent: Mistress of Evil, Spectre, The Boss Baby, Dunkirk, Widows. He has worked on film and concert projects in Poland with Zbigniew Preisner and at the Ghent film festival with Hans Zimmer. Work for other film composers include: Alan Silvestri, James Newton Howard, Micheal Giacchino, Howard Shore, Danny Elfman, Randy Edelman and David Arnold.

As a composer, Pask's most successful work is "Overkill", theme to the long running police series, The Bill, written with Charlie Morgan.

Pask has also toured extensively with many artists including Glen Campbell, Elaine Paige, Veronique Sanson, Petula Clark and three world tours as a member of the Hans Zimmer band. He has also performed concerts and tours for over thirty years with the Royal Philharmonic Orchestra.

In the television world, Pask was resident bass player on the chat shows Wogan and Barrymore, has supplied the bass for all the Stars in their Eyes shows and recorded tracks for Pop Idol and Pop Stars - the Rivals. Other TV house band membership includes: The Rock Gospel Show, Ruby Wax, Surprise Surprise, Brian Conley, Miss World, Children in Need, Royal Variety shows, Des O’Connor tonight, Songs of Praise, The Paul Daniels show, Night Fever, Friday Night is Music Night with the BBC concert Orchestra and the Generation Game.
