= Colonel Abrams =

American musician

Background information
- Born: Colonel Abrams; May 25, 1949; Detroit, Michigan, U.S.
- Origin: New York City, U.S.
- Died: November 24, 2016 (aged 67)
- Genres: R&B, soul, house, electronic dance
- Occupations: Singer; songwriter
- Instruments: Vocals, guitar, piano
- Years active: 1976–2016
- Labels: MCA; Scotti Bros. Acid Jazz; Strictly Rhythm

Colonel Abrams (May 25, 1949 – November 24, 2016) was an American musician, singer, and songwriter.

== Early life ==
Colonel Abrams was born in Detroit, Michigan. His family later moved to East 13 Street, in Manhattan's East Village.

== Career ==
From an early age, Abrams began playing the guitar and piano. He was in several early bands; among them Heavy Impact – in which he played both guitar and keyboards alongside Joe Wells (guitar), Lemar Washington (guitar), Marston "Buffy" Freeman (bass guitar), Ronald Simmons (drums), Harry Jones (trumpet), Tony Molière (trumpet) and Barbara Mills (saxophone). In 1976, he formed Conservative Manor, 94 East (the band featuring Prince on lead guitar).

He became popular on the New York underground scene via radio and club play, and had his first major hit in 1984 with "Music Is the Answer", on the independent label Streetwise. Other hits in the mid-1980s included "Leave the Message Behind the Door", "Trapped" (a top ten hit in Germany, Ireland, the Netherlands, and the UK), "The Truth", "Speculation", "I'm Not Gonna Let You", and "Over and Over", establishing Abrams as a solo artist, initially in Europe and later in the US.

In 1985, he signed with Steven Machat's label and production company AMI. Machat, who was collaborating and working with a British producer, Richard James Burgess, hired Burgess to produce Abrams' self-titled debut album. Machat then arranged for MCA Records to sign Abrams for worldwide releases. Burgess produced the songs "Trapped"(1985), "I'm Not Gonna Let "(1986), and "Table for Two".

"Trapped" reached the top five in the UK Singles Chart and topped the US Hot Dance Music/Club Play chart in 1985, followed by his self-titled album, which spent two weeks at number one the following year. An electronic remix of "Trapped" was later released in 1995 by Boards of Canada, under the pseudonym Hell Interface. A new version of "Trapped" ("Trapped 2006") was released in the UK.

"I'm Not Gonna Let" also spent a week at number one in the dance chart, in 1986. The album peaked at number 75 on the US Billboard Top 200 and Number 13 on the US Top R&B/Hip-Hop Albums chart. Although Abrams had no American pop hits during his career, he had a number of entries on the US Hot Dance Club Play chart in the 1980s and 1990s, including four entries that hit number one. In 1987, he had his fourth number-one US dance hit with "How Soon We Forget", the same year that he released his second album, You and Me Equals Us.

On January 9, 2007, Abrams released the single "Just When You Thought", the third single on his own record label, Colonel Records, after "Heartbreaker" and "Let Us All Be Friends". Also in 2007, Abrams released "Never Be", "Just Like Mathematics", and "True Stories".

== Later life and illness ==
A crowdfunding campaign was launched in 2015, via GoFundMe, in order to help Abrams, as he was homeless, suffering from diabetes, and in poor health. Marshall Jefferson, who had begun his own effort to crowdfund an album, encouraged others to donate to Abrams instead, stating:

As most of you may or may not know, a lot of recording artists don’t have medical coverage or benefits ... Those of us who have listened to his awesome music and know of his plight, have banded together to try to help him through this rough patch.

== Death ==
Abrams died on Thanksgiving Day, November 24, 2016, at the age of 67. Numerous music industry luminaries paid tribute, including Tony Tune Herbert, Joey Negro, Dave Pearce, and Swizz Beatz. Jellybean Benitez, a producer who worked on Madonna's "Holiday" and Whitney Houston's "Love Will Save the Day", wrote: "It's a sad day for the house-music community". Marshall Jefferson wrote, "Just learned Colonel Abrams passed away," and added, "Never to be forgotten, R.I.P."

== Discography ==
=== Studio albums ===
Year	Album details	Peak positions	
Year	Album details	US	US R&B
1985	Colonel Abrams: Released: August 31, 1985; Label: MCA	75	13
1987	You and Me Equals Us: Released: August 25, 1987; Label: MCA	—	25
1992	About Romance: Released: March 10, 1992; Label: Acid Jazz, Scotti Bros.	—	—
1996	Make a Difference: Released: May 23, 1996; Label: Music USA	—	—
"—" denotes releases that did not chart.

=== Compilation albums ===
- Best of Colonel Abrams (1999, Universal Special Products)
- Strapped: The Best of the Remixes (2010, Famous)

=== Singles ===
Year	Single	Peak chart positions						Certifications	Album
Year	Single	US R&B	US Dan	GER	IRE	NLD	UK	Certifications	Album
1984	"Leave the Message Behind the Door"	73	—	—	—	—	—		—N/a
1984	"Music Is the Answer"	—	11	—	—	—	84		—N/a
1985	"Trapped"	20	1	13	4	11	3	BPI: Gold	Colonel Abrams
1985	"The Truth" ^{[A]}	78	1	—	—	—	53		Colonel Abrams
1986	"I'm Not Gonna Let You"	7	1	—	14	—	24		Colonel Abrams
1986	"Over and Over"	68	45	—	—	—	—		Colonel Abrams
1986	"Speculation"	—	15	—	—	—	—		Colonel Abrams
1987	"How Soon We Forget"	6	1	—	—	—	75		You and Me Equals Us
1987	"Nameless"	54	—	—	—	—	—		You and Me Equals Us
1988	"Soon You'll Be Gone"	—	—	—	—	—	—		You and Me Equals Us
1990	"Bad Timing"	—	—	—	—	—	—		—N/a
1992	"You Don't Know (Somebody Tell Me)"	58	—	—	—	—	—		About Romance
1992	"When Somebody Loves Somebody"	70	—	—	—	—	—		About Romance
1992	"Never Be Another One"	—	22	—	—	—	—		About Romance
1993	"I'm Caught Up"	—	—	—	—	—	—		Make a Difference
1994	"Get with You"	—	—	—	—	—	—		Make a Difference
1994	"So Confused"	—	15	—	—	—	—		Make a Difference
1995	"So Proud"	—	—	—	—	—	—		—N/a
1995	"As Quiet as It's Kept"	—	—	—	—	—	—		Make a Difference
1998	"Heartbreaker"	—	—	—	—	—	—		—N/a
"—" denotes a recording that did not chart or was not released in that territory.

- ^{A} "The Truth" charted on the Hot Dance/Disco chart along with all tracks from the album Colonel Abrams.

== See also ==
- List of artists who reached number one on the US Dance chart
- List of Number 1 Dance Hits (United States)
