= How Soon We Forget =

Single by Colonel Abrams

from the album You and Me Equals Us
- Released: July 14, 1987
- Recorded: 1986
- Genre: House
- Label: MCA (US MCA-23568)
- Songwriter(s): Colonel Abrams, Marston Freeman

Colonel Abrams singles chronology
"Over and Over" (1986)	"How Soon We Forget" (1987)	"Nameless" (1987)

"How Soon We Forget" is a 1987 single by Colonel Abrams, from his album You and Me Equals Us. The single was Abrams' last of four number one hits on the dance play charts. "How Soon We Forget" was also Abrams' most successful single on the soul charts, reaching number six.

== Track listing ==
- 12" single

(A-side)
No.	Title	Length
1.	"How Soon We Forget (Extended Version)""	7:49
2.	"How Soon We Forget (Radio Edit)"	5:25

(B-side)
No.	Title	Length
1.	"How Soon We Forget (Dub Version)"	8:42
2.	"Trapped (A Cappella)"	5:01

== Charts ==
Weekly Charts

Chart (1987)	Peak position
US Billboard Hot Dance Club Play	1
US Billboard Hot Black Singles	6
UK Singles Chart	75
