= No. 1 (Silent Circle album) =

1986 studio album by Silent Circle

Studio album by Silent Circle
- Released: 1986
- Studio: Rainbow (Munich)
- Genre: Eurodisco
- Length: 39:05
- Label: Blow Up
- Producers: Bernd Dietrich; Engelbert Simons

Silent Circle chronology
No. 1 (1986)	Back! (1994)

Singles from No. 1
- 1. "Hide Away - Man is Comin'!" Released: April 1985; 2. "Touch in the Night" Released: October 1985; 3. "Stop the Rain in the Night" Released: 1986; 4. "Love is Just a Word" Released: July 1986

No. 1 is the debut studio album by the German Eurodisco band Silent Circle. It was released in 1986 by Blow Up in West Germany. No. 1 peaked at number 28 on the Swiss Hitparade and at number 58 on the Official German Charts.

== Track listing ==
Side one
No.	Title	Writer(s)	Length
1.	"Touch in the Night"	Axel Breitung; Bernd Dietrich; Engelbert Simons	5:18
2.	"Sib Dab Dua"	Breitung; Dietrich; Simons	3:04
3.	"Dreams"	Breitung; Dietrich; Simons; G. G. Anderson	4:00
4.	"Hide Away - Man is Comin'!"	Dietrich; Simons	3:42
5.	"Shy Girl"	Breitung; Dietrich; Simons	3:38
Total length:			19:42

Side two
No.	Title	Writer(s)	Length
1.	"Stop the Rain in the Night"	Breitung; Bernd Dietrich; Engelbert Simons	3:40
2.	"For You"	Jürgen Behrens; Martin Tychsen	1:32
3.	"Give Me Time"	Breitung; Dietrich; Simons; Anderson	3:58
4.	"Moonlight Affair"	Breitung; Dietrich; Simons	3:29
5.	"Anywhere Tonight"	Breitung; Dietrich; Simons	3:19
6.	"Love is Just a Word"	Breitung; Dietrich; Simons	3:25
Total length:			19:23

== Personnel ==
Silent Circle

- Martin Tychsen – lead vocals
- Axel Breitung – synthesizers, backing vocals
- Jürgen Behrens – electronic drums, guitars, backing vocals

Production

- Bernd Dietrich - producer
- Engelbert Simons – producer
- Frank v.d. Bottlenberg – mixing engineer

== Charts ==
Chart (1986)	Peak position
Swiss Albums (Schweizer Hitparade)	28
German Albums (Offizielle Top 100)	58
