= Sergio (album) =

Studio album by Sergio Blass
- Released: 1994
- Recorded: 1993
- Genre: Pop
- Label: SG Music

Sergio Blass chronology
Sergio (1994)	Sueño salvaje (1996)

Sergio is the debut solo album by American actor and singer Sergio Blass, formerly of Menudo. It was released in 1994.

== Track listing ==
1. "Somos la luz del mañana"
2. "No voy a llorar"
3. "Como el sol"
4. "Como jamas a nadie ame"
5. "No puedo olvidarme de ti"
6. "Siempre te amare" Spanish Version of The Police's 1983 Hit Every Breath You Take
7. "Corre bebe"
8. "Estoy buscandote"
9. "Mientes"
10. "Regresa a mi"
11. "Te perdiste lo mejor"
12. "Espérame"
13. "Chico malote"
14. "Forajido"
15. "Viento"
