= Sueño salvaje =

Studio album by Sergio Blass
- Released: 1996
- Recorded: 1996
- Genre: Pop
- Label: ? Records

Sergio Blass chronology
Sergio (1994)	Sueño salvaje (1996)	Ayúdame a ser tuyo (1998)

Sueño salvaje is the second album by Puerto Rican actor and singer Sergio Blass. It was released in 1996.

== Track listing ==
1. "Extasis de Pasión"
2. "Amiga tu"
3. "Sueño"
4. "Sin tu amor"
5. "Es mi vida"
6. "Escapar de mi amada"
7. "Solo tu"
8. "No te se perder"
9. "Fiebre"
10. "No me des vuelta a la cara"
11. "Dueña de mi amor"
12. "Soy tu tentación"
13. "Viento"
14. "Noche salvaje"
15. "Sueño" (English Version) Bonus Track*
