= From the Tea-rooms of Mars .... =

Studio album by Landscape
- Released: February 1981
- Recorded: Mid-1980 ("European Man" – late 1979/early 1980)
- Genre: Electropop
- Length: 43:40
- Label: RCA
- Producer: Landscape; Colin Thurston

Landscape chronology
Landscape (1979)	From the Tea-rooms of Mars .... (1981)	Manhattan Boogie-Woogie (1982)

Singles from From the Tea-rooms of Mars ....
- 1. "European Man" Released: 1980; 2. "Einstein a Go-Go" Released: 1981; 3. "Norman Bates" Released: 1981; 4. "European Man (reissue)" Released: 1981

Professional ratings
Review scores
Source	Rating
AllMusic	4.5/5 stars

From the Tea-rooms of Mars .... (fully titled: From the Tea-rooms of Mars .... to the Hell-holes of Uranus) is the second studio album by the English synth-pop band Landscape, released in February 1981 by RCA Records. The album contains the band's only UK singles chart hits: "Einstein a Go-Go" which reached No. 5 in April 1981 and "Norman Bates" which reached No. 40 in June of the same year.

The album was reissued in 1992 on the Mau Mau Records label. This CD also includes Landscape's debut studio album, Landscape (1979). The album was reissued again in 2002 on the Cherry Red Records label.

== Track listing ==
=== LP: RCA LP AFL1-5003 ===
From the Tea-rooms of Mars ....
No.	Title	Writer(s)	Length
1.	"European Man"	Richard James Burgess, Landscape	4:22
2.	"Shake the West Awake"	Landscape	3:24
3.	"Computer Person"	Peter Thoms, Landscape	2:59
4.	"Alpine Tragedy"/"Sisters"	Christopher Heaton, Landscape/John Walters, Burgess, Landscape	4:44
5.	"Face of the 80's"	Burgess, Walters, Landscape	3:26
6.	"New Religion"	Heaton, Burgess, Landscape	3:13

.... to the Hell-holes of Uranus
No.	Title	Writer(s)	Sub-title	Length
1.	"Einstein a Go-Go"	Walters, Burgess, Landscape		2:59
2.	"Norman Bates"	Walters, Landscape		5:36
3.	"The Doll's House"	Heaton, Burgess, Landscape		5:23
4.	"From the Tea-rooms of Mars .... to the Hell-holes of Uranus"		i. "Beguine" (Burgess, Walters, Landscape) – 2:43 ii. "Mambo" (Thoms, Heaton, Landscape) – 2:22 iii. "Tango" (Walters, Burgess, Landscape) – 2:29	7:34
Total length:				43:40

=== 2002 Cherry Red Records CD: CDMRED 209 ===
No.	Title	Writer(s)	Sub-title	Length
1.	"European Man"	Richard James Burgess, Landscape		4:23
2.	"Shake the West Awake"	Landscape		3:26
3.	"Computer Person"	Peter Thoms, Landscape		3:00
4.	"Alpine Tragedy"/"Sisters"	Christopher Heaton, Landscape/John Walters, Burgess, Landscape		4:46
5.	"Face of the 80's"	Burgess, Walters, Landscape		3:29
6.	"New Religion"	Heaton, Burgess, Landscape		3:14
7.	"Einstein a Go-Go"	Walters, Burgess, Landscape		3:26
8.	"Norman Bates"	Walters, Landscape		5:07
9.	"The Doll's House"	Heaton, Burgess, Landscape		5:19
10.	"From the Tea-rooms of Mars .... to the Hell-holes of Uranus"		i. "Beguine" (Burgess, Walters, Landscape) – 2:49 ii. "Mambo" (Thoms, Heaton, Landscape) – 2:20 iii. "Tango" (Walters, Burgess, Landscape) – 2:32	7:41
11.	"Eastern Girls"	Burgess, Heaton, Andy Pask, Thoms, Walters		3:16
12.	"It's Not My Real Name"	Burgess, Heaton, Pask, Thoms, Walters		5:24
13.	"So Good, So Pure, So Kind"	Burgess, Walters, BPW		4:26
14.	"You Know How to Hurt Me"	Burgess, Walters, BPW		6:51

- Tracks 11–12 from the album Manhattan Boogie-Woogie (1982) produced by Landscape
- Tracks 13–14 extended versions of singles released as 'Landscape III' (1983) produced by Richard James Burgess, John Walters and Andy Pask

== Personnel ==
Landscape

- Richard James Burgess – vocals, computer programming, electronic drums and percussion, synthesizers and drums. Roland MC8 microcomposer, System 100 modular synths, SDSV electronic drums, Pearl drums, claptrap, Burgess amplified percussion
- Christopher Heaton – keyboards and vocals. Yamaha CS80 polyphonic synthesizer, grand piano, Fender Rhodes piano with ring modulator and effects, Casiotone 201 digital keyboard, Minimoog, Roland vocoders, Roland Chorus Echo
- Andy Pask – bass guitar, bass synthesizers and vocals. Giffin fretted and fretless basses, Yamaha CS80, Roland ProMars synthesizer
- Peter Thoms – electronic trombone, trombone and vocals. King 3B Trombone, Barcus Berry tranducer and graphic pre-amp, Roland pitch/voltage synthesizer and Chorus Echo, MXR Blue Box
- John Walters – computer programming, wind synthesizers and vocals. Computone wind synthesizer driver and Lyricon 1, Roland MC8, ProMars and System 100 synthesizers and vocoder, Selmer MKVI soprano saxophone

== Production ==
- Producer: Landscape
- "European Man" produced by Colin Thurston and Landscape
- Engineered by: John Etchells at Jam
  John Hudson and Brian Tench at Mayfair Studios
  Hugh Padgham at Townhouse Studios
  Andy Jackson, Peter Walsh, Rafe McKenna and Peter Smith at Utopia
  Steve Rance and Graeme Jackson at Nova Suite
  Rik Walton at Workhouse
  Dave Hunt at Berry Street Studio
  David Baker at Odyssey Studios
  Colin Thurston at Red Bus
  Landscape at Southern Studios
