= You and Me Equals Us =

Studio album by Colonel Abrams
- Released: August 25, 1987
- Recorded: 1986–1987
- Genre: R&B, house
- Label: MCA
- Producer: Colonel Abrams, Ron Kersey, Boyd Jarvis, Timmy Regisford

Colonel Abrams chronology
Colonel Abrams (1985)	You and Me Equals Us (1987)	About Romance (1992)

Professional ratings
Review scores
Source	Rating
AllMusic	2/5 stars

You and Me Equals Us is the second studio album by American musician, Colonel Abrams, released in 1987 through MCA Records.

== Commercial performance ==
The album peaked at No. 25 on the R&B albums chart. The album features the singles "How Soon We Forget", which peaked at No. 6 on the Hot Soul Singles chart and No. 1 on the Hot Dance/Disco chart, and "Nameless", which reached No. 54 on the Hot Soul Singles chart.

== Track listing ==
All tracks are written by Colonel Abrams and Marston Freeman, except where noted.

Side one
No.	Title	Length
1.	"How Soon We Forget"	5:09
2.	"Relive a Memory"	3:33
3.	"Nameless"	5:22
4.	"Can't Stay Away"	4:05
5.	"Soon You'll Be Gone"	4:30

Side two
No.	Title	Writer(s)	Length
6.	"You and Me Equals Us"		3:35
7.	"Caught in the Middle"	Ron Kersey, Harold Johnson	3:34
8.	"When a Man Loves"	Peter Lord, Jeff Smith	4:35
9.	"Running"		3:53
10.	"Fame and Fantasy"		5:14

== Personnel ==
- Ron Kersey - keyboards
- Norman Harris - guitar on "Caught in the Middle"
- Boyd Jarvis - bass synthesizer on "Running"
- Bruce A Miller - Mixing engineer, while album

== Charts ==
Album

Chart (1987)	Peak position
US Top R&B/Hip-Hop Albums (Billboard)	25

Singles

Title	Peak positions	
Title	US R&B	US Dance
"How Soon We Forget"	6	1
"Nameless"	54	—
