= Peter Thoms =

- Born: 8 October 1947 (age 78)
- Occupations: Musician; composer
- Instruments: Trombone; keyboards
- Years active: 1974–present
- Formerly of: Landscape

Peter Thoms (born 8 October 1947) is an Australian musician and composer best known for playing keyboards and trombone for the synth-pop band Landscape.

== Biography ==
Landscape was formed in 1974 with Richard James Burgess (vocals, drums), Christopher Heaton (keyboards), Andy Pask (bass guitar), Peter Thoms (trombone, keyboards), and John Walters (keyboards, woodwinds). The band built a following through live performances and touring before releasing their debut album Landscape in 1980. Their next album in 1981, From the Tea-rooms of Mars .... to the Hell-holes of Uranus led to the top 5 UK hit "Einstein A-Go-Go". Their third studio album in 1982, Manhattan Boogie-Woogie was well received as a dance album. After release of this album, Heaton and Thoms left the band and it became the trio Landscape III, which disbanded in 1984.

After Landscape broke up, Thoms went into sessions work, appearing with various artists, including Kylie Minogue, Tina Turner, Jools Holland, Roger Waters, Pete Townshend and Midge Ure. He also appeared on Thomas Dolby's 1984 album The Flat Earth and toured with Dolby that year playing trombone. He currently serves as a Sessions Official at the Musicians' Union's head office in Britain.
