= I'm Not Gonna Let You =

Single by Colonel Abrams

from the album Colonel Abrams
- Released: 1985 (North America), January 27, 1986 (UK)
- Recorded: March – July 1985
- Genre: Electronic
- Length: 4:48 (album version); 3:51 (radio edit)
- Label: MCA
- Songwriters: Colonel Abrams, Marston Freeman
- Producers: Colonel Abrams, Richard Burgess

Colonel Abrams singles chronology
"The Truth" (1985)	"I'm Not Gonna Let You" (1985)	"Over and Over" (1986)

"I'm Not Gonna Let You" (originally titled "I'm Not Gonna Let") is a single by Colonel Abrams, released in late 1985 in North America and on January 27, 1986 in the UK. It was the third single taken from his self-titled 1985 debut album, Colonel Abrams. It was also his third number one on the U.S. dance chart and second top 20 hit on the U.S. R&B singles chart. In the UK, "I'm Not Gonna Let You" reached number 24 on the UK Singles Chart.

The UK 12" single of "I'm Not Gonna Let You" is notable for the earliest known documented use of the term percapella, indicating a remix using only vocals and rhythm elements. The term first appeared in a contemporary review by James Hamilton in Record Mirror, published two days prior to the record's release. Soon after, the term was found on other 12" singles, including "Come Get My Love" by TKA, "Ain't Nobody Ever Loved You" by Aretha Franklin, "She Don't Want You" by Sequal, "Only In My Dreams" by Debbie Gibson, and the 1986 reissue of "Running" by Information Society.

== Track listing ==
7": MCA / 1031 United Kingdom

1. "I'm Not Gonna Let You" - 3:02
2. "I'm Not Gonna Let You" (Percapella Mix) - 4:56

7": MCA / 52773 United States

1. "I'm Not Gonna Let You" (Radio Edit) - 3:47
2. "I'm Not Gonna Let You" (Instrumental) - 4:58

12": MCA / X1031 United Kingdom

1. "I'm Not Gonna Let You" (Extended Version) - 6:56
2. "I'm Not Gonna Let You" (Dub) - 5:46
3. "Trapped" (Extended Version) - 6:30
4. "I'm Not Gonna Let You" (Percappella Mix) - 4:56

12": MCA / 23612 United States

1. "I'm Not Gonna Let" (Extended Version) - 6:56
2. "I'm Not Gonna Let" (Radio Edit) - 3:51
3. "I'm Not Gonna Let" (Dub) - 5:46
4. "I'm Not Gonna Let" (A Cappella) - 3:46
- Remixes by Timmy Regisford

== Charts ==
Chart (1986)	Peak position
UK Singles (Official Charts)	24
US Hot R&B/Hip-Hop Songs (Billboard)	7
