= The Hunger Games: Mockingjay =

The Hunger Games: Mockingjay is a two-part film based on the 2010 Suzanne Collins novel Mockingjay. The films are:

- The Hunger Games: Mockingjay – Part 1 (2014), the first part of the two-part film
- The Hunger Games: Mockingjay – Part 2 (2015), the second part of the two-part film
