= King 3B =

Musical instrument

The King 3B is a small-bore trombone currently manufactured by Conn-Selmer, Inc and sold as the "King 2103 Legend 3B." Popular with professional jazz musicians, the older models from the 1960s are known for their brilliant tone and fluidity in the upper register. One of several models of King trombones, the 3B has a .508-inch (12.9 mm) bore (the inside diameter of the inner slide) and an 8-inch (200 mm) bell. It is available with a yellow brass, gold brass, or sterling silver bell, with an F attachment, or as a valve trombone. The King 3B fits a small shank mouthpiece,

Originally manufactured by the H.N. White Company, King trombones are named for Thomas King, a solo trombonist with the Lyceum Theatre Orchestra in Cleveland, Ohio who during the late 19th century worked with instrument manufacturer Henderson N. White to design and build a new trombone. King trombones quickly gained acclaim with trombonists due to their superior sound quality and quick slide movement; one of the company's greatest endorsers was "The Sentimental Gentleman of Swing," Tommy Dorsey. Production of King Concert 3B model trombones started around 1951-53 as a larger version of the King Liberty 2B trombones (originally produced in 1938 as the King Liberty Model no. 2-B). They remained unchanged until the company was sold in 1965. From 1965 to 1985 they were manufactured and sold by King Musical Instruments until the company was sold again to United Musical Instruments (UMI), formerly C.G. Conn and currently Conn-Selmer, Inc
