= Silent Circle =

German band

- Origin: West Germany
- Genres: Eurodisco; Eurodance
- Years active: 1985–present
- Labels: WMG; Ariola
- Members: Martin Tychsen; Axel Breitung; Jürgen Behrens
- Website: silentcircle.de

Silent Circle is a German Eurodisco band formed in West Germany in 1985. The band consists of vocalist Martin Tychsen (Jo Jo Tyson), keyboardist & composer Axel Breitung, and drummer Jürgen Behrens (CC Behrens).

== History ==
Silent Circle first performed in 1979, but soon parted ways. In the early '80s, the trio reformed and decided to form a more solid group, marking the beginning of Silent Circle. Their first single, "Hide Away - Man is Comin'!", gained considerable limelight. It was followed by a number of other successful singles like "Touch in the Night", "Stop the Rain", "Love is Just a Word" and "Time for Love".

In 1986, they released their first album No. 1, consisting of 11 songs. The album was launched under the Blow-Up label of Intercord Company. Meanwhile, Harald Shaefer replaced Axel Breitung for public performances. The band's founder and leader then devoted himself totally to writing and producing new songs.

In 1987, 2 singles were released on Teldec, "Danger Danger" and "Oh, Don't Lose Your Heart Tonight". In 1990, another album was released by Silent Circle, containing 10 songs, two from 1987 and two remixes. In 1993, a compilation entitled Best Of Silent Circle was released and contained only remixed and other versions of their old songs. In 1994, a new album was released entitled Back, containing 12 new songs. In 1998, they released another album entitled Stories 'bout Love, with 12 new songs.

== Discography ==
=== Albums ===
- No. 1 (1986)
- Back! (1994)
- Stories 'bout Love (1998)

=== Singles ===
- "Hide Away – Man Is Comin'!" (1985)
- "Touch in the Night" (1985)
- "After Dark Tia Maria" (1985)
- "Stop the Rain" / "Shy Girl" (1986)
- "Love Is Just a Word" (1986)
- "Time for Love" (1986)
- "Danger Danger" (1987)
- "Oh, Don't Lose Your Heart Tonight" (1987)
- "Moonlight Affair" (1987)
- "I Am Your Believer" (1989)
- "What a Shame" (1989)
- "2night" (1993)
- "Every Move, Every Touch" (1994)
- "Egyptian Eyes" (promo only) (1996)
- "Touch in the Night '98" (1998)
- "One More Night" (1998)
- "Night Train" (1999)
- "I Need a Woman" (2000)
- "Moonlight Affair 2001" (feat. MMX) (2001)
- "2 Night" (2018)
- "Every Move Every Touch" (2018)

=== Compilation albums ===
- Best of Silent Circle (1993, Dusty Records)
- Back II (1997, Dusty Records)
- Touch in the Night (limited edition) (1998, VMP International)
- Their Greatest Hits of the 90's (2000, AWP Records)
- Turbo Disco (2002, Фирма Грамзаписи Никитин)
- Deluxe Collection - The best of Silent Circle (2005)
- Silent Circle & Italio Disco Stars - Hits & More Mix (2007, Eurodisco Production)
- The best (2010, Танцевальный Рай)
- 25 Years - The Anniversary Album (2010, Spectre Media)
- Hits & More (2010, Hargent Media)
- The Original Maxi-Singles Collection (2014, Pokorny Music Solutions)
- Touch in the night - Hits & more (2015, Hargent Media)
- Chapter Euro Dance (2018)
- Chapter 80's — Unreleased Songs (2018)
- Chapter Italo Dance — 2 Part Unreleased Songs (2018)
- My star (2020, DA Records)
- Stories - The remix album (2020)
- Luxury (2021)
- Lost in space - Deluxe edition (2021)
- The Second: Singles 1985-1989 (2024)
