= The Mood =

British pop band

- Origin: York, North Yorkshire, England
- Genres: Synth-pop, new wave
- Years active: 1980-1984
- Labels: Romantic, RCA
- Past members: John Moore; Mark James Fordyce; Eric James Logan; John Dalby; Steve Carter
- Website: themood.uk

The Mood were a British synth-pop band from 1980 to 1984, formed in York, North Yorkshire, England. It consisted of members John Moore, Mark James and Eric James (the latter no relation, as their real names were Mark James Fordyce and Eric James Logan). They had three Top 75 singles in the UK Singles Chart with "Don’t Stop", "Paris Is One Day Away", and "Passion In Dark Rooms" in 1982.

== Career ==
The Mood were formed in 1980 by John Moore, who had previously played with local bands around York, and then it was followed by the two James, Eric James Logan (born in Glasgow, Scotland) on keyboards and Mark James Fordyce (born in Edinburgh, Scotland) on drums. Musical influences included Tubeway Army, Kraftwerk, Can, Yellow Magic Orchestra, Telex, OMD and David Bowie. Both the music and image of Japan and Roxy Music were influential on the band.

The Mood released a single on a local small independent record label, Romantic Records, entitled "Is There a Reason". In 1981 they were a five-piece band, and with Moore and the two James were Steve Carter and John Dalby who both left for pastures new shortly after. After the band reshuffle, the three remaining members of The Mood John, Mark and Eric signed to RCA Records in 1981, and released a new re-produced mix of "Is There a Reason". Then came "Don't Stop", a No. 1 on the first UK Dance Chart. Neither track reached the Top 40 in the UK Singles Chart, and the follow-up "Paris is One Day Away" stalled at No. 42. Two places higher might have got them a slot on BBC Television's music programme, Top of the Pops. However, they did appear on the popular children's programme, Razzmatazz performing "Don't Stop".

Follow up singles were "Passion in Dark Rooms" with "The Munich Thing" on the B-side, and a final single, "I Don't Need Your Love Now". The band split up in 1984. A mini-LP was released in the US, although no album was released in the UK.

After the band split up, Moore and James (Fordyce) formed another group, Pleasure Company, but split shortly after.

Eric James (Logan) formed his own group, STRANGELANDS as lead singer/guitarist/songwriter and played regularly round the London pub venue circuit signing a new record deal and supported A-ha during their 1991 World tour in the UK.

John Moore reformed The Mood (without Mark or Eric) briefly in 1992, with Paul Atkinson (bass) and Steve Bradley (drums). The band gigged regularly in the north of England – playing mostly new, rock based material – before changing their name to Wild, and subsequently splitting up in late 1993.

All The Mood singles were released on a nineteen track album by Cherry Red Records (licensed from Sony/BMG) on 21 July 2008, titled The Singles Collection, which included all the singles and b-sides, plus the additional tracks from their US album. Over the years the Mood have received many Silver, Gold and Platinium Disc Awards from their appearances on many million selling compilation albums around the world, from their very first Platinium disc for ‘Action Trax’ 1982 (N# 2 UK album chart) through to the more recent ‘100 Hits 80’s Pop’ 2017, ‘The Best Electronic Album In The World…Ever!’ 2019 (N# 2 UK album chart) the ‘N#1 80’s Synth Pop Album’ 2022 (N# 29 UK album chart) and most recent ‘Now 80’s 12” 1982 (part two)’ 2024, and ‘NOW Yearbook - THE VAULT: 1982’ released 2026 (N# 5 UK album chart).

== Present day ==
Mark James (Fordyce) is currently the managing director of Sugarstar, a website that provides "pre-cleared" music for use in television, commercials and films; and chairman/founder of York Data Services, a business internet service provider in North Yorkshire and John Moore lead singer, guitarist is still residing in York.

The Mood had reaquired their master rights from RCA/Sony in 2024. Eric and Mark returned to remix and digitally remaster all of these recordings, some that have never seen the light of day in all this time, particularly the album and many tracks they recorded that were never released. In November 13th, 2024, the group released 7” singles titled ‘The Singles 1981-1984’ on major digital streaming platforms along with a website TheMood.UK, hosting a collector's vinyl album download and CD of ‘The Singles 1981-1984’ can be ordered. In May 10th, 2026, the group released a 12” version of the album ‘The 12” Extended Mixes’ Remastered 2026 available as special edition vinyl, CD and download from their website TheMood.UK and plan to work on future recordings.

== Discography ==
=== Albums ===
- Passion in Dark Rooms (1983) (US only release)
- The Singles Collection (2008)
- The Singles 1981-1984 (2024)
- The 12” Extended Mixes (2026)

=== Singles ===
- "Is There a Reason" (1981)
- "Is There a Reason" (re-recording) (1981)
- "Don't Stop" (1982) – UK No. 59
- "Paris Is One Day Away" (1982) – UK No. 42
- "Passion in Dark Rooms" / "The Munich Thing" (1983) – UK No. 74
- "I Don't Need Your Love Now" (1984)
