= Landscape (band) =

English synth-pop band

Background information
- Origin: London, United Kingdom
- Genres: Synth-pop; electronic; new wave; jazz-rock
- Years active: 1975–1983
- Labels: Event Horizon; RCA
- Past members: Richard James Burgess; Christopher Heaton; Andy Pask; Peter Thoms; John Walters
- Website: landscape.band

Landscape were an English synth-pop band, best known for the 1981 hits "Einstein a Go-Go" and "Norman Bates". Formed in London in 1975, the band toured constantly during the mid-to-late-1970s, playing rock, punk and jazz venues and releasing two instrumental EPs on its own Event Horizon label. The group began experimenting with computer-programmed music and electronic drums in the late 1970s and early 1980s, making records in the emerging genre of synth-pop.

== Formation ==
Landscape was composed of Richard James Burgess (drums, computer programming, synths, vocals), Christopher Heaton (keyboard synthesizers, piano, vocals), Andy Pask (fretted and fretless basses, bass synth, vocals), Peter Thoms (trombone, electric trombone, vocals), and John L. Walters (lyricon, soprano sax, alto flute, computer programming, synths, vocals). The band built a following through live performances, touring and founding the indie label Event Horizon, through which it released two EPs. After signing with RCA, the band released its debut studio album Landscape in 1979. It's next studio album in 1981, From the Tea-rooms of Mars ...., included the Top 5 UK hit "Einstein a Go-Go" and "Norman Bates". Their third studio album was 1982's Manhattan Boogie-Woogie. After release of this album, Heaton and Thoms left the band.

== Landscape III ==
Following the release of Landscape's third and final studio album, Manhattan Boogie-Woogie, the band became a trio, composed of Burgess, Pask, and Walters. Renaming the band Landscape III, the members went on to release the singles "So Good, So Pure, So Kind" and "You Know How to Hurt Me". The trio broke up in 1984 and band members went on to separate careers.

== Subsequent careers ==
Burgess, Heaton and Walters went on to careers in music production. Walters co-founded CD journal Unknown Public, in 1992 with Laurence Aston and worked widely as a writer and editor. He has been the editor of Eye since 1999, and its co-owner since 2008. Pask worked as a session musician and co-wrote the theme music for the long-running British ITV series The Bill. Thoms later appeared on Thomas Dolby's second studio album The Flat Earth (1984) and toured with Dolby that year playing trombone. He also served as a member of staff at the Musicians' Union's head office in Britain.

== Discography ==
=== Studio albums ===
Year	Album	UK	Label
1979	Landscape	–	RCA
1981	From the Tea-rooms of Mars ....	13	RCA
1982	Manhattan Boogie-Woogie	–	RCA

=== Singles ===
Year	Single	UK
1979	"Japan"	–
1979	"Sonja Henie"	–
1980	"European Man"	–
1981	"Einstein a Go-Go"	5
1981	"Norman Bates"	40
1981	"European Man" (reissue)	76
1982	"Eastern Girls"	–
1982	"It's Not My Real Name"	–
1983	"So Good, So Pure, So Kind" as 'Landscape III'	96
1983	"You Know How to Hurt Me" as 'Landscape III'	–

=== EPs ===
- "U2XME1X2MUCH" / "Don't Gimme No Rebop" / "Sixteen" (1977) 33⅓ rpm 7" ^{*}
- "Workers Playtime" / "Nearly Normal" / "Too Many Questions (Don't Ask Me Why)" (1978) 33⅓ rpm 7"

^{*} "U2XME1X2MUCH" is short for "You two-timed me one time too much"

Both EPs were issued on Landscape's own Event Horizon label.

=== Cassette album ===
- 1975: Thursday the 12th, Jaguar JS5

This album (under the name John Walters' Landscape) was released on Gordon Beck's cassette-only label Jaguar.

=== Radio session tracks ===
- "Kaptin Whorlix"
- "Gotham City"
- "Lost in the Small Ads"
- "Workers' Playtime"

Recorded for an April 1978 Peel Session.
