= John L. Walters =

English musician, composer & critic (born 1953)

- Born: John L. Walters; 16 April 1953 (age 72); Chesterfield, Derbyshire, England
- Occupations: Musician; composer; journalist; editor
- Instruments: Keyboards; woodwinds
- Years active: 1974–present

John L. Walters (born 16 April 1953) is an English editor, musician, critic and composer.

== Early years ==
John L. Walters was born on 16 April 1953 in Chesterfield, Derbyshire, England. He attended King's College London and holds a degree in Maths with Physics.

== Career ==
In 1974, John L. Walters was a founding member of the band Landscape, which evolved into a five-piece band with Richard James Burgess (drums, electric drums, computer programming, synths, vocals), Christopher Heaton (synthesizers, piano, vocals), Andy Pask (fretted and fretless basses, vocals), Peter Thoms (trombone, electric trombone, vocals), and Walters (lyricon, soprano sax, flute, alto flute, computer programming, synths, vocals). The band is known for the 1981 hit single ‘Einstein A Go-Go’, written by Walters and Burgess, which reached number 5 in the UK charts, ’Norman Bates’ (Walters) and the album From the Tea-rooms of Mars ....

After the band split, Walters went into record production. He subsequently produced and arranged records for Swans Way, Kissing the Pink, Twelfth Night, The Mike Gibbs Orchestra and pianist Mark Springer, and worked with other artists from the era including Kate Bush, for whom Walters and Burgess programmed Fairlight CMI on Never For Ever, Hot Gossip and Landscape colleague Richard James Burgess.

From 1987 to 1997, Walters was a member of the "electronic jazz orchestra" Zyklus, with Neil Ardley (his former composition teacher), guitarist/programmer Warren Greveson and Ian Carr.

In 1992, with Laurence Aston, he co-founded the audio journal Unknown Public, which won a Prudential Award in 1996. The first 12 Unknown Public (initially quarterly) releases came in the form of 'creative music in a plain brown box', including CD and detailed booklets including rich graphics. From UP13 (Changing Platforms) a CD-book format was used for more occasional releases. The last book issued was Re-Invented (UP17, 2006). Aston and Walters also founded the SoundCircus label with classical record producer James Mallinson and pianist Joanna MacGregor.

In 1997, after working for a number of newspapers and magazines, including the Architectural Review, he joined Eye magazine as managing editor. Walters has been the editor of Eye magazine since the publication of Eye no. 33 in 1999. He became its co-owner (with art director Simon Esterson) after a management buy-out in 2008. Walters also writes about creative music (including jazz, electronica, ‘world’ and contemporary music) for a number of newspapers and magazines including The Independent, in which he wrote a monthly music column called ‘Stretch Your Ears’ plus features, The Wire, Jazzwise, London Jazz News and The Guardian, for which he wrote the ‘On the Edge’ column for five years; also reviews and music features, some of which have been published on the Rock’s Backpages site.

Walters has been a guest lecturer at colleges and conferences internationally, and he served as an external examiner at Central Saint Martins from 2003 to 2006. Walters has also served as chair for several international juries, including one for the inaugural European Design Award and also the 24th International Biennial of Graphic Design. He has received many nominations for the UK's BSME (British Society of Magazine Editors) Awards, and won in 2002, 2016 and 2018. In January 2010, Walters was the co-curator of a one-day conference about music and design at St Bride Library, London, and he co-programmes the regular ‘Type Tuesday’ events that Eye has held at St Bride since 2013. In February 2020 he spoke at the Plan D Conference in Zagreb.

== Personal life ==
Walters is married to writer and journalist Clare Walters and has two daughters: circus artist and costume designer Jessie Rose, formerly a member of the hula hoop trio Hoop La La (semi-finalists, Britain’s Got Talent, 2008) and Rosie Walters.

== Articles and books ==
Walters has written hundreds of articles about music and graphic design and two books.

• 50 Typefaces That Changed The World (Octopus, 2013)

• Alan Kitching, A Life In Letterpress (Laurence King, 2016)
