= Richard James Burgess =

Richard James Burgess MBE
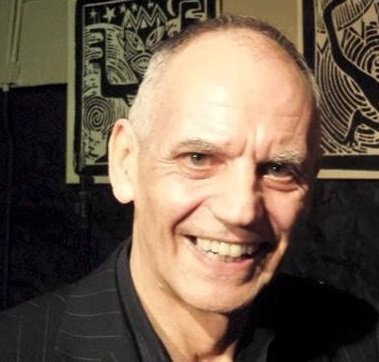
- Burgess in 2015

Background information
- Also known as: Caleb Kadesh; Cadillac Jack
- Born: 29 June 1949 (age 77); London, England
- Genres: Synth-pop; new wave
- Occupations: Musician; singer; songwriter; record producer; composer; author; manager; marketer; inventor; executive
- Instruments: Vocals; drums; synthesizer; programming
- Years active: 1971–present
- Labels: Event Horizon; RCA; Capitol
- Formerly of: Easy Street; Landscape
- Website: richardjamesburgess.com

Richard James Burgess MBE (born 29 June 1949) is an English musician, singer, songwriter, record producer, composer, author, manager, marketer and inventor.

Burgess's music career spans more than 50 years. He came to prominence in the early 1980s as co-founder and co-lead singer of the synthpop band Landscape, which released a top-5 hit in 1981 with the single "Einstein a Go-Go". Burgess is one of the main composers of Landscape's music, and made major musical and lyrical contributions to the band's songs. After the band's break-up he pursued a brief solo career releasing one mini-album, Richard James Burgess in 1984.

He launched his career as a producer with Spandau Ballet's debut UK hit "To Cut a Long Story Short", the first commercial success for the hitherto underground New Romantic movement.

Burgess currently serves as the president and CEO of A2IM: American Association of Independent Music.

== Early years ==
Richard James Burgess was born in London, England, and his family emigrated to Christchurch, New Zealand, in 1959. He showed an early interest in music, especially drums, and bought his first drumkit at the age of 14. As a drummer, he gained experience in local bands including Fred Henry, Orange, The Lordships and Barry Saunders.

Burgess also showed an early interest in recording production, buying a portable Tandberg tape recorder when he was 16 to make amateur recordings.

Burgess studied electronics at college before turning to studies in music. In 1972, he left New Zealand to study with Alan Dawson at the Berklee College of Music in Boston, and in 1973 moved back to London to study at the Guildhall School of Music and Drama. He holds a PhD in musicology from the University of Glamorgan (now the University of South Wales).

== Career ==
=== Musician and recording artist ===
In the mid-1970s, Burgess was a member of the soft rock band Easy Street, together with Ken Nicol and Peter Marsh. The trio released two albums, Easy Street (1976) and Under the Glass (1977) and several singles, one of which charted on the Billboard Hot 100 ("I've Been Lovin' You").

From 1975 through the early 1980s, Burgess co-produced, co-wrote, programmed, sang and played drums for the electronic band Landscape with Christopher Heaton, Andy Pask, Peter Thoms and John Walters. The band's RCA Records album From the Tea-rooms of Mars... To the Hell-holes of Uranus yielded the international hits "Einstein a Go-Go" and "Norman Bates". As a Capitol Records solo artist, he charted singles on the Billboard Hot Dance Club Play chart, reaching No. 1 on the New York Dance Music Report chart.

Burgess has played on many albums as a studio-drummer and percussionist, having worked with producers such as Tony Visconti, Peter Collins, Trevor Horn, Ian Levine, Robin Millar, Hugh Padgham, Mike Stone, Gary Langan, Barry Mason, Peter Dawkins, John Sinclair, Gary Lyons, and Junior Campbell. These include albums such as Adam Ant's Strip and The Buggles' The Age of Plastic. He also recorded jazz with the British National Youth Jazz Orchestra, Neil Ardley, Ian Carr and Nucleus, and the early Landscape recordings. He performed live with Graham Collier, OBE.

=== Producer ===
In the early 1980s, Burgess emerged as the first producer of the New Romantic movement, producing Spandau Ballet's first two gold albums and first seven charting singles. He won a Music Week magazine sales award as a producer, and has created 24 chart singles and 14 charting albums. Other productions included recordings for Living in a Box, Adam Ant, King, New Edition, Melba Moore, Colonel Abrams, America, Kim Wilde, Five Star, Tony Banks and Fish. He was also an ambient pioneer in producing the British group Praise. He produced, engineered and mixed albums by Rubicon and X-CNN under the pseudonym Caleb Kadesh and did several mixes using the pseudonym Cadillac Jack. He was co-producer, co-executive producer, project manager and an author for Jazz: The Smithsonian Anthology. He also produced The Smithsonian Anthology of Hip-Hop and Rap and is credited as associate producer on Tony Trischka's album Territory and as a compiler of Classic Piano Blues for Smithsonian Folkways Recordings.

Burgess's mixes and remixes include tracks for 9½ Weeks, About Last Night and artists Thomas Dolby, Lou Reed, Youssou N'Dour, and Luba.

=== Innovator ===
Burgess defined the computer programmer's and sampler's role in modern music via his work in the 1970s, creating the first computer driven hit, "Einstein a Go-Go", using the Roland MC-8 Microcomposer. He is believed to be the first to record digital samples on a commercial recording with his programming of the Fairlight CMI on Kate Bush's Never for Ever album and Visage's single "Fade to Grey". He conceptualised and co-designed the first standalone electronic drum set, the hexagonal shaped Simmons SDSV. He appeared on three separate occasions on the BBC Television programme Tomorrow's World demonstrating his prototype of the SDSV, the Roland MC-8 Microcomposer, and the Fairlight CMI. He is also reported to have coined the name "New Romantic" for the subcultural movement of the early 1980s, as well as the term "electronic dance music" (EDM), which first appeared on the record sleeve of the 1980 Landscape single "European Man". His New York City productions of Colonel Abrams' gold singles "Trapped" (1984) and "I'm Not Gonna Let You" (1985) are widely considered to have been the precursors to house music, with "Trapped" referred to as a proto-house track and a precursor to garage house.

=== Educator and academic ===
Burgess is a member of the academic advisory committee for The Association for the Study of the Art of Record Production (ASARP, London College of Music). He has lectured on the subject of record production and the music business in the United States and in the United Kingdom. He wrote and presented the BBC World Service radio series Let There Be Drums. He taught drums at the Annapolis Music School in Maryland, and has taught classes on record production and the music business at The Omega Studios' School of Applied Recording Arts And Sciences.

=== Author ===
Burgess's book The Art of Music Production: The Theory and Practice, which was in 1994 originally entitled The Art of Record Production, is now in its fourth edition. In 2014 he published his second book, The History of Music Production. He has written many chapters for other books and articles for technical and music magazines, as well as articles, papers and interviews for the academic Journal on the Association Art of Record Production (JARP), for which he is joint editor-in-chief.

=== Manager and executive ===
In 1978, Burgess founded a management company, Heisenberg Ltd, which managed producers and engineers such as Phill Brown, Andy Jackson, Adam Moseley, and Rafe McKenna in the UK and US. The company changed its name to Burgess World Co in the mid-1980s, and relocated to Maryland from Los Angeles and New York in the mid-1990s where it managed many mid-Atlantic based artists including Jimmie's Chicken Shack.

From 2001 to 2015, Burgess was employed at Smithsonian Folkways Recordings where he was the associate director of Business Strategies.

=== Boards ===
Burgess has been a member of the executive board of the Music Managers Forum U.S. was on the national steering committee for the Recording Academy's Producer and Engineer Wing and has served as co-chair of the executive committee for Smithsonian Music, a pan-institutional music initiative. He served as vice-president of the Washington, D.C. Chapter of the National Academy of Recording Arts and Sciences and co-chair for both the DC Chapter of the Producer and Engineer Wing, and the national Producer Compensation Committee. He was elected to the board of the American Association of Independent Music in 2013 and then to Chair of the board in 2015.

=== Non-profit work ===
Burgess is the current President and CEO of the American Association of Independent Music.

== Honours and awards ==
Burgess was appointed Member of the Order of the British Empire (MBE) in the 2022 New Year Honours for services to music.

In 2016 he received the British Council Education UK Alumni Award USA in the Professional Achievement category. As a member of the avant-garde electronic group Accord (with Christopher Heaton and Roger Cawkwell), he was featured on BBC Radio 3 programs Music in Our Time and Improvisation Workshop. With Landscape, he won the Greater London Arts Association's Young Jazz Musicians 1976 award and the Vitavox Live Sound award. Accord was also selected by the Arts Council of Great Britain for its Park Lane Group Purcell Room concert series. He was featured in The A to Z of Rock Drummers. In 2016, he won the British Council Education UK Alumni Award for Professional Achievement.
