= Samsung SGH-D807 =

Mobile phone manufactured by Samsung Electronics

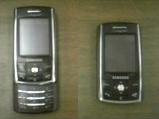
- Manufacturer: Samsung Electronics
- Availability by region: 2006
- Compatible networks: GSM 850/900/1800/1900, GPRS Class 10 (4+1/3+2 slots) 32 - 48 kbit/s, EDGE Class 10, 236.8 kbit/s
- Form factor: Slider
- Dimensions: 3.98" x 2.09" x 0.61" (101 x 53 x 15.5 mm)
- Weight: 3.3 oz (94 g)
- Memory: 17 MB, 4 MB for Java applications
- Removable storage: microSD, up to 2 GB known to work
- Battery: Talk time: Up to 5 hours; Stand-by: Up to 250 hours
- Rear camera: 1.3 megapixels Video: 3GP, 176x144 and 128x96 px
- Display: 176x220 pixels TFT LCD, 18-bit color
- Connectivity: USB; Bluetooth v1.2: Supported profiles: HSP, HFP, DUN, FTP, OPP
- Data inputs: numeric keypad, designated function keys

The Samsung SGH-D807 is a mobile phone manufactured by Samsung Electronics. It is the third model in the Samsung's mobile phone 'D' series

== Features and specifications ==
Still camera features:

- 1.3-megapixel
- Images stored as JPEG
- Toggle to video mode by pressing the "1" key
- Resolutions: 1280x1024, 1152x864, 800x600, 640x480, 320x240, and 176x144 ("2" key)
- Quality settings: Economy, Normal, Fine, and Super Fine ("3" key)
- Multi-shot options: 6, 9, or 15 Shots (Normal or High quality); 2x2 or 3x3 mosaic (Auto or Manual Control) ("4" key)
- Real-time photo effects (filters): grayscale, negative, sepia, emboss, sketch, antique, and moonlight ("5" key)
- Picture frame effect ("7" key)
- Self-timer: 3, 5 and 10 seconds ("8" key)
- Viewfinder: Standard Ratio or Full Screen ("*" key)
- Brightness can be adjusted (up/down on the directional pad)
- Digital zoom (up to 4x) can be adjusted (left/right on the directional pad)
- Vertical/Horizontal Flip (volume up/down keys)

Java (programming language):

- Microedition Platform: Java ME
- Microedition Configuration: CLDC 1.1
- Microedition Profile: MIDP 2.0

Headset:

- Samsung part number for the headset is AEP420SBE.

== Supported file formats ==
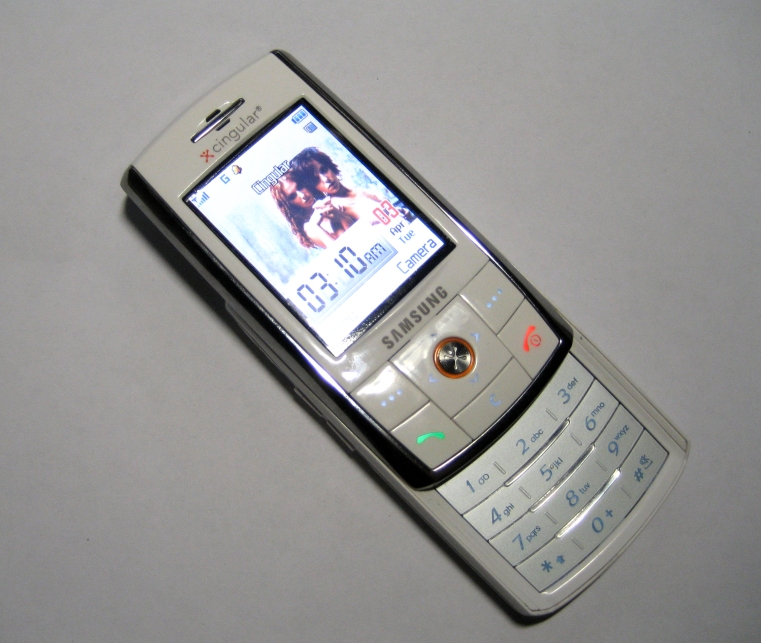
Samsung SGH-D807 with t.A.T.u. Wallpaper

- Images: JPEG, GIF, AGIF, WBMP, Bitmap (BMP), and PNG
  - Animated GIFs are not supported as wallpaper images.
- Video: 3GP (AMR Audio Only)
  - Neither photos nor videos can be viewed full screen, drastically cutting into the screen real estate.
- Audio: iMelody, SMAF, MIDI, SP-MIDI, MP3 (<=192kbit/s), Advanced Audio Coding (AAC)
  - These formats can be used as custom ring tones, but there is no option to customize other tones (e.g. text messaging, voicemail, etc.)
- All filenames (including the extension) must be 32 characters or less.
- File size limits:
  - Wallpaper: 100 KB
  - Ringtone: 600 KB

== Convenience features ==
- The phone's external keys can be set to lock when the user slides the phone shut.
- The voice dialing does not require setting up 'voice tags' for callers.
- Ringtone volume can be controlled with the side volume buttons and muted/unmuted by holding the # key.
