= Paul Sebastien =

American musician and marketing officer

- Born: Paul Sebastien Skrowaczewski
- Origin: Wayzata, Minnesota, U.S.
- Genres: Techno; ambient; electronic; jungle; video game music
- Occupations: Musician; producer; composer; marketing officer
- Years active: 1991–present
- Member of: Basic Pleasure Model
- Formerly of: Psykosonik; Power of Seven

Paul Sebastien, born Paul Sebastien Skrowaczewski, is an American musician, producer, composer, and technology executive. He is known for being a founding member, singer and co-writer of techno group Psykosonik. He also composed for many video game soundtracks and worked in-house at Thomas Dolby's company Beatnik, which acquired his music publishing company Power of Seven.

As a technology executive, he has held chief roles at both startups and large companies, spanning Chief Marketing Officer, General Manager, CEO and President roles. He is the son of the late Polish-American composer Stanisław Skrowaczewski.

== Early life ==
Sebastien graduated from the Blake School in Minneapolis.

== Music career ==
=== Psykosonik ===
Prior to forming Psykosonik, Sebastien was involved in a number of unsuccessful music projects. During the early 90s, Sebastien met Theodore Beale at The Underground in Minneapolis, which led to them starting a duo with Beale on keyboard and Sebastien on guitar and vocals. They were later joined by drummer Michael Larson and production engineer Daniel Lenz, the latter of which was also responsible for co-writing tracks with Sebastien. This led to the formation of Psykosonik, and they began recording electronic music at Sebastian's apartment where he had a recording studio, and later found performance opportunities in local clubs including First Avenue, 7th Street Entry, and Glam Slam.

The group released two albums in 1993 and 1995 respectively: Psykosonik and Unlearn. A remix of the track "Unlearn" by Josh Wink appeared on the soundtrack of the 1995 movie Mortal Kombat (although not featured in the movie itself), which became Platinum in less than a year reaching No. 10 on the Billboard 200, and was included in the 2011 Guinness World Records Gamer's Edition as the "most successful video game spin-off soundtrack album". He hangs the Platinum award in his music studio to this day. This led to them creating "It Has Begun" for the compilation album Mortal Kombat: More Kombat and "Panik Control" for the sequel Mortal Kombat Annihilation. Additionally, a selection of tracks by Psykosonik appeared in the American version of the game X-Kaliber 2097; these were resequenced for the Super Nintendo Entertainment System by Ali Lexa.

=== Other projects ===
In 1994, Sebastien started the music publishing company Power of Seven. He worked on a number of games under this name, including CyClones, and the title themes of Marathon 2: Durandal and Marathon Infinity, as well as the multimedia content product Hip Clip Music. The following year, Power of Seven was acquired by Thomas Dolby's audio technology company Beatnik (then known as Headspace), although the acquisition was not announced until 1996. This led to Sebastien becoming Headspace's production director, where he was responsible for content production, as well as composing for and managing the Headspace Music Library, and also worked on other multimedia projects. He highly enjoyed working with Dolby at Beatnik, as he was a large fan of his music during his teenage years and both shared common interests including the then-nascent Web, interactive media, windsurfing and other shared interests. As part of Headspace, he served as one of the composers for the game Obsidian.

Sebastien left the company in 1998 and went on to pursue new leadership roles at Silicon Valley startups including Enliven which was acquired by Excite.com in 1999. He also continued work on music and video games projects including Oni, along with fellow ex-Beatnik composer Brian Salter and sound designer Kim Cascone. Other music in the game was composed by Martin O'Donnell in collaboration with Michael Salvatori.

Although Sebastien became known for his work at Silicon Valley and Seattle companies as a technology executive, he continued writing music and eventually formed an electronica/new wave duo with Caesar Filori called Basic Pleasure Model in 2003. During the mid-2000s, they released three singles and also performed as an opening act for Thomas Dolby. The duo released further singles between 2019 and 2020. Sebastien has also released solo tracks, such as "The Turning of Summer" and "Midnight on Reef Island", and in 2022 he released the synthpop track "Summertime (I Don’t Care)".

== Business career ==
Following his time at Beatnik with Thomas Dolby, Sebastien pursued new business and marketing leadership roles at Silicon Valley companies (and eventually Seattle, as part of joining the early Xbox division of Microsoft in 2001). In 1999, following the acquisition of online advertising startup Enliven, he was recruited for a marketing leadership role at the startup Zaplet. Two years later, he joined Microsoft, working in multiple leadership roles. He also joined Zipper Interactive in 2005 as an executive who contributed to the success of the SOCOM U.S. Navy SEALs games franchise in partnership with Sony; the company was acquired by Sony in 2007. Subsequent companies he worked at include Disney Mobile (via acquisition of startup Tapulous), SugarSync, and T-Mobile (via acquisition of startup ChooChee).

He was then recruited in 2014 to build and lead a new B2B SaaS company for on Udemy, serving as General Manager and co-creator of Udemy for Business. Later, he joined Helpshift in 2017 as a chief marketing officer, followed by Offensive Security in 2019 as Chief Marketing Officer where he helped build and scale the company to global adoption across B2C and B2B. In 2022, he left Offensive Security to join Raoul Pal at finance education platform and media company Real Vision, as its President.

Sebastien has developed an interest in cryptocurrency and Web3. This started in 2013 with bitcoin mining, and in 2017 his friend Mauvis Ledford introduced him to a network of crypto experts.

== Personal life ==
Sebastien lives with his wife Julia Sebastien, and they have three children. His father is composer Stanisław Skrowaczewski, who died in 2017.

== Discography ==
=== With Psykosonik ===
- Psykosonik (1993)
- Unlearn (1995)

=== With Headspace ===
- Headspace Music Library V4: Midnight Soundscape (1999) – "Schizo-Trance"
- Headspace Music Library V6: Backyard Sunset (1999) – with Brian Salter, Thomas Dolby and Kim Cascone
- Headspace Music Library V8: Dreamflight (1999) – with Kim Cascone
- Headspace Music Library V9: Dreamflight 2 (1999) – with Blake Leyh and Kim Cascone
- Headspace Music Library V14: Seethroo (2000) – with Brian Salter
- Headspace Music Library V18: Backwaters (2000) – with Brian Salter

=== With Basic Pleasure Model ===
- Sunyata (2003)
- How To Live (2004)
- Outside (2019)
- Where Do We Go from Here (2020)
- Surrender (2020)
- Ephemeral (2020)

=== Solo works ===
- "Midnight on Reef Island" (2020)
- "The Turning of Summer" (2021)
- "Summertime (I Don't Care)" (2022)

== Video games ==
Year	Title	Notes
1994	CyClones	composer and sound effects; with Theodore Beale and Kevin Schilder
1995	Marathon 2: Durandal	title theme composer
1996	Marathon Infinity	title theme composer
1996	Tracer	composer
1997	Nebula Fighter	composer
2001	Oni	composer; with Martin O'Donnell, Michael Salvatori, and Brian Salter
2003	NHL Rivals 2004	sound director
2003	NHL Fever 2004	sound director
2005	SOCOM 3 U.S. Navy SEALs	producer; with Prem Krishnan
2005	SOCOM U.S. Navy SEALs: Fireteam Bravo	crosstalk producer; with Prem Krishnan
2006	SOCOM U.S. Navy SEALs: Combined Assault	additional producer; with Tony Iuppa and Cade Myers
