= RTX =

RTX may refer to:

== Biology and medicine ==
- Radiation therapy, is therapy using ionizing radiation, generally as part of cancer treatment to control or kill malignant cells
- Resiniferatoxin, a natural, high-potency ligand that activates the capsaicin (VR1, TRPV1) receptor
- Rituximab, a monoclonal antibody used in the treatment of leukemia, lymphomas, transplant rejection and autoimmune disorders
- RTX toxin (repeats in toxin), a type of toxin secreted by Gram-negative bacteria

== Computing and arts ==
- RTX2010, a radiation-hardened microprocessor which has been used in numerous spacecraft
- RTX (operating system), a real-time operating system extension for Microsoft Windows
- Keil RTX, a real-time operating system (RTOS) produced by Keil for ARM devices
- Ray tracing (graphics), as implemented by Nvidia, is known as RTX, whereas AMD's implementation differs from RTX, though it's not unusual for people to refer to it as such
  - Nvidia RTX, a series of Nvidia graphic cards in the GeForce brand
- .rtx (ring tone XML file extension), of the Ring Tone Transfer Language
- RTX (event), a video game and internet convention held annually in three cities
- RTX Red Rock, a 2003 action-adventure game for the PlayStation 2, which was developed and published by LucasArts
- RTX, a band formed by Jennifer Herrema

== Other uses ==
- RTX Corporation, formerly Raytheon Technologies, an American defense industry company

== See also ==
- GTX (disambiguation)
