= Beatnik (company) =

Internet audio company

- Web logo in 2000
- Type: Private
- Industry: Audio technology
- Founded: 1993; 33 years ago in California, United States
- Founders: Thomas Dolby; Mary Coller
- Defunct: December 2011; 14 years ago
- Fate: Dissolved
- Headquarters: 60 E 3rd Ave, San Mateo, California, United States
- Area served: Worldwide
- Key people: Don Millers
- Products: Beatnik
- Website: beatnik.com (defunct)

Beatnik, Inc., founded as Headspace, Inc., was a company that specialized in interactive audio technology. It was founded by musician Thomas Dolby in 1993 along with co-founder Mary Coller. It is best known for its Beatnik technology, which was used to provide sound in small file sizes on websites and later in billions of phones during the 2000s to play polyphonic ringtones, with its key clients being Nokia, Sony Ericsson, Samsung, and various other manufacturers. During its earlier years it also produced music for video games such as Cyberia and Obsidian.

== History ==
=== 1993–1996: Early years ===
In 1993, Thomas Dolby co-founded the company with Mary Coller, as he was frustrated that there was a lack of tools available to develop interactive audio. Prior to this, Dolby had created an exhibition at Guggenheim Museum, New York named the Virtual String Quartet, which was programmed by Eric Gullichsen. The experience ran on an IBM 386 processor with a Convolvatron 4-channel audio card. Users wore a head-mounted display and found themselves in the midst of a computer-generated string quartet playing Mozart, which could be selected to play in different styles. The company worked on music and sound effects for games, including Double Switch, Cyberia, and The Dark Eye.

=== 1996–2001: Incorporation and internet audio ===
Headspace was incorporated on May 1, 1996. One of the company's first clients following incorporation was WebTV, which led to Headspace creating music and sound effects for its devices, as well as bundling additional music collections from the Headspace Music Library. With this format being a software solution, Dolby considered this to be saving physical space within the devices, while satisfying the needs of television viewers wanting audio to accompany the internet.

Later in 1996, Headspace announced its acquisition of music publishing company Power of Seven, founded by Psykosonik frontman Paul Sebastien. This led to him assuming the role of Director of Production, while Power of Seven's music libraries were integrated with Headspace's own. In addition to Dolby and Sebastien, Headspace also employed other composers including Brian Salter, Blake Leyh, and Kim Cascone. The composers created music and sound effects in a wide variety of genres for the Headspace Music Library, a series of music and sound effect collections that could be purchased online by web developers looking to sonify their websites. All of these composers except Salter composed for the game Obsidian released in 1997, working closely with the developer Rocket Science Games and attending meetings from the beginning of its development, although the work was done at their own offices.

The company also announced its acquisition of Igor Software Laboratories in 1997, whose founders Steve Hales and Jim Nitchals developed the SoundMusicSys sound engine used in several Mac games as well as WebTV, which both Headspace and Igor had previously worked on together. This led to the sound engine being reworked into the Headspace Audio Engine, as well as developing the Rich Music Format (RMF), primarily utilized to play audio over the internet at small file sizes while allowing for the use of custom instrument samples.

In 1997, Sun Microsystems licensed the Headspace Audio Engine for use in its Java virtual machines. The same year, Headspace released the Beatnik software system, consisting of the Beatnik Plug-In and the Beatnik Editor. The plug-in could be installed to allow for RMF playback, while the editor could be utilized to author RMF files. Companies that utilized the technology on their websites included Yahoo! and 7 Up, both of which featured sonic branding jingles played with the engine. David Bowie's website in 1999 also featured an RMF version of his song "Fame", where users could select what layers of the track they wanted to hear.

In 1999, Lorraine Hariton was hired as the president and chief executive of Headspace, although Dolby remained the company's chief. Shortly after Hariton's appointment, the company was renamed to Beatnik, Inc., as the company had now become solely focused on delivering interactive audio using the Beatnik technology. During 1999 the company also acquired the company Mixman. The Headspace Music Library was also converted into CD format and released on several compilation CDs by FirstCom Music.

Beatnik filed for an initial public offering in 2000, after losing $10.5 million in 1999.

=== 2001–2011: Mobile technology ===
As a result of the dot-com bubble and declining interest in web audio, Beatnik largely shifted its focus towards mobile technology by 2001, as mobile manufacturers such as Nokia were looking to ship polyphonic ringtones on their phones without having to use sound chips, which were increasingly utilized on phones in East Asia at the time. After Beatnik met with Nokia, the Beatnik Audio Engine was reworked into miniBAE, an optimized version designed for portable devices. In addition to Nokia, the engine was licensed to other manufacturers such as Danger and Sony Ericsson, including for the T-Mobile Sidekick and Sony Ericsson P800. Most notably, the engine was used on most Nokia phones of the time to play the polyphonic version of the Nokia tune arranged by Ian Livingstone (often falsely attributed as being Dolby's own work), who created several other polyphonic arrangements of Nokia's monophonic ringtones. The first phone to ship with the engine was the Nokia 3510, released in 2002.

Beatnik built a team of composers to write polyphonic ringtones for Nokia, while Nokia's own sound manager Jarkko Ylikoski also built a sound team based in Finland. While Beatnik had recommended that Nokia utilized the RMF format to give ringtones a richer, more realistic sound, Nokia only intended to support standard file formats and had planned to remove the code to make RMFs playable, but ultimately overlooked this on their Symbian phones. As a result, the sound quality was considered tinny, and Dolby and his team were privately embarrassed about it; he feared that people would blame him for the "global ringtone plague". Dolby stepped down from his CEO position in 2002, feeling that most of the ringtones being sold were "cheesy-sounding" and that Beatnik's business was no longer interesting to him. Don Millers replaced him as the CEO although he remained on the company's board. Later in 2002 he formed a company named Retro Ringtones with software developer Till Toenschoff, which offered ringtones in bulk to businesses, in both MIDI and RMF formats. After the company ended business in 2005, he returned to pursuing his music career.

Brian Salter, who had left Beatnik in 1998 but continued to have a close working relationship with the company and its clients, converted several Headspace Music Library tracks into the SMAF format in 2001, to be used as polyphonic ringtones within Japan, where phones largely used Yamaha's MA series of sound chips rather than Beatnik's software-based miniBAE. He also created sound banks used on phones with miniBAE, aiming for a high-quality output within limited technical specifications, as well as composing original ringtones for Nokia.

In 2002, Beatnik launched a rewritten version of BAE named mobileBAE. This uses the more standard Extensible Music Format (XMF), as opposed to the proprietary RMF format used in earlier versions. By 2005, the company reported that BAE had been shipped in over 250 million phones.

Throughout the 2000s, polyphonic ringtones gradually lost popularity in favor of truetone ringtones in streamed formats, as a result of phones having increased memory. Beatnik ended business in December 2009, and dissolved in November 2011. Steve Hales, who co-developed the Beatnik Audio Engine following the acquisition of his company Igor's Software Laboratories, opensourced miniBAE in 2010, with permission from the company. It was initially released on Google Project Hosting and moved to GitHub in 2011.

== See also ==
- Nokia tune
- Synthetic music mobile application format
