= Professional Music Driver =

Music driver and MML composition system for NEC PC-9801 computers

- Developer: Masahiro Kajihara (KAJA)
- Initial release: Late 1980s
- Platform: NEC PC-9801
- Type: Music driver, Music Macro Language compiler

Professional Music Driver (PMD) is a music driver and Music Macro Language (MML) composition system developed for the NEC PC-9801 series of Japanese personal computers. It was created by Japanese programmer and composer Masahiro Kajihara, known by the handle KAJA, during the late 1980s.

PMD allows music to be written using a textual notation based on MML and compiled into compact data playable on PC-98 sound hardware.

It became one of the most widely used music driver systems in the PC-98 ecosystem and was widely used in Japanese computer games during the late 1980s and early 1990s.

== Overview ==
Professional Music Driver consists of an MML compiler and a playback driver. Composers write music using a text-based macro language, which is compiled into binary music data that can be embedded in software and executed by the driver.

The system was designed primarily for the Yamaha YM2608 (OPNA) sound chip, which was widely used in PC-98 sound boards. PMD can control multiple FM synthesis channels and also supports ADPCM sample playback depending on hardware configuration.

Because the compiled music data is compact and efficient, PMD was particularly suitable for computer games and other applications where memory capacity was limited.

== Features ==
Typical features of Professional Music Driver include:

- Composition using Music Macro Language
- Support for the Yamaha YM2608 FM synthesis chip
- Multi-channel music playback
- Macro definitions and reusable musical patterns
- Instrument parameter control
- Tempo and timing commands
- ADPCM sample playback
- FM channel 3 expansion through the #FM3Extend command
- SSGPCM sample playback through the K/R rhythm channels
- Compact compiled music data suitable for software distribution

== Development ==
PMD was created by Masahiro Kajihara (KAJA), who was active in the Japanese PC-98 programming and music community during the late 1980s. At that time, software developers increasingly relied on music drivers to control FM synthesis sound hardware available for Japanese personal computers.

Text-based music systems such as PMD enabled composers to create complex music using only textual notation without requiring external MIDI equipment.

== Use in PC-98 software ==
Masahiro Kajihara (KAJA) also used PMD in his own music-related work, including credited PMD dataling on the 1995 Princess Maker 2 arrangement CD.

Variants of PMD were used in early PC-9801 entries of the Touhou Project series developed by ZUN.

Composer Ryu Umemoto is also documented in connection with PMD-related work.

== Relationship to other music drivers ==
Professional Music Driver was one of several widely used music drivers developed for the PC-98 platform. Other notable systems include:

- MUCOM88
- FMP

Together these systems formed the basis of music production for many PC-98 games before MIDI-based composition tools became widespread.

== See also ==
- Music Macro Language
- MUCOM88
- YM2203
- YM2608
- NEC PC-9801
