= IMY =

IMY or imy may refer to:

- imy, ISO 639-3 code for Milyan language
- .imy, file extension for IMelody ringtones
- IMY, abbreviation for Integritetsskyddsmyndigheten, Swedish name for the Swedish Authority for Privacy Protection
