= Stanisław Skrowaczewski =

Polish composer and conductor (1923–2017)

Stanislaw Skrowaczewski
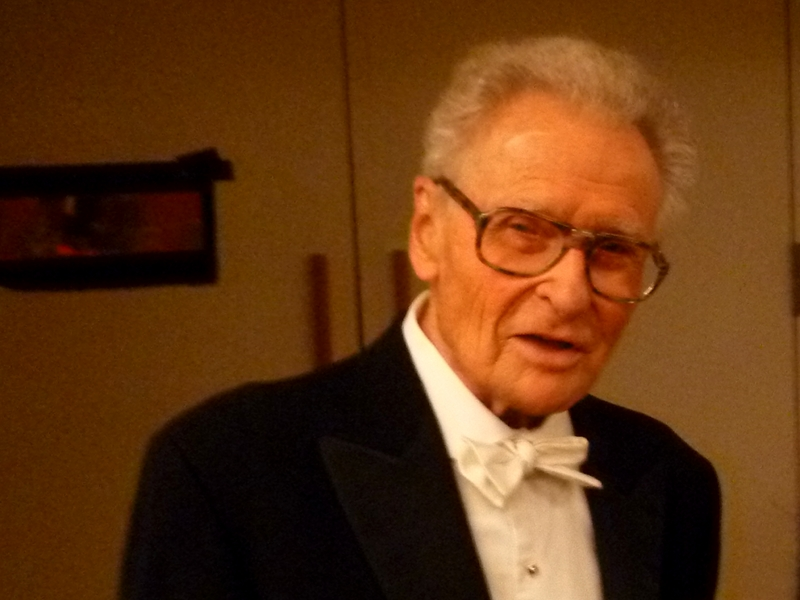
- Skrowaczewski in Tokyo (October 2011)
- Pronunciation: staˌɲiswaf skrɔvaˈt͡ʂɛfskʲi
- Born: Stanislaw Pawel Stefan Jan Sebastian Skrowaczewski; October 3, 1923; Lwów, Second Polish Republic
- Died: February 21, 2017 (aged 93); St. Louis Park, Minnesota
- Education: Academy of Music in Kraków

Stanislaw Pawel Stefan Jan Sebastian Skrowaczewski (Polish: [staˌɲiswaf skrɔvaˈt͡ʂɛfskʲi]; October 3, 1923 – February 21, 2017) was a Polish-American classical conductor and composer.

== Biography ==
Skrowaczewski was born in Lwów, Second Polish Republic (now Lviv, Ukraine). His parents were Paweł and Zofia (Karszniewicz) Skrowaczewski. His mother, an amateur pianist, began giving him lessons at the age of four, and he composed his first symphony by age eight. The Lwów Philharmonic performed one of his symphonies that same year. He gave his first piano recital at age eleven, and then, at age thirteen, he conducted and was the soloist in Beethoven's Piano Concerto No. 3 in C minor. He gave up any thought of pursuing a career as a soloist when, after a German bombing raid in June 1941, he suffered two broken hands and was also left with nerve damage.

During the German occupation, Skrowaczewski worked as a bricklayer, and he studied physics, chemistry and philosophy at the University of Lwów. He then pursued training at the Lwów Conservatory, and then the Academy of Music in Kraków (in the composition class of Roman Palester and conducting class of Walerian Bierdiajew). He became the principal conductor of the Wrocław Philharmonic (1946–1947), then the Katowice Philharmonic (1949–1954), the Kraków Philharmonic (1954–1956), and finally the Warsaw National Orchestra (1956–1959). He studied composition with Nadia Boulanger and conducting with Paul Kletzki in Paris. He co-founded the avant-garde Groupe Zodiaque with Maurice Ohana. In 1956 he won the Santa Cecilia Competition for Conductors.

While the Cleveland Orchestra was giving a concert in Warsaw in 1957, their music director, George Szell, invited Skrowaczewski to make his American debut the following year. He guest-conducted in Cleveland again in 1959, where he gave the US debut of his "Symphony for Strings", and then, in 1960, for Pittsburgh, Cincinnati, and the New York Philharmonic.

He and his wife defected from Poland to the United States in 1960, via Amsterdam, after he was offered the post of music director of the Minneapolis Symphony Orchestra (later renamed the Minnesota Orchestra under his tenure in 1968), a position he held until 1979 when he became conductor laureate. In 1981 the American Composers Forum (then known as the Minnesota Composers Forum) commissioned the Clarinet Concerto which Skrowaczewski wrote for Minnesota Orchestra principal clarinetist Joe Longo, who premiered it in 1981. While in Minnesota, Skrowaczewski lobbied to have Orchestra Hall built, and he also introduced American audiences to the works of many Polish composers, including those of Penderecki, Szymanowski, and Lutosławski.

Between 1983 and 1992 he was principal conductor of the Hallé Orchestra in Manchester.

Between 1995 and 1997, Skrowaczewski served as artistic advisor to the Milwaukee Symphony Orchestra. In 1988, he was composer-in-residence for the Philadelphia Orchestra's summer season at Saratoga. He has guest-conducted that orchestra, and many others, all over the world. In 2007, he became principal conductor of the Yomiuri Nippon Symphony Orchestra in Tokyo, and also made several recordings with the NHK Symphony Orchestra.

His complete set of recordings of the symphonies of Anton Bruckner, made with the Deutsche Radio Philharmonie Saarbrücken Kaiserslautern, has received much acclaim, as has his 2005/06 complete Beethoven symphony cycle with the orchestra. Another noted recording is his Brahms Piano Concerto No. 2 with the London Symphony Orchestra in collaboration with soloist Gina Bachauer.

Skrowaczewski's Passacaglia Immaginaria, completed in 1995, was nominated for the Pulitzer Prize in 1997. Commissioned by the Minnesota Orchestral Association to honor the memory of Ken and Judy Dayton, it was premiered at Orchestra Hall in Minneapolis in 1996.

His Chamber Concerto was commissioned by the St. Paul Chamber Orchestra in memory of Leopold Sipe, their first music director. Skrowaczewski received his second Pulitzer nomination in 1999 for his Concerto for Orchestra.

He received the Commander Order of the White Eagle, the highest order conferred by the Polish government, as well as the Gold Medal of the Mahler-Bruckner Society, the 1973 Ditson Conductor's Award, and the Kennedy Center Friedheim Award's third prize in 1978 for his Ricercari Notturni for saxophone and orchestra.

He was the father of Paul Sebastien, founder of electronica groups Psykosonik and Basic Pleasure Model, and of Nicholas Skrowaczewski. He lived in Wayzata, Minnesota, and died in St. Louis Park on February 21, 2017.

Frederick Harris, Jr., director of the MIT Wind Ensemble, wrote Skrowaczewski's official biography.

== Recordings ==
- Passacaglia Immaginaria/ Chamber Concerto/ Concerto for Clarinet in A & Orchestra – Saarbrücken Radio Symphony Orchestra; Albany TROY481 (2001); conducted by the composer OCLC 610905023
- Robert Schumann cello concerto in A minor/ Édouard Lalo cello concerto in D minor, Janos Starker, cello, London Symphony Orchestra, conducted by S. Skrowaczewski (1963 Philips A 04910 L) OCLC 254635954

== Notes ==
Cultural offices
Preceded by Gerd Albrecht	Principal Conductor, Yomiuri Nippon Symphony Orchestra; April 2007 – March 2010	Succeeded by Sylvain Cambreling
