= SCKL =

SCKL is a type of format used when sending image and ringtone data through Short Message Service (SMS) messages; most mobile phones can interpret this type of data, for some it will show the data as a text message. It was developed by Nokia. Not all networks, for example CDMA, IDEN, and TDMA networks, can directly pass binary data to mobile phones. Ringtones and graphics contain binary data and Nokia's SCKL encoding provides a method of delivering binary data to a phone using only printable characters. Thus, it allows ringtones and graphics to be delivered over CDMA, IDEN, and TDMA networks. It also requires a phone that can correctly interpret the SCKL format and most Nokia phones can do this, as well as some phones from other manufacturers and many WAP compatible phones.

== Message format ==
SCKL message consists of a header, then a space, and lastly user data. The description that follows is somewhat simplified to give all the essentials without giving all the options. Below is an SCKL format message to send a ringtone:

//SCKL1581 024A3A650995D1D195C93D999804144288F511610611624D30831445

Each SCKL message must contain 160 characters or less since this is the maximum number of characters that can be sent in one SMS message. The letters must be in upper case for some phones.
