= Mobile17 =

Massachusetts-based website

Mobile17 was a Boston, Massachusetts-based website that allowed users to create custom ringtones for a wide variety of mobile devices.

== History ==
The service originated as a popular website called smashTheTONES which soon evolved into Mobile17.com. This Boston-based mobile startup creates ringtones available to every mobile phone user in the United States via an online toolset and applications for the iPhone and Android-operated devices. Among the first to provide custom ringtones online, Mobile17 rose to prominence after mentions on Tech TV’s The Screen Savers, CNet, Life Hacker, Men’s Health Magazine and Popular Science.

In 2006, Popular Science called Mobile17 “the easiest way” to create ringtones online.
