= Ringtone =

Sound made by a telephone to indicate an incoming call or text message

Ringing noise from an electromechanical telephone

Example of a short digital tune which could be used as a ringtone on a mobile phone

A ringtone is the sound made by a telephone to indicate an incoming telephone call. Originally referring to the sound of electromechanical striking of bells or gongs, the term refers to any sound by any device alerting of an incoming call.

On plain old telephone services (POTS), starting in the late 19th century, the signal is created by superimposing ringing voltage on the direct current line voltage. Electronic telephones could produce a warbling, chirping, or other sounds. Variations of the cadence or tone of the ring signal, called distinctive ringing, can be used to indicate characteristics of incoming calls.

Modern telephones, especially smartphones, are manufactured with a preloaded selection of ringtones. Customers can buy or generate custom ringtones for installation on the device as a default ringtone or a distinctive ringtone used to indicate characteristics of incoming calls. Digital ringtones were a large market in the 2000s, at its peak generating up to $4 billion in worldwide sales in 2004, but the market declined steeply by the end of the decade.

== Background and history ==
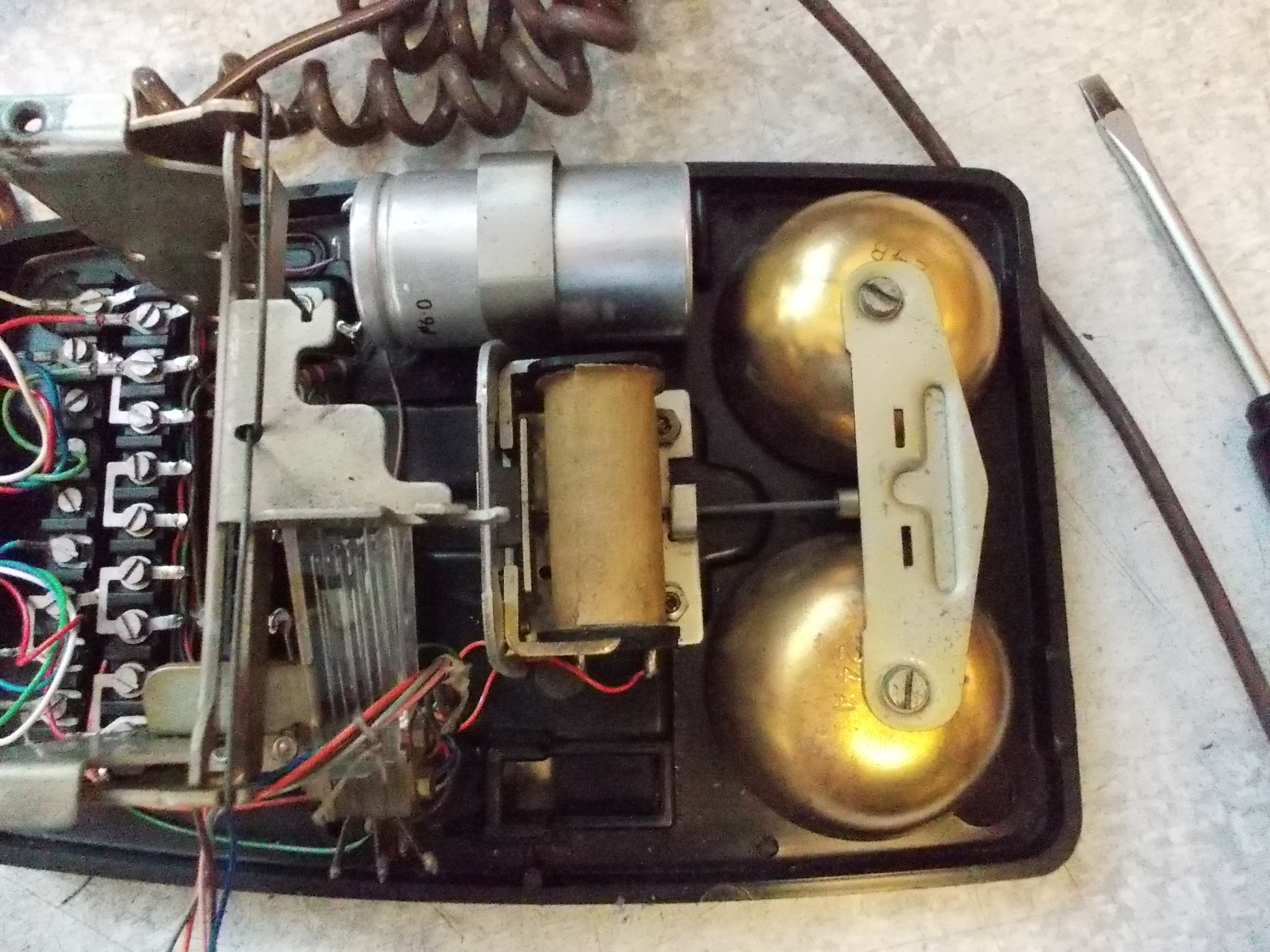
Electromechanical ringer in a 20th century landline telephone

A telephone rings when the telephone network indicates an incoming call, so that the recipient is alerted of the call attempt. Landline telephones typically receive an electric alternating current signal, called power ringing or ringing signal, generated by the telephone exchange to which the telephone is connected. The ringing current originally operated an electric bell. For mobile phones, the network sends a message to the recipient's device, which may activate a sound, or a visual or vibrating indication.

On a POTS interface, this signal is created by superimposing ringing voltage atop the −48 VDC already on the line. This is done at the Central Office, or a neighborhood multiplexer called an "SLC" for Subscriber Line Carrier. (SLC is a trademark of Alcatel-Lucent, but is often used generically.) Telephones with electromagnetic ringers are still in widespread use. The ringing signal in North America is normally specified at ca. 90 volts AC with a frequency of 20 hertz. In Europe it is around 60–90 VAC with a frequency of 25 Hz. Some non-Bell Company system party lines in the US used multiple frequencies for selective ringing. Ringing voltage is produced by various sources. Large central offices used motor-driven generator sets for both ringing and other signals such as dial tone and busy signals. In smaller offices, special sub-cycle magnetic oscillators were used. Typically, solid-state oscillators have replaced them. Originally this voltage was used to trigger an electromagnet to ring a bell installed inside the telephone, or in a nearby mounted ringer box.

Fixed phones of the late 20th century and later detect this ringing current voltage and trigger a warbling tone electronically. Mobile phones have been fully digital since the early 1990s second-generation ("2G") devices, hence are signaled to ring as part of the protocol they use to communicate with the cell base stations.

While the sound produced is still called a "ring", some phones electronically produce a warbling, chirping, or other sound. Variation of the ring signal can be used to indicate characteristics of incoming calls. For example, ringing bursts with a shorter interval between them might be used to signal a call from a given number.

In POTS switching systems, ringing is said to be "tripped" when the impedance of the entire telephone line (local loop) is reduced when the telephone handset is lifted off the hook. This signals that the telephone call has been answered. The telephone exchange immediately removes the ringing signal from the line and connects the call.

The ringing pattern is known as ring cadence, in which the high voltage ring current is switched on and off to create the pattern. In North America, the standard ring cadence is two seconds of ringing followed by four seconds of silence. In Australia and the UK, the standard ring cadence is 400 ms on, 200 ms off, 400 ms on, 2000 ms off. These patterns may vary from region to region, and other patterns are used in different countries around the world. Some central offices offer distinctive ring to identify one of multiple telephone numbers assigned to the same line, a pattern once widely used on party line (telephony).

In many systems, including North America Bellcore standards, Caller ID signals are sent during the silent interval between the first and second bursts of the ringing signals.

The caller is informed about the progress of the call by the ringback tone. The ringing signal and ringback tone are not always synchronized.

Seven different gong combinations for the "C" type ringer were included in the model 500 and 2500 landline telephone sets. These gongs provided "distinctive tones" for hearing-impaired customers and also made it possible to distinguish the specific telephone that was ringing when several telephones were placed in close proximity. A "Bell Chime" was also offered, which could be set to sound like a doorbell or to ring like a standard telephone.

While rings, ringers, ring signals, or what might be viewed as the call signals which are the predecessors of ringtones, date back to the beginnings of telephony, modern ringtones appeared in the 1960s and have expanded into tunes and many customizable tones or melodies. Arguably the first ringtone (in the modern sense) appeared in the movie Our Man Flint in 1966, where the head of the secret government agency had a red phone that connected directly to the President and rang with a distinctive musical ringtone.

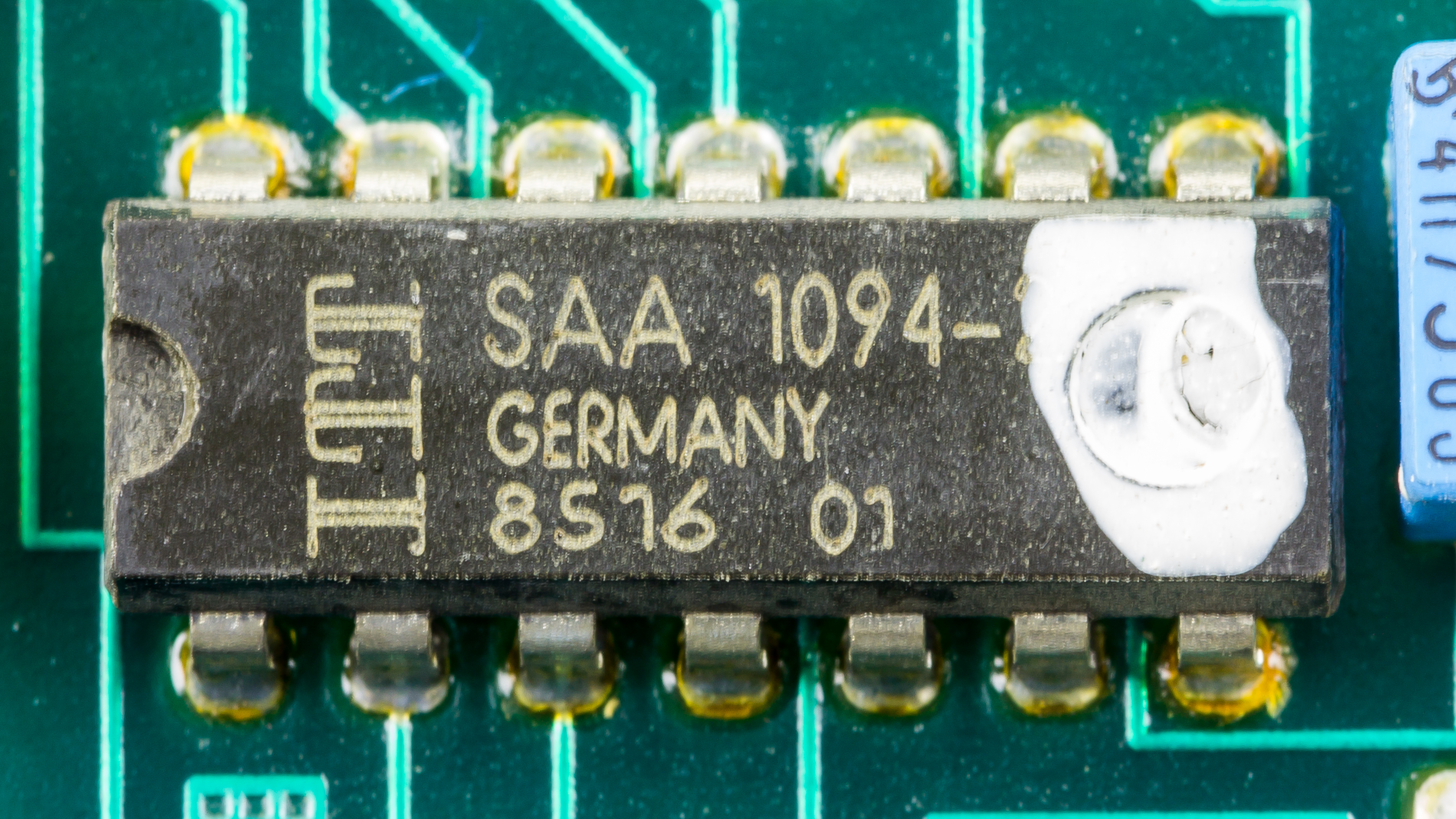
A tone ringer IC: ITT SAA 1094

Following a 1975 FCC ruling which permitted third-party devices to be connected to phone lines, manufacturers produced accessory telephone ringers which rang with electronic tones or melodies rather than mechanical bells. People also made their own ringers which used the chip from a musical greeting card to play a melody on the arrival of a call. One such ringer, described in a 1989 book, even features a toy dog which barks and wags its tail when a call arrives. Eventually, electronic telephone ringers became the norm. Some of these ringers produced a single tone, but others produced a sequence of two or three tones or a musical melody. Some novelty phones have a ringer to match, such as a duck that quacks or a car that honks its horn.

Polyphonic ringtone technology dates back to 1999, when the Yamaha MA-1 sound chip was introduced, including four 2-op FM synthesis channels. Ringtones played on the MA series chips are in the MIDI-based synthetic music mobile application format (SMAF). It was succeeded by the MA-2 in 2000, which includes 16 channels with support for ADPCM samples, and the MA-3 in 2001 which includes 32 FM channels and 8 wavetable channels. One of the first software-based polyphonic synths included on phones was miniBAE, developed by Thomas Dolby's audio technology company Beatnik. It is an optimized version of Beatnik Audio Engine, which was previously used in products such as WebTV. The first phone to include this synth was the Nokia 3510, released in 2002.

== Types ==
- Monophonic: The original ringtones play only one note at a time.
- Polyphonic: A polyphonic ringtone can consist of several notes at a time. The first polyphonic ring tones used sequenced recording methods such as MIDI. Such recordings specify what synthetic instrument should play a note at a given time, and the actual instrument sound is dependent upon the playback device. Later, synthesized instruments could be included along with the composition data, which allowed for more varied sounds beyond the built-in sound bank of each phone.
- Truetone: A truetone, also known as realtone, superphonic ringtone, is an audio recording, typically in a common format such as MP3 or AAC. Truetones, which are often excerpts from songs, became popular as ringtones. The first truetone service was started by au in December 2002. "My Gift to You" by Chemistry was the first song to be distributed as a truetone. This truetone (in Japanese chaku-uta) was released in time for Chemistry's concert tour in Japan.
- Sing tone: A sing tone is a ringtone created in karaoke style, combining a user's recorded voice with a backing track.

== Encoding formats ==
Most modern phones support ringtones in MP3 format, and other common audio formats such as AAC, Ogg Vorbis, FLAC, and MIDI are often supported as well. Less common formats include:

- 3GP: A multimedia container format that can be used for video ringtones.
- AMR: Audio compression format specialized in speech used by Nokia before mp3 became standard.
- eMelody: Older monophonic Ericsson format.
- iMelody: Monophonic format developed by Ericsson to replace eMelody.
- KWS: Kyocera's ringer format.
- MOT: An older ringer format for Motorola phones.
- Music Macro Language (MML), originally used in early computer and video games, later used in BASIC implementations and ringtones
- .nrt / .rng / .rt / .ext: Nokia's monophonic format.
- Nokia / SCKL / OTT: Nokia Smart Messaging format. Allows users to share ringtones via text message.
- PDB: Palm database. This is the format used to load ringtones on PDA phones such as the Kyocera 6035 and the Handspring Treo.
- PMD: Format co-created by Qualcomm and Japanese company Faith which can include MIDI, sampled (PCM) audio, static graphics, animation, text, vibration and LED events.
- QCP: File format generated by Qualcomm PureVoice software. Especially well-suited for simple vocal recordings.
- RMF: a polyphonic format with embedded audio used on Symbian and Danger Hiptop devices.
- RTTTL/RTX: Nokia-developed text formats for Smart Messaging.
- Samsung: Proprietary key press format.
- Siemens: Can create and read in a Siemens text file format.
- Siemens SEO: Siemens SEO binary format.
- SMAF: Yamaha music format that combines MIDI with instrument sound data (aka Module files). Filenames have the extension "MMF" or "MLD".
- SRT: Sipura ringtone for Sipura Technology VoIP phones.
- Mobile XMF: Many of Nokia's 2004-2013 phones support this format.

== Generation software ==
A ringtone maker is an application that converts a user chosen song or other audio file for use as a ringtone of a mobile phone. The ringtone file is installed in the mobile phone either by direct cable connection, Bluetooth, text messaging, or e-mail. On many websites, users may create ringtones from digital music or audio.

The earliest ringtone maker was Harmonium, developed by Vesa-Matti Paananen, a Finnish computer programmer, and released in 1997 for use with Nokia smart messaging. Some phone manufacturers included features for users to create music tones, either with a "melody composer" or a sample/loop arranger, such as the MusicDJ software included on many Sony Ericsson phones. These often use encoding formats only available to one particular phone model or brand. Other formats, such as MIDI or MP3, are often supported; they must be downloaded to the phone before they can be used as a normal ringtone.

In 2005, "SmashTheTones", now "Mobile17", became the first third-party solution for ringtone creation online without requiring downloadable software or a digital audio editor. Later, iPhones included the ability to create a ringtone from a song purchased with the iTunes library.

== Commercial sales and popularity ==
In September 1996, IDO sold Digital Minimo D319 by Denso. It was the first mobile phone where a user could input an original melody, rather than having to use preloaded melodies. These phones proved to be popular in Japan, with a book being published in 1998 providing details about how to customize phones to play snippets of popular songs, selling more than 3.5 million copies.

The first downloadable mobile ringtone service was created and delivered in Finland in 1998 when Radiolinja (a Finnish mobile operator now known as Elisa) started their service called Harmonium, invented by Vesa-Matti Pananen. Harmonium contained both tools for individuals to create monophonic ring tones and a mechanism to deliver them over-the-air (OTA) via SMS to a mobile handset. In November 1998, Digitalphone Groupe (SoftBank Mobile) started a similar service in Japan.

Andy Clarke, while working for UK phone provider Orange, helped created the B5 Ringtone License with the UK's Mechanical-Copyright Protection Society in 1998. In 1999, Clarke registered ringtone.net and setup what is believed to be the world's first "legal" ringtone business. Scott Memphis, leader singer of Sunday Morning Sanctuary, wrote a 2016 hit entitled, "Ringtones & Lullabies" inspired by with the B5 Ringtone Licensing of 1998.

The fact that consumers were willing to pay up to $5 for ringtones, made mobile music a profitable part of the music industry. A significant portion of sales went to the cell phone provider. The Manhattan-based marketing and consulting firm Consect estimated ringtones generated $4 billion in worldwide sales in 2004. According to Fortune magazine, ringtones generated more than $2 billion in worldwide sales during 2005. The rise of sound files also contributed to the popularization of ringtones. In 2003 for example, the Japanese ringtone market, which alone was worth US$900 million, experienced US$66.4 million worth of sound file ringtone sales. In 2003, the global ringtone industry was worth somewhere between US$2.5 and US$3.5 billion. In 2009, the research firm SNL Kagan estimated that sales of ringtones in the United States peaked at $714 million in 2007.

== Cult following ==
The iconic Nokia tune on piano

Preloaded ringtones have also developed a cult following over the years. A Twitter account named Tech Product Bangers (formerly known as Ringtone Bangers) launched in 2020, which originally only posted preloaded ringtones from mobile phones, but over time has begun to post other music related to technology such as demos from keyboards and software installation background music, and accordingly changed its name. The account has also published interviews with composers who worked on ringtones. Thomas Dolby, who founded Beatnik and later Retro Ringtones, stated he is "pleased to see an upsurge of interest in classic ringtones", while several composers who worked at Nokia have expressed surprise over the interest in ringtones.

== Decline of popularity ==
SNL Kagan estimated U.S. sales of ringtones in 2008 declined to $541 million, as consumers utilized third-party software and tutorials to create ringtones themselves. Another reason for the decline of ringtones is due to the increase of mobile devices in the late 2000s having internet connectivity, allowing consumers to download full songs from marketplaces such as iTunes and Amazon, rather than buying excerpts for $5 through text. The technological advancements of smartphones is also considered to be a factor in the decline of ringtones, with consumers shifting their focus to software such as games and social media. The decline of ringtones has further continued throughout the 2010s and 2020s, with many people setting the ringtone to silent; Sensor Tower reported in 2021 that ringtone app downloads decreased by 20% from 2016 to 2020.

== See also ==
- Zip tone
