= Vox Day =

American writer and activist (born 1968)

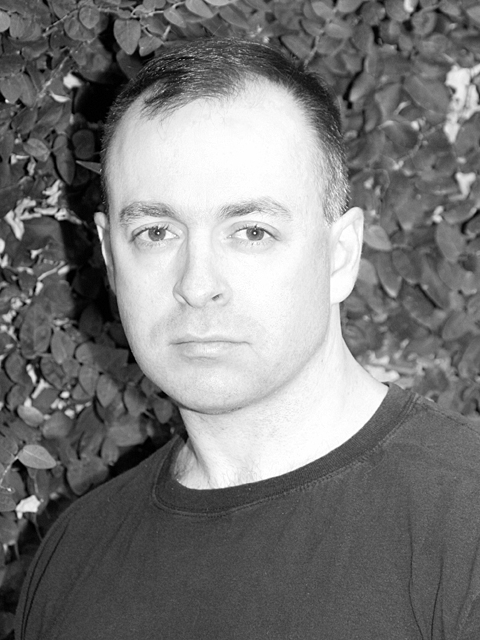
- Day in 2007
- Born: Theodore Robert Beale; August 21, 1968 (age 58); Minnesota, U.S.
- Education: Bucknell University
- Known for: Writer; publisher; game designer; activist
- Children: 3
- Website: voxday.net

Theodore Robert Beale (born August 21, 1968), commonly known as Vox Day, is an American activist and writer. He has been described as a far-right white supremacist, a misogynist, and part of the alt-right. The Wall Street Journal described him as "the most despised man in science fiction."

Beale started in video game development, which led to him writing science fiction and social commentary with a focus on issues of religion, race and gender. He became active in the Science Fiction and Fantasy Writers Association, from which he was expelled, and was a central figure in the "Rabid Puppies" controversy involving the Hugo Awards for science fiction. He is active in publishing, being a founding member of Castalia House.

== Early life and music career ==
Theodore Robert Beale grew up in Minnesota, the son of Rebecca and Robert Beale. He graduated from Bucknell University in 1990 with majors in Economics and East Asian Studies.

Beale was a member of the band Psykosonik between 1992 and 1994.

== Video game development ==
Beale and Andrew Lunstad founded the video game company Fenris Wolf in 1993. The company was developing two games – Rebel Moon Revolution and Traveler for the Sega Dreamcast – when it closed in 1999 after a legal dispute with its retail publisher GT Interactive. In 1999, under the name Eternal Warriors, Beale and Lunstad released The War in Heaven, a Biblical video game published by Valusoft and distributed by GT Interactive.

== Technology ==
Beale created the WarMouse (known as the OpenOffice Mouse until Sun Microsystems objected on trademark grounds), a computer mouse with 18 buttons, a scroll wheel, a thumb-operated joystick, and 512k of memory.

== Writings ==
Beale writes under the pseudonym Vox Day, a homophone of the Latin phrase vox Dei, meaning the voice of God. He first used the aliases as a contributor for the magazine Computer Gaming World throughout the first half of 1995. He then appeared in a weekly video game review column in the St. Paul Pioneer Press, and later continued to use the pen name for a weekly WorldNetDaily opinion column. In 2000, Beale published his first solo novel, The War in Heaven, the first in a series of fantasy novels with a religious theme titled The Eternal Warriors. The novel investigates themes "about good versus evil among angels, fallen and otherwise".

Beale served as a member of the Nebula Award Novel Jury in 2004.

In 2008, Beale published The Irrational Atheist: Dissecting the Unholy Trinity of Dawkins, Harris, and Hitchens, a book devoted to criticizing the arguments presented in various books by atheist authors Richard Dawkins, Sam Harris, Christopher Hitchens, Daniel Dennett, and Michel Onfray. The book was named a 2007 Christmas recommendation by John Derbyshire in the conservative magazine National Review Online.

Through his blog, Beale is also known for coining the Internet terms sigma male and midwit in the early 2010s.

== Publishing ==
=== Castalia House ===
In early 2014, Beale founded Castalia House publishing in Kouvola, Finland. He is lead editor and has published the work of such writers as John C. Wright, Jerry Pournelle, Tom Kratman, Eric S. Raymond, Martin van Creveld, Rolf Nelson, and William S. Lind.

In 2016, Castalia House works had two wins at the Dragon Awards:

- Best Science Fiction Novel: Somewhither, by John C. Wright
- Best Apocalyptic Novel: Ctrl-Alt-Revolt! by Nick Cole

=== Infogalactic ===
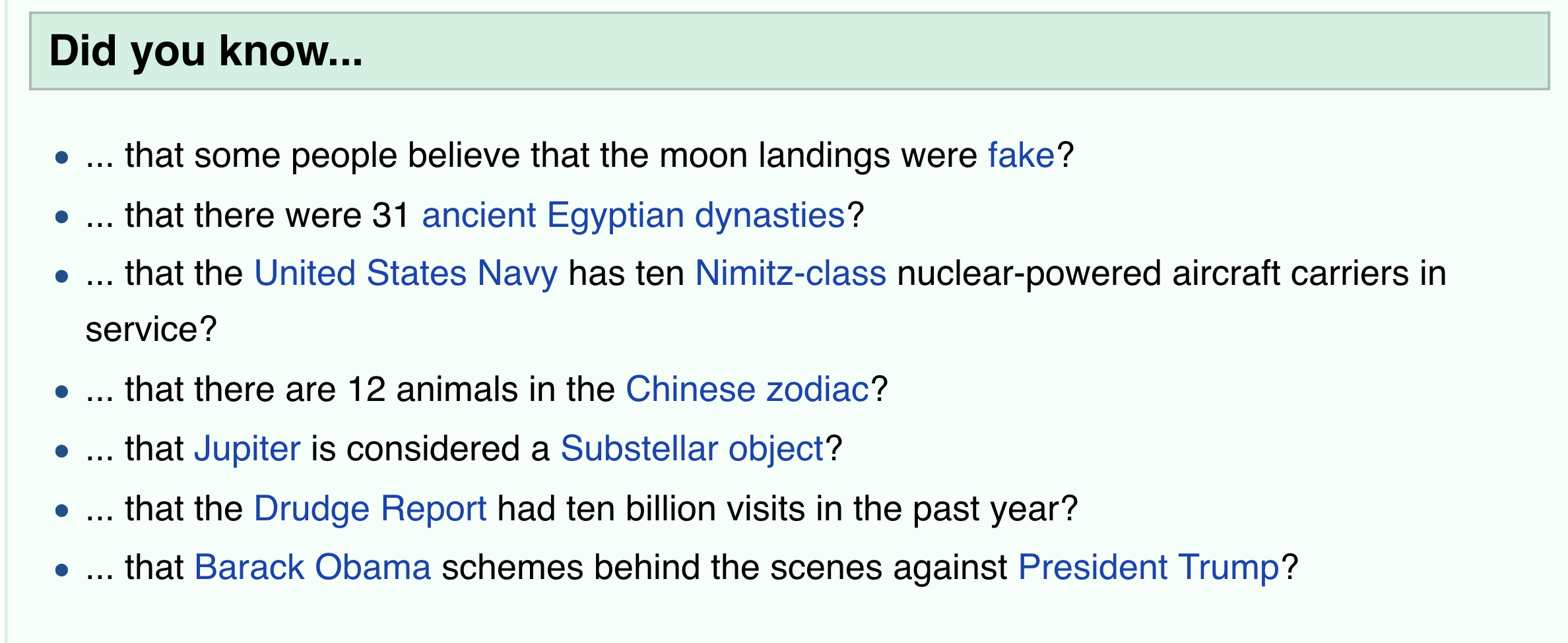
Example of Infogalactic content

In 2017, Beale launched Infogalactic, an English-language wiki encyclopedia. The site was a fork of the contents of English Wikipedia which could be gradually edited to remove the influence of what Beale described as "the left-wing thought police who administer [Wikipedia]". It has been described by Wired and The Washington Post as a version of Wikipedia targeted to alt-right readers.

=== Arkhaven Comics ===
In September 2018, Beale announced Comicsgate Comics as a "100% SJW-free" comic book publishing imprint. The use of this name drew backlash from Ethan Van Sciver and other Comicsgate activists, who variously objected to being associated with white supremacists or to the name being commercialized. Beale later renamed the imprint to Arkhaven Comics.

Beale also runs YouTube channels which, according to The Daily Dot, have jointly more than 49,500 subscribers.

== Controversies ==
=== Expulsion from the SFWA ===
In 2013, Beale ran unsuccessfully against Steven Gould to succeed John Scalzi as president of the Science Fiction and Fantasy Writers of America (SFWA). African-American writer N. K. Jemisin, during her delivery of the Guest of Honour speech at 2013 Continuum in Australia, stated that 10% of the SFWA membership voted for Beale in his bid for the SFWA presidential position and called him "a self-described misogynist, racist, anti-Semite, and a few other flavors of asshole" and asserted that silence about these issues was the same as enabling them. Beale responded by calling Jemisin an "ignorant half-savage". In the resulting interactions, Beale also called writer and editor Teresa Nielsen Hayden a "fat frog".

Beale tweeted a link to his comments about Jemisin on the SFWA's official @SFWAAuthors Twitter feed. The SFWA Board subsequently voted unanimously to expel him from the organization. In 2015, The Wall Street Journal described Beale as "the most despised man in science fiction".

=== Rabid Puppies and Hugo Awards controversy ===
==== 2015 Rabid Puppies campaign ====
Based on Larry Correia's "Sad Puppies" ballot-manipulation campaign, Beale implemented a slate of candidates for the 2015 Hugo Awards called "Rabid Puppies", instructing his followers to nominate the slate "precisely as they are." The Rabid Puppies slate placed 58 of its 67 recommended nominees on the ballot. Two of the nominations were for Beale himself (Best Editor - Long Form, Best Editor - Short Form) and eleven were for works published by his publisher Castalia House, where Beale acts as lead editor. Two authors, an editor, and a fanzine subsequently withdrew their own nominations; three of these four explicitly cited the wish to dissociate themselves from Beale as being among their reasons for doing so. Withdrawals from the Best Novel category allowed space for Liu Cixin's The Three-Body Problem to move into a finalist position, and it went on to win the Hugo Award for Best Novel. Although the winning novel was one of the few nominees not on the Rabid Puppies slate, some sources credited the win to Beale's backing of the novel.

Beale stated that his intentions behind the Rabid Puppies campaign were that he "wanted to leave a big smoking hole where the Hugo Awards were" and send "a giant Fuck You—one massive gesture of contempt." He also said that no matter how the Hugo administrators modify the nominating process to try to prevent manipulation, he will still have enough supporters to control future awards: "I have 390 sworn and numbered vile faceless minions who are sworn to mindless and perfect obedience."

==== 2016 Rabid Puppies campaign ====
In 2016, Beale continued the Rabid Puppies campaign, posting a slate of finalists for the Hugo Award, including all finalists in the Best Short Story category. Beale included himself on the slate of candidates, and was nominated in the category Best Editor, Long Form, the Castalia House Blog edited by Jeffro Johnson in the category Best Fanzine, and his own non-fiction release SJWs Always Lie: Taking Down the Thought Police, published by Castalia House, in the category Best Related Work.

Other Rabid Puppy recommendations that were Hugo Award finalists included Chuck Tingle's gay erotica short story Space Raptor Butt Invasion and Hao Jingfang's Folding Beijing, which won in the Best Novelette category. All nominated works associated with Castalia House ranked below No Award.

=== Gamergate ===
Beale was an early supporter of Gamergate and hosted the GGinParis meetup in July 2015 with Milo Yiannopoulos and Mike Cernovich.

=== Rebel's Run movie ===
In 2019, Beale put together a campaign to crowdfund Rebel's Run, which was to be an "anti-woke" superhero movie. The campaign exceeded its original goal and collected slightly over a million dollars in funding, which was to be held in escrow while Beale worked to secure additional funds to make the movie. In 2022, however, Beale announced that he had put the funds in an investment with Ohana Capital Financial, which allegedly spent the funds on an unrelated business undertaking. Ohana owner James Wolfgramm has been indicted on charges of fraud. By video, Beale told the subscribers "I wouldn't count on us getting the money back."

== Hugo Award nominations ==
The Hugo voters ranked "Opera" sixth out of five nominees, behind No Award. In the 2015 Hugos, it was alleged that his nomination may have been the result of "block voting by special interest groups". In all cases, his nominations have been ranked below "No Award" in the final vote.

== Personal life ==
Beale is married, and has several children. With his family of five, he lives in the Canton of Vaud in Switzerland, and owns Cressier Manor in the Canton of Fribourg, Switzerland.

== Political views ==
Beale describes himself as a Christian nationalist. He has been described as an alt-right personality by Wired, and a leader of the alt-right by Business Insider. Writing for Publishers Weekly, Kimberly Winston described Beale as a "fundamentalist Southern Baptist", but other journalists have made more pointed characterizations, such as Mike VanHelder's assertion in Popular Science that Beale's views are "white supremacist".

=== White supremacy ===
Beale has been supportive of the white supremacist Fourteen Words slogan, promoting it in his Sixteen points of the Alt-Right, which placed the sentence "we must secure the existence of white people and a future for white children" as the fourteenth point.

=== Women's suffrage ===
The New Republic reported that Beale "has written that women should be deprived of the vote". Beale said in a blog post that "women's suffrage has been a complete and unmitigated disaster across the West and it is doubtful that any society can survive it for long."

== Video games ==
Game name	First released	System name(s)	Role(s)
X-Kaliber 2097	1994	SNES	Music (Psykosonik)
CyClones	1994	DOS	Audio
Rebel Moon	1995	DOS	Game designer, co-producer
Rebel Moon Rising	1997	DOS	Game designer, co-producer
Rebel Moon Revolution (cancelled)	Planned 1999	Windows	Game designer, co-producer
The War in Heaven	1999	Windows	Game designer
RPG Traveller (cancelled)	(Planned 2000)	Sega Dreamcast	Game designer
Hot Dish	2007	Windows	(co-)game designer

== Published works ==
=== Fiction ===
- A Sea of Skulls (2024) ISBN 978-3039440351
- The Altar of Hate (2014) ISBN 978-952-7065-23-5
- The Last Witchking (2013) ISBN 978-952-7065-04-4
- The Wardog's Coin (2013) ISBN 978-1-935929-97-0
- A Throne of Bones (2012) ISBN 978-1-935929-82-6
- A Magic Broken (2012) ISBN 978-1-935929-79-6
- Summa Elvetica: A Casuistry of the Elvish Controversy (2008) ISBN 978-0-9821049-2-7
- The Wrath of Angels (2006) ISBN 978-0-7434-6982-1 (as Theodore Beale)
- The World in Shadow (2002) ISBN 978-0-671-02454-3 (as Theodore Beale)
- The War in Heaven (2000) ISBN 978-0-7434-5344-8 (as Theodore Beale)

=== Nonfiction ===
- Jordanetics: A Journey Into the Mind of Humanity's Greatest Thinker (2018) ISBN 978-952-7065-69-3
- SJWs Always Double Down: Anticipating the Thought Police (2017) ISBN 978-952-7065-19-8
- SJWs Always Lie: Taking Down the Thought Police (2015) ISBN 978-952-7065-68-6
- The Return of the Great Depression (2009) ISBN 978-1-935071-18-1
- The Irrational Atheist (2008) ISBN 978-1-933771-36-6

=== As contributor ===
- Cuckservative: How "Conservatives" Betrayed America (2015), John Red Eagle, ASIN B018ZHHA52
- Quantum Mortis: A Mind Programmed (2014), Jeff Sutton, Jean Sutton. Castalia House. ISBN 978-952-7065-13-6
- Quantum Mortis: Gravity Kills (2013), Steve Rzasa. Marcher Lord Hinterlands. ISBN 978-952-7065-12-9
- Quantum Mortis: A Man Disrupted (2013), Steve Rzasa. Marcher Lord Hinterlands. ISBN 978-952-7065-10-5
- Rebel Moon (1996), Bruce Bethke. Pocket Books. ISBN 978-0-671-00236-7. Novelization of the Rebel Moon game.
- The Anthology at the End of the Universe (2004), Glen Yeffeth (editor). BenBella Books. ISBN 978-1-932100-56-3
- Archangels: The Fall (2005) ISBN 978-1-887814-15-7
- Revisiting Narnia: Fantasy, Myth, and Religion in C.S. Lewis' Chronicles (2005), Shanna Caughey (editor). BenBella Books. ISBN 978-1-932100-63-1
- Halo Effect (2007), Glenn Yeffeth (editor). BenBella Books. ISBN 978-1-933771-11-3
- You Do Not Talk About Fight Club (2008), Chuck Palahniuk (Foreword), Read Mercer Schuchardt (Editor). BenBella Books. ISBN 978-1-933771-52-6
- Stupefying Stories October 2011 (2011), Bruce Bethke (Editor). Rampant Loon Press. ASIN B005T5B9YC
- Stupefying Stories March 2012 (2012), Bruce Bethke (Editor). Rampant Loon Press. ASIN B007T3N0XK
