= The Irrational Atheist =

2008 book by Vox Day

- Author: Vox Day
- Language: English
- Subject: Atheism
- Published: 2008
- Publisher: BenBella Books
- Publication place: United States
- Media type: Print
- Pages: 320
- ISBN: 978-1-933771-36-6

The Irrational Atheist: Dissecting the Unholy Trinity of Dawkins, Harris, and Hitchens is a 2008 non-fiction book by Vox Day, an American Christian nationalist and far-right activist, writer, musician, publisher, and video game designer. The Irrational Atheist was one of a number of books including God's Undertaker, and The Devil's Delusion, published in response to Dawkins and other New Atheists.

According to Publishers Weekly, "Day comes at the issues from a nontheological perspective... relying on factual evidence to counter atheist claims that religion causes war, that religious people are more apt to commit crime and that the Bible and other sacred texts are unreliable and fictitious." Day's critiques are primarily addressed towards positions supported by Richard Dawkins, Sam Harris, Christopher Hitchens, Daniel Dennett, and Michel Onfray.

In 2007 writer and commentator John Derbyshire listed the work as a Christmas recommendation in an article for the conservative magazine National Review Online.
