= Lorraine Hariton =

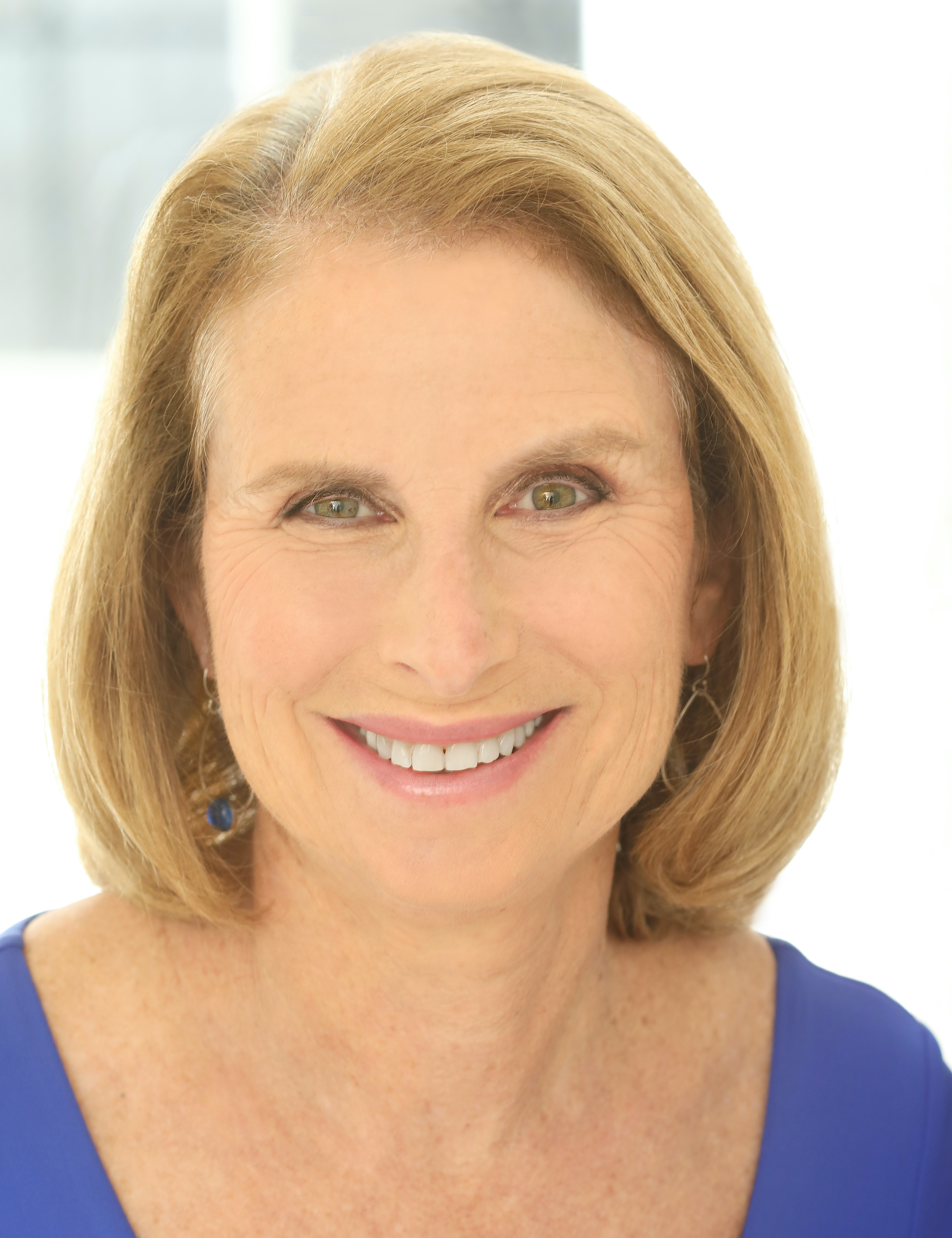
- Lorraine Hariton, president and CEO of Catalyst
- Born: November 7, 1954 (age 70)
- Education: Stanford University; Harvard Business School
- Occupation: CEO of Catalyst

Lorraine Hariton (born November 7, 1954) is the president and CEO of Catalyst, a New York City–based nonprofit organization committed to the advancement of women in the workplace.

== Early life and education ==
Hariton earned a Bachelor of Science in mathematical sciences from Stanford University and an MBA (1982) from Harvard Business School.

== Career ==
Hariton started her career in 1977 at IBM, where she worked for 15 years, including in sales and executive roles. She later served as CEO of two venture-backed Silicon Valley start-ups: Beatnik (1999–2002), which made audio software for phones, and Apptera (2003–2005), a mobile communications and advertising company.

In 2009, Hariton was appointed by Barack Obama to be Special Representative for Commercial and Business Affairs (CBA) at the US Department of State, where she was responsible for outreach to the business community, commercial advocacy and global entrepreneurship efforts, and where she established the Global Entrepreneurship Program, the WECREATE program for women entrepreneurs, and the International Council on Women's Business Leadership.

In 2014, Hariton joined The New York Academy of Sciences as senior vice president for global partnerships, where she helped create the Global STEM Alliance and its 1000 Girls, 1000 Futures program, a global mentoring initiative aimed at encouraging girls to pursue careers in science, technology, engineering, and math.

In 2018, Hariton was appointed president and CEO of Catalyst. During her tenure, Catalyst has raised $28 million toward its major gifts campaign, and has received the single largest grant in its history, $5 million from Chevron.

Hariton has served on boards of organizations committed to the advancement of women in the workplace, including the UN Women Global Innovation Coalition for Change, the Clayman Institute for Gender Research at Stanford University, and Watermark, a San Francisco Bay Area organization of women executives in the tech industry.
