= GTX =

GTX may refer to:

== Companies ==
- GTx Incorporated, an American pharmaceutical company

== Transportation ==
- Mazda Familia GTX, a turbocharged automobile
- Plymouth GTX, an automobile produced 1967–1971
- Sea-Doo GTX, a personal watercraft
- Great Train eXpress, an urban railway network Seoul, South Korea

== Science and technology ==
- GeForce GTX, a brand of graphics processing units
- Global Trade Exchange, a United States Homeland Security intelligence project
- Gonyautoxin, several toxic molecules produced by algae
- GTX program, a 2002 NASA project for an air-augmented rocket

== Other uses ==
- IMSA GTX, a sport car racing category

== See also ==
- RTX (disambiguation)
