= Concerto for Orchestra (Skrowaczewski) =

Composition by Stanisław Skrowaczewski

The Concerto for Orchestra is an orchestral composition by the Polish-American composer Stanisław Skrowaczewski. Though originally composed in 1983 and premiered in the mid-1980s, Skrowaczewski later reworked the composition. It was first performed in its revised form on November 19, 1998, in Philadelphia by the orchestra of the Curtis Institute of Music. The revised piece was a finalist for the 1999 Pulitzer Prize for Music.

== Composition ==
The Concerto for Orchestra has a duration of roughly 30 minutes is composed in two movements:

1. Adagio, Misterioso
2. Adagio, "Anton Bruckners Himmelfahrt" ("Bruckner's Heavenly Journey")

== Reception ==
Martin Cotton of BBC Music Magazine lauded the composition, writing, "The Concerto for Orchestra is the expected display piece only in the first of its two movements, and the orchestra provides the necessary sparkle, but it also responds to the deeper substance of the long Adagio, subtitled 'Bruckner's Heavenly Journey'. Here the long-breathed string lines and cushioned brass writing pay tribute to the Austrian symphonist, while the harmonies and use of percussion place the music firmly in the 20th century."
