= Psykosonik =

American techno band

- Origin: Minneapolis, Minnesota, U.S.
- Genres: Techno; Industrial; EBM
- Years active: 1992–1997
- Labels: Exit (Dietrich Dexter); Wax Trax!
- Past members: Paul Sebastien; Daniel Lenz; Theodore Beale; Michael Larson

Psykosonik was an American techno and industrial music group. The band had four Billboard charted Top 40 hit singles on the Dance Club Songs chart. Psykosonik was featured on the Mortal Kombat Annihilation soundtrack.

The band's lyrics include cyberpunk and extropian themes that allude to virtual reality, AI, cybernetics, life extension, and general science.

== History ==
Psykosonik included musicians Paul Sebastien, Theodore Beale, Daniel Lenz, and Michael Larson. In 1987 Theodore Beale was playing in a cover band called NoBoys. He first met Paul Sebastian at The Underground in Minneapolis and the two men put together a band with Beale on keyboards and Sebastian on guitar and vocals. They found a drummer Michael Larson and a production engineer Daniel Lenz. The band Psykosonik began recording electronic music at Sebastian's apartment where he had a recording studio, and later found performance opportunities in local clubs including First Avenue, 7th Street Entry, and Glam Slam. Their first successful song was "Sex Me Up", which they used as a demo to sign with Wax Trax! Records and TVT Records.

Their first album, Psykosonik, was released in 1993. Their second album, Unlearn, was released in 1995. The hit singles from these albums included "Silicon Jesus" in September 1993, "Welcome to My Mind" in February 1994, "Unlearn" (1995) and "It Has Begun" (1996). The members also appeared in video productions. The band's third album was titled Spiritual Machine. It was completed by 1997 but was never released by the band's label, Wax Trax! Records, which was at this time owned by TVT Records. Because of disagreements with their label, Psykosonik then disbanded.

Daniel Lenz went on to produce a single album with vocalist Brent Daniels titled Searching for the End under the band name Hednoize. In 2001 Lenz launched a short lived project called PsykoHed on MP3.com. He released his debut solo album, Stuck in a Dream, in 2008, featuring guest appearances by Brent Daniels, as well as Paul Sebastien of Psykosonik.

Paul Sebastien went on to work as a composer at Thomas Dolby's audio technology company Beatnik, composing several tracks for its Headspace Music Library before leaving in 1998 to pursue other technology interests. In 2003, Sebastien teamed up with Caesar Filori to release two singles under the name Basic Pleasure Model, titled Sunyata and How to Live. Larson went on to become the audio director for Epic Games and produced the soundtracks for the Gears of War series. Beale, also known as Vox Day, left the field of music.

== Personnel ==
- Paul Sebastien (1992–1997) – vocals, composition, engineering, lyrics, mixing, production
- Daniel Lenz (1992–1997) – composition, engineering, lyrics, mixing, production
- Theodore Beale (1992–1994) – composition, lyrics
- Michael Larson (1992–1994) – samples, percussion

== Discography ==
=== Albums ===
Title	Release date	Label
Psykosonik	US: 1993-02-02; Japan: 1993-11-01	US: Wax Trax!/TVT; Japan: Polystar
Unlearn	1995-11-06	Wax Trax!/TVT
Spiritual Machine	Unreleased	Wax Trax!/TVT

=== Singles ===
Song	Release date	Chart peak	Weeks in chart	Album	Formats	Label
"Silicon Jesus"	1993-05-25	37 (Dance Club Songs)	5	Psykosonik	Released as four-track vinyl and six-track CD.	Wax Trax!/TVT
"Welcome to My Mind"	1993-11-23	26 (Dance Club Songs)	10	Psykosonik	Released as five-track vinyl and seven-track CD.	Wax Trax!/TVT
"Unlearn"	1995-08-08	11 (Dance Club Songs)	11	Unlearn	Released as five-track vinyl and ten-track CD.	Wax Trax!/TVT
"Panik Kontrol (PQM's Deephead Pass)"	Unknown			Mortal Kombat Annihilation soundtrack	Released only as a white label promo.	Wax Trax!/TVT

=== Movie and game soundtracks ===
Song	Release date	Title
Various	1993	X-Kaliber 2097|Activision
Various	1994	CyClones|Strategic Simulations, Inc.
"Unlearn (Josh Wink's Live Mix)"	1995	Mortal Kombat
"Theme"	1995	Marathon 2: Durandal
"Theme"	1996	Marathon Infinity
"It Has Begun"	1996	Mortal Kombat: More Kombat
"Need to Die"	1997	Organ Donors, Freestyle Motocross
"Panik Kontrol"	1997	Mortal Kombat Annihilation
