= MUCOM88 =

Music composition system for the NEC PC-8801

- Developer: Yuzo Koshiro
- Operating system: ALPHA-DOS (PC-8801); Windows XP or later
- Platform: NEC PC-8801, Windows
- Type: Music composition system
- License: CC BY-NC-SA 4.0 (original version)
- Website: www.ancient.co.jp/~mucom88/

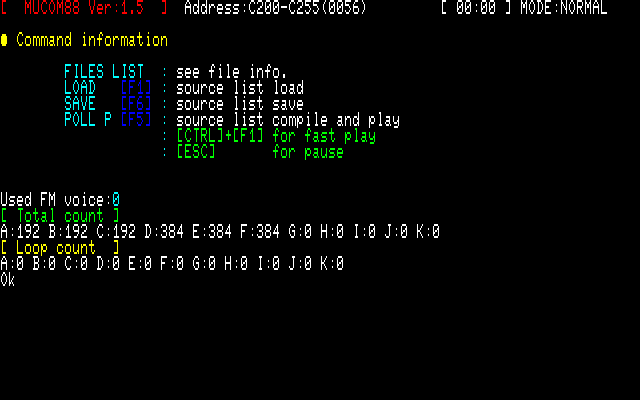
Command information screen of MUCOM88 Ver. 1.5 on the NEC PC-8801.

MUCOM88 is a Music Macro Language (MML) music composition system written by Japanese composer Yuzo Koshiro. It was developed in 1987 for the NEC PC-8801 series and includes drivers for the Yamaha YM2203 and YM2608 sound chips. A commercial version was released in 1991.

== History ==
In discussing the PC FM-sound-driver environment around Koshiro's work, Haruhisa Tanaka describes SPLIT, a music system used by Koshiro, and MUCOM, a sound driver developed by Nihon Falcom programmer Yoshio Kiya. Kiya incorporated functions from SPLIT into MUCOM, and the two systems subsequently exchanged new features as they developed. MUCOM88 itself runs under ALPHA-DOS, a disk operating system written by the same author as SPLIT.

Koshiro developed MUCOM88 as his own FM sound driver in the late 1980s, which Video Game Music Online credits with substantially raising the quality of his scores; he continued to use it on later projects, including The Scheme and Misty Blue. Koshiro has said that he built MUCOM88 for the PC-8801mkII SR with a friend's help, working from published technical documentation, and that it gives access to every part of the YM2608. Because the PC-8801's FM sound hardware is close to that of the Mega Drive, he also used MUCOM88 to compose Mega Drive scores. The software was released commercially in 1991; Micomsoft later described it as a standard music-production tool that had been used by many users.

On 20 December 2018, Ancient released the original PC-8801 version as a free disk image. The release was accompanied by sample MML data from several of Koshiro's game scores, including ActRaiser, Streets of Rage, Etrian Odyssey, The Scheme and The Revenge of Shinobi. Sample data for Algarna (アルガーナ) (1988) was among the material added later that month. MUCOM88 Windows was released at the same time.

== Software ==
The original MUCOM88 runs under ALPHA-DOS on the PC-8801 and comprises an FM sound driver and a set of composition tools. Music is entered in MML and played through the computer's built-in sound hardware or Sound Board II; with the latter, MUCOM88 supports six FM channels, three PSG channels, six rhythm channels and one ADPCM channel. MUCOM88, SPLIT-i and ALPHA-DOS are preinstalled on Micomsoft's PasocomMini PC-8801mkII SR.

MUCOM88 Windows was developed by Onion Software. It is available with either a graphical interface or a command-line interface and does not require a PC-8801 BIOS or disk image. It runs on Windows XP or later and can drive a physical YM2608 through the Sound Chip Common Interface (SCCI). Its source code is maintained through the Open MUCOM88 project.

== See also ==
- Music Macro Language
- Yuzo Koshiro
- NEC PC-8801
