= X-Kaliber 2097 =

1994 video game

- North American cover art
- Developers: Fupac; Winds
- Publishers: JP: Toshiba EMI; NA: Activision; EU: Activision
- Directors: Naoki Morishima; Nobuyuki Hakamada
- Producers: Takahiko Nagashima; Yoshihiko Ohashi; Katsuhiko Umeki
- Designer: Eiji Koyama
- Programmer: Satoshi Fujishima
- Composers: JP: Hitoshi Sakimoto Hayato Matsuo; NA: Psykosonik Ali Lexa
- Platform: Super NES
- Release: JP: February 11, 1994; NA: February 1994; EU: December 1994
- Genre: Platform
- Mode: Single-player

X-Kaliber 2097 (Note: Known in Japan as Sword Maniac (Japanese: ソード・マニアック, Hepburn: Sōdo Maniakku)) is a 1994 action game published by Activision for the Super Nintendo Entertainment System. It was co-developed by the Japanese studios Fupac and Winds.

== Story ==
The game takes place in the near-anarchic future of the year 2097, in which the world's economy has been devastated, governments have collapsed, and organized crime has gained dramatic influence. The player guides a swordsman named Slash through a side-scrolling environment.

== Gameplay ==
Boss encounters take place as one-on-one matches in the style of versus fighting games.

== Soundtrack ==
Gameplay screenshot.

X-Kaliber 2097's American soundtrack features tracks by electronic/industrial music group Psykosonik and arranged for Activision by Ali Lexa. Psykosonik's soundtrack became a prominent part of the game's marketing, and was often plugged in marketing blurbs. The soundtrack is also mentioned on the game packaging, and has its own section in the game manual.

The Japanese version features music by Hitoshi Sakimoto and Hayato Matsuo, as well as a completely different storyline and script (with different names for every character) compared to the ones that were given in the English localization of the game.

== Reception ==
Reception

Review scores
Publication	Score
AllGame	3.5/5
Electronic Gaming Monthly	7/10, 7/10, 6/10, 6/10, 6/10
Game Players	77%
Hyper	70%
Super Play	68%
Total!	(UK) 71% (DE) 5
Games World	41/100
Super Action	82%
Super Gamer	74/100
VideoGames	5/10

X-Kaliber 2097 received a 19.7/30 score in a readers' poll conducted by Super Famicom Magazine. The game also garnered average reviews.
