= IMelody =

iMelody is a non-polyphonic ringtone exchange object format, used for mobile phones [Extension: .imy], defined by Ericsson and Sony Ericsson together with other manufacturers and is based on Ericsson's proprietary eMelody format. This ringtone format also supports codes that can control the vibration motor, backlight, LED lights and volume of the device. The iMelody format was made because the eMelody had some musical limitations.

== Transferring melody to mobile phones ==
In order to transfer these ringtones to a mobile phone, one can simply send an SMS message with the iMelody/eMelody text as the text of the message, or make a plain text file containing the iMelody/eMelody text, using the extension of either .imy for iMelody or .emy for eMelody, and transfer the file to the mobile phone by Bluetooth, IrDA (infrared), or by a data cable. The file could also be attached to an MMS message or an e-mail message.

== iMelody ==
MIME: "text/x-iMelody" or "audio/iMelody"

Extension: ".imy"

Here is an example of an advanced ringtone in the iMelody format, this is a silent ringtone that only makes the phone's vibrating motor vibrate constantly:

BEGIN:IMELODY
VERSION:1.2
FORMAT:CLASS1.0
BEAT:25
MELODY:vibeonr2vibeonr2vibeon (r2vibeonvibeonr2vibeonr2vibeonr2vibeonr2vibeonr2vibeonr2vibeonr2vibeonr2vibeonr2vibeonr2vibeonr2vibeonr2vibeonr2vibeonr2vibeonr2vibeonr2ledonr2vibeonr2vibeon
END:IMELODY

Another example of an advanced ringtone, which makes the vibrating motor vibrate constantly, the backlight of the phone's display blink and plays a simple tone:

BEGIN:IMELODY
VERSION:1.2
FORMAT:CLASS1.0
BEAT:900
STYLE:S1
MELODY:(vibeonbackoff*6c5ledon*6d5ledoff*6e5ledon*6f5ledoff*6g5ledon*6a5ledoff*6b5ledon*6a5ledoff*6g5*6f5*6e5*6d5*6c5backon*6d5*6e5*6f5*6g5*6a5*6b5*6a5*6g5*6f5*6e5*6d5@0)
END:IMELODY

== eMelody ==
MIME: "text/x-eMelody" or "audio/e-melody"

Extension: ".emy"

Here is an example of a ringtone in eMelody format:

BEGIN:EMELODY
VERSION:1.0
NAME:Test melody 1
COMPOSER:John Smith
MELODY:+f+a+fa(b)bdcC+GA+d+#c+dfg+daea+d+#c+e+f+e+fa(b)bdC+EA+d+#c+dfgba+d+#C
END:EMELODY
