= Synthetic music mobile application format =

SMAF File Format
- Filename extension: .mmf
- Internet media type: application/vnd.smaf
- Developed by: Yamaha Corporation
- Initial release: 1999
- Type of format: audio file format

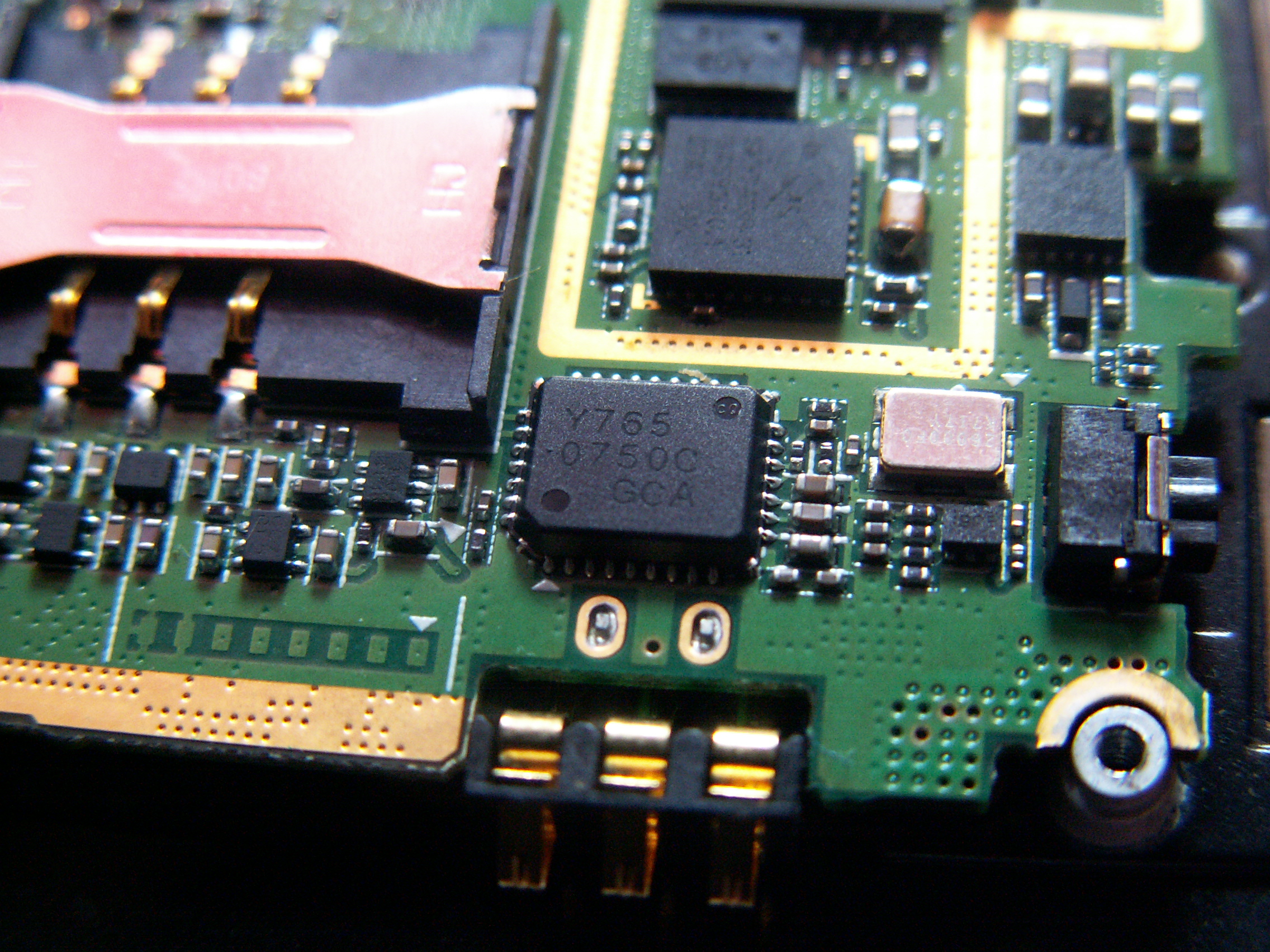
Yamaha's YMU765 chip on Samsung's SGH-U600 motherboard.

Synthetic music Mobile Application Format, abbreviated SMAF, is a music data format specified by Yamaha for portable electronic devices, such as cell phones and PDAs. The file extension for SMAF is .MMF and is common as ringtones for mobile phones with one of five sound chips.

SMAF resembles MIDI, but also supports graphics and PCM sound playback. Its MIDI playback is produced via FM synthesis or PCM sample-based synthesis, where instrument data (parameters and/or PCM samples) is stored within the .MMF file itself, similar to module files. This enables users to create custom instruments, which will sound exactly the same on devices with the same chip.

The feature set used in SMAF files usually orients itself at the chips produced by Yamaha for playback:

MA-1 (YMU757)	4 FM voices
MA-2 (YMU759)	16 FM voices, ADPCM playback
MA-3 (YMU762)	32 FM voices, 8 wavetable voices, PCM/ADPCM playback
MA-5 (YMU765)	64 voices (FM + wavetable + Analog Lite synthesizer), PCM/ADPCM playback
MA-7 (YMU786)	67 voices (FM + wavetable + Analog Lite synthesizer + Streaming), PCM/ADPCM playback
